= List of FK Sarajevo managers =

Fudbalski klub Sarajevo (Cyrillic: Фудбалски клуб Сарајево, IPA: [fûdbalskiː klûːb sɑɹəˈjeɪvəʊ]; English: Sarajevo Football Club) is a professional football club based in Sarajevo, the capital city of Bosnia and Herzegovina and is one of the most successful clubs in the country. This chronological list comprises all those who have held the position of club manager since the club's formation in 1946.

In Sarajevo's history, 50 managers have so far managed the club, with some doing so on more than one occasion. The club's first manager was Josip Bulat, who led the team from 1 November 1946 to May 1947. The longest serving manager was Fuad Muzurović, who managed the club from December 1990 to November 1995. Husref Musemić is the only manager in Sarajevo history to have won two or more national championships with the club. He is also the most successful manager in the club's history.

== Managers ==
The following is a list of Sarajevo managers and their respective tenures on the bench:

- (Socialist Federal Republic of Yugoslavia) Josip Bulat (1 November 1946 – May 1947)
- (Socialist Federal Republic of Yugoslavia) Slavko Zagorac (1947–1948)
- (Socialist Federal Republic of Yugoslavia) Miroslav Brozović (September 1948 – August 1952)
- (Socialist Federal Republic of Yugoslavia) Slavko Zagorac (1952–1953)
- (Socialist Federal Republic of Yugoslavia) Aleksandar Tomašević (1953)
- (Socialist Federal Republic of Yugoslavia) Slavko Zagorac (1953)
- (Socialist Federal Republic of Yugoslavia) Miroslav Brozović (1954–1956)
- (Socialist Federal Republic of Yugoslavia) Slavko Zagorac (1956)
- (Socialist Federal Republic of Yugoslavia) Aleksandar Tomašević (1956–1958)
- (Hungary) László Fenyvesi (1958)
- (Socialist Federal Republic of Yugoslavia) Vojin Božović (1958–1959)
- (Socialist Federal Republic of Yugoslavia) Miroslav Brozović (1959–1961)
- (Socialist Federal Republic of Yugoslavia) Ratomir Čabrić (1961–1963)
- (Socialist Federal Republic of Yugoslavia) Abdulah Gegić (1963–1965)
- (Socialist Federal Republic of Yugoslavia) Aleksandar Atanacković (1965–1966)
- (Socialist Federal Republic of Yugoslavia) Miroslav Brozović (1966–1967)
- (Socialist Federal Republic of Yugoslavia) Franjo Lovrić (1967)
- (Socialist Federal Republic of Yugoslavia) Munib Saračević (1967–1969)
- (Socialist Federal Republic of Yugoslavia) Miroslav Brozović (1969–1970)
- (Socialist Federal Republic of Yugoslavia) Srboljub Markušević (1970–1971)
- (Socialist Federal Republic of Yugoslavia) Abdulah Gegić (1971–1972)
- (Socialist Federal Republic of Yugoslavia) Srboljub Markušević (1972–1973)
- (Socialist Federal Republic of Yugoslavia) Svetozar Vujović (1973–1974)
- (Socialist Federal Republic of Yugoslavia) Mirsad Fazlagić (1974–1975)
- (Socialist Federal Republic of Yugoslavia) Vukašin Višnjevac (1975–1977)
- (Socialist Federal Republic of Yugoslavia) Fuad Muzurović (1 July 1977 – 1 September 1981)
- (Socialist Federal Republic of Yugoslavia) Srboljub Markušević (1981–1983)
- (Socialist Federal Republic of Yugoslavia) Boško Antić (1983–1986)
- (Socialist Federal Republic of Yugoslavia) Denijal Pirić (1986–1988)
- (Socialist Federal Republic of Yugoslavia) Džemaludin Mušović (1988–1990)
- (Socialist Federal Republic of Yugoslavia) Rajko Rašević (1990)
- (Socialist Federal Republic of Yugoslavia) Srboljub Markušević (1990)
- (Socialist Federal Republic of Yugoslavia) (Bosnia and Herzegovina) Fuad Muzurović (December 1990 – November 1995)
- (Bosnia and Herzegovina) Denijal Pirić (November 1995 – October 1996)
- (Bosnia and Herzegovina) Nermin Hadžiahmetović (October 1996 – June 1997)
- (Bosnia and Herzegovina) Mehmed Janjoš (June 1997 – July 1998)
- (Bosnia and Herzegovina) Nermin Hadžiahmetović (1998–1999)
- (Bosnia and Herzegovina) Sead Jesenković (1999)
- (Bosnia and Herzegovina) Agim Nikolić (1999)
- (Bosnia and Herzegovina) Denijal Pirić (2000–2001)
- (Bosnia and Herzegovina) Husref Musemić (May 2001 – June 2001)
- (Bosnia and Herzegovina) Fuad Muzurović (July 2001 – June 2002)
- (Bosnia and Herzegovina) Husref Musemić (2002–2003)
- (Bosnia and Herzegovina) Agim Nikolić (2003–2004)
- (Bosnia and Herzegovina) Kemal Alispahić (July 2004 – September 2004)
- (Bosnia and Herzegovina) Edin Prljača (September 2004 – December 2004)
- (Bosnia and Herzegovina) Husref Musemić (January 2005 – June 2008)
- (Bosnia and Herzegovina) Šener Bajramović (June 2008 – October 2008)
- (Bosnia and Herzegovina) Husnija Arapović (October 2008 – December 2008)
- (Bosnia and Herzegovina) Mehmed Janjoš (December 2008 – February 2010)
- (Bosnia and Herzegovina) Mirza Varešanović (April 2010 – June 2011)
- (Czech Republic) Jiří Plíšek (July 2011 – December 2011)
- (Bosnia and Herzegovina) Dragan Jović (January 2012 – March 2013)
- (Bosnia and Herzegovina) Husref Musemić (March 2013 – December 2013)
- (Bosnia and Herzegovina) Abdulah Oruč (interim) (May, November 2013)
- (Croatia) Robert Jarni (December 2013 – April 2014)
- (Bosnia and Herzegovina) Dženan Uščuplić (April 2014 – 26 September 2014)
- (Bosnia and Herzegovina) Meho Kodro (26 September 2014 – 21 April 2015)
- (Bosnia and Herzegovina) Dženan Uščuplić (21 April 2015 – 11 September 2015)
- (Bosnia and Herzegovina) Almir Hurtić (interim) (11 September 2015 – 23 September 2015)
- (Serbia) Miodrag Ješić (23 September 2015 – 16 March 2016)
- (Bosnia and Herzegovina) Almir Hurtić (16 March 2016 – 23 August 2016)
- (Bosnia and Herzegovina) Mehmed Janjoš (29 August 2016 – 23 July 2017)
- (Bosnia and Herzegovina) Senad Repuh (23 July 2017 – 22 August 2017)
- (Bosnia and Herzegovina) Husref Musemić (26 August 2017 – 2 December 2019)
- (Bosnia and Herzegovina) Vinko Marinović (30 December 2019 – 12 May 2021)
- (Bosnia and Herzegovina) Dženan Uščuplić (interim) (13 May 2021 – 31 May 2021)
- (Croatia) Goran Sablić (12 June 2021 – 27 December 2021)
- (North Macedonia) Aleksandar Vasoski (10 January 2022 – 10 May 2022)
- (Bosnia and Herzegovina) Dženan Uščuplić (interim) (12 May 2022 – 1 June 2022)
- (Bosnia and Herzegovina) Feđa Dudić (2 June 2022 – 19 October 2022)
- (Bosnia and Herzegovina) Emir Obuća (interim) (20 October 2022 – 12 December 2022)
- (Bosnia and Herzegovina) Mirza Varešanović (12 December 2022 – 22 July 2023)
- (Slovenia) Simon Rožman (3 August 2023 – 12 June 2024)
- (Croatia) Zoran Zekić (12 June 2024 – 5 August 2025)
- (Bosnia and Herzegovina) Husref Musemić (10 August 2025 – 29 September 2025)
- (Croatia) Mario Cvitanović (30 September 2025 – 4 June 2026)
- (Croatia) Zoran Zekić (9 June 2026 – present)
