= Maroon Friends 1946 =

Udruženje Bordo prijatelji 1946
- Abbreviation: UBP1946
- Founded: 2010
- Type: Fan group, Advocacy group
- Team: FK Sarajevo
- Headquarters: Sarajevo, Bosnia and Herzegovina
- Website: Official website

Maroon Friends 1946 (Bosnian: 'Bordo prijatelji 1946') is an FK Sarajevo fan association and advocacy group organized by influential individuals from the financial, political, and cultural sectors of Bosnian society with the aim of lobbying both locally and internationally for the club and influencing club policies. The association has strong informal ties to FK Sarajevo Ultras, Horde Zla.

== History ==
In 2009, a handful of eminent supporters of FK Sarajevo, including fashion designer Adnan Hajrulahović, poet and musician Benjamin Isović, entrepreneur Avdo Salihbegović and others started having informal meetings about the possibility of organizing a new supporter's association with the goal of helping the club. These meetings led to the formal registration of an Association of Citizens in 2010, which quickly struck a strong partnership with the club's Ultras group, Horde zla. After a thorough analysis of club finances and the announced shift in UEFA licensing, the association came to the conclusion that the club would be in a dire situation by 2012. After the founding Assembly, a platform and organizational plan were forged under the working title Projekt 2010-2014. The association wrote a new template for the club's statute and found bureaucratic loopholes in Bosnia's law in order to potentially attract foreign investment seeing the country has no Sports Law. FK Sarajevo's management at the time, witnessing the association's polyvalence, quickly invited members to join the club's assembly and board, which they did. On 14 July 2012, the new club statute was voted into power, enabling Malaysian businessman, investor and Chairman of Berjaya Group, Vincent Tan, who had earlier been lobbied by Scotiabank director and association member Feđa Kusturica, to buy majority stocks and become de facto owner of the club.

== Media ==
Maroon Friends 1946 has been publishing a monthly magazine named Maroon Fan (Bosnian: Bordo Fan) since 2010. Furthermore, it has, in cooperation with Moja TV, an IPTV provider and subsidiary of the BH Telecom, founded an internet-based television channel named Bordo TV.

== Bodies ==
=== Presidency ===
As of 29 July 2016

Name	Position
Benjamin Isović	Chairman
Senad Kapetanović	Vice-chairman
Avdo Salihbegović	General Secretary
Adis Mešić	Member
Eldin Karić	Member
Senad Kadić	Member
Kenan Agić	Member
Dino Mahić	Member
Armin Skalonja	Member

=== Assembly ===
As of 29 July 2016

Name	Years
Samir Hadžić	Chairman
Zlata Alić Ibišević	Vice-chairman
Mirza Muzurović	Member
Adnan Hajrulahović	Member
Safet Sušić	Member
Irhad Kovačević Geri	Member
Hajrudin Kapetanović	Member
Maid Delić	Member
Dino Mahić	Member
Emir Cokoja	Member
Emil Hadžović	Member

Name	Years
Zijad Blekić	Member
Sead Bašić	Member
Rešad Muratović	Member
Feđa Kusturica	Member
Slaviša Vukićević	Member
Edis Kusturica	Member
Elmedin Konaković	Member
Amir Rizvanović	Member
Reuf Karabeg	Member
Dževad Bećirević	Member
Alen Hujić	Member

== Gallery ==
Bordo TV (Maroon TV) Cover art.

The December 2013 edition of Bordo Fan (Maroon Fan).
