= Zagorac =

Zagorac may refer to:

- native name of a person from Zagorje
- Zagorac (surname)
- Zagorac, Višegrad, a village in Bosnia and Hercegovina
- pseudonym of Ivan Milčetić
