= Alajbegović =

Alajbegović is a Bosnian surname. Notable people with the surname include:

- Mehmed Alajbegović (born 1906), Bosnian Muslim politician
- Ismet Alajbegović Šerbo (born 1925), Bosnian accordionist
- Safet Alajbegović (born 1928), Bosnian footballer
- Kerim Alajbegović (born 2007), Bosnian footballer
