= Fenyvesi =

Fenyvesi is a Hungarian surname. Notable people with the surname include:

- Csaba Fenyvesi (1943–2015), Hungarian fencer
- László Fenyvesi (1908–1993), Hungarian football player and manager
- Máté Fenyvesi (1933–2022), Hungarian football player
