= Škripari =

- Founded: 9 September 1996
- Type: Supporters' group, Ultras group
- Club: NK Široki Brijeg
- Location: Široki Brijeg, Bosnia and Herzegovina
- Arenas: Pecara Stadium
- Colours

Škripari is the organized Ultras group that support Croatian football club NK Široki Brijeg. They also support Široki Brijeg's other sport clubs, primarily HKK Široki in basketball.

== History ==
The fan club as it exists today was named on 9 September 1996. At that time (from the season 1993–1994 onwards, reaching a peak in 1998), Škripari were the only real supporters in Herzegovina, aside from a small fraction of supporters in Ljubuški, as well as Torcida Kiseljak and Torcida Mostar who were only really active in home matches of the teams that they supported.

Although from Bosnia and Herzegovina, Škripari support the Croatia national football team primarily, as well as other Croatian national teams. Croatian nationalism is still present among the fans of the club, being the incidents such as occurred on December 1, 2019, in a 19th-round game of Bosnian Premier League against Bosnian Serb team, FK Zvijezda 09, which was taken as an opportunity by Škripari to glorify Slobodan Praljak, Croatian general accused for war crimes by the Hague Tribunal, as a clear provocation toward the opposing team.

== Controversy and violence ==
Škripari is one of the supporters' groups responsible for the brunt of the football-related violence in Bosnia and Herzegovina. It has also been included amongst the groups considered to be "essentially paramilitary branches of certain political parties," and has been described as one of the most prominent among such groups.

In 2009, a riot between Škripari and Horde Zla, an FK Sarajevo supporters group, in Široki Brijeg led to the death of Horde Zla member Vedran Puljić.

In 2010, Škripari were involved in an incident involving a display of a flag with a swastika on it. This was widely criticized by the football governing bodies.
