= Ivica Glavočević =

Yugoslav footballer

Personal information
- Date of birth: 9 October 1918
- Place of birth: Lukavac, State of Slovenes, Croats and Serbs
- Date of death: 9 July 1981 (aged 62)
- Place of death: Sarajevo, SFR Yugoslavia
- Position: Defender

Senior career*
| Years | Team | Apps | (Gls) |
| 1934–1939 | Slavija Sarajevo | 92 | (1) |
| 1939–1943 | SAŠK | 55 | (0) |
| 1945–1946 | Sloboda | 11 | (0) |
| 1946–1955 | Sarajevo | 145 | (4) |
- * Club domestic league appearances and goals

Ivica Glavočević (9 October 1918 - 9 July 1981) was a Yugoslav professional footballer who played as a defender.

== Career ==
He began his career at age 17 with Slavija Sarajevo, where he played for five seasons before transferring to city rivals SAŠK. Following World War II, he joined the newly formed club Sloboda, which later merged with Udarnik to establish FK Sarajevo. Glavočević became the first captain in Sarajevo's history. He wore the maroon-white jersey for nearly a decade, before retiring from professional football in 1955 and becoming a notable sports administrator.
