= Safet Džinović =

1st President of the Assembly of FK Sarajevo
- In office 1946–1947
- Preceded by: Office established
- Succeeded by: Branko Todić

Personal details
- Born: 11 March 1921 Sarajevo, Kingdom of Serbs, Croats and Slovenes
- Died: 18 December 1997 (aged 76) Sarajevo, Bosnia and Herzegovina
- Profession: economist, sports administrator

Safet Džinović (11 March 1921 – 18 December 1997) was a Yugoslav Partisan, economist and the first president of the assembly of Bosnian football club FK Sarajevo.
