= Želimir Vidović =

Yugoslav footballer (1953–1992)

Želimir "Keli" Vidović

Personal information
- Date of birth: 17 November 1953
- Place of birth: Sarajevo, FPR Yugoslavia
- Date of death: 17 May 1992 (aged 38)
- Place of death: Sarajevo, Bosnia and Herzegovina
- Position: Defender

Senior career*
Years	Team	Apps	(Gls)
–1974	Bosna Sarajevo		
1974–1983	Sarajevo	241	(14)
1983–1989	GAK	151	(14)
1984	→ Union Wels (loan)	16	(2)

International career
1977–1980	Yugoslavia	2	(0)
- * Club domestic league appearances and goals

Želimir "Keli" Vidović (17 November 1953 – 17 May 1992) was a Bosnian footballer and a star member of FK Sarajevo during the 1970s and early 1980s. He was killed during the Siege of Sarajevo while transporting wounded citizens of Dobrinja to a nearby hospital.

== Club career ==
Vidović joined FK Sarajevo in the summer of 1974 from local Sarajevo side FK Bosna. He played his first game for the maroon-whites on 14 August of the same year, and would go on to compete in 29 ties during his first season with the club. He spent nine years at the Koševo stadium, and was a pivotal member of the squad that played a large role in the 1980–81 UEFA Cup and reached the final of the Yugoslav Cup. In 1983, he joined Austrian side GAK, whom he represented for a further 6 seasons, before retiring from professional football in 1989.

== International career ==
He earned his first cap for Yugoslavia on 1 February 1977 in a friendly against Mexico, which Yugoslavia won 5–1. On 22 March 1980, he earned his second cap in a 2–1 victory over Uruguay.

== Death ==
On 17 May 1992, with the Siege of Sarajevo already underway, Vidović (who was an ethnic Serb) took part in a volunteer operation to help transport civilians, wounded by Serb forces, from nearby hospital in the Sarajevo neighbourhood of Dobrinja to Koševo hospital. After the convoy was stopped at a Serb military checkpoint, he was taken away by soldiers and all traces of him disappeared for four years. In 1996, his remains were discovered in a shallow mass grave along with the remains of three other people. On 5 June 2004, his remains were buried in Sarajevo, along with an FK Sarajevo jersey.

== Legacy ==
An annual tournament in his honour has been organized since 2004. A street in the neighborhood of Dobrinja carries his name. The FK Sarajevo Training Centre is named after him.

Documentary film, Heroj u kopačkama, by sport journalist Muhamed Bikić, premiered at the 72nd anniversary celebration of the FK Sarajevo, in National Theatre in Sarajevo on 24 October 2018.
