= 2009 NK Široki Brijeg–FK Sarajevo football riots =

2009 football riots in Široki Brijeg, Bosnia and Herzegovina

Široki Brijeg football riots
- Date: 4 October 2009
- Location: Pecara Stadium, Široki Brijeg, Bosnia and Herzegovina; 43°22′45.8″N 17°35′50.88″E
- Deaths: 1
- Injuries: 31 (6 severe)

The NK Široki Brijeg–FK Sarajevo football riot was a riot involving the football clubs NK Široki Brijeg (supported mostly by Herzegovian Croat fans) and FK Sarajevo (supported mostly by Bosniak fans) during a leg of the 2009 Bosnian-Herzegovian Premier League in the Herzegovian town of Široki Brijeg. During the riot members of Horde Zla ("Legions of Evil", a FK Sarajevo supporters group) and Škripari (a NK Široki Brijeg supporters group) confronted each other in altercations which subsequently spilled out to the majority of the town. Horde Zla burned cars and demolished shops while Škripari and residents of Široki Brijeg stoned Horde Zla buses and shot at supporters. Horde Zla also claim multiple counts of severe police brutality which led to the death of Horde Zla member Vedran Puljić from gunshot wounds.

== Riots ==
There are conflicting reports regarding who started the violence. Horde Zla accused local residents and police of mistreatment on their way to the match, saying that the incident was planned by local politicians and that their buses were separated and parked far from the stadium, which left them open to stoning and attacks. They also claim that initially there were only 30 local policemen present, and they did nothing to prevent the violence. Local police and residents said Horde Zla fans were the first to attack. According to local police officials, most of the regional police had earlier been sent to the nearby city of Mostar to prevent possible violence during the match between the rival Zrinjski and Velež clubs scheduled for the same day thus leaving the match in Široki Brijeg poorly secured.

Some 500 fans of the Sarajevo football club were present during the match in Široki Brijeg as well as between 150 and 200 members of the Red Army (supporters of FK Velež closely aligned with Horde Zla). According to Croatian media, members of Horde Zla had a history of starting riots in nearby Posušje and were involved in similar riots before. In September 1990, they had a conflict in Belgrade and stabbed 2 members of Grobari (supporters of FK Partizan). While Škripari have been accused by Bosnian media of harboring far-right Ustaše sympathies including displaying the Nazi swastika in their stands on multiple occasions.

31 people were injured in the riots, 6 of them severely. Some members of Horde Zla were arrested and put in custody. After Horde Zla spokespeople claimed they had reports that those members were being mistreated in prison, Federal Minister Of Justice Mirsad Kebo had them transferred to Sarajevo and released. This move was met with disapproval by citizens of Široki Brijeg.

=== Killing of Vedran Puljić ===
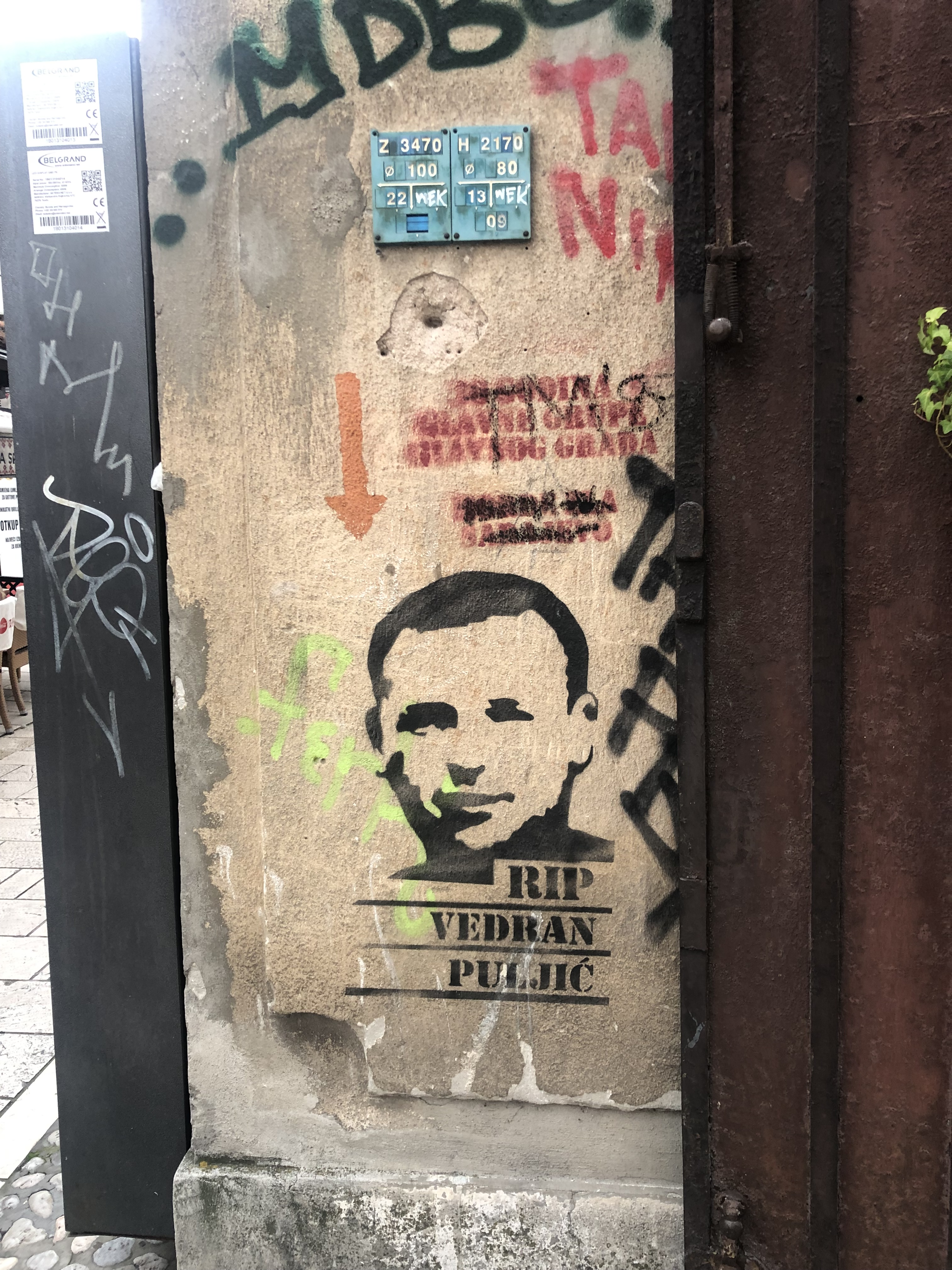
Graffiti in Sarajevo denoting "RIP Vedran Puljić"

One member of Horde, Vedran Puljić, a Sarajevo Croat, was shot and subsequently died. According to Zlatko Galić, the chief of West Herzegovina Canton police, Puljić had a record for multiple violations related to hooliganism. Police arrested Oliver Knezović as a suspect of shooting Puljić. Knezović is believed to be a former member of Kažnjenička Bojna unit of HVO. He reportedly fired at the FK Sarajevo supporters using a Kalashnikov automatic rifle. Knezović escaped from prison only hours after he was apprehended. Eight Široki Brijeg policemen were detained for allowing his escape.

More than 7,000 fans from FK Sarajevo, FK Željezničar, and other local clubs attended Puljić's funeral in Sarajevo.

Oliver Knezović fled to Zagreb, Croatia, where he would not be extradited to the authorities of Bosnia and Herzegovina, as there is no agreement on this issue between the two countries. He gave an interview for a local TV network, asserting his innocence. After the interview, Knezović surrendered to a Zagreb police station with his lawyer. An autopsy revealed that Puljić was killed by a bullet from a police pistol. Knezović reportedly had been shooting from an AK-47. Citing unnamed police sources, some media reported that Knezović took the pistol from an officer before shooting Puljić. Knezović said that he had taken the pistol but returned it to the policeman before the shooting. He later came to the police station, but escaped after claiming that the police were looking to arrest him for not only shooting at members of Horde Zla (which he does not dispute he did) but also for the murder of Vedran Puljić (which he claims was committed by someone else). Policeman Dragan Vujović was also taken into custody in relation to Puljić's murder. Citing unnamed police sources, some media reports claimed Vujović was being investigated as an accomplice to murder. Other media reports said that Vujović's hands tested positive for gunpowder residue, which he purportedly claimed was due to his coming into contact with the large quantities of fireworks used that day. Some reports claimed that the policeman had failed a polygraph test in relation to the event.

The incident was settled through what has been described as "dubious political manoeuvring" and did not result in any significant charges.

== Reactions ==
=== Široki Brijeg ===
During the following days many citizens had gathered in front of the West Herzegovina county headquarters. They blamed the violence on Horde Zla. Miro Kraljević, the mayor, addressed the audience giving them his support. The official representative of Škripari read a list of requests to the authorities of West Herzegovina county. The protesters left after a speech by Stanko Škorba, the president of the Union of handicapped veterans from the Homeland war. Škorba told them that the ministry of internal affairs had accepted to look into their requests.

The council of Široki Brijeg also held an emergency meeting. The counselors made a declaration denouncing the violence that occurred.

The protests were repeated the same week. There were between 13,000 and 15,000 protesters. Besides citizens of Široki Brijeg the fans of Croat dominated clubs from Mostar, Tomislavgrad, Livno, Žepče, Kiseljak, Posavina and a number of people from Croatia attended. Representatives of Škripari demanded the resignation of Mirsad Kebo and Zvonimir Jukić.

=== Sarajevo ===
In Sarajevo, members of Horde Zla also organized citywide demonstrations. They were joined by fans of Velež, Željezničar, Čelik, Rudar (Kakanj), Travnik, Sloboda and many other, mainly Bosniak, clubs as well as over 10,000 citizens.

They alleged that the causes for violence started even before they entered the town of Široki Brijeg in the form of provocations by local residents shouting ethnic slurs at them and gross negligence by the Široki Brijeg police which split them up into small unprotected groups and completely ignored any misconduct on the side of the Škripari up to and including doing nothing to stop the Škripari from hurling rocks at them. The supporters of many other Bosnian clubs present during the demonstrations have also reported that they were subject to similar ethnic provocations and willful police neglect when visiting Western Herzegovina.

They also expressed shock at the fact that as soon as physical confrontations broke out between them and the Škripari, the police started attacking members of Horde Zla in unison with Škripari and other local residents instead of doing their job of separating them. They demanded a thorough investigation into the misconduct of the Široki Brijeg police force which later confirmed that multiple policemen have been aiding and abetting assaults on members of Horde Zla including, in the case of policeman Dragan Vujović, being accomplices to murder. The events also had an ethnic cause, as they were seen as a fight between mostly Bosniak Muslim Horde Zla members and the Croat-dominated police. They also accused the police of ignoring local residents who had been shooting automatic weapons at the members of Horde Zla as in the case of Oliver Knezević who can be seen holding an AK-47 while being ignored by a nearby police officer on surveillance footage.
