= Valentin Ilievski =

Macedonian-German mechanical engineer

38th President of the Assembly of FK Sarajevo
- Incumbent
- Assumed office 19 December 2016
- Preceded by: Edis Kusturica

Personal details
- Born: 16 October 1968 (age 57) Kumanovo, SFR Yugoslavia
- Profession: Mechanical engineer, businessman

Valentin Ilievski (born 16 October 1968) is a Macedonian-German mechanical engineer, businessman, Senior Vice President South Eastern Europe Messer Group and 38th and current president of the assembly of FK Sarajevo since December 2016, taking charge of the club from his predecessor Edis Kusturica.
