= FK Bosna Sarajevo =

FK Bosna
- Founded: 1947
- Ground: Koševo II Sarajevo
- Capacity: 500
- Chairman: Suad Alibašić

Fudbalski Klub Bosna is a football club from Sarajevo, Bosnia and Herzegovina, founded in 1947. It is the oldest club in the University Sport Society USD Bosna, (Bosnian: Univerzitetsko Sportsko Društvo Bosna) founded in the same year.

== History ==
The club played its first match on 12 December 1947. For the first few years it competed in the Republic Leagues, though these were folded in 1951. The club competed at national level in the disputed Yugoslav Second League. In 1968–69 the club reached third place in the South Zone of the Second League. Afterwards the club was relegated into lower leagues. With the establishment of the BiH League, FK Bosna began competing in the second division. Its senior section last played in the lower tier Cantonal League of the Football Association of Sarajevo Canton.

== Players ==
Some of the best known FK Bosna Sarajevo players include Želimir Vidović, Said Fazlagić, Branislav Petričević, Nijaz Brković, Šener Bajramović, Damir Mirvić and Nijaz Mulahmetović. The famous Bosnian singer, Muhamed Fazlagić, played for Bosna for several years as a center back. FK Bosna is also known for its youth academy, which is currently headed by Samir Jahić and Senadin Slato.
