= Boško Baškot =

28th President of the Football Association of Yugoslavia
- In office 1965–1967
- Preceded by: Aleksandar Jovančević
- Succeeded by: Dragoljub Kirčanski

4th and 6th President of the Assembly of FK Sarajevo
- In office 1953–1954
- Preceded by: Miloš Samardžić
- Succeeded by: Slobodan Kezunović
- In office 1950–1951
- Preceded by: Miloš Samardžić
- Succeeded by: Miloš Samardžić

Personal details
- Born: 11 June 1922 Prijedor, Kingdom of Serbs, Croats and Slovenes
- Died: 19 March 2013 (aged 90) Banja Luka, Bosnia and Herzegovina
- Party: SKJ
- Profession: Politician, Sports administrator

Boško Baškot (Serbian Cyrillic: Бошко Башкот; 11 June 1922 – 19 March 2013) was a notable Yugoslav Partisan and Bosnian politician, Minister of the Interior of SR Bosnia and Herzegovina and sports administrator.
