= Zagorac (surname) =

Zagorac (Serbian Cyrillic: Загорац) is a Serbo-Croatian surname, meaning "man from beyond the mountain". It may refer to:

- Danijel Zagorac, Croatian footballer
- Milan Zagorac, Serbian footballer
- Slavko Zagorac, Serbian footballer
- Rade Zagorac, Serbian basketball player
- Željko Zagorac, Slovenian basketball player
- Saša Zagorac, Slovenian basketball player
