= Srboljub Markušević =

Yugoslav Serbian footballer and manager (1936–2019)

Personal information
- Full name: Srboljub Markušević
- Date of birth: 5 May 1936
- Place of birth: Prizren, Kingdom of Yugoslavia
- Date of death: 18 November 2019 (aged 83)
- Place of death: Belgrade, Serbia
- Position: Winger

Youth career
- 1947–1955: Sarajevo

Senior career*
Years	Team	Apps	(Gls)
1955–1965	Sarajevo	148	(22)
Total		148	(22)

Managerial career
- 1966–1969: Sarajevo (youth)
- 1970–1971: Sarajevo
- 1972–1973: Sarajevo
- 1981–1983: Sarajevo
- 1986: Budućnost Titograd
- 1990: Sarajevo
- * Club domestic league appearances and goals

Srboljub Markušević (Serbian Cyrillic: Србољуб Маркушевић; 5 May 1936 – 18 November 2019) was a Yugoslav and later Serbian professional footballer and football manager.

== Playing career ==
Markušević spent his entire playing career at Bosnian club Sarajevo, making 148 league appearances for the club and scoring 22 goals. Along with 132 friendly games he played for Sarajevo, Markušević played 280 games for the team in total

== Managerial career ==
After ending his career, Markušević became a football manager, starting out as a coach in the youth team of Sarajevo in 1966.

He then became a manager and led the first team of Sarajevo on four separate occasions (1969–1971, 1972–1973, 1981–1983 and 1990). His biggest managerial achievement with Sarajevo and in his whole career was leading the team to the round of 16 in the 1982–83 UEFA Cup season. Markušević also led Sarajevo to being Yugoslav Cup runners-up in the 1982–83 season.

In between his third and fourth appointment at Sarajevo, He managed Budućnost Podgorica in the second part of the 1985–86 season.

== Death ==
Markušević died on 19 November 2019 in Belgrade, Serbia at the age of 83.

== Honours ==
=== Player ===
Sarajevo

- Yugoslav Second League: 1957–58 (zone II A)
- Yugoslav First League runner up: 1964–65

=== Manager ===
Sarajevo

- Yugoslav Cup runner up: 1982–83
