= Zagorac, Višegrad =

Zagorac
- Village
- Location of Zagorac
- Coordinates: 43°42′11″N 19°12′15″E
- Country: Bosnia and Herzegovina
- Entity: Republika Srpska
- Municipality: Višegrad

Population (1991)
  - Total: 19
- Time zone: UTC+1 (CET)
  - Summer (DST): UTC+2 (CEST)

Zagorac (Serbian: Загорац) is a village in the municipality of Višegrad, Bosnia and Herzegovina.
