= Safet Alajbegović =

Yugoslav footballer

Personal information
- Date of birth: 12 June 1928
- Place of birth: Sarajevo, Kingdom of Serbs, Croats and Slovenes
- Date of death: 8 November 1990 (aged 62)
- Place of death: Sarajevo, SFR Yugoslavia
- Position: Defender

Senior career*
Years	Team	Apps	(Gls)
1946–1947	Željezničar	18	(0)
1947–1954	Sarajevo	121	(0)
1954–1956	Uljanik	24	(0)
- * Club domestic league appearances and goals

Safet Alajbegović (12 June 1928 – 8 November 1990) was a Bosnian and Yugoslav professional footballer.

== Career ==
Alajbegović played the position of defender most notably for Yugoslav First League side FK Sarajevo, as well as for FK Željezničar and NK Uljanik. After retiring from professional football, Alajbegović graduated from the University of Sarajevo with a degree in mechanical engineering and subsequently had an illustrious career as an engineer
