= Haad (company) =

Bosnian fashion house

Adnan Hajrulahović Haad
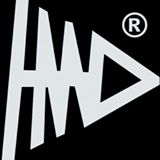
- Born: 22 August 1980 (age 45); Doboj, SFR Yugoslavia
- Labels: Haad Fashion Group (2004); Haad basic (2009); Haad get a game (2013)
- Awards: Asian link Award 2005
- Website: haad.ba

Haad is a Bosnian fashion house launched by designer Adnan Hajrulahović. His fashion studio is based in Sarajevo, Bosnia and Herzegovina. In 2013 Adnan Hajrulahović started his Get a game sports line, signing a kit sponsorship agreement with Bosnian football club FK Sarajevo.

On 31 March 2015 the label signed a kit sponsorship agreement with the Basketball Federation of Bosnia and Herzegovina. In May 2015 Haad Get a game opened a new factory in Zenica for the purpose of expanding its production. In the 2017-2018 Premier League BH season Haad has dropped an other important technical supplier deal with the football section of FK Velež Mostar, for 2 season duration.
