= FK Sarajevo =

Association football club in Bosnia and Herzegovina

Sarajevo
- Full name: Fudbalski klub Sarajevo
- Nickname: Bordo-bijeli (The Maroon-Whites)
- Short name: FKS, SAR
- Founded: 24 October 1946; 80 years ago as FD Torpedo
- Ground: Koševo City Stadium
- Capacity: 34,700
- Owner(s): Ismir Mirvić (98.26%); Others (1.74%)
- President: Ismir Mirvić
- Manager: Zoran Zekić
- League: Premier League BH
- 2025–26: Premier League BH, 3rd of 10
- Website: www.fksarajevo.ba
| Home colours | Away colours |

Fudbalski klub Sarajevo (Bosnian pronunciation: [fǔdbaːlskiː klûːb sarajěʋo]; lit. ' Football Club Sarajevo'), is a professional football club based in Sarajevo, the capital city of Bosnia and Herzegovina and is one of the most successful clubs in the country.

Founded on 24 October 1946, FK Sarajevo was the most successful club from SR Bosnia and Herzegovina in Yugoslavia, winning two Yugoslav First League titles, finishing runners-up on two other occasions, reaching the Yugoslav Cup final twice and placing 6th in the Yugoslav First League all-time table.

Today, FK Sarajevo is one of the most prominent members of the Premier League of Bosnia and Herzegovina, where it has won five Bosnian championships, eight Bosnian Cups and one Bosnian Supercup. Furthermore, the club finished runners-up in the national championship another seven times. It is ranked second in the Premier League of Bosnia and Herzegovina all-time table. FK Sarajevo is the most popular football club in the country, alongside FK Željezničar, with whom it shares a fierce rivalry in the Sarajevo derby, often called the Eternal derby (Bosnian: Vječiti derbi). This fixture is not only Bosnia and Herzegovina's premier football rivalry, but it has also been recognized internationally, being featured among FourFourTwo’s 50 Biggest Derbies in the World.

The club plays its home matches at the Asim Ferhatović Hase Stadium, also known as the Koševo Stadium, named after legendary club striker Asim Ferhatović, and located in the city's Koševo neighborhood. The stadium has a current capacity of 34,700 and is the largest in the country. FK Sarajevo also operates the Butmir Training Centre in the Ilidža municipality, a state-of-the-art facility spanning 70,000 m² and opened in 2015. The centre includes multiple FIFA-standard pitches, modern fitness and rehabilitation infrastructure, and serves as the training base for the men’s, women’s, youth teams and Sarajevo B.

The traditional colours of the club are maroon and white, with the home kit traditionally consisting of a maroon shirt, white shorts, and maroon socks - a combination that has become one of the most iconic and recognizable in Yugoslav and Bosnian sports. The club’s historic nickname is the Maroon-Whites (Bosnian: Bordo-bijeli), in reference to its traditional maroon and white colours. Over the decades, the club has also been affectionately known as the Sarajevan Aghas (Bosnian: Age Sarajlije), a nickname that alludes both to the Ottoman-era aghas and to a well-known sevdalinka, "Vino piju nane age Sarajlije", which nostalgically evokes the city’s cultural identity. In recent years, another popular nickname has emerged: The Giants (Bosnian: Divovi), inspired by Benjamin Isović’s football ballad, "Mi smo divovi" (English: We Are Giants), which subsequently became the club’s official anthem.

In addition to its domestic achievements, FK Sarajevo is widely regarded as the most significant exporter of footballing talent in Bosnia and Herzegovina. The club holds seven out of the ten highest player transfer fees in the history of Bosnian football, underlining its role as an incubator of talent for European leagues. The club’s success in the transfer market is largely attributed to its renowned youth academy, which has consistently produced top-tier talent for both domestic competitions and European clubs.

Beyond its sporting achievements, FK Sarajevo holds a significant role in the social and cultural landscape of the capital. The club reflects Sarajevo’s multicultural character and has a broad support base representing diverse communities within the city, country and the wider region.

== History ==
FK Sarajevo was the only major football club founded by the post-war Yugoslav authorities in the city of Sarajevo. The club entered the Yugoslav First League in the 1948–49 season, and eventually competed in all but two seasons in the top tier. After Bosnia and Herzegovina gained independence from Yugoslavia, FK Sarajevo became one of the country's biggest ambassadors, departing on a large world tour during the Bosnian War with the goal of gaining international support for the country's cause.

=== Origins ===
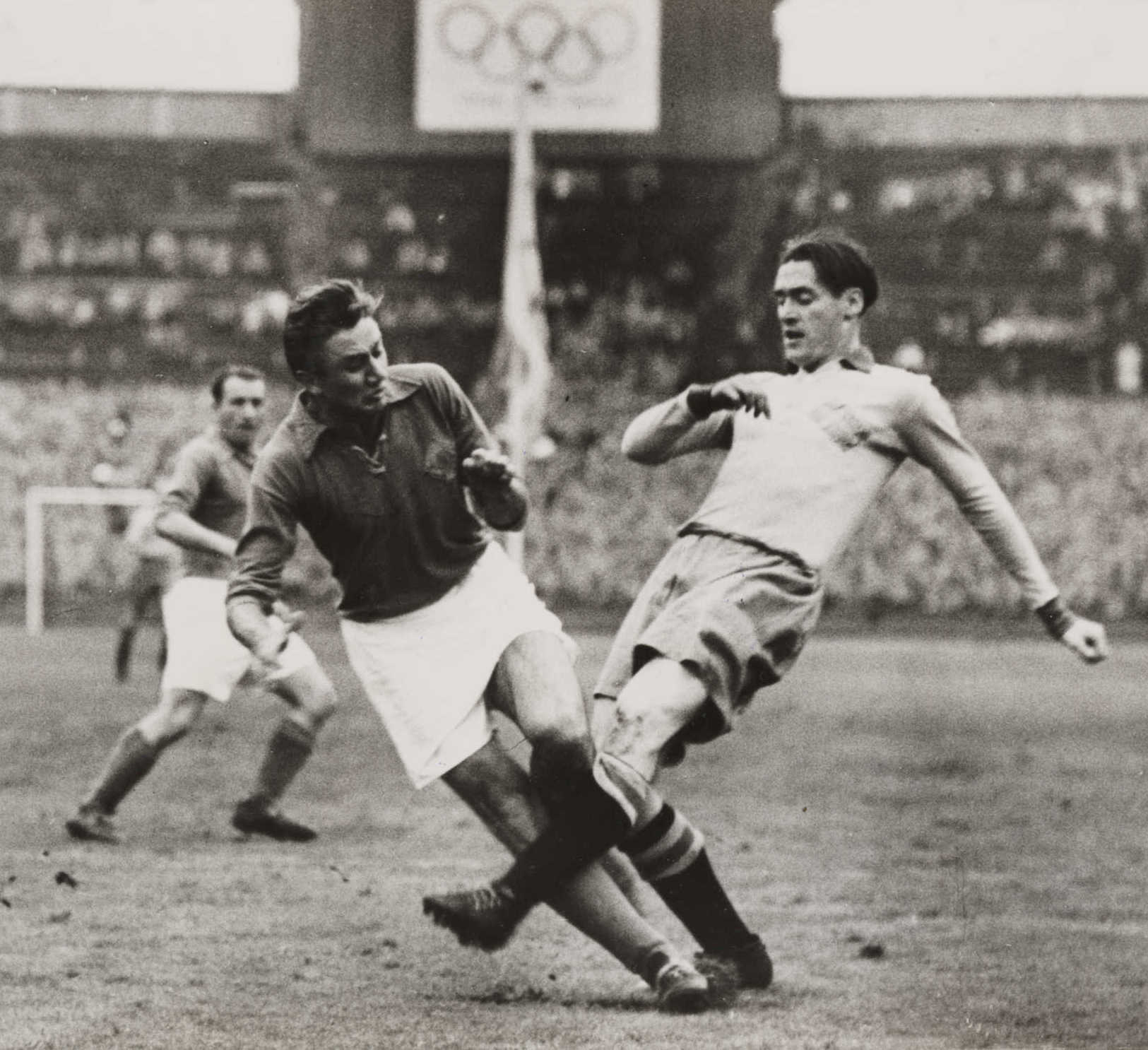
Miroslav Brozović (center), pictured representing Yugoslavia at the 1948 Summer Olympics, was named player-coach of Sarajevo in September of the same year

FK Sarajevo was established on 24 October 1946, at a meeting held in the main hall of the FIS building, as the result of a merger between local Sarajevo football clubs Udarnik (Vanguard) and Sloboda (Liberty). The club first appeared on the Yugoslav sports scene in 1946 under the name Fiskulturno društvo Torpedo (English: Gymnastics Society Torpedo), a homage to Torpedo Moscow. The first chairman of the newly founded club was Safet Džinović, while the positions of vice-chairmen were granted to Vojo Marković and Alojz Stanarević respectively. Furthermore, Josip Bulat was named manager.

A commemorative plaque on the FIS building in central Sarajevo signifies the site where the club was established

On 5 October 1947, on the proposal of then-editor-in-chief of the popular daily newspaper Oslobođenje, Mirko Ostojić, the club name was changed to Fiskulturno društvo Sarajevo (English: Gymnastics Society Sarajevo), before being changed yet again to Sportsko društvo metalaca Sarajevo (English: Sports Society of Metalworkers Sarajevo) a year later. Finally, on 20 May 1949 the name Fudbalski klub Sarajevo was adopted. The newly formed team, which inherited the results and league standings of Udarnik, was joined by selected players from both Udarnik and Sloboda. Namely, Hodžić, Vlajičić, Šarenkapa, Pauković, Fizović, Konjević, Radović, Viđen and Mustagrudić from the former, and Mantula, Glavočević, Tošić, Pecelj, Novo, Strinić, Đ. Lovrić and Alajbegović from the latter. The team played its first match on 3 November 1946. In September 1948 SDM Sarajevo was joined by Yugoslav footballing legend Miroslav Brozović, who brought in a largely needed level of experience to the new team. The Mostar native previously wore the black and white jersey of FK Partizan, as well as captaining the Yugoslavia national team. Brozović was offered the position of player-manager which he accepted, turning his attention to promoting the team to the Yugoslav First League. FK Sarajevo first entered the top-flight Yugoslav First League after eliminating Belgrade club Sloga. They drew the first match 3:3 in Novi Sad, but then won the second match 5:1 in Sarajevo. The team was relegated after its first season in the First League but was promoted back to the top tier in 1950. From then on FK Sarajevo played in every season of the First League apart from 1957-58. The club's first taste of European competitions began during the 1960s when it took part in the 1960 Mitropa Cup and the 1961–63 Balkans Cup, while the first continent-wide European competition the club took part in was the 1962–63 Intertoto Cup.

=== Champions of Yugoslavia - Bosnian breakthrough ===
Until FK Sarajevo's historic triumph, no club from any republic outside of SR Serbia and SR Croatia had ever claimed the Yugoslav First League title. The league had long been dominated by the so-called "Big Four" of Yugoslav football, but the Bosnian breakthrough finally arrived in the 1966–67 season, when FK Sarajevo emerged as champions. This victory not only marked a significant milestone for Bosnian football but also ended an unprecedented eight-season dominance by clubs from SR Serbia, who had held the national crown uninterrupted.

==== The 1960s: First championship ====
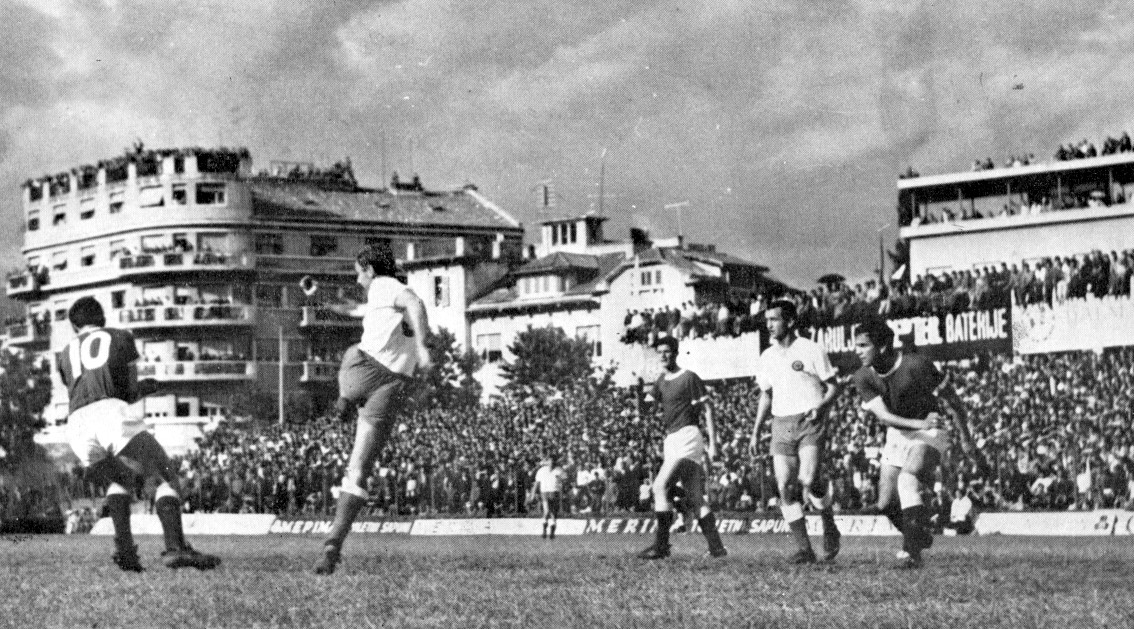
Stadion "Stari plac" in Split - host of the 1966–67 Yugoslav Cup final between Hajduk Split and Sarajevo

Friend, I can't play for money while being directed by others on how to play. I'm grateful they were fair and didn't make a fuss about it. I told them I could only play for Sarajevo.

— Asim Ferhatović, in an interview, after returning from a short stint with Fenerbahçe

A key player for Sarajevo in their early years was the legendary striker Asim Ferhatović, known as Hase, who played for the club from 1952 to 1967. In the 1963–64 season, he was the top scorer in the First League with nineteen goals, leading the club to a fourth-place finish. The following year, Sarajevo finished second to Partizan Belgrade. In the 1966–67 season, Sarajevo won their first Yugoslav First League title, becoming the first national champions from Bosnia and Herzegovina. The historic season began with Brozović as head coach, and the team had a strong start with consecutive wins against Sutjeska Nikšić and city rivals Željezničar, followed by a draw against European Cup runners-up Partizan. Despite an early lead, Sarajevo managed seven points from their first three fixtures and, though not initially considered title favorites, they gained momentum with a victory against Hajduk Split on the Dalmatian coast. Four days later, Sarajevo defeated Olimpija 2–1 at a sold-out Koševo Stadium. Hard-fought wins against Rijeka and Red Star Belgrade followed, and by the winter break, Sarajevo had won 14 of their first 20 league matches, finishing the year in first place.

The second part of the season opened with a 1–0 away win against Dinamo Zagreb in the last sixteen of the Yugoslav Cup, thanks to a stunning goal by Boško Antić. Although Sarajevo advanced past Napredak in the quarterfinals, they eventually lost in the Cup final to Hajduk Split at the Stari plac Stadium on May 24. The team quickly rebounded, defeating Red Star 3–1 at the Rajko Mitić Stadium, with two goals from Antić and one from Prodanović. A week later, they beat OFK Beograd by the same margin, but a surprising defeat to Vojvodina in Novi Sad left them tied with Dinamo Zagreb with three games remaining. Sarajevo then defeated Vardar with a Musemić brace, while Dinamo dropped points in Rijeka. In the final league match of the season, Sarajevo hosted Čelik Zenica in front of 30,000 spectators and won 5–2, securing the club's first league title.

===== European Cup last 16 =====
Sarajevo's tour of Kuwait in 1969 was one of many international tours the club undertook during the 1950s and 1960s, which included notable trips across Africa, the Middle East, and South America

The league triumph qualified Sarajevo to the 1967–68 European Cup (today's UEFA Champions League), where they played their first tie against Cypriots Olympiakos Nicosia, winning 5:3 on aggregate. In the second round (one round short of the quarter-finals), Sarajevo was knocked out 2:1 on aggregate by eventual champions Manchester United of England, despite hosting a goalless draw in the first leg. The first leg was played before an audience of 40,000 spectators and refereed by the Italian Francesco Francescon. The second leg played at Old Trafford ended in controversy after the ball went out of bounds prior to the hosts scoring their second goal. Notable Sarajevo players during this era included Boško Antić, Mirsad Fazlagić, Vahidin Musemić, Fahrudin Prljača and Boško Prodanović.

Shortly after winning its first Yugoslav league title FK Sarajevo endured a period of general stagnation. The team entered the 1967/68 season as strong title favorites, but the campaign turned out to be a complete disaster. The maroon-whites, managed by former player Franjo Lovrić, did not manage to enter the championship race in hopes of defending the title, finishing mere 7th. The club management quickly named Munib Saračević manager for the 1968/69 season, but this move also turned out to be fruitless. The team concluded the disappointing campaign 11th in the league standings. In the January 1971 transfer window, six members of the championship-winning generation, including Prodanović, Tešan, and Prljača, left the club. Three more players, including star player Boško Antić, departed in July of the same year. Despite a promising start to the next season, where the team led at the winter break, they only managed to finish 7th by the end of the season. The 1973–74 season saw the arrival of several new players, including future club legend Želimir Vidović and former Red Star Belgrade and Bayern Munich striker Dušan Jovanović. Additionally, 18-year-old Safet Sušić joined from Krivaja Zavidovići and would soon become a key player, driving the club to a second significant era of success in Yugoslav football. In the first eleven seasons following their 1967 title win, FK Sarajevo's best achievements were a single 6th place league finish, two 7th place league finishes, and a quarter-final appearance in the Yugoslav Cup during the 1976–77 season. In the same year, the club narrowly avoided relegation, finishing just two points ahead of Napredak Kruševac. However, the 1978–79 season brought renewed hope for Sarajevo fans as the team finished 4th, behind Hajduk Split, Dinamo Zagreb, and Red Star Belgrade, signaling better times ahead.

==== The 1980s: Second championship ====

FK Sarajevo winning squad – 1984–85 Yugoslav First League champions

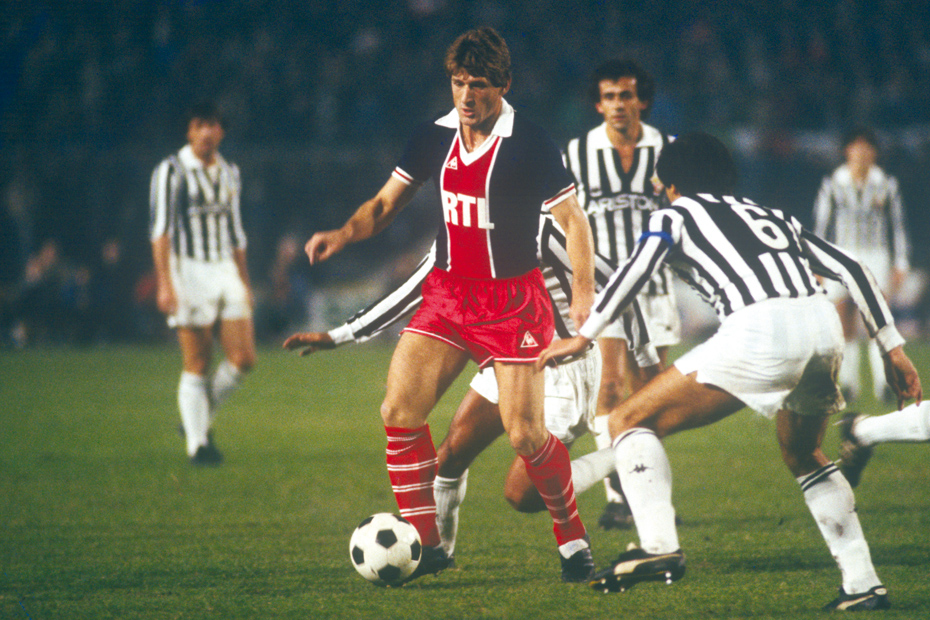
Safet Sušić (centre) played for the club for nearly a decade before transferring to Paris Saint-Germain. He later managed the Bosnia and Herzegovina at the 2014 FIFA World Cup

Sarajevo enjoyed a second successful period between 1978 and 1985, driven by the dynamic attacking duo of Predrag Pašić and Safet Sušić. This pair became one of the most prolific tandems in Yugoslav and Bosnian football history. Predrag Pašić, nicknamed "Paja," was a winger or striker who rose through the club's youth ranks and played for Sarajevo until his move to VfB Stuttgart after the title-winning season in 1985. Safet Sušić, known as "Pape," was a playmaker and attacking midfielder who donned the maroon and white jersey from 1973 until his transfer to Paris Saint-Germain in 1982. In the 1978–79 season, Sušić scored 15 goals and was named Player of the Season as Sarajevo finished fourth. The following year, his 17 goals not only retained his Player of the Year title but also made him the joint-top scorer in the league.

In the 1979–80 season, Sarajevo finished as runners-up, seven points behind Red Star Belgrade, therefore qualifying for the 1980–81 UEFA Cup. Sarajevo was knocked out in the first round by German powerhouse Hamburger SV, which won 7–5 on aggregate. Sarajevo returned to the UEFA Cup in 1982–83 (having finished fourth during the 1981–82 season), beating Bulgaria's Slavia Sofia 6–4 in the first round and Romanian club Corvinul Hunedoara 8–4 in the second, thanks to a 4–0 home win in the second leg. In the third round (last 16), Sarajevo lost the first leg 6–1 to Belgian club RSC Anderlecht, and despite winning the second leg 1–0, were eliminated by the eventual champions. Sarajevo also reached the Yugoslav Cup final that season, losing 3–2 to Dinamo Zagreb in Belgrade. Sarajevo secured their second championship title in the 1984–85 season, finishing four points ahead of runners-up Hajduk Split. The new championship season for Sarajevo didn't start spectacularly, but as it progressed, the team gained momentum and secured first place by the winter break. Boško Antić's team struggled at the beginning of the second half of the season, earning only two points from their first three matches. Their main rival, Hajduk Split, also had a slow start, winning just one of their first three games, which allowed Sarajevo to maintain a one-point lead. Antić's squad then defeated Sloboda and drew with Dinamo Zagreb and Željezničar before traveling to Split for a crucial match against Hajduk. A packed Poljud Stadium saw a 0–0 draw, preserving Sarajevo's narrow lead.

The title race ultimately came down to Sarajevo and Hajduk Split, with both teams securing hard-fought victories. Three games before the season's end, Hajduk had a straightforward win over Rijeka, while Sarajevo faced a tough match in Novi Sad against Vojvodina. The hosts scored early, but Sarajevo equalized ten minutes before the break through a Jakovljević goal and eventually won seven minutes from time with a stunning volley from Slaviša Vukićević.

Now needing just five points from their last three games to clinch the title, Sarajevo achieved a routine 3–0 victory over Iskra, followed by a challenging 2–2 draw against Vardar in Skopje, after coming back from a 2–0 deficit just before halftime. Everything hinged on the final league game against Red Star Belgrade at a sold-out Koševo Stadium, where Sarajevo needed just a point to secure the title. Musemić opened the scoring in the 23rd minute, and Jakovljević doubled the lead with fifteen minutes remaining. Although Boško Gjurovski pulled one back for the visitors in the 85th minute, it was too late to change the outcome. The celebrations began, Sarajevo had won its second Yugoslav league title. The triumph qualified the club for the first round of the 1985–86 European Cup, where they shockingly lost both legs to Finnish side Kuusysi Lahti. This result is still considered Sarajevo's worst in major European competitions.

The championship winning generation included the likes of Husref Musemić, Faruk Hadžibegić, Davor Jozić, Dragan Jakovljević, Miloš Đurković, Predrag Pašić, Mirza Kapetanović, Slaviša Vukićević, Zijad Švrakić, Senad Merdanović and Mehmed Janjoš.

===== Final years in Yugoslavia =====
FK Sarajevo entered a turbulent period after clinching its second Yugoslav league title. Three major members of the championship-winning squad left the team in the summer of 1985. Star striker Husref Musemić joined Red Star Belgrade. Faruk Hadžibegić moved to Spanish side Real Betis. Team captain Predrag Pašić moved to VfB Stuttgart in the Bundesliga. The club management, in search of replacements, turned its sights to young players from lower-tier sides, bringing in Bernard Barnjak, Vladimir Petković and Zoran Ljubičić. Even though the team started the season on a high note, it finished a disappointing 15th at the end of the 1985/86 season, avoiding relegation by virtue of a superior goal difference compared to relegated OFK Beograd. The following season again culminated in a lowly finish, as new manager Denijel Pirić led the team to a disappointing 13th place in the league standings. Further departures followed at the end of the season as Miloš Đurković joined Beşiktaş, Muhidin Teskeredžić made the move to Sturm Graz, Davor Jozić joined Serie A side Cesena, Zijad Švrakić transferred to Adana Demirspor and Branko Bošnjak joined Olimpija. The following two seasons again brought mediocre league finishes as the maroon-whites concluded the respective campaigns on 13th and 14th spots, barely avoiding relegation on both occasions. As with previous seasons, a handful of players left the club during the summer transfer window, with Slaviša Vukićević moving to Créteil, goalkeeper Enver Lugušić joining Konyaspor and Dragan Jakovljević moving to Nantes. On a positive note, the 1989–90 season brought the return of fan-favorite Husref Musemić, who had spent the previous season playing for Scottish side Hearts. His nine goals in 26 appearances did little to improve league results, as the team again concluded the campaign in 13th spot, along with an early exit in the Yugoslav Cup after a defeat to Macedonian third division minnows, Sileks. The 1990-91 season saw Fuad Muzurović again being named manager after a ten-year absence. Furthermore, Soviet goalkeeper Aleksei Prudnikov was brought in from Velež Mostar, thus becoming the first foreign player in the history of the club. The team was able to conclude the season in 11th spot, defeating Red Star Belgrade in a crucial, hallmark game, only days after the Belgrade outfit won the European Cup. The 1991-92 season was marked by the disintegration of Yugoslavia, and was subsequently abandoned by Slovenian, Croatian and Bosnian sides. Football was abruptly halted in Bosnia and Herzegovina for the duration of the war that would last for four years. Notable FK Sarajevo players in the pre-war period were Miloš Nedić, Dragan Jakovljević, Boban Božović, Dane Kuprešanin and Dejan Raičković.

=== Recent years ===
Since the Bosnian independence, the club has won 14 domestic trophies, 5 of which were Premier League of Bosnia and Herzegovina honors. In addition the club reached play-off stage/final qualifying round for European competitions on 4 occasions, once for UCL (vs Dynamo Kyiv) and three for UEL (vs CFR Cluj, Borussia Mönchengladbach and Celtic).

==== War and independence ====
The Bosnian War in the early 1990s shut down competitive football in the territory, and as a result FK Sarajevo became a touring club in 1993, under manager Fuad Muzurović, featuring players such as Elvir Baljić, Almir Turković, Senad Repuh and Mirza Varešanović, all future national team players for Bosnia and Herzegovina. Many of the club's supporters, including the infamous Horde Zla joined the Army of the Republic of Bosnia and Herzegovina and fought in the war. FK Sarajevo played a number of friendly games during this time, such as the now-famous 4–1 victory over the local UN peacekeeping force in 1994, a 1–1 draw against Parma F.C. while on tour in Italy, and a 3–1 victory over the Iranian national team in Teheran.

In 1994–95, the first-ever Bosnia and Herzegovina championship was held. Sarajevo came first in their six-team league in Jablanica, and came runners-up in the final league stage in Zenica, behind local club Čelik. Sarajevo again finished as runners-up to Čelik in 1996–97 (by two points), but beat the Zenica-based club in the Cup final and Super Cup. The Cup was retained the following year, and despite finishing third in the league, Sarajevo was runner-up due to play-offs. There was no play-off in 1998–99; the title was given to Sarajevo but it does not count.

In 2004, Safet Sušić, who played at FK Sarajevo from 1973 to 1982, was voted Bosnia and Herzegovina's best player of the last 50 years at the UEFA Jubilee Awards. Sarajevo were runners-up in the Bosnia and Herzegovina Premier League in 2006–07, but won their second title the following season, beating Zrinjski Mostar by three points. Sarajevo have been a regular in Europa League qualification in the 21st century, but are yet to make the group stages. Off the back of their 2006–07 league title under manager Husref Musemić, Sarajevo played in the UEFA Champions League for the first time in its current format. They beat Maltese champions Marsaxlokk F.C. 6:0 away in their first game, eventually winning 9:1 on aggregate. The second round saw Sarajevo defeat Belgians KRC Genk on away goals due to a 2:1 away win in the first leg, although the club was knocked out in the play-offs for the competition's Group stage by Ukrainian champions Dynamo Kyiv who won 4:0 on aggregate. The club made the play-offs round of the 2009–10 UEFA Europa League and faced CFR Cluj but lost 3–2 on aggregate. The team defeated Spartak Trnava and Helsingborg to get to the playoff round.

==== Vincent Tan era: A financial injection ====
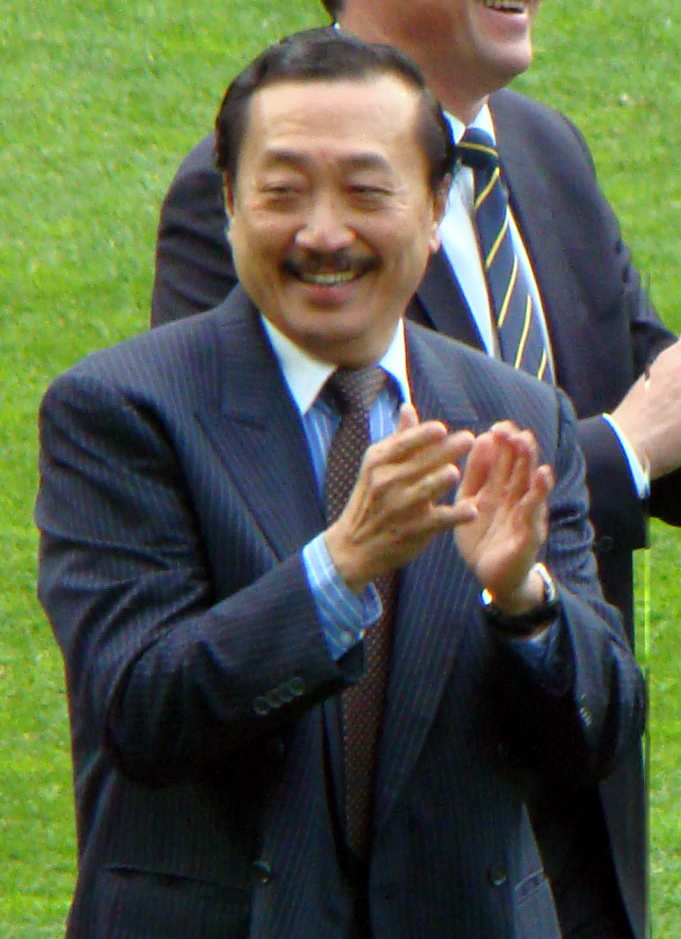
Vincent Tan was worth an estimated US$1.6 billion in 2014

Vincent Tan, a Malaysian businessman and the owner of the Championship club Cardiff City, bought FK Sarajevo in late 2013 pledging to invest $2 million into the club. Under the deal, Cardiff will cooperate with FK Sarajevo, exchanging players and taking part in a football academy, yet to be established, which Tan has said would lure new talents. Under Tan's management the club brought in quality players with the likes of Miloš Stojčev, Džemal Berberović and Nemanja Bilbija who helped the club win the 2013–14 Bosnian Cup, their first silverware since winning the Premier League in 2006–07. Prior to the Cup triumph, Robert Jarni was brought in as the new manager of the club in December 2013 by Tan, but was quickly dismissed only 4 months into his tenure (on 7 April 2014, while the team was still in the semi-finals of the Bosnian Cup) due to the team failing to keep its chances of winning the domestic league title alive during later stages of the 2013–14 season. FK Sarajevo played a friendly match against Tan's Cardiff City U21 winning 4–1. In 2014–15 UEFA Europa League, FK Sarajevo eliminated FK Haugesund and Atromitos to qualify for the play-off round, where it lost to German side Borussia Mönchengladbach.

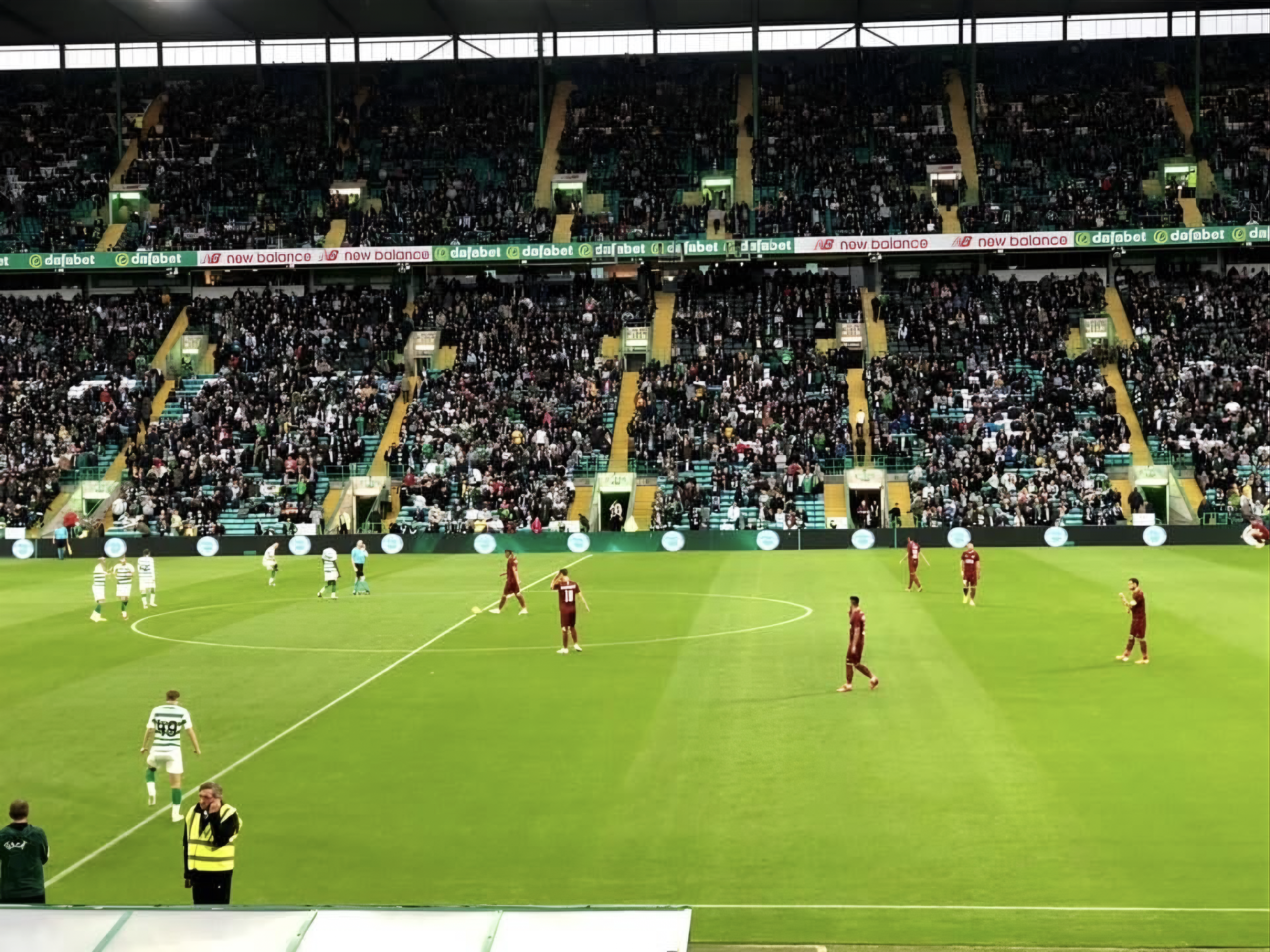
Sarajevo during the away leg of their UEFA Champions League qualifier against Celtic at Celtic Park, 17 July 2019

On 26 September 2014, manager Dženan Uščuplić was relieved of his duties as first-team manager and was transferred back to the youth academy. On 30 September 2014, former Barcelona, Real Sociedad and Bosnia and Herzegovina national team striker Meho Kodro was appointed manager. On 24 February 2015, Sarajevo signed a three-and-a-half-year general sponsorship agreement with Turkish Airlines which has been labeled the most lucrative in Bosnian professional sports history. On 21 April, after poor league results, the club sacked Kodro and once again named Dženan Uščuplić manager until the end of the season. On 30 May the team defeated Sloboda Tuzla in the season's last fixture, thus winning the league title after an eight-year drought. The next season was a turbulent one for the club. After Uščuplić left his post, former Partizan and CSKA Sofia manager Miodrag Ješić took over the helm, only to be sacked after a string of disappointing results, with Almir Hurtić leading the side to a disappointing 4th-place finish in the league. On 29 August 2016, after another string of bad results at the start of the 2016–17 season, Hurtić was sacked and Mehmed Janjoš was named manager.

==== Club's domestic revival ====
Since March 2019, FK Sarajevo is run by Vietnamese businessman Nguyễn Hoài Nam and the PVF Investment and Trading, JSC (Promotion Fund of Vietnamese Football Talents F.C.). The club won back to back titles in Bosnia under managers Husref Musemić and Vinko Marinović; both 2018–19 and 2019–20 seasons of the Bosnian Premier League and a 2018–19 Bosnian Cup triumph as well.

Since the onset of the COVID‑19 pandemic in 2020, FK Sarajevo faced a severe financial crisis as investments by the owner, matchday revenues, sponsorships, and commercial activities all but vanished. The club remained in a precarious situation until a pivotal ownership overhaul in mid‑2021 and early 2023. In August 2021, Bosnian‑American businessman Ismir Mirvić joined as a majority investor, and in early 2023, he formally became club president and head of operations alongside Vincent Tan's renewed active involvement in management and ownership. This ushered in a period of aggressive investment, characterized by record transfer expenditures and a rapid turnover of managers, each serving only short tenures. The revitalization culminated in Sarajevo ending a five‑season trophy drought by capturing the 2024–25 Bosnian Cup under Mirvić's ownership.

== Crest and colours ==
The 2007–08 season home jersey in traditional maroon colours

First kit in traditional maroon

The club's colours are maroon and white, while in recent years burgundy, black, and gold have also been used as alternative club colours. The club’s traditional home kit typically consists of a maroon jersey, paired with white shorts and maroon socks. Originally, the club colours were sky blue and white. The change came about in the summer of 1962 when Sarajevo was drawn with Servette FC in the Rapan Cup, whose captain was former Sarajevo player Lav Mantula. After their fixture in Sarajevo, Mantula visited the club offices, and in a conversation with the management, suggested that Sarajevo adopt Servette's club colours because no team in Yugoslavia at the time had maroon as its main colour. The idea was accepted at the next club assembly, officially establishing maroon as the club’s defining colour. Maroon has since become deeply embedded in the club’s visual identity and is widely recognized throughout Sarajevo and Bosnia and Herzegovina. The club also uses deep maroon (Pantone 4625 C / #5D0D10) and white (Pantone 7436 C / #FFFFFF) in its branding.

The first official club crest featured a red star, a five-pointed symbol that has historically been associated with communist ideology and was commonly used across post-WWII Yugoslavia. In 1949, the crest was modified to feature golden borders enclosing a golden silhouette of a footballer. Additionally, a blue industrial gear within a circular frame, symbolizing socialist industrialization, included the club's name. In 1962, the club crest was changed for the third time. It adopted a badge-like shape, divided vertically into two sections: the outer section displayed the club's name and the communist star, while the inner section featured a football and the club's founding year. After the Bosnian War ended in 1996, the crest was slightly modified. The communist star was replaced with a Bosnian fleur-de-lis, and the design, including the lettering font, was slightly stylized. This updated crest became one of the club's most recognizable trademarks in the following years. The adding of fleur-de-lis motifs to their crests was a common practice by Bosnian football clubs in the first few years after the war. The fleur-de-lis was eventually removed from the club crest in 2007, which today lacks any ideological or national symbols. Despite this, the club continues to embrace its visual heritage. Yugoslav-era crests are frequently featured on official merchandise and retro collections. The fleur-de-lis made a brief return in the 2013–14 season as part of the club’s third kit.

1946–1949

1949–1962

1962–1992

1995–2001

2001–2007

2007–present

== Stadium and training grounds ==
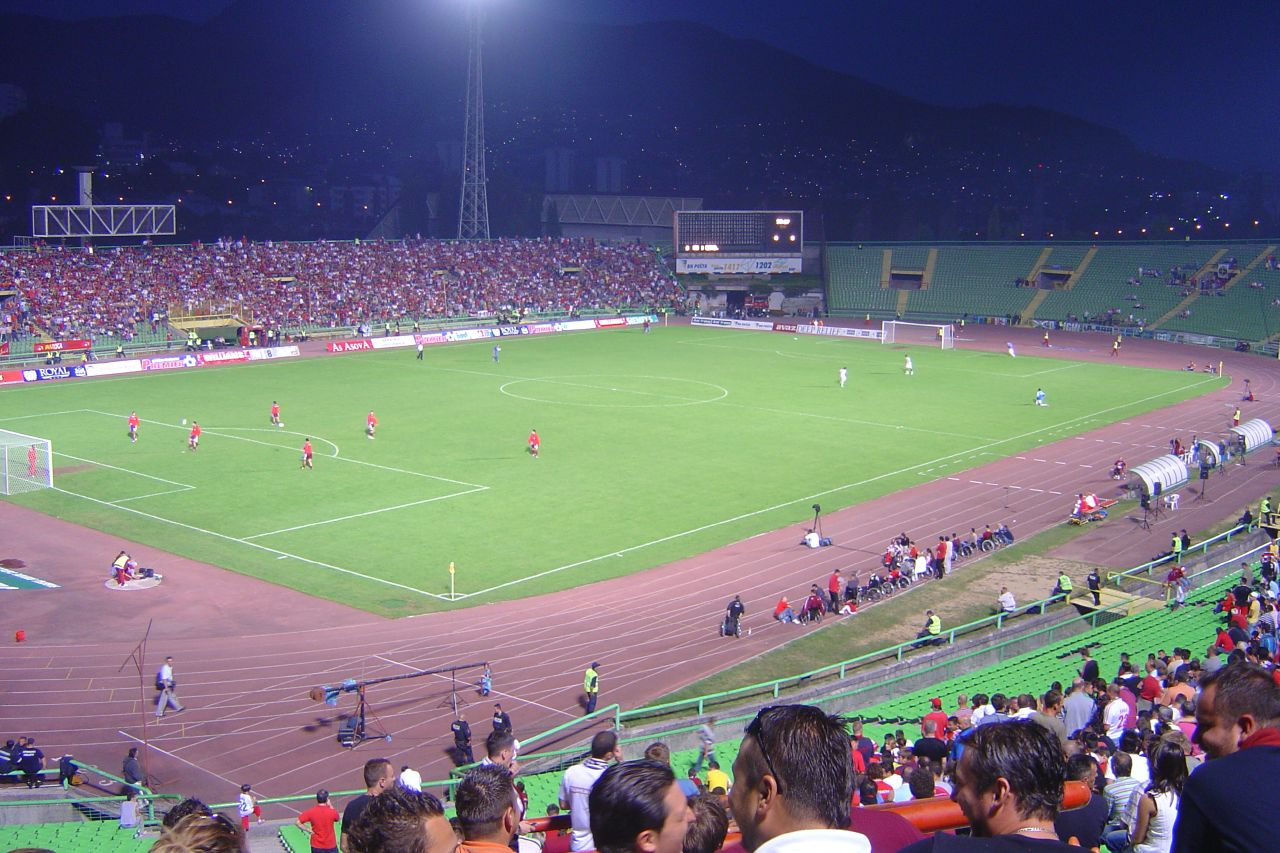
Koševo City Stadium, also known as the Asim Ferhatović - Hase Stadium

FK Sarajevo plays at the Asim Ferhatović Hase Stadium, formerly known as the Koševo Stadium. It is owned by the City of Sarajevo but is leased to the club on a long-term basis. The club runs and operates the stadium and has sole commercial and developmental rights to the Olympic complex until at least 2051, with the possibility of a further 15-year extension. The current seating capacity is 34,700. The stadium was opened in 1947 and named after the Sarajevo neighborhood of Koševo, where it is located. The stadium was literally buried into a local hill thus merging with its natural surroundings. In 1950 a pitch and a tartan track were also added. The first international football match at the stadium was played between Yugoslavia and Turkey, in 1954.

In 1966, the stadium hosted the Balkan Games and was again renovated for the occasion. A new administration building was built, as were new locker rooms and a restaurant. A modern scoreboard and new lighting were also provided. In 1984, the stadium was reconstructed for the 1984 Winter Olympics that were held in Sarajevo and is therefore often unofficially called The Olympic Stadium. On 7 February 1984, the Asim H. Ferhatović stadium hosted the opening ceremony of the games, and seated roughly 50,000. The West stand held 18,500 seating places at the time.

In 2004 the stadium's official name was changed to Asim H. Ferhatović, in memory of legendary FK Sarajevo striker Asim Ferhatović, who died after a heart attack in 1987. In 1998, three years after the end of the Bosnian War, the stadium was renovated for a fourth time. The seating capacity of the stadium was reduced to 34,500 and new seats were added. The ground has held matches for Sarajevo and their local rival Željezničar, including Europa League and Champions League fixtures. Furthermore, the stadium has hosted the national teams of Yugoslavia and Bosnia and Herzegovina on numerous occasions, as well as many notable athletic meetings.

Throughout its football history, the stadium welcomed some of Europe's finest clubs such as Manchester United, Real Madrid, Derby County, Inter Milan, Hamburger SV, Newcastle United, Celtic, Anderlecht, Borussia Mönchengladbach, Dynamo Kyiv, Basel, and others. Notable non-European clubs that have played Sarajevo on the stadium include the likes of Santos and Palmeiras.

The stadium's highest attendance was recorded in a 1981–82 league match between FK Sarajevo and their city rival FK Željezničar. Allegedly, roughly 60,000 people attended the game.

The club’s current training facility, the Butmir Training Centre, is located in the municipality of Ilidža, within the Sarajevo Canton. The complex was officially opened in October 2015 and covers an area of approximately 70,000 square meters (17 acres). Designed to meet modern training and infrastructure standards, the centre includes multiple natural grass and artificial turf pitches, indoor training halls, a gym, medical and physiotherapy facilities, player accommodation, a clinic, and administrative offices. It serves as the primary training ground for the club’s first team, as well as for its youth academy, B team and women’s team.

The main artificial turf pitch at the complex is named after Želimir Vidović, a former Sarajevo player who was killed during the Siege of Sarajevo in 1992 while assisting in the evacuation of wounded civilians. In recognition of his actions and legacy, a statue was erected near the pitch, located on the western grass embankment of the centre.

== Organization ==
=== Ownership and finances ===
FK Sarajevo is registered as a Private company limited by guarantee and corporate personhood that, unlike football clubs that are registered as limited companies, does not issue shares by which individuals or corporations can buy majority or minority ownership. Instead, the club's members act as guarantors by buying non-ownership-based management stakes in the form of contributions, earning in return management and voting rights. The guarantors give an undertaking to contribute a nominal amount in the event of the winding up of the company. It is often believed that such a company cannot distribute its profits to its members but, depending on the provisions of the articles, as is the case with FK Sarajevo, it very well may. Managing rights imply the right to form and control the club assembly, steering committee, and supervisory board, by which the largest contributor de iure takes full control of the club. Furthermore, the fact that the largest contributor may negotiate profit provisions between himself and the club opens the possibility for large-scale financial investment that exceeds charitable and non-profit contributions that are usually the cornerstone of companies limited by guarantee.

Malaysian billionaire, investor, and former chairman of Berjaya Group, Vincent Tan, was the club's majority contributor and thus its sole operator. After gaining control of the club in December 2013 by contributing US$2 million, Tan negotiated an agreement between himself and the club, by which he will invest an undisclosed sum while also running the operational finances and policies of the club, in return gaining the right to profit as would be the case of the club being a limited company. Furthermore, the formation of Public limited companies in the fields of real estate and tourism has been negotiated between the club and Tan, by which the companies will represent a joint venture by both parties, earning the club complete financial self-sustainability in the future. After taking control of the club, Vincent Tan dissolved the long-standing steering committee and supervisory board, opting to create a five-member board of directors for the day-to-day running of the club. He appointed two of his Malaysian business associates, Ken Choo i Lim Meng Kwong, members of the board alongside three local members. The club's annual operational expenditure and budget have been undisclosed since Tan gained control of the club. In September 2015 the club paid off the last of its public and private debt, thus becoming one of the rare debt-free clubs in eastern Europe.

In March 2019, it was announced that the ownership majority package was sold to Vietnamese businessman Nguyễn Hoài Nam and the PVF Investment and Trading, JSC (Promotion Fund of Vietnamese Football Talents F.C.).

In August 2021 Vincent Tan and Bosnian-American businessman Ismir Mirvić repurchased majority stakes from PVF Investment and Trading, JSC, with the former gaining 60% of club stakes and the prior gaining 30%. Mirvić, who was named club president, reestablished the club's supervisory board and formed a new, three-member board of directors. In September 2022, Tan and Mirvić renegotiated their majority stakes, each acquiring control of 49.13%. In December 2025, Mirvić acquired Tan's remaining shares to become the sole majority owner of the club.

==== Sponsorships ====
The club’s general sponsor is Turkish Airlines, with which it secured a lucrative four-year contract in 2015, widely regarded as the most profitable sponsorship deal in the history of Bosnian sports. In October 2025, FK Sarajevo and Turkish Airlines extended their collaboration for a fourth time by signing a new four-year sponsorship agreement. FK Sarajevo's kit has been manufactured by Adidas since 2023. FK Sarajevo also maintains partnerships with several other sponsors and official partners, including Tourism Malaysia, Courtyard by Marriott, Telemach, Meridianbet, Securitas, NLB Group, Mtel Bosnia and Herzegovina, Sarajevska pivara and others. As of 2024, the club has an official partnership with Visit Sarajevo and features its logo on the team’s kit.

=== Management ===
==== Board of directors ====
As of 29 September 2025

| Position | Nationality | Name |
|---|---|---|
| Chairman | (Bosnia and Herzegovina) (United States) | Ismir Mirvić |
| Member | (Bosnia and Herzegovina) | Nenad Podgorac |
| Member | (Bosnia and Herzegovina) | Adnan Hodžić |

==== Supervisory board ====
As of 19 September 2023

| Position | Nationality | Name |
|---|---|---|
| Chairman | (United States) | Raymond Cottman |
| Member | (Bosnia and Herzegovina) | Merisa Peco-Čukurija |
| Member | (Malaysia) | Syafiq Azman |

==== Club management ====
As of 11 November 2025

| Position | Nationality | Name |
|---|---|---|
| President | (Bosnia and Herzegovina) (United States) | Ismir Mirvić |
| President of Assembly | (Bosnia and Herzegovina) | Adnan Hadžimuratović |
| General director | (North Macedonia) | Krste Velkoski |
| Sporting director | (Croatia) | Zoran Mamić |
| General secretary | (Bosnia and Herzegovina) | Jasmila Hodžić |
| Adviser / counselor | (Croatia) | Zoran Mamić |
| Advisory commission chairman | (Bosnia and Herzegovina) | Mehmed Janjoš |
| Youth academy director | (Croatia) | Tomislav Gričar |
| Director of women's football | (Bosnia and Herzegovina) | Samira Hurem |
| Head of scouting | (Croatia) | Toni Bilandžić |
| Head of youth scouting | (Croatia) | Ivan Matić |
| Head of finances | (Bosnia and Herzegovina) | Merisa Peco Čukurija |
| Head of accounting | (Bosnia and Herzegovina) | Salko Ćimić |
| Chief legal officer | (Bosnia and Herzegovina) | Jasmila Hodžić |
| Head legal advisor | (Bosnia and Herzegovina) | Ajna Ključanin |
| Creative director | (United States) | Joe Peters |
| LBC project manager | (Bosnia and Herzegovina) | Maja Kurić |
| TMS manager | (Bosnia and Herzegovina) | Adnan Redžepagić |
| Marketing director | (Bosnia and Herzegovina) | Faruk Čengić |
| PR manager | (Bosnia and Herzegovina) | Denis Huseinbegović |
| Press officer | (Bosnia and Herzegovina) | Vedad Šurković |
| Head of content | (Bosnia and Herzegovina) | Azra Numanović |
| Head of retails | (Bosnia and Herzegovina) | Melisa Kovačević |
| Sales manager | (Bosnia and Herzegovina) | Adi Salčinović |
| Head of security | (Bosnia and Herzegovina) | Zlatan Čakal |

=== Social responsibility ===
Social responsibility and humanitarian efforts are fundamental values of Sarajevo, and the club is renowned for its commitment to these principles. It runs an aid and social programs foundation aimed at encouraging education and promoting healthy living among disadvantaged children, young people, and families. Furthermore, the club has been on the forefront of community development for years, donating large sums of money through its foundation to underdeveloped municipalities and school districts. The club organizes traditional blood donation conventions in its clinic every month while raising awareness for health issues that are impacting society. An annual arts competition is organized by the club in which primary school children in the Sarajevo Canton are asked to draw or paint a mascot for the team. The three best-ranked artists receive scholarships for afterschool arts and crafts programs. Women's rights are a key focus of the club's community and social development initiatives. In addition to sponsoring a shelter for battered women, the club offers free stadium entry to all female fans during the week of International Women's Day. Sarajevo has a long-standing partnership with the leading Bosnian charity agency "Pomozi.ba." Together, they collaborate on numerous projects across the country, with the club having promoted the agency on its kit from 2014 to 2018. The club is dedicated to the development of Srebrenica, awarding yearly scholarships to hundreds of children from the town and sponsoring the local multiethnic football team, FK Guber. Sarajevo was one of the eight core members of the 2nd Chance Group CIC-led project "Give Football A Chance", the others being Altınordu, Athletic Bilbao, Atromitos, Hammarby, Schalke 04, Sheffield United and Vitesse. The project's goal was the improvement of health and well-being of more than 5000 children living in conflict zones and implementing a comprehensive program of both formal and informal education for the children. In the aftermath of the 2014 Southeast Europe floods that devastated numerous towns in the country, FK Sarajevo was a major contributor to the massive relief effort. The club organized and sent volunteers to the stricken towns, and helped finance the rebuilding of homes both directly and through its foundation. The club's Malaysian owner Vincent Tan was also a major contributor to the relief effort, personally donating 250,000 BAM to hospitals in Maglaj and Doboj. In January 2016 Sarajevo hosted Syrian refugee children, in cooperation with UNICEF and the Red Cross. In October 2016 Sarajevo, together with Novi Pazar and Velež, organized a friendly match in Mostar. The profits from the match tickets went to a fund for Syrian refugees. The club employs war veterans from the Ilidža municipality in its training center. In October 2024, the club launched a breast cancer awareness campaign titled "FK Sarajevo For the Cure." For this event, the players donned uniforms not only in their signature maroon but with touches of pink as well. The team wore specially designed jerseys featuring the words "Fighter, Survivor, & Honor," aligning with the colors and symbols of the official campaign in collaboration with the organization "Think Pink."

In 2019 the club established the annuel Želimir Vidović Keli Award for humanitarian work.

== Honours ==
=== Domestic ===
| Type | Competition | Titles | Seasons |
|---|---|---|---|
| Domestic | First League/Premier League of Bosnia and Herzegovina | 5 | 1998–99, 2006–07, 2014–15, 2018–19, 2019–20 |
| Domestic | Yugoslav First League | 2 | 1966–67, 1984–85 |
| Domestic | Yugoslav Second League | 1 | 1948–49 |
| Domestic | Bosnia and Herzegovina Cup | 8 | 1996–97, 1997–98, 2001–02, 2004–05, 2013–14, 2018–19, 2020–21, 2024–25 |
| Domestic | Supercup of Bosnia and Herzegovina | 1 | 1997 |

- record

=== European ===
- European Cup / UEFA Champions League:
  - Round of 16 (1): 1967–68
- UEFA Cup / UEFA Europa League:
  - Round of 16 (1): 1982–83

=== Doubles ===
- Premier League and National Cup (1): 2018–19

== Players ==
=== Current squad ===
As of 27 August 2026

Note: Flags indicate national team as defined under FIFA eligibility rules; some limited exceptions apply. Players may hold more than one non-FIFA nationality.

| No. | Pos. | Nation | Player |
|---|---|---|---|
| 2 | DF | ZIM | Shane Maroodza |
| 3 | DF | BIH | Renato Gojković |
| 5 | MF | BIH | Rijad Telalović |
| 6 | DF | CAN | Jovan Ivanišević |
| 7 | FW | CRO | Ivan Šarić |
| 8 | MF | CRO | Antonio Galešić |
| 9 | FW | CRO | Leo Mikić |
| 11 | FW | GHA | Francis Kyeremeh |
| 13 | GK | BIH | Sanin Mušija |
| 17 | DF | SLO | Filip Kosi |
| 18 | DF | BIH | Matija Glogovac |
| 19 | FW | COL | Ricardo Caraballo |
| 19 | FW | SRB | Andreja Ristić |
| 20 | MF | MKD | Agon Elezi |
| 22 | DF | BIH | Amar Beganović (captain) |
| 23 | FW | DEN | Jonathan Agyekum |
| 24 | FW | CRO | Filip Živković (on loan from Osijek) |

| No. | Pos. | Nation | Player |
|---|---|---|---|
| 25 | FW | ESP | Junior Awusi |
| 27 | DF | CRO | Luka Hujber |
| 28 | GK | BIH | Haris Mujanić (on loan from Koper) |
| 29 | MF | BIH | Amar Cerić |
| 30 | DF | CRO | Luka Dajčer |
| 31 | GK | CRO | Ivan Banić |
| 35 | MF | UKR | Serhiy Ihnatkov |
| 38 | DF | CIV | Souleymane Méité |
| 40 | GK | BIH | Faris Mehić |
| 44 | DF | CRO | Petar Mišković |
| 59 | MF | BIH | Gojko Cimirot |
| 66 | MF | CYP | Rafail Mamas |
| 70 | DF | BIH | Selmir Pidro |
| 77 | DF | CRO | Mihael Kuprešak |
| 99 | FW | CRO | Bartol Barišić |
| — | FW | SEN | Albert Mendy |

=== Youth academy players ===
FK Sarajevo Academy players that received a first-team squad call-up.

| No. | Pos. | Nation | Player |
|---|---|---|---|
| 14 | MF | BIH | Vedad Leto |
| 16 | MF | BIH | Muhamed Dreca |
| 21 | FW | BIH | Anes H. Mehmedović |

| No. | Pos. | Nation | Player |
|---|---|---|---|
| 26 | DF | BIH | Daris Dizdarević |
| 45 | GK | BIH | Ibrahim Zahirović |
| 55 | MF | BIH | Kenan Vrban |

=== Out on loan ===
Note: Flags indicate national team as defined under FIFA eligibility rules; some limited exceptions apply. Players may hold more than one non-FIFA nationality.

| No. | Pos. | Nation | Player |
|---|---|---|---|
| — | DF | BIH | Nikola Đurić (at Zvijezda Gradačac until 31 December 2026) |
| — | MF | BIH | Haris Ališah (at Travnik until 31 December 2026) |
| — | MF | BIH | Ante Pokrajčić (at Hrvace until 30 June 2027) |

| No. | Pos. | Nation | Player |
|---|---|---|---|
| — | MF | BEL | Jack Senga (at Zvijezda Gradačac until 30 June 2027) |
| — | FW | POR | Gelson Rocha (at Leotar until 30 June 2027) |

=== Ismir Pintol trophy ===
The Ismir Pintol trophy (Bosnian: Trofej Ismir Pintol), is a trophy awarded to the most distinguished player in the past season and named after deceased FK Sarajevo fan Ismir Pintol. The winner of the trophy is decided by popular vote on the official website of the club's supporters and has been awarded since 2003. To be eligible to participate in the poll, a player must appear for the club in at least 10 official matches. The trophy was not awarded on six occasions because of fan dissatisfaction with team results. As of 2025, the only player to have won the trophy twice is Sedin Torlak.

Winners

Ismir Pintol Trophy Winners
| Season | Player |
|---|---|
| 2002–03 | (Bosnia and Herzegovina) Safet Nadarević |
| 2003–04 | Not awarded |
| 2004–05 | (Bosnia and Herzegovina) Džemal Berberović |
| 2005–06 | (Croatia) Matija Matko |
| 2006–07 | (Brazil) Marciano |
| 2007–08 | (Bosnia and Herzegovina) Semjon Milošević |
| 2008–09 | (Bosnia and Herzegovina) Damir Hadžić |
| 2009–10 | Not awarded |
| 2010–11 | (Bosnia and Herzegovina) Sedin Torlak |
| 2011–12 | Not awarded |
| 2012–13 | (Bosnia and Herzegovina) Sedin Torlak |
| 2014–15 | (Bosnia and Herzegovina) Samir Radovac |
| 2015–16 | (Croatia) Leon Benko |
| 2016–17 | (Bosnia and Herzegovina) Marko Mihojević |
| 2017–18 | Not awarded |
| 2018–19 | (Bosnia and Herzegovina) Nihad Mujakić |
| 2019–20 | (Bosnia and Herzegovina) Mersudin Ahmetović |
| 2020–21 | (Bosnia and Herzegovina) Amer Dupovac |
| 2021–22 | Not awarded |
| 2022–23 | Not awarded |
| 2023–24 | (Montenegro) Miomir Đuričković |
| 2024–25 | (Montenegro) Vladan Bubanja |
| 2025–26 | (North Macedonia) Agon Elezi |

=== Former players ===
For details of former players, see: List of FK Sarajevo players, and Category:FK Sarajevo players.

== Youth department and affiliates ==
The FK Sarajevo Youth Department (Bosnian: Omladinski pogon Fudbalskog kluba Sarajevo) is split into two sections. Namely, The Asim Ferhatović Hase School of Football (Bosnian: Škola fudbala Asim Ferhatović Hase), named after legendary striker Asim Ferhatović, and the FK Sarajevo Academy (Bosnian: Akademija Fudbalskog kluba Sarajevo). The former functions as both a general model for the popularization of the sport and as a filtering mechanism, used to pick out locally based footballing talents which are later transferred to the academy. The academy, a premier boarding school, attracts the top talents from Bosnia and Herzegovina and manages the club's competitive youth selections. Established in the 1950s, it has historically been recognized as one of the best youth systems in the former Yugoslavia. FK Sarajevo's youth teams train at two locations: the training facilities adjacent to Koševo Stadium and the elite Butmir Training Centre, which is currently undergoing expansion as of June 2024.

== Technical staff ==
As of 9 June 2026, the staff includes:

Current Staff
| Position | Name |
|---|---|
| Manager | (Croatia) Zoran Zekić |
| Assistant coach | (Croatia) Želimir Mešnjak |
| Assistant coach | (Croatia) Luka Šarlija |
| Goalkeeping coach | (Bosnia and Herzegovina) Adi Adilović |
| Goalkeeping coach | (Bosnia and Herzegovina) Domagoj Malovan |
| Fitness coach | (Croatia) Marko Matijević |
| Fitness coach | (Bosnia and Herzegovina) Evelin Pipo |
| Fitness coach | (Bosnia and Herzegovina) Emir Muratović |
| Video analyst | (Bosnia and Herzegovina) Admir Kozlić |
| Medical team coordinator | (Bosnia and Herzegovina) Dr. Reuf Karabeg |
| Doctor | (Bosnia and Herzegovina) Dr. Arman Pindžo |
| Doctor | (Bosnia and Herzegovina) Dr. Benjamin Kaknjašević |
| Senior Physiotherapist | (Bosnia and Herzegovina) Ismar Hadžibajrić |
| Physiotherapist | (Bosnia and Herzegovina) Mirza Marevac |
| Physiotherapist | (Bosnia and Herzegovina) Eldin Jarović |
| Physiotherapist | (Bosnia and Herzegovina) Enes Beganović |
| Technical team manager | (Bosnia and Herzegovina) Mustafa Beridan |
| Equipment manager | (Bosnia and Herzegovina) Nermin Huskić |
| Equipment manager | (Bosnia and Herzegovina) Alen Ramović |

== Historical ==
=== Presidents ===
Below is a list of FK Sarajevo presidents from 1946 until the present day.

| Name | Years |
|---|---|
| (Socialist Federal Republic of Yugoslavia) Safet Džinović | 1946–1947 |
| (Socialist Federal Republic of Yugoslavia) Branko Todić | 1948–1949 |
| (Socialist Federal Republic of Yugoslavia) Miloš Samardžić | 1949–1950 |
| (Socialist Federal Republic of Yugoslavia) Boško Baškot | 1950–1951 |
| (Socialist Federal Republic of Yugoslavia) Miloš Samardžić | 1952–1953 |
| (Socialist Federal Republic of Yugoslavia) Boško Baškot | 1953–1954 |
| (Socialist Federal Republic of Yugoslavia) Slobodan Kezunović | 1955–1956 |
| (Socialist Federal Republic of Yugoslavia) Vaso Radić | 1957–1959 |
| (Socialist Federal Republic of Yugoslavia) Šemso Kapetanović | 1959–1961 |
| (Socialist Federal Republic of Yugoslavia) Ljubo Kojo | 1962–1963 |
| (Socialist Federal Republic of Yugoslavia) Mile Perković | 1964–1967 |
| (Socialist Federal Republic of Yugoslavia) Milivoje Šteković | 1967–1968 |
| (Socialist Federal Republic of Yugoslavia) Osman Maglajlić | 1969–1970 |
| (Socialist Federal Republic of Yugoslavia) Izet Buševac | 1970–1971 |

| Name | Years |
|---|---|
| (Socialist Federal Republic of Yugoslavia) Vaso Radić | 1972–1973 |
| (Socialist Federal Republic of Yugoslavia) Mustafa Ajanović | 1973–1974 |
| (Socialist Federal Republic of Yugoslavia) Ljubomir Grupković | 1974–1981 |
| (Socialist Federal Republic of Yugoslavia) Duško Cvijetić | 1981–1983 |
| (Socialist Federal Republic of Yugoslavia) Alija Alić | 1983–1984 |
| (Socialist Federal Republic of Yugoslavia) Mile Markić | 1985–1987 |
| (Socialist Federal Republic of Yugoslavia) Nedeljko Despotović | 1988 |
| (Socialist Federal Republic of Yugoslavia) Kemal Hujić | 1988–1992 |
| (Bosnia and Herzegovina) (Bosnia and Herzegovina) Muhamed Granov | 1992–1999 |
| (Bosnia and Herzegovina) Meho Obradović | 1999–2000 |
| (Bosnia and Herzegovina) Besim Mehmedić | 2000–2001 |
| (Bosnia and Herzegovina) Salih Delalić | 2001–2002 |
| (Bosnia and Herzegovina) Muhamed Šaćiragić | 2002 |
| (Bosnia and Herzegovina) Faruk Hadžibegić | 2002–2004 |

| Name | Years |
|---|---|
| (Bosnia and Herzegovina) Nijaz Gracić | 2004–2005 |
| (Bosnia and Herzegovina) Savo Vlaški | 2005 |
| (Bosnia and Herzegovina) Hajrudin Šuman | 2005–2010 |
| (Bosnia and Herzegovina) Nijaz Merdanović | 2010 |
| (Bosnia and Herzegovina) Zijad Blekić | 2010 |
| (Bosnia and Herzegovina) Amir Rizvanović | 2010–2012 |
| (Bosnia and Herzegovina) Alen Hujić | 2013–2014 |
| (Bosnia and Herzegovina) Edis Kusturica | 2014–2016 |
| (North Macedonia) (Germany) Valentin Ilievski | 2016–2019 |
| (Bosnia and Herzegovina) Senad Jahić | 2019–2021 |
| (Bosnia and Herzegovina) Damir Kasum | 2021 |
| (Bosnia and Herzegovina) (United States) Ismir Mirvić | 2021–present |

=== Managers ===
Below is a list of FK Sarajevo managers from 1946 until the present day.^{1}

| Name | Nationality | Years |
|---|---|---|
| Josip Bulat | (Socialist Federal Republic of Yugoslavia) | 1946–1947 |
| Slavko Zagorac | (Socialist Federal Republic of Yugoslavia) | 1947–1948 |
| Miroslav Brozović | (Socialist Federal Republic of Yugoslavia) | 1948–1952 |
| Slavko Zagorac | (Socialist Federal Republic of Yugoslavia) | 1952–1953 |
| Aleksandar Tomašević | (Socialist Federal Republic of Yugoslavia) | 1953 |
| Slavko Zagorac | (Socialist Federal Republic of Yugoslavia) | 1953 |
| Miroslav Brozović | (Socialist Federal Republic of Yugoslavia) | 1954–1956 |
| Slavko Zagorac | (Socialist Federal Republic of Yugoslavia) | 1956 |
| Aleksandar Tomašević | (Socialist Federal Republic of Yugoslavia) | 1956–1958 |
| László Fenyvesi | (Hungary) | 1958 |
| Vojin Božović | (Socialist Federal Republic of Yugoslavia) | 1958–1959 |
| Miroslav Brozović | (Socialist Federal Republic of Yugoslavia) | 1959–1961 |
| Ratomir Čabrić | (Socialist Federal Republic of Yugoslavia) | 1961–1963 |
| Abdulah Gegić | (Socialist Federal Republic of Yugoslavia) | 1963–1965 |
| Aleksandar Atanacković | (Socialist Federal Republic of Yugoslavia) | 1965–1966 |
| Miroslav Brozović | (Socialist Federal Republic of Yugoslavia) | 1966–1967 |
| Franjo Lovrić | (Socialist Federal Republic of Yugoslavia) | 1967 |
| Munib Saračević | (Socialist Federal Republic of Yugoslavia) | 1967–1969 |
| Miroslav Brozović | (Socialist Federal Republic of Yugoslavia) | 1969−1970 |
| Srboljub Markušević | (Socialist Federal Republic of Yugoslavia) | 1970–1971 |
| Abdulah Gegić | (Socialist Federal Republic of Yugoslavia) | 1971–1972 |
| Srboljub Markušević | (Socialist Federal Republic of Yugoslavia) | 1972–1973 |
| Svetozar Vujović | (Socialist Federal Republic of Yugoslavia) | 1973–1974 |
| Mirsad Fazlagić | (Socialist Federal Republic of Yugoslavia) | 1974–1975 |
| Vukašin Višnjevac | (Socialist Federal Republic of Yugoslavia) | 1975–1977 |
| Fuad Muzurović | (Socialist Federal Republic of Yugoslavia) | 1977–1981 |
| Srboljub Markušević | (Socialist Federal Republic of Yugoslavia) | 1981–1983 |
| Boško Antić | (Socialist Federal Republic of Yugoslavia) | 1983–1986 |
| Denijal Pirić | (Socialist Federal Republic of Yugoslavia) | 1986–1988 |
| Džemaludin Mušović | (Socialist Federal Republic of Yugoslavia) | 1988–1990 |
| Rajko Rašević | (Socialist Federal Republic of Yugoslavia) | 1990 |
| Srboljub Markušević | (Socialist Federal Republic of Yugoslavia) | 1990 |
| Fuad Muzurović | (Socialist Federal Republic of Yugoslavia) (Bosnia and Herzegovina) | 1990–1995 |
| Denijal Pirić | (Bosnia and Herzegovina) | 1995–1996 |
| Nermin Hadžiahmetović | (Bosnia and Herzegovina) | 1996–1997 |
| Mehmed Janjoš | (Bosnia and Herzegovina) | 1997–1998 |
| Nermin Hadžiahmetović | (Bosnia and Herzegovina) | 1998–1999 |
| Sead Jesenković | (Bosnia and Herzegovina) | 1999 |
| Agim Nikolić | (Bosnia and Herzegovina) | 1999 |

| Name | Nationality | Years |
|---|---|---|
| Denijal Pirić | (Bosnia and Herzegovina) | 2000–2001 |
| Husref Musemić | (Bosnia and Herzegovina) | 2001 |
| Fuad Muzurović | (Bosnia and Herzegovina) | 2001–2002 |
| Husref Musemić | (Bosnia and Herzegovina) | 2002–2003 |
| Agim Nikolić | (Bosnia and Herzegovina) | 2003–2004 |
| Kemal Alispahić | (Bosnia and Herzegovina) | 2004 |
| Edin Prljača | (Bosnia and Herzegovina) | 2004 |
| Husref Musemić | (Bosnia and Herzegovina) | 2005–2008 |
| Šener Bajramović | (Bosnia and Herzegovina) | 2008 |
| Husnija Arapović | (Bosnia and Herzegovina) | 2008 |
| Mehmed Janjoš | (Bosnia and Herzegovina) | 2008–2010 |
| Mirza Varešanović | (Bosnia and Herzegovina) | 2010–2011 |
| Jiří Plíšek | (Czech Republic) | 2011 |
| Dragan Jović | (Bosnia and Herzegovina) | 2012–2013 |
| Husref Musemić | (Bosnia and Herzegovina) | 2013 |
| Abdulah Oruč (interim) | (Bosnia and Herzegovina) | 2013 |
| Robert Jarni | (Croatia) | 2013–2014 |
| Dženan Uščuplić | (Bosnia and Herzegovina) | 2014 |
| Meho Kodro | (Bosnia and Herzegovina) | 2014–2015 |
| Dženan Uščuplić | (Bosnia and Herzegovina) | 2015 |
| Almir Hurtić (interim) | (Bosnia and Herzegovina) | 2015 |
| Miodrag Ješić | (Serbia) | 2015–2016 |
| Almir Hurtić | (Bosnia and Herzegovina) | 2016 |
| Mehmed Janjoš | (Bosnia and Herzegovina) | 2016–2017 |
| Senad Repuh | (Bosnia and Herzegovina) | 2017 |
| Husref Musemić | (Bosnia and Herzegovina) | 2017–2019 |
| Vinko Marinović | (Serbia) (Bosnia and Herzegovina) | 2019–2021 |
| Dženan Uščuplić (interim) | (Bosnia and Herzegovina) | 2021 |
| Goran Sablić | (Croatia) | 2021 |
| Aleksandar Vasoski | (North Macedonia) | 2022 |
| Dženan Uščuplić (interim) | (Bosnia and Herzegovina) | 2022 |
| Feđa Dudić | (Bosnia and Herzegovina) | 2022 |
| Emir Obuća (interim) | (Bosnia and Herzegovina) | 2022 |
| Mirza Varešanović | (Bosnia and Herzegovina) | 2022–2023 |
| Simon Rožman | (Slovenia) | 2023–2024 |
| Zoran Zekić | (Croatia) | 2024–2025 |
| Husref Musemić | (Bosnia and Herzegovina) | 2025 |
| Mario Cvitanović | (Croatia) | 2025–2026 |
| Zoran Zekić | (Croatia) | 2026– |

=== Technical/Sporting directors ===
Below is a list of FK Sarajevo Technical director, later Sporting directors and their respective tenures.

| Name | Years |
|---|---|
| Svetozar Vujović (director) | 1974 – 1992 |
| Mirza Varešanović | 11 August 2004 – 30 June 2006 |
| Senad Merdanović | 24 August 2006 – 29 December 2010 |
| Edin Hadžialagić | 19 January 2011 – 17 February 2012 |
| Abdulah Ibraković | 26 August 2013 – 23 September 2015 |
| Faruk Ihtijarević | 16 August 2016 – 24 May 2018 |
| Emir Hadžić | 24 May 2018 – 18 April 2021; 23 May 2022 – 23 November 2022 |
| Senijad Ibričić | 3 August 2023 – 3 June 2024 |

=== Memorials ===
Memorials established by the club

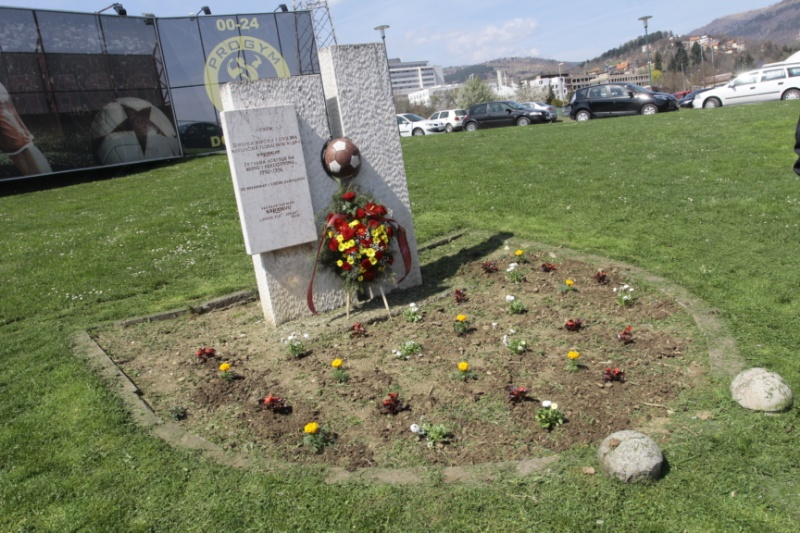
Memorial on the north side of the Koševo Stadium

- Horde zla

The club raised a memorial outside of the north stand of the Asim Ferhatović Hase Stadium which bears tribute to hundreds of members of the club's ultras group, Horde zla, killed in the defense of the city during the Siege of Sarajevo.

- Svetozar Vujović

Svetozar Vujović played for the club from 1959 to 1972, serving as a key figure in the 1967 championship-winning team. After his playing career, he briefly managed the club for one season before assuming the role of club director, a position he held for more than two decades. When the Siege of Sarajevo began in 1992, Vujović chose to remain in the city, turning down numerous offers of refuge. After his passing on January 16, 1993, FK Sarajevo honored him by naming the club’s main ceremonial lounge in its downtown administrative facility "The Svetozar Vujović Salon."

- Asim Ferhatović

Asim Ferhatović, a legendary forward for the club, scored 66 goals in 174 league appearances, making him the club’s all-time leading scorer in official competitions. Widely regarded as one of the greatest players to don the maroon-white jersey, Ferhatović’s legacy lives on through the Koševo Stadium, which bears his name following his death in 1987. Additionally, the club’s School of Football, a key part of its youth program, is named in his honor.

- Želimir Vidović

Želimir Vidović was a standout player for the club in the 1970s and early 1980s. On May 17, 1992, during the Siege of Sarajevo, Vidović participated in an operation to transport wounded civilians to a hospital in the Dobrinja neighborhood. The convoy was intercepted by Serb forces, and Vidović was executed, with his remains later discovered in a mass grave. Since 2004, an annual tournament has been held in his honor, and the main pitch at the Butmir Training Centre is named after him. A statue of Vidović stands on the western grass knoll surrounding the field.

- Ismir Pintol

Ismir Pintol, a 6-year-old FK Sarajevo supporter, died on June 29, 2002, after a long battle with leukemia. In his memory, the club, in partnership with Horde zla, established the Ismir Pintol trophy ("Trofej Ismir Pintol"), awarded to the standout player of the previous season. This tradition began in the 2002–03 season. To honor Ismir, fans remain seated in silence for the first six minutes of the final home game each season. The trophy is presented before kick-off at the base of the north stand.

- Vedran Puljić

Vedran Puljić, a 24-year-old member of FK Sarajevo’s ultras group, Horde zla, was tragically killed by a single gunshot during the notorious Široki Brijeg football riots on October 4, 2009. The shot that took Puljić’s life was reportedly fired by a local police officer, Oliver Knezović, who was arrested shortly after but never prosecuted. On May 23, 2013, the curva at the north stand of Koševo Stadium, the traditional gathering spot for Horde zla, was named in Puljić’s honor. Each year, the club holds a vigil at his gravesite to mark the anniversary of his death.

=== Notes ===
1 Includes Caretaker managers

== Club records and statistics ==
FK Sarajevo, under the name Torpedo, played its first match on 3 November 1946 against Bratstvo Travnik, winning 6–0. The club's first Yugoslav First League tie was a 2–2 draw against Ponziana Trieste on 25 August 1947. The maroon whites played their first official European match on 18 July 1960 in the Mitropa Cup, losing 2–4 to MTK Budapest. FK Sarajevo's record-holder for the number of club appearances is Ibrahim Biogradlić. He played 646 games for the maroon-whites between 1951 and 1967. The goal-scoring record-holder is striker Dobrivoje Živkov who scored 212 goals in both official and unofficial matches for the club. The goal-scoring record-holder in official matches is legendary striker Asim Ferhatović, who found the back of the net on 100 occasions in all official competitions, including 98 league goals (198 in total). Over 50 FK Sarajevo players were capped for the Yugoslav and Bosnian national teams. Former FK Sarajevo defender Faruk Hadžibegić is the third most capped player in the history of the Yugoslavia national team with 65 caps. He captained The Blues at the 1990 FIFA World Cup. Former FK Sarajevo defender Mirsad Fazlagić captained Yugoslavia at UEFA Euro 1968 and was named part of the all-tournament team. Former FK Sarajevo midfielder Elvir Baljić would break Real Madrid's transfer record in a 1999 move from Fenerbahçe. The Galacticos paid a transfer fee of €26 million for the Bosnian. Former FK Sarajevo player Safet Sušić would be named Bosnia and Herzegovina's UEFA Golden Jubilee inductee in 2004. Six of the fifteen former Bosnia and Herzegovina national team managers are former FK Sarajevo players: Fuad Muzurović, Džemaludin Mušović, Faruk Hadžibegić, Denijel Pirić, Miroslav Blažević and Safet Sušić. FK Sarajevo was the most successful club from Bosnia and Herzegovina in the Yugoslav First League, winning two titles and finishing runners-up on two other occasions. The club is ranked 6th in that competition's All-time league table. FK Sarajevo is the record-holder for number of Bosnian Cup triumphs (8). The maroon-whites are second in the All-time table of the Premier League of Bosnia and Herzegovina, forty points more than Željezničar. They have won the national championship five times, finishing runners-up on seven occasions.

== European record ==
| Competition | Pld | W | D | L | GF | GA | GD |
|---|---|---|---|---|---|---|---|
| European Cup / Champions League | 18 | 5 | 2 | 11 | 24 | 26 | −2 |
| UEFA Cup / Europa League | 60 | 21 | 13 | 26 | 85 | 112 | −27 |
| Conference League | 12 | 2 | 5 | 5 | 10 | 18 | −8 |
| Total | 90 | 28 | 20 | 42 | 119 | 156 | −37 |

Last updated on 16 July 2026.
Pld = Matches played; W = Matches won; D = Matches drawn; L = Matches lost; GF = Goals for; GA = Goals against.

== Women's football ==
SFK 2000 players celebrating their victory in the Bosnian Women’s Cup, 21 May 2025

There are many types of champions. Some win the league just as a one-off. There are those who enjoy periods of sustained success as well as the relentless winners who establish a long-term stranglehold on the silverware in their country. The next level up is the peerless teams who sustain it for a decade or so. Finally, in an entire category of their own, we have SFK 2000 Sarajevo.

— Tom Garry, writing for The Guardian

FK Sarajevo also operates a women's football team, SFK 2000. The team has been affiliated with the men's team since 2015, following a merger agreement signed on July 4, after which the club adopted the FK Sarajevo crest and colors. The club was established in June 2000 as part of the Alija Miladin recreational society, subsequently affiliating with a now-defunct men's football team from Sarajevo's Otoka neighborhood. They play their home games in the domestic league at the Butmir Training Centre and European fixtures at Koševo Stadium. Since its inception, the club has become the dominant force in Bosnian women's football, securing 23 consecutive national titles, 22 consecutive national cups (22 doubles), and representing the country in European competitions. It is also the most decorated women's club in the former Yugoslavia. The club has participated in the UEFA Women's Cup from 2003 onwards but never reached the final rounds. In the 2009–10 UEFA Women's Champions League, when the competition was rebranded and reorganized, the side reached the round of 32, a feat repeated during the 2012–13 season. The side's best UEFA women's club ranking was 17th in August 2013. SFK 2000 players form the core of the Bosnia and Herzegovina women's national team, while the club's current managing director Samira Hurem, was the longstanding Bosnia & Herzegovina manager until 2024. On 29 August 2016 the club qualified for the Round of 32 in the Women's Champions League for a third time in its History. On 1 September 2016 the team drew WFC Rossiyanka of Russia in the round of 32. The club once again qualified for the round of 32, this time in the 2018–19 UEFA Women's Champions League season, but got eliminated by Chelsea F.C.. In UEFA Women’s Champions League play, SFK 2000 have maintained consistent participation since 2003. In total, they’ve reached the Round of 32 four times, notably in 2009–10, 2012–13, 2018–19, and most recently on 4 September 2024, when they dominated KÍ Klaksvík 3–0 in the Round 1 mini‐tournament in Sarajevo. In the subsequent fixture on 7 September 2024, they faced SL Benfica and were defeated 4–0.

Beyond their domestic and European success, SFK 2000 Sarajevo has garnered widespread recognition for its commitment to youth development and gender equality in sports. The club operates a comprehensive academy system that nurtures girls from an early age, providing them with professional coaching, access to elite facilities, and structured competition. Many of Bosnia's and Herzegovina’s top female footballers have risen through SFK’s ranks. The club also engages in outreach initiatives, often in collaboration with NGOs and international partners, promoting female participation in sport, especially in underserved communities. As such, SFK 2000 is not only the sporting pride of Sarajevo but also a symbol of resilience, inclusion, and empowerment. SFK 2000 operates a youth academy for girls from the ages of five to sixteen. The academy is one of the most renowned and export-oriented in Europe. Notable alumni include Inter Milan defender, Marija Milinković; Juventus defender, Gloria Slišković; Inter Milan forward, Maja Jelčić; Milan forward, Lidija Kuliš and Sporting defender, Melisa Hasanbegović.

As of 17 December 2024, SFK 2000 is ranked 30th in Europe.

== Supporters ==
Horde Zla on the north stand of the Koševo Stadium, 8 October 2023

FK Sarajevo is one of the two most popular clubs in Bosnia and Herzegovina, boasting a large fanbase across the country, the Sandžak region of Serbia and Montenegro, and the Bosnian diaspora. This diaspora is especially prominent in Germany, Austria, Switzerland, Scandinavia, Canada, Australia, and the United States. The largest diaspora fan association is registered in Stuttgart, Germany.

From its establishment on 24 October 1946, FK Sarajevo quickly garnered a following in the city of Sarajevo. The banning of nearly all pre-war Sarajevan clubs by the new communist authorities left a significant vacuum in a city traditionally known as a footballing center in the Kingdom of Yugoslavia. The majority of fans came from the downtown neighborhoods of Baščaršija, Stari grad, and Centar, predominantly inhabited by Bosniaks. While other ethnicities supported the club in equal numbers, the history of organized support is nonetheless closely tied to these neighborhoods.

FK Sarajevo fans have been historically called Pitari while an individual was, and is still known as a Pitar. The nickname, meaning a consumer of the local Bosnian dish pita, was originally a derogatory label given by fans of working-class Željezničar that implied the pre-World War Two upper-class background of most FK Sarajevo supporters. This stemmed from the fact that the old downtown neighborhoods of the city were traditional centers of commerce and artisanship, even though the socioeconomic landscape had dramatically changed by the time the club was founded.

The organized supporters' group of Sarajevo, known as Horde zla (English: Hordes of Evil or Gang Evil), was formed in 1987 with the arrival of the Ultras subculture to Yugoslavia. The group is located on the north stand of the Asim Ferhatović Hase Stadium and has a decentralized organizational structure with many subgroups present at matches. The group's name was borrowed from a Zagor comic book at the time of its inception. Its logo features a stylized depiction of the Grim Reaper. Horde zla has gained notoriety over the decades for severe incidents of football violence. Horde zla have in the past garnered close relations with Dynamo Dresden ultras.

Another notable supporters' association and advocacy group is Maroon Friends 1946. This group attracts influential individuals from the financial, political, and cultural sectors of Bosnian society, aiming to lobby for the club both locally and internationally and influence club policies. The association is closely connected to the club's ultras, with many of its members having been part of Horde zla in their youth. The current chairman of Maroon Friends 1946 is Benjamin Isović, a prominent Bosnian singer-songwriter and poet.

== Rivalries ==
=== Sarajevo derby ===
Sarajevo fans at Grbavica Stadium, 9 May 2009

FK Sarajevo's biggest rivalry is with fellow Sarajevo club FK Željezničar. Meetings between these rivals are known as the Sarajevo derby or the Eternal derby (Bosnian: Vječiti derbi). The Sarajevo derby is particularly noted for the passion of both supporters groups. The stands of both teams feature fireworks, colored confetti, flags, rolls of paper, torches, smoke, drums, giant posters, and choreographies, used to create visual grandeur and apply psychological pressure on the visiting teams, hence the slogan, "Hellcome to Sarajevo". The roots of the rivalry can be traced back to the strong historical animosity between the capital's working class and bourgeoisie, wherein the former traditionally inhabited the more liberal, yet poorer suburban neighbourhoods and mainly supported FK Željezničar, while the latter resided in the traditional and wealthy, old and central parts of the city and represented the main fan-base of FK Sarajevo. Furthermore, since its formation, FK Sarajevo has always been closely tied to the political elites of Bosnia and Herzegovina, both in socialist Yugoslavia and since the country's independence, while FK Željezničar seldom had such influential support and has been considered a club of common folk, even though this notion can be disputed. Even though the rivalry between the two sides grew large from the very foundation of FK Sarajevo, the two teams only met in friendly fixtures for the better part of a decade because they competed in different levels of the Yugoslav football league system. The first official league match was held in 1954; FK Sarajevo won 6–1. This is still the biggest victory by any team in the Sarajevo derby.

As of October 2026, 161 Sarajevo derbies have been played, with 49 wins for FK Sarajevo, 49 for FK Željezničar, and 63 draws. Goal difference is 192:192.

=== Other rivalries ===
Sarajevo also shares a strong historic rivalry with Čelik Zenica, because of the close proximity of their two cities, and a relatively new rivalry with Široki Brijeg, which emerged following the Široki Brijeg riots. These riots resulted in the death of Sarajevo supporter Vedran Puljić and caused over thirty serious injuries, including four gunshot wounds. There are conflicting reports about who initiated the violence. Horde zla accused local residents and police of mistreatment during their journey to the match and upon entering the stadium. According to Horde zla's official statement, the incident was orchestrated by local politicians. They claim their buses were separated and parked far from the stadium, exposing them to stoning and attacks. They also assert that only 30 local policemen were initially present and did nothing to prevent the violence. Local police and residents said Horde zla members were the first to attack. According to local police officials, most of the regional police had earlier been sent to the nearby city of Mostar to prevent possible violence during a match between city rivals Zrinjski and Velež. The subsequent violence that followed resulted in Puljić's death. Since the riots, meetings of the two sides have carried an ominous atmosphere.

Sarajevo has also developed relatively new rivalries with Zrinjski Mostar and Borac Banja Luka, due to the fact that the three clubs have been the most successful in Bosnian football over the past decade. These rivalries are largely fueled by consistent title races, high-stakes matches, and growing animosity between supporter groups. As Sarajevo, Zrinjski, and Borac have dominated the domestic league in recent years, their encounters have taken on added significance, often serving as de facto title deciders.

== In popular culture ==
In the 2011 British sports drama Will directed by Ellen Perry and starring Damian Lewis, Perry Eggleton and Bob Hoskins, eleven-year-old Will Brennan and fictional former FK Sarajevo footballer Alek journey to see Liverpool play AC Milan in the 2005 Champions League Final at the Atatürk Olympic Stadium in Istanbul.

The music video for the song Everyday by American rock band Bon Jovi was partly filmed at the Koševo stadium and depicts the name FK Sarajevo.

In the hit 1982 Yugoslav comedy film A Tight Spot (Serbian: Tesna koža) directed by Mića Milošević and starring Nikola Simić, the main character Mita Pantić is seen listening to a radio broadcast of Sarajevo winning a Yugoslav First League fixture versus Sloboda.

The songs Nedelja kad je otiš'o Hase and Džana by Yugoslav and Bosnian punk rock band Zabranjeno Pušenje reference the club. The former is a song about a young boy heading to the Koševo stadium to watch a testimonial match against Osijek dedicated to club legend Asim Ferhatović, which is a direct metaphor for the death of Yugoslav president Josip Broz Tito. The latter is a song about a petty criminal being released from prison and finding love. The song contains the lyric: Na Koševo je išla da gledamo Saraj'vo (English: She headed to Koševo so we could watch Sarajevo).

Zabranjeno pušenje's a cappella poem Pamtim to kao da je bilo danas from their 1984 studio album Das ist Walter also references the club with the following verse: Pamtim to kao da je bilo danas kad je babo Atif otišao od nas, u ruci mu piva, za reverom značka FK Sarajeva (English: I remember it as if it were yesterday, when father Atif left us, beer in hand, FK Sarajevo badge on his lapel).

The hit song Kremen from the album Sredinom by Dino Merlin, one of the most prominent and commercially successful recording artists from the Former Yugoslavia, contains the lyric: Nedostaješ mi još više medena nego go vatrenom bordo navijaču (English: I miss you even more, honey, then an ardent maroon fan misses a goal).

Top lista nadrealista, a popular Yugoslav sketch comedy and variety television show from the 1980s and early 1990s, often referenced the club in its sketches.

In an episode of the popular Swedish thriller drama television series Caliphate, directed by Goran Kapetanović, one of the female characters is often seen wearing a Sarajevo jersey.

== Media ==
=== Bordo TV ===
Bordo TV is an encrypted streaming platform operated by FK Sarajevo, dedicated to content about the club. Initially launched in 2010 as an internet-based television channel in partnership with Moja TV, an IPTV provider under BH Telecom, it transitioned into an independent streaming service in 2018. The platform offers content in both Bosnian and English.

=== Bordo Fan ===
Bordo Fan is a monthly magazine distributed exclusively to FK Sarajevo membership cardholders. Launched in 2010 by Maroon Friends 1946 as a pocket-sized, independent fanzine, it later merged with the club's official quarterly newsletter, becoming the club's official publication. The magazine includes reports on the club's matches in the previous month, as well as information about the youth selections. Features often include interviews with players, both past and present, and the club's historic matches.

=== Sarajevo Podcast ===
Sarajevo Podcast is the club's official podcast, streamed on YouTube, Apple Music and Spotify.

== Relations ==
=== USD Bosna ===
Sarajevo maintains a close relationship with USD Bosna (English: University Sport Society Bosna; Bosnian: Univerzitetsko sportsko društvo Bosna), founded on 7 December 1947, to organize university student sports clubs in Sarajevo. USD Bosna was the largest sports society in the Socialist Republic of Bosnia and Herzegovina, with teams in 19 sports. Notable members include KK Bosna, which won the Euroleague Basketball title in 1979 and RK Bosna Sarajevo, which reached the 1/8 finals of the EHF Champions League in 2011. This relationship is rooted in their shared maroon and white club colours, leading KK Bosna to attract most of its fan base from FK Sarajevo during its rise in the mid and late 1970s. Over time, the two became colloquially interchangeable, with Sarajevo's organized ultras group, Horde Zla, supporting both teams, forming a so-called Maroon Family. Although RK Bosna was not a major player in Yugoslav handball, its post-war rise was strongly supported by Horde Zla.

On 29 August 2013, FK Sarajevo and RK Bosna Sarajevo signed a cooperation agreement to strengthen ties among the Maroon Family. A similar agreement was signed between Sarajevo and KK Bosna Visit Sarajevo on 6 November 2013, formalizing their forty-year relationship.

=== Affiliated clubs ===
- (Bosnia and Herzegovina) Radnik Hadžići (farm team)

== Kit and sponsorships ==
A view from one of the club's official stores on Ferhadija street

| Period | Supplier | Shirt sponsor |
|---|---|---|
| 1968 | | Alhos |
| 1968–1970 | | Hena |
| 1971 | | (Socialist Federal Republic of Yugoslavia) Osiguravajući Zavod Sarajevo |
| 1972 | None | (Socialist Federal Republic of Yugoslavia) Šipad |
| 1973–1974 | None | Ključ |
| 1973–1976 | | (Socialist Federal Republic of Yugoslavia) Feroelektro (Socialist Federal Republic of Yugoslavia) Energopetrol |
| 1976-1977 | (Germany) Adidas | Baza |
| 1977–1980 | (Socialist Federal Republic of Yugoslavia) YASSA | |
| 1980–1981 | (Germany) Puma | Vitex Visoko |
| 1981–1982 | (United Kingdom) (England) Playground | (Socialist Federal Republic of Yugoslavia) Privredna banka Sarajevo |
| 1982–1983 | | (Socialist Federal Republic of Yugoslavia) UNIS (Socialist Federal Republic of Yugoslavia) Pobjeda Tešanj |
| 1983–1984 | | Jutro |
| 1984–1985 | (United Kingdom) (England) Admiral | (Socialist Federal Republic of Yugoslavia) Alhos (Socialist Federal Republic of Yugoslavia) Energoinvest |
| 1985–1986 | (United Kingdom) (England) Admiral | (Socialist Federal Republic of Yugoslavia) Bosna Auto (Socialist Federal Republic of Yugoslavia) Kraš |
| 1986–1988 | (United Kingdom) (England) Admiral | (Socialist Federal Republic of Yugoslavia) JAT (Socialist Federal Republic of Yugoslavia) Gorenje |
| 1988–1989 | (Belgium) Patrick | (Socialist Federal Republic of Yugoslavia) Kraš (Japan) Nissan |
| 1989–1991 | (Germany) Uhlsport | (Germany) Volkswagen (Germany) Audi |
| 1992 | (Germany) Uhlsport | Cenex |
| 1993–1994 | None | Vemex |
| 1994–1995 | (Belgium) Patrick | (Belgium) Patrick |
| 1995–1996 | (Italy) Erreà | (Bosnia and Herzegovina) PTT BiH |
| 1996–1997 | (Belgium) Patrick | (Bosnia and Herzegovina) Sarajevo Tobacco Factory |
| 1997–2001 | (United Kingdom) (England) Umbro | (Bosnia and Herzegovina) Sarajevo Tobacco Factory |
| 2001–2003 | (Federal Republic of Yugoslavia) NAAI | (Bosnia and Herzegovina) Aura |
| 2003–2004 | (Italy) Lotto | (Bosnia and Herzegovina) Aura |
| 2004–2008 | (Italy) Legea | (Bosnia and Herzegovina) Aura |
| 2008–2010 | (United States) Nike | (Bosnia and Herzegovina) Aura |
| 2010–2011 | (Italy) Legea | (Bosnia and Herzegovina) Aura |
| 2011 | (Italy) Royal | (Bosnia and Herzegovina) Aura |
| 2011–2013 | (Turkey) Lescon | (Bosnia and Herzegovina) Aura |
| 2013–2015 | (Bosnia and Herzegovina) Haad | Visit Malaysia |
| 2015–2016 | (Bosnia and Herzegovina) Haad | (Turkey) Turkish Airlines |
| 2016–2021 | (United States) Nike | (Turkey) Turkish Airlines |
| 2021–2023 | (Italy) Erreà | (Turkey) Turkish Airlines |
| 2023– | (Germany) Adidas | (Turkey) Turkish Airlines |

== Awards ==
- Order of the Republic with Silver Wreath, 1968
