= Šener Bajramović =

Bosnian footballer and manager

Personal information
- Date of birth: September 12, 1950 (age 76)
- Place of birth: Sarajevo, FPR Yugoslavia
- Position: Midfielder

Senior career*
Years	Team	Apps	(Gls)
1972–1975	Željezničar		
1975–1984	Bosna Sarajevo		

Managerial career
- Tikvesh
- 1998–2001: Bosnia and Herzegovina U21
- 2005–2006: Sloga Jugomagnat
- 2008: FK Sarajevo
- 2009: Orašje
- 2011: Jedinstvo Bihać
- 2014: Iskra Bugojno
- 2015: Goražde
- * Club domestic league appearances and goals

Šener Bajramović (born 12 September 1950) is a retired Bosnian football player and manager.
