= Almir Hurtić =

Bosnian footballer and manager (born 1971)

Personal information
- Date of birth: 28 September 1971 (age 55)
- Place of birth: Doboj, SFR Yugoslavia
- Position: Goalkeeper

Senior career*
Years	Team	Apps	(Gls)
1996–1997	Željezničar	13	(0)
1997–2001	Sarajevo	13	(1)
Total		26	(1)

Managerial career
- 2009–2010: Mughan
- 2015: Sarajevo (caretaker)
- 2016: Sarajevo
- * Club domestic league appearances and goals

Almir Hurtić (born 28 September 1971) is a Bosnian professional football manager and former player who was most recently manager of Bosnian Premier League club Sarajevo.

Before Sarajevo, he also managed Azerbaijan Premier League club Mughan from 2009 to 2010.

== Honours ==
=== Player ===
Sarajevo

- Bosnian First League: 1998–99
- Bosnian Cup: 1997–98
- Bosnian Supercup: 1997
