= Husnija Arapović =

Bosnian football player and manager (1944–2022)

Husnija Arapović Behram
Personal information
- Date of birth: 7 August 1944
- Place of birth: Bosanska Dubica, Independent State of Croatia
- Date of death: 25 October 2022 (aged 78)
- Place of death: Zenica, Bosnia and Herzegovina
- Position: Midfielder

Youth career
- 1951–1958: Čelik Zenica

Senior career*
Years	Team	Apps	(Gls)
1958–1967	Čelik Zenica	224	(36)
1967–1970	Borac Banja Luka	86	(16)
1970–1973	St. Gallen	43	(6)
1973–1976	Winterthur	39	(5)
Total		392	(63)

Managerial career
- 1980–1984: Schaffhausen
- 1986–1987: Rudar Kakanj
- 1997: Bosnia and Herzegovina U18
- 1997–2002: Bosnia and Herzegovina B
- 1998–1999: Čelik Zenica
- 2004: Čelik Zenica
- 2003–2005: Velež Mostar
- 2008: Sarajevo
- 2011–2012: Rudar Zenica
- 2012: Travnik
- 2013–2014: Travnik
- 2014: Vitez
- 2014–2015: Travnik
- 2017: Travnik
- * Club domestic league appearances and goals

Husnija Arapović (7 August 1944 – 25 October 2022) was a Bosnian professional player and football manager.

== Career ==
He was the sporting director of Bosnian club Čelik Zenica, where he has also played and managed.

== Death ==
Arapović died on 25 October 2022, at the age of 78.

== Honours ==
=== Player ===
Čelik Zenica

- Yugoslav Second League: 1965–66 (West)

St. Gallen

- Nationalliga B: 1970–71
