= Josip Bulat (footballer, born 1905) =

Croatian and Yugoslav footballer and manager (1905–1970)

Personal information
- Date of birth: 11 April 1905
- Place of birth: Split, Kingdom of Dalmatia, Austria-Hungary
- Date of death: 22 April 1970 (aged 65)
- Place of death: Sarajevo, SR Bosnia and Herzegovina, SFR Yugoslavia
- Position: Midfielder

Youth career
- RNK Split

Senior career*
Years	Team	Apps	(Gls)
1938	Sloboda Tuzla		

Managerial career
- 1945–1946: Sloboda Tuzla
- 1946–1947: Sarajevo
- 1949: Željezničar
- * Club domestic league appearances and goals

Josip Bulat (11 April 1905 – 22 April 1970) was a Croatian and Yugoslav football manager and player.

== Career ==
Born in Split, Bulat played for Sloboda Tuzla in 1938. That year, the communists and their close associates in the club definitively dealt with the social democrats and their policies. During World War II, the Ustaše authorities banned the activities of Sloboda. The club resumed operations in March 1945. The renewed club began stringing together victories, and after a series of friendly matches, they were invited from Sarajevo to participate in a tournament under the name of Sloboda. The tournament was held on 10 and 11 May 1945, with selected teams from Sarajevo and Mostar also participating. Bulat was the manager of Sloboda, and under his expert guidance, the selected team from Tuzla defeated both competitors with a score of 2–0.

In 1946, Bulat was appointed manager of newly formed FK Sarajevo. He then went on to manage their city rivals Željezničar in the Yugoslav First League in 1949.

== Personal life and death ==
After retiring from football, Bulat lived in Sarajevo, where he worked as a notable sports administrator. He died at the age of 65 on 22 April 1970, and is buried at the Bare Cemetery in Sarajevo.
