= Edis Kusturica =

37th President of the Assembly of FK Sarajevo
- In office 18 January 2014 – 19 December 2016
- Preceded by: Alen Hujić
- Succeeded by: Valentin Ilievski

Personal details
- Born: 6 February 1953 (age 73) Sarajevo, Yugoslavia
- Profession: Entrepreneur and Lawyer

Edis Kusturica (born 6 February 1953) is a Bosnian entrepreneur, lawyer and former 37th president of the assembly of FK Sarajevo, taking charge of the club from his predecessor Alen Hujić.

Executive director of the Sarajevo-based Vakufska banka, he served on the board of FK Sarajevo since 2011, as well as being one of the authors of the club's new statute that was voted in during 2012, paving the way for Malaysian businessman and investor Vincent Tan to buy the club in December of the next year. Furthermore, he instigated the building of elite training facilities for the club in the Sarajevo suburb of Butmir, which are currently under construction as of May 2015. His cousin Feđa Kusturica, a high-ranking bank officer at Scotiabank and its vice president for the Asia-Pacific Region is also an FK Sarajevo board member.
