= YASSA =

Yugoslav company producing sports equipment

- Product type: Sportswear, clothing, footwear
- Produced by: Varaždinska industrija svile
- Country: Yugoslavia
- Introduced: 1961; 65 years ago
- Discontinued: 1990s
- Markets: Yugoslavia, Eastern Europe

YASSA was a sportswear and sports equipment brand from Yugoslavia.

The textile company Varaždinska industrija svile, based in Varaždin, SR Croatia, was first created in 1929. A new production facility was built in 1957, when the company was called Varaždinska industrija svile, konfekcije i kišobrana. With the YASSA brand (the acronym meant Serbo-Croatian: Jugoslavenski asortiman sportskih artikala; Serbo-Croatian Cyrillic: Југословенски асортиман спортских артикала; English: Yugoslav Assortment of Sport Articles) they became one the largest sportswear manufacturers in SFR Yugoslavia. After the breakup of Yugoslavia, the company lost a lot of its export markets and significantly scaled down production, and was renamed to Vis Konfekcija in 1995.

YASSA was the partner of Yugoslav participants during various Olympic Games, and its name appeared at numerous domestic and international sporting events such as: the Olympic Games in Montreal, Moscow, Lake Placid, Sarajevo, Seoul, and the Mediterranean Games in Split.

The company's logo and visual identity was created in 1974 by Boris Ljubičić, who became one of the most prominent Croatian graphics designers.

The Yassa brand was featured as one of the most recognizable Yugoslav brands in an art exhibition called Yugo.Logo, organized in 2023 in Zagreb by the Croatian Designer Society. After the 1984 Olympics, the design won an award from the Biennial of Design (BIO), organized by the Museum of Architecture and Design in Ljubljana.
