= Kemal Alispahić =

Bosnian footballer and manager (born 1965)

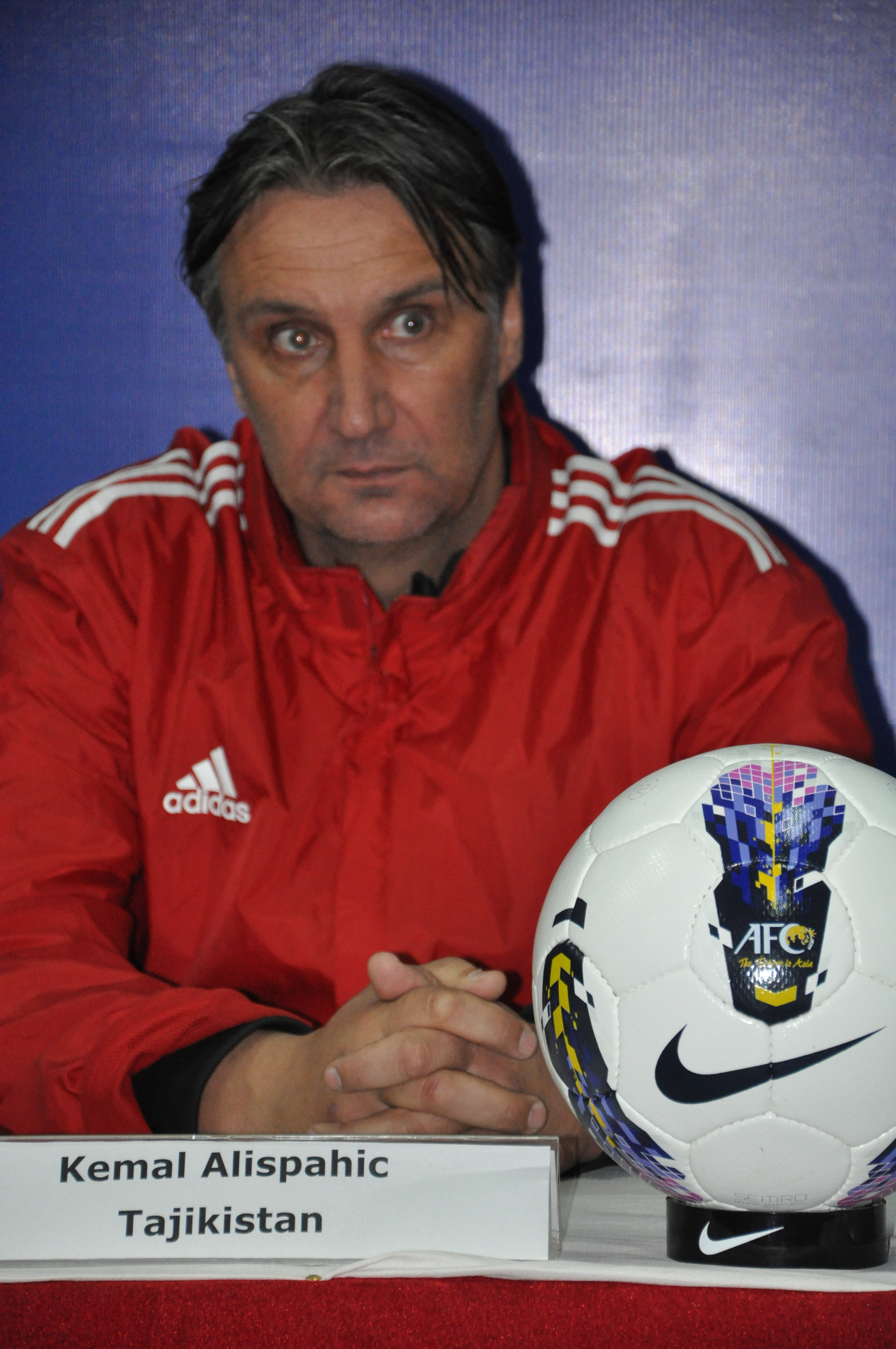
- Alispahić as head coach of Tajikistan in 2012

Personal information
- Date of birth: 13 March 1965 (age 61)
- Place of birth: Sarajevo, SFR Yugoslavia
- Position: Midfielder

Team information
- Current team: Al-Okhdood (technical director)

Youth career
- 1975–1982: Sarajevo

Senior career*
Years	Team	Apps	(Gls)
1983–1985	Iskra Bugojno		
1985–1986	Sarajevo	0	(0)
1986–1987	Željezničar	17	(0)
1987–1988	Sloboda Užice	32	(8)
1988–1989	Željezničar	9	(0)
1989–1990	MSV Duisburg	11	(2)
1991–1992	Remscheid	4	(0)
1993–1995	Kayserispor	37	(4)
1996	Lausanne-Sport	26	(8)

Managerial career
- 2001–2003: Željezničar (assistant)
- 2004: Sarajevo
- 2008–2009: Jedinstvo Bihać
- 2009: Mughan
- 2011: Al-Ittihad Aleppo
- 2012: Tajikistan
- 2012: Ravan Baku
- 2014–2015: Tajikistan U23
- 2016: Čelik Zenica
- 2017: Al-Ramtha
- 2018–2019: Al-Qaisumah
- * Club domestic league appearances and goals

Kemal Alispahić (born 13 March 1965) is a Bosnian professional football manager and former player. He is the current technical director of Saudi Pro League club Al-Okhdood.

== Playing career ==
As a player, Alispahić played for Iskra Bugojno, hometown clubs Sarajevo and Željezničar, Sloboda Užice, MSV Duisburg, Remscheid, Kayserispor and Lausanne-Sport. He was part of Iskra Bugojno's golden generation, when the club got promoted from the Yugoslav Second League to the First League in 1984 and also won the 1984–85 edition of the Mitropa Cup.

== Managerial career ==
In his managerial career, Alispahić first worked as an assistant manager to Amar Osim at Željezničar. He then went on to manage rivals Sarajevo, Jedinstvo Bihać, Mughan, Al-Ittihad Aleppo, Ravan Baku, Čelik Zenica,Jordanian Pro League club Al-Ramtha and most recently, Saudi Arabian side Al-Qaisumah. He also head coached the under-23 and senior Tajikistan national team,

Alispahić was most successful at Al-Ittihad Aleppo, winning the 2010–11 Syrian Cup.

== Honours ==
=== Player ===
Iskra Bugojno

- Yugoslav Second League: 1983–84 (West)
- Mitropa Cup: 1984–85

=== Manager ===
Al-Ittihad Aleppo

- Syrian Cup: 2010–11
