= Alen Hujić =

Bosnian lawyer

36th President of the Assembly of FK Sarajevo
- In office 27 February 2013 – 18 January 2014
- Preceded by: Amir Rizvanović
- Succeeded by: Edis Kusturica

Personal details
- Born: 11 May 1967 (age 59) Sarajevo, Yugoslavia
- Education: University of Sarajevo
- Profession: Lawyer

Alen Hujić (born 11 May 1967) is a prominent Bosnian lawyer who served as the 36th president of the assembly of Bosnian football club FK Sarajevo from 27 February 2013 until 18 January 2014. He is currently a member of the club's Board of Directors.
