= Munib Saračević =

Bosnian and Yugoslav football manager (1926–1988)

Personal information
- Date of birth: 11 June 1926
- Place of birth: Kulen Vakuf, Kingdom of Serbs, Croats and Slovenes
- Date of death: 15 February 1988 (aged 61)
- Place of death: Sarajevo, SFR Yugoslavia

Managerial career
- Years: Team
- 1961–1964: Famos Hrasnica
- 1964–1965: Željezničar
- 1967–1969: Sarajevo
- 1970: Budućnost
- 1970: Sloboda Tuzla
- 1974–1975: Sutjeska Nikšić

Munib Saračević (11 June 1926 – 15 February 1988) was a Bosnian and Yugoslav football manager. He spent his whole career managing teams in the Yugoslav football league system, of which all but one competed in the Yugoslav First League.
