= László Fenyvesi =

Hungarian footballer and manager

Personal information
- Full name: László Fenyvesi
- Date of birth: 2 May 1908
- Place of birth: Tolcsva, Austria-Hungary
- Date of death: 24 November 1993 (aged 85)
- Place of death: Újpest, Hungary
- Position: Striker

Senior career*
Years	Team	Apps	(Gls)
1929–1936	III. Kerületi TVE	139	(59)
1936–1939	Nemzeti SC	57	(19)

International career
1931–1934	Hungary	3	(0)

Managerial career
- 1945–1946: Szentlőrinci AC
- 1957–1958: Warta Poznań
- 1958: Sarajevo
- 1958–1959: Željezničar Sarajevo
- 1959: Kecskeméti Dózsa
- 1960–1961: Újpest
- * Club domestic league appearances and goals

László Fenyvesi (2 May 1908 – 24 November 1993) was a Hungarian footballer and manager that represented his country internationally.

== International career ==
Date	Venue	Opponent	Score
8 November 1931	Budapest	Sweden	3–1
2 July 1933	Stockholm	Sweden	2–5
14 January 1934	Frankfurt	Germany	1–3

== Coaching career ==
In summer 1958 he was appointed manager of FK Sarajevo and qualified the club to the Yugoslav First League. After being sacked a few months into the season, he took over their city rivals FK Željezničar whom he led until mid 1959.
