= Slavko Zagorac =

Bosnian Serb footballer and manager

Personal information
- Full name: Slavko Zagorac
- Date of birth: 30 April 1909
- Place of birth: Glamoč, Austria-Hungary
- Date of death: 14 February 1988 (aged 78)
- Place of death: Sarajevo, SFR Yugoslavia
- Position: Winger

Youth career
- SK Balkan
- SK Krajišnik

Senior career*
Years	Team	Apps	(Gls)
1926–1941	Slavija Sarajevo		

International career^{‡}
1932–1938	Yugoslavia	7	(0)

Managerial career
- 1947–1948: FK Sarajevo
- 1951: Željezničar
- 1952–1953: FK Sarajevo
- 1956: FK Sarajevo
- * Club domestic league appearances and goals as of 27 June 2015 ‡ National team caps and goals as of 24 March 2007

Slavko Zagorac (Serbian Cyrillic: Cлaвкo Зaгopaц; 30 April 1909 – 14 February 1988) was a Bosnian Serb football manager and player.

== Playing career ==
=== Club ===
Zagorac was born in Glamoč (at the time in Austria-Hungary) and started his career in 1924 with Banja Luka clubs SK Balkan and SK Krajišnik, before he moved to Slavija Sarajevo two years later. He played over 500 official matches with the club and was considered to be one of the best full-backs in the royal Yugoslavia. Many reports from that time are telling about his powerful shots and tackles. He played for Slavija until 1941 when, due to the beginning of the World War II, the championship was interrupted.

=== International ===
Zagorac made his debut for Yugoslavia in an April 1932 friendly match away against Spain and has earned a total of 7 caps, scoring no goals. He is the first player from a Bosnian club who played for the national team. His final international was a September 1938 Eduard Benes Cup match against Romania.

== Managerial career ==
After World War II, Zagorac continued his football career as a coach. He was a coach in both FK Sarajevo and Željezničar.

== Personal life ==
He lived in Sarajevo (at the time SR Bosnia and Herzegovina, SFR Yugoslavia), where he died at the age of 78.

== External sources ==
- Slavko Zagorac at National-Football-Teams.com
- Slavko Zagorac at Reprezentacija.rs (in Serbian)
