= List of FK Sarajevo players =

Fudbalski klub Sarajevo (Cyrillic: Фудбалски клуб Сарајево, IPA: [fûdbalskiː klûːb sɑɹəˈjeɪvəʊ]; English: Sarajevo Football Club) is a professional football club based in Sarajevo, the capital city of Bosnia and Herzegovina and is one of the most successful clubs in the country. This is a list of all the players that have played for the club since its foundation, in 1946.

Only players that have played at least one match in any of the following competitions: domestic league, domestic cup and European competitions, or been club members with contract.

Players that only played in friendlies, tournaments and that were on trial are not included.

== A ==
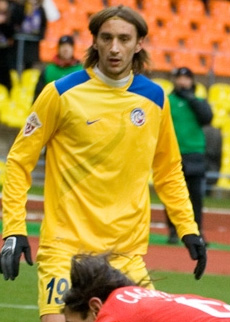
Mersudin Ahmetović, scored over 60 goals for Sarajevo.

- (Bosnia and Herzegovina) Almin Abdihodžić
- (Bosnia and Herzegovina) Samir Abdurahmanović
- (Ghana) Rashid Abubakar
- (Serbia) (Bosnia and Herzegovina) Edin Ademović
- (Bosnia and Herzegovina) Adi Adilović
- (Ghana) (Liberia) Joachim Adukor
- (Bosnia and Herzegovina) Almir Aganspahić
- (Denmark) (Ghana) Jonathan Nanaosei Agyekum
- (Bosnia and Herzegovina) Edmir Ahmetović
- (Bosnia and Herzegovina) Mersudin Ahmetović
- (Socialist Federal Republic of Yugoslavia) Rasim Ahmetović
- (Socialist Federal Republic of Yugoslavia) Anton Agošton
- (Bosnia and Herzegovina) Muhamed Alaim
- (Bosnia and Herzegovina) Mirzet Alagić
- (Socialist Federal Republic of Yugoslavia) Safet Alajbegović
- (Bosnia and Herzegovina) Elnes Alajmović
- (Bosnia and Herzegovina) Almir Alić
- (Bosnia and Herzegovina) (Bosnia and Herzegovina) Ismet Alić
- (Bosnia and Herzegovina) Emir Alihodžić
- (Socialist Federal Republic of Yugoslavia) Kemal Alispahić
- (Bosnia and Herzegovina) Mehmed Alispahić
- (Bosnia and Herzegovina) Haris Ališah
- (North Macedonia) Marjan Altiparmakovski
- (Socialist Federal Republic of Yugoslavia) Drago Ančić
- (Bosnia and Herzegovina) Nemanja Anđušić
- (Bosnia and Herzegovina) Marin Aničić
- (Socialist Federal Republic of Yugoslavia) Miloš Aničić
- (Socialist Federal Republic of Yugoslavia) Boško Antić
- (Bosnia and Herzegovina) Ensar Arifović
- (Socialist Federal Republic of Yugoslavia) Ivan Arih
- (Serbia) Branislav Arsenijević
- (Socialist Federal Republic of Yugoslavia) Zijad Arslanagić
- (Bosnia and Herzegovina) (Bosnia and Herzegovina) Alen Avdić
- (Socialist Federal Republic of Yugoslavia) Vahid Avdić
- (Bosnia and Herzegovina) Arben Avdija
- (North Macedonia) Daniel Avramovski
- (Spain) Junior Awusi
- (Socialist Federal Republic of Yugoslavia) Mladen Azinović

== B ==
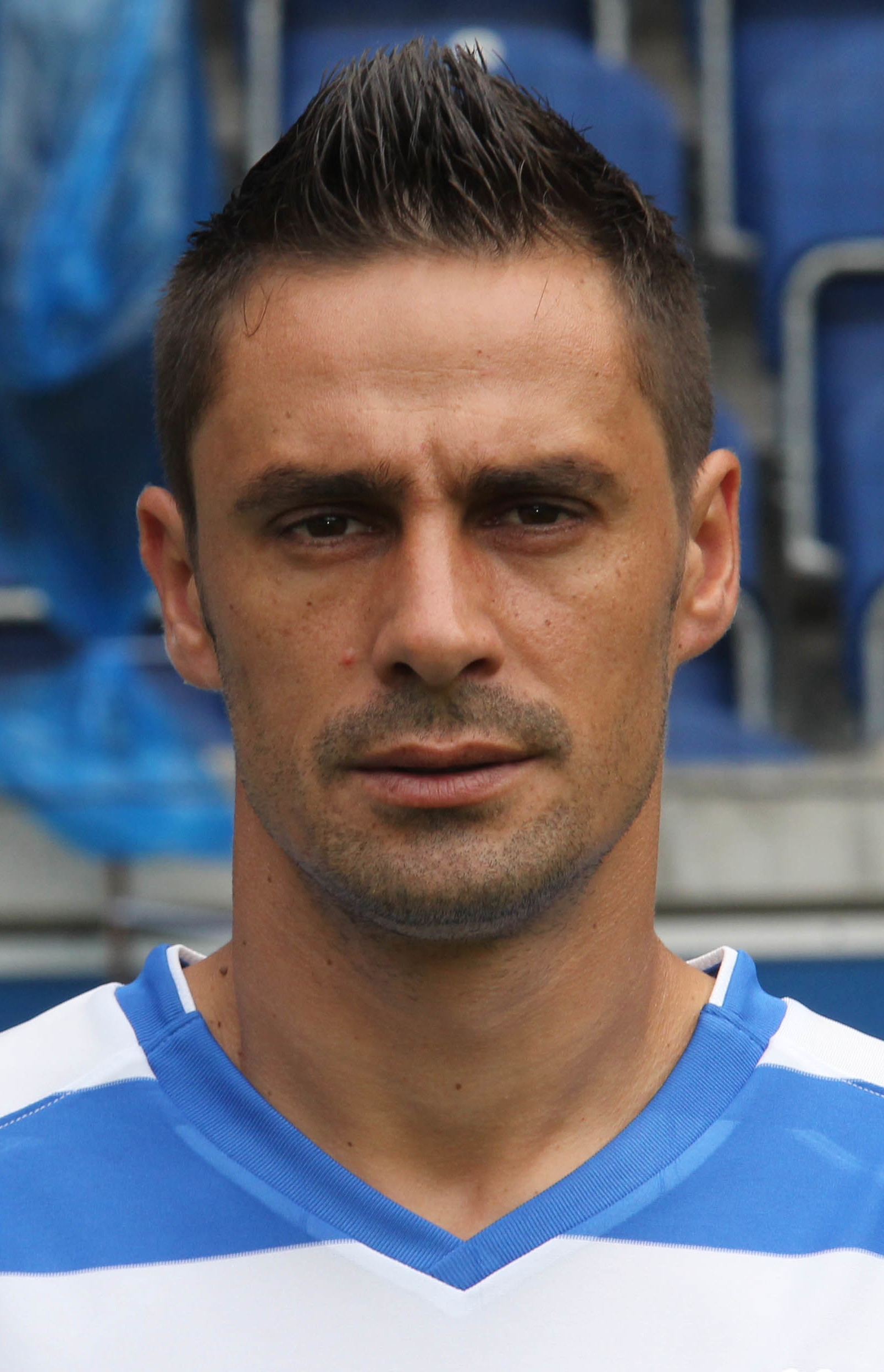
Džemal Berberović, former Bosnia and Herzegovina international.

- (Bosnia and Herzegovina) Miloš Babić
- (Bosnia and Herzegovina) Miodrag Babić
- (Croatia) Dražen Bagarić
- (Socialist Federal Republic of Yugoslavia) Milenko Bajić
- (Socialist Federal Republic of Yugoslavia) Srđan Bajić
- (Bosnia and Herzegovina) Saša Bajkuša
- (Bosnia and Herzegovina) Semir Bajraktarević
- (Bosnia and Herzegovina) Enin Bajramović
- (Socialist Federal Republic of Yugoslavia) Ismet Bajrić
- (Montenegro) Saša Balić
- (Bosnia and Herzegovina) Elvir Baljić
- (Bosnia and Herzegovina) Dejan Bandović
- (Croatia) Ivan Banić
- (Socialist Federal Republic of Yugoslavia) Petar Banjac
- (Croatia) Tomislav Barbarić
- (Croatia) Mario Barić
- (Croatia) Bartol Barišić
- (Socialist Federal Republic of Yugoslavia) Bernard Barnjak
- (Bosnia and Herzegovina) Alen Bašić
- (Socialist Federal Republic of Yugoslavia) Boro Beatović
- (Socialist Federal Republic of Yugoslavia) Radoslav Bebić
- (Bosnia and Herzegovina) Nedim Bečirević
- (Bosnia and Herzegovina) Elmir Behlulović
- (Bosnia and Herzegovina) (Bosnia and Herzegovina) Elvedin Beganović
- (Bosnia and Herzegovina) Damir Begić
- (Bosnia and Herzegovina) Senad Begić
- (Socialist Federal Republic of Yugoslavia) Midhad Beglerbegović
- (Bosnia and Herzegovina) Elmir Behlulović
- (Bosnia and Herzegovina) Almir Bekić
- (Bosnia and Herzegovina) Amer Bekić
- (Serbia) Zoran Belošević
- (Socialist Federal Republic of Yugoslavia) Davor Benčić
- (Croatia) Leon Benko
- (Bosnia and Herzegovina) Džemal Berberović
- (Socialist Federal Republic of Yugoslavia) Fuad Berberović
- (Bosnia and Herzegovina) Hamza Bešić
- (Bosnia and Herzegovina) Nermin Bijelonja
- (Bosnia and Herzegovina) Nemanja Bilbija
- (Socialist Federal Republic of Yugoslavia) Marco Bilić
- (Socialist Federal Republic of Yugoslavia) Ibrahim Biogradlić
- (Bosnia and Herzegovina) Dino Bišanović
- (Socialist Federal Republic of Yugoslavia) Skender Bišević
- (Socialist Federal Republic of Yugoslavia) Mile Bjelogrlić
- (Socialist Federal Republic of Yugoslavia) Drago Blagojević
- (Bosnia and Herzegovina) Zoran Blagojević
- (Socialist Federal Republic of Yugoslavia) Miroslav Blažević
- (Socialist Federal Republic of Yugoslavia) Stjepan Blažević
- (Austria) Darko Bodul
- (Bosnia and Herzegovina) Muhamed Bogilović
- (Socialist Federal Republic of Yugoslavia) Branko Bošnjak
- (Socialist Federal Republic of Yugoslavia) Tomislav Bošnjak
- (Brazil) Juninho Botelho
- (Socialist Federal Republic of Yugoslavia) Boban Božović
- (Socialist Federal Republic of Yugoslavia) Dragan Božović
- (Croatia) Slavko Bralić
- (Bosnia and Herzegovina) Elmedin Branković
- (Socialist Federal Republic of Yugoslavia) Tomo Braunović
- (Socialist Federal Republic of Yugoslavia) Vjekoslav Bremec
- (Socialist Federal Republic of Yugoslavia) Miroslav Brozović
- (Montenegro) Vladan Bubanja
- (Bosnia and Herzegovina) Sead Bučan
- (Socialist Federal Republic of Yugoslavia) Goran Bugarin
- (Socialist Federal Republic of Yugoslavia) Risto Bukvić
- (Bosnia and Herzegovina) Edin Bulbul
- (Socialist Federal Republic of Yugoslavia) Hajrudin Buljetović
- (Bosnia and Herzegovina) Muhamed Buljubašić
- (Bosnia and Herzegovina) Rusmir Burek
- (Croatia) Karlo Butić

== C ==
- (Colombia) Ricardo Caraballo
- (Brazil) João Carlos
- (Bosnia and Herzegovina) Amar Cerić
- (Socialist Federal Republic of Yugoslavia) Džemil Cerić
- (Socialist Federal Republic of Yugoslavia) Fadil Cerić
- (Bosnia and Herzegovina) Tarik Cerić
- (Brazil) Cezar Augusto
- (Sweden) Anomnachi Chinasa Chidi
- (Bosnia and Herzegovina) Gojko Cimirot
- (Montenegro) Boris Cmiljanić
- (Croatia) Ljuban Crepulja
- (Bosnia and Herzegovina) Nermin Crnkić
- (Socialist Federal Republic of Yugoslavia) Stojan Crnogorac
- (Brazil) Nathan da Cruz
- (Socialist Federal Republic of Yugoslavia) (Bosnia and Herzegovina) Rusmir Cviko

== Ć ==
- (Socialist Federal Republic of Yugoslavia) Emir Ćerić
- (Montenegro) Marko Ćetković
- (Socialist Federal Republic of Yugoslavia) Miodrag Ćirković
- (Bosnia and Herzegovina) (Bosnia and Herzegovina) Adnan Ćupina

== Č ==
- (Bosnia and Herzegovina) Vahidin Čahtarević
- (Socialist Federal Republic of Yugoslavia) Muhamed Čajić
- (Bosnia and Herzegovina) Edin Čakal
- (Bosnia and Herzegovina) Jasmin Čampara
- (Bosnia and Herzegovina) Anes Čardaklija
- (Socialist Federal Republic of Yugoslavia) Hajrudin Čardaklija
- (Bosnia and Herzegovina) Hamza Čataković
- (Bosnia and Herzegovina) Kenan Čehajić
- (Bosnia and Herzegovina) Nidal Čelik
- (Bosnia and Herzegovina) Aldin Čenan
- (Socialist Federal Republic of Yugoslavia) Nermin Čengić
- (Socialist Federal Republic of Yugoslavia) Nusret Čerkić
- (Bosnia and Herzegovina) Adis Čimić
- (Croatia) Frane Čirjak
- (Bosnia and Herzegovina) Fadil Čizmić
- (Bosnia and Herzegovina) Adin Čiva
- (Bosnia and Herzegovina) Semir Čomaga
- (Bosnia and Herzegovina) Denis Čomor
- (Socialist Federal Republic of Yugoslavia) Vladimir Čonč
- (Socialist Federal Republic of Yugoslavia) Muhidin Čoralić
- (Socialist Federal Republic of Yugoslavia) Midhat Čorbo
- (Bosnia and Herzegovina) Alija Čulov

== D ==
- (Croatia) Luka Dajčer
- (Bosnia and Herzegovina) Muamer Dalipagić
- (Socialist Federal Republic of Yugoslavia) Fahrija Dautbegović
- (Socialist Federal Republic of Yugoslavia) (Bosnia and Herzegovina) (Bosnia and Herzegovina) Mirsad Dedić
- (Croatia) Matej Delač
- (Socialist Federal Republic of Yugoslavia) Salih Delalić
- (Bosnia and Herzegovina) Alen Delić
- (Bosnia and Herzegovina) Kenan Dervišagić
- (Senegal) Secouba Diatta
- (Socialist Federal Republic of Yugoslavia) Sreten Dilberović
- (Bosnia and Herzegovina) Belmin Dizdarević
- (Bosnia and Herzegovina) Daris Dizdarević
- (Kosovo) Patrik Doçi
- (Serbia) Vojislav Dragović
- (Bosnia and Herzegovina) Muhamed Dreca
- (North Macedonia) Vlatko Drobarov
- (Bosnia and Herzegovina) Feđa Dudić
- (Socialist Federal Republic of Yugoslavia) Esad Dugalić
- (Bosnia and Herzegovina) Haris Duljević
- (Bosnia and Herzegovina) Amer Dupovac
- (Socialist Federal Republic of Yugoslavia) Zlatko Dupovac
- (Bosnia and Herzegovina) Elvir Duraković
- (Bosnia and Herzegovina) Samir Duro

== Đ ==
- (Serbia) (Bosnia and Herzegovina) Aladin Đakovac
- (Bosnia and Herzegovina) Jasmin Đidić
- (Bosnia and Herzegovina) Andrej Đokanović
- (Socialist Federal Republic of Yugoslavia) Milorad Đokić
- (Serbia) Aleksandar Đorđević
- (Socialist Federal Republic of Yugoslavia) Đorđe Đorđević
- (Socialist Federal Republic of Yugoslavia) Dušan Đurić
- (Bosnia and Herzegovina) Nikola Đurić
- (Socialist Federal Republic of Yugoslavia) Spiro Đurić
- (Montenegro) Miomir Đuričković
- (Socialist Federal Republic of Yugoslavia) Miloš Đurković

== Dž ==
- (Bosnia and Herzegovina) Adin Džafić
- (Bosnia and Herzegovina) Adnan Džafić
- (Slovenia) Elvis Džafić
- (Bosnia and Herzegovina) Muhamed Džakmić
- (Bosnia and Herzegovina) Armin Džanović
- (Bosnia and Herzegovina) Mensur Džaviti
- (Socialist Federal Republic of Yugoslavia) Kemal Džemidžić
- (Bosnia and Herzegovina) Džemal Džumhur

== E ==
- (Socialist Federal Republic of Yugoslavia) Savo Ekmečić
- (Socialist Federal Republic of Yugoslavia) Obren Ekmečić
- (North Macedonia) Agon Elezi
- (Bosnia and Herzegovina) Adnan Elezović
- (Bosnia and Herzegovina) Kemal Elkaz
- (Brazil) Emerson

== F ==
- (Socialist Federal Republic of Yugoslavia) Anton Falak
- (England) Matthias Fanimo
- (Socialist Federal Republic of Yugoslavia) Mirsad Fazlagić
- (Bosnia and Herzegovina) Nedžad Fazlagić
- (Socialist Federal Republic of Yugoslavia) Said Fazlagić
- (Bosnia and Herzegovina) Admir Fejzić
- (Bosnia and Herzegovina) Irfan Fejzić
- (Socialist Federal Republic of Yugoslavia) Sadik Fejzić
- (Socialist Federal Republic of Yugoslavia) Muriz Ferhatbegović
- (Bosnia and Herzegovina) Adin Ferhatović
- (Bosnia and Herzegovina) Amar Ferhatović
- (Socialist Federal Republic of Yugoslavia) Asim Ferhatović
- (Socialist Federal Republic of Yugoslavia) Hamid Ferhatović
- (Bosnia and Herzegovina) Nidal Ferhatović
- (Socialist Federal Republic of Yugoslavia) Nijaz Ferhatović
- (Socialist Federal Republic of Yugoslavia) Ibrahim Fizović
- (Bosnia and Herzegovina) Adnan Fočić
- (Socialist Federal Republic of Yugoslavia) Slobodan Franković

== G ==
- (Croatia) Antonio Galešić
- (Socialist Federal Republic of Yugoslavia) Ferid Ganić
- (Serbia) Nebojša Gavrić
- (Socialist Federal Republic of Yugoslavia) Nudžein Geca
- (Socialist Federal Republic of Yugoslavia) Abdulah Gegić
- (Socialist Federal Republic of Yugoslavia) Ivica Glavočević
- (Bosnia and Herzegovina) Vedad Gljiva
- (Bosnia and Herzegovina) Matija Glogovac
- (Socialist Federal Republic of Yugoslavia) Midhat Gluhačević
- (Bosnia and Herzegovina) (Bosnia and Herzegovina) Nermin Gogalić
- (Bosnia and Herzegovina) Renato Gojković
- (Socialist Federal Republic of Yugoslavia) Zlatko Golac
- (Socialist Federal Republic of Yugoslavia) Suad Golubić
- (Georgia (country)) Vasilios Gordeziani
- (Bosnia and Herzegovina) Emir Granov
- (Socialist Federal Republic of Yugoslavia) Sead Gruda
- (Bosnia and Herzegovina) Vladan Grujić
- (Bosnia and Herzegovina) Boris Gujić
- (Georgia (country)) Giorgi Guliashvili
- (Bosnia and Herzegovina) Muris Gurda
- (Montenegro) Hilmo Gutić
- (Bosnia and Herzegovina) Adnan Gušo
- (Socialist Federal Republic of Yugoslavia) Aleksandar Guzina
- (Bosnia and Herzegovina) Gedeon Guzina

== H ==
- (Socialist Federal Republic of Yugoslavia) Anton Habić
- (Socialist Federal Republic of Yugoslavia) Esher Hadžiabdić
- (Bosnia and Herzegovina) Ismet Hadžiahmetović
- (Socialist Federal Republic of Yugoslavia) Edin Hadžialagić
- (Socialist Federal Republic of Yugoslavia) Faruk Hadžibegić
- (Bosnia and Herzegovina) Damir Hadžić
- (Bosnia and Herzegovina) Emir Hadžić
- (Bosnia and Herzegovina) Nedim Hadžić
- (Bosnia and Herzegovina) Ajdin Hadžihasnović
- (Socialist Federal Republic of Yugoslavia) Mirzo Hadžihasanović
- (Socialist Federal Republic of Yugoslavia) Esad Hadžijusufović
- (Socialist Federal Republic of Yugoslavia) Faruk Hadžimešić
- (Bosnia and Herzegovina) (Bosnia and Herzegovina) Ahmed Hadžispahić
- (Socialist Federal Republic of Yugoslavia) Fuad Hajrović
- (Bosnia and Herzegovina) Emir Halilović
- (Socialist Federal Republic of Yugoslavia) Našid Halimić
- (Bosnia and Herzegovina) Dženaldin Hamzagić
- (Bosnia and Herzegovina) Dino Hamzić
- (Bosnia and Herzegovina) Muamer Hamzić
- (Bosnia and Herzegovina) Faris Handžić
- (Bosnia and Herzegovina) Haris Handžić
- (Socialist Federal Republic of Yugoslavia) Irfan Handžić
- (Bosnia and Herzegovina) Kenan Handžić
- (Socialist Federal Republic of Yugoslavia) Milan Harambašić
- (Bosnia and Herzegovina) Haris Harba
- (Socialist Federal Republic of Yugoslavia) Nedžad Hasanbegović
- (Bosnia and Herzegovina) Admir Hasančić
- (Bosnia and Herzegovina) Ahmed Hasanović
- (Bosnia and Herzegovina) Ajdin Hasić
- (Bosnia and Herzegovina) Haris Haskić
- (Bosnia and Herzegovina) Nermin Haskić
- (Bosnia and Herzegovina) Anes Haurdić
- (Bosnia and Herzegovina) Anel Hebibović
- (Bosnia and Herzegovina) Admir Herco
- (Bosnia and Herzegovina) Reuf Herco
- (Brazil) César Augusto Hermenegildo
- (Bosnia and Herzegovina) Elvedin Herić
- (Bosnia and Herzegovina) Nedim Hiroš
- (Socialist Federal Republic of Yugoslavia) Drago Hmelina
- (Serbia) (Bosnia and Herzegovina) Dušan Hodžić
- (Bosnia and Herzegovina) Faruk Hodžić
- (Bosnia and Herzegovina) Ibro Hodžić
- (Socialist Federal Republic of Yugoslavia) Kemo Hodžić
- (Socialist Federal Republic of Yugoslavia) Sead Hodžić
- (Bosnia and Herzegovina) Esad Hošić
- (Bosnia and Herzegovina) Dženan Hošić
- (Bosnia and Herzegovina) Almedin Hota
- (Bosnia and Herzegovina) Adnan Hrelja
- (Bosnia and Herzegovina) Armin Hrvat
- (Croatia) Luka Hujber
- (Bosnia and Herzegovina) Almir Hurtić
- (Bosnia and Herzegovina) Ermin Huseinbašić
- (Bosnia and Herzegovina) Said Husejinović
- (Bosnia and Herzegovina) Edin Husić

== I ==
- (Bosnia and Herzegovina) Ferid Idrizović
- (Bosnia and Herzegovina) (Ukraine) Sergej Ignatkov
- (Bosnia and Herzegovina) (Bosnia and Herzegovina) Faruk Ihtijarević
- (Socialist Federal Republic of Yugoslavia) Danilo Ijačić
- (Nigeria) Harmony Ikande
- (Croatia) Ivan Ikić
- (North Macedonia) Dejan Iliev
- (Bosnia and Herzegovina) Armin Imamović
- (Bosnia and Herzegovina) Elvis Imširović
- (Bosnia and Herzegovina) Dino Islamović
- (Canada) (Croatia) Jovan Ivanišević
- (Bosnia and Herzegovina) Perica Ivetić
- (Croatia) Marko Ivkić

== J ==
- (Socialist Federal Republic of Yugoslavia) Haris Jaganjac
- (North Macedonia) Adis Jahović
- (Croatia) (Bosnia and Herzegovina) Mato Jajalo
- (Socialist Federal Republic of Yugoslavia) Anto Jakovljević
- (Socialist Federal Republic of Yugoslavia) Davor Jakovljević
- (Socialist Federal Republic of Yugoslavia) Dragan Jakovljević
- (Bosnia and Herzegovina) Aldin Janjoš
- (Bosnia and Herzegovina) Almir Janjoš
- (Bosnia and Herzegovina) Emir Janjoš
- (Socialist Federal Republic of Yugoslavia) Mehmed Janjoš
- (Socialist Federal Republic of Yugoslavia) Slobodan Janjuš
- (Socialist Federal Republic of Yugoslavia) Dušan Jarkovački
- (Socialist Federal Republic of Yugoslavia) Čedomir Jaroš
- (Bosnia and Herzegovina) Amar Jašarević
- (The Gambia) Momodou Jatta
- (Croatia) Ivan Jelić Balta
- (Socialist Federal Republic of Yugoslavia) Sead Jesenković
- (Bosnia and Herzegovina) Dušan Jevtić
- (Socialist Federal Republic of Yugoslavia) Boris Jordanovski
- (Socialist Federal Republic of Yugoslavia) Dušan Jovanović
- (Socialist Federal Republic of Yugoslavia) Siniša Jovanović
- (Socialist Federal Republic of Yugoslavia) Srđan Jovanović
- (Bosnia and Herzegovina) Mihajlo Jovašević
- (Socialist Federal Republic of Yugoslavia) Vojislav Jovetić
- (Serbia) Bojan Jović
- (Serbia) Filip Jović
- (Socialist Federal Republic of Yugoslavia) Davor Jozić
- (Socialist Federal Republic of Yugoslavia) Ivica Jozić
- (Bosnia and Herzegovina) Ivan Jukić
- (Croatia) Edin Julardžija
- (Brazil) Juninho Botelho
- (Bosnia and Herzegovina) Bojan Jurić
- (Socialist Federal Republic of Yugoslavia) Goran Jurišić
- (Bosnia and Herzegovina) Nedim Jusufbegović
- (Socialist Federal Republic of Yugoslavia) Osman Jusufbegović
- (Socialist Federal Republic of Yugoslavia) Predrag Jušić

== K ==
- (Bosnia and Herzegovina) Amar Kadić
- (Bosnia and Herzegovina) Rusmir Kadrić
- (Bosnia and Herzegovina) Advan Kadušić
- (Syria) Ahmad Kalasi
- (Bosnia and Herzegovina) Izudin Kamberović
- (Socialist Federal Republic of Yugoslavia) Nail Kantardžić
- (Bosnia and Herzegovina) Adnan Kanurić
- (Bosnia and Herzegovina) Adi Kapetanović
- (Bosnia and Herzegovina) Adis Kapetanović
- (Socialist Federal Republic of Yugoslavia) Mirza Kapetanović
- (Socialist Federal Republic of Yugoslavia) Sead Kapetanović
- (Bosnia and Herzegovina) Tarik Kapetanović
- (Bosnia and Herzegovina) Rifet Kapić
- (Bosnia and Herzegovina) Fikret Kapo
- (Bosnia and Herzegovina) Haris Karadža
- (Socialist Federal Republic of Yugoslavia) Asim Karajica
- (Bosnia and Herzegovina) Vladimir Karalić
- (Serbia) Žarko Karamatić
- (Bosnia and Herzegovina) Adnan Karamehmedović
- (Socialist Federal Republic of Yugoslavia) Haris Karamehmedović
- (Bosnia and Herzegovina) Elvis Karić
- (Bosnia and Herzegovina) Mahir Karić
- (Socialist Federal Republic of Yugoslavia) Božo Kešelj
- (Bosnia and Herzegovina) Sanin Klarić
- (Socialist Federal Republic of Yugoslavia) Ivan Kljajo
- (Croatia) Ivan Knezović
- (Bosnia and Herzegovina) Rijad Kobiljar
- (Montenegro) Damir Kojašević
- (Socialist Federal Republic of Yugoslavia) Ivan Kolar
- (Bosnia and Herzegovina) Elvir Koljenović
- (Serbia) Nikola Komazec
- (Bosnia and Herzegovina) Haris Konjalić
- (Socialist Federal Republic of Yugoslavia) Vlatko Konjevod
- (Socialist Federal Republic of Yugoslavia) Predrag Koprivica
- (Slovenia) Filip Kosi
- (Serbia) Miroljub Kostić
- (Socialist Federal Republic of Yugoslavia) Robert Košar
- (Ivory Coast) Germain Kouadio
- (Bosnia and Herzegovina) Adnan Kovačević
- (Socialist Federal Republic of Yugoslavia) Goran Kovačević
- (Bosnia and Herzegovina) Vladan Kovačević
- (Socialist Federal Republic of Yugoslavia) Stanislav Kozak
- (Bosnia and Herzegovina) Alen Krak
- (Slovenia) Denis Kramar
- (Bosnia and Herzegovina) (Serbia) Damjan Krajišnik
- (Bosnia and Herzegovina) Anes Krdžalić
- (Bosnia and Herzegovina) Sulejman Krpić
- (Socialist Federal Republic of Yugoslavia) Simo Krunić
- (Bosnia and Herzegovina) Mirzet Kruprinac
- (Croatia) Mihael Kuprešak
- (Socialist Federal Republic of Yugoslavia) Dane Kuprešanin
- (Bosnia and Herzegovina) Numan Kurdić
- (Socialist Federal Republic of Yugoslavia) Predrag Kurteš
- (Bosnia and Herzegovina) Muamer Kurto
- (Socialist Federal Republic of Yugoslavia) Vahdet Kurtović
- (Socialist Federal Republic of Yugoslavia) Ćazim Kusturica
- (Bosnia and Herzegovina) Mićo Kuzmanović
- (Ghana) Francis Kyeremeh

== L ==
- (Serbia) Adem Ljajić
- (Socialist Federal Republic of Yugoslavia) Velislav Lazarević
- (Serbia) Darko Lazić
- (Socialist Federal Republic of Yugoslavia) Igor Lazić
- (Bosnia and Herzegovina) Sanjin Lelić
- (Bosnia and Herzegovina) Bojan Letić
- (Bosnia and Herzegovina) Vedad Leto
- (Estonia) Frank Liivak
- (Socialist Federal Republic of Yugoslavia) Rešad Limo
- (Socialist Federal Republic of Yugoslavia) Zoran Ljubičić
- (Bosnia and Herzegovina) Hamza Ljukovac
- (Socialist Federal Republic of Yugoslavia) Đuka Lovrić
- (Socialist Federal Republic of Yugoslavia) Franjo Lovrić
- (Socialist Federal Republic of Yugoslavia) Slobodan Lubura
- (Socialist Federal Republic of Yugoslavia) Enver Lugušić
- (Brazil) Emerson Reis Luiz
- (Socialist Federal Republic of Yugoslavia) Zoran Lukić
- (Croatia) Karlo Lulić

== M ==
- (Bosnia and Herzegovina) Marinko Mačkić
- (Bosnia and Herzegovina) Bojan Magazin
- (Socialist Federal Republic of Yugoslavia) Ekrem Maglajlija
- (Socialist Federal Republic of Yugoslavia) Osman Maglajlija
- (Bosnia and Herzegovina) Smajo Mahmutović
- (Socialist Federal Republic of Yugoslavia) Milan Makić
- (Bosnia and Herzegovina) Marko Maksimović
- (Bosnia and Herzegovina) Ajdin Maksumić
- (Cyprus) Rafail Mamas
- (Socialist Federal Republic of Yugoslavia) Nikola Mamontov
- (Socialist Federal Republic of Yugoslavia) Anton Mandić
- (Socialist Federal Republic of Yugoslavia) Lav Mantula
- (Brazil) Marciano José do Nascimento
- (Bosnia and Herzegovina) Goran Marković
- (Bosnia and Herzegovina) Matej Marković
- (Socialist Federal Republic of Yugoslavia) Želimir Marković
- (Socialist Federal Republic of Yugoslavia) Srboljub Markušević
- (England) (Zimbabwe) Shane Takudzwa Maroodza
- (Montenegro) Ilija Martinović
- (Bosnia and Herzegovina) Eldar Mašić
- (Bosnia and Herzegovina) Eldin Mašić
- (Montenegro) Marko Matanović
- (Croatia) Matija Matko
- (Croatia) Ivan Matošević
- (Bosnia and Herzegovina) Faris Mehić
- (Bosnia and Herzegovina) Anes H. Mehmedović
- (Bosnia and Herzegovina) Eldar Mehmedović
- (Socialist Federal Republic of Yugoslavia) Hidajet Mehremić
- (Ivory Coast) Souleymane Méité
- (Socialist Federal Republic of Yugoslavia) Samir Mekić
- (Socialist Federal Republic of Yugoslavia) Senad Melić
- (Serbia) Alen Melunović
- (Bosnia and Herzegovina) Jasmin Memišević
- (Bosnia and Herzegovina) (Croatia) Luka Menalo
- (Senegal) Albert Mendy
- (Socialist Federal Republic of Yugoslavia) Nijaz Merdanović
- (Socialist Federal Republic of Yugoslavia) Senad Merdanović
- (Bosnia and Herzegovina) Alen Mešanović
- (Bosnia and Herzegovina) Enes Mešanović
- (Bosnia and Herzegovina) Jasmin Mešanović
- (Bosnia and Herzegovina) Almir Mešetović
- (Bosnia and Herzegovina) Aldin Mešić
- (Bosnia and Herzegovina) Mirza Mešić
- (Bosnia and Herzegovina) Marko Mihojević
- (Montenegro) Nemanja Mijušković
- (Socialist Federal Republic of Yugoslavia) Nikola Mijušković
- (Croatia) Leo Mikić
- (Bosnia and Herzegovina) Jasmin Milak
- (Socialist Federal Republic of Yugoslavia) Nihad Milak
- (Bosnia and Herzegovina) Slobodan Milanović
- (Socialist Federal Republic of Yugoslavia) Miroslav Milenković
- (Bosnia and Herzegovina) Ninoslav Milenković
- (Croatia) (Bosnia and Herzegovina) Hrvoje Miličević
- (Socialist Federal Republic of Yugoslavia) Rudo Miličević
- (Socialist Federal Republic of Yugoslavia) Ranko Milić
- (Bosnia and Herzegovina) Nedim Milišić
- (Socialist Federal Republic of Yugoslavia) Dušan Milošević
- (Bosnia and Herzegovina) Semjon Milošević
- (Socialist Federal Republic of Yugoslavia) Ivica Mioč
- (Bosnia and Herzegovina) Damir Mirvić
- (Bosnia and Herzegovina) Muhamed Mirvić
- (Croatia) Petar Mišković
- (North Macedonia) Risto Mitrevski
- (Socialist Federal Republic of Yugoslavia) Slobodan Mitrić
- (Bosnia and Herzegovina) Nedim Mizdrak
- (Croatia) Mihael Mlinarić
- (Slovenia) Gregor Mohar
- (Socialist Federal Republic of Yugoslavia) Refik Muftić
- (Nigeria) Musa Muhammed
- (Bosnia and Herzegovina) Haris Muharemović
- (Bosnia and Herzegovina) Veldin Muharemović
- (Socialist Federal Republic of Yugoslavia) Ramo Muhić
- (Bosnia and Herzegovina) Nihad Mujagić
- (Bosnia and Herzegovina) Nihad Mujakić
- (Bosnia and Herzegovina) Haris Mujanić
- (Bosnia and Herzegovina) Mirsad Mujkić
- (Bosnia and Herzegovina) Nermin Mujkić
- (Bosnia and Herzegovina) Nihad Mujkić
- (Bosnia and Herzegovina) Nardin Mulahusejnović
- (Bosnia and Herzegovina) Enedin Mulalić
- (Socialist Federal Republic of Yugoslavia) Ismet Mulavdić
- (Bosnia and Herzegovina) Milan Muminović
- (Socialist Federal Republic of Yugoslavia) Avdo Murga
- (Socialist Federal Republic of Yugoslavia) Husref Musemić
- (Socialist Federal Republic of Yugoslavia) Vahidin Musemić
- (Bosnia and Herzegovina) Alen Mustafić
- (Luxembourg) (Bosnia and Herzegovina) Mirza Mustafić
- (Bosnia and Herzegovina) Zinedin Mustedanagić
- (Bosnia and Herzegovina) Sanin Mušija
- (Socialist Federal Republic of Yugoslavia) Džemaludin Mušović
- (Socialist Federal Republic of Yugoslavia) Fuad Muzurović

== N ==
- (Bosnia and Herzegovina) Safet Nadarević
- (Socialist Federal Republic of Yugoslavia) Nurif Nargilić
- (Bosnia and Herzegovina) Samer Naser
- (Bosnia and Herzegovina) Dalibor Nedić
- (Socialist Federal Republic of Yugoslavia) Miloš Nedić
- (Socialist Federal Republic of Yugoslavia) Drago Neorčić
- (Serbia) Vladimir Nikitović
- (Socialist Federal Republic of Yugoslavia) Agim Nikolić
- (Socialist Federal Republic of Yugoslavia) Besim Nikolić
- (Socialist Federal Republic of Yugoslavia) Salko Nikšić
- (Socialist Federal Republic of Yugoslavia) Milutin Ninković
- (Cameroon) Jean Louis Nouken
- (Socialist Federal Republic of Yugoslavia) Mile Novaković
- (Croatia) Saša Novaković
- (Bosnia and Herzegovina) Slobo Novaković
- (Socialist Federal Republic of Yugoslavia) Nerćes Novo
- (Slovenia) Samir Nuhanović
- (Bosnia and Herzegovina) Ajdin Nuhić
- (Bosnia and Herzegovina) Bakir Nurković

== O ==
- (Bosnia and Herzegovina) Emir Obuća
- (Bosnia and Herzegovina) Ševko Okić
- (Brazil) Renan Oliveira
- (Socialist Federal Republic of Yugoslavia) Edin Omanović
- (Croatia) Mirko Oremuš
- (Socialist Federal Republic of Yugoslavia) Abdulah Oruč
- (Bosnia and Herzegovina) Amer Osmanagić
- (Bosnia and Herzegovina) Adnan Osmanhodžić
- (Bosnia and Herzegovina) Adnan Osmanović
- (Bosnia and Herzegovina) Senedin Oštraković
- (Socialist Federal Republic of Yugoslavia) Nedžad Ovčina

== P ==
- (Socialist Federal Republic of Yugoslavia) Muhamed Paćuka
- (Bosnia and Herzegovina) Kerim Palić
- (Bosnia and Herzegovina) Omar Pamuk
- (Bosnia and Herzegovina) Dalibor Pandža
- (Serbia) Đorđe Pantić
- (Socialist Federal Republic of Yugoslavia) Vladimir Papović
- (Socialist Federal Republic of Yugoslavia) Svetozar Parađina
- (Bulgaria) Martin Paskalev
- (Socialist Federal Republic of Yugoslavia) Predrag Pašić
- (Bosnia and Herzegovina) Suad Pašukan
- (Federal Republic of Yugoslavia) (Bosnia and Herzegovina) Irfan Paučinac
- (Socialist Federal Republic of Yugoslavia) Ivica Pauković
- (Croatia) Domagoj Pavičić
- (Serbia) Bojan Pavlović
- (Socialist Federal Republic of Yugoslavia) Ivica Pavlović
- (Socialist Federal Republic of Yugoslavia) Vladimir Pecelj
- (Bosnia and Herzegovina) Edin Pehlić
- (Socialist Federal Republic of Yugoslavia) Stipe Pejak
- (Serbia) Aleksandar Pejović
- (Montenegro) Ljubomir Pejović
- (Bosnia and Herzegovina) Albin Pelak
- (Venezuela) Adalberto Peñaranda
- (Bosnia and Herzegovina) Adnan Pervan
- (Socialist Federal Republic of Yugoslavia) Ivica Petković
- (Socialist Federal Republic of Yugoslavia) Ranko Petković
- (Socialist Federal Republic of Yugoslavia) Vladimir Petković
- (Federal Republic of Yugoslavia) (Montenegro) Vukašin Petranović
- (Germany) (Bosnia and Herzegovina) (Croatia) Andria Petrović
- (Bosnia and Herzegovina) Selmir Pidro
- (Bosnia and Herzegovina) Nermin Pindžo
- (Bosnia and Herzegovina) Željko Pinek
- (Bosnia and Herzegovina) Ismir Pintol
- (Socialist Federal Republic of Yugoslavia) Denijal Pirić
- (Bosnia and Herzegovina) Šahin Pita
- (Bosnia and Herzegovina) Alem Plakalo
- (Bosnia and Herzegovina) Emir Plakalo
- (Socialist Federal Republic of Yugoslavia) Ranko Planinić
- (Socialist Federal Republic of Yugoslavia) Zdravko Plavšić
- (Bosnia and Herzegovina) Almir Pliska
- (Bosnia and Herzegovina) Harun Pločo
- (Socialist Federal Republic of Yugoslavia) Muhamed Podrug
- (Bosnia and Herzegovina) Ante Pokrajčić
- (Bosnia and Herzegovina) Aleksa Popović
- (Bosnia and Herzegovina) Sergej Popović
- (Socialist Federal Republic of Yugoslavia) Fahrudin Prljača
- (Socialist Federal Republic of Yugoslavia) Boško Prodanović
- (Serbia) Radoš Protić
- (Soviet Union) Aleksei Prudnikov
- (Socialist Federal Republic of Yugoslavia) Nikola Prvulović
- (Socialist Federal Republic of Yugoslavia) Antal Puhalak
- (Bosnia and Herzegovina) Dario Purić
- (Socialist Federal Republic of Yugoslavia) Denijal Purković
- (Socialist Federal Republic of Yugoslavia) Željko Pustivuk
- (Bosnia and Herzegovina) Bojan Puzigaća

== R ==
- (Bosnia and Herzegovina) Darko Raca
- (Socialist Federal Republic of Yugoslavia) Ferid Radeljaš
- (Socialist Federal Republic of Yugoslavia) Hamdo Radeljaš
- (Socialist Federal Republic of Yugoslavia) Miladin Radičević
- (Socialist Federal Republic of Yugoslavia) Manojlo Radinović
- (Socialist Federal Republic of Yugoslavia) Ivan Radoš
- (Bosnia and Herzegovina) Samir Radovac
- (Serbia) (Bosnia and Herzegovina) Slaviša Radović
- (Montenegro) Marko Radulović
- (Bosnia and Herzegovina) Amar Rahmanović
- (Socialist Federal Republic of Yugoslavia) Dejan Raičković
- (Socialist Federal Republic of Yugoslavia) Ante Rajković
- (Socialist Federal Republic of Yugoslavia) Milan Rajlić
- (Bosnia and Herzegovina) Irfan Ramić
- (Socialist Federal Republic of Yugoslavia) Miralem Ramić
- (Bosnia and Herzegovina) Tarik Ramić
- (Socialist Federal Republic of Yugoslavia) Muslija Ramović
- (Serbia) (Bosnia and Herzegovina) Edvin Rastoder
- (Bosnia and Herzegovina) Admir Raščić
- (Socialist Federal Republic of Yugoslavia) Rajko Rašević
- (Socialist Federal Republic of Yugoslavia) Đuka Rebac
- (Socialist Federal Republic of Yugoslavia) Sulejman Rebac
- (Bosnia and Herzegovina) Hamza Redžić
- (Sweden) Rasim Reiz
- (Socialist Federal Republic of Yugoslavia) Srebrenko Repčić
- (Socialist Federal Republic of Yugoslavia) (Bosnia and Herzegovina) (Bosnia and Herzegovina) Senad Repuh
- (Bosnia and Herzegovina) Ševkija Resić
- (Socialist Federal Republic of Yugoslavia) Aleksandar Ristić
- (Serbia) Andreja Ristić
- (North Macedonia) Robert Ristovski
- (North Macedonia) Stefan Ristovski
- (Bosnia and Herzegovina) Mirza Rizvanović
- (Portugal) Gelson Rocha
- (Serbia) Emil Rockov
- (Croatia) Lovre Rogić
- (Socialist Federal Republic of Yugoslavia) Suvad Rovčanin
- (Bosnia and Herzegovina) Edin Rustemović

== S ==
- (Bosnia and Herzegovina) Amar Sabljica
- (Bosnia and Herzegovina) Elvis Sadiković
- (Bosnia and Herzegovina) Rijad Sadiku
- (Bosnia and Herzegovina) Mirnel Sadović
- (Bosnia and Herzegovina) Đani Salčin
- (Bosnia and Herzegovina) Mufid Salčinović
- (Socialist Federal Republic of Yugoslavia) Ferid Salihović
- (Serbia) Fuad Salihović
- (Bosnia and Herzegovina) Elvis Sarić
- (Serbia) Marko Savić
- (Socialist Federal Republic of Yugoslavia) Radomir Savić
- (Belgium) Jack Senga
- (Bosnia and Herzegovina) Nedžad Serdarević
- (Bosnia and Herzegovina) Ivan Sesar
- (Croatia) Deni Simeunović
- (Socialist Federal Republic of Yugoslavia) Dragoljub Simić
- (Socialist Federal Republic of Yugoslavia) Radoslav Simić
- (Socialist Federal Republic of Yugoslavia) Haris Smajić
- (Bosnia and Herzegovina) Ervin Smajlagić
- (Bosnia and Herzegovina) Semir Smajlagić
- (Socialist Federal Republic of Yugoslavia) Ibrahim Sirćo
- (Bosnia and Herzegovina) (Bosnia and Herzegovina) Džemo Smječanin
- (Bosnia and Herzegovina) Admir Softić
- (Croatia) Vinko Soldo
- (Bosnia and Herzegovina) Duško Stajić
- (Serbia) Miloš Stanojević
- (Serbia) Milan Stepanov
- (Socialist Federal Republic of Yugoslavia) Mladen Stipić
- (Serbia) (Montenegro) Miloš Stojčev
- (Bosnia and Herzegovina) Memnun Suljagić
- (Bosnia and Herzegovina) Nihad Suljević
- (Bosnia and Herzegovina) Asmir Suljić
- (Socialist Federal Republic of Yugoslavia) Safet Sušić
- (Socialist Federal Republic of Yugoslavia) Sead Sušić
- (Bosnia and Herzegovina) Tino-Sven Sušić

== Š ==
- (Bosnia and Herzegovina) Halid Šabanović
- (Bosnia and Herzegovina) Muhamed Šahinović
- (Bosnia and Herzegovina) Zdravko Šaraba
- (Socialist Federal Republic of Yugoslavia) Murat Šaran
- (Bosnia and Herzegovina) Edin Šaranović
- (Socialist Federal Republic of Yugoslavia) Asim Šarenkapa
- (Croatia) Ivan Šarić
- (Bosnia and Herzegovina) Samir Šarić
- (Bosnia and Herzegovina) Fuad Šašivarević
- (Serbia) Vučina Šćepanović
- (Bosnia and Herzegovina) Adnan Šećerović
- (Bosnia and Herzegovina) Nail Šehović
- (Socialist Federal Republic of Yugoslavia) Salih Šehović
- (Bosnia and Herzegovina) Edin Šeko
- (Bosnia and Herzegovina) Besim Šerbečić
- (Croatia) Vicko Ševelj
- (Socialist Federal Republic of Yugoslavia) Miroslav Šilić
- (Socialist Federal Republic of Yugoslavia) Sreten Šiljkut
- (Bosnia and Herzegovina) Mladen Šimunović
- (Bosnia and Herzegovina) Aladin Šišić
- (Socialist Federal Republic of Yugoslavia) Anton Škaro
- (Bosnia and Herzegovina) Alen Škoro
- (Bosnia and Herzegovina) Anel Škoro
- (Socialist Federal Republic of Yugoslavia) Goran Šljivić
- (Socialist Federal Republic of Yugoslavia) Slavko Šljivić
- (Socialist Federal Republic of Yugoslavia) Edhem Šljivo
- (Bosnia and Herzegovina) Almir Šmigalović
- (Montenegro) Aleksandar Šofranac
- (Bosnia and Herzegovina) Edin Šopović
- (Bosnia and Herzegovina) Jasmin Šuntić
- (Serbia) Radan Šunjevarić
- (Bosnia and Herzegovina) Arman Šutković
- (Socialist Federal Republic of Yugoslavia) Ivan Švaljek
- (Socialist Federal Republic of Yugoslavia) Ratib Švraka
- (Socialist Federal Republic of Yugoslavia) Suad Švraka
- (Socialist Federal Republic of Yugoslavia) Zijad Švrakić

== T ==
- (Bosnia and Herzegovina) Talha Tabaković
- (Croatia) Mario Tadejević
- (Federal Republic of Yugoslavia) Edin Tahirović
- (Socialist Federal Republic of Yugoslavia) Dragan Talajić
- (Bosnia and Herzegovina) Benjamin Tatar
- (Serbia) Ivan Tatomirović
- (Bosnia and Herzegovina) Rijad Telalović
- (Bosnia and Herzegovina) Vahidin Terzić
- (Socialist Federal Republic of Yugoslavia) Anđelko Tešan
- (Socialist Federal Republic of Yugoslavia) Milan Tešanović
- (Socialist Federal Republic of Yugoslavia) Muhidin Teskeredžić
- (Bosnia and Herzegovina) Ahmed Tiro
- (Serbia) Mirko Todorović
- (Bosnia and Herzegovina) Ognjen Todorović
- (Bosnia and Herzegovina) Almir Tolja
- (Socialist Federal Republic of Yugoslavia) Branko Tomanović
- (Socialist Federal Republic of Yugoslavia) Dragan Tomašević
- (Serbia) Nemanja Tomašević
- (Bosnia and Herzegovina) Sedin Torlak
- (Bosnia and Herzegovina) Jasmin Toromanović
- (Socialist Federal Republic of Yugoslavia) Momčilo Tošić
- (Socialist Federal Republic of Yugoslavia) Srboljub Tošić
- (Bosnia and Herzegovina) Muharem Trako
- (Bosnia and Herzegovina) Anid Travančić
- (Bosnia and Herzegovina) Sanel Trebinjac
- (Bosnia and Herzegovina) Ivan Trifković
- (Bosnia and Herzegovina) Vule Trivunović
- (Bosnia and Herzegovina) Edin Tucaković
- (Bosnia and Herzegovina) Nedin Tucaković
- (Bosnia and Herzegovina) Emir Tufek
- (Socialist Federal Republic of Yugoslavia) Hidajet Tulumović
- (Romania) Grigore Turda
- (Switzerland) (Bosnia and Herzegovina) Aldin Turkeš
- (Bosnia and Herzegovina) (Bosnia and Herzegovina) Almir Turković
- (Socialist Federal Republic of Yugoslavia) Nedim Tutić

== U ==
- (Socialist Federal Republic of Yugoslavia) Fahrudin Ulak
- (Croatia) Bruno Unušić
- (Socialist Federal Republic of Yugoslavia) Mile Urošević
- (Bosnia and Herzegovina) Almir Ušanović
- (Bosnia and Herzegovina) (Bosnia and Herzegovina) Dženan Uščuplić
- (Bosnia and Herzegovina) Ervin Uščuplić
- (Socialist Federal Republic of Yugoslavia) Ismet Uzunović

== V ==
- (Bosnia and Herzegovina) (Bosnia and Herzegovina) Azrudin Valentić
- (Bosnia and Herzegovina) Dal Varešanović
- (Socialist Federal Republic of Yugoslavia) (Bosnia and Herzegovina) (Bosnia and Herzegovina) Mirza Varešanović
- (Socialist Federal Republic of Yugoslavia) Vejsil Varupa
- (Bosnia and Herzegovina) Anes Vazda
- (Socialist Federal Republic of Yugoslavia) Nermin Vazda
- (Bosnia and Herzegovina) Demirel Veladžić
- (Socialist Federal Republic of Yugoslavia) Jasminko Velić
- (North Macedonia) Krste Velkoski
- (Socialist Federal Republic of Yugoslavia) Nenad Vidaković
- (Socialist Federal Republic of Yugoslavia) Risto Vidaković
- (Socialist Federal Republic of Yugoslavia) Želimir Vidović
- (Socialist Federal Republic of Yugoslavia) Vukašin Višnjevac
- (Socialist Federal Republic of Yugoslavia) Sakib Viteškić
- (Bosnia and Herzegovina) Salih Viteškić
- (Colombia) Kevin Viveros
- (Socialist Federal Republic of Yugoslavia) Anton Vlajčić
- (Socialist Federal Republic of Yugoslavia) Damir Vrabac
- (Socialist Federal Republic of Yugoslavia) Dinko Vrabac
- (Bosnia and Herzegovina) Mario Vrančić
- (Bosnia and Herzegovina) Kenan Vrban
- (Bosnia and Herzegovina) Avdija Vršajević
- (Socialist Federal Republic of Yugoslavia) Dragoslav Vujanović
- (Socialist Federal Republic of Yugoslavia) Svetozar Vujović
- (Socialist Federal Republic of Yugoslavia) Dragoslav Vukadin
- (Socialist Federal Republic of Yugoslavia) Slaviša Vukićević
- (Socialist Federal Republic of Yugoslavia) Sretko Vuksanović
- (Serbia) Irfan Vušljanin

== Z ==
- (Bosnia and Herzegovina) Vlado Zadro
- (Bosnia and Herzegovina) Ibrahim Zahirović
- (Bosnia and Herzegovina) (Bosnia and Herzegovina) Ševal Zahirović
- (Serbia) Nenad Zečević
- (Croatia) Zoran Zekić
- (Bosnia and Herzegovina) Samir Zeljković
- (Bosnia and Herzegovina) Sead Zilić
- (Bosnia and Herzegovina) Almedin Ziljkić
- (Serbia) Nemanja Zlatković
- (Bosnia and Herzegovina) Dilaver Zrnanović
- (Bosnia and Herzegovina) Muhidin Zukić
- (Socialist Federal Republic of Yugoslavia) Zijad Zupčević

== Ž ==
- (Socialist Federal Republic of Yugoslavia) Marcel Žigante
- (Socialist Federal Republic of Yugoslavia) Drago Žigman
- (Socialist Federal Republic of Yugoslavia) Dobrivoje Živkov
- (Croatia) Boris Živković
- (Croatia) Filip Živković
- (Socialist Federal Republic of Yugoslavia) Radenko Živković
- (Socialist Federal Republic of Yugoslavia) Nedžad Živojević

(not completed yet)
