= 1966–67 FK Sarajevo season =

Sarajevo
1966–67 season
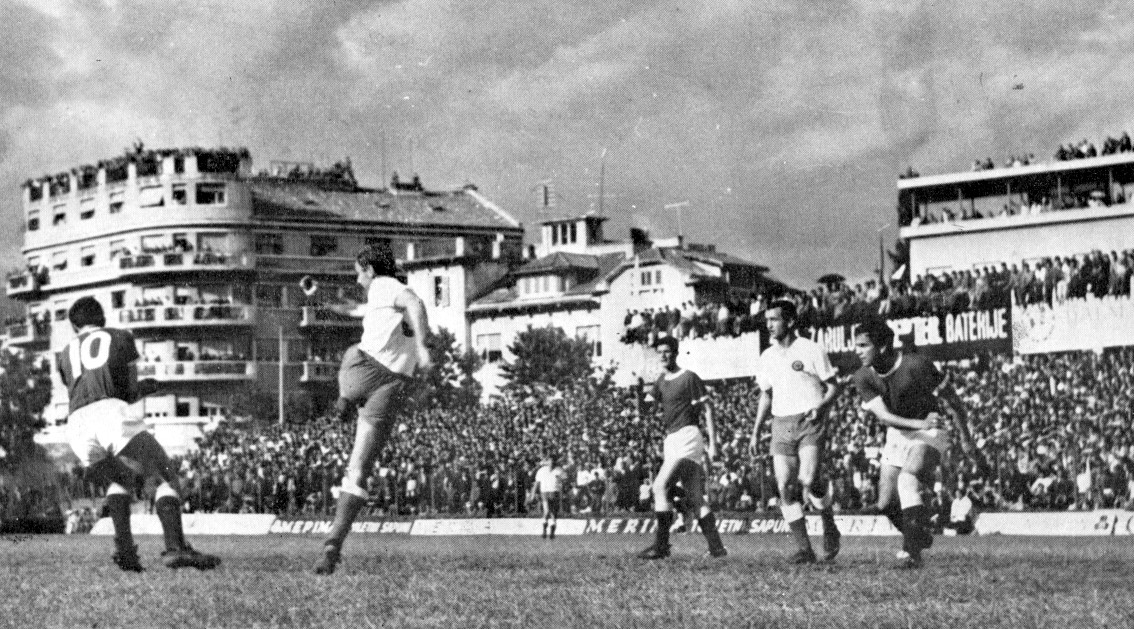
- Yugoslav Cup final between Hajduk Split and Sarajevo
- Technical director: Ibrahim Biogradlić
- President: Mile Perković
- Manager: Miroslav Brozović
- Stadium: Koševo City Stadium
- Yugoslav First League: Winners
- Yugoslav Cup: Runners-up
- Mitropa Cup: Quarter-finals
- Top goalscorer: League: Vahidin Musemić (16); All: Vahidin Musemić (23)
- Highest home attendance: 40,000 vs Željezničar (12 March 1967)
- Lowest home attendance: 1,000 vs Romanija (21 September 1966)
- Average home league attendance: 17,300
- Biggest win: Sarajevo 9–1 Romanija (21 September 1966)
- Biggest defeat: Újpesti Dózsa 5–1 Sarajevo (29 March 1967)

The 1966–67 Sarajevo season was the club's 20th season in history, and their 18th season in the top flight of Yugoslav football, the Yugoslav First League. Besides competing in the First League, the team competed in the National Cup and Mitropa Cup. In this season Sarajevo became the Yugoslav champion for the first time in the history of the club.

== Squad information ==
=== First-team squad ===
Note: Flags indicate national team as defined under FIFA eligibility rules; some limited exceptions apply. Players may hold more than one non-FIFA nationality.

No.	Pos.	Nation	Player
—	GK	YUG	Ibrahim Sirćo
—	GK	YUG	Refik Muftić
—	GK	YUG	Boro Beatović
—	DF	YUG	Milenko Bajić
—	DF	YUG	Ibrahim Biogradlić
—	DF	YUG	Mirsad Fazlagić (captain)
—	DF	YUG	Fuad Muzurović
—	DF	YUG	Sead Jesenković
—	DF	YUG	Svetozar Vujović
—	DF	YUG	Sreten Dilberović
—	DF	YUG	Anton Mandić

No.	Pos.	Nation	Player
—	MF	YUG	Milan Makić
—	MF	YUG	Ekrem Maglajlija
—	MF	YUG	Sreten Šiljkut
—	MF	YUG	Fahrudin Prljača
—	FW	YUG	Vahidin Musemić
—	FW	YUG	Asim Ferhatović
—	FW	YUG	Boško Prodanović
—	FW	YUG	Boško Antić
—	FW	YUG	Stjepan Blažević
—	FW	YUG	Dragan Vujanović

== Competitions ==
=== Overview ===
Competition	First match	Last match	Starting round	Final position	Record							
Competition	First match	Last match	Starting round	Final position	Pld	W	D	L	GF	GA	GD	Win %
First League	21 August 1966	2 July 1967	Matchday 1	Winners	30	18	6	6	51	29	+22	60.00
Yugoslav Cup	21 September 1966	24 May 1967	Qualifications	Runners-up	7	6	0	1	23	7	+16	85.71
Mitropa Cup	9 November 1966	29 March 1967	Round of 16	Quarter-finals	4	1	0	3	6	10	−4	25.00
Total					41	25	6	10	80	46	+34	60.98

Last updated: complete
Source: Competitions

=== Yugoslav First League ===
==== League table ====
Pos	Team	Pld	W	D	L	GF	GA	GD	Pts	Qualification or relegation
1	Sarajevo (C)	30	18	6	6	51	29	+22	42	Qualification for European Cup first round
2	Dinamo Zagreb	30	15	10	5	42	21	+21	40	Invitation for Inter-Cities Fairs Cup first round
3	Partizan	30	14	10	6	52	28	+24	38	Invitation for Inter-Cities Fairs Cup first round
4	Vojvodina	30	12	9	9	40	39	+1	33	Invitation for Inter-Cities Fairs Cup first round
5	Red Star Belgrade	30	12	8	10	53	46	+7	32	Invitation for Mitropa Cup

Source: rsssf.org
Rules for classification: 1) points; 2) goal difference; 3) number of goals scored.
(C) Champions

==== Matches ====
21 August 1966 1	Sarajevo	1–0	Sutjeska	Sarajevo
				Stadium: Koševo City Stadium; Attendance: 6,500

28 August 1966 2	Željezničar	0–2	Sarajevo	Sarajevo
				Stadium: Stadion Grbavica; Attendance: 20,000

4 September 1966 3	Sarajevo	1–1	Partizan	Sarajevo
				Stadium: Koševo City Stadium; Attendance: 30,000

11 September 1966 4	Hajduk	0–1	Sarajevo	Split
				Stadium: Stadion Stari plac Attendance: 18,000

25 September 1966 5	Sarajevo	2–1	Olimpija	Sarajevo
				Stadium: Koševo City Stadium; Attendance: 10,000

2 October 1966 6	Zagreb	0–1	Sarajevo	Zagreb
				Stadium: Stadion Kranjčevićeva; Attendance: 10,000

9 October 1966 7	Sarajevo	1–0	Radnički	Sarajevo
				Stadium: Koševo City Stadium; Attendance: 12,000

16 October 1966 8	Rijeka	0–4	Sarajevo	Rijeka
				Stadium: Stadion Kantrida; Attendance: 8,000

23 October 1966 9	Sarajevo	1–1	Velež	Sarajevo
				Stadium: Koševo City Stadium; Attendance: 15,000

30 October 1966 10	Sarajevo	1–0	Red Star	Sarajevo
				Stadium: Koševo City Stadium; Attendance: 25,000

12 November 1966 11	OFK Beograd	3–1	Sarajevo	Belgrade
				Stadium: Omladinski Stadium; Attendance: 4,000

20 November 1966 12	Sarajevo	3–1	Vojvodina	Sarajevo
				Stadium: Koševo City Stadium; Attendance: 10,000

27 November 1966 13	Vardar	1–1	Sarajevo	Skopje
				Stadium: Gradski stadion Skopje; Attendance: 20,000

4 December 1966 14	Sarajevo	1–1	Dinamo	Sarajevo
				Stadium: Koševo City Stadium; Attendance: 30,000

11 December 1966 15	Čelik	1–3	Sarajevo	Zenica
				Stadium: Stadion Blatuša; Attendance: 9,000

5 March 1967 16	Sutjeska	2–3	Sarajevo	Nikšić
				Stadium: Gradski stadion (Nikšić); Attendance: 10,000

12 March 1967 17	Sarajevo	2–0	Željezničar	Sarajevo
				Stadium: Koševo City Stadium; Attendance: 40,000

19 March 1967 18	Partizan	2–1	Sarajevo	Belgrade
				Stadium: JNA Stadium; Attendance: 45,000

26 March 1967 19	Sarajevo	0–0	Hajduk	Sarajevo
				Stadium: Koševo City Stadium; Attendance: 22,000

2 April 1967 20	Olimpija	1–2	Sarajevo	Ljubljana
				Stadium: Bežigrad Stadium; Attendance: 10,000

9 April 1967 21	Sarajevo	2–3	Zagreb	Sarajevo
				Stadium: Koševo City Stadium; Attendance: 6,000

16 April 1967 22	Radnički	1–0	Sarajevo	Niš
				Stadium: Čair Stadium; Attendance: 15,000

7 May 1967 23	Sarajevo	2–0	Rijeka	Sarajevo
				Stadium: Koševo City Stadium; Attendance: 7,000

21 May 1967 24	Velež	1–0	Sarajevo	Mostar
				Stadium: Stadion pod Bijelim Brijegom; Attendance: 12,000

28 May 1967 25	Red Star	1–3	Sarajevo	Belgrade
				Stadium: Red Star Stadium; Attendance: 35,000

4 June 1967 26	Sarajevo	3–1	OFK Beograd	Sarajevo
				Stadium: Koševo City Stadium; Attendance: 4,000

11 June 1967 27	Vojvodina	4–2	Sarajevo	Novi Sad
				Stadium: Stadion Vojvodine; Attendance: 12,000

18 June 1967 28	Sarajevo	2–1	Vardar	Sarajevo
				Stadium: Koševo City Stadium; Attendance: 12,000

25 June 1967 29	Dinamo	0–0	Sarajevo	Zagreb
				Stadium: Stadion Maksimir; Attendance: 40,000

2 July 1967 30	Sarajevo	5–2	Čelik	Sarajevo
				Stadium: Koševo City Stadium; Attendance: 30,000

=== Yugoslav Cup ===
==== Qualifications ====
21 September 1966 Round of 16	Sarajevo	9–1	Romanija	Sarajevo
17:00 CEST (UTC+2)	Musemić 19'; Prljača 35', 46'; Ferhatović 48'; Antić 70', 71'; Boško Prodanović 75', 82', 89'	Report	Spahić 88'	Stadium: Koševo City Stadium; Attendance: 1,000

6 November 1966 Quarter-finals	Jedinstvo	1–4	Sarajevo	Brčko
		Report	Antić; Musemić	Stadium: Stadion Sedmi april Attendance: 5,000

30 November 1966 Semi-finals	Sarajevo	5–3	Velež	Sarajevo
	Antić; Blažević; Prodanović; Musemić	Report		Stadium: Koševo City Stadium; Attendance: 2,000

==== Round of 16 ====
26 February 1967	Dinamo	0–1	Sarajevo	Zagreb
		Report		Stadium: Stadion Maksimir; Attendance: 25,000

==== Quarter-finals ====
15 March 1967	Sarajevo	2–0	Napredak	Sarajevo
		Report		Stadium: Koševo City Stadium; Attendance: 4,000

==== Semi-finals ====
5 April 1967	Sarajevo	1–0	Partizan	Sarajevo
	Musemić 24'	Report		Stadium: Koševo City Stadium; Attendance: 35,000

==== Final ====
24 May 1967	Hajduk	2–1	Sarajevo	Split
	Ferić 43'; Obradov 52'	Report	Musemić 74'	Stadium: Stadion Stari plac Attendance: 18,000; Referee: Lado Jakše (Ljubljana)

=== Mitropa Cup ===
==== Round of 16 ====
9 November 1966 First leg	Cagliari (Italy)	2–1	(Socialist Federal Republic of Yugoslavia) Sarajevo	Cagliari, Italy
		Report		Stadium: Stadio Amsicora; Attendance: 30,000

23 November 1966 Second leg	Sarajevo (Socialist Federal Republic of Yugoslavia)	3–1 (4–3 agg.)	(Italy) Cagliari	Sarajevo, Yugoslavia
	Musemić 24'; Prljača 70'; Prodanović 82'	Report	Greatti 68'	Stadium: Koševo City Stadium; Attendance: 7,000

==== Quarter-finals ====
22 March 1967 First leg	Sarajevo (Socialist Federal Republic of Yugoslavia)	1–2	(Hungary) Újpesti Dózsa	Sarajevo, Yugoslavia
		Report		Stadium: Koševo City Stadium; Attendance: 15,000

29 March 1967 Second leg	Újpesti Dózsa (Hungary)	5–1 (7–2 agg.)	(Socialist Federal Republic of Yugoslavia) Sarajevo	Budapest, Hungary
		Report		Stadium: Megyeri úti stadion Attendance: 25,000

== Statistics ==
Appearances

Rank	Player	Games
1	Milenko Bajić	41
2	Boško Antić	40
3	Mirsad Fazlagić	39
4	Boško Prodanović	38
5	Sead Jesenković	38

Goalscorers

Rank	Player	Goals
1	Vahidin Musemić	23
2	Boško Antić	21+9
3	Boško Prodanović	17
4	Fahrudin Prljača	8
5	Sreten Šiljkut	4

== Winning squad ==
Champions: FK Sarajevo
Player	League	
Player	Matches	Goals
Boško Antić	30	14
Milenko Bajić	30	0
Mirsad Fazlagić	30	0
Fahrudin Prljača	29	5
Sead Jesenković	29	0
Boško Prodanović	28	10
Vahidin Musemić	25	16
Sreten Šiljkut	25	3
Ibrahim Sirćo (goalkeeper)	25	0
Fuad Muzurović	23	0
Stjepan Blažević	20	0
Ibrahim Biogradlić (Note: played only the fall part of the season)	15	0
Dragan Vujanović	9	1
Asim Ferhatović (Note: retired from playing football during the first part of the season at the age of 33)	8	0
Refik Muftić (goalkeeper) (Note: went to serve the mandatory army stint shortly after the season began)	5	0
Sreten Dilberović	4	0
Anton Mandić	3	0
Svetozar Vujović (Note: went to serve the mandatory army stint shortly after the season began)	2	0
Osman Maglajlija	1	0
Miodrag Makić	1	0
Head coach: Miroslav Brozović
