= 1967–68 FK Sarajevo season =

Sarajevo
1967–68 season
- President: Milivoje Šteković
- Manager: Franjo Lovrić; Munib Saračević
- Stadium: Koševo City Stadium
- Yugoslav First League: 7th
- Yugoslav Cup: Qualifications
- European Cup: Second round
- Highest home attendance: 37,222 vs Manchester United (15 November 1967)
- Lowest home attendance: 3,000 (3 matches)
- Average home league attendance: 8,880
- Biggest win: Sarajevo 6–1 Proleter (24 March 1968)
- Biggest defeat: Olimpija 4–0 Sarajevo (4 December 1967); Zagreb 4–0 Sarajevo (31 March 1968)

The 1967–68 Sarajevo season was the club's 21st season in history, and their 19th season in the top flight of Yugoslav football, the Yugoslav First League. Besides competing in the First League, the team competed in the National Cup and the European Cup.

== Squad information ==
=== First-team squad ===
Note: Flags indicate national team as defined under FIFA eligibility rules; some limited exceptions apply. Players may hold more than one non-FIFA nationality.

No.	Pos.	Nation	Player
—	GK	YUG	Boro Bejatović
—	GK	YUG	Refik Muftić
—	GK	YUG	Ibrahim Sirćo
—	DF	YUG	Milenko Bajić
—	DF	YUG	Tomo Braunović
—	DF	YUG	Mirsad Fazlagić
—	DF	YUG	Sead Jesenković
—	DF	YUG	Milan Makić
—	DF	YUG	Fuad Muzurović
—	DF	YUG	Fahrudin Prljača
—	DF	YUG	Anđelko Tešan
—	DF	YUG	Svetozar Vujović

No.	Pos.	Nation	Player
—	MF	YUG	Stjepan Blažević
—	MF	YUG	Sreten Šiljkut
—	MF	YUG	Dragan Vujanović
—	FW	YUG	Boško Antić
—	FW	YUG	Muhamed Čajić
—	FW	YUG	Salih Delalić
—	FW	YUG	Esad Hadžijusufović
—	FW	YUG	Fuad Hamzić
—	FW	YUG	Vahidin Musemić
—	FW	YUG	Boško Prodanović
—	FW	YUG	Fahrudin Ulak

== Competitions ==
=== Overview ===
Competition	First match	Last match	Starting round	Final position	Record							
Competition	First match	Last match	Starting round	Final position	Pld	W	D	L	GF	GA	GD	Win %
Yugoslav First League	20 August 1967	30 June 1968	Matchday 1	7th	30	13	3	14	46	39	+7	43.33
Yugoslav Cup	28 September 1967	17 December 1967	Qualifications	Qualifications	2	1	0	1	5	3	+2	50.00
European Cup	20 September 1967	29 November 1967	First round	Second round	4	1	2	1	6	4	+2	25.00
Total					36	15	5	16	57	46	+11	41.67

Source: Competitions

=== Yugoslav First League ===
==== League table ====
Pos	Team	Pld	W	D	L	GF	GA	GD	Pts
5	Željezničar	30	12	9	9	44	34	+10	33
6	Vardar	30	10	10	10	31	37	−6	30
7	Sarajevo	30	13	3	14	46	39	+7	29
8	Proleter Zrenjanin	30	10	9	11	35	44	−9	29
9	Radnički Niš	30	13	2	15	36	48	−12	28

Source: rsssf.org
Rules for classification: 1) points; 2) goal difference; 3) number of goals scored.

==== Matches ====
20 August 1967 1	Velež Mostar	3–1	Sarajevo	Mostar
		Report		Stadium: Stadion pod Bijelim Brijegom; Attendance: 8,000

27 August 1967 2	Sarajevo	2–1	Vardar	Sarajevo
		Report		Stadium: Koševo City Stadium; Attendance: 5,100

3 September 1967 3	Proleter Zrenjanin	2–1	Sarajevo	Zrenjanin
		Report		Stadium: Stadion Karađorđev park Attendance: 15,000

10 September 1967 4	Sarajevo	5–0	Zagreb	Sarajevo
		Report		Stadium: Koševo City Stadium; Attendance: 10,000

17 September 1967 5	Partizan	1–0	Sarajevo	Belgrade
		Report		Stadium: JNA Stadium; Attendance: 30,000

24 September 1967 6	Sarajevo	2–1	OFK Beograd	Sarajevo
		Report		Stadium: Koševo City Stadium; Attendance: 10,000

11 October 1967 7	Maribor	2–1	Sarajevo	Maribor
		Report		Stadium: Ljudski vrt Attendance: 6,000

15 October 1967 8	Dinamo Zagreb	1–0	Sarajevo	Zagreb
		Report		Stadium: Stadion Maksimir; Attendance: 20,000

22 October 1967 9	Sarajevo	2–0	Radnički Niš	Sarajevo
		Report		Stadium: Koševo City Stadium; Attendance: 6,000

29 October 1967 10	Rijeka	3–0	Sarajevo	Rijeka
		Report		Stadium: Stadion Kantrida; Attendance: 6,000

5 November 1967 11	Sarajevo	0–1	Vojvodina	Sarajevo
		Report		Stadium: Koševo City Stadium; Attendance: 5,000

19 November 1967 12	Red Star Belgrade	1–0	Sarajevo	Belgrade
		Report		Stadium: Marakana Stadium; Attendance: 15,000

26 November 1967 13	Sarajevo	4–2	Hajduk Split	Sarajevo
		Report		Stadium: Koševo City Stadium; Attendance: 6,000

4 December 1967 14	Olimpija Ljubljana	4–0	Sarajevo	Ljubljana
		Report		Stadium: Bežigrad Stadium; Attendance: 8,000

10 December 1967 15	Sarajevo	1–1	Željezničar	Sarajevo
		Report		Stadium: Koševo City Stadium; Attendance: 12,000

10 March 1968 16	Sarajevo	2–1	Velež Mostar	Sarajevo
		Report		Stadium: Koševo City Stadium; Attendance: 8,100

17 March 1968 17	Vardar	2–1	Sarajevo	Skopje
		Report		Stadium: Skopje City Stadium; Attendance: 10,000

24 March 1968 18	Sarajevo	6–1	Proleter Zrenjanin	Sarajevo
		Report		Stadium: Koševo City Stadium; Attendance: 5,000

31 April 1968 19	Zagreb	4–0	Sarajevo	Zagreb
		Report		Stadium: Stadion Kranjčevićeva; Attendance: 6,000

14 April 1968 20	Sarajevo	3–1	Partizan	Sarajevo
		Report		Stadium: Koševo City Stadium; Attendance: 25,000

17 April 1968 21	OFK Beograd	3–1	Sarajevo	Belgrade
		Report		Stadium: Karaburma Stadium; Attendance: 15,000

1 May 1968 22	Sarajevo	3–0	Maribor	Sarajevo
		Report		Stadium: Koševo City Stadium; Attendance: 3,000

5 May 1968 23	Sarajevo	2–0	Dinamo Zagreb	Sarajevo
		Report		Stadium: Koševo City Stadium; Attendance: 12,000

12 May 1968 24	Radnički Niš	1–0	Sarajevo	Niš
		Report		Stadium: Čair Stadium; Attendance: 5,000

18 May 1968 25	Sarajevo	3–0	Rijeka	Sarajevo
		Report		Stadium: Koševo City Stadium; Attendance: 3,000

26 May 1968 26	Vojvodina	0–0	Sarajevo	Novi Sad
		Report		Stadium: Stadion Vojvodine; Attendance: 6,000

16 June 1968 27	Sarajevo	1–1	Red Star Belgrade	Sarajevo
		Report		Stadium: Koševo City Stadium; Attendance: 20,000

19 June 1968 28	Hajduk Split	1–0	Sarajevo	Split
		Report		Stadium: Plinara Stadion; Attendance: 10,000

23 June 1968 29	Sarajevo	3–0	Olimpija Ljubljana	Sarajevo
		Report		Stadium: Koševo City Stadium; Attendance: 3,000

30 June 1968 30	Željezničar	1–2	Sarajevo	Sarajevo
		Report		Stadium: Stadion Grbavica; Attendance: 10,000

=== Yugoslav Cup ===
==== Qualifications ====
28 September 1967 Round of 16	Bosna Visoko	1–2	Sarajevo	Visoko
15:00 CEST (UTC+2)		Report		Stadium: Sedmi april Attendance: 1,500

17 December 1967 Quarter-finals	Velež Mostar	4–1	Sarajevo	Mostar
11:00 CST (UTC+1)		Report		Stadium: Stadion pod Bijelim Brijegom; Attendance: 2,000

=== European Cup ===
==== First round ====
20 September 1967 First leg	Olympiakos Nicosia (Cyprus)	2–2	(Socialist Federal Republic of Yugoslavia) Sarajevo	Nicosia, Cyprus
	Kettenis 1'; Tešan 43' (o.g.)	Report	Antić 50', 58'	Stadium: GSP Stadium; Attendance: 10,000; Referee: Aurelio Angonese (Italy)

18 October 1967 Second leg	Sarajevo (Socialist Federal Republic of Yugoslavia)	3–1 (5–3 agg.)	(Cyprus) Olympiakos Nicosia	Sarajevo, Yugoslavia
17:00 CEST (UTC+2)	Antić 33'; Šiljkut 83', 84'	Report	Kettenis 79'	Stadium: Koševo City Stadium; Attendance: 8,000; Referee: Gyula Gere (Hungary)

==== Second round ====
15 November 1967 First leg	Sarajevo (Socialist Federal Republic of Yugoslavia)	0–0	(England) Manchester United	Sarajevo, Yugoslavia
18:00 CET (UTC+1)		Report		Stadium: Koševo City Stadium; Attendance: 37,222; Referee: Francesco Francescon (Italy)

29 November 1967 Second leg	Manchester United (England)	2–1 (2–1 agg.)	(Socialist Federal Republic of Yugoslavia) Sarajevo	Manchester, England
19:45 GMT (UTC+0)	Aston 10'; Best 63'	Report	Delalić 87'	Stadium: Old Trafford; Attendance: 62,801; Referee: Roger Mâchin (France)
