= 1966–67 Yugoslav Cup =

1967 Yugoslav Football Cup
20th Marshal Tito Cup
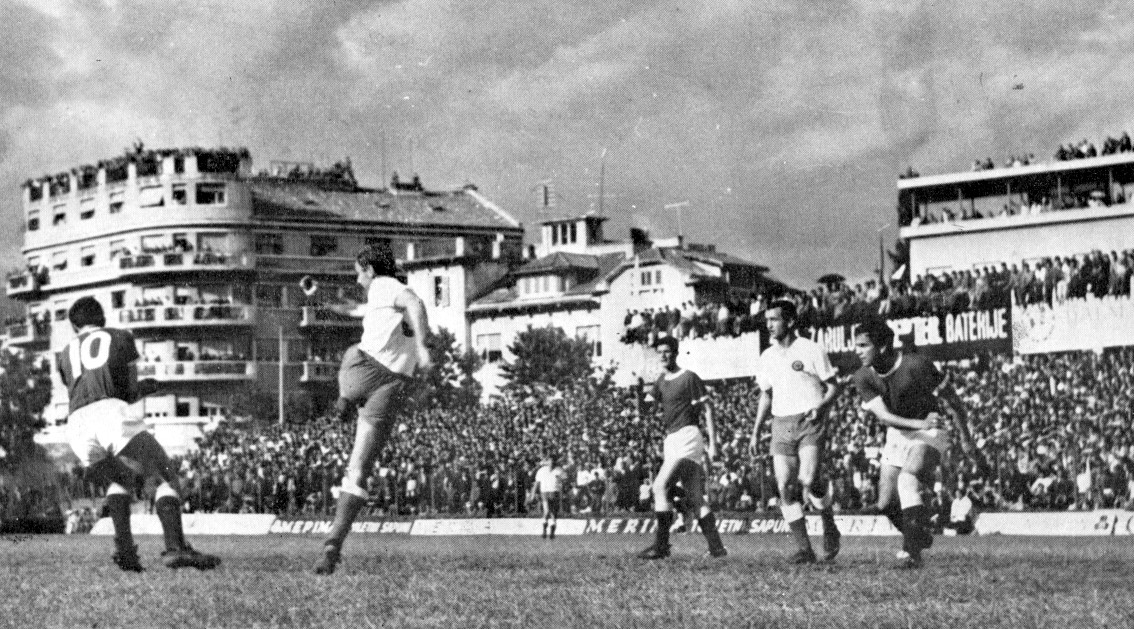
- Cup final, played in Split

Tournament details
- Country: Yugoslavia
- Dates: 25 February – 24 May
- Teams: 16

Final positions
- Champions: Hajduk Split (1st title)
- Runners-up: Sarajevo
- Cup Winners' Cup: Hajduk Split

Tournament statistics
- Matches played: 15
- Goals scored: 31 (2.07 per match)
- Goals scored in penalty shoot-outs not included.

The 1966–67 Yugoslav Cup was the 20th season of the top football knockout competition in SFR Yugoslavia, the Yugoslav Cup (Serbo-Croatian: Kup Jugoslavije), also known as the "Marshal Tito's Cup" (Kup Maršala Tita), since its establishment in 1946.

According to official statistics, 2,335 teams entered a series of lower-level qualifiers to reach the tournament proper, which was played from late February to late May 1967, as single-legged ties.

The final was reached by top-level teams Hajduk Split and Sarajevo. For Hajduk, this was their fourth final, having lost their previous three (1953, 1955, 1963). For Sarajevo this was their first ever cup final, and a chance to complete the domestic double, as they won the 1966–67 Federal League a month later.

== First round proper ==
In the following tables winning teams are marked in bold; teams from outside top level are indicated with Roman numerals, corresponding to their league.

Tie no	Home team	Score	Away team
1	Dinamo Zagreb	0–1	**Sarajevo**
2	**Hajduk Split**	1–0	Borovo (II)
3	Rijeka	1–1 (4–5 p)	**Red Star**
4	OFK Beograd	1–2	**Vardar**
5	OFK Titograd (III)	1–3	**Željezničar**
6	**Partizan**	2–0	Maribor (II)
7	Proleter Zrenjanin (II)	2–1	Radnički Niš
8	Radnički Belgrade (II)	1–3	Napredak Kruševac (III)

== Quarter-finals ==
Tie no	Home team	Score	Away team
1	**Partizan**	2–1	Proleter Zrenjanin (II)
2	**Sarajevo**	2–0	Napredak Kruševac (III)
3	**Vardar**	1–0	Red Star
4	Željezničar	0–1	**Hajduk Split**

== Semi-finals ==
Tie no	Home team	Score	Away team
1	**Hajduk Split**	0–0 (4–2 p)	Vardar
2	**Sarajevo**	1–0	Partizan

== Final ==
24 May 1967

Hajduk Split	2–1	Sarajevo
Ferić 43'; Obradov 52'		Musemić 74'

Stadion pod Marjanom, Split
Attendance: 15,000
Referee: Lado Jakše (Ljubljana)

HAJDUK SPLIT:
GK	1	(Socialist Federal Republic of Yugoslavia) Radomir Vukčević
DF	2	(Socialist Federal Republic of Yugoslavia) Milutin Folić
DF	3	(Socialist Federal Republic of Yugoslavia) Aleksandar Ristić
DF	4	(Socialist Federal Republic of Yugoslavia) Dragan Slišković
DF	5	(Socialist Federal Republic of Yugoslavia) Vinko Cuzzi (c)
MF	6	(Socialist Federal Republic of Yugoslavia) Miroslav Bošković
FW	7	(Socialist Federal Republic of Yugoslavia) Džemaludin Mušović
MF	8	(Socialist Federal Republic of Yugoslavia) Petar Nadoveza
FW	9	(Socialist Federal Republic of Yugoslavia) Miroslav Ferić
MF	10	(Socialist Federal Republic of Yugoslavia) Ivan Hlevnjak
FW	11	(Socialist Federal Republic of Yugoslavia) Zlatomir Obradov
Manager:
(Socialist Federal Republic of Yugoslavia) Dušan Nenković

SARAJEVO:
GK	1	(Socialist Federal Republic of Yugoslavia) Ibrahim Sirćo
DF	2	(Socialist Federal Republic of Yugoslavia) Mirsad Fazlagić
DF	3	(Socialist Federal Republic of Yugoslavia) Fuad Muzurović
DF	4	(Socialist Federal Republic of Yugoslavia) Sead Jesenković
DF	5	(Socialist Federal Republic of Yugoslavia) Milenko Bajić
MF	6	(Socialist Federal Republic of Yugoslavia) Fahrudin Prljača
MF	7	(Socialist Federal Republic of Yugoslavia) Boško Prodanović
MF	8	(Socialist Federal Republic of Yugoslavia) Sreten Šiljkut
FW	9	(Socialist Federal Republic of Yugoslavia) Vahidin Musemić
FW	10	(Socialist Federal Republic of Yugoslavia) Boško Antić
FW	11	(Socialist Federal Republic of Yugoslavia) Anton Mandić
Manager:
(Socialist Federal Republic of Yugoslavia) Miroslav Brozović

== See also ==
- 1966–67 Yugoslav First League
- 1966–67 Yugoslav Second League
