= 1966–67 NK Hajduk Split season =

Hajduk Split
1966–67 season
- Chairman: Josip Grubelić
- Manager: Dušan Nenković
- First League: 7th
- Yugoslav Cup: Winners
- Top goalscorer: League: Zlatomir Obradov (7); All: Miroslav Ferić (10)

The 1966–67 season was the 56th season in Hajduk Split’s history and their 21st in the Yugoslav First League. Their 13th place finish in the 1965–66 season meant it was their 21st successive season playing in the Yugoslav First League.

== Competitions ==
=== Overall ===
Competition	Started round	Final result	First match	Last Match
1966–67 Yugoslav First League	–	7th	21 August	2 July
1966–67 Yugoslav Cup	First round	Winners	4 August	24 May

=== Yugoslav First League ===
==== Classification ====
Pos	Team	Pld	W	D	L	GF	GA	GD	Pts	Qualification or relegation
5	Red Star Belgrade	30	12	8	10	53	46	+7	32	Invitation for Mitropa Cup
6	Željezničar	30	14	4	12	43	42	+1	32	Invitation for Mitropa Cup
7	Hajduk Split	30	12	7	11	43	28	+15	31	Qualification for Cup Winners' Cup first round
8	Vardar	30	13	5	12	41	44	−3	31	Invitation for Mitropa Cup
9	Radnički Niš	30	13	4	13	32	35	−3	30	

Source: rsssf.org
Rules for classification: 1) points; 2) goal difference; 3) number of goals scored.

== Matches ==
=== Yugoslav First League ===
Round	Date	Venue	Opponent	Score	Hajduk Scorers
1	21 Aug	A	NK Zagreb	1 – 1	Slišković
2	28 Aug	H	Radnički Niš	0 – 1	
3	4 Sep	A	Rijeka	2 – 0	Mušović (2)
4	11 Sep	H	Sarajevo	0 – 1	
5	24 Sep	A	Red Star	2 – 2	Hlevnjak, Nadoveza
6	2 Oct	HR	OFK Beograd	4 – 1	Nadoveza (2), Hlevnjak, Ivković
7	9 Oct	A	Vojvodina	0 – 1	
8	16 Oct	H	Vardar	6 – 0	Matijanić (2), Hlevnjak (2), Ferić, Slišković
9	23 Oct	A	Dinamo Zagreb	1 – 1	Obradov
10	30 Oct	H	Čelik Zenica	3 – 0	Slišković (2), Matijanić
11	13 Nov	A	Sutjeska	1 – 1	Matijanić
12	20 Nov	H	Željezničar	2 – 3	Matijanić, own goal
13	27 Nov	A	Partizan	0 – 1	
14	4 Dec	A	Velež	2 – 1	Ristić, Obradov
15	11 Dec	H	Olimpija	2 – 1	Tomić, Ivković
16	5 Mar	H	NK Zagreb	2 – 1	Nadoveza, Matijanić
17	12 Mar	AR	Radnički Niš	0 – 1	
18	19 Mar	H	Rijeka	1 – 0	Hlevnjak
19	26 Mar	A	Sarajevo	0 – 0	
20	2 Apr	H	Red Star	1 – 0	Nadoveza
21	9 Apr	A	OFK Beograd	0 – 0	
22	16 Apr	H	Vojvodina	1 – 2	Mušović
23	7 May	A	Vardar	0 – 2	
24	21 May	H	Dinamo Zagreb	0 – 0	
25	28 May	A	Čelik	0 – 1	
26	4 Jun	H	Sutjeska	5 – 1	Ferić (2), Begović, Hlevnjak, Mušović
27	11 Jun	A	Željezničar	1 – 3	Nadoveza
28	18 Jun	H	Partizan	2 – 1	Obradov, Ristić
29	25 Jun	H	Velež	4 – 1	Obradov (4)
30	2 Jul	A	Olimpija	0 – 1	

Sources: hajduk.hr

=== Yugoslav Cup ===
Round	Date	Venue	Opponent	Score	Hajduk Scorers
R1	4 Aug	A	Metalac Zadar	9 – 1	Mušović (2), Hlevnjak (2), Pavin (o.g.), Ivković, Ferić (3)
R2	16 Nov	A	Dinara	3 – 2	Ferić (2), Ristić
R3	23 Nov	H	Šibenik	3 – 2	Ivković, Nadoveza, Kovačić
R4	26 Feb	H	Borovo	1 – 0	Ferić
QF	22 Mar	A	Željezničar	1 – 0	Mušović
SF	5 Apr	H	Vardar	0 – 0 (5 – 2 p)	
Final	24 May	H	Sarajevo	2 – 1	Ferić, Obradov

Sources: hajduk.hr

== Player seasonal records ==
=== Top scorers ===
Rank	Name	League	Cup	Total
1	(Socialist Federal Republic of Yugoslavia) Miroslav Ferić	3	7	10
2	(Socialist Federal Republic of Yugoslavia) Zlatomir Obradov	7	1	8
3	(Socialist Federal Republic of Yugoslavia) Ivan Hlevnjak	6	2	8
4	(Socialist Federal Republic of Yugoslavia) Džemaludin Mušović	4	3	8
4	(Socialist Federal Republic of Yugoslavia) Petar Nadoveza	6	1	7
6	(Socialist Federal Republic of Yugoslavia) Mladen Matijanić	6	–	6
7	(Socialist Federal Republic of Yugoslavia) Ante Ivković	2	2	4
7	(Socialist Federal Republic of Yugoslavia) Dragan Slišković	4	–	4
9	(Socialist Federal Republic of Yugoslavia) Aleksandar Ristić	2	1	3
10	(Socialist Federal Republic of Yugoslavia) Vinko Begović	1	–	1
10	(Socialist Federal Republic of Yugoslavia) Marin Kovačić	–	1	1
10	(Socialist Federal Republic of Yugoslavia) Novak Tomić	1	–	1
	Own goals	1	1	2
TOTALS		43	19	62

Source: Competitive matches

== See also ==
- 1966–67 Yugoslav First League
- 1966–67 Yugoslav Cup

== External sources ==
- 1966–67 Yugoslav First League at rsssf.com
- 1966–67 Yugoslav Cup at rsssf.com
- 1966–67 Yugoslav First League at historical-lineups.com
