= Musemić =

Musemić is a Bosnian surname. Notable people with the surname include:

- Husref Musemić (born 1961), Bosnian footballer and manager
- Vahidin Musemić (1946–2023), Bosnian footballer
