= Aladin Šišić =

Bosnian footballer

Personal information
- Date of birth: 28 September 1991 (age 35)
- Place of birth: Cazin, SFR Yugoslavia
- Height: 1.80 m (5 ft 11 in)
- Position: Midfielder

Team information
- Current team: Olimpik
- Number: 77

Youth career
- –2009: Krajina Cazin

Senior career*
Years	Team	Apps	(Gls)
2009–2012	Krajina Cazin		
2012	Staad		
2013–2014	Tallina Kalev	31	(8)
2014–2016	Domžale	44	(4)
2016–2018	Mladost Doboj Kakanj	42	(7)
2018–2020	Sarajevo	22	(1)
2020–	Olimpik	26	(3)

International career
2009	Bosnia and Herzegovina U19	1	(0)
- * Club domestic league appearances and goals as of 15 May 2021

Aladin Šišić (born 28 September 1991) is a Bosnian professional footballer who plays as a midfielder for Bosnian Premier League club Olimpik.

== Club career ==
After spells in Switzerland, Estonia and Slovenia, he joined Bosnian giants FK Sarajevo in summer 2018 on a free from Mladost Doboj Kakanj, but was released after his contract expired after a season. He then joined Olimpik in summer 2020.

== Honours ==
Sarajevo

- Bosnian Premier League: 2018–19, 2019–20
- Bosnian Cup: 2018–19

== See also ==
- List of FK Sarajevo players
