= Muhidin Čoralić =

Bosnian-Herzegovinian footballer

Personal information
- Date of birth: 30 May 1968 (age 57)
- Place of birth: Janja, SFR Yugoslavia
- Height: 1.78 m (5 ft 10 in)
- Position: Midfielder

Senior career*
Years	Team	Apps	(Gls)
- Podrinje Janja
1986–1987	FK Sarajevo	3	(0)
1989–1990	Zemun	21	(0)
1991	Bor	13	(1)
1991–1992	Zemun		
1992–1995	Alemannia Aachen	37	(4)
1995–1996	SC Jülich 1910		
1996–1998	Bonner SC	43	(8)
- * Club domestic league appearances and goals

Muhidin Čoralić (born 30 May 1968) is a retired Bosnian-Herzegovinian football player and is now living in the west of Germany with his wife and three children.

== Club career ==
After beginning his career with FK Sarajevo, he moved to FK Zemun where, accepting the loan in 1990-91 to FK Bor, he stayed until 1993. It was then that he moved to Germany where he signed with Alemannia Aachen where he played until 1995. Before retiring, he also played with lower league German clubs SC Jülich 1910 and Bonner SC.
