= Dragan Slišković =

Yugoslav footballer

Personal information
- Full name: Dragomir Slišković
- Date of birth: 21 January 1942
- Place of birth: Belgrade, Former Republic of Yugoslavia
- Date of death: 31 July 2009 (aged 67)
- Place of death: Split, Croatia
- Position: Midfielder

Youth career
- 1954–1961: Partizan

Senior career*
| Years | Team | Apps | (Gls) |
| 1961–1964 | Partizan | 16 | (1) |
| 1964–1970 | Hajduk Split | 245 | (45) |
| 1971–1974 | FC Liège | | |
| 1974–1976 | Tilleur | | |

Managerial career
- Libreville
- Gabon
- * Club domestic league appearances and goals

Dragomir "Dragan" Slišković (21 January 1942 – 31 July 2009) was a Yugoslav footballer who played as midfielder.

== Playing career ==
=== Club career ===
Nicknamed Slišo, Slišković started his career as an 11 years old in the football school of Partizan, Belgrade. That generation of youth in Partizan won the Cup of Yugoslavia twice. With the first team, he won the Cup of Yugoslavia in seasons 1960/61, 61/62 as well as 1962/63. In 1964, he was invited to join Hajduk – Split at the time when it was at the very bottom of the Yugoslav league. With the golden generation of Hajduk Split he won the 1967 Yugoslav Cup. He was a highly technical player with 'Filigran' dribbling skills. His foot size 38 was a curiosity.

After several successful years in Belgium with RFC Liège and Tilleur, he returned to Hajduk as a scout and coach for the Hajduk Youth Academy. For 30 years, he brought to fame generations of exceptional players like Alen Bokšić, Slaven Bilić, Aljoša Asanović, etc. He also excelled as the coach of Libreville, Gabon as well as the selector of the Gabon national football team.

== Honours ==
Hajduk Split

- Yugoslav Cup: 1966–67
