= 1966–67 Yugoslav First League =

Prva savezna liga
- Season: 1966–67
- Dates: 21 August 1966 – 2 July 1967
- Champions: Sarajevo (1st title)
- Relegated: Sutjeska; Čelik
- European Cup: Sarajevo
- Cup Winners' Cup: Hajduk Split
- Inter-Cities Fairs Cup: Dinamo Zagreb; Partizan; Vojvodina
- Top goalscorer: Mustafa Hasanagić (18)

The 1966–67 Yugoslav First League season was the 21st season of the First Federal League (Serbo-Croatian: Prva savezna liga), the top level association football league of SFR Yugoslavia, since its establishment in 1946. Sixteen teams contested the competition, with Sarajevo winning their first national title.

== Teams ==
At the end of the previous season Radnički Belgrade and NK Trešnjevka were relegated. They were replaced by Sutjeska and Čelik.

Team	Location	Federal Republic	Position in 1965–66
Čelik	Zenica	SR Bosnia and Herzegovina	—
Dinamo Zagreb	Zagreb	SR Croatia	2nd
Hajduk Split	Split	SR Croatia	13th
OFK Belgrade	Belgrade	SR Serbia	6th
Olimpija	Ljubljana	SR Slovenia	8th
Partizan	Belgrade	SR Serbia	11th
Radnički Niš	Niš	SR Serbia	7th
Red Star	Belgrade	SR Serbia	5th
Rijeka	Rijeka	SR Croatia	4th
Sarajevo	Sarajevo	SR Bosnia and Herzegovina	9th
Sutjeska	Nikšić	SR Montenegro	—
Vardar	Skopje	SR Macedonia	10th
Velež	Mostar	SR Bosnia and Herzegovina	3rd
Vojvodina	Novi Sad	SR Serbia	1st
NK Zagreb	Zagreb	SR Croatia	14th
Željezničar	Sarajevo	SR Bosnia and Herzegovina	12th

== League table ==
Pos	Team	Pld	W	D	L	GF	GA	GD	Pts	Qualification or relegation
1	Sarajevo (C)	30	18	6	6	51	29	+22	42	Qualification for European Cup first round
2	Dinamo Zagreb	30	15	10	5	42	21	+21	40	Invitation for Inter-Cities Fairs Cup first round
3	Partizan	30	14	10	6	52	28	+24	38	Invitation for Inter-Cities Fairs Cup first round
4	Vojvodina	30	12	9	9	40	39	+1	33	Invitation for Inter-Cities Fairs Cup first round
5	Red Star Belgrade	30	12	8	10	53	46	+7	32	Invitation for Mitropa Cup
6	Željezničar	30	14	4	12	43	42	+1	32	Invitation for Mitropa Cup
7	Hajduk Split	30	12	7	11	43	28	+15	31	Qualification for Cup Winners' Cup first round
8	Vardar	30	13	5	12	41	44	−3	31	Invitation for Mitropa Cup
9	Radnički Niš	30	13	4	13	32	35	−3	30	
10	Velež	30	9	10	11	35	41	−6	28	
11	Rijeka	30	9	9	12	37	39	−2	27	
12	NK Zagreb	30	10	7	13	34	48	−14	27	
13	OFK Belgrade	30	8	7	15	36	37	−1	23	
14	Olimpija	30	9	5	16	33	47	−14	23	Invitation for Balkans Cup
15	Sutjeska Nikšić (R)	30	8	6	16	30	58	−28	22	Relegation to Yugoslav Second League
16	Čelik (Note: Čelik were docked 4 points.) (R)	30	7	7	16	20	40	−20	17	Relegation to Yugoslav Second League

Source: rsssf.org
Rules for classification: 1) points; 2) goal difference; 3) number of goals scored.
(C) Champions; (R) Relegated

== Results ==
Home \ Away	ČEL	DIN	HAJ	OFK	OLI	PAR	RNI	RSB	RIJ	SAR	SUT	VAR	VEL	VOJ	ZAG	ŽEL
Čelik		0–0	1–0	2–1	0–1	0–1	1–0	0–1	0–0	1–3	0–0	0–1	1–1	2–0	1–0	2–2
Dinamo Zagreb	2–2		1–1	1–0	3–1	3–1	1–0	2–1	3–1	0–0	3–0	2–0	1–1	0–2	3–1	0–0
Hajduk Split	3–0	0–0		4–1	2–1	2–1	0–1	1–0	1–0	0–1	5–1	6–0	4–1	1–2	2–1	2–3
OFK Belgrade	2–0	0–0	0–0		0–0	1–1	0–1	0–2	4–2	3–1	1–1	4–1	2–0	2–0	1–2	4–0
Olimpija	1–0	2–1	1–0	2–2		0–1	1–1	0–1	0–2	1–2	3–0	2–0	2–0	2–2	2–0	3–2
Partizan	4–0	0–0	1–0	1–0	4–1		5–1	1–1	1–0	2–1	4–1	1–1	1–1	0–1	7–0	1–0
Radnički Niš	1–0	0–1	1–0	1–0	3–0	0–0		3–1	1–0	1–0	1–0	1–2	2–0	4–1	1–3	1–1
Red Star	3–2	0–1	2–2	1–1	5–1	3–2	2–3		2–2	1–3	2–2	3–2	2–0	2–0	3–1	2–3
Rijeka	2–0	3–2	0–2	3–1	0–0	1–1	3–1	2–1		0–4	2–0	2–2	1–2	5–1	1–1	2–0
Sarajevo	5–2	1–1	0–0	3–1	2–1	1–1	1–0	1–0	2–0		1–0	2–1	1–1	3–1	2–3	2–0
Sutjeska	0–1	0–5	1–1	1–0	2–1	2–2	4–1	2–3	2–1	2–3		1–0	1–0	1–5	2–1	2–1
Vardar	0–1	0–1	1–0	3–1	2–1	4–2	3–1	3–2	0–0	1–1	4–0		1–1	2–1	1–0	2–0
Velež	3–0	0–1	1–2	0–3	3–1	1–1	1–0	1–1	2–1	1–0	0–0	3–0		5–3	1–1	1–0
Vojvodina	1–1	2–0	1–0	1–0	1–0	0–1	0–0	2–2	1–1	4–2	2–0	3–1	1–1		1–1	0–0
NK Zagreb	1–0	0–3	1–1	1–0	3–2	2–1	2–1	0–0	0–0	0–1	2–1	1–3	3–2	0–0		2–3
Željezničar	1–0	2–1	3–1	2–1	3–0	0–3	2–0	3–4	2–0	0–2	3–1	1–0	4–1	0–1	2–1	

Source: DataSoccer.it
Legend: Blue = home team win; Yellow = draw; Red = away team win.

== Winning squad ==
Champions: FK Sarajevo
Player	League	
Player	Matches	Goals
Boško Antić	30	14
Milenko Bajić	30	0
Mirsad Fazlagić	30	0
Fahrudin Prljača	29	5
Sead Jesenković	29	0
Boško Prodanović	28	10
Vahidin Musemić	25	16
Sreten Šiljkut	25	3
Ibrahim Sirćo (goalkeeper)	25	0
Fuad Muzurović	23	0
Stjepan Blažević	20	0
Ibrahim Biogradlić (Note: played only the fall part of the season)	15	0
Dragan Vujanović	9	1
Asim Ferhatović (Note: retired from playing football during the first part of the season at the age of 33)	8	0
Refik Muftić (goalkeeper) (Note: went to serve the mandatory army stint shortly after the season began)	5	0
Sreten Dilberović	4	0
Anton Mandić	3	0
Svetozar Vujović (Note: went to serve the mandatory army stint shortly after the season began)	2	0
Osman Maglajlija	1	0
Miodrag Makić	1	0
Head coach: Miroslav Brozović

== Top scorers ==
Rank	Player	Club	Goals
1	(Socialist Federal Republic of Yugoslavia) Mustafa Hasanagić	Partizan	18
2	(Socialist Federal Republic of Yugoslavia) Josip Bukal	Željezničar	17
3	(Socialist Federal Republic of Yugoslavia) Vahidin Musemić	Sarajevo	16
4	(Socialist Federal Republic of Yugoslavia) Vojin Lazarević	Red Star	15
5	(Socialist Federal Republic of Yugoslavia) Boško Antić	Sarajevo	14
6	(Socialist Federal Republic of Yugoslavia) Slaven Zambata	Dinamo Zagreb	13
6	(Socialist Federal Republic of Yugoslavia) Dragan Džajić	Red Star	13
8	(Socialist Federal Republic of Yugoslavia) Slobodan Santrač	OFK Belgrade	12

== See also ==
- 1966–67 Yugoslav Second League
- 1966–67 Yugoslav Cup
