= Dragan Vujanović =

Yugoslav footballer

Personal information
- Date of birth: 9 July 1946 (age 80)
- Place of birth: Banja Luka, FPR Yugoslavia
- Position: Midfielder

Youth career
- Sloboda Novi Grad

Senior career*
Years	Team	Apps	(Gls)
1959–1962	Radnički Prijedor	41	(27)
1962–1965	Sloboda Novi Grad	25	(16)
1965–1969	Sarajevo	38	(4)
1970–1980	Sloboda Novi Grad	191	(49)
Total		295	(96)
- * Club domestic league appearances and goals

Dragan Vujanović (Serbian Cyrillic: Драган Вујановић; 9 July 1946) is a Yugoslav and Bosnian retired footballer who played as a midfielder and occasional forward. He was a member of the 1966–67 Yugoslav First League title winning FK Sarajevo squad.

== Honours ==
Sarajevo

- Yugoslav First League: 1966–67
