= Salih Delalić =

Bosnian footballer (1948–2002)

27th President of the Assembly of FK Sarajevo
- In office 2001 – 26 October 2002
- Preceded by: Besim Mehmedić
- Succeeded by: Muhamed Šačiragić

Personal details
- Born: 21 July 1948 Živinice, SR Bosnia and Herzegovina, SFR Yugoslavia
- Died: 26 October 2002 (aged 54) Sarajevo, Bosnia and Herzegovina
- Occupation: Footballer, football administrator, engineer
Association football career
- Full name: Salih Delalić
- Position: Midfielder
Youth career
- –1966: Slaven Živinice
Senior career*
| Years | Team | Apps | (Gls) |
| 1966 | Slaven Živinice | 31 | (11) |
| 1967–1971 | Sarajevo | 106 | (18) |
| Total | | 137 | (29) |
- * Club domestic league appearances and goals

Salih Delalić (21 July 1948 – 26 October 2002) was a Bosnian professional footballer, engineer and football administrator.

== Career ==
Delalić started his professional career with his hometown side Slaven Živinice in 1966, before transferring to Sarajevo one year later. Delalić was a member of the first Sarajevo championship winning generation that clinched the Yugoslav First League title in the 1966–67 season and that was narrowly defeated by Manchester United in the second round of the 1967–68 European Cup. A 0–0 draw in the first leg at the Koševo City Stadium was followed by a 2–1 defeat in Manchester, yet Delalić made history by scoring Sarajevo's goal that night, becoming the first player from the former Yugoslavia to score at Old Trafford.

== Personal life and death ==
After retiring from professional football, he enjoyed a successful career as an engineer. In 2001, Delalić was elected as the 27th President of the Assembly of his former club Sarajevo, a position he held on to until his sudden and unexpected death on 26 October 2002.

Delalić died unexpectedly in his hometown of Sarajevo, Bosnia and Herzegovina on 26 October 2002, at the age of 54.

== Honours ==
=== Player ===
Sarajevo

- Yugoslav First League: 1966–67
