= 1966–67 Mitropa Cup =

Tournament details
- Dates: November 1966 – June 1967
- Teams: 16

Final positions
- Champions: (Czechoslovakia) Spartak Trnava (1st title)
- Runners-up: (Hungary) Újpesti Dózsa

Tournament statistics
- Matches played: 30
- Goals scored: 90 (3 per match)

The 1966–67 Mitropa Cup was the 27th season of the Mitropa football club tournament. It was won by Spartak Trnava who beat Újpesti Dózsa in the two-legged final 5–4 on aggregate.

== Round of 16 ==
Matches played between 9 November and 8 December 1966.

| Team 1 | Agg. | Team 2 | 1st leg | 2nd leg |
|---|---|---|---|---|
| Lazio (Italy) | 4–2 | (Socialist Federal Republic of Yugoslavia) Red Star Belgrade | 3–0 | 1–2 |
| Cagliari (Italy) | 3–4 | (Socialist Federal Republic of Yugoslavia) Sarajevo | 2–1 | 1–3 |
| Budapest Honvéd (Hungary) | 1–5 | (Czechoslovakia) Spartak Trnava | 1–1 | 0–4 |
| First Vienna FC (Austria) | 5–6 | (Italy) Fiorentina | 4–3 | 1–3 |
| Slavia Prague (Czechoslovakia) | 1–4 | Austria Wien | 1–2 | 0–2 |
| Dinamo Zagreb (Socialist Federal Republic of Yugoslavia) | 1–0 | (Italy) Milan | 1–0 | 0–0 |
| Újpesti Dózsa (Hungary) | 6–2 | (Czechoslovakia) Slovan Bratislava | 5–1 | 1–1 |
| Tatabánya (Hungary) | 3–1 | (Austria) Wacker Innsbruck | 1–0 | 2–1 |

== Quarter-finals ==
Matches played between 15 and 30 March 1967.

| Team 1 | Agg. | Team 2 | 1st leg | 2nd leg |
|---|---|---|---|---|
| Dinamo Zagreb (Socialist Federal Republic of Yugoslavia) | 3–4 | Austria Wien | 3–3 | 0–1 |
| Tatabánya (Hungary) | 1–2 | (Italy) Fiorentina | 1–1 | 0–1 |
| Lazio (Italy) | 1–2 | (Czechoslovakia) Spartak Trnava | 1–1 | 0–1 |
| Sarajevo (Socialist Federal Republic of Yugoslavia) | 2–7 | (Hungary) Újpesti Dózsa | 1–2 | 1–5 |

== Semi-finals ==
The first legs were played on 27 April, and the second legs were played on 10 May 1967.

| Team 1 | Agg. | Team 2 | 1st leg | 2nd leg |
|---|---|---|---|---|
| Spartak Trnava (Czechoslovakia) | 3–2 | (Italy) Fiorentina | 2–0 | 1–2 |
| Újpesti Dózsa (Hungary) | 5–1 | Austria Wien | 3–0 | 2–1 |

== Final ==
| Team 1 | Agg. | Team 2 | 1st leg | 2nd leg |
|---|---|---|---|---|
| Újpesti Dózsa (Hungary) | 4–5 | (Czechoslovakia) Spartak Trnava | 3–2 | 1–3 |

== See also ==
- 1966–67 European Cup
- 1966–67 European Cup Winners' Cup
- 1966–67 Inter-Cities Fairs Cup
- 1966–67 Balkans Cup
