= Mile Perković =

11th President of the Assembly of FK Sarajevo
- In office 1964–1967
- Preceded by: Ljubo Kojo
- Succeeded by: Milivoje Šteković

Personal details
- Born: 11 September 1920 Duvno, Kingdom of Yugoslavia
- Died: 2 October 2013 (aged 93) Sarajevo, Bosnia and Herzegovina
- Profession: Economist, Sports administrator

Mile Perković (11 September 1920 – 2 October 2013) was a notable Yugoslav Partisan, economist and sports administrator. He was FK Sarajevo president of the assembly when the club won its first Yugoslav First League title in 1967.

Before serving as the president, Mile Perković was the vice president of the club from 1961 to 1962. After the expiration of that mandate, Perković served as the president of the club for five years, from 1962 to 1967. In his distinguished sports career, Mile Perković managed to win the Yugoslav championship title with Sarajevo in 1967. He was awarded the May Prize by the Sports and Culture Community (SOFK) of the city of Sarajevo. Additionally, he received the silver plaque from the Football Association of Yugoslavia in 1969, and the badge from the Football Association of Bosnia and Herzegovina in 1978. In 1965 he received the City of Sarajevo commemorative plaque.
