= Juninho Botelho =

Brazilian footballer (born 1987)

Personal information
- Full name: José Francisco da Silva Botelho Júnior
- Date of birth: 19 January 1987 (age 39)
- Place of birth: Porto Alegre, Brazil
- Height: 1.88 m (6 ft 2 in)
- Position: Midfielder

Team information
- Current team: Juventude

Youth career
- 2003–2006: Grêmio

Senior career*
| Years | Team | Apps | (Gls) |
| 2007–2009 | Grêmio | 0 | (0) |
| 2007 | → Guarani (VA) (loan) | 0 | (0) |
| 2008 | → Esportivo (loan) | 0 | (0) |
| 2008 | → Metropolitano (loan) | 3 | (0) |
| 2008 | → Ulbra (loan) | 0 | (0) |
| 2009 | → Esportivo (loan) | 0 | (0) |
| 2009 | Canoas (amateur) | 0 | (0) |
| 2010 | Itumbiara | 0 | (0) |
| 2010 | Ituiutaba | 0 | (0) |
| 2010 | FK Sarajevo | 1 | (0) |
| 2011 | Cruzeiro (PA) | 8 | (1) |
| 2011– | Juventude | | |
- * Club domestic league appearances and goals

José Francisco da Silva Botelho Jr. (literally little Júnior), known as Juninho, or Juninho Botelho, (born 19 January 1987) is a Brazilian footballer who plays as a midfielder for Juventude.

== Career ==
=== Grêmio ===
Juninho Botelho signed his first contract with Grêmio in June 2003. He renewed his contract on 1 January 2006. He also played for the under-20 team at 2006 Copa FGF, a state-wise senior event. In January 2007, he was loaned to Esporte Clube Guarani of Venâncio Aires. The team finished as the 8th of Group B of 2007 Campeonato Gaúcho and relegated. The club had two grest defeat that season, losing to Grêmio and São José (PA) in 0–4. In April he returned to the youth team of Grêmio and played in 2007 Copa FGF. In January 2008 he was loaned to Esportivo and in June left for Metropolitano. and played in 2008 Campeonato Brasileiro Série C. In August he returned to Rio Grande do Sul, signed a contract with Ulbra for 2008 Copa FGF. In January 2009 he was re-signed by Esportivo. He then released by Grêmio and left for amateur side Canoas .

=== Itumbiara & Ituiutaba ===
In January 2010 he left for Itumbiara of Campeonato Goiano. in February he was signed by Ituiutaba and finished as the bottom of Campeonato Mineiro.

=== Sarajevo & Cruzeiro (PA) ===
In August 2010 he was signed by Bosnia and Herzegovina club FK Sarajevo. he made his cup debut in BiH Cup.

In January 2011 he left for Cruzeiro de Porto Alegre until the end of 2011 Campeonato Gaúcho. He made his club debut on 19 February 2011, a 1–1 draw with Internacional as substitute.

== Honours ==
- Copa FGF: 2006 (Grêmio under-20)
