= Boris Jordanovski =

Yugoslav/Macedonian footballer

Personal information
- Full name: Boris Jordanovski
- Date of birth: September 11, 1922
- Place of birth: Skopje, Kingdom of Serbs, Croats and Slovenes
- Date of death: 9 April 2000 (aged 77)
- Position: Defender

Senior career*
Years	Team	Apps	(Gls)
1946–1947	Pobeda	12	(0)
1947–1949	Sarajevo	12	(2)
1949–1954	Vardar	51	(5)
1954–1956	Rabotnički	26	(0)
- * Club domestic league appearances and goals

Boris "Prelo" Jordanovski (Macedonian: Борис ”Прело” Јордановски) was a Yugoslav and North Macedonian footballer who played as a defender in the immediate post‑World War II era. He is known for representing several clubs, including Pobeda Skopje, FK Vardar, FK Sarajevo, and Rabotnički Skopje.

== Club career ==
Jordanovski emerged as a player for Pobeda Skopje in the immediate post‑war period. In the 1946–47 season, he made at least 12 appearances as a defender for Pobeda in the Macedonian league.

He later played for Vardar Skopje between 1952 and 1956, a period during which the club was competing in the Yugoslav football league system and building its reputation in regional competition.

In addition to his time in Skopje, Jordanovski also played for FK Sarajevo and Rabotnički Skopje in the Yugoslav First League, indicative of the mobility of players in the post‑war Yugoslav leagues.

== Legacy ==
Jordanovski is remembered as part of the early history of club football in the former Yugoslav republics during the post‑World War II reconstruction of the sport.
