= Zlatomir Obradov =

Croatian footballer and coach (1941–2013)

Personal information
- Full name: Zlatomir Obradov
- Date of birth: 25 January 1941
- Place of birth: Bašaid, Kingdom of Yugoslavia
- Date of death: 24 April 2013 (aged 72)
- Place of death: Ploče, Croatia
- Position: Midfielder

Youth career
- 1961–1962: Banat Kikinda

Senior career*
Years	Team	Apps	(Gls)
1962–1966	Proleter Zrenjanin	99	(48)
1966–1969	Hajduk Split	29	(10)
1973	Split		

Managerial career
- 1975: RNK Split
- NK Jadran Ploče
- * Club domestic league appearances and goals

Zlatomir Obradov (25 January 1941 – 24 April 2013) of Macedonian descendants was a Croatian footballer during the 1960s and later coach. He was a midfield player and, if necessary, played in the forwards.

== Playing career ==
In his native village of Bašaid near Kikinda, he played for the local team, then in Kikinda for the Odred and after three years he moved on loan to FK Proleter Zrenjanin, where he was the best player and scorer. In 1966 he was moved to the Hajduk Split and played there for three years. Overall, for Hajduk he played 86 matches and scored 46 goals.

== Coaching career ==
After a playing career as a one time involved with the coaching. In 1975, he was the coach of RNK Split, and later coached the NK Jadran Ploče.

He died in Ploče.

== Honours and awards ==
- Hajduk Split
  - Yugoslav Cup:
    - Winner: 1966–67
