= Anđelko Tešan =

Bosnian footballer

Personal information
- Date of birth: November 21, 1949 (age 76)
- Place of birth: Sarajevo, FPR Yugoslavia
- Position: Defender

Senior career*
Years	Team	Apps	(Gls)
1967–1977	FK Sarajevo	354	(5)
1978–1979	New York Eagles	31	(2)
1980–1981	Columbia Ohio	22	(0)

International career
1968–1970	Yugoslavia	11	(0)
- * Club domestic league appearances and goals

Anđelko Tešan (born 21 November 1949 in Sarajevo, PR Bosnia-Herzegovina, FPR Yugoslavia) is a former Bosnian professional footballer.

== Club career ==
He started his career with FK Sarajevo in 1967, and went on to represent the club for a further ten seasons. He also played for US teams New York Eagles and Columbia Ohio before retiring in 1981.

== International career ==
He made his debut for Yugoslavia in a December 1968 friendly match away against Brazil and has earned a total of 11 caps, scoring no goals. His final international was an October 1970 friendly match against the Soviet Union.
