= Aleksandar Ristić =

Bosnian footballer (born 1944)

Personal information
- Date of birth: 28 June 1944 (age 82)
- Place of birth: Sarajevo, SFR Yugoslavia
- Position: Left winger

Senior career*
Years	Team	Apps	(Gls)
1962–1966	Sarajevo	67	(5)
1966–1970	Hajduk Split	109	(7)
1970–1974	Velež Mostar		
1974–1978	Eintracht Braunschweig	78	(3)
Total		249	(15)

Managerial career
- 1977–1978: Eintracht Braunschweig (youth)
- 1980–1981: Hamburger SV (assistant)
- 1981: Hamburger SV (caretaker)
- 1981–1983: Hamburger SV (assistant)
- 1983–1985: Eintracht Braunschweig
- 1987–1990: Fortuna Düsseldorf
- 1991–1992: Schalke 04
- 1992–1996: Fortuna Düsseldorf
- 1998–2000: Rot-Weiß Oberhausen
- 2000–2001: Fortuna Düsseldorf
- 2002–2003: Rot-Weiß Oberhausen
- 2004: Union Berlin
- 2007–2008: KFC Uerdingen 05
- * Club domestic league appearances and goals as of 9.3.2024.

Aleksandar Ristić (born 28 June 1944) is a Bosnian football manager and former Yugoslav player.

== Playing career ==
Ristić was born in Sarajevo, Yugoslavia. During his playing career he played for the Yugoslav clubs FK Velež Mostar, HNK Hajduk Split, FK Sarajevo and German Bundesliga club Eintracht Braunschweig. While playing with Hajduk Split he won the 1967 Yugoslav Cup.

== Managerial career ==
In 1977, Ristić started his career as manager at Eintracht Braunschweig, where he worked as a youth coach. In 1980, he joined the staff of Hamburger SV. There he started as assistant of Manager Branko Zebec, in 1981 he was caretaker for half a year, until Ernst Happel became manager, and he was again only his assistant. Between 1983 and 1985 he worked almost two years in Braunschweig, where he started his career in Germany.

In 1987, he started in Fortuna Düsseldorf for three and a half years, in January 1991 he went to Schalke 04, but in summer 1992 he re-changed to Fortuna Düsseldorf for another four years. There he was called "King Aleks" for his long-term workplace. His third manager job at Düsseldorf ran from summer 2000 till the end of the year when he again was dismissed for lack of success.

Between 1998 and 2003, Ristić managed Rot-Weiß Oberhausen (except the late summer 2000 in Düsseldorf). In 2004, he got a manager position at Union Berlin, but he stayed there just a few months, because his team was relegated to the third league.

After a pause, he returned to work in 2007 for just one year at KFC Uerdingen 05 in the German Oberliga Nordrhein. He cancelled his contract in March 2008.

== Personal life ==
Ristić lives in Dubrovnik, Croatia.
