= Fahrudin Prljača =

Bosnian-Herzegovinian and Yugoslav footballer

Personal information
- Date of birth: November 3, 1944 (age 81)
- Place of birth: Sarajevo, DF Yugoslavia
- Position: Striker

Youth career
- FK Sarajevo

Senior career*
Years	Team	Apps	(Gls)
1961–1973	FK Sarajevo	387	(79)
1973–1974	Sporting Hasselt	33	(9)
1974–1975	FK Sarajevo	19	(2)
1975–1976	Leotar	14	(0)

International career
1966	Yugoslavia	1	(0)
- * Club domestic league appearances and goals

Fahrudin Prljača (born 3 November 1944) is a Yugoslav and Bosnian retired footballer who played the position of striker.

== Club career ==
He was a member of FK Sarajevo from 1961 to 1973, and again between 1974 and 1975, going on to win the club's first Yugoslav League title in 1967. He also represented Belgian side Sporting Hasselt.

Fahrudin Prljača was born on January 3, 1944, in the small village of Prača on the outskirts of Sarajevo, and was educated and grew up in downtown Sarajevo. He started his football career in the FK Sarajevo youth system, and made his debut for the first team on 22 April 1962, in a league fixture against Velež. Although he still had the right to play for the juniors, Prljača joined the first team, and in the 1963-64 season he became irreplaceable in the starting lineup, making 33 appearances in all competitions, with six goals scored. Although his primary position was center-forward, managers often played him on the left wing. He reached the pinnacle of his career in the 1966-67 season when he won the championship title with Sarajevo. With five goals scored in the title-winning season, he was Sarajevo's fourth most influential player in regards to offense, right behind the attacking trio of Prodanović-Musemić-Antić.

In the following two years, he continued with good performances, becoming the team's top scorer, with 8 goals scored in all competitions, during the 1968-69 season. Then came problems with injuries, due to which he made only 10 official appearances in the next two and a half years, and in January 1972 he was transferred to Belgian outfit Sporting Hasselt, for which he played for two years, only to return to the Koševo Stadium in 1974. This time he stayed for only half a year, after which he moved to Leotar, where he ended his playing career.

He made 238 official appearances for Sarajevo, scoring 44 goals in the process. He made a total of 387 appearances, including friendlies, and scored 79 goals.

== International career ==
He made one appearance for the Yugoslavia national team in 1966 against Bulgaria.
