= Stjepan Blažević =

Yugoslav footballer (1942–2025)

Personal information
- Date of birth: 21 March 1942
- Place of birth: Sisak, Independent State of Croatia
- Date of death: 27 November 2025 (aged 83)
- Position: Attacking midfielder

Youth career
- Jedinstvo Dvor na Uni

Senior career*
Years	Team	Apps	(Gls)
1961–1969	Sarajevo	201	(17)
1969–1971	Borac Banja Luka	33	(8)
1971–1972	Sarajevo	6	(0)
Total		240	(25)
- * Club domestic league appearances and goals

Stjepan Blažević (21 March 1942 – 27 November 2025) was a Yugoslav and Bosnian professional footballer who played as an attacking midfielder. He spent most of his career at Bosnian club Sarajevo, making 207 league appearances for the club. He was a member of the 1966–67 Yugoslav First League title winning squad.

== Career ==
Blažević was born on 21 March 1942 in Sisak, modern-day Croatia, and started playing football for his hometown side Jedinstvo from Dvor na Uni. At 18, in the summer of 1960, he agreed to transfer to Sarajevo. Still, due to an unexpected illness, he had to take a break from football for a year, arriving at the Koševo City Stadium the following summer. In his first season with the club, he made 21 appearances in all official competitions, and in the following season, he had already become a first-team regular.

Although he had the difficult task of succeeding club legend Franjo Lovrić in the position of attacking midfielder and occasional forward, Blažević showed that he was worthy of that role in a match against Dinamo Zagreb in May 1963. The Zagreb outfit were league leaders with five games to go before Blažević knocked them out with two goals.

Blažević was irreplaceable in Sarajevo's midfield until 1969, including the 1966-67 title-winning season. In the summer of 1969, he transferred to Borac Banja Luka, only to return to Sarajevo in 1971, retiring from professional football a year later.

His testimonial was a friendly match against Sporting CP in August 1972.

== Death ==
Blažević died on 27 November 2025, at the age of 83.

== Honours ==
Sarajevo

- Yugoslav First League: 1966–67
