= Ibrahim Sirćo =

Bosnian-Herzegovinian footballer

Personal information
- Full name: Ibrahim Sirćo
- Date of birth: 30 November 1940
- Place of birth: Visoko, Kingdom of Yugoslavia
- Date of death: 27 September 2020 (aged 79)
- Place of death: Visoko, Bosnia and Herzegovina
- Position: Goalkeeper

Youth career
- Bosna Visoko

Senior career*
Years	Team	Apps	(Gls)
1959-1962	Bosna Visoko	33	(0)
1962-1963	Rudar Kakanj	21	(0)
1963-1970	Sarajevo	122	(0)
1970-1971	Željezničar	20	(0)
1971-1972	Jedinstvo Bihać	25	(0)
Total		221	(0)
- * Club domestic league appearances and goals

Ibrahim Sirćo (30 November 1940 – 27 September 2020) was a Yugoslav and Bosnian footballer who played as a goalkeeper. He spent the majority of his career with FK Sarajevo.

== Club career ==
Born in the town of Visoko, Sirćo was a product of the Bosna Visoko youth system. After three seasons with the first team, he transferred to Rudar Kakanj where he spent one season, after which he moved to FK Sarajevo in 1963, quickly establishing himself as the club's reserve goalkeeper. Through time, he fought with Refik Muftić for the position of first goalkeeper, and when Muftić left for his mandatory military service in the fall of 1966, he inherited the number one jersey. By the end of the 1966-67 season, he became irreplaceable in goal, thus leaving his mark in winning the club's first championship title. He made 118 official appearances for the first team of Sarajevo. In 1970 he moved to city rivals Željezničar, before having a short stint with Jedinstvo Bihać.

== Post-playing career ==
From 1971 to 2005, he was a physical education teacher at the Visoko gymnasium, and then at the Mixed School.

== Personal life ==
His older brother Rešad was also a professional footballer. His younger brothers Nevzet and Mirsad were professional handball players.

== Death ==
Sirćo died in Visoko, Bosnia and Herzegovina, on 27 September 2020.

== Honours ==
Sarajevo

- Yugoslav First League: 1966–67
