= Mirsad Fazlagić =

Bosnian footballer (born 1943)

Personal information
- Date of birth: 4 April 1943 (age 83)
- Place of birth: Čapljina, Independent State of Croatia
- Position: Full-back

Youth career
- –1958: Čapljina

Senior career*
Years	Team	Apps	(Gls)
1958–1960	Čapljina	33	(1)
1960–1961	Željezničar	17	(0)
1961–1972	Sarajevo	215	(4)
Total		265	(5)

International career
1963–1968	Yugoslavia	19	(0)

Managerial career
- 1974–1975: Sarajevo
- 1975–1983: Sarajevo (youth team)
- 1983–1986: Sarajevo (assistant)
- 1986–1987: Yugoslavia U20 (assistant)
- 1988: Footscray JUST
- 1989–1990: Anorthosis Famagusta
- Al-Tadhamon
Medal record
Men's Football
Representing Yugoslavia
European Championship
Silver medal – second place	1968 Italy	Team
- * Club domestic league appearances and goals

Mirsad Fazlagić (born 4 April 1943) is a Bosnian retired professional football player and manager. He played as a full-back.

== Club career ==
Fazlagić started his football career in the youth setup of his local hometown team Čapljina in 1957. As a talented seventeen year old, he was acquired by Yugoslav First League side FK Željezničar, where he also made his debut in the top tier of Yugoslav football. After one season with the blues he made a switch to bitter city rivals FK Sarajevo in the summer of 1960. The team led by prolific scorer Asim Ferhatović finished fourth in the league during the 1963–64 season, with Fazlagić establishing himself as the team's starting right-back. Two years later the maroon-whites finished runners-up behind FK Partizan and eventually went on to win the league during the 1966–67 season, with him captaining the outfit. FK Sarajevo was narrowly beaten by Manchester United in the 1967–68 European Cup second round, despite hosting a goalless draw in the first leg. The second leg played at Old Trafford ended in controversy after the ball went out of bounds prior to the hosts scoring the winning goal. After signing a pre-contract with Juventus in the fall of 1971, which would have made him the most expensive defender in history until that point, he suffered a horrendous knee injury and the transfer fell through. After recovering for nearly a year, he was again fielded by then-FK Sarajevo manager Srboljub Markušević. He retired prematurely in 1975 having played 404 matches for FK Sarajevo while finding the back of the net 10 times. His farewell match for the club was against Sporting CP at the Stadium Koševo, a 2–2 draw.

== International career ==
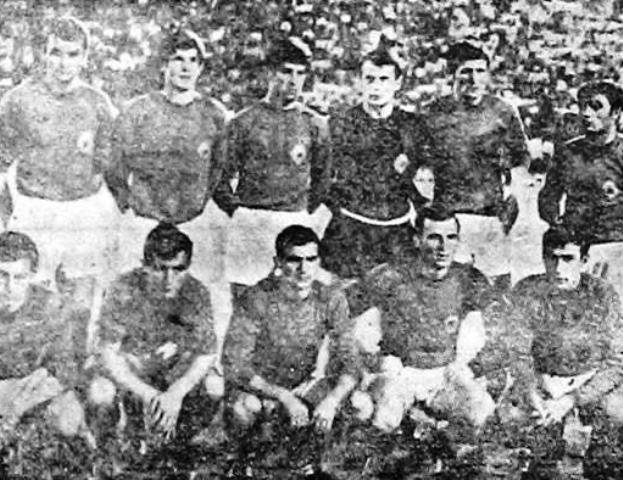
Fazlagić (standing, first from left) with Yugoslavia at UEFA Euro 1968

On the international stage, Fazlagić made 19 appearances for Yugoslavia, earning his first cap in a European Championship qualification match on 31 March 1963 against Belgium (1–0). He is especially known internationally for being the captain of Yugoslavia during the 1968 European Football Championship, where the side took silver after a tight loss to the home team Italy after a two-legged final at the Stadio Olimpico in Rome. He was named part of the tournament's All-star team. He also took part in the 1964 Summer Olympics. His final international was that June 1968 final loss against Italy.

== Managerial career ==
In 1974, Fazlagić was named player-manager of FK Sarajevo, which he led for one season, eventually being transferred to the club's youth department in order to gain more coaching experience. After eight years of managing the youth teams, he was named assistant manager to former club and international teammate Boško Antić. The pair led a talented team of youngsters, including the likes of Faruk Hadžibegić, Husref Musemić, Slaviša Vukičević, Predrag Pašić and Zijad Švrakić, to the Yugoslav First League title in 1985, thus becoming champions both as players and as managers. In 1986, he was named assistant to Mirko Jozić in the Yugoslavia under-20 team, taking the side to the 1987 FIFA World Youth Championship in Chile. The team, fielding many future European stars including Zvonimir Boban, Robert Prosinečki, Davor Šuker and Predrag Mijatović, lifted the trophy. In 1988, he had a brief stint in Melbourne, Australia with Footscray JUST in the National Soccer League. From 1989 to 1990, he also managed Anorthosis Famagusta FC in the Cypriot First Division. With the start of the Bosnian war and the Siege of Sarajevo in 1992, Fazlagić rejoined FK Sarajevo and took part in the club's famous 1993–94 World tour, with the goal of garnering support and international aid for the newly independent state. After the end of the war he worked as a manager in Kuwait.

== Personal life ==
His son-in-law, Mirza Varešanović is a former Bosnia and Herzegovina international player and current manager. His grandsons Mak and Dal Varešanović are professional footballers.

== Honours ==
=== Player ===
Sarajevo

- Yugoslav First League: 1966–67

Yugoslavia

- UEFA European Championship runner-up: 1968

Individual

- UEFA Euro Team of the Tournament: 1968
- FUWO European Team of the Season: 1968

=== As assistant manager ===
Sarajevo

- Yugoslav First League: 1984–85

Yugoslavia Youth

- FIFA World Youth Championship: 1987

== See also ==
- Awarded the Sixth April Award of Sarajevo in 2016.
