= Sead Jesenković =

Bosnian footballer and manager (1943–2023)

Personal information
- Date of birth: 17 February 1943
- Place of birth: Rogatica, Independent State of Croatia (modern-day Bosnia and Herzegovina)
- Date of death: 22 November 2023 (aged 80)
- Place of death: Vogošća, Bosnia and Herzegovina
- Position: Defender

Youth career
- 1952–1961: Sarajevo

Senior career*
Years	Team	Apps	(Gls)
1961–1964	Famos Hrasnica	33	(1)
1964–1971	Sarajevo	161	(1)
1971–1973	Jedinstvo Brčko	22	(0)
Total		216	(2)

Managerial career
- 1977–1986: Sarajevo (youth)
- 1988–1992: Sarajevo (youth)
- 1999: Sarajevo
- 1999: Bosnia and Herzegovina (assistant)
- 2000–2007: Sarajevo (youth)
- * Club domestic league appearances and goals

Sead Jesenković (17 February 1943 – 22 November 2023) was a Bosnian professional football player and manager.

== Playing career ==
Jesenković spent most of his playing career at Bosnian club Sarajevo, making 161 official appearances for the club. He was a member of the 1966–67 Yugoslav First League title winning squad.

== Managerial career ==
After ending his playing career, Jesenković became a football manager, starting out as a coach in the youth team of Sarajevo in 1977; a role he kept for a majority of his coaching career. Along with being a youth coach, Jesenković had short stints as an assistant coach to senior team managers in 1996, 1998, 1999, and 2001, respectively, as well as briefly managing the senior side himself in 1999.

== Death ==
On 22 November 2023, Jesenković died in Vogošća, Bosnia and Herzegovina, at the age of 80.

== Honours ==
=== Player ===
Sarajevo

- Yugoslav First League: 1966–67
