= Asim Ferhatović =

Bosnian footballer (1933–1987)

Personal information
- Date of birth: 24 January 1933
- Place of birth: Sarajevo, Kingdom of Yugoslavia
- Date of death: 23 January 1987 (aged 53)
- Place of death: Sarajevo, SR Bosnia and Herzegovina, SFR Yugoslavia
- Position: Striker

Youth career
- 1945–1948: Vratnik
- 1948–1950: Sarajevo

Senior career*
Years	Team	Apps	(Gls)
1951–1963	Sarajevo	158	(66)
1963	Fenerbahçe	7	(1)
1963–1967	Sarajevo	70	(32)
Total		235	(99)

International career
1961	Yugoslavia	1	(0)
- * Club domestic league appearances and goals

Asim Ferhatović "Hase" (pronounced [ǎsim ferxǎːtoʋitɕ xâ:se]; 24 January 1933 – 23 January 1987) was a Bosnian professional footballer who played as a striker.

He started his football career in 1948 with hometown club FK Sarajevo, for whom he made his first-team debut in 1952. Ferhatović remained with the club until his retirement in 1967, although he represented Fenerbahçe in the 1962–63 Turkish league season. He won a solitary cap for the Yugoslavia national team in 1961.

== Club career ==
During the 1950s and 1960s, Ferhatović led FK Sarajevo to great heights, and became the club's best and most famous player, scoring 198 goals in 422 games. He also had a short stint at Fenerbahçe where he played only seven league games and scored one goal. After only half a season he left Fenerbahçe and went back to Sarajevo. His greatest personal achievement was becoming the lead scorer in the Yugoslav First League with 19 goals for FK Sarajevo in the 1963–64 season. His last season, (1966–67) saw Sarajevo win their first-ever First League title and qualify for the European Cup.

Ferhatović's retirement was one of the most important events in Sarajevo's sporting history, and the local newspapers ran the headline Jedan je Hase! (There is Only One Hase!) in his honour that day.

== International career ==
Ferhatović played once for the Yugoslavia national team, on 8 October 1961 against South Korea in a qualification match for the 1962 FIFA World Cup.

== Death and legacy ==
Ferhatović died on 23 January 1987, a day before his 54th birthday, of a heart attack.

Sarajevo's Asim Ferhatović Hase Stadium, the site of the Opening Ceremonies of the 1984 Winter Olympics and the home of FK Sarajevo, is named in his honour. The Bosnia and Herzegovina national team often used the stadium for their international matches in the past. It is also the largest stadium in Bosnia and Herzegovina.

== In popular culture ==
The Bosnian rock band Zabranjeno Pušenje wrote a song in honour of Ferhatović called Nedjelja kad je otišao Hase ("The Sunday When Hase Left") and was included in their 1985 album Dok čekaš sabah sa šejtanom.

== Honours ==
=== Player ===
Sarajevo

- Yugoslav First League: 1966–67

Individual

- Yugoslav First League top goalscorer: 1963–64
