= Fuad Muzurović =

Bosnian footballer and manager (born 1945)

Personal information
- Date of birth: 3 November 1945 (age 80)
- Place of birth: Bijelo Polje, DF Yugoslavia
- Position: Full-back

Senior career*
Years	Team	Apps	(Gls)
1962-1964	Jedinstvo Bijelo Polje		
1964–1974	Sarajevo	265	(1)

Managerial career
- 1977–1981: Sarajevo
- 1983–1984: Prishtina
- 1985–1986: Prishtina
- 1987–1988: Adana Demirspor
- 1990–1995: Sarajevo
- 1995–1997: Bosnia and Herzegovina
- 1998: Adanaspor
- 1999: Al Arabi
- 2001–2002: Sarajevo
- 2002: Al Masry
- 2004: Cerezo Osaka
- 2006–2007: Bosnia and Herzegovina
- * Club domestic league appearances and goals

Fuad Muzurović (born 3 November 1945) is a Bosnian retired professional football manager and former player.

== Playing career ==
Although he did not have an international playing career, Muzurović is still remembered as a quality full-back playing for his hometown club Jedinstvo Bijelo Polje and Sarajevo, where he won the Yugoslav First League in the 1966–67 season.

== Managerial career ==
Muzurović's managerial skills led him to various countries with good success, although he did not manage to win many trophies. He managed Sarajevo in three periods, with the first one from 1977 to 1981 in Yugoslav First League, achieving a runner-up place in 1980. After that Muzurović was the manager of Prishtina from 1983 to 1984, managing to drive the small newcomer side to the best position in their history when they finished 8th in the Yugoslav First League in the 1983–84 season. He was once again Prishtina's manager from 1985 to 1986. The next appointment was at Turkish club Adana Demirspor in 1987, staying there for one year. His second appointment as Sarajevo manager came in the 1990–91 season. After the Bosnian War, Muzurović was the first head coach of the newly founded Bosnia and Herzegovina national team, managing to clinch a historical victory against Denmark in a 3–0 thriller in Sarajevo. Failing to qualify for the 1998 FIFA World Cup, he was replaced with Džemaludin Mušović in 1998.

Muzurović then had a two-month spell as Adanaspor manager in the 1998–99 season, from where he went to Qatar's Al Arabi in 1999. The third and final appointment as Sarajevo's manager came in the 2001–02 season, managing to win his first and only managerial career, the Bosnian Cup. Muzurović was then manager of Egyptian Premier League club Al Masry in July 2002, leaving the club shortly after in December of that year. On 1 February 2004, the Japanese J1 League club Cerezo Osaka board appointed him as their manager, but was sacked after leading the club in only two games, the second fastest sacking of a manager in J1 League history.

On 21 December 2006, Muzurović became the new head coach of the Bosnia and Herzegovina national team for a second time in his career, nearly three years after getting sacked at Cerezo Osaka. One of the most memorable wins of Bosnia and Herzegovina came during Muzurović's coaching, particularly a 3–2 home win against Turkey in the UEFA Euro 2008 qualifiers on 2 June 2007, a game which also saw the international debut of Edin Džeko. He stayed as head coach until 17 December 2007.

== Managerial statistics ==
Managerial record by team and tenure
Team	From	To	Record							
Team	From	To	G	W	D	L	GF	GA	GD	Win %
Sarajevo	1 July 1977	1 September 1981	146	61	31	54	224	213	+11	41.78
Prishtina	1 July 1983	30 June 1984	35	15	3	17	39	57	−18	42.86
Prishtina	1 July 1985	30 June 1986	35	13	5	17	37	48	−11	37.14
Adana Demirspor	1 July 1987	28 November 1988	53	20	7	26	60	64	−4	37.74
Bosnia and Herzegovina	30 November 1995	7 November 1997	18	7	2	9	21	25	−4	38.89
Adanaspor	1 July 1998	30 September 1998	7	1	1	5	2	9	−7	14.29
Sarajevo	1 July 2001	30 June 2002	39	18	10	11	66	37	+29	46.15
Al Masry	1 July 2002	30 December 2002	16	8	5	3	17	13	+4	50.00
Cerezo Osaka	1 February 2004	22 March 2004	2	0	0	2	3	6	−3	0.00
Bosnia and Herzegovina	21 December 2006	17 December 2007	9	3	0	6	11	16	−5	33.33
Total			360	146	64	150	480	488	−8	40.56

== Honours ==
=== Player ===
Sarajevo

- Yugoslav First League: 1966–67

=== Manager ===
Sarajevo

- Bosnian Cup: 2001–02
