= Boško Antić =

Association football player (1944–2007)

Personal information
- Full name: Božidar Antić
- Date of birth: 7 January 1944
- Place of birth: Sarajevo, Independent State of Croatia
- Date of death: 4 December 2007 (aged 63)
- Place of death: Belgrade, Serbia
- Position: Forward

Youth career
- –1965: UNIS Vogošća

Senior career*
Years	Team	Apps	(Gls)
1965–1972	Sarajevo	153	(58)
1972–1975	Angers	103	(44)
1975–1977	Caen	49	(28)
Total		305	(130)

International career
1968	Yugoslavia	1	(0)

Managerial career
- 1983–1986: Sarajevo
- 1987–1989: Togo
- 1994–1995: Rad
- 1998: Radnički Niš
- 1998–1999: Sartid Smederevo
- 2001: Jiangsu Suning
Medal record
Men's Football
Representing Yugoslavia
European Championship
Silver medal – second place	1968 Italy	Team
- * Club domestic league appearances and goals

Božidar "Boško" Antić (Serbian Cyrillic: Божидар Бошко Антић, pronounced [bôʒidaːr bôʃko ǎːntitɕ]; 7 January 1944 – 4 December 2007) was a Yugoslav and Bosnian professional player and football manager.

== Playing career ==
Being drafted into the youth setup of Sarajevo from local side UNIS Vogošća at the age of thirteen, he started his senior career with the maroon-whites in 1965. A young and polyvalent team made up of home grown players such as Mirsad Fazlagić, Boško Prodanović, Vahidin Musemić and Antić would clinch the Yugoslav First League title in the 1966–67 season, and in doing so became the first championship-winning side in the club's history. Antić was one of the most prolific members of the said team, finding the back of the net on 14 separate occasions during the title-winning campaign, while scoring a total of 140 goals in 276 appearances in all competitions for the club. A popular rhyme of the time was "Dva Boška na dva čoška, Musemija u sredini, za pobjedu ne brini" (English: Two Boškos in two corners, Musemić in the middle, don't worry it's a win). During his time with Sarajevo he was the team's top scorer in three seasons (65/66., 66/67. and 67/68), while being the league top scorer during the 1967–68 campaign, netting in 53 goals in 53 appearances.

Antić left Sarajevo in 1972, joining French Ligue 1 side Angers, where he remained for three years, going on to score 44 goals in 103 league matches for the club, before joining Caen in the summer of 1975. After two more seasons on the French riviera, he retired from professional football in 1977.

== International career ==
Antić was a non-playing member of the Yugoslavia team that won the silver medal at the UEFA Euro 1968. He made his senior debut for them in an October 1968 FIFA World Cup qualification match against Spain, which remained his sole international appearance.

== Managerial career ==
After one year of managing the Caen U-18 team, Antić came back to Sarajevo where he spent the next five years as a youth team manager and coordinator. In 1983, he was named manager of the Sarajevo first team with whom he clinched the Yugoslav title in the 1984–85 season, thus becoming the first person in the club's history to win titles both as a player and as a manager. During the three seasons as first team manager, he was assisted by former teammate Mirsad Fazlagić.

In 1987, Antić was named Togo national team head coach - a position he held for eighteen months, eventually moving back to Sarajevo with the desire to retire from professional managing. With the start of the Bosnian war and the Siege of Sarajevo in 1992, he had to leave for Belgrade where his wife was hospitalized with an illness, sometime before the siege commenced and completely cut Sarajevo off the outside world. Eventually, since the situations was lasting one, he stayed in Belgrade until his death. Indeed, while in Serbia he managed Radnički Niš and Sartid Smederevo. Antić would also go on to manage Chinese club Jiangsu Suning for a short while in 2001.

== Death ==
Antić died on 4 December 2007 in Belgrade, Serbia after a long illness at the age of 63.

== Honours ==
=== Player ===
Sarajevo

- Yugoslav First League: 1966–67

Yugoslavia

- UEFA European Championship runner-up: 1968

=== Individual ===
Performance

- Ligue 2 Top Goalscorer: 1975–76 (25 goals)

=== Manager ===
Sarajevo

- Yugoslav First League: 1984–85
