= Refik Muftić =

Yugoslav footballer

Personal information
- Full name: Refik Muftić
- Date of birth: 28 August 1939
- Place of birth: Foča, Kingdom of Yugoslavia
- Date of death: 21 April 2019 (aged 79)
- Place of death: Sarajevo, Bosnia and Herzegovina
- Position: Goalkeeper

Youth career
- Famos Hrasnica

Senior career*
Years	Team	Apps	(Gls)
1962–1964	Famos Hrasnica	35	(0)
1964–1973	Sarajevo	222	(0)
1973–1974	WSG Radenthein	30	(0)
1974–1977	Sturm Graz	44	(0)
- * Club domestic league appearances and goals

Refik "Refa" Muftić (28 August 1939 – 21 April 2019) was a Yugoslav and Bosnian footballer who played as a goalkeeper. He spent the majority of his career with FK Sarajevo.

== Club career ==
Born in Foča, Muftić moved to Sarajevo as a refugee during World War II. After starting his career with Famos Hrasnica, he arrived at the Koševo City Stadium in the summer of 1964, joining FK Sarajevo. During his first season at the club, he was named starting goalkeeper. He was extremely reliable and was voted best young goalkeeper of the Yugoslav First League in 1965. In the fall of 1966, he left for his mandatory military service, hence making only five appearances in the 1966-67 championship-winning season.

After returning from the Yugoslav People's Army, Muftić returned to goal in subsequent European Cup matches. In the following six seasons, he was once again irreplaceable in Sarajevo's starting lineup. He won the Champions Summer League with Sarajevo in the summer of 1972 before saying goodbye to the club a year later. He played his testimonial match in August 1973, when he stood between the posts for the first 15 minutes of the Summer Champions League game against city rivals, Željezničar. He continued his career in the Austrian Bundesliga with WSG Radenthein, from which he moved to SK Sturm Graz just one year later, where he spent the last three years of his career.

During his nine-year stay in Sarajevo, Muftić made 222 official appearances, making a total of 342 appearances when including friendly matches, going on to score 3 goals. He is widely considered to be the best Sarajevo goalkeeper of all time.

== Personal life ==
His daughter Šejla is a retired women's professional basketball player and diplomat. His grandson Luka Garza is a professional basketball player for the Boston Celtics of the National Basketball Association (NBA).

== Death ==
Muftić died in Sarajevo, Bosnia and Herzegovina, on 21 April 2019.

== Honours ==
Sarajevo

- Yugoslav First League: 1966–67
