= Boško Prodanović =

Yugoslav football manager and player (1943–2024)

Personal information
- Date of birth: 1 August 1943
- Place of birth: Otočac, Independent State of Croatia
- Date of death: 16 April 2024 (aged 80)
- Place of death: Belgrade, Serbia
- Position: Right winger

Senior career*
Years	Team	Apps	(Gls)
1964–1971	Sarajevo	108	(37)
1972	Radnički Kragujevac	10	(0)
Total		118	(37)

International career
1968	Yugoslavia	1	(0)

Managerial career
- Jedinstvo Paraćin
- 1995–1996: Napredak Kruševac
- 1997: Obilić
- * Club domestic league appearances and goals

Boško Prodanović (Serbian Cyrillic: Бошко Продановић; 1 August 1943 – 16 April 2024) was a Yugoslav football manager and player.

== Club career ==
Prodanović spent most of his playing career at Sarajevo (1964–1971), establishing a formidable partnership with fellow namesake Boško Antić and helping the club win its first ever title in 1966–67 season. He also briefly played for Radnički Kragujevac before retiring.

== International career ==
At international level, Prodanović was capped once for Yugoslavia, playing the full 90 minutes in a 2–0 home friendly loss to Brazil on 25 June 1968.

== Managerial career ==
After hanging up his boots, Prodanović served as manager of several clubs, including Napredak Kruševac and Obilić.

== Death ==
Prodanović died on 16 April 2024, at the age of 80.

== Honours ==
Sarajevo

- Yugoslav First League: 1966–67
