= Milenko Bajić =

Personal information
- Full name: Milenko Bajić
- Date of birth: 20 August 1944
- Place of birth: Resanovci, DF Yugoslavia
- Date of death: 24 April 2009 (aged 64)
- Place of death: Sarajevo, Bosnia and Herzegovina
- Position: Defender

Youth career
- 1956–1962: FK Sarajevo

Senior career*
Years	Team	Apps	(Gls)
1962–1964	Igman Konjic	42	(1)
1964–1972	FK Sarajevo	223	(1)
1972–1975	Sion	51	(0)

International career
1970	Yugoslavia	1	(0)

Managerial career
- 1983–1986: FK Sarajevo (assistant)
- * Club domestic league appearances and goals

Milenko Bajić (20 August 1944 – 24 April 2009) was a former Bosnian-Herzegovinian and Yugoslav professional footballer and manager.

== Club career ==
He played for FK Sarajevo and Sion. As a member of the FK Sarajevo coaching staff, he went on to win the club's second Yugoslav League title in 1985.

== International career ==
Bajić made his debut for Yugoslavia in an April 1970 friendly match against Austria, which remained his sole international appearance.
