= Sreten Šiljkut =

Yugoslav footballer

Personal information
- Full name: Sreten Šiljkut
- Date of birth: 27 October 1938
- Place of birth: Pazarić, Kingdom of Yugoslavia
- Position: Midfielder

Senior career*
| Years | Team | Apps | (Gls) |
| 1956–1962 | UNIS Vogošća | 87 | (4) |
| 1962–1970 | FK Sarajevo | 193 | (12) |
| 1970–1973 | UNIS Vogošća | 32 | (0) |

Managerial career
- 1976–1985: FK Sarajevo (youth)
- * Club domestic league appearances and goals

Sreten Šiljkut (Serbian Cyrillic: Сретен Шиљкут; born 27 October 1938) is a former Yugoslav and Bosnian footballer who spent the majority of his playing career with FK Sarajevo.

== Club career ==
He was a member of FK Sarajevo from 1962 to 1970, going on to win the club's first Yugoslav League title in 1967. He started and concluded his playing career with UNIS Vogošća.
