= Vahidin Musemić =

Bosnian footballer (1946–2023)

Personal information
- Date of birth: 29 October 1946
- Place of birth: Janja, PR Bosnia and Herzegovina, FPR Yugoslavia
- Date of death: 30 June 2023 (aged 76)
- Place of death: Sarajevo, Bosnia and Herzegovina
- Position: Striker

Youth career
- 1961–1965: Sarajevo

Senior career*
Years	Team	Apps	(Gls)
1965–1974	Sarajevo	163	(73)
1974–1976	Nice	42	(19)
Total		205	(92)

International career
1968–1970	Yugoslavia	17	(9)
Medal record
Men's Football
Representing Yugoslavia
European Championship
Silver medal – second place	1968 Italy	Team
- * Club domestic league appearances and goals

Vahidin Musemić (29 October 1946 – 30 June 2023) was a Bosnian professional footballer who played as a striker.

== Club career ==
Born in the town of Janja, near Bijeljina, Musemić started his career at Sarajevo, becoming one of the club's highest ever goalscorers during the nine years he spent there. He was part of the Sarajevo team which managed to win the 1966–67 Yugoslav First League title. He earned the nickname Orao (the Eagle) because of his soaring headers. Musemić finished his career at French side Nice in 1976.

== International career ==
Musemić made his debut for Yugoslavia in an April 1968 European Championship qualification match away against France and earned a total of 17 caps, scoring 9 goals. His final international was an October 1970 friendly game against the Soviet Union.

== Personal life and death ==
Musemić's younger brother, Husref, is also a former professional footballer and football manager. He played for and later managed FK Sarajevo, and is the club's most decorated manager.

Musemić died in Sarajevo on 30 June 2023, at the age of 76.

== Honours ==
Sarajevo

- Yugoslav First League: 1966–67

Yugoslavia

- UEFA European Championship runner-up: 1968
