= Bosnia and Herzegovina in the Eurovision Song Contest 2005 =

- Eurovision Song Contest 2005
- Participating broadcaster: Radio and Television of Bosnia and Herzegovina (BHRT)
- Country: Bosnia and Herzegovina
- Selection process: BH Eurosong 2005
- Selection date: 6 March 2005

Competing entry
- Song: "Call Me"
- Artist: Feminnem
- Songwriters: Andrej Babić

Placement
- Final result: 14th, 79 points

Participation chronology

Bosnia and Herzegovina was represented at the Eurovision Song Contest 2005 with the song "Call Me", written by Andrej Babić, and performed by the group Feminnem. The Bosnian-Herzegovinian participating broadcaster, Radio and Television of Bosnia and Herzegovina (BHRT), organised the national final BH Eurosong 2005 in order to select its entry for the contest. Fourteen entries participated during the show on 6 March 2005 where a combination of jury and public televoting selected "Zovi" performed by Feminnem as the winner. The song was later translated from Croatian to English for Eurovision and was titled "Call Me".

As one of the ten highest placed finishers in 2004, Bosnia and Herzegovina automatically qualified to compete in the final of the Eurovision Song Contest. Performing during the show in position 21, Bosnia and Herzegovina placed fourteenth out of the 24 participating countries with 79 points.

== Background ==
Prior to the 2005 contest, Radiotelevizija Bosne i Hercegovine (RTVBiH) until 1999, and Public Broadcasting Service of Bosnia and Herzegovina (PBSBiH) since 2001, had participated in the Eurovision Song Contest representing Bosnia and Herzegovina ten times since RTVBiH's first entry in 1993. Their best placing in the contest was seventh, achieved in 1999 with the song "Putnici" performed by Dino and Béatrice. Their least successful result has been 22nd place, achieved in 1996.

On 13 August 2004, PBSBiH became Radio and Television of Bosnia and Herzegovina (BHRT). On 10 December 2004, the new broadcaster confirmed its intentions to participate at the Eurovision Song Contest 2005. In 2004, PBSBiH had selected the artist through an internal selection process, while a national final was set up to choose the song. For 2005, BHRT selected its entry through a national final that featured several artists and songs.

== Before Eurovision ==
=== BH Eurosong 2005 ===
BH Eurosong 2005 was the tenth edition of BH Eurosong, the national final organised by BHRT to select its entry for the Eurovision Song Contest 2005. The competition was held on 6 March 2005 at the BHRT studios in Sarajevo and hosted by Maja Tatić (who represented Bosnia and Herzegovina in 2002), Deen (who represented Bosnia and Herzegovina in 2004), and Seid Memić Vajta (who represented Yugoslavia in 1981). The show was broadcast on BHT 1 and BH Radio 1.

==== Competing entries ====
On 10 December 2004, the broadcaster opened the submission period for composers to submit their songs up until 17 January 2005. 87 submissions were received at the closing of the deadline and on 19 January 2005, BHRT announced the fifteen songs selected to compete in the national final. The ten-member selection committee that determined the competing songs from the received submissions consisted of Nataša Bogdanović (music producer at Radio RS), Kristijan Čarapina (director of Melodije Mostara), Ferida Duraković (poet), Milorad Kenjalović (Dean of Academy of Arts at the University of Banja Luka), Samir Pašalić (music editor at FTV), Antonio Šajin (Executive Director of Radio Dobre vibracije), Nurudin Vatrenjak (music producer), and members of the Bosnian-Herzegovinian delegation for the Eurovision Song Contest: Dejan Kukrić, Ninoslav Verber and Vesna Andree-Zaimović. The competing artists, determined by BHRT in consultation with the selected songwriters, were announced on 15 February 2005 and included Mija Martina (who represented Bosnia and Herzegovina in 2003). The song "C'mon Boy", written by Aleksandra Kovač, was later withdrawn from the competition due to unsuccessful agreements with performer Selma Bajrami.

Artist	Song	Songwriter(s)
Feminnem	"Zovi"	Andrej Babić
G.D.H.	"No More"	Đorđe Striček Vukasović
IF	"Groznica me trese zbog tebe"	Sanela Dedić, Haris Dedić
Igor Vukojević	"Jabuka"	Igor Vukojević
Jasna Gospić	"Čarolija"	Edo Mulahalilović, Adi Mulahalilović
Lea Mijatović	"Baš me briga što će mama reći"	Narcis Vučina
Maja Nurkić and Nedim Šuta	"U očima"	Melisa Salihović-Ibrahimbegović
Marija Šestić	"In This World"	Marc Paelinck, Dirk Paelinck
Mija Martina	"Ružice rumena"	Ines Prajo, Arjana Kunštek
Nikita	"You're Gonna Get What You Deserve"	Robin Rex, Anders Nyman, Jan Garthe, Maurizio Sorroni, Jovan Radomir
Ružica Čavić	"Ruža bez trna"	Aleksandra Milutinović
Josip Bilać	"Dar s neba"	Marko Tomasović, Emilija Kokić
Tinka Milinović	"Sometimes I Wish I Were a Child Again"	Serge Bonheur, Gunter Johansen
Unplugged Plug	"Everything She'll Do"	Narcis Hadžismajlović

==== Final ====
The final took place on 6 March 2005. Fourteen entries participated and the 50/50 combination of votes from a jury panel and public televoting selected "Zovi" performed by Feminnem as the winner. Tinka Milinović and Feminnem were tied at 20 points each but since Feminnem received the most votes from the jury they were declared the winners. In addition to the performances of the competing entries, the show featured a guest performance by the show host Seid Memić Vajta.

Final – 6 March 2005
R/O	Artist	Song	Jury	Televote		Total	Place
R/O	Artist	Song	Jury	Votes	Points	Total	Place
1	Maja Nurkić and Nedim Šuta	"U očima"	0	2,129	3	3	12
2	Tinka Milinović	"Sometimes I Wish I Were a Child Again"	10	10,339	10	20	2
3	Feminnem	"Zovi"	12	5,633	8	20	1
4	G.D.H.	"No More"	2	1,710	1	3	11
5	Lea Mijatović	"Baš me briga što će mama reći"	0	2,124	2	2	13
6	Ružica Čavić	"Ruža bez trna"	7	814	0	7	7
7	IF	"Groznica me trese zbog tebe"	0	2,178	4	4	9
8	Igor Vukojević	"Jabuka"	6	10,566	12	18	3
9	Jasna Gospić	"Čarolija"	5	793	0	5	8
10	Nikita	"You're Gonna Get What You Deserve"	3	906	0	3	10
11	Marija Šestić	"In This World"	8	2,520	5	13	4
12	Josip Bilać	"Dar s neba"	0	1,228	0	0	14
13	Mija Martina	"Ružice rumena"	4	4,137	6	10	5
14	Unplugged Plug	"Everything She'll Do"	1	4,229	7	8	6

=== Preparation ===
Following the national final, Feminnem prepared Croatian, Danish, English, German, Spanish, and Turkish language versions of the song. BHRT announced on 18 March 2005 that they have decided that the song would be performed in English at the Eurovision Song Contest and titled "Call Me".

== At Eurovision ==
According to Eurovision rules, all nations with the exceptions of the host country, the "Big Four" (France, Germany, Spain and the United Kingdom), and the ten highest placed finishers in the 2004 contest are required to qualify from the semi-final on 19 May 2005 in order to compete for the final on 21 May 2005; the top ten countries from the semi-final progress to the final. As Bosnia and Herzegovina finished ninth in the 2004 contest, the nation automatically qualified to compete in the final on 21 May 2005. On 22 March 2005, a special allocation draw was held which determined the running order for the semi-final and final, and Bosnia and Herzegovina was set to perform in position 21 in the final, following the entry from Russia and before the entry from Switzerland. Bosnia and Herzegovina placed fourteenth in the final, scoring 79 points.

The semi-final and the final were broadcast in Bosnia and Herzegovina on BHT 1 with commentary by Dejan Kukrić. BHRT appointed Ana Mirjana Račanović as its spokesperson to announced the Bosnian-Herzegovinian votes during the final.

=== Voting ===
Below is a breakdown of points awarded to Bosnia and Herzegovina and awarded by Bosnia and Herzegovina in the semi-final and grand final of the contest. The nation awarded its 12 points to Croatia in the semi-final and the final of the contest.

==== Points awarded to Bosnia and Herzegovina ====
Points awarded to Bosnia and Herzegovina (Final)
Score	Country
12 points	
10 points	Austria; Croatia; Turkey
8 points	Slovenia
7 points	Norway; Sweden
6 points	Netherlands
5 points	Switzerland
4 points	Denmark; Serbia and Montenegro; United Kingdom
3 points	Macedonia
2 points	
1 point	Ireland

==== Points awarded by Bosnia and Herzegovina ====
Points awarded by Bosnia and Herzegovina (Semi-final)
Score	Country
12 points	Croatia
10 points	Macedonia
8 points	Slovenia
7 points	Norway
6 points	Moldova
5 points	Romania
4 points	Ireland
3 points	Hungary
2 points	Switzerland
1 point	Bulgaria

Points awarded by Bosnia and Herzegovina (Final)
Score	Country
12 points	Croatia
10 points	Serbia and Montenegro
8 points	Turkey
7 points	Macedonia
6 points	Greece
5 points	Albania
4 points	Moldova
3 points	Norway
2 points	Romania
1 point	Hungary
