= Bosnia and Herzegovina in the Eurovision Song Contest 2004 =

- Eurovision Song Contest 2004
- Participating broadcaster: Public Broadcasting Service of Bosnia and Herzegovina (PBSBiH)
- Country: Bosnia and Herzegovina
- Selection process: Artist: Internal selection Song: BH Eurosong 2004
- Selection date: Artist: 15 January 2004; Song: 6 March 2004

Competing entry
- Song: "In the Disco"
- Artist: Deen
- Songwriters: Vesna Pisarović

Placement
- Semi-final result: Qualified (7th, 133 points)
- Final result: 9th, 91 points

Participation chronology

Bosnia and Herzegovina was represented at the Eurovision Song Contest 2004 with the song "In the Disco", written by Vesna Pisarović, and performed by Deen. The Bosnian-Herzegovinian participating broadcaster, Public Broadcasting Service of Bosnia and Herzegovina (PBSBiH), organised the national final BH Eurosong 2004 in order to select its entry for contest, after having previously selected the performer internally. On 15 January 2004, the broadcaster revealed that they had internally selected Deen as its representative. Five songs participated during the song selection show on 6 March 2004 where a combination of an eleven-member jury and public televoting selected "In the Disco" as the winning song. Songwriter Vesna Pisarović had represented Croatia in 2002 with the song "Everything I Want".

Bosnia and Herzegovina competed in the semi-final of the Eurovision Song Contest which took place on 12 May 2004. Performing during the show in position 21, "In the Disco" was announced among the top 10 entries of the semi-final and therefore qualified to compete in the final on 14 May. It was later revealed that Bosnia and Herzegovina placed seventh out of the 22 participating countries in the semi-final with 133 points. In the final, Bosnia and Herzegovina performed in position 12 and placed ninth out of the 24 participating countries, scoring 91 points.

== Background ==
Prior to the 2004 contest, Radiotelevizija Bosne i Hercegovine (RTVBiH) until 1999, and Public Broadcasting Service of Bosnia and Herzegovina (PBSBiH) since 2001, had participated in the Eurovision Song Contest representing Bosnia and Herzegovina nine times since RTVBiH's first entry in 1993. Their best placing in the contest was seventh, achieved in 1999 with the song "Putnici" performed by Dino and Béatrice. Their least successful result has been 22nd place, achieved in 1996.

As part of its duties as participating broadcaster, PBSBiH organised the selection of its entry in the contest and broadcast the event in the country. The broadcaster confirmed its intentions to participate at the 2004 contest on 28 December 2003. PBSBiH had selected its entry through a national final that featured several artists and songs in the past. In 2004, the broadcaster selected its artist through an internal selection process, while a national final was set up to choose the song.

== Before Eurovision ==
=== Artist selection ===
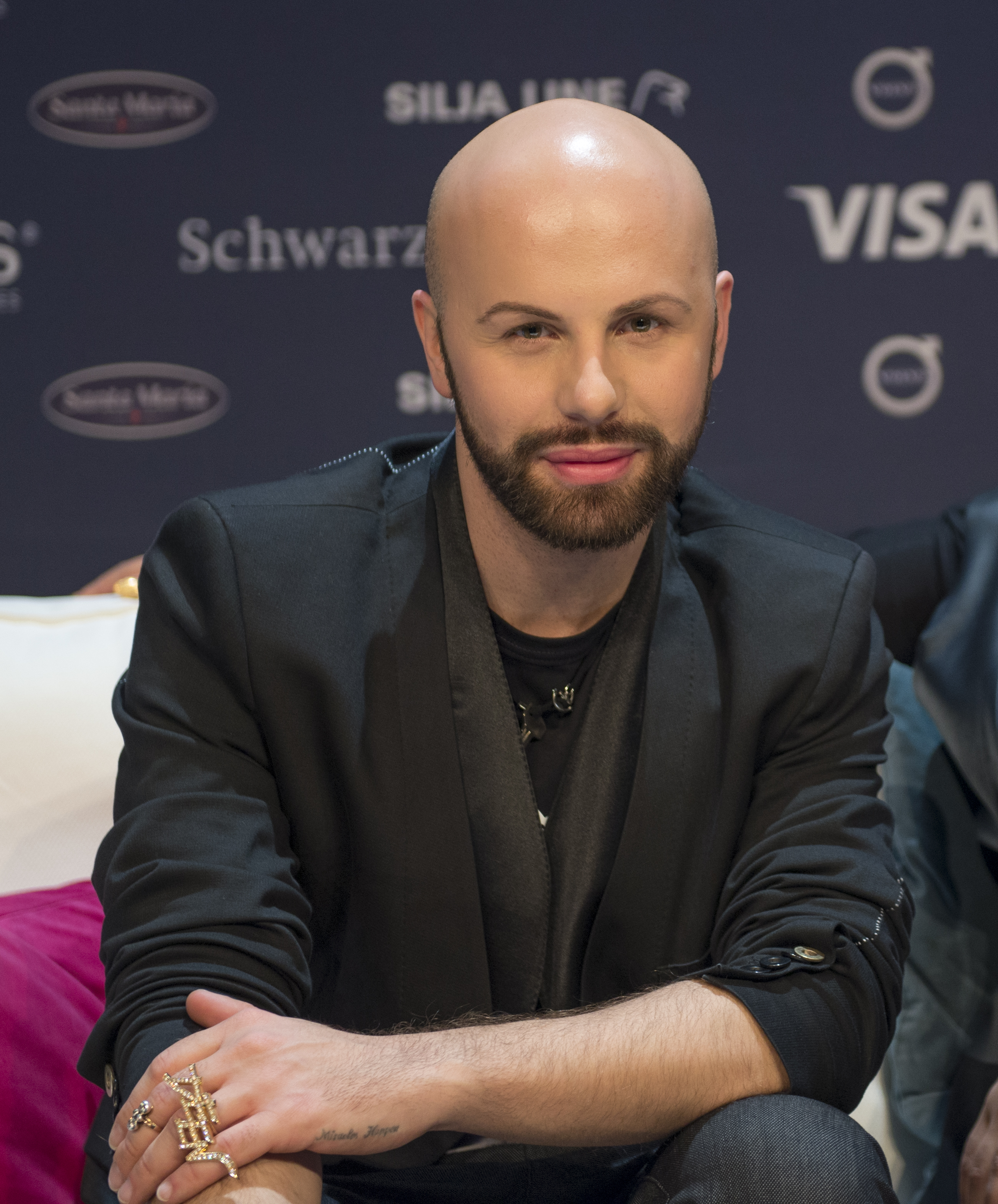
Deen (pictured in 2016) was internally selected to represent Bosnia and Herzegovina in 2004

On 28 December 2003, PBSBiH opened the application period for artists to submit their entries up until 9 January 2004. Artists were required to be citizens of Bosnia and Herzegovina, have at least three years of television or concert appearances, and have released at least two albums and three music videos. 5 valid applications out of 7 were received at the closing of the deadline, which were evaluated by a 21-member selection committee over four rounds of voting. In each round, each member on the committee awarded two sets of scores to each candidate against two criteria (voice and performance) resulting in one act being eliminated. The scores varied in each round: 1 and 5 points in the first round, 1 to 4 points in the second round, 1 to 3 points in the third round and 1 to 2 points in the fourth round.

On 15 January 2004, PBSBiH announced that Deen had been selected to represent Bosnia and Herzegovina in Eurovision. Deen previously attempted to represent Bosnia and Herzegovina in the Eurovision Song Contest by participating in several national finals: in 1999 as part of Seven Up with the song "Daj, spusti se" which placed third, in 2001 with the song "10 miliona ljubavi" which placed seventh, and in 2003 with the song "Taxi" which placed second. The broadcaster also announced that a national final would be held to select the song to be performed at the contest.

Selection committee members
- Ahmed Burić
- Aleksandar Tomašević
- Alma Dautbegović
- Alma Memić
- Bojana Karanović
- Boris Jovanović
- Branko Vekić
- Damir Šehanović
- Dijana Radulj
- Dragoljub Sladojević
- Emir Čolaković
- Haris Dedić
- Josip Dujmović
- Leila Kurbegović
- Mario Vrankić
- Mija Martina
- Ninoslav Verber
- Samir Pašalić
- Senad Hadžifejzović
- Vanja Ciraj
- Vesna Andree-Zaimović

Results of the artist selection
Artist	First Round	Second Round	Third Round	Final Round
Deen	1st 192	1st 148	1st 116	1st 77
Nermin Puškar	3rd 167	2nd 93	2nd 72	2nd 49
Tinka Milinović	2nd 170	2nd 93	3rd 64	Eliminated
Igor Vukojević	4th 165	4th 86	Eliminated	
Sajid Jusić	5th 72	Eliminated		

=== BH Eurosong 2004 ===
Following the artist announcement on 15 January 2004, the broadcaster opened the submission period for composers to submit their songs up until 17 January 2004. Songwriters were required to be citizens of Bosnia and Herzegovina. 32 submissions were received at the closing of the deadline and on 11 February 2004, PBSBiH announced the six songs selected to compete in the national final. Among the selected songwriters were Muhamed Fazlagić (who represented Bosnia and Herzegovina in 1993) and Vesna Pisarović (who represented Croatia in 2002). The song "Pridi bliže" was later disqualified from the competition due to songwriter Andrej Babić not having Bosnian citizenship.

PBSBiH held the final on 6 March 2004 at its studios in Sarajevo, hosted by Ana Vilenica and Enis Bešlagić, and was broadcast on BHTV1, Hayat TV and BH Radio 1. All five competing songs were performed by Deen and the 50/50 combination of votes from a jury panel and public televoting that ran between 2 and 6 March 2004 selected "In the Disco" as the winning song. The eleven-member jury panel that voted during the show consisted of Vesna Arapović (professor at Music School "Mostar" and director of children's choir "Pavarotti"), Ivan Čavlović (professor at the Musicological Society FBiH), Samir Čulić (journalist, DJ and music editor), Ferida Duraković (professor and translator), Marin Gradac (music professor and music editor), Miroslav Kenjalović (Dean of Academy of Arts at the University of Banja Luka), Slobodan Kovačević (guitarist and architect), Tijana Vignjević (conductor and music professor), Vesna Andree-Zaimović (musicologist), Ninoslav Verber (music professor and President of PBSBiH Musical Production) and Deen. "In the Disco" was the first song performed entirely in English that was selected to represent Bosnia and Herzegovina at the Eurovision Song Contest.

Final – 6 March 2004
R/O	Song	Songwriter(s)	Jury	Televote		Total	Place
R/O	Song	Songwriter(s)	Jury	Votes	Points	Total	Place
1	"Pobjednik"	Muhamed Fazlagić	3	4,689	2	5	4
2	"Trebam te"	Lejla Ćatović	1	1,499	1	2	5
3	"Spava Sarajevo"	Nermin Morankić, Mahir Sarihodžić	4	5,163	3	7	2
4	"Wanted to Make It"	Narcis Hadžismajlović	2	5,812	4	6	3
5	"In the Disco"	Vesna Pisarović	5	14,015	5	10	1

== At Eurovision ==
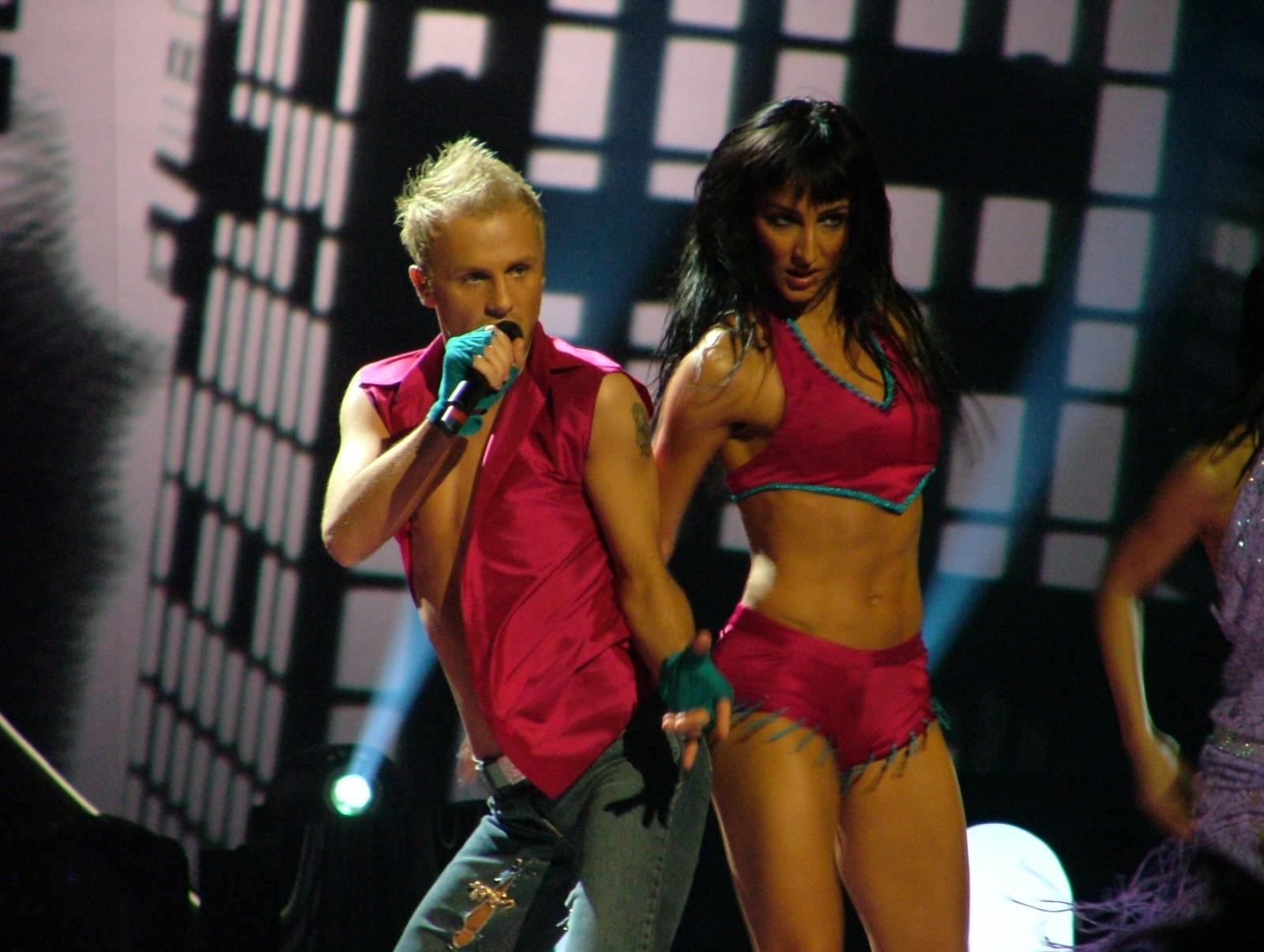
Deen during a rehearsal before the semi-final

It was announced that the competition's format would be expanded to include a semi-final in 2004. According to the rules, all nations with the exceptions of the host country, the "Big Four" (France, Germany, Spain, and the United Kingdom), and the ten highest placed finishers in the 2003 contest are required to qualify from the semi-final on 12 May 2004 in order to compete for the final on 15 May 2004; the top ten countries from the semi-final progress to the final. On 23 March 2004, a special allocation draw was held which determined the running order for the semi-final and Bosnia and Herzegovina was set to perform in position 7, following the entry from Serbia and Montenegro and before the entry from the Netherlands. At the end of the semi-final, Bosnia and Herzegovina was announced as having finished in the top 10 and consequently qualifying for the grand final. It was later revealed that Bosnia and Herzegovina placed seventh in the semi-final, receiving a total of 133 points. The draw for the running order for the final was done by the presenters during the announcement of the ten qualifying countries during the semi-final and Bosnia and Herzegovina was drawn to perform in position 12, following the entry from Croatia and before the entry from Belgium. Bosnia and Herzegovina placed ninth in the final, scoring 91 points.

The semi-final and the final were broadcast in Bosnia and Herzegovina on BHTV 1 and BH Radio 1 with commentary by Dejan Kukrić. The final was also broadcast on FTV. (PBSBiH) appointed Mija Martina (who represented Bosnia and Herzegovina in 2003) as its spokesperson to announced the Bosnian-Herzegovinian votes during the final.

=== Voting ===
Below is a breakdown of points awarded to Bosnia and Herzegovina and awarded by Bosnia and Herzegovina in the semi-final and grand final of the contest. The nation awarded its 12 points to Serbia and Montenegro in the semi-final and the final of the contest.

While most of Europe implemented televoting already in 1998, this was the first year Bosnia and Herzegovina managed to implement televoting as well. Following the release of the televoting figures by the EBU after the conclusion of the competition, it was revealed that a total of 156,482 televotes were cast in Bosnia and Herzegovina during the two shows: 61,420 votes during the semi-final and 95,062 votes during the final.

==== Points awarded to Bosnia and Herzegovina ====
Points awarded to Bosnia and Herzegovina (Semi-final)
Score	Country
12 points	Denmark; Norway
10 points	Albania; Austria; Croatia; Slovenia; Sweden; Turkey
8 points	Netherlands; Switzerland
7 points	Germany; Ireland; Serbia and Montenegro
6 points	
5 points	Macedonia
4 points	United Kingdom
3 points	Belgium
2 points	
1 point	

Points awarded to Bosnia and Herzegovina (Final)
Score	Country
12 points	
10 points	Albania; Croatia; Norway; Slovenia
8 points	Denmark; Sweden
7 points	Austria; Turkey
6 points	Serbia and Montenegro
5 points	Switzerland
4 points	Macedonia; Monaco
3 points	
2 points	Netherlands
1 point	

==== Points awarded by Bosnia and Herzegovina ====
Points awarded by Bosnia and Herzegovina (Semi-final)
Score	Country
12 points	Serbia and Montenegro
10 points	Croatia
8 points	Macedonia
7 points	Ukraine
6 points	Albania
5 points	Greece
4 points	Malta
3 points	Denmark
2 points	Netherlands
1 point	Slovenia

Points awarded by Bosnia and Herzegovina (Final)
Score	Country
12 points	Serbia and Montenegro
10 points	Croatia
8 points	Macedonia
7 points	Turkey
6 points	Ukraine
5 points	Greece
4 points	Albania
3 points	Germany
2 points	Sweden
1 point	Malta
