= Bosnia and Herzegovina in the Eurovision Song Contest 2003 =

- Eurovision Song Contest 2003
- Participating broadcaster: Public Broadcasting Service of Bosnia and Herzegovina (PBSBiH)
- Country: Bosnia and Herzegovina
- Selection process: BH Eurosong 2003
- Selection date: 1 March 2003

Competing entry
- Song: "Ne brini"
- Artist: Mija Martina
- Songwriters: Ines Prajo; Arjana Kunštek

Placement
- Final result: 16th, 27 points

Participation chronology

Bosnia and Herzegovina was represented at the Eurovision Song Contest 2003 with the song "Ne brini", written by Ines Prajo and Arjana Kunštek, and performed by Mija Martina. The Bosnian-Herzegovinian participating broadcaster, Public Broadcasting Service of Bosnia and Herzegovina (PBSBiH), organised the national final BH Eurosong 2003 in order to select its entry for contest. Eighteen entries participated during the show on 1 March 2003 where the winner was determined over two rounds of voting from an eight-member jury. The top four entries in the first round advanced to the second round, during which "Ne brini" performed by Mija Martina was selected as the winner.

Bosnia and Herzegovina competed in the Eurovision Song Contest which took place on 24 May 2003. Performing during the show in position 6, Bosnia and Herzegovina placed sixteenth out of the 26 participating countries, scoring 27 points.

== Background ==
Prior to the 2003 contest, Radiotelevizija Bosne i Hercegovine (RTVBiH) until 1999, and Public Broadcasting Service of Bosnia and Herzegovina (PBSBiH) since 2001, had participated in the Eurovision Song Contest representing Bosnia and Herzegovina eight times since RTVBiH's first entry in 1993. Their best placing in the contest was seventh, achieved in 1999 with the song "Putnici" performed by Dino and Béatrice. Their least successful result has been 22nd place, achieved in 1996.

As part of its duties as participating broadcaster, PBSBiH organised the selection of its entry in the contest and broadcast the event in the country. In 2002, the broadcaster had selected its entry through a national final that featured several artists and songs, a procedure that was continued for its 2003 entry.

== Before Eurovision ==
=== BH Eurosong 2003 ===
PBSBiH held the eighth edition of BH Eurosong, BH Eurosong 2003, on 1 March 2003 at the Skenderija Hall in Sarajevo, hosted by Ana Vilenica, Enis Bešlagić and Ognjen Blagojević. The show was broadcast on BHTV1, FTV1 and FTV2 as well as streamed online via the broadcaster's website pbsbih.ba.

==== Competing entries ====
On 31 January 2003, PBSBiH announced the eighteen entries selected to compete in the national final. At least seven of the entries were determined by a selection committee from 76 received submissions, while the remaining entries were selected from submissions received by composers that were directly invited by PBSBiH for the competition. Among the competing artists was Amila Glamočak, who represented Bosnia and Herzegovina in 1996.

==== Final ====
The final was held on 1 March 2003 at the Skenderija Hall in Sarajevo. Eighteen entries participated and the winner was due to be selected over two rounds of public televoting, however the televote failed due to the large number of votes being cast and instead the votes from a jury panel were used in both rounds. In the first round, the top four entries were selected to proceed to the second round, the superfinal. In the superfinal, "Ne brini" performed by Mija Martina was selected as the winner. The eight-member jury panel that voted during both rounds consisted of Ivica Šarić (Minister of Culture and Sports of Sarajevo), Miša Molk (chief editor of the entertainment program of RTVSLO), Alma Čardžić (who represented Bosnia and Herzegovina in 1994 and in 1997), Goran Janković (painter), Sabahudin Kurt (who represented Yugoslavia in 1964), Dragan Džidić (director of Melodije Mostara), Maja Tatić (who represented Bosnia and Herzegovina in 2002) and Nermin Puškar (musician). In addition to the performances of the competing entries, the show featured a guest performance by Dino Merlin (who represented Bosnia and Herzegovina in 1999).

Final – 1 March 2003
R/O	Artist	Song	Songwriter(s)	Points	Place
1	Amila Glamočak	"Mač sa oštrice dvije"	Marin Meštrović, Sanja Bošnjak	78	4
2	Mija Martina	"Ne brini"	Ines Prajo, Arjana Kunštek	85	2
3	Hana	"Ljubav ne bira"	Hana Jušić, Samir Pašalić	53	12
4	Lea Mijatović	"Ja sam se zaljubila"	Lea Mijatović	46	17
5	El Ženid and Frederique	"Nema problema"	Enes Zlatar	60	7
6	Nataša Railić	"Trenutak"	Mladen Matović	52	14
7	Narcis Vučina and Cora	"Easily"	Narcis Vučina	49	16
8	Tinka	"I'm Never Gonna Fall"	Ivan Barbalić	53	12
9	Minja Dugalić	"Ti možeš sve"	Ines Prajo, Arjana Kunštek	60	7
10	Zabranjeno pušenje	"Agregat"	Sejo Sexon	70	5
11	Igor Vukojević	"Srce ne pita"	Igor Vukojević	86	1
12	Edin Pašić	"Laž te čini sretnom"	Dino Muharemović	44	18
13	Selma Bajrami	"Zaljubljena"	Ranko Boban	68	6
14	IF	"Samo ljubi mene ti"	Haris Dedić, Sanela Dedić	55	10
15	Deen	"Taxi"	Sead Lipovača-Zele, Fayo	84	3
16	Nesib Delibegović-Nesko	"Madona"	Nesib Delibegović	52	14
17	Biljana Matić	"Ljubavne promjene"	Senna M	60	7
18	Lejla Ćatović	"Samo se smijem"	Lejla Ćatović	54	11

Superfinal – 1 March 2003
R/O	Artist	Song	Points	Place
1	Amila Glamočak	"Mač sa oštrice dvije"	42	4
2	Mija Martina	"Ne brini"	72	1
3	Igor Vukojević	"Srce ne pita"	56	3
4	Deen	"Taxi"	58	2

== At Eurovision ==
According to Eurovision rules, all nations with the exceptions of the bottom ten countries in the 2002 contest competed in the final on 24 May 2003. On 29 November 2002, an allocation draw was held which determined the running order and Bosnia and Herzegovina was set to perform in position 6, following the entry from Malta and before the entry from Portugal. Bosnia and Herzegovina finished in sixteenth place with 27 points.

The show was broadcast in Bosnia and Herzegovina on BHTV1 with commentary by Dejan Kukrić.

=== Voting ===
Below is a breakdown of points awarded to and by Bosnia and Herzegovina in the contest. Due to televoting failure at national final, as well as poor telecommunications within the country, Bosnia and Herzegovina used jury instead of televoting. The Bosnian jury awarded its 12 points to contest winners Turkey. PBSBiH appointed Ana Vilenica as its spokesperson to announce the votes from Bosnia and Herzegovina during the show.

Points awarded to Bosnia and Herzegovina
Score	Country
12 points	Turkey
10 points	
8 points	Croatia
7 points	Austria
6 points	
5 points	
4 points	
3 points	
2 points	
1 point	

Points awarded by Bosnia and Herzegovina
Score	Country
12 points	Turkey
10 points	Belgium
8 points	France
7 points	Romania
6 points	Croatia
5 points	Austria
4 points	Slovenia
3 points	Russia
2 points	Netherlands
1 point	Sweden
