= Bosnia and Herzegovina in the Eurovision Song Contest 2002 =

- Eurovision Song Contest 2002
- Participating broadcaster: Public Broadcasting Service of Bosnia and Herzegovina (PBSBiH)
- Country: Bosnia and Herzegovina
- Selection process: BH Eurosong 2002
- Selection date: 23 February 2002

Competing entry
- Song: "Na jastuku za dvoje"
- Artist: Maja Tatić
- Songwriters: Dragan Mijatović; Ružica Čavić

Placement
- Final result: 13th, 33 points

Participation chronology

Bosnia and Herzegovina was represented at the Eurovision Song Contest 2002 with the song "Na jastuku za dvoje" (На јастуку за двоје), composed by Dragan Mijatović, with lyrics by Ružica Čavić, and performed by Maja Tatić. The participating broadcaster for Bosnia and Herzegovina, Public Broadcasting Service of Bosnia and Herzegovina (PBSBiH), organised the national final BH Eurosong 2002 in order to select its entry for the contest. Sixteen entries participated during the show on 23 February 2002 where the winner was determined over two rounds of voting. The top five entries in the first round selected by an eight-member jury advanced to the second round, during which "Na jastuku za dvoje" performed by Maja Tatić was selected as the winner.

Bosnia and Herzegovina competed in the Eurovision Song Contest which took place on 25 May 2002. Performing during the show in position 15, Bosnia and Herzegovina placed thirteenth out of the 24 participating countries, scoring 33 points.

== Background ==
Prior to the 2002 contest, Radiotelevision of Bosnia-Herzegovina (RTVBiH) until 1999, and Public Broadcasting Service of Bosnia and Herzegovina (PBSBiH) in 2001, had participated in the Eurovision Song Contest representing Bosnia and Herzegovina seven times since RTVBiH's first entry in 1993. Their best placing in the contest was seventh, achieved in 1999 with the song "Putnici" performed by Dino and Béatrice. Their least successful result has been 22nd place, achieved in 1996.

As part of its duties as participating broadcaster, PBSBiH organised the selection of its entry in the contest and broadcast the event in the country. In 2001, the broadcaster selected its entry through a national final that featured several artists and songs, a procedure that was continued for its 2002 entry.

== Before Eurovision ==
=== BH Eurosong 2002 ===
PBSBiH held the seventh edition of BH Eurosong, BH Eurosong 2002, on 23 February 2002 at the FTV studios in Sarajevo, hosted by Segmedina Srna and Mladen Vuković. The show was broadcast on BHTV1 as well as streamed online via the broadcaster's website pbsbih.ba.

==== Competing entries ====
On 11 October 2001, the broadcaster opened the submission period for artists and composers to submit their entries up until 10 November 2001. 115 valid submissions out of 170 were received at the closing of the deadline and on 11 January 2002, PBSBiH announced the sixteen entries selected to compete in the national final. Among the selected songwriters was Dino Dervišhalidović, who represented Bosnia and Herzegovina in 1999. The eight-member selection committee that determined the competing entries from the received submissions consisted of Milorad Kenjalović (Dean of Academy of Arts at the University of Banja Luka), Dragan Džidić (director of Melodije Mostara), Elmir Rekić (director of Festival Bihać), Ismeta Dervoz (FTV Eurovision Song Contest 2002 executive producer), Miroslav Maraus (Bosnian Head of Delegation at the Eurovision Song Contest), Sinan Alimanović (music director of PBSBiH), Vasilije Pokrajčić (music director of RTRS) and Luka Sekara (professor).

Competing entries
Artist	Song	Songwriter(s)
Al' Dino	"Sanjam bolji svijet"	Al' Dino
Boje noći	"Budi malo moja"	Hamdija Mešić, Dinko Zukanović
Boris Režak feat. Karney	"Ti i ja smo mogli sve"	Boris Režak
Dragana and Geronimo	"Zlatno, zlatnije"	Dragana Kajtazović, Mirko Šenkovski
Dragana Ilić Venus	"Trnje i ruže"	Ser Jean
Edin Pašić	"Priznajem"	Dino Muharemović
Emina and KC	"Emina – U, la, la"	Dino Dervišhalidović
Lada and Lana	"Slušaj moju pjesmu"	Lada Olujić
Lily	"Vjerujem"	Ljiljana Lily Galić
Maja Tatić	"Na jastuku za dvoje"	Dragan Mijatović, Ružica Čavić
Mija Martina	"Nemoj danas"	Ines Prajo, Arijana Kunštek
Mica and Selma	"Samo zapjevaj"	Milić Vukašinović
Romeo and Biljana	"Primabalerina"	Ivica Vinković, Suzana Vinković
Slađana Mandić	"Kapije bola"	Mladen Matović
Tinka Milinović	"Sve što imaš ti"	Hamdija Salihbegović
Željka	"Ponoćno sunce"	Alen Mustafić, Miroslav Pilj

==== Final ====
The final was held on 23 February 2002. Sixteen entries participated and two rounds of voting selected the winner. In the first round, the top five entries were selected by an eight-member jury panel to proceed to the second round, the superfinal. In the superfinal, an alternate three-member jury panel selected "Na jastuku za dvoje" performed by Maja Tatić as the winner. The jury that voted during the first round consisted of Nino Pršeš (who represented Bosnia and Herzegovina in 2001), Vesna Smiljanić (piano teacher at the Music School "Vlado Milošević"), Blaž Slišković (head coach of the Bosnia and Herzegovina national football team), Dragan Kostić (surgeon at the Banja Luka Clinical Center), Mladen Vojičić Tifa (singer), Mediha Musliović (actress of the Sarajevo National Theatre), Vehid Šehić (President of the Forum of Tuzla Citizens) and Vesna Andree-Zaimović (musicologist), while the jury that voted during the second round consisted of Miroslav Maraus (Bosnian Head of Delegation at the Eurovision Song Contest), Amila Bakšić (opera director of the Sarajevo National Theatre), and Vasilije Pokrajčić (music director of RTRS).

Final – 23 February 2002
R/O	Artist	Song	Points	Place
1	Slađana Mandić	"Kapije bola"	53	8
2	Romeo and Biljana	"Primabalerina"	49	12
3	Dragana Ilić Venus	"Trnje i ruže"	53	8
4	Edin Pašić	"Priznajem"	42	16
5	Tinka Milinović	"Sve što imaš ti"	47	14
6	Lada and Lana	"Slušaj moju pjesmu"	43	15
7	Mija Martina	"Nemoj danas"	60	5
8	Boje noći	"Budi malo moja"	49	12
9	Mica and Selma	"Samo zapjevaj"	54	7
10	Željka	"Ponoćno sunce"	50	11
11	Boris Režak feat. Karney	"Ti i ja smo mogli sve"	69	2
12	Lily	"Vjerujem"	58	6
13	Dragana and Geronimo	"Zlatno, zlatnije"	53	8
14	Maja Tatić	"Na jastuku za dvoje"	73	1
15	Al' Dino	"Sanjam bolji svijet"	65	3
16	Emina and KC	"Emina – U, la, la"	61	4

Detailed Jury Votes
R/O	Song	Nino Pršeš	Vesna Smiljanić	Blaž Slišković	Dragan Kostić	Mladen Vojičić Tifa	Mediha Musliović	Vehid Šehić	Vesna Andree-Zaimović	Total
1	"Kapije bola"	7	8	7	7	8	5	4	7	53
2	"Primabalerina"	6	7	6	8	7	3	6	6	49
3	"Trnje i ruže"	6	5	9	7	8	5	7	6	53
4	"Priznajem"	7	5	7	5	6	3	4	5	42
5	"Sve što imaš ti"	9	6	6	4	5	5	5	7	47
6	"Slušaj moju pjesmu"	6	5	6	5	6	2	7	6	43
7	"Nemoj danas"	7	6	9	6	7	8	8	9	60
8	"Budi malo moja"	7	5	6	5	7	4	7	8	49
9	"Samo zapjevaj"	8	8	9	4	7	5	6	7	54
10	"Ponoćno sunce"	7	7	7	5	7	4	7	6	50
11	"Ti i ja smo mogli sve"	10	10	7	9	7	7	10	9	69
12	"Vjerujem"	10	7	9	5	6	6	8	7	58
13	"Zlatno, zlatnije"	7	5	8	8	6	4	8	7	53
14	"Na jastuku za dvoje"	7	10	8	10	10	8	10	10	73
15	"Sanjam bolji svijet"	10	6	7	6	8	10	9	9	65
16	"Emina – U, la, la"	8	7	6	5	8	9	10	8	61

Superfinal – 23 February 2002
R/O	Artist	Song	Jury Votes			Total	Place
R/O	Artist	Song	Miroslav Maraus	Amila Bakšić	Vasilije Pokrajčić	Total	Place
1	Mija Martina	"Nemoj danas"	5	7	7	19	2
2	Boris Režak feat. Karney	"Ti i ja smo mogli sve"	7	3	5	15	4
3	Maja Tatić	"Na jastuku za dvoje"	10	5	10	25	1
4	Al' Dino	"Sanjam bolji svijet"	3	10	3	16	3
5	Emina and KC	"Emina – U, la, la"	1	1	1	3	5

== At Eurovision ==
According to Eurovision rules, all nations with the exceptions of the bottom six countries in the 2001 contest competed in the final. On 9 November 2001, a special allocation draw was held which determined the running order and Bosnia and Herzegovina was set to perform in position 15, following the entry from the Denmark and before the entry from Belgium. Bosnia and Herzegovina finished in thirteenth place with 33 points.

The show was broadcast in Bosnia and Herzegovina on BHTV1 with commentary by Ismeta Dervoz-Krvavac.

=== Voting ===
Below is a breakdown of points awarded to and by Bosnia and Herzegovina in the contest. The Bosnian jury awarded its 12 points to Sweden in the contest. PBSBiH appointed Segmedina Srna as its spokesperson to announce the votes from Bosnian jury during the show.

Points awarded to Bosnia and Herzegovina
Score	Country
12 points	
10 points	
8 points	
7 points	Austria; Croatia
6 points	Sweden
5 points	
4 points	
3 points	Macedonia; Malta; Spain
2 points	Denmark; Slovenia
1 point	

Points awarded by Bosnia and Herzegovina
Score	Country
12 points	Sweden
10 points	Estonia
8 points	France
7 points	United Kingdom
6 points	Spain
5 points	Latvia
4 points	Malta
3 points	Finland
2 points	Croatia
1 point	Slovenia
