= Jadranka Stojaković =

Jadranka Stojaković Јадранка Стојаковић
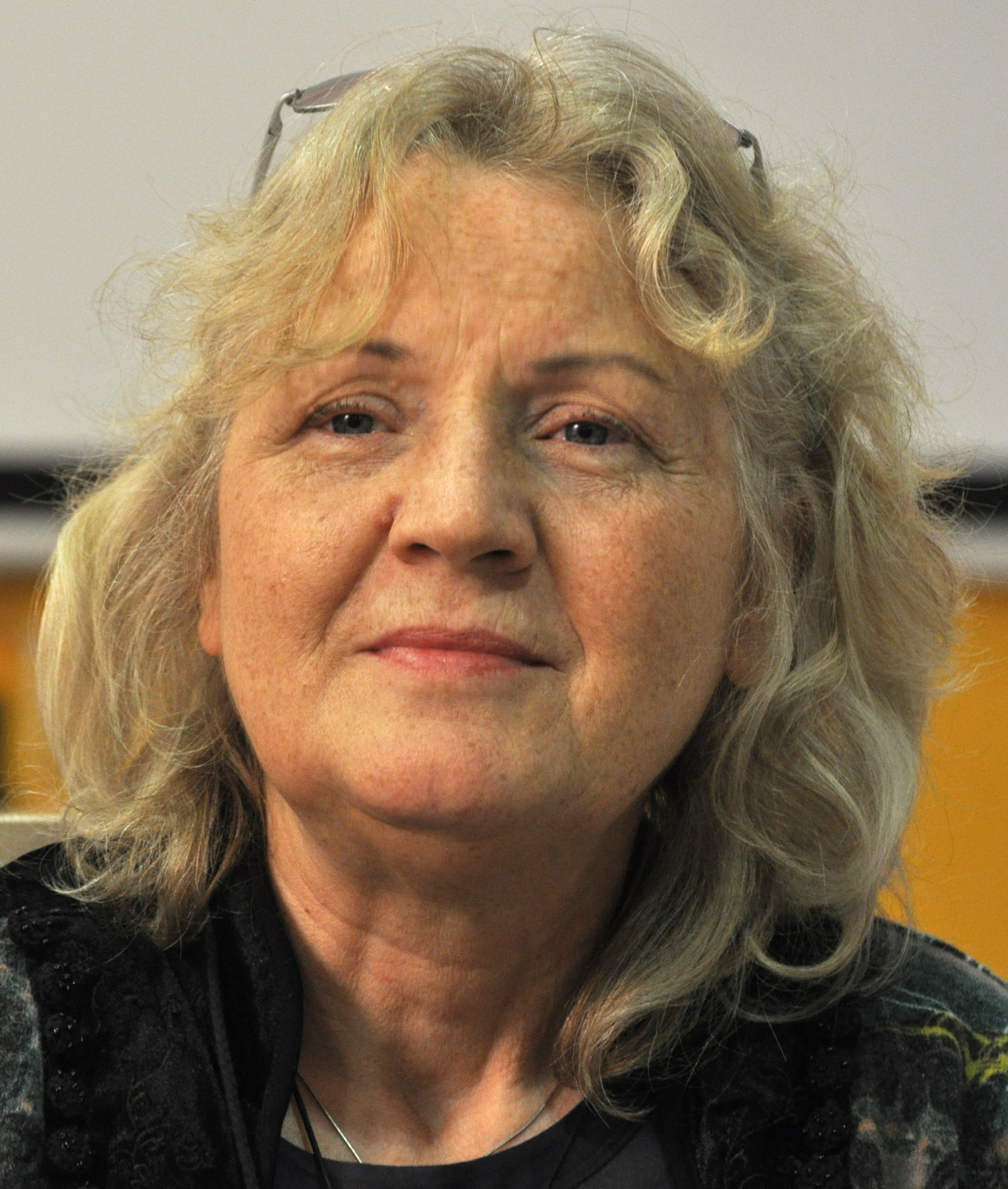
- Stojaković in April 2011

Background information
- Born: 24 July 1950; Sarajevo, PR Bosnia and Herzegovina, FPR Yugoslavia
- Died: 3 May 2016 (aged 65) Banja Luka, Republika Srpska, Bosnia and Herzegovina
- Occupation: Singer-songwriter
- Instrument: Vocals
- Years active: 1972–2011

Jadranka Stojaković (Serbian Cyrillic: Јадранка Стојаковић, 24 July 1950 – 3 May 2016) was a Bosnian singer-songwriter popular in the former Yugoslavia, known for her unique voice. Her best known hits are "Sve smo mogli mi", "Što te nema", and "Bistre vode Bosnom teku".

== Biography ==
Stojaković was born in Sarajevo to a family of school teachers. Her infancy was spent in a small village near Bosanski Novi where her parents were assigned as teachers. Her parents soon divorced and she moved with her mother back to Sarajevo. Over the subsequent few years, the two were continually on the move—throughout Yugoslav towns and communities experiencing shortages of primary school teachers where her mother would get work—Dubrovnik, Gradac na Moru, Vareš, etc. Stojaković and her mother eventually settled in various villages around Sarajevo, which is where Stojaković spent a notable part of her childhood.

At the age of 16, Stojaković joined her uncle Vukašin Radulović's jazz group and performed with them throughout the country as well other parts of Europe (mostly Germany). In 1981 she sang backing vocals with Ismeta Dervoz for Yugoslav representative Vajta at the 1981 Eurovision Song Contest in Ireland. At the 1984 Winter Olympics, held in her native Sarajevo, she sang the official theme song of the Games. Around that time, she was awarded the prize for SFR Yugoslavia's best artist.

She resided in Japan from 1988 until 2011. During that time, she also worked for Konami. In 2009, she suffered an accident on stage, tripping over a cable during a concert. She was diagnosed with amyotrophic lateral sclerosis (ALS), a motor neuron disease. After receiving a small compensation for her injury, Stojaković moved back to Bosnia and continued to battle the disability. In addition, Stojaković was in dispute with Bosnian officials to regain her property, an apartment in Sarajevo that was taken away from her while she was abroad. Nonetheless, she was determined to compose and write more music.

After her return from Japan, Stojaković performed several pre-scheduled concerts in 2011 and moved to Banja Luka where she commenced treatments at the Dr Miroslav Zotović physical medicine and rehabilitation facility in Slatina. Simultaneously, she found employment as an executive at the Radio Televizija Republike Srpske (RTRS) music production in Banja Luka. A benefit concert for her medical treatments was held at Borik Sports Hall in December 2012 with many of her peers and colleagues taking part, Ognjan Radivojević, Kiki Lesendrić, Bilja Krstić, Sergej Ćetković, Maja Odžaklijevska, Željko Vasić, Kemal Monteno, Regina, Vajta, Romana, Tifa, Vlado Podany, Maja Tatić, Marija Šestić, Igor Vukojević, Dado Glišić, Boris Režak, Mari Mari, Maja Nikolić, Bojan Marović, Jacques Houdek, Milan Stanković, and Jovana Tipšin. Stojaković's compilation album Boje zvuka was released by RTRS in 2013.

As she grew increasingly ill, Stojaković eventually retreated to a Banja Luka nursing home. On 22 February 2016, at the Banski Dvor cultural centre in Banja Luka, a concert to raise funds for Stojaković's medical and living expenses was held, with Željko Joksimović, Haris Džinović, Jelena Tomašević, Romana, Iva Ćurić, Maja Tatić, Zdenka Kovačiček, and Marko Bošnjak performing. On 16 April 2016, at the Republika Srpska National Theater, actor Petar Božović put on a medley of monodrama performances from prior theatrical stagings of The Ray of the Microcosm, Reče mi jedan čoek, Ćeraćemo se još, and Kad budem mlađi; the proceeds of the performance went to Stojaković. Stojaković died in the nursing home on 3 May 2016. She was buried on 9 May 2016 in Vrbanja, a suburb of Banja Luka.

== Discography ==
=== Albums ===
1. Svitanje (Dawn), LP 8018, Diskoton Sarajevo, 1981.
2. Da odmoriš malo dušu (Rest Your Soul a Little), LP 8052, Diskoton, Sarajevo, 1982.
3. Sve te više volim (I love you more and more), LP 3149, Sarajevo disk, Sarajevo, 1985.
4. Vjerujem (I believe) LP 2122677, PGP RTB Belgrade, 1987.
5. Sarajevo balada CD SC4106, Omagatoki Records, 1994.
6. Baby Universe, Omagatoki Records, 1996.
7. 音色 = Otoiro - Adriatic Muse On The Cruise, Omagatoki Records, 2007.
8. Daleko (Far Away), Croatia Records, 2011.

=== Singles ===
1. Kanashimi wo Moyashite / Yokan (Burning Sorrow / Premonition), KIDA-7616, King Records (Japan), Tokyo, Oct 23rd, 1996.

== Legacy ==
The Pokémon Slowbro was named Yadoran (ヤドラン) in Japanese for Jadranka Stojaković. While working for Konami, she had a colleague who later joined Game Freak and brought her name to mind while naming Slowbro.
