= Bosnia and Herzegovina in the Eurovision Song Contest 2001 =

- Eurovision Song Contest 2001
- Participating broadcaster: Public Broadcasting Service of Bosnia and Herzegovina (PBSBiH)
- Country: Bosnia and Herzegovina
- Selection process: BH Eurosong 2001
- Selection date: 10 March 2001

Competing entry
- Song: "Hano"
- Artist: Nino Pršeš
- Songwriter: Nino Pršeš

Placement
- Final result: 14th, 29 points

Participation chronology

Bosnia and Herzegovina was represented at the Eurovision Song Contest 2001 with the song "Hano" written and performed by Nino Pršeš. The Bosnian-Herzegovinian participating broadcaster, Public Broadcasting Service of Bosnia and Herzegovina (PBSBiH), selected its entry for the contest through the national final BH Eurosong 2001. They returned to the contest after a one-year absence following their relegation in 2000 as one of the six entrants with the lowest average scores over the previous five contests. Nineteen entries participated during the show on 10 March 2001 and an eight-member jury selected "Hano" performed by Nino Pršeš as the winner.

Bosnia and Herzegovina competed in the Eurovision Song Contest which took place on 12 May 2001. Performing during the show in position 3, Bosnia and Herzegovina placed fourteenth out of the 23 participating countries, scoring 29 points.

== Background ==
Prior to the 2001 contest, Radiotelevision of Bosnia-Herzegovina (RTVBiH) had participated in the Eurovision Song Contest representing Bosnia and Herzegovina six times since its first entry in 1993. Its best placing in the contest was seventh, achieved in 1999 with the song "Putnici" performed by Dino and Béatrice. Its least successful result has been 22nd place, have achieved in 1996.

After RTVBiH's membership in the European Broadcasting Union (EBU) was transferred to the new parental broadcasting organisation Public Broadcasting Service of Bosnia and Herzegovina (PBSBiH) in 2000, it was the latter who participated in the Eurovision Song Contest 2001. As part of its duties as participating broadcaster, PBSBiH organised the selection of its entry in the contest and broadcast the event in the country. From 1994 to 1997, RTVBiH selected the artist through an internal selection process, while a national final was set up to choose the song. In 1999, the broadcaster selected the entry through a national final that featured several artists and songs, a procedure that PBSBiH continued for its 2001 entry.

== Before Eurovision ==
=== BH Eurosong 2001 ===
PBSBiH held the sixth edition of BH Eurosong, BH Eurosong 2001, on 10 March 2001 at its television studios in Sarajevo, hosted by Selma Alispahić and Darko Gutović. The show was broadcast on BHTV1 and BH Radio 1.

==== Competing entries ====
The broadcaster opened the submission period for composers to submit their songs up until 20 December 2000. A total of 82 submissions were received at the closing of the deadline and a selection committee consisting of representatives from the two Bosnian broadcasters, Radio-Television of the Federation of Bosnia and Herzegovina (RTVBiH) and Radio Televizija Republike Srpske (RTRS), selected nineteen songs to compete in the national final. Among the competing artists was Amila Glamočak, who represented Bosnia and Herzegovina in 1996.

==== Final ====
The final was held on 10 March 2001 at the PBSBiH studios in Sarajevo. Nineteen entries participated and the votes from a jury panel selected "Hano" performed by Nino Pršeš as the winner. The eight-member jury panel that voted during the show consisted of Zlatan Fazlić (1993 Bosnian Eurovision entrant), Jasmin Komić (Vice Dean of the Academy of Economics at the University of Banja Luka), Miro Janjanin (musician), Aida Kurtović (member of the Apeiron Mostar Youth Association), Mladen Matović (student at the University of Banja Luka), Predrag Đajić (music editor), Anica Vrilić (music student at the University of Banja Luka), and Branislav Petar Štumf (music editor).

Final – 10 March 2001
R/O	Artist	Song	Songwriter(s)	Points	Place
1	Al' Dino	"Sve ti opraštam"	Al' Dino	65	2
2	Ružica Čavić	"Oprosti mi"	Milorad Petrić	64	3
3	Ljiljana Galić-Lily	"Ginem za tobom"	Ljiljana Galić-Lily	45	15
4	Fuad Backović	"10 miliona ljubavi"	Zele Lipovača, Faruk Buljubašić	60	7
5	Tatjana Vidojević	"Pronađi me"	Božidar Bobo Vučur	31	19
6	Narcis Vučina	"Sloboda"	Narcis Vučina	46	13
7	Nesib Delibegović and Željka Katavić-Pilj	"Vrati sjećanja"	Nesib Delibegović	43	17
8	Mija Martina	"Ništa mi ne može"	Ines Prajo, Arjana Kunštek	55	11
9	Mugdim Avdić Henda	"Stara vremena"	Mugdim Avdić Henda	46	13
10	El' Vana	"Evo vam sve"	Elvana Dučić	59	9
11	Punkt	"No Language"	Nurudin Vatrenjak, Amina Agić	56	10
12	Andrej Pucarević	"Priča se"	Momo Nikić	47	12
13	Biljana Matić	"Vrijeme je"	Siniša Ninković, Igor Kravić	63	4
14	Nino Pršeš	"Hano"	Nino Pršeš	69	1
15	Nikolina and Davor	"Mustafa"	Mustafa-Bato Muharemagić, Zoran-Zoki Stanisavljević	37	18
16	Boris Režak	"Ja vjerujem"	Dušan Šestić, Dijana Rajčević	61	5
17	Elvira Rahić	"Ljubav je kao vatra"	Suad Jukić-Šule, Fahrudin Pecikoza	45	15
18	Amila Glamočak	"Ljubi me sad"	Mustafa Tanović	61	5
19	Davor Ebner and Grunti Bugli	"Ko mi te uze"	Ivan Baralić	60	7

Detailed Jury Votes
R/O	Song	Zlatan Fazlić	Jasmin Komić	Miro Janjanin	aida Kurtović	Mladen Matović	Predrag Đajić	Anica Vrilić	Branislav Petar Štumf	Total
1	"Sve ti opraštam"	8	10	7	9	8	7	8	8	65
2	"Oprosti mi"	5	10	9	7	9	6	10	8	64
3	"Ginem za tobom"	8	5	6	4	5	4	6	7	45
4	"10 miliona ljubavi"	10	8	7	2	7	9	7	10	60
5	"Pronađi me"	3	4	3	2	5	4	4	6	31
6	"Sloboda"	9	5	3	6	6	5	5	7	46
7	"Vrati sjećanja"	6	6	3	3	6	6	5	8	43
8	"Ništa mi ne može"	8	4	9	7	8	7	6	6	55
9	"Stara vremena"	9	7	4	4	4	6	4	8	46
10	"Evo vam sve"	7	6	9	4	9	6	10	8	59
11	"No Language"	10	4	3	8	7	10	7	7	56
12	"Priča se"	3	5	5	3	8	8	7	8	47
13	"Vrijeme je"	3	9	10	7	10	7	9	8	63
14	"Hano"	9	9	7	10	7	9	9	9	69
15	"Mustafa"	6	6	1	2	4	4	4	10	37
16	"Ja vjerujem"	4	8	10	7	9	7	9	7	61
17	"Ljubav je kao vatra"	9	8	3	5	5	4	6	5	45
18	"Ljubi me sad"	9	7	5	7	8	8	7	10	61
19	"Ko mi te uze"	9	6	10	5	8	9	5	8	60

== At Eurovision ==
According to Eurovision rules, the host country, the "Big Four" (France, Germany, Spain and the United Kingdom), and the 12 countries with the highest average scores between the 1996 and 2000 contests competed in the final. On 21 November 2000, a special allocation draw was held which determined the running order and Bosnia and Herzegovina was set to perform in position 15, following the entry from the Iceland and before the entry from Norway. Bosnia and Herzegovina finished in fourteenth place with 29 points.

The contest was broadcast on BHTV1, with commentary by Ismeta Dervoz-Krvavac.

=== Voting ===
Below is a breakdown of points awarded to and by Bosnia and Herzegovina in the contest. The Bosnian jury awarded its 12 points to France.

PBSBiH appointed Segmedina Srna as its spokesperson to announced the Bosnian-Herzegovinian votes during the show.

Points awarded to Bosnia and Herzegovina
Score	Country
12 points	
10 points	Croatia
8 points	
7 points	Denmark; Slovenia
6 points	
5 points	
4 points	Sweden
3 points	
2 points	
1 point	Malta

Points awarded by Bosnia and Herzegovina
Score	Country
12 points	France
10 points	Slovenia
8 points	Greece
7 points	Croatia
6 points	Israel
5 points	Spain
4 points	Estonia
3 points	Sweden
2 points	Lithuania
1 point	Malta
