= Bosnia and Herzegovina in the Eurovision Song Contest =

- Eurovision Song Contest
- Participating broadcaster: Radio and Television of Bosnia and Herzegovina (BHRT; 2005–2016) Formerly: Radio Television of Bosnia and Herzegovina (RTVBiH; 1993–2000); Public Broadcasting Service of Bosnia and Herzegovina (PBSBiH; 2001–2004)

Participation summary
- Appearances: 19 (18 finals)
- First appearance: 1993
- Last appearance: 2016
- Highest placement: 3rd: 2006
- Participation history: 1993; 1994; 1995; 1996; 1997; 1998; 1999; 2000; 2001; 2002; 2003; 2004; 2005; 2006; 2007; 2008; 2009; 2010; 2011; 2012; 2013; 2014; 2015; 2016; 2017 – 2026
- Bosnia and Herzegovina's page at Eurovision.com
- For the most recent participation see Bosnia and Herzegovina in the Eurovision Song Contest 2016

Bosnia and Herzegovina has been represented at the Eurovision Song Contest 19 times since making its debut in 1993, after coming second in the qualification round "Kvalifikacija za Millstreet". The current Bosnian participating broadcaster in the contest is the Radio and Television of Bosnia and Herzegovina (BHRT).

Bosnia and Herzegovina's best result was in 2006, when "Lejla" performed by Hari Mata Hari finished third. This remains the country's only top five result in the contest. The country also achieved five other top ten results: 1999 with "Putnici" by Dino Merlin (seventh), 2004 with "In the Disco" by Deen (ninth), 2008 with "Pokušaj" by Laka (tenth), 2009 with "Bistra voda" by Regina (ninth), and 2011 with "Love in Rewind" again by Dino Merlin (sixth). Bosnia and Herzegovina returned to the contest for the first time since 2012 at the 2016 contest, where it failed to advance from the semi-finals for the first time. The country then withdrew once again from the contest and has yet to return.

== Participation ==
Radio Television of Bosnia and Herzegovina (RTVBiH) was a full member of the European Broadcasting Union (EBU) since 1 January 1993, thus eligible to participate in the Eurovision Song Contest since then. It participated in the contest representing Bosnia and Herzegovina since its 38th edition that same year. In 2000, RTVBiH's EBU membership was transferred to a new parental broadcasting organisation, the Public Broadcasting Service of Bosnia and Herzegovina (PBSBiH), which participated in the contest representing the country from 2001 to 2004. On 13 August 2004, PBSBiH was succeeded by Radio and Television of Bosnia and Herzegovina (BHRT), which has participated in the contest since then.

Before its independence in 1992, Bosnia and Herzegovina was part of Yugoslavia. Five Yugoslavian entrants in the Eurovision Song Contest came from the former SR Bosnia and Herzegovina (1964, 1965, 1973, 1976, and 1981). The contest was broadcast in the socialist republic by the Yugoslav Radio Television's (JRT) affiliate RTV Sarajevo.

== Non-participations ==
Low average scores meant Bosnia and Herzegovina did not qualify for the contests in 1998 and 2000, and the country did not participate in the 2013 contest for financial reasons. BHRT had stated that it hoped to return to the contest in 2014, and on 18 November 2013, it submitted a preliminary application to compete in the 2014 contest. However, on 18 December 2013, it was announced that Bosnia and Herzegovina would not be returning for 2014.

On 9 September 2014, BHRT announced that it had submitted an application to compete in the 2015 contest. On 30 October 2014, BHRT stated that participation was still in jeopardy due to financial difficulties. The EBU granted it a deadline extension until 14 November 2014 to make a final decision regarding its participation. On 17 November 2014, BHRT announced that it would not be competing in the 2015 contest, having not secured the necessary funds to finance its participation.

After competing in 2016, on 29 September 2016, BHRT again announced its withdrawal from the competition in 2017, due to the difficult financial situation that the national broadcaster was currently facing. The following December, BHRT was sanctioned by the EBU due to unpaid debts, by restricting the broadcaster access to common resources.

The Bosnian head of delegation, Lejla Babović, confirmed on 29 December 2018 that BHRT's current primary goal was to return to Eurovision, but its current financial situation and mounting debts with the EBU made a return in the near future highly unlikely. This was confirmed for the following years, with a statement in November 2023 that the broadcaster remains under sanctions and is unable to compete in EBU events.

== Participation overview ==
Prior to Yugoslavia's dissolution, artists from the SR Bosnia and Herzegovina represented Yugoslavia in 1964, 1965, 1973, 1976, and 1981.

Table key
2	Second place
3	Third place

Year	Artist	Song	Language	Final	Points	Semi	Points
1993	Fazla	"Sva bol svijeta"	Bosnian	16	27	2 (Note: Progressed through Kvalifikacija za Millstreet)	52
1994	Alma and Dejan	"Ostani kraj mene"	Bosnian	15	39	No semi-finals	
1995	Davor Popović	"Dvadeset prvi vijek"	Bosnian	19	14	No semi-finals	
1996	Amila Glamočak	"Za našu ljubav"	Bosnian	22	13	21	29
1997	Alma Čardžić	"Goodbye"	Bosnian	18	22	No semi-finals	
1999	Dino and Béatrice	"Putnici"	Bosnian, French	7	86	No semi-finals	
2001	Nino	"Hano"	Bosnian, English	14	29	No semi-finals	
2002	Maja	"Na jastuku za dvoje" (На јастуку за двоје)	Serbian, English	13	33	No semi-finals	
2003	Mija Martina	"Ne brini"	Croatian, English	16	27	No semi-finals	
2004	Deen	"In the Disco"	English	9	91	7	133
2005	Feminnem	"Call Me"	English	14	79	Top 12 in 2004 final (Note: According to the then-Eurovision rules, the top ten non-Big Four countries from the previous year along with the Big Four automatically qualified for the grand final without having to compete in semi-finals. For example, if Germany and France placed inside the top ten, the 11th and 12th spots were advanced to next year's grand final along with all countries ranked in the top ten.)	
2006	Hari Mata Hari	"Lejla"	Bosnian	3	229	2	267
2007	Marija Šestić	"Rijeka bez imena" (Ријека без имена)	Serbian	11	106	Top 10 in 2006 final	
2008	Laka	"Pokušaj"	Bosnian	10	110	9	72
2009	Regina	"Bistra voda"	Bosnian	9	106	3	125
2010	Vukašin Brajić	"Thunder and Lightning"	English	17	51	8	59
2011	Dino Merlin	"Love in Rewind"	English	6	125	5	109
2012	Maya Sar	"Korake ti znam"	Bosnian	18	55	6	77
2016	Dalal and Deen feat. Ana Rucner and Jala	"Ljubav je"	Bosnian	Failed to qualify		11	104

== Songs by language ==
1. Bosnian (52.2%)
2. English (30.4%)
3. Serbian (8.69%)
4. Croatian (4.35%)
5. French (4.35%)

Songs	Language	Years
12	Bosnian	1993, 1994, 1995, 1996, 1997, 1999, 2001, 2006, 2008, 2009, 2012, 2016
7	English	2001, 2002, 2003, 2004, 2005, 2010, 2011
2	Serbian	2002, 2007
1	Croatian	2003
1	French	1999

== Awards ==
=== Marcel Bezençon Awards ===
Year	Category	Song	Composer(s) lyrics (l) / music (m)	Performer	Final	Points	Host city	Ref.
2006	Composer Award	"Lejla"	Željko Joksimović (m), Fahrudin Pecikoza (l), Dejan Ivanović (l)	Hari Mata Hari	3	229	(Greece) Athens	
2009	Composer Award	"Bistra voda"	Aleksandar Čović (m & l)	Regina	9	106	(Russia) Moscow	

== Related involvement ==
=== Heads of delegation ===
Year	Head of delegation	Ref.
2009–2012	Dejan Kukrić	
2016	Lejla Babović	

=== Conductors ===
Year	Conductor (Note: All conductors are of Bosnian nationality unless otherwise noted.)
1993 (KzM)	Esad Arnautalić
1993	(Republic of Ireland) Noel Kelehan
1994	Sinan Alimanović
1995	Sinan Alimanović
1996	Sinan Alimanović
1997	Sinan Alimanović

=== Commentators and spokespersons ===
For the show's broadcast in the country, various commentators have provided commentary on the contest in the Bosnian language. At the Eurovision Song Contest after all points are calculated, the presenters of the show call upon each voting country to invite each respective spokesperson to announce the results of their vote on-screen.

From 1961 until 1991, SR Bosnia and Herzegovina was part of Yugoslavia and JRT's affiliate RTV Sarajevo broadcast the contest there.

Year	Channel	Commentator	Spokesperson	Ref.
1993	RTVBiH	Unknown	Dejan Zagorac (Note: The spokesperson from the prequalifying round was Ismeta Dervoz-Krvavac)	
1994	RTVBiH	Unknown	Diana Grković-Foretić	
1995	RTVBiH	Unknown	Diana Grković-Foretić	
1996	RTVBiH	Unknown	Segmedina Srna	
1997	RTVBiH	Unknown	Segmedina Srna	
1998	RTVBiH	Unknown	Did not participate	
1999	RTVBiH	Unknown	Segmedina Srna	
2000	RTVBiH	Unknown	Did not participate	
2001	PBSBiH	Dejan Kukrić	Segmedina Srna	
2002	PBSBiH, RTVFBiH (FTV1)	Dejan Kukrić	Segmedina Srna	
2003	PBSBiH, RTVFBiH (FTV1)	Dejan Kukrić	Ana Vilenica	
2004	BHTV 1, BH Radio 1 (all shows); FTV (final)	Dejan Kukrić	Mija Martina	
2005	BHT 1 (all shows)	Dejan Kukrić	Ana Mirjana Račanović	
2006	BHT 1 (all shows)	Dejan Kukrić	Vesna Andree-Zaimović	
2007	BHT 1 (all shows)	Dejan Kukrić	Vesna Andree-Zaimović	
2008	BHT 1 (all shows)	Dejan Kukrić	Melina Garibović	
2009	BHT 1, BH Radio 1 (all shows)	Dejan Kukrić	Elvir Laković Laka	
2010	BHT 1 (all shows)	Dejan Kukrić	Ivana Vidmar	
2011	BHT 1 (all shows)	Dejan Kukrić	Ivana Vidmar	
2012	BHT 1 (all shows)	Dejan Kukrić	Elvir Laković Laka	
2013	BHT 1, BH Radio 1 (all shows)	Dejan Kukrić	Did not participate	
2014–2015	No broadcast		Did not participate	
2016	BHT 1, BHT HD, BH Radio 1 (all shows)	Dejan Kukrić	Ivana Crnogorac	
2017–2026	No broadcast		Did not participate	

==== Other shows ====
Show	Commentator	Channel	Ref.
Congratulations: 50 Years of the Eurovision Song Contest	Unknown	BHT 1	
Eurovision: Europe Shine a Light	Maja Čengić Miralem	BHT 1	

== Photo gallery ==
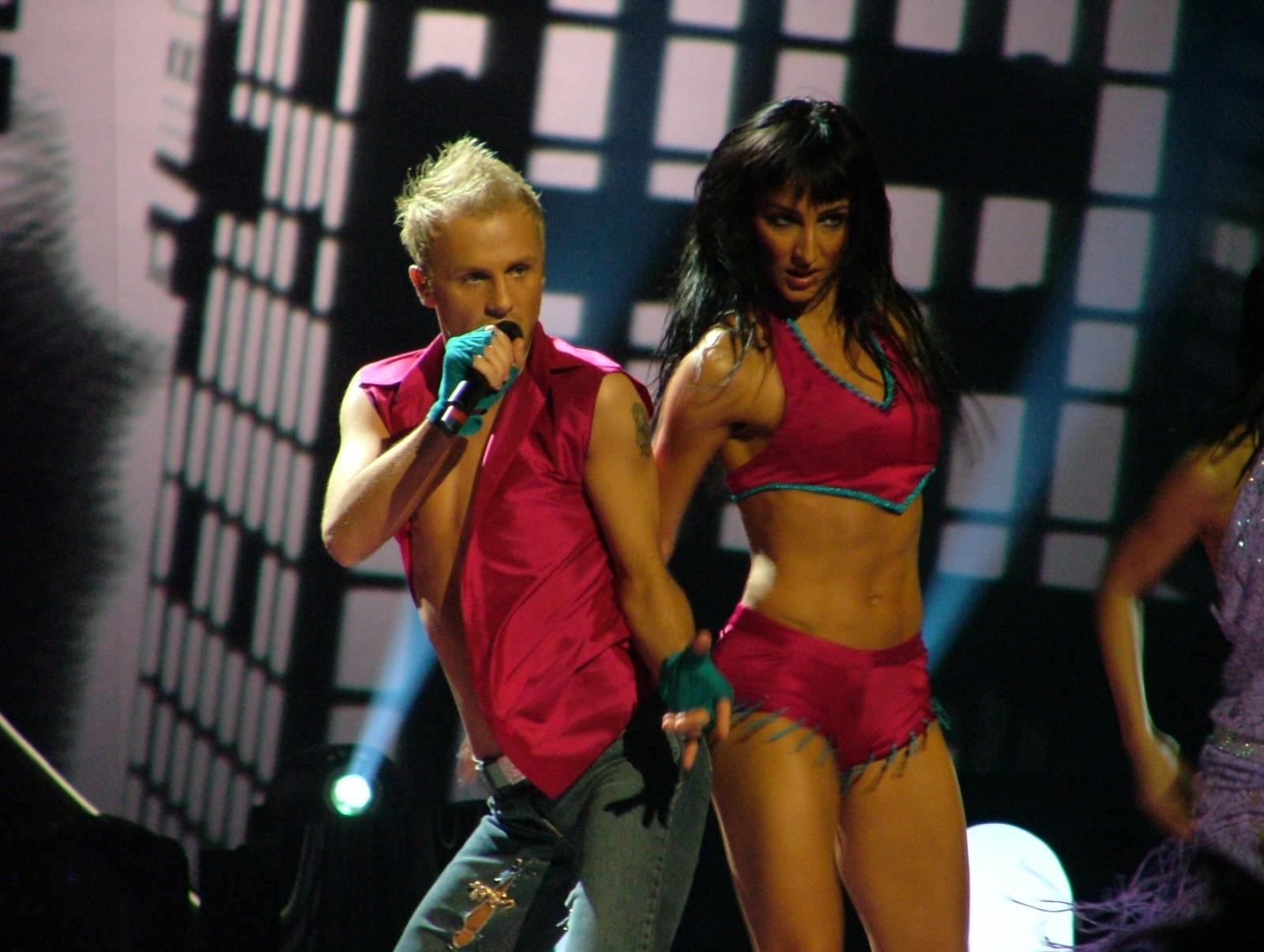
Deen performing "In the Disco" in Istanbul (2004)

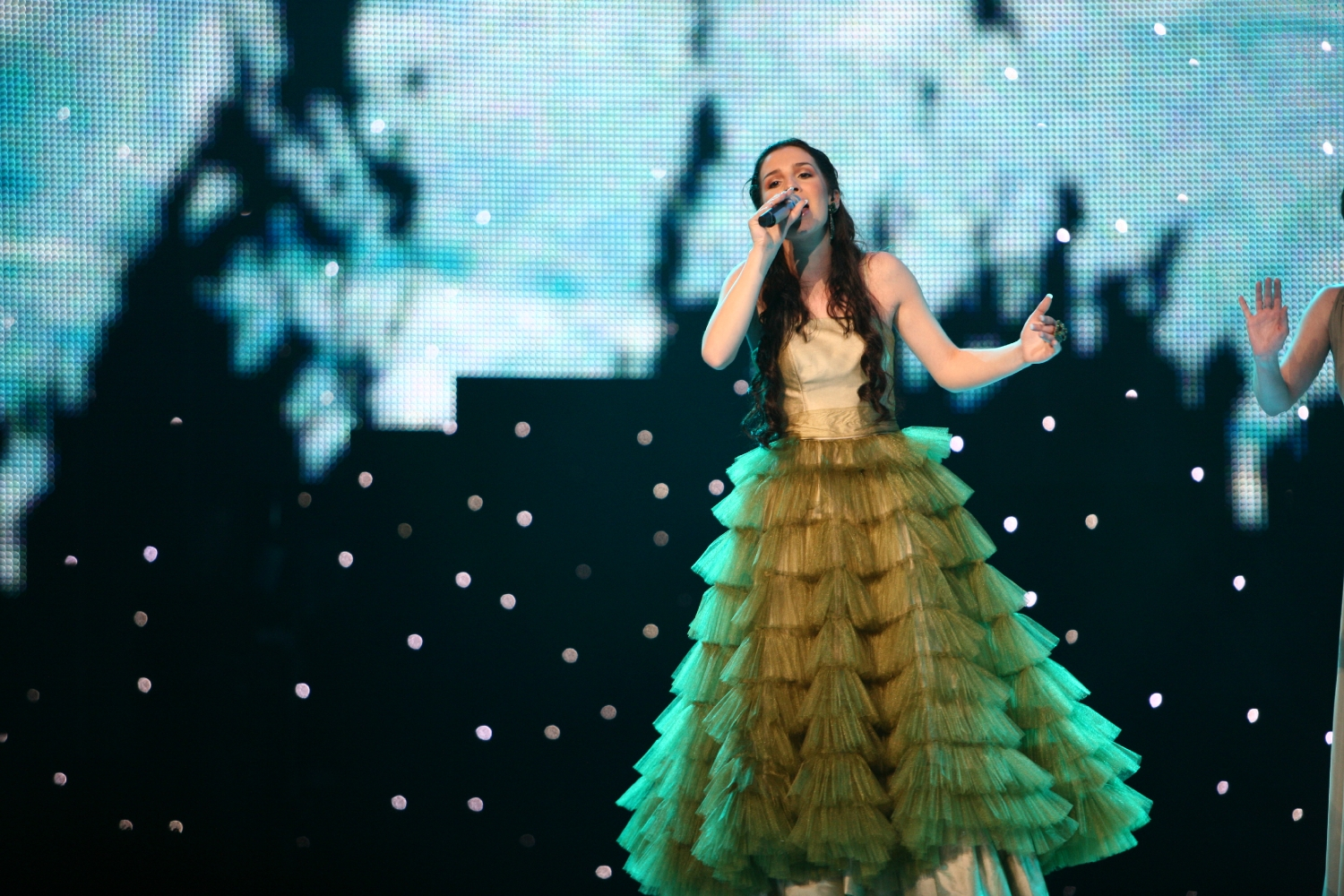
Marija Šestić performing "Rijeka bez imena" in Helsinki (2007)

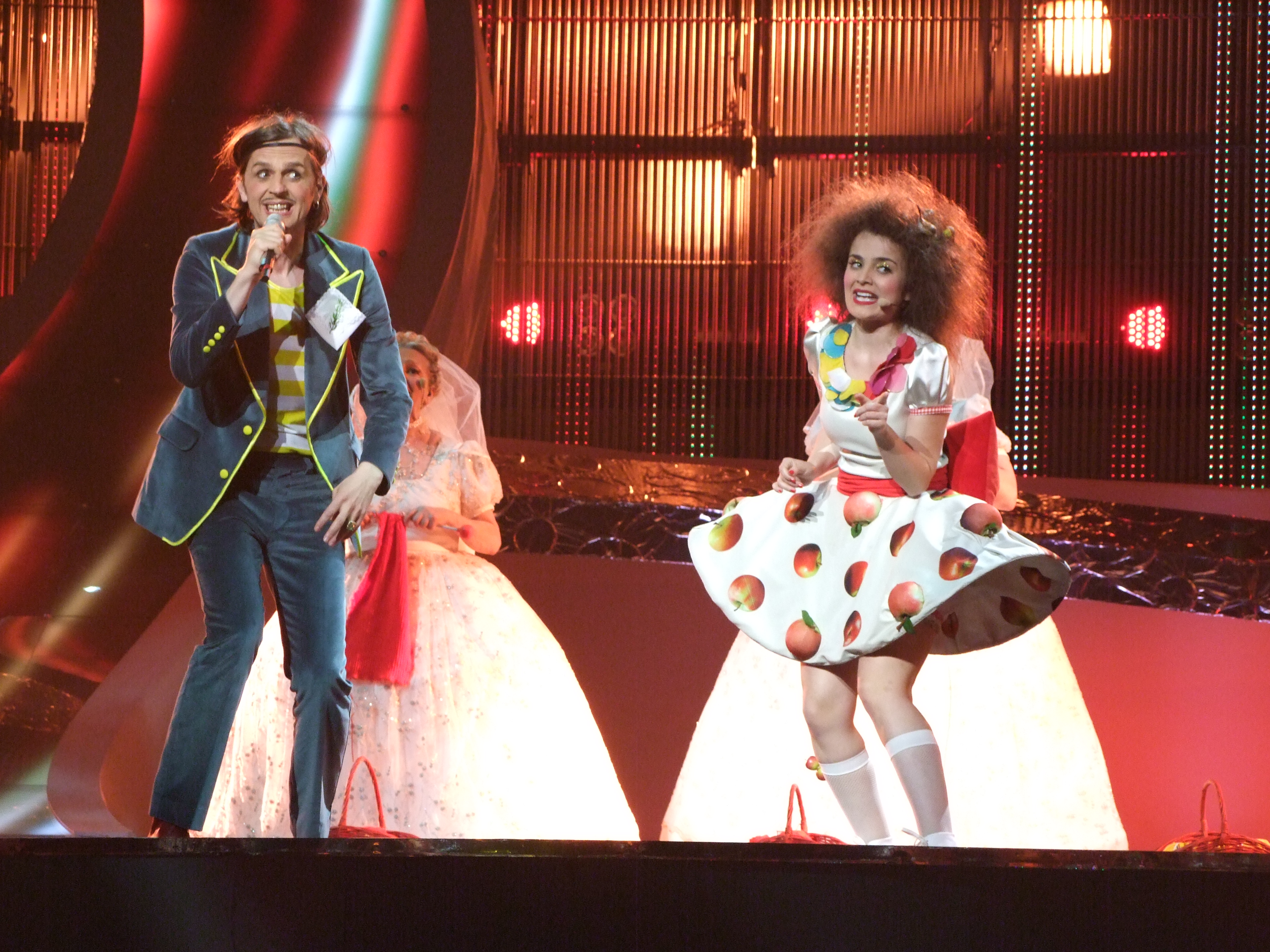
Laka performing "Pokušaj" in Belgrade (2008)

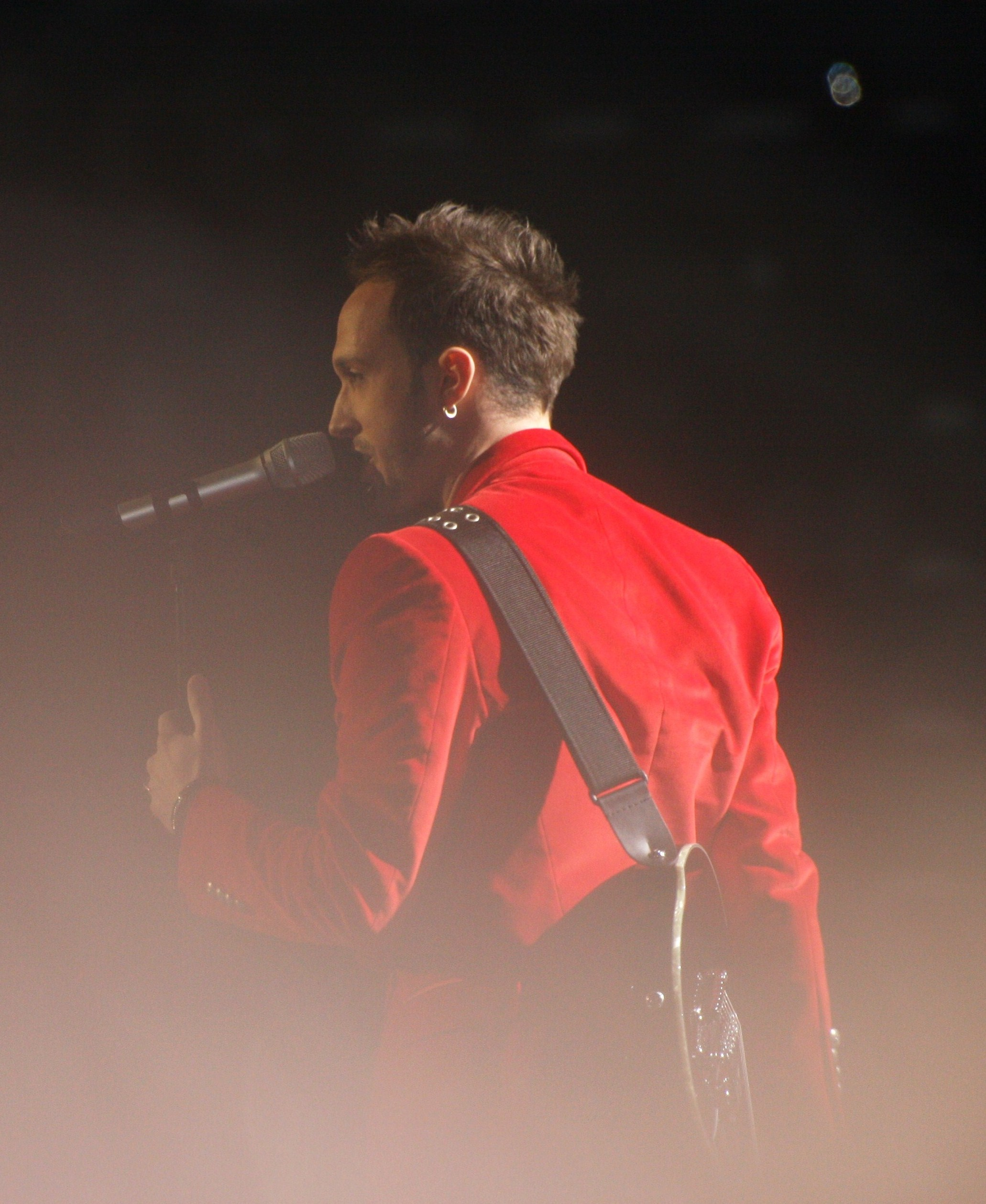
Vukašin Brajić performing "Thunder and Lightning" in Oslo (2010)

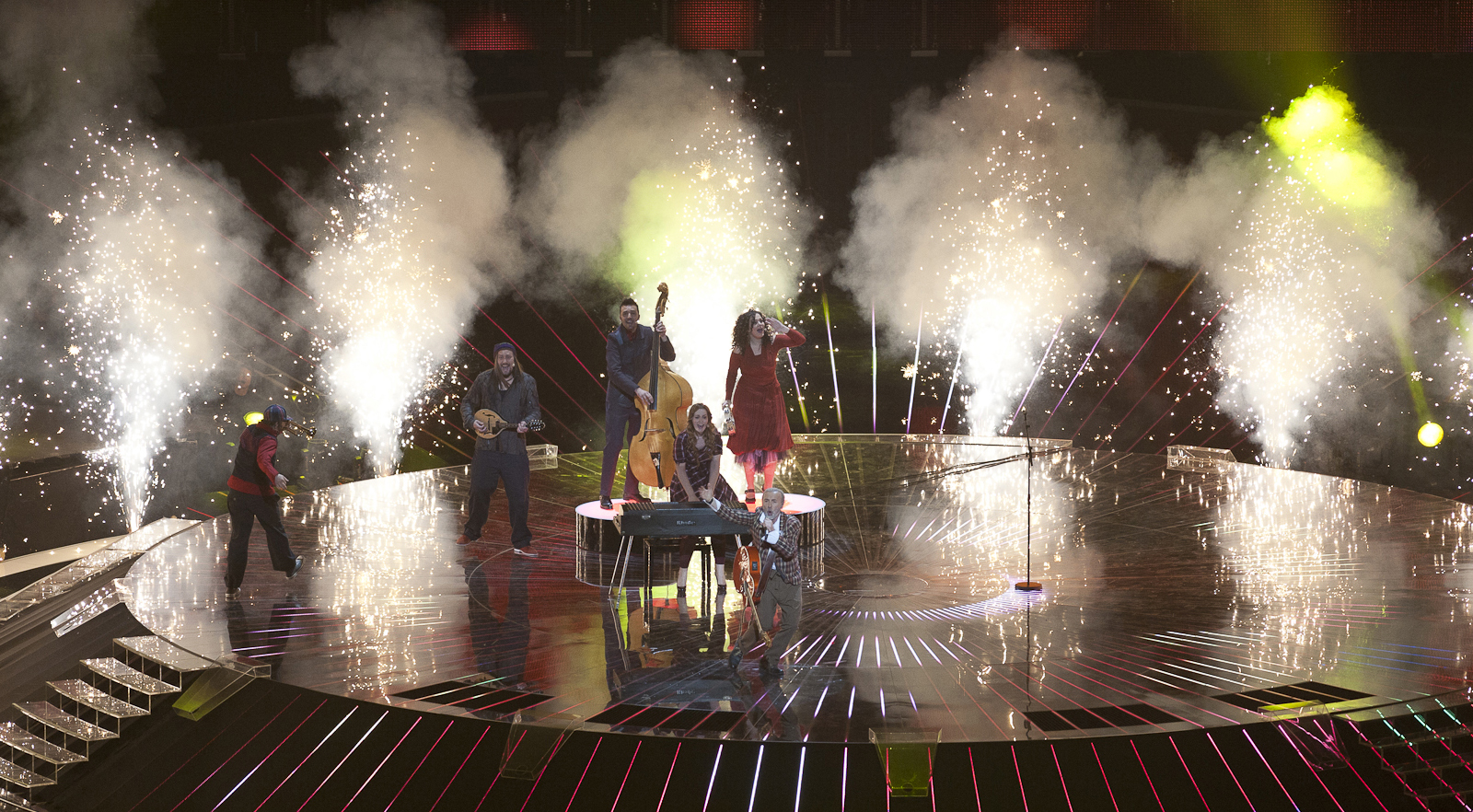
Dino Merlin performing "Love in Rewind" in Düsseldorf (2011)

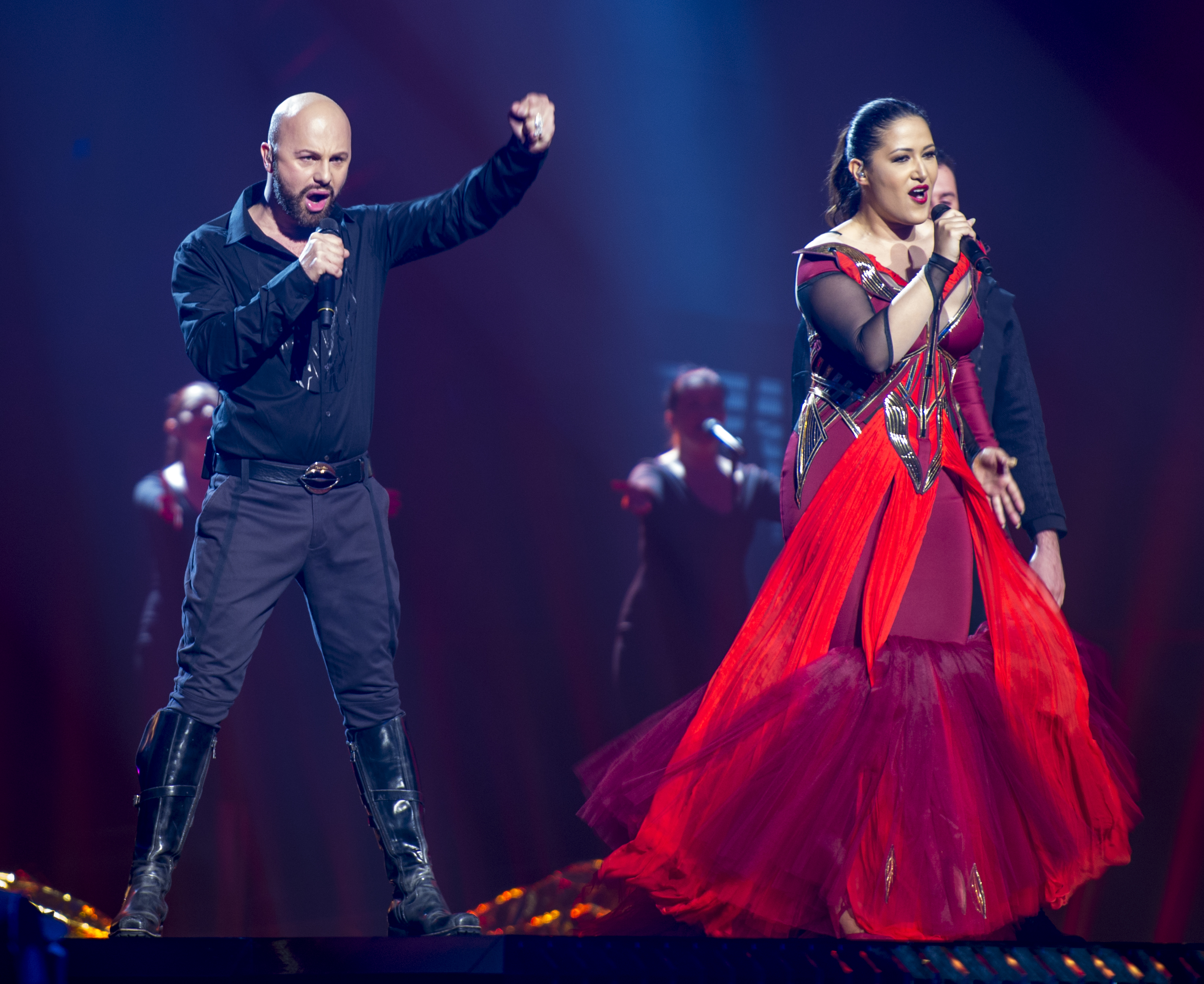
Dalal and Deen performing "Ljubav je" in Stockholm (2016)
