= Lejla (song) =

2006 song by Hari Mata Hari

Single by Hari Mata Hari
- Language: Bosnian
- Released: 5 March 2006
- Length: 3:01
- Composer: Željko Joksimović
- Lyricists: Fahrudin Pecikoza; Dejan Ivanović

Eurovision Song Contest 2006 entry
- Country: Bosnia and Herzegovina
- Artist: Hari Mata Hari
- Language: Bosnian
- Composer: Željko Joksimović
- Lyricists: Fahrudin Pecikoza; Dejan Ivanović

Finals performance
- Semi-final result: 2nd
- Semi-final points: 267
- Final result: 3rd
- Final points: 229

Entry chronology
- ◄ "Call Me" (2005)
- "Rijeka bez imena" (2007) ►

"Lejla" (Bosnian pronunciation: [lejla]) was Bosnia and Herzegovina's entry in the Eurovision Song Contest 2006, performed in the country's native language by Hari Mata Hari. It was composed and written by Željko Joksimović, the runner-up of the Eurovision Song Contest 2004 representing Serbia and Montenegro, with co-writers Fahrudin Pecikoza and Dejan Ivanović.

The song was internally selected to represent Bosnia and Herzegovina after being selected by BHT 1, Bosnia and Herzegovina's broadcaster for the contest. It remains the nation's highest-ranking achievement in Eurovision to date.

== Eurovision Song Contest ==
=== Selection ===
On 9 February 2006, the broadcaster announced that they had internally selected Hari Varešanović to represent Bosnia and Herzegovina in Athens. The song to be performed at the contest, "Lejla", was also selected internally and was presented during a television special entitled BH Eurosong 2006 on 5 March 2006. The show was broadcast on BHT 1, BHT SAT as well as streamed online via the broadcaster's website pbsbih.ba.

=== At Eurovision ===
The song was first performed in the semi-final, as Bosnia and Herzegovina had not finished in the top ten at the previous contest. Here, it was performed twenty-second, following Estonia's Sandra Oxenryd with "Through My Window" and preceding Iceland's Silvia Night with "Congratulations". Here, it received 267 points, placing second in a field of 23 and qualifying for the final. The song later on also won the journalists' award for best composition of the Eurovision Song Contest 2006.

In the final, it was performed thirteenth, following Romania's Mihai Trăistariu with "Tornerò" and preceding Lithuania's LT United with "We Are the Winners". At the close of voting, it had received 229 points, placing third in a field of 24 and meaning that Bosnia and Herzegovina would have an automatic final berth in their next contest. It became Bosnia and Herzegovina's highest ranking in Eurovision, beating Dino Merlin's seventh place in 1999.

The performance featured the entire band wearing white suits and, as the final bridge began, linking arms and walking towards the front of the stage.

== Charts ==
Chart (2006)	Peak position
Croatian Top 20 Chart	1
