= Hari Mata Hari =

Bosnian musical group; rock band

HMH Hari Mata Hari
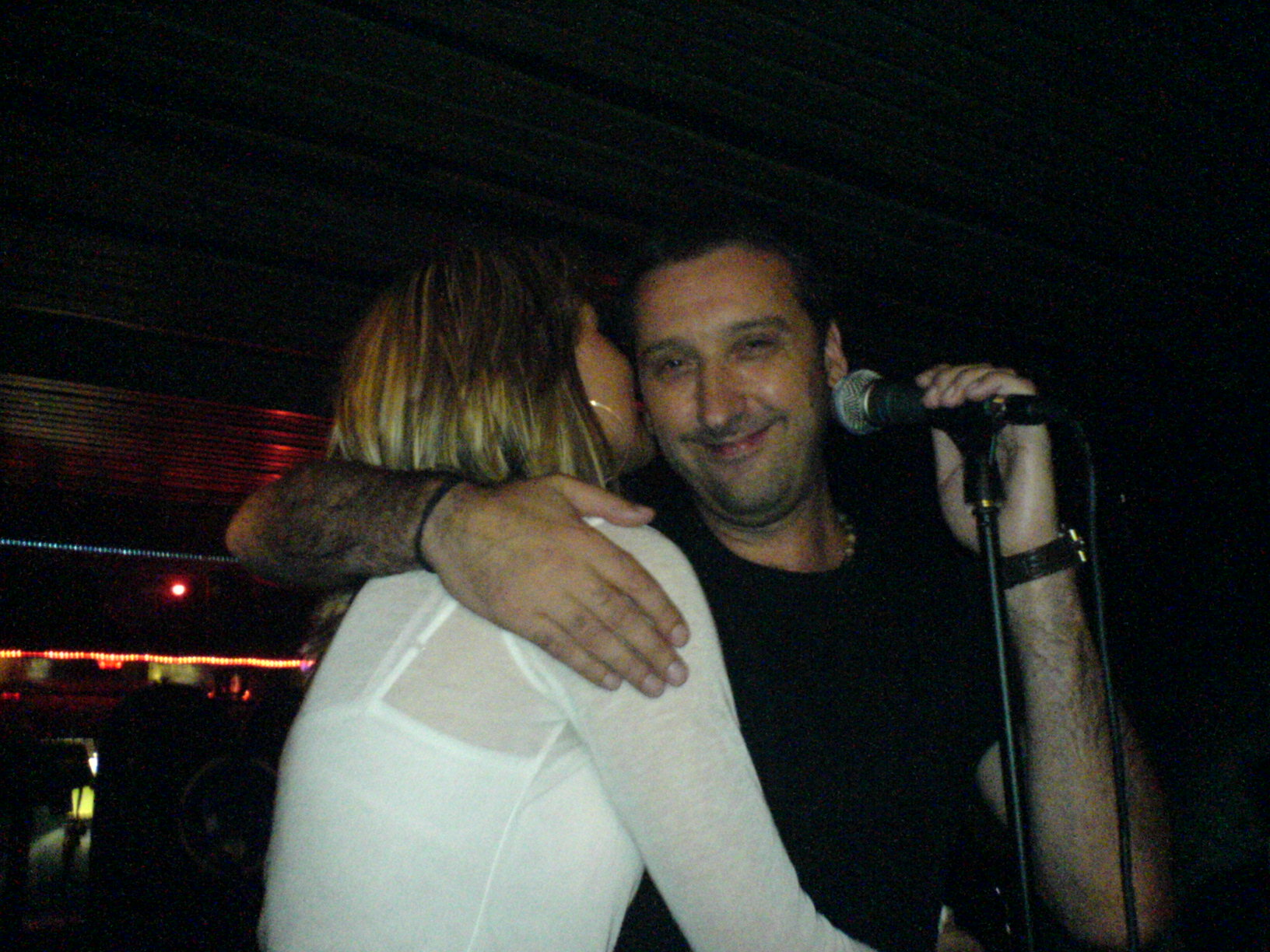
- Hari Mata Hari's lead singer Hari Varešanović (right) in September 2006

Background information
- Origin: Sarajevo, Bosnia and Herzegovina
- Genres: Pop, pop rock, adult contemporary
- Years active: 1984–present
- Labels: Jugoton, Croatia Records, HRT2, BHRT, HAYAT TV, RTS, Hi-Fi Centar, In Takt, Diskoton
- Members: Hari Varešanović; Izudin Kolečić; Adis Vuga; Dženan Selmanagić; Lordan Muzaferija
- Past members: Karlo Martinović; Nihad Voloder; Neno Jeleč; Adi Mulahalilović; Edo Mulahalilović; Miki Bodlović; Pjer Žalica; Zoran Kesić; Željko Zuber
- Website: Official website

Hari Mata Hari is a Bosnian pop band, formed in 1984 in Sarajevo. Their songs are among the most famous and popular love ballads in the former Yugoslavia era. Hari Mata Hari was the representative of Bosnia and Herzegovina at the Eurovision Song Contest 2006 held in Athens, Greece. The group has performed over 1,000 concerts and sold 5 million albums to date.

== History ==
The band, Hari Mata Hari, has constantly changed its members. Today, the group is composed of Hari Varešanović (vocal), Izudin Izo Kolečić (drums), Lordan Muzaferija (bass guitar), Dzenan Selmanagic (electric guitar), and Adis Vuga (keyboards). Most of Hari Mata Hari's songs are arranged by Hajrudin Varešanović. The lyrics are primarily written by Fahrudin Pecikoza - also known as Peco.

Hari grew up in the Vratnik neighborhood of Sarajevo's old town. His grandfather was one of the more well-known singers of traditional Bosnian music called sevdalinka. At the age of six, Hajrudin began to sing and learned to play the guitar. He performed at the local cultural center; at the age of ten he sang with the group "Omi", and later for the group "Sedam šuma". In Vratnik, Hari recorded his first song "Zašto da ne uzmem nju".

In 1979, Hari joined the group Zov with whom he recorded the hit song "Poletjela golubica sa Baščaršije." Next, Varešanović sang with the group "Ambasadori", with whom, it is said, that he matured into a professional artist. After serving his mandatory military service in the town of Niš, he appeared on the music scene by himself releasing the (1984) album Zlatne Kočije.

In September 1985, Hari Varešanović together with the group members of Baobab - Izo Kolečić, Edo Mulahalilović, Pjer Žalica, and Zoran Kesić - won the festival Nove nade, nove snage (New hopes, new strengths) organised by Želimir Altarac Čičak, and created the musical group Hari Mata Hari. That same year, the new group announced the release of their new album U tvojoj kosi (In your hair).

In 1986, Pjer Žalica - "Badžo" and Zoran Kesić left the group. They were replaced by pianist Adi Mulihalilović and bass player Neno Jeleč, who would eventually be replaced by Željko Zuber. Their 1986 album, Ne bi te odbranila ni cijela Jugoslavija (Not even all of Yugoslavia could defend you) was voted as the best album of the year, and Jugovision, the national competition for Eurovision, announced them as the candidate for Yugoslavia. Hari Mata Hari, in 1986, received fifth place for the song "U tvojoj kosi" and fourteenth place for the song "Nebeska kraljica" in 1987 in Belgrade.

1988 brought much prosperity to the group. Hari began to record for the recording company Jugoton, based in Zagreb. The album "Ja te volim najviše na svijetu" (I love you the most in the world) from 1988 sold over 300,000 copies, and carried 10 songs that are still popular (2006) - ("Igrale se delije", "Javi se", "Sedamnaest ti je godina" (You're 17) with Tatjana Matejaš-Tajči, "Naše malo misto", "Ja te volim najviše na svijetu" (I love you the most in the world), "Hej, kako si" (Hey, how are you?), "Zapleši" (Dance), "Kad dođe oktobar" (When October comes), "Ruža bez trna", "Poslednji valcer sa Dunava").

This prosperity was followed by another album called Volio bih da te ne volim (I wish I didn't love you), which sold over 500,000 copies - ("Svi moji drumovi", "Na more dođite" (Come to the sea), "Što je bilo bilo je", "Pazi šta radiš" (Careful what you do) with Matejaš-Tajči). Then in 1990, Hari Mata Hari releases another album called Strah me da te volim (I'm afraid to love you). This album sold over 700,000 copies.

The collapse of Yugoslavia and the wars that ensued, left a mark in Hari Mata Hari's career. In 1991, Edo Mulahalilović left the group to start his own career. In late 1991, the group releases the album Rođena si samo za mene (You were born only for me) through the recording company Diskoton, located in Sarajevo. Some of the songs from the album are: "Ja ne pijem" with Haris Džinović, "Nije za te bekrija", "Nije zima što je zima", that had solid sales and success. With that album, most activity stopped, due to the war in Bosnia and Herzegovina.

In late 1994, the group released another album, while they were refugees in Germany. The album was called Ostaj mi zbogom ljubavi and featured "Bilo je lijepo dok je trajalo" (It was beautiful while it lasted), "Ti si mi droga" (You're my drug), "Ja sam kriv što sam živ", and cover version of song "Poletjela golubica" (The dove flew) with Halid Bešlić. This album was made only by Hari and Izo, the rest of the group would not reunite until 1997-1998. The group was composed of (besides Hari and Izo) Karlo Martinović, Miki Bodlović, Adi Mulihalilović, and Emir Mehić. They returned to the music scene with a greatest hits album called Ja nemam snage da te ne volim (I don't have the strength to not love you), released in 1998 - ("Ne lomi me", "Emina", "Ja nemam snage da te ne volim" (I don't have the strength to not love you), "Gdje li si sada ljubavi" (Where are you now love?), "Upomoć"). The song "Ja nemam snage da te ne volim" sounds like the Sisters Of Mercy's song "This Corrosion".

In 1999, Varešanović was chosen to represent Bosnia and Herzegovina for the Eurovision Song Contest that year. However, he was disqualified due to an issue with the song's status. Hari sold the song "Starac i more" (The old man and the sea) to Finland in 1997 and Finnish artist Janne Hurme recorded that song in Finnish, named "Sydänveri" (Finnish for "Heart Blood"). Dino Merlin, who was the runner up, was sent to Eurovision instead and received seventh place.

Hari, together with Hanka Paldum, recorded the duet "Crni snijeg" (Black snow) in 2001. That same year, the album Baš ti lijepo stoje suze came out with a few hit songs - ("Kao domine" (Like dominoes), "Zjenico oka moga", "Baš ti lijepo stoje suze" (Tears look really good on you)). In 2002 the group released the song "Ruzmarin" (Rosemary), that became an instant hit. Hari Mata Hari was one of the six finalists in the Croatian Radio Festival and represented Bosnia and Herzegovina at the OGAE competition in France. Also, in 2002 Hari Mata Hari won the first Davorin song of the year award, for the song "Kao Domine" (Like dominoes). The music for the song was written by Miki Bodlović and Hari Varešanović, with lyrics by Fahrudin Pecikoza.

In 2003 Hari's song "Idi", brought him to the seventh Croatian Radio Festival. The group competed at the Split festival the same year with the song "Navodno", a duet with Ivana Banfić. After Hari's small concert tour of the Balkans, in Europe, and in Australia, the group began to record a new album. Franjo Valentić, Hari's long time friend, joined the group, while Miki Bodlović left to start his own career in the U.S. and was replaced by Nihad Voloder. At the eighth Hrvatski radijski festival the group competed with the song "Nema čega nema". At the Splitski festival the group entered the competition with the song "Zakon jačega" (Law of the stronger) recorded with Bosnian singer Kemal Monteno. Later that year the group released another album under the name of the song "Zakon jačega", for Sarajevo's Diskoton, Zagreb's Croatia Records, and Belgrade's HI-FI Centar.

In 2007 the group released the single "Zar je to još od nas ostalo".

In 2009 the group released the album "Sreća" (Luck) and this album came out with a few hit songs: "Azra", "Sreća", "Ne mogu ti reći što je tuga" with Croatian singer Nina Badrić, "Tvoje je samo to što daš" with Eldin Husenbegović.

Nihat Voloder left the group and he was replaced by Željko Zuber.

=== Eurovision 2006 ===
PBSBiH, through a public online voting system, chose Hari Mata Hari as the Bosnian representative for Eurovision 2006. BH Eurosong gave the name "Vrijeme je za Bosnu i Hercegovinu" (It's time for Bosnia and Herzegovina), and the song was described as Bosnia's Romeo and Juliet story. The first time the song was aired to the public was on March 5th, 2006 on a special live evening celebration held by "BH Eurosong 06" in the Sarajevo National Theatre. Six days later, Hari sang the song at his first stage appearance in Belgrade on the final evening of Evropesma 2006. The song "Lejla" is a powerful love ballad about far away love. It uses styles of sevdah and local traditional instruments. Eric Clapton and ZZ Top both used the name Leyla in their songs. It is said the title refers to a popular Bosnian song from 1981, when a song called "Lejla" was the Yugoslavian entry to the Eurovision Song Contest. It was sung by Bosnian artist Seid Memić Vajta and reached 15th place in Dublin.

The lyrics of the song were written by Fahrudin Pecikoza and Dejan Ivanović with the music by Željko Joksimović. Joksimović represented Serbia and Montenegro at the Eurovision Song Contest 2004 in Istanbul ("Lane moje", second place), the song was written for non-profit and was solely voluntary. The music video for "Lejla" was directed by Pjer Žalica, along with Hari and the band. It shows many old Bosnian traditions. It was recorded in several areas of Herzegovina: on the mountains of Blidinja and on the national park/lake Hutovo Blato, on Ruištu, and in the city of Mostar. The video ends with the Stari Most, the older part of the city, in the background. The song received its name through on-line voting (with 3501 votes, other name ideas were "Zar bi mogla ti drugog voljeti?" (Could you not love another?) with 660, and "Sakrivena" with 462 votes). Hari Mata Hari won 3rd place at Eurovision Song Contest 2006 with 229 points.

== Group Members ==
=== Current members ===
- Hari Varešanović - vocal
- Adis Vuga - keyboards
- Dzenan Selmanagic - guitar
- Lordan Muzaferija - bass guitar
- Izudin - Izo Kolečić - drums

=== Former members ===
- Željko Zuber – bass guitar (1986–1998)

== Festivals ==
- 2002 – Croatian Radio Festival 2002
- 2003 – Croatian Radio Festival 2003
- 2003 – Split 2003
- 2004 – Croatian Radio Festival 2004
- 2009 – Croatian Radio Festival 2009 /Grand Prix Winner/

== Discography ==
- 1984 – Zlatne kočije - Hari Varešanović's solo album
- 1985 – Skini haljinu
- 1985 – U tvojoj kosi
- 1986 – Ne bi te odbranila ni cijela Jugoslavija
- 1988 – Ja te volim najviše na svijetu
- 1989 – Volio bi' da te ne volim
- 1990 – Strah me da te volim
- 1991 – Rođena si samo za mene
- 1994 – Ostaj mi zbogom ljubavi
- 1998 – Ja nemam snage da te ne volim
- 2001 – Baš ti lijepo stoje suze
- 2002 – Ružmarin
- 2004 – Zakon jačega
- 2009 – Sreća
- 2016 – Ćilim

Preceded by Feminnem with Call Me	Bosnia and Herzegovina in the Eurovision Song Contest; 2006	Succeeded by Marija Šestić with Rijeka bez imena
