= Elvir Laković Laka =

Laka
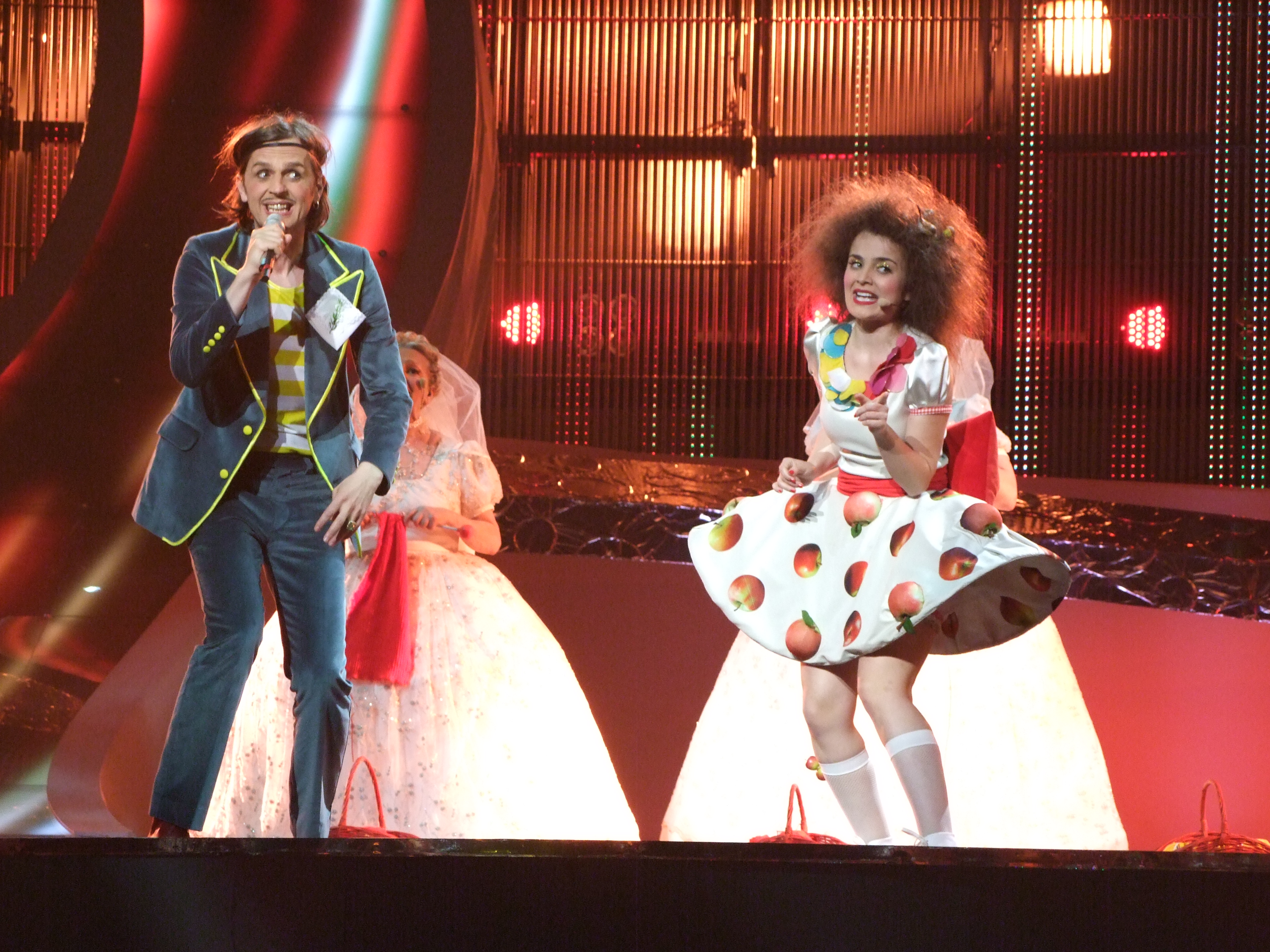
- Laka and his sister performing "Pokušaj" on Eurovision Song Contest 2008

Background information
- Also known as: Laka
- Born: Elvir Laković; 15 March 1969 (age 57); Goražde, SR Bosnia-Herzegovina, SFR Yugoslavia
- Genres: Alternative rock, pop
- Years active: 1998–present
- Label: Hayat Production

Elvir Laković, (a.k.a. Laka; born 15 March 1969), is a Bosnian rock singer-songwriter, born in Goražde, Bosnia and Herzegovina.

== Early life ==
He attended music school there studying guitar, but he disliked the school's teaching methods and views towards music, and then subsequently quit the school. He also studied two years of the occupational health university course in Niš, Serbia, but did not graduate. During the Bosnian war, he was mobilized in the Army of Bosnia and Herzegovina. After the war, he worked for various international organizations for six years. His parents live in Goražde; his father is a lawyer and his mother works for a telecommunications company.

== Career ==
During his early aspiring music career, Laka played popular Bosnian folk songs at café building minor popularity.

Laka recorded his first song "Malo sam se razočar'o" (I'm a little bit disappointed) in 1998. The song turned out to be a major success, and launched his show business career nationally, and then released more songs, among which were "Vještica" (The Witch), "Mor'o" (I had to) and "Piškila" (You've peed yourself), highly increasing his popularity in Bosnia.

In 2003, his song "Ja sam mor'o" (I Had To) won the Bosnian Davorin Music Award for the best rock song of the year. The album Zec has also been released in Croatia on the Menart record label.

In 2004, Laka left for New York City, where he tried to start a band, but returned to Bosnia unsuccessful and a little bit disappointed after two-and-a-half years. However, he then released his first solo album Zec (Rabbit) in 2007.

Laka and his 14 years younger sister Mirela represented Bosnia and Herzegovina at the Eurovision Song Contest 2008 with the song "Pokušaj" ("Try"). Laka was the spokesperson reading out the results from Bosnia and Herzegovina in the Eurovision Song Contest 2009, and again in the Eurovision Song Contest 2012.

== See also ==
- Bosnia and Herzegovina in the Eurovision Song Contest 2008
- Eurovision Song Contest 2008

Preceded by Marija Šestić with Rijeka bez imena	Bosnia and Herzegovina in the Eurovision Song Contest; 2008	Succeeded by Regina with Bistra voda
