= Strah me da te Volim =

Studio album by Hari Mata Hari
- Released: 1990
- Genre: Pop rock
- Label: Jugoton

Hari Mata Hari chronology
Volio bih da te ne volim (1989)	Strah me da te Volim (1990)	Rođena si samo za mene (1991)

Strah me da te Volim ("It frightens me to love you") is the name of the fifth album by the Bosnian band Hari Mata Hari. The album was released in 1990. Commercially, the record was the biggest success for Hari Mata Hari in their entire career.

This album generated a few hit singles: the title track, "Prsten i Zlatni Lanac", "Ostavi suze za Kraj", "Otkud ti k'o Sudbina?", "Nek' nebo nam Sudi", and "Sjeti se Ljeta".

The solo from the eponymous track plagiarises Ennio Morricone's themes "La Resa Dei Conti" and "Addio Colonnello" from Sergio Leone's For a Few Dollars More soundtrack.

== Track listing ==
The tracks on the album are:

1. "Strah me da te Volim"
2. "Prsten i Zlatni Lanac"
3. "Ostavi suze za Kraj"
4. "Lud sam za Tobom"
5. "Ne budi Me"
6. "Odkud ti k'o Sudbina?"
7. "Nek' nebo nam Sudi"
8. "Daj još jednom da Ćujem ti Glas"
9. "Sjeti se Ljeta"
10. "Zakuni se Ożivi Me"

== Contributions ==
- Hari Mata Hari (Hajrudin Varešanović) - vocals
- Edin "Edo" Mulahalilović - guitar
- Adan "Adi" Mulahalilović - keyboards
- Izudin "Izo" Kolećić - percussion, drums
- Željko Zuber - rhythm guitar, bass, songwriting
