= Croatian Top 20 Chart =

The Croatian Top 20 Chart is a Croatian radio show that airs on the HR1 channel of Croatian Radio.

The show first aired in 1985, though it was put on hiatus by the war in Croatia in the early 1990s. Since 1993 and the end of the war, it has been airing continuously. The show has retained the same format, counting down the Top 10 Croatian Singles and Top 10 International Singles.

The founder of the show was Andrej Stengl. From 1993 to 1998, the show was hosted by Silvio Sop, but in 1998 his role was taken over by Dinko Komadina, who has hosted the show ever since.

== About ==
The Chart consists of 10 international and 10 Croatian singles. All songs that enter the charts can stay on the chart for ten weeks and then they are retired and they are sent to archives until the year-end list comes up. The chart is based solely on public voting.
