= Al' Dino =

Bosnia singer

Aldin Kurić (born 21 July 1970), known by his stage name Al'Dino, is a Bosnian singer, songwriter and composer.

== Biography ==
Aldin Kurić was born in Jajce, Bosnia and Herzegovina which was then a part of SFR Yugoslavia, where he enrolled in elementary music school, Department of harmonics, simultaneously playing the piano and guitar. To this day he remains a multi-instrumentalist. At the age of sixteen he randomly got a tape of jazz fusion band Weather Report and decided to start learning bass guitar.

He lived in Jajce until he was eighteen years old and then went into the army. He later studied medicine in Sarajevo. There he met many musicians, including many jazz musicians and played in many jam sessions in the city as a bass guitarist. At the same time, he fell deeply in love with Bosnia's traditional folk songs, Sevdalinka and started to perform them under the name Al'Dino. He became well known by playing in prestigious Sarajevo restaurants and reveals another hidden love for singing. At the beginning of the Bosnian War, he went to Stuttgart, Germany and began playing bass guitar with Bosnian artists such as Dino Merlin, Hari Mata Hari, Halid Bešlić, Safet Isović, Haris Džinović, and many other pop and Bosnian folk singers, and simultaneously studied jazz and played with international musicians at clubs. He played as a "one man band" in German and Italian restaurants and sang in seven languages under the name Al'Dino.

He returned to Bosnia and Herzegovina in 1998 and recorded the first songs for his first solo album, Odlaziš. The title song became the first big hit in Bosnia and Herzegovina.

In 2002, Al'Dino released his second album titled Na drugoj adresi that also featured several hits, "Sanjam bolji svijet", "Sedam godina", "Sve će ovo jednom proći".

His third album, Kopriva, was released in 2004 and is his biggest hit to date was the song of the same name, which crossed the borders of Bosnia, and became a hit in Serbia, Montenegro, and Macedonia. Another song off of the album - "Čaršija", is considered the anthem of Bosnian immigrants. The album Kopriva was proclaimed the album of the year and received the prestigious award "Davorin" at "Grand Prix" Radio Festival in Zenica, eight Bosnian music awards "Oscar popularity," "Hit in 2007" in Serbia. At the Serbia's Radio Festival "Feras" he won first place with the song "K'o ljudi", a duet with Serbian singer Goca Tržan.

The year 2009, marked the release of Al'Dino's fourth album titled, Stariji, in which the ballads "I sad me po tebi poznaju" and "Nikad me se ne spava" a duet with Mostar Sevdah Reunion stand out.

In March 2010, Al'Dino releases the single "Srce se predalo."

At the end of July 2011, he released his fifth album titled Zavjet ljubavi.

He is signed with the record label Hayat Production.

== Albums ==
- Odlaziš (2000)
- Na drugoj adresi (2002)
- Kopriva (2005)
- Stariji (2008)
- Zavjet ljubavi (2011)
