= Maja Tatić =

Serbian Bosnian singer (born 1970)

- Born: Maja Tatić; 30 October 1970 (age 55)
- Origin: Belgrade, Serbia, SFR Yugoslavia
- Genres: pop music
- Years active: 1987 to present
- Website: https://web.archive.org/web/20070523170903/http://www.majatatic.net/

Maja Tatić (Serbian Cyrillic: Маја Татић) (born 30 October 1970 in Belgrade, SFR Yugoslavia) is a Bosnian singer, best known for representing Bosnia and Herzegovina at the Eurovision Song Contest 2002.

== Career ==
At the age of seven, she appeared in a children's contest and started her professional career as a singer when she was 17. Tatić sang in bands such as Monaco, Sonus, and Skitnice.

In 1992, Tatić went to the Canary Islands, where she entertained the people with her renditions of songs by ABBA, Tina Turner and Shania Twain. She performed there for eight years.

Tatić was chosen to represent Bosnia and Herzegovina at the Eurovision Song Contest 2002 with a song "Na jastuku za dvoje" and took joint 13th place, scoring 33 points. After that she participated in several festivals around the Balkans.

She has one daughter.

== Discography ==
=== Albums ===
- 2004: Lagali su me
- 2008: Moja te je duša poznala

| Preceded by Nino Pršeš with Hano | Bosnia and Herzegovina in the Eurovision Song Contest; 2002 | Succeeded by Mija Martina with Ne brini |
