= Marija Šestić =

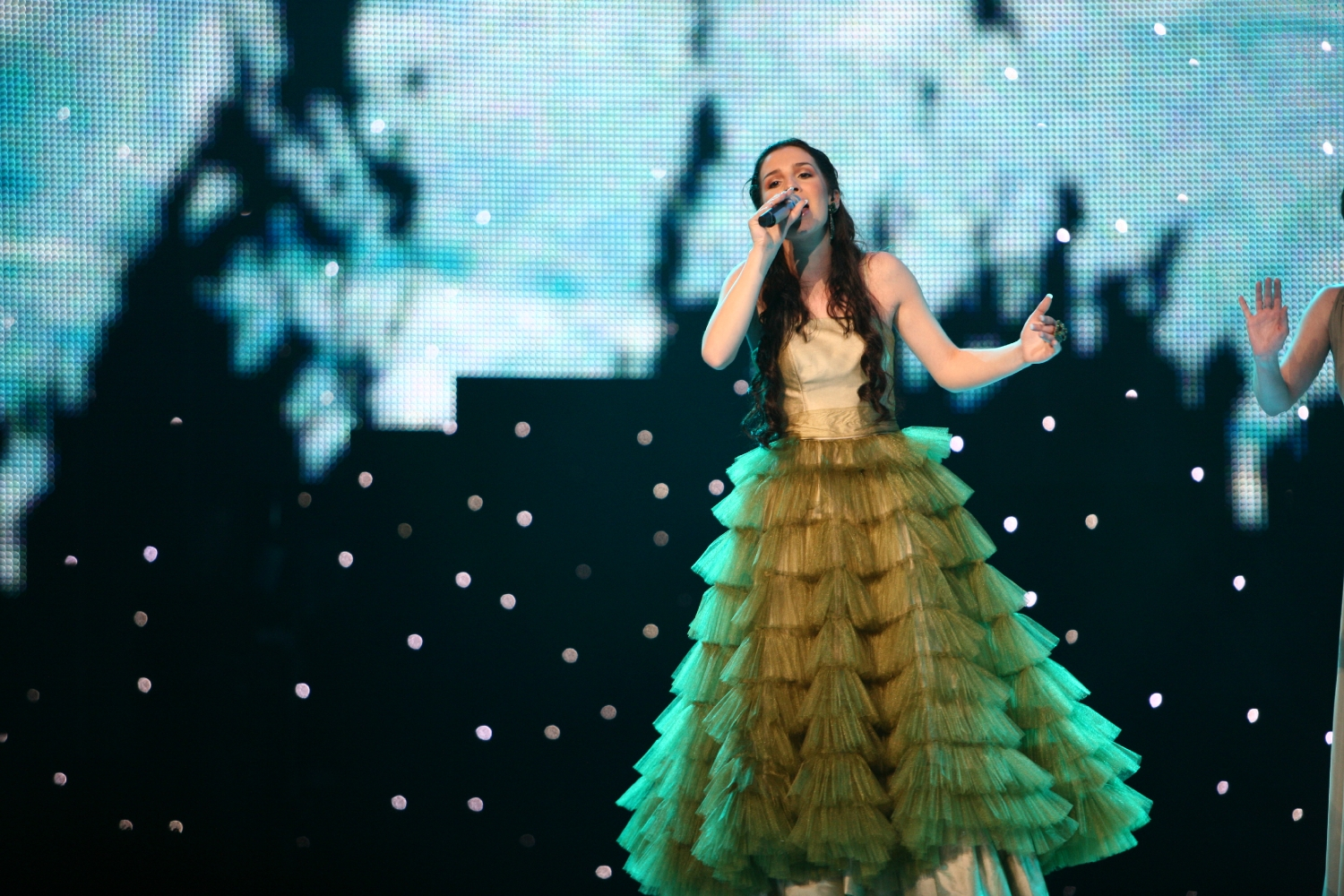
- Marija Šestić at the Eurovision Song Contest 2007

Background information
- Born: Marija Šestić; 5 May 1987 (age 39); Banja Luka, Bosnia and Herzegovina, Yugoslavia
- Instrument: Piano

Marija Šestić (Serbian Cyrillic: Марија Шестић; born 5 May 1987) is a Bosnian singer and musician. She is most known for representing Bosnia and Herzegovina in the Eurovision Song Contest 2007 in Helsinki, Finland. Performing the song "Rijeka bez imena" ("Nameless river"), Šestić collected a total of 106 points, placing eleventh out of twenty-four entries.

== Career ==
A pianist by trade, Šestić has achieved top results in domestic festivals and also had the chance to be the first artist from the former Yugoslavia to appear on MTV Europe. Marija attempted to reach Eurovision in 2005 and with the song "In This World", she ended up in a respectable fourth place at the national final.

== Personal life ==
Šestić's father, Dušan Šestić, is also a musician and composed the national anthem of Bosnia and Herzegovina.

== Music festival wins ==
- Young Talents Festival - Zenica, Bosnia and Herzegovina - 1st Place three years in a row
- St George's Day Festival - Banja Luka, Bosnia and Herzegovina - 3rd Place in 1995, 1st Place in 1996
- "Naša radost" - Podgorica, Montenegro - special award for performance in 1998
- "Zlatno zvonce" - Novi Sad, Vojvodina, Serbia - winner of the first place for performance in 1999
- Banja Luka international pop music festival - Banja Luka, Bosnia and Herzegovina - Best Newcomer Award in 2003
- The Golden Star" international festival - Bucharest, Romania - 1st Prize for Performance in 2004
- Banja Luka international pop music festival - Banja Luka, Bosnia and Herzegovina - 2nd Place in 2005

== See also ==
- Bosnia and Herzegovina in the Eurovision Song Contest 2007

Preceded by Hari Mata Hari with Lejla	Bosnia and Herzegovina in the Eurovision Song Contest; 2007	Succeeded by Elvir Laković Laka with Pokušaj
