= Ana Mirjana Račanović-Jevtić =

Bosnian singer, model and beauty pageant titleholder

- Born: Ana Mirjana Račanović; 1980 (age 44–45)
- Height: 1.80 m (5 ft 11 in)

Ana Mirjana Račanović-Jevtić (Serbo-Croatian Cyrillic: Ана Мирјана Рачановић-Јевтић; born Ana Mirjana Račanović, c. 1980) is a Bosnian singer, model and beauty pageant titleholder. She was Miss Bosnia and Herzegovina in 2001 and competed at the Miss World contest of the same year. Her hometown is Bijeljina, Bosnia and Herzegovina. She is married and living in Rastatt, Baden-Württemberg, Germany with her husband Alen Jevtić.

She was spokesperson for Bosnia and Herzegovina in the Eurovision Song Contest in 2005.
