= Igor Vukojević =

Bosnian singer, musician and songwriter (born 1975)

Igor Vukojević (born 1975 in Doboj, SR Bosnia and Herzegovina, SFR Yugoslavia) is a Bosnian singer, musician and songwriter.

Igor started playing guitar when he was 10 years old, composed his first song when he was 11 and did his first song arrangement at 14 years old. By that time he already played 3 instruments - drums, bass and guitar.

Vukojević has participated in the Bosnian national selection for the Eurovision Song Contest three times, finishing ninth in 1999 and third in 2003 and 2005. He also participated in the semi-final of its Serbian counterpart, Beovizija, in 2007, finishing last (20th).

== Discography ==
- Rat i mir (1996)
- Samo ona (2001)
- Ringišpil (2003)
- Bijelo zlato (2006)
- Lovac i plijen (2010)
