= Bosnia and Herzegovina in the Eurovision Song Contest 1999 =

- Eurovision Song Contest 1999
- Participating broadcaster: Radiotelevision of Bosnia-Herzegovina (RTVBiH)
- Country: Bosnia and Herzegovina
- Selection process: Internal selection among Vaš šlager sezone 1999 entries
- Announcement date: 17 April 1999

Competing entry
- Song: "Putnici"
- Artist: Dino and Béatrice
- Songwriter: Edin Dervišhalidović

Placement
- Final result: 7th, 86 points

Participation chronology

Bosnia and Herzegovina was represented at the Eurovision Song Contest 1999 with the song "Putnici" written by Edin Dervišhalidović, and performed by Dervišhalidović himself and Béatrice Poulot as Dino and Béatrice. The Bosnian-Herzegovinian participating broadcaster, Radiotelevision of Bosnia-Herzegovina (RTVBiH), organised the national final Vaš šlager sezone 1999 in order to select its entry for the contest. The broadcaster returned to the contest after a one-year absence following its relegation in 1998 as one of the six entrants with the lowest average scores over the previous five contests.

Seventeen entries participated in the national final on 6 March 1999 where nine regional juries initially selected "Starac i more" performed by Hari Mata Hari as the winner, however the entry was later disqualified due to the song having previously been released in Finland in 1997 with runner-up "Putnici" performed by Dino and Béatrice being replaced as the Bosnian-Herzegovinian entry for the contest.

Bosnia and Herzegovina competed in the Eurovision Song Contest which took place on 29 May 1999. Performing during the show in position 22, Bosnia and Herzegovina placed seventh out of the 23 participating countries, scoring 86 points.

== Background ==
Prior to the 1999 contest, Radiotelevision of Bosnia-Herzegovina (RTVBiH) had participated in the Eurovision Song Contest representing Bosnia and Herzegovina six times since its first entry in 1993. Its best placing in the contest was fifteenth, achieved in 1994 with the song " Ostani kraj mene" performed by Alma Čardžić and Dejan Lazarević. Its least successful result has been 22nd place, which they have achieved in 1996.

As part of its duties as participating broadcaster, RTVBiH organises the selection of its entry in the Eurovision Song Contest and broadcasts the event in the country. From 1994 to 1997, the broadcaster selected its artist through an internal selection process, while a national final was set up to choose the song. RTVBiH selected its entry in 1999 through a national final that featured several artists and songs.

== Before Eurovision ==
=== Vaš šlager sezone 1999 ===
RTVBiH held the thirty-second edition of Vaš šlager sezone on 6 March at the Skenderija Hall in Sarajevo and hosted by Segmedina Srna and Lejla Babović. The show was broadcast on BHTV1.

==== Competing entries ====
74 submissions were received during a submission period where artists and composers to submit their entries in one of the official languages of Bosnia and Herzegovina. The broadcaster selected eighteen entries to compete in the national final, one of them which was later withdrawn. Among the competing artists was Seid Memić-Vajta, who represented Yugoslavia in 1981, while Amina, who represented France in 1991, was initially announced to be performing in a duet with Dino Dervišhalidović but was later replaced by Béatrice Poulot.

==== Final ====
The final was held on 6 March 1999. Seventeen entries participated and the votes from nine regional juries, eight located in Bosnia and Herzegovina and one located in Bonn, Germany, selected "Starac i more" performed by Hari Mata Hari as the winner. In addition to the performances of the competing entries, the show was opened with a guest performance by past Bosnian-Herzegovinian Eurovision entrant Davorin Popović (1995), while Popović, Fazla (1993), Alma Čardžić (1994 and 1997), and Amila Glamočak (1996) performed as the interval acts.

Winner

R/O	Artist	Song	Songwriter(s)	Points	Place
1	Eldin Huseinbegović	"Volio obolio"	Nesib Delibegović	13	13
2	Beat House	"Kunem te ja"	Mahir Sulejmanović	39	6
3	Krug	"U ritmu novom"	Jasminka Glimac, Osman Garagić	33	8
4	Seven Up	"Daj, spusti se"	Zoltan Milić, Gordan Radić	58	3
5	Dražen Žerić	"Proveo bi život ispod mostova"	Zlatan Fazlić	16	12
6	Dunja Galineo and Nurudin Vatrenjak	"Budi tu"	Nurudin Vatrenjak, Zlatan Burzić	0	17
7	Sarajevo Old Stars	"Šampion"	Saša Lošić	51	4
8	Zejnaida Mesihović	"Dala bih ti život"	Zejnaida Mesihović, Faruk Kadić	38	7
9	Željka Katavić-Pilj	"Bog mi je svjedok"	Jasminko Šetka, Aleksandar Popov, Miroslav Plij	40	5
10	Sanja Volić	"Jedini, ljubim te"	Mladen Vidović	10	14
11	Seid Memić-Vajta	"Stare melodije"	Edin Tahirović	19	11
12	Elvana Dučić	"Priznat ću ti sve"	Elvana Dučić	7	16
13	Hari Mata Hari	"Starac i more"	Fahrudin Pecikoza, Hari Varešanović	70	1
14	Dino Dervišhalidović and Béatrice	"Putnici"	Edin Dervišhalidović	65	2
15	Igor	"Glumica"	Igor Vukojević, Vladimir Vukojević	28	9
16	Sarajevska Ruža	"Želja"	Slobodan Ćosić	10	14
17	Andrej and Romana	"Ostavi suze"	Zoran Šugić	25	10

Detailed Regional Jury Votes
Draw	Song	Banja Luka	Bihać	Bonn	Goražde	Livno	Mostar	Sarajevo	Tuzla	Zenica	Total
1	"Volio obolio"				7	1				5	13
2	"Kunem te ja"	8	4		4	12	4	5	2		39
3	"U ritmu novom"	1	12		6	4		6		4	33
4	"Daj, spusti se"	10	3	7		6		12	8	12	58
5	"Proveo bi život ispod mostova"	2		6	3		5				16
6	"Budi tu"										0
7	"Šampion"	4	8	8			10	2	12	7	51
8	"Dala bih ti život"	5			5	3	8	8	7	2	38
9	"Bog mi je svjedok"		5	4	12		12	7			40
10	"Jedini, ljubim te"		1			5		3	1		10
11	"Stare melodije"	3		5	1		2			6	19
12	"Priznat ću ti sve"					2	1	1	3		7
13	"Starac i more"	7	10	10	10	10	7		6	10	70
14	"Putnici"		6	12	8	8	3	10	10	8	65
15	"Glumica"	6	7	3	2		6	4			28
16	"Želja"			2					5	3	10
17	"Ostavi suze"	12		1		7			4	1	25

=== Disqualification and replacement ===
Following the Bosnian-Herzegovinian national final, it was reported that "Starac i more" would be disqualified as the song had previously been released in 1997 by Finnish singer Janne Hurme under the title "Sydänveri". Confirmation of its disqualification was announced on 17 April 1999 during the BHTV1 news programme Dnevnik, along with the announcement that runner-up of the national final, "Putnici" performed by Dino and Béatrice, would represent Bosnia and Herzegovina at the contest.

Hari Mata Hari would later represent Bosnia and Herzegovina in 2006 with the song "Lejla", placing third in the final.

== At Eurovision ==
According to Eurovision rules, the 23-country participant list for the contest was composed of: the previous year's winning country and host nation, the seventeen countries which had obtained the highest average points total over the preceding five contests, and any eligible countries which did not compete in the 1998 contest Bosnia and Herzegovina was one of the eligible countries which did not compete in the 1998 contest, and thus were permitted to participate. On 17 November 1998, a special allocation draw was held which determined the running order and Bosnia and Herzegovina was set to perform in position 22, following the entry from the Germany and before the entry from Estonia. Bosnia and Herzegovina finished in seventh place with 86 points.

It was the highest ranking Bosnia and Herzegovina had received in the Contest up to that time, and it will remain so until 2006, when Hari Mata Hari, the original winners of this year's national final, were selected to represent Bosnia and Herzegovina with the song "Lejla", where they came third.

Despite high placement, Bosnia and Herzegovina had low average score over the past 5 contests, and so was still forced to skip the 2000 contest. It would return to Eurovision in 2001.

The show was broadcast in Bosnia and Herzegovina on BHTV1 with commentary by Ismeta Dervoz-Krvavac. RTVBiH appointed Segmedina Srna as its spokesperson to announce the Bosnian-Herzegovinian votes during the show.

=== Voting ===
Below is a breakdown of points awarded to and by Bosnia and Herzegovina in the contest. The Bosnian-Herzegovinian jury awarded its 12 points to the contest winner Sweden.

Points awarded to Bosnia and Herzegovina
Score	Country
12 points	Austria
10 points	Croatia; Slovenia
8 points	Denmark; Germany
7 points	Norway; Turkey
6 points	France; Sweden
5 points	Poland
4 points	
3 points	Iceland; Netherlands
2 points	
1 point	Belgium

Points awarded by Bosnia and Herzegovina
Score	Country
12 points	Sweden
10 points	Germany
8 points	Croatia
7 points	Malta
6 points	Poland
5 points	Slovenia
4 points	Netherlands
3 points	Estonia
2 points	Israel
1 point	United Kingdom
