= Mija Martina =

- Born: 26 April 1984 (age 40); Mostar, SR Bosnia and Herzegovina, SFR Yugoslavia
- Occupation(s): singer, TV host

Mija Martina Barbarić (born 26 April 1984) is a Bosnian Croat singer and TV host from Bosnia and Herzegovina who used to work as a spokeswoman for the Ministry of Tourism and Environment of Federation of Bosnia and Herzegovina.

She represented Bosnia and Herzegovina in the Eurovision Song Contest 2003 with the song "Ne brini". She also provided the results of the Bosnia and Herzegovina televote in the Eurovision Song Contest 2004.

She was also organizer of special events during the biggest Economy Fair in Mostar (for Mostar Inc.) for 10 years.

Barbarić was accused of neo-Nazi sympathies after she wrote on her Facebook profile Za dom spremni, controversial salute used by the fascist Ustaše movement in Croatia during World War II as equivalent of the Nazi salute Sieg heil.

Preceded by Maja Tatić with Na jastuku za dvoje	Bosnia and Herzegovina in the Eurovision Song Contest; 2003	Succeeded by Deen with In The Disco
