= Amila Glamočak =

Bosnian singer (born 1966)

- Born: Amila Čengić; 19 July 1966 (age 60); Sarajevo, SR Bosnia and Herzegovina, SFRY
- Genres: Pop

Amila Glamočak (née Čengić; Serbo-Croatian Cyrillic: Амила Гламочак; born 19 July 1966 in Sarajevo, Bosnia and Herzegovina, Yugoslavia) is a Bosnian singer. She participated in the Eurovision Song Contest 1996 with the song "Za našu ljubav" for Bosnia and Herzegovina, finishing 22nd out of 23. She appeared in the Bosnian national final on two other occasions (2001 and 2003) but failed to qualify. She now lives in Turkey and is remarried.

Preceded by Davorin Popović with Dvadeset prvi vijek	Bosnia and Herzegovina in the Eurovision Song Contest; 1996	Succeeded by Alma Čardžić with Goodbye
