= Tinka Milinović =

- Born: 27 November 1973 (age 52); Sarajevo, SR Bosnia and Herzegovina, SFR Yugoslavia
- Genres: Classical music, opera, pop, jazz, dance-pop, club
- Occupations: Singer, television host, TV executive producer and show creator, personality, opera singer, songwriter, author, entrepreneur, record producer, radio host, model, actress, dancer
- Instruments: Voice, flute, piano, guitar
- Years active: 2002–present
- Labels: Big Best Company, Chips, Edel, Phonag

Tinka Milinović Pichler (Serbo-Croatian Cyrillic: Тинка Милиновић Пихлер; born 27 November 1973) is a Bosnian-American recording artist.

== Early life ==
Milinović was born in Sarajevo, SFR Yugoslavia. She was raised by her mother Janja, father Drago Ivan, and an older brother, Dren. In 1991 she moved to the United States on her own as a high school exchange student.

== Education and classical music ==
In 1992 Milinović entered Louisiana College to study Vocal Performance/Opera with Dr. Loryn E. Frey. She graduated with Cum Laude honors with a Bachelor of Music degree in 1996.

In 1998, Milinović received a Master of Music degree in Opera/Vocal Performance from the University of Louisiana at Lafayette where she held a graduate teaching assistant position in the School of Music.

Starting at age 18, Milinović represented herself before the U.S. immigration system and became a U.S. citizen.

Milinović performed in different operas both in the United States and Sarajevo, as well as musicals, recitals, and opera scenes. Additionally while a scholar in Louisiana, she further trained her voice with the Metropolitan Opera primadonna Martina Arroyo from New York. Apart from these stage roles, Milinović also held solo concerts and has collaborated with Acadiana Symphony Orchestra and Sarajevo Philharmonics.

== Music career ==
Milinović competed at the Bosnia-Herzegovina Eurovision Song Contest national final with the song "Sve što imaš ti" (2002). Milinović's profile increased and resulted in her receiving offers to host her own TV and radio shows, as well as a lead role in Emerich Kalman's "Die Czardas Fürstin" at Sarajevo Opera.

Milinović further went on to Eurovision Song Contest 2002 in Tallinn, Estonia, as a backing vocalist and dancer to the Bosnia-Herzegovina representative that year.

After competing in Bosnia-Herzegovinian national selections for the Eurovision Song Contest with songs "I’m Never Gonna Fall" (2003), and "Sometimes I Wish I Were a Child Again" (2005), Milinović went on to represent Switzerland at Eurovision Song Contest 2006 finals in Athens, Greece with the song "If We All Give A Little" as a member of the group Six4One gathered by Schweizer Fernsehen. They released an album with 17 songs in English for the foreign market entitled “If We All Give A Little” (2006 CHIPS RECORDS, EDEL, PHONAG).

Her solo pop album T.I.N.K.A was released soon afterwards and was nominated in all 6 categories for Bosnian Music Awards 2007: Pop Album, Pop Song, Pop Video, Pop Artist of the Year, The Best New Artist, and the Best Female Performance.

Tinka Milinović foray into the world of jazz performances is documented in series of concerts in Austria and Balkans.

== Television ==
Milinović's television career started overnight after TV producers saw her Eurovision 2002 performance and offered her to host TV Bingo Show, a live prime time evening show on Federal Television (FTV) of Bosnia and Herzegovina that soon became the highest rated television show in the country. Tinka Milinović became a household name and hosted TV show for 6 years. During this time, Milinović also hosted TV show Summer with FTV also airing live on FTV, and she was a television host for Knotika TV, Dubai, UAE. She created, produced and hosted The Tinka Show on Federalna televizija in 2019 and run successfully all throughout her late pregnancy. The TV show is an entertaining educational talk show that inspires and supports viewers to explore the world they live in, without fear, prejudice and stereotypes, through conversations with women of different ages, professions and interests.

== Radio ==
For three years, Milinović hosted Tinka's Show – No Offense on the national radio station of Bosnia and Herzegovina (BH Radio 1). The show ran on Tuesday evenings and was heard all over Europe and the Internet. It was particularly popular among women due to Tinka's broadening women's perspectives, surpassing the limits, and breaking the molds of society.

== Author ==
Tinka Milinović released the book The Success Secret in collaboration with Jack Canfield. The book hit seven separate best-seller lists on the day of its release cementing her place among the best-selling authors. Milinović was also a contributing author for #1 Middle Eastern female fashion magazine U Magazine in Jordan and Beirut, Lebanon, and British HEIR Magazine. Her writings cover topics related to women empowerment, relationships, love, lifestyle, and travel.

== Personal life ==
Presently residing in West Hollywood, California, Milinović is working on The Tinka Show targeting the US audience and international television markets. She is developing a docu-reality show based on her life story in Louisiana.

== Discography ==
- T.I.N.K.A (2007 Big Best Company)
- six4one "If We All Give a Little" (2006 Chips Records, Edel, Phonag Records)

Awards and achievements
Preceded by Vanilla Ninja with "Cool Vibes"	Switzerland in the Eurovision Song Contest (as part of six4one); 2006	Succeeded by DJ Bobo with "Vampires Are Alive"
