= Bosnia and Herzegovina in the Eurovision Song Contest 1996 =

- Eurovision Song Contest 1996
- Participating broadcaster: Radiotelevision of Bosnia-Herzegovina (RTVBiH)
- Country: Bosnia and Herzegovina
- Selection process: Artist: Internal selection Song: BH Eurosong 1996
- Selection date: 7 March 1996

Competing entry
- Song: "Za našu ljubav"
- Artist: Amila Glamočak
- Songwriters: Sinan Alimanović; Adnan Bajramović; Aida Frljak

Placement
- Final result: 22nd, 13 points

Participation chronology

Bosnia and Herzegovina was represented at the Eurovision Song Contest 1996 with the song "Za našu ljubav", written by Sinan Alimanović, Adnan Bajramović, and Aida Frljak, and performed by Amila Glamočak. The Bosnian-Herzegovinian participating broadcaster, Radiotelevision of Bosnia-Herzegovina (RTVBiH), selected its entry for the contest through a national final, after having previously selected the performer internally. They finished on 22nd place out of 23 countries with 13 points. It was the worst result for Bosnia and Herzegovina until 2016.

== Before Eurovision ==
=== BH Eurosong 1996 ===
Radiotelevision of Bosnia-Herzegovina (RTVBiH) internally selected Amila Glamočak as its representative for the Eurovision Song Contest 1996. A total of 23 songs were submitted to the competition, and 8 were selected to be performed by Amila at the national final. RTVBiH held the national final on 7 March 1996 at its television studios in Sarajevo, hosted by Segmedina Srna. All of the songs were sung by Amila Glamočak and the winner was chosen by an expert jury.

Final – 7 March 1996
R/O	Song	Songwriter(s)
1	"Na istoj smo strani"	Dubravko Milišić
2	"Ne trebaš mi"	Goran Radić, Branko Vekić
3	"Nije slučajno"	Admir Đulančić, Miroslav Plij
4	"Moja savjest"	Amir Bjelanović, Zlatan Fazlić
5	"Ja sam rijeka"	Sinan Alimanović, Mirjana Ćosić Bejtović
6	"Muzika za laku noć"	Dubravko Milišić
7	"Ja znam"	Zlatan Alispahić
8	"Za našu ljubav"	Sinan Alimanović, Adnan Bajramović, Aida Frljak

== At Eurovision ==
In 1996, for the only time in Eurovision history, an audio-only qualifying round of the 29 songs entered (excluding hosts Norway who were exempt) was held in March in order for the seven lowest-scoring songs to be eliminated before the final. "Za našu ljubav" placed 21st with 29 points, thus qualifying for the final.

On the night of the final Amila Glamočak performed 21st in the running order, following Poland and preceding Slovakia. At the end of the voting, Bosnia and Herzegovina received 13 points (highest being 6 from Turkey) placing 22nd out of 23 entries, ahead of only Finland. It would be the worst result for Bosnia and Herzegovina until 2016.

The Bosnian jury awarded its 12 points to contest winners Ireland.

=== Voting ===
==== Qualifying round ====
Points awarded to Bosnia and Herzegovina (qualifying round)
Score	Country
12 points	Slovenia
10 points	
8 points	
7 points	
6 points	Croatia
5 points	
4 points	
3 points	Germany; Spain
2 points	Malta; Switzerland
1 point	Finland

Points awarded by Bosnia and Herzegovina (qualifying round)
Score	Country
12 points	Ireland
10 points	Sweden
8 points	Turkey
7 points	Croatia
6 points	Austria
5 points	Iceland
4 points	Denmark
3 points	Switzerland
2 points	Slovakia
1 point	Hungary

==== Final ====
Points awarded to Bosnia and Herzegovina (final)
Score	Country
12 points	
10 points	
8 points	
7 points	
6 points	Turkey
5 points	
4 points	
3 points	Croatia; Malta
2 points	
1 point	Finland

Points awarded by Bosnia and Herzegovina (final)
Score	Country
12 points	Ireland
10 points	Croatia
8 points	Slovenia
7 points	Poland
6 points	Austria
5 points	Turkey
4 points	Sweden
3 points	Norway
2 points	Netherlands
1 point	Portugal
