= Koševo City Stadium =

Stadium in Sarajevo, Bosnia and Herzegovina

Stadion Koševo
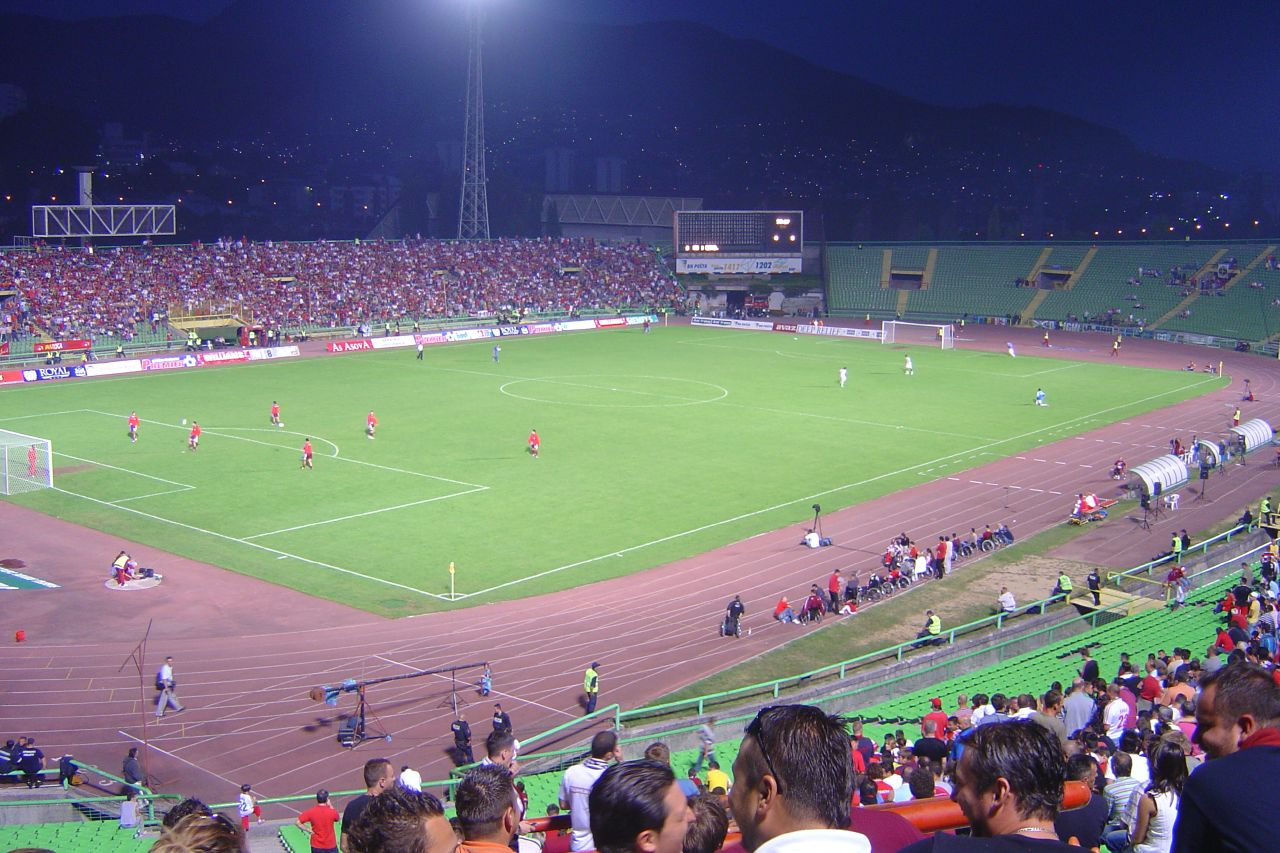
- UEFA
- Interactive map of Stadion Koševo
- Full name: City Stadium Koševo
- Location: Betanija, Centar, Sarajevo, Bosnia and Herzegovina
- Coordinates: 43°52′26″N 18°24′31″E
- Owner: Centar Municipality
- Operator: Municipality; FK Sarajevo on long-term lease by Centar Municipality
- Capacity: 34,700
- Surface: Hybrid grass
- Scoreboard: LED
- Record attendance: 55.000 (FK Sarajevo vs FK Željezničar, 10.3.1982)
- Field size: 105 x 68 m (114.8 x 74.4 yd)

Construction
- Groundbreaking: 1946
- Opened: 1947
- Renovated: 1984, 1996, 2023
- Expanded: 1984

Tenants
- FK Sarajevo (1947–present); FK Željezničar (1968–1976); Bosnia and Herzegovina (selected matches)

Koševo Stadium (Bosnian: Stadion Koševo), also Koševo Olympic Stadium (Olimpijski stadion Koševo), or Stadium Asim Ferhatović - Hase (Stadion Asim Ferhatović Hase) for football and track-and-field and other events hosted by FK Sarajevo, is a multi-purpose stadium located in the Koševo neighborhood of Sarajevo, Bosnia and Herzegovina. The largest stadium in Bosnia and Herzegovina, it hosted the opening ceremony of the 1984 Winter Olympics.

== Name and ownership ==
The stadium is constructed and owned by the City of Sarajevo until ownership was transferred to municipality of Centar, Sarajevo, and leased on long-term basis to football club FK Sarajevo, and also to FK Željezničar on periods between 1968 and 1976, and in other occasions when Grbavica Stadium was unavailable. In July 2004, FK Sarajevo proposed that stadium be named in honor to its former footballer and club's legend, Asim Ferhatović, for all sporting and football events hosted by the club.

== Construction ==
Construction works started in 1947. The stadium was literally buried into a local hill thus merging with its natural surroundings. In 1950, a pitch and a tartan track were also added. The stadium was opened in the year 1947. In 1966, it was renovated for the Balkan athletic championship, when a new administration building was built, the new locker rooms and a restaurant. A modern scoreboard and new lighting were also put in place.

In 1984, it was completely rebuilt for the 1984 Winter Olympics, which earned it the epithet Olympic Stadium. The stadium was renovated for the third time after the Bosnian War, in 1998. By adding the chairs on every stand, the seating capacity of the stadium was reduced to 34,500. Today, the total capacity of Koševo is 34,500 seats, and up to 70,000 for musical and various public events.

== History ==
=== Sporting events ===
The first international football match, between Yugoslavia and Turkey, was played in 1954.

In 1966, the stadium hosted the Balkan athletic championship, and again in 1996 athletic Solidarity meeting.

Throughout its football history, the stadium was usually a home ground for FK Sarajevo's and FK Željezničar's international matches. The Sarajevo audience witnessed many great matches against Europe's finest clubs such as Manchester United, Dynamo Kyiv, Derby County, Basel, Hamburger SV, Newcastle United, Celtic etc.

The stadium's largest attendance was recorded in a 1981–82 Yugoslav First League match between Sarajevo and Željezničar. Allegedly, up to 60,000 people attended the game, though the exact number was never officially published.

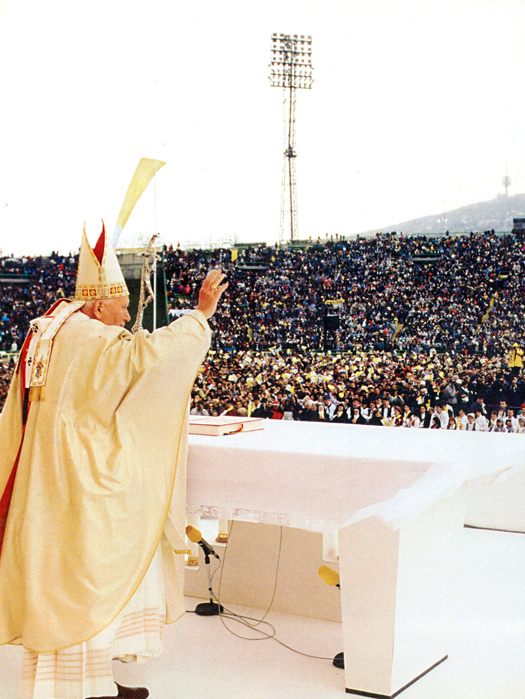
Pope John Paul II at Koševo Stadium 1997

In April 2021, the stadium was leased to FK Sarajevo for operating the stadium for the next 30 to 45 years. The stadium is also the home stadium in selected matches for the Bosnia and Herzegovina national football team.

=== Other public events ===
The Stadium Koševo hosted many concerts, such as U2's concert as part of their PopMart Tour in 1997 and Dino Merlin's Burek tour in 2004 and Hotel Nacional in 2015. The venue hosted papal pastoral visitations twice, first by Pope John Paul II between 12–13 April 1997, and then by Pope Francis on 6 June 2015.

== 1984 Winter Olympics opening ==
On 7 February 1984, the Koševo stadium hosted the opening ceremonies of the 1984 Winter Olympics for which it was thoroughly renovated and expanded. About 50,000 people attended the ceremonies. The west stand held 18,500 seating places at that time.

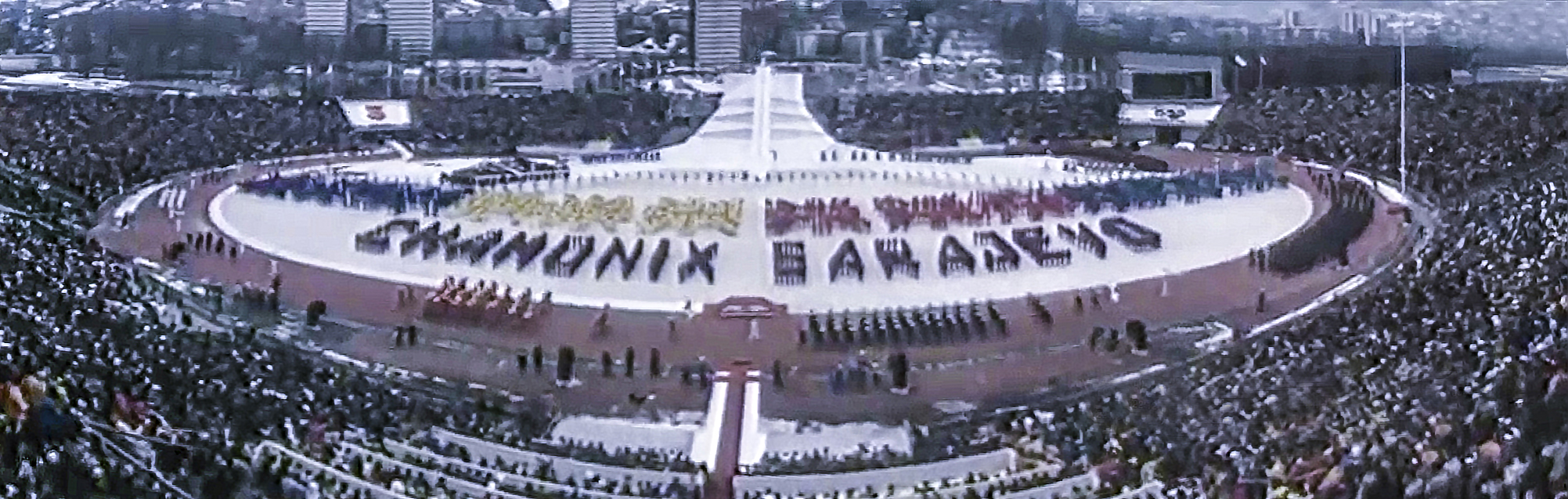
Panoramic view of Koševo Stadium during the 1984 Winter Olympics opening ceremony.

== Notable events ==
=== International football matches ===
Date	Home team	Result	Away team	Competition
17 October 1954	Yugoslavia	5–1	Turkey	Friendly
8 April 1970	Yugoslavia	1–1	Austria	Friendly
22 September 1971	Yugoslavia	4–0	Mexico	Friendly
22 March 1980	Yugoslavia	2–1	Uruguay	Friendly
1 June 1983	Yugoslavia	1–0	Romania	Friendly
23 April 1985	Yugoslavia	0–0	France	1986 FIFA World Cup qualifying
11 October 1989	Yugoslavia	1–0	Norway	1990 FIFA World Cup qualifying
6 November 1996	Bosnia and Herzegovina	2–1	Italy	Friendly
2 April 1997	Bosnia and Herzegovina	0–1	Greece	1998 FIFA World Cup qualifying
20 August 1997	Bosnia and Herzegovina	3–0	Denmark	1998 FIFA World Cup qualifying
10 September 1997	Bosnia and Herzegovina	1–0	Slovenia	1998 FIFA World Cup qualifying
12 August 1998	Bosnia and Herzegovina	1–0	Faroe Islands	Euro 2000 qualifying
5 September 1998	Bosnia and Herzegovina	1–1	Estonia	Euro 2000 qualifying
10 October 1998	Bosnia and Herzegovina	1–3	Czech Republic	Euro 2000 qualifying
5 June 1999	Bosnia and Herzegovina	2–0	Lithuania	Euro 2000 qualifying
4 September 1999	Bosnia and Herzegovina	1–2	Scotland	Euro 2000 qualifying
25 April 2000	Bosnia and Herzegovina	0–1	FIFA XI	Friendly
16 August 2000	Bosnia and Herzegovina	2–0	Turkey	Friendly
2 September 2000	Bosnia and Herzegovina	1–2	Spain	2002 FIFA World Cup qualifying
24 March 2001	Bosnia and Herzegovina	1–1	Austria	2002 FIFA World Cup qualifying
15 August 2001	Bosnia and Herzegovina	2–0	Malta	Friendly
1 September 2001	Bosnia and Herzegovina	0–0	Israel	2002 FIFA World Cup qualifying
21 August 2002	Bosnia and Herzegovina	0–2	FR Yugoslavia	Friendly
7 September 2002	Bosnia and Herzegovina	0–3	Romania	Euro 2004 qualifying
11 October 2002	Bosnia and Herzegovina	1–1	Germany	Friendly
11 October 2003	Bosnia and Herzegovina	1–1	Denmark	Euro 2004 qualifying
9 October 2004	Bosnia and Herzegovina	0–0	Serbia and Montenegro	2006 FIFA World Cup qualifying
30 March 2005	Bosnia and Herzegovina	0–0	Lithuania	2006 FIFA World Cup qualifying
16 August 2006	Bosnia and Herzegovina	1–2	France	Friendly
2 June 2007	Bosnia and Herzegovina	3–2	Turkey	Euro 2008 qualifying
6 June 2007	Bosnia and Herzegovina	1–0	Malta	Euro 2008 qualifying
22 August 2007	Bosnia and Herzegovina	3–5	Croatia	Friendly
12 September 2007	Bosnia and Herzegovina	0–1	Moldova	Euro 2008 qualifying
17 October 2007	Bosnia and Herzegovina	0–2	Norway	Euro 2008 qualifying
12 August 2009	Bosnia and Herzegovina	2–3	Iran	Friendly
3 March 2010	Bosnia and Herzegovina	2–1	Ghana	Friendly
7 September 2010	Bosnia and Herzegovina	0–2	France	Euro 2012 qualifying
10 August 2011	Bosnia and Herzegovina	0–0	Greece	Friendly
14 August 2013	Bosnia and Herzegovina	3–4	United States	Friendly
12 November 2020	Bosnia and Herzegovina	0–2	Iran	Friendly
29 May 2026	Bosnia and Herzegovina	0–0	North Macedonia	Friendly

=== Notable club friendlies and exhibition matches ===
Date	Home team	Result	Away team	Occasion	Notes
17 March 1965	(Socialist Federal Republic of Yugoslavia) FK Sarajevo	1–2	Soviet Union	USSR's Yugoslav Tour	— Sarajevo: Muftić (Sirćo), Fazlagić, Vujović, Prljača (Šehović), Biogradlić, Ristić, Čerkić, Smajlović, Ferhatović (Blažević), Osim, and Mušović (Šiljkut) — USSR: Yashin, Chertkov, Shesternyov, Ponomaryov, Voronin, Shustikov, Chislenko, Kazakov, Metreveli, Logofet, and Meskhi — scorers: 0:1 Metreveli (15th min), 0:2 Kazakov (51st min), 1:2 Šehović (67th min) — attendance: ~40,000 — FK Željezničar players Ivica Osim and Mišo Smajlović played the match for Sarajevo
19 September 1969	(Socialist Federal Republic of Yugoslavia) FK Željezničar	1–1	(Brazil) Santos FC	Santos' Yugoslav Tour	— Željo: Radović, Hrvat, Bećirspahić, Saračević, Hadžiabdić, Bratić, Jelušić, Osim (Deraković), Bukal, Musemić (Janković), and Bajić (Kojović); head coach: Milan Ribar — Santos: Gilmar, Delgado, Turcão, Lima, Clodoaldo, Joel, Manoel Maria, Nené, Edú, Douglas, Pelé, and Abel — scorers: 1:0 Bukal (45th min), 1:1 Pelé (78th min) — attendance: ~30,000 — 22-year-old FK Sarajevo and Yugoslavia national team player Vahidin Musemić played the friendly match for his club's city rival Željo only twelve days after the Sarajevo derby in the Yugoslav First League, a match in which Sarajevo beat Željo 1-2 — the friendly match was Santos' fourth and final outing on their Yugoslav tour, (four friendly matches in nine days); before Željo they played Yugoslav First League sides Red Star (September 10; 3-3), Dinamo Zagreb (September 13th; 1-1), and Radnički Kragujevac (September 16; 4-4) — Željo played the friendly match in-between two of their league fixtures at the start of the 1969–70 Yugoslav First League; five days earlier, they had destroyed NK Olimpija 0-4 away in Ljubljana while only two days after playing Santos, they would host FK Vojvodina and beat them 3-1 — the crowd and media interest that Santos FC and their soon to be twenty-nine-year-old superstar Pelé garnered in Yugoslavia was sizeable; each of their four friendlies in the country was played in front of a packed stadium (~70,000 vs Red Star at Marakana, ~60,000 vs Dinamo at Maksimir, ~8,000 vs Radnički Kragujevac at Čika Dača, and ~30,000 vs Željo at Koševo) with each match broadcast live on Yugoslav television
16 June 1971	(Socialist Federal Republic of Yugoslavia) FK Željezničar	3–3	(Italy) Inter Milan	FK Željezničar 50th Anniversary	— Željo: Janjuš, Kojović, Bećirspahić, Bratić, Katalinski, Hadžiabdić, Jelušić, Janković, Bukal, Sprečo, and Džajić; head coach: Milan Ribar — Inter: Bordon, Bedin, Oriali (46th min Burgnich), Jair, Bertini, Boninsegna, Mazzola, Frustalupi, Fabbian (46th min Cella), Giubertoni, and Corso; head coach: Giovanni Invernizzi — scorers: 0:1 Boninsegna (4th min), 1:1 Janković (15th min), 2:1 Džajić (45th min), 2:2 Boninsegna (63rd min), 2:3 Mazzola (67th min), 3:3 Bukal (70th min) — attendance: ~50,000 — 25-year-old Red Star Belgrade and Yugoslavia national team star player Dragan Džajić played the friendly match for Željezničar — several weeks before the friendly match, Inter Milan had finished their league season, winning their eleventh Serie A league title — Željo played the friendly match in-between their league fixtures from the end of the 1970–71 Yugoslav First League season; three days earlier they had beaten NK Maribor 5-0 at home and with two weeks (two matches) left in the league, Željo—trailing league leaders Hajduk Split by 3 points—still had a slight outside chance of winning the title — four days after the friendly match with Inter, Željo travelled away to Crvenka to face relegation battlers FK Crvenka and only got a 2-2 draw while Hajduk, despite trailing 3-0 at halftime, managed to score four goals within 38 minutes and defeat FK Partizan away 3-4 thus clinching the title
17 August 1972	(Socialist Federal Republic of Yugoslavia) FK Sarajevo	2–2	(Spain) Real Madrid C.F.	FK Sarajevo 25th Anniversary	— Sarajevo: Muftić (Gruda), Tešan, Muzurović (Kuduz), Šljivo, Lubura (Demir), Rašević, D. Simić (R. Simić), Pirić, Musemić, Cerić (Frančević), and Petković; head coach: Srboljub Markušević — Real: García Remón, Touriño (José Luis 45´), Benito, Verdugo, Pirri (Andrés 45´), Zoco, Amancio, Grosso, Santillana, Velázquez, and Aguilar; head coach: Miguel Muñoz — scorers: 0:1 Aguilera (31st min), 0:2 Pirri (36th min), 1:2 Rašević (41st min, penalty kick), 2:2 Pirić (80th min) — reigning La Liga champions Real played the friendly match as part of their pre-season training for the upcoming La Liga season set to start two weeks later — Sarajevo played the friendly match as final preparation ahead of travelling to Bor three days later for the opening of their 1972–73 Yugoslav First League campaign away at newly-promoted FK Bor where Sarajevo would go on to lose in a 4-1 upset
11 June 1986	(Socialist Federal Republic of Yugoslavia) Estrada Team Sarajevo	3–4	(Socialist Federal Republic of Yugoslavia) Estrada Team Belgrade	Raising funds for the Bentbaša pool renovation	— Estrada Team Sarajevo: Džinović, Rizvanbegović, Popović, Varešanović, Vojičić, Kusturica, Karajlić; head coach: Boško Antić — Estrada Team Belgrade: Šaulić, Topalović, Mijatović; head coach: Dragan Džajić — scorers: Kusturica, Mijatović, Mijatović, Mijatović — attendance: 62,000 — referees: Miodrag Čolić and Salem Prolić — the exhibition match was played at Koševo Stadium midweek in-between two Yugoslav First League scheduled fixture weeks

== Concerts ==
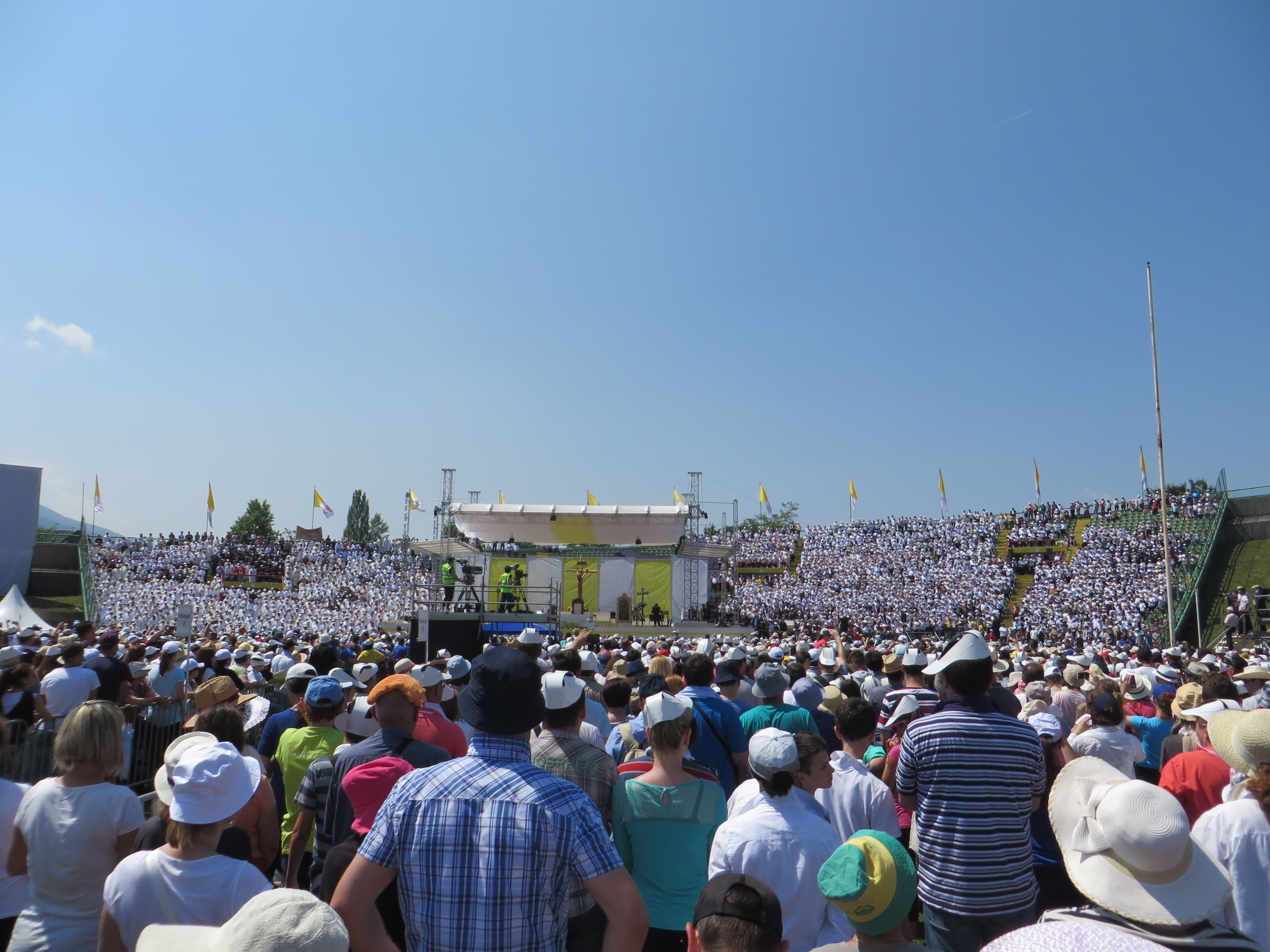
Pope Francis celebrating Mass at the stadium on 6 June 2015

- Zdravko Čolić – 7 September 1978 (Putujući zemljotres Tour, the concert got stopped midway through due to heavy rain)
- U2 – 23 September 1997 (PopMart Tour)
- Dino Merlin – 31 July 2000 (Sredinom Tour, guests: Adi Lukovac & Ornamenti, Ivana Banfić, Amir Bjelanović Tula, Miro Asotić)
- Dino Merlin – 31 July 2004 (Burek Tour, guests: Željko Joksimović, Ivana Banfić, Nina Badrić, Edo Zanki, Almir Hukelić, Gani Tamir)
- Bijelo Dugme – 15 June 2005
- Haris Džinović – 23 June 2007 (guests: Halid Bešlić, Hari Varešanović, Željko Joksimović, Enis Bešlagić)
- Moj ummete 2007 – 28 July 2007
- Dino Merlin – 19 July 2008 (Ispočetka Tour, guests: Hari Varešanović, Vesna Zmijanac, Tony Cetinski, Eldin Huseinbegović, Ivana Banfić, Baby Dooks, Elvedin Krilić)
- Hari Mata Hari – 10 August 2009 (Sreća Tour, guests: Nina Badrić, Dino Merlin, Halid Bešlić, Dražen Žerić Žera, Eldin Huseinbegović)
- Željko Joksimović – 12 June 2010 (guests: Halid Bešlić, Hari Varešanović, Jelena Tomašević)
- Zdravko Čolić – 31 July 2010 (Kad pogledaš me preko ramena Tour, guests: Dino Merlin, Nikša Bratoš)
- Halid Bešlić – 22 June 2013 (Romanija Tour, guests: Haris Džinović, Željko Joksimović, Enes Begović, Dženan Jahić, Viki Miljković, Colonia, Enis Bešlagić)
- Dino Merlin – 25 July 2015 (Hotel Nacional Tour)
- Željko Joksimović – 19 August 2016
- Marija Šerifović – 1 July 2018 (guests: Jelena Karleuša)
- Dino Merlin – 31 July, 1 August and 2 August 2026

== Other events ==
- Pope John Paul II celebrated Mass in the stadium in front of 50,000 people – 13 April 1997
- Pope Francis celebrated Mass in the stadium in front of 67,000 people – 6 June 2015

== See also ==
- List of football stadiums in Bosnia and Herzegovina
