= List of Bosnia and Herzegovina patriotic songs =

Wikipedia list for article(s)

Modern-day flag of Bosnia

This is a list of Bosnian-and-Herzegovinian patriotic songs.

Title	English translation	Lyricist	Composer	Arranger	Year	Description	Reference(s)
"Bosna i Hercegovina"	'Bosnia and Herzegovina'	Nazif Gljiva			1992	song by singer Nazif Gljiva as 10th on his 1992 album Ljiljanima do pobjede	
"Burek"	'Burek'	Edin Dervišhalidović	Edin Dervišhalidović	Srđan Kurpjel	2004	song by singer Dino Merlin about national symbols of Bosnia (name of a dish is album title)	
"Čuvaj babo našu Bosnu"	'Take care[,] Dad[,] of our Bosnia'	I. Mujezin	Rizo Hamidović	M. Sijerčić	1994	song by Bosniak (from Sandžak) singer Rizo Hamidović on his 1994 album Inšallah	
"Bosanska Artiljerija"	'Bosnian Artillery'	Muhamed Brkić Hamo	Faik Bahtijarević	Dragan Divjak	1992	song performed by Muhamed Brkić Hamo, at the start of Bosnian War	
"Grbavica"	—	Mladen Vojičić			1993/1997	song of wartime-period Bosnia	
"Iznad Bosne"	'Above Bosnia'	Fayo	Amir Kazić Leo	Arel Češljar, Meho Radović	2022	song sung by Adnan Jakupović	
"Jedna si jedina"	'You're the One and Only'	Edin Dervišhalidović			1992	former national anthem of Bosnia and Herzegovina	
"Sva bol svijeta"	'All the Pain in the World'	Fahrudin Pecikoza, Edin Dervišhalidović	Edin Dervišhalidović		1993	Bosnian entry in the Eurovision Song Contest 1993, performed in Bosnian by Fazla (the song's title refers to the suffering of the world caused by Bosnian War ongoing at the time)	
"Vojnik sreće"	'A Soldier of Fortune'	Edin Dervišhalidović			1993	song by singer Dino Merlin about Bosnian Wartime	
"Volio BiH"	pun for "I'd Like To", bih meaning 'would like to'	Dubioza kolektiv			2013	song performed by Bosnian band Dubioza kolektiv as 4th on their 2013 album Apsurdistan	
"U.S.A" (Note: Also known as "I am from Bosnia, take me to America")	—	Dubioza kolektiv			2011	Song that is used as an informal fan anthem for Bosnia’s qualification for the 2026 FIFA World Cup in the USA.	
"Šehidski rastanak"	'Martyr's Farewell'	Suad Sukre	Suad Sukre		1994	Wartime patriotic song famously performed by traditional sevdah singer Safet Isović, honoring fallen soldiers.	

== See also ==
- List of Bosnia and Herzegovina folk songs
