= Ispočetka =

Studio album by Dino Merlin
- Released: 9 June 2008
- Recorded: 2004–2008
- Genres: Pop rock Folk pop
- Labels: MP BHRT; Croatia Records; City Records; ShopNovella
- Producer: Dino Merlin (executive)

Dino Merlin chronology
Burek (2004)	Ispočetka (2008)	Hotel Nacional (2014)

Singles from Ispočetka
- 1. "Otkrit ću ti tajnu" Released: 13 August 2007; 2. "Dabogda (feat. Hari Mata Hari)" Released: May 2008; 3. "Da šutiš (Indigo) (feat. Eldin Huseinbegović)" Released: July 2008; 4. "Deset Mlađa" Released: December 2008; 5. "Nedostaješ" Released: July 2009; 6. "Individualizam" Released: 2011

Ispočetka (trans. From the beginning) is the fifth solo studio album by Dino Merlin, released on 9 June 2008 via Croatia Records, MP BHRT, City Records, and ShopNovella. The album was named after its titular song, which was recorded in 2004 and was intended to be the last song on Dino's album Burek. The first single promoting the album, "Otkrit ću ti tajnu", was released in August 2007 as a free download in partnership with BH Telecom. He signed a contract with Croatia Records, MP BHRT and City Records. One of the songs, named "Dabogda", from the album is done with Hari Mata Hari, the famous Bosnian singer. The complete song is written by Dino Merlin. Ispočetka was one of the best selling albums of 2008 in Serbia.

== History ==
The album itself was announced through a promotional single titled "Otkrit ċu ti tajnu" in August 2007. As with his previous works such as Sredinom and Burek the album includes several collaborations with local and regional artists.

In an interview with Maxi Magazin Dino stated that the decision to release the promotional single was made to ease the burden of dealing with over twenty songs he is currently working on and knowing that some of them will never be released. In the same interview he stated that he has enough material for a double CD but that "life is too short for double CD's."

The song "Otkrit ċu ti tajnu" can be downloaded by visiting the BH Telecom Web site. The second single, titled "Dabogda" was released 29 May 2008 to all regional radio and TV stations.

Dino's official site also announced a concert date to coincide with the promotion of Ispočetka.

== Track listing ==
No.	Title	Writer(s)	Producer(s)	Length
1.	"Ispočetka"	Dino Merlin	Dino Merlin, Mahir Sarihodžić, Mahir Beathouse, Vlado Džihan
2.	"Dabogda"	Dino Merlin	Dino Merlin, David Vurdelja (Baby Dooks)
3.	"Deset mlađa"	Dino Merlin, Mahir Sarihodžić	Dino Merlin, Enes Tvrtković, Nebojša Arežina, Marko Peruničić
4.	"Individualizam"	Dino Merlin	Dino Merlin, Mahir Sarihodžić, Mahir Beathouse
5.	"Nedostaješ"	Dino Merlin	Dino Merlin, Srđan Kurpjel
6.	"Da šutiš"	Dino Merlin	Dino Merlin, Mahir Sarihodžić, Mahir Beathouse
7.	"Klupko"	Dino Merlin	Dino Merlin, Srđan Kurpjel, Mahir Sarihodžić, Mahir Beathouse
8.	"Ptica bijela"	Dino Merlin	Dino Merlin, Đani Pervan, Dino Šukalo
9.	"Hadžija"	Dino Merlin	Dino Merlin, Mahir Sarihodžić, Mahir Beathouse
10.	"Drama"	Dino Merlin	Dino Merlin, Nikša Bratoš
11.	"Da šutiš (Indigo)"	Dino Merlin	Dino Merlin, Enes Tvrtković, Eldin Huseinbegović
12.	"Otkrit ću ti tajnu"	Dino Merlin	Dino Merlin, Dino Šukalo
13.	"Grudobolja"	Dino Merlin	Dino Merlin, Dino Šukalo

== Singles ==
- "Otkrit Ću Ti Tajnu" was the first promo single, and was released in August 2007.
- "Dabogda"(feat. Hari Varešanović) was released a few days before the album release. The video has been shot on Baščaršija in Sarajevo. The director was Pjer Žalica.
- "Da Šutiš" was released in July 2008. The video was directed by Radislav Jovanov Gonzo and produced by DIM BiH/Hr.
- "Deset Mlađa" was released in December 2008. The video was premiered at a concert in Switzerland. The main role in the video is played by Giusy lo Brutto, an Italian actress. The video is shot in Switzerland and filmed in black and white. It was directed by Haris Dubica.
- "Ispočetka" was the fifth single. The video premiere was 15 May 2009.
- "Nedostaješ" is the sixth video from the album. It was shot in Sarajevo in June 2009, after Dino returned from Montenegro, where he held a concert in Podgorica and shot a video in Budva for his duet with Emina Jahović for the song "Med" from her album Vila.
- "Individualizam" was the seventh video from the album. The video was shot over a period of two years, in New York, Tokyo, Luzern, Paris, Lyon, Madrid, Lisbon and Sanski Most. The video included five hundred people. The video was directed by Haris Dubica.

== Tour ==
The tour for promoting the album started on Koševo. A few concerts were held after that. Then Dino has been on vacation. The tour was continued in autumn. Merlin said that he will make a concert in Belgrade. The Europe tour was continued in March. He toured in USA in April and in Australia in May 2009. Dino was invited to opet the new arena in Zenica with a concert. But all 9000 tickets were sold out, so he decided to make another concert on Saturday, 21 March. So over 15,000 people were on the concerts. It was the first time in Bosnia and Herzegovina that an artist played two concerts in two days in the same arena. The tickets were available for 10 KM($7), but they were sold illegally for 35 KM($24). That was also unusual in Bosnia. After more than 20 years Dino decided to visit Serbia and to make a concert in Belgrade. On Monday, 10 October, the first day of the tickets sale for the concert in the Belgrade Arena a record has been broken: 2500 tickets were sold in the first four hours. The concert was sold out in four days. Another show has been added on 26 November. After the second show was sold out another one was added. All three shows were sold out, 60,000 people attended.

=== Koševo 2008 ===
A concert at Koševo Stadium was held on 19 July 2008. It was a big event, one of the biggest in Bosnia in the past few years. Special guest of the concert were Hari Varešanović for the song "Dabogda", Tony Cetinski for the song "Drama", Eldin Huseinbegović for the song "Da šutiš (Indigo)" and Vesna Zmijanac for "Klupko" and one of his biggest hits "Kad zamirišu jorgovani". 65,000 people came to the concert. Dino sang for 3 hours. The concert begun with "Otkrit ću ti tajnu", and ended with the duet "Kad zamirišu jorgovani".

=== Tour dates ===
Date	City	Country	Venue	Notes
Europe
19 July 2008	Sarajevo	Bosnia and Herzegovina	Stadion Koševo	65,000 people attended the concert. Guests Vesna Zmijanac, Tony Cetinski, Eldin Huseinbegović, Hari Varešanović
6 August 2008	Budva	Montenegro	Jaz Beach	10,000 people attended. Guest Vesna Zmijanac
8 August 2008	Bihać	Bosnia and Herzegovina	Stadion Jedinstva	15,000 people attended. Guests Vesna Zmijanac, Eldin Huseinbegović, Hari Verašanović
16 August 2008	Tuzla	Bosnia and Herzegovina	Stadion Tušanj	20,000 people attended. Guests Vesna Zmijanac, Eldin Huseinbegović, Hari Verašanović
3 October 2008	Bielefeld	Germany	Event Center	
4 October 2008	Munich	Germany	Kulturhalle	
24 October 2008	Hamburg	Germany	Studenten Halle	
25 October 2008	Frankfurt	Germany	Union Halle	
1 November 2008	Erkrath	Germany	Stadthalle	
15 November 2008	Ljubljana	Slovenia	Gospodarsko Razstavisce	
20 November 2008	Skopje	Macedonia	Dvorana Boris Trajkovski	
22 November 2008	Vienna	Austria	Planet Discothèque	
5 December 2008	Paris	France	Espace Venise	
12 December 2008	Burghausen	Germany	Gastro und Musik	
13 December 2008	Zürich	Switzerland	Stadthalle Dietikon	Video premiere of Deset Mlađa
24 December 2008	Düsseldorf	Germany	Consum-Club	
25 December 2008	Berlin	Germany	Universal Hall	
28 December 2008	Montagny	Switzerland	Zed Club	
28 February 2009	Dommeldange	Luxembourg	Salle des sports	
7 March 2009	Vienna	Austria	Bank Austria Halle	
20 March 2009	Zenica	Bosnia and Herzegovina	Arena	15,000 people attended.
21 March 2009	Zenica	Bosnia and Herzegovina	Arena	
4 April 2009	Norrköping	Sweden	Folkets Park Borgen	
10 April 2009	Gothenburg	Sweden	Hogsbohallen Angasvallen-Frolunda	
11 April 2009	Malmö	Sweden	Baltiska Hallen	
12 April 2009	Horsens	Denmark	Torsted Hallen	
North America
17 April 2009	Detroit	USA	Royalty House	
19 April 2009	Toronto	Canada	Kool House	
19 April 2009	New York City	USA	East Manor	
24 April 2009	Chicago	USA	Hanging Gardens	
25 April 2009	Waterloo	USA	Millenium Hall	
26 April 2009	St. Louis, Missouri	USA	Orlando Gardens South	
Europe
9 May 2009	Stuttgart	Germany	Club Hot Spot	
Australia
22 May 2009	Sydney	Australia	Whitlam Centre	
23 May 2009	Melbourne	Australia	Melbourne Sports and Aquatic Centre	
25 May 2009	Perth	Australia	Herb Graham Recreation Centre	
Europe
6 June 2009	Wels	Austria	Messeggelande Halle 6	3,000 people attended.
13 June 2009	Podgorica	Montenegro	Stadion malih sportova	12,000 people attended. Guests Vesna Zmijanac, Eldin Huseinbegović
21 July 2009	Bugojno	Bosnia and Herzegovina	Gradska sala	
23 July 2009	Bosanska Krupa	Bosnia and Herzegovina	Gradski stadion	
25 July 2009	Tešanj	Bosnia and Herzegovina	Gradski stadion	10,000 people attended
27 July 2009	Sanski Most	Bosnia and Herzegovina	Gradski stadion	10,000 people attended
1 August 2009	Ohrid	Macedonia	Biljanini stadion	
19 August 2009	Dubrovnik	Croatia	Gospino Polje	
21 August 2009	Pula	Croatia	Pula Arena	
3 October 2009	Munich	Germany	Tonhalle	
10 October 2009	Erkrath	Germany	Stadthalle Erkrath	
17 October 2009	Frankfurt	Germany	Union Hall	
25 October 2009	Osijek	Croatia	Dvorana 'Gradsko polje'	6000 people attended
~~14 November 2009~~	~~Ljubuški~~	Bosnia and Herzegovina	~~Sportska Dvorana~~	Canceled due death threat to Dino Merlin. Official because of a soccer game between Bosnia and Herzegovina and Portugal
21 November 2009	Wien	Austria	Bank Austria Halle	
4 December 2009	Celje	Slovenia	Dvorana Golovec	
5 December 2009	Kranj	Slovenia	Ledena Dvorana	
12 December 2009	Zürich	Switzerland	Stadthalle Dietikon	
19 December 2009	Pforzheim	Germany	Club Flash	
6 February 2010	Sarajevo	Bosnia and Herzegovina	Zetra	
13 February 2010	Varaždin	Croatia	Arena Varaždin	
18 February 2010	Split	Croatia	Spaladium Arena	9000 people attended. Guests Edo Zanki and Ivana Banfić
30 April 2010	Bielefeld	Germany	Diskoteka Prime	
1 May 2010	Hamburg	Germany	Balkan Night	
7 May 2010	Oslo	Norway	Furuset Forum	
8 May 2010	Stockholm	Sweden	Gamla Tryckeriet-Bromma	
12 June 2010	Wels	Austria	Messegelende Hall 6	
18 September 2010	Skopje	Macedonia	Metropolis Arena	12,000 people attended
6 November 2010	Frankfurt	Germany	Unionhalle	2000 people attended
27 November 2010	Düsseldorf	Germany		
11 December 2010	Zürich	Switzerland	Stadhalle	
18 December 2010	Dommeldange	Luxembourg	Hall Omnisports	
5 March 2011	Stuttgart	Germany	Messe Sindelfingen	
12 March 2011	Montlingen	Switzerland	Disco Flash	
21 April 2011	Horsens	Denmark	Torsted Hallen	
22 April 2011	Gothenburg	Sweden	Hosbo Hallen	
23 April 2011	Norrköping	Sweden	Borgen	
24 April 2011	Helsingborg	Sweden	Sundsparlan	
11 June 2011	Ljubljana	Slovenia	Križanke	
18 June 2011	Vienna	Austria	Bank Austria Halle Gasometer	5000 people attended.
9 July 2011	Opatija	Croatia	Ljetna Pozornica	
25 November 2011	Belgrade	Serbia	Belgrade Arena	Sold out in four days. 20,000 people attended.
26 November 2011	Belgrade	Serbia	Belgrade Arena	20,000 people attended.
27 November 2011	Belgrade	Serbia	Belgrade Arena	20,000 people attended.
22 December 2011	Zagreb	Croatia	Arena	
