= Merlin (Yugoslav band) =

Yugoslav pop rock band

Background information
- Origin: Sarajevo, SR Bosnia and Herzegovina, SFR Yugoslavia
- Genres: Pop rock; folk rock
- Years active: 1983–1991
- Labels: Diskoton, Nimfa Sound
- Past members: Edin Dervišhalidović; Amir Bjelanović; Mili Milišić; Džafer Saračević; Mensur Lutkica

Merlin was a Yugoslav pop rock band formed in Sarajevo in 1985.

Formed by vocalist and songwriter Edin "Dino" Dervišhalidović, Merlin achieved popularity with their 1985 debut album Kokuzna vremena and their Bijelo Dugme-influenced sound. With their second studio album Teško meni sa tobom (a još teže bez tebe), released in 1986, the band established themselves as representatives of the Sarajevo-based New Partisans movement. The group released three more studio album featuring folk-influenced pop rock sound, scoring several hit songs. Merlin disbanded with the outbreak of Bosnian War, and Dervišhalidović started his career as a highly successful solo artist under the stage name Dino Merlin.

== History ==
=== 1983–1991 ===
At the beginning of 1980s, Edin Dervišhalidović was an aspiring young musician working in Uljanik factory. In 1985, he formed the band Merlin. The original lineup of the band featured Amir "Tula" Bjelanović (guitar), Mili Milišić (bass guitar), Džafer Saračević (drums) and Mensur Lutkica (keyboards). During the following years, Merlin would see numerous lineup changes, with Dervišhalidović and Bjelanović remaining the mainstay members of the band.

In 1985, Merlin released their debut album Kokuzna vremena (Broke Times). The album was produced by Brano Likić, who would also work with the band on their future releases. Yugoslav music critics generally disliked the album, describing Merlin as a pale copy of Bijelo Dugme. However, owing to Bijelo Dugme-influenced songs like "U kandžama jastreba" ("In the Claws of a Goshawk"), "Jutro u Split" ("Morning in Split") and "Ljubav nije paradajz" ("Love Is Not a Tomato"), the album sold 60,000 copies, much to the surprise of the Yugoslav music press.

In 1986, the band released the album Teško meni sa tobom (a još teže bez tebe) (It's Hard With You (Even Harder Without You)). With the album, the band joined on the New Partisans movement, characterized by lyrics and imagery heavily inspired by Yugoslav Partisans and the ideals of Yugoslavism. The album featured guest appearance by Bijelo Dugme leader Goran Bregović and vocalist Mladen Vojičić "Tifa". The album's front cover featured a stylized photograph of Marilyn Monroe and the inscription Teško meni sa tobom..., and the back cover featured a stylized photograph of World War II fighter Milja Marin, made during the winter 1943-44 by photographer Žorž Skrigin, and the inscription ...a još teže bez tebe. The record brought the brotherhood and unity-themed song "Cijela Juga jedna avlija" ("Whole Yugoslavia Is One Yard") and ballad "Uspavanka za Gorana B." ("Lullaby for Goran B."), in reference to Bijelo Dugme leader Goran Bregović and Bijelo Dugme's album Uspavanka za Radmilu M. (Lullaby for Radmila M.). The song "Nek padaju ćuskije" ("May Handspikes Fall") became a large hit for the band, with growing popularity bringing them increased attention of the media.

In 1987, the band released their third album, entitled simply Merlin. Abandoning the New Partisans concept, the band recorded commercially less successful album, with the songs "Lelo" ("(Oh) Lela"), "Božić je" ("It's Christmas") and "Niko kao ja" ("No One Like Me") becoming only minor hits. The song "Kad ti dođem nesrećo" ("When I Come to You, Misfortune") featured a quotation from the old hit "Šta će mi život" ("What Do I Need Life For") by folk singer Silvana Armenulić. At the time, Dervišhalidović wrote a number of successful songs for folk singer Vesna Zmijanac, including the duet "Kad zamirišu jorgovani" ("When the Smell of Lilacs Is in the Air") recorded by the two.

With their following studio album, the 1989 Nešto lijepo treba da se desi (Something Nice Is About to Happen), the band continued to follow trends on the Yugoslav pop scene, turning more to folk-oriented sound. The song "Mjesečina", which became a major hit, was a cover of UB40 1988 song "Where Did I Go Wrong", although UB40 were not credited on Nešto lijepo treba da se desi. The album also included a new version of "Kad zamirišu jorgovani". Folk-oriented tracks "Bosnom behar probeharao" ("The Smell of Flowers Spread Over Bosnia") and "Je l' Sarajevo gdje je nekad bilo" ("Is Sarajevo Where It Used to Be") became large hits and provided Dervišhalidović with offers to write songs for popular Yugoslav acts like Lepa Brena, Zdravko Čolić, Hari Varešanović, and others.

In 1990, the group released their last studio album, entitled Peta strana svijeta (Fifth Side of the World). The album brought the successful songs "Harmonika" ("Accordion"), "Sa mojih usana" ("From My Lips") and "Šta ti značim ja" ("What I Mean to You"). Just before the outbreak of Yugoslav Wars in 1991, the band released the compilation album Hitovi (Hits), and made a cameo appearance in Ratko Ozrović's comedy film Bračna putovanja (Marital Trips), with songs from their studio albums used as the film's soundtrack. In the summer of 1991, Dervišhalidović appeared on the Yutel for Peace concert, performing a cover of Queen song "We Will Rock You" entitled "Ljubav nema granica" ("Love Knows No Borders"). With the outbreak of Bosnian War, Merlin ended their activity.

=== Post breakup ===
During the Bosnian War, Dervišhalidović recorded several patriotic songs, including "Jedna si jedina" ("You're the One and Only"), which was until 1998 used as the anthem of Bosnia and Herzegovina. He represented Bosnia and Herzegovina at the 1993 Eurovision Song Contest with the song "Sva bol svijeta" ("All the Pain of the World"). In 1994, he released the compilation of Merlin's ballads entitled Balade 1984 - 1994, dedicating it to the band's bass guitarist Aleksandar Aćimović, keyboardist Mustafa Nurak and manager Kemal Bisić, all of whom lost their lives in the war. In 1993, he released his first solo album Moja bogda sna, starting a career of one of the most popular and commercially successful pop singers in the former Yugoslav region.

After the disbandment of Merlin, Bjelanović continued his career a studio musician, cooperating with a number of acts, most prominently singers Mladen Vojičić "Tifa" and Zlatan Fazlić. In 1999, he released his solo album Pancirna duša (Bulletproof Soul), featuring instrumentals composed by himself and Damir Arslanagić and recorded during Bosnian War. The album included an instrumental cover of the old sevdalinka "Mehmeda majka budila" ("Mehmed Was Awaken by His Mother"). Bjelanović died on 11 September 2019.

== Discography ==
=== Studio albums ===
- Kokuzna vremena (1985)
- Teško meni sa tobom (a još teže bez tebe) (1986)
- Merlin (1987)
- Nešto lijepo treba da se desi (1989)
- Peta strana svijeta (1990)

=== Compilation albums ===
- Hitovi (1991)
- Najljepše pjesme 1984 - 1994 (1994)
- Balade 1984 - 1994 (1994)
- The Rest of the Best 1984 - 1997 (1997)

== See also ==
- New Partisans
