= Vječna vatra =

Vječna vatra in Bosnian means eternal flame and may refer to:

- Eternal flame (Sarajevo) (Vječna vatra), memorial in Sarajevo
- Live: Vječna vatra, music album by Dino Merlin
