= Teško meni sa tobom (a još teže bez tebe) =

Studio album by Merlin
- Released: November 3, 1986
- Recorded: 1986
- Genre: Pop-rock; Folk-rock
- Label: Diskoton
- Producer: Brano Likić

Merlin chronology
Kokuzna vremena (1985)	Teško meni sa tobom (a još teže bez tebe) (1986)	Merlin (1987)

Teško meni sa tobom (a još teže bez tebe) (transl. I Have It Hard With You (And Even Harder Without You) is the second studio album released by the former Yugoslavia's band Merlin in 1986.

The album cover features a stylized version of Žorž Skrigin's iconic World War II photograph Kozarčanka (1943–44), depicting the young Yugoslav Partisan nurse Milja Marin.

== Track listing ==
All tracks are written by Dino Merlin, and produced by Dino Merlin and Brano Likić.

No.	Title	Length
1.	"Dođi il' me se prođi"
2.	"Teško meni sa tobom (a još teže bez tebe)"
3.	"Cijela Juga jedna avlija"
4.	"Ne budi me Seno"
5.	"Sibirska"
6.	"Nek' padaju ćuskije"
7.	"Mama, neću da sam živ"
8.	"Uspavanka za Gorana B."
9.	"E, otkad mi se nisi javila"
10.	"Lažu me"

== Personnel ==
- Artwork by Trio
- Executive producer – Vetko Šalaka
- Performers (Band members) – Edin Dervišhalidović, Džaf Saračević, Mensur Lutvica, Enver "Mili" Milišić, Tula Bjelanović
- Performers (Special guests) – Damir Arslanagić, Goran Bregović, Igor Ivanović, Mladen "Tifa" Vojičić, Saša Strunjaš, Zlatan Čeha
- Producer – Likić B.
- Producer, recorded by Neno Jeleč
