= Bećirspahić =

Bećirspahić is a surname, derived from the name Bećir and the Turkish term sipahi. Notable people with the surname include:

- Mersada Bećirspahić (born 1957), Bosnia and Herzegovina basketball player
- Velija Bećirspahić (born 1943), Bosnia and Herzegovina footballer and coach
