= Kokuzna vremena =

Studio album by Merlin
- Released: August 16, 1985
- Recorded: 1983–1985
- Genre: Pop-rock; folk-rock
- Label: Diskoton
- Producer: Brano Likić

Merlin chronology
Kokuzna vremena (1985)	Teško meni sa tobom (a još teže bez tebe) (1986)

Kokuzna vremena (transl. Broke Times) is the debut studio album by the former Yugoslavia's band Merlin, released in 1985.

== Track listing ==
All tracks are written by Dino Merlin, and produced by Dino Merlin and Brano Likić.

No.	Title	Length
1.	"Kokuzna vremena"
2.	"Ljubav nije paradajz"
3.	"Jutro u Splitu"
4.	"Pile u kandžama jastreba"
5.	"Svjetla Zagreba"
6.	"Pričalica"
7.	"Ružan san"
8.	"Duhovi konjaka"
9.	"Daj, nazovi me"

== Personnel ==
- Performers (band members) — Edin Dervišhalidović, Džaf Saračević, Mensur Lutvica, Enver "Mili" Milišić, Tula Bjelanović
- Photography and artwork — Z. Cico
- Producer and engineer — Brano Likić
