= Peta strana svijeta =

Studio album by Merlin
- Released: November 2, 1990
- Recorded: September 1990
- Genre: Pop-rock; Folk-rock

Merlin chronology
Nešto lijepo treba da se desi (1989)	Peta strana svijeta (1990)

Peta strana svijeta (transl. The Fifth Side of the World) is the fifth and final studio album by the former Yugoslavia's band Merlin, released in 1990. Their lead vocalist Dino Merlin released his debut solo album Moja bogda sna in 1993.

== Track listing ==
All tracks are written by Dino Merlin—except for "Harmonika" and "Palidrvce", which are written by Dino Merlin and Fahrudin Pecikoza—and produced by Dino Merlin.

No.	Title	Length
1.	"Harmonika"
2.	"Šta ti značim ja"
3.	"Palidrvce"
4.	"I ovo prođe"
5.	"Pala magla"
6.	"Učini mi pravu stvar"
7.	"Sa mojih usana"
8.	"Ja sam na te navik'o"
9.	"Pogledaj sa prozora"
