= Merlin (Merlin album) =

Studio album by Merlin
- Released: November 1987
- Recorded: 1987
- Studio: Blap
- Genre: Pop-rock; Folk-rock
- Producer: Brano Likić

Merlin chronology
Teško meni sa tobom (a još teže bez tebe) (1986)	Merlin (1987)	Nešto lijepo treba da se desi (1989)

Merlin is the third studio album released by the former Yugoslavia's band of the same name in 1987.

== Track listing ==
All tracks are written by Dino Merlin—except for "Kad ti dođem, nesrećo", which was written by Tomislav Zdravković and Dino Merlin—and produced by Dino Merlin and Brano Likić.

No.	Title	Length
1.	"Sretna nova"
2.	"Tebi je lako"
3.	"Na te mislim dušo"
4.	"Niko kao ja (tvoj veseli Bosanac)"
5.	"Kad ti dođem, nesrećo"
6.	"Samo sam ti ja isti ost'o"
7.	"Božić je"
8.	"Bez obzira na sve"
9.	"Lelo"
10.	"Dobro veče, tugo"
