= Nešto lijepo treba da se desi =

1989 studio album by Merlin

Studio album by Merlin
- Released: March 21, 1989
- Recorded: 1988–1989
- Genre: Pop-rock; Folk-rock
- Length: 32:50

Merlin chronology
Merlin (1987)	Nešto lijepo treba da se desi (1989)	Peta strana svijeta (1990)

Nešto lijepo treba da se desi (transl. Something Nice Needs to Happen) is the fourth studio album released by the former Yugoslavia's band Merlin in 1989. The greatest hit off the album was "Bosnom behar probeharao"; another hit was "Kad zamirišu jorgovani", which was originally performed as a duet by Vesna Zmijanac and Merlin's vocalist Dino Merlin. The album received Golden Bird award for reportedly sold over 300,000 copies.

== Track listing ==
All tracks are written by Dino Merlin—except where noted—and produced by Dino Merlin.

No.	Title	Writer(s)	Length
1.	"Mjesečina"	Jim Brown; Robin Campbell; Earl Falconer; Norman Hassan; Brian Travers; Ali Campbell; Michael Virtue; Terrence Wilson; Goran Mačužić; D. Merlin	3:09
2.	"Bosnom behar probeharao"		4:29
3.	"Zar je to sve što imam od tebe"		3:59
4.	"Ne plači mati"		4:49
5.	"Nešto lijepo treba da se desi"		3:06
6.	"Kad zamirišu jorgovani"		4:54
7.	"Danas sam OK"		3:46
8.	"Je l' Sarajevo gdje je nekad bilo"		4:35

== Covered song and samples ==
- "Mjesečina" contains samples from and is inspired by "Where Did I Go Wrong", as written and performed by UB40.
- "Kad zamirišu jorgovani" is a cover of the 1988 song of the same name, as written by Dino Merlin, and performed by Vesna Zmijanac and Dino Merlin.
