= Fotografija =

Studio album by Dino Merlin
- Released: 16 July 1995
- Genre: Pop rock Folk rock R&B
- Label: In Takt Records
- Producer: Dino Merlin, Ante Toni Lasan

Dino Merlin chronology
Moja bogda sna (1993)	Fotografija (1995)	Live: Vječna vatra (1999)

Fotografija (trans. Photography) is the second solo studio album by Bosnian singer Dino Merlin. It was released on 16 July 1995, through In Takt Records.

Fotografija mainly focuses on topics around Bosnian culture, as the album was being recorded in the midst of the Bosnian War. The song "Kad sve ovo bude jučer" is a cover of Michael Jackson's "They Don't Care About Us", released about a month after Jackson's album HIStory: Past, Present and Future, Book I, and about 9 months before Jackson's version was released as a single.

== Track listing ==
No.	Title	Writer(s)	Producer(s)	Length
1.	"Fotografija"	Dino Merlin	Dino Merlin
2.	"Ja potpuno trijezan umirem"	Džemaludin Latić	Dino Merlin
3.	"De facto Fato"	Dino Merlin	Dino Merlin
4.	"Ne zovi me na grijeh"	Džemaludin Latić	Dino Merlin
5.	"Nemam ja onih osamnaest godina"	Dino Merlin	Dino Merlin, Ante Toni Lasan
6.	"Kad sve ovo bude jučer"	Michael Jackson, Dino Merlin	Dino Merlin
7.	"Merjema"	Dino Merlin	Dino Merlin
8.	"Nedaj me nikome"	Marius Muller-Westernhagen, Dino Merlin	Dino Merlin
9.	"Paša moj solidni"	Luca Carboni, Dino Merlin	Dino Merlin
10.	"Moja pjesma"	Dino Merlin	Dino Merlin
