= Mi (Dino Merlin album) =

Studio album by Dino Merlin
- Released: 2 April 2025
- Recorded: 2020–2025
- Length: 72:51

Dino Merlin chronology
Hotel Nacional (2014)	Mi (2025)

Singles from Mi
- 1. "Mi" Released: 29 October 2020; 2. "Dođi" Released: 31 December 2020; 3. "Jedan dan, jedna noć" Released: 28 May 2021; 4. "Krive karte" Released: 31 March 2022; 5. "Kako da ti kažem" Released: 31 March 2022; 6. "Skoro će zima" Released: 17 November 2023; 7. "Ne radujemo se" Released: 17 November 2023; 8. "Briga" Released: 28 February 2025

Mi (English: We) is the seventh solo studio album by Bosnian singer-songwriter Dino Merlin. It was released on 2 April 2025 by his independent label Magaza in cooperation with Croatia Records as the follow-up to his previous album Hotel Nacional, which was released nearly eleven years prior, on 20 June 2014.

The first single, "Mi", debuted at number seven on the Croatian HR Top 40 in November 2020. The follow-up, "Dođi", peaked at number 22 in January 2021, while the third single, "Jedan dan, jedna noć", also reached number 22 in June 2021. The fourth single, "Krive karte", peaked at number 36 on the HR Top 40, and marked Dino Merlin’s first appearance on Billboard’s Croatia Songs chart, where it reached number ten. "Kako da ti kažem" charted at number 40 in April 2022, and "Skoro će zima" peaked at number 24 in November 2023. In March 2025, "Briga" matched the success of the debut single, reaching number seven. "Ne radujemo se" remains the only single from the album that did not chart.

== Track listing ==
All tracks are written by Dino Merlin.

Mi track listing
No.	Title	Length
1.	"Prvi"	4:50
2.	"Briga"	3:36
3.	"Rudar"	4:22
4.	"Zbog tebe, femme fatale"	3:42
5.	"Neka bude Đula"	4:46
6.	"Muškarci"	4:31
7.	"Mogla si biti..."	4:09
8.	"Sito"	4:15
9.	"Godino vrela" (featuring Halid Bešlić)	3:59
10.	"Zauvijek ovako"	3:55
11.	"Mi"	3:53
12.	"Dođi" (featuring Senidah)	4:53
13.	"Krive karte"	4:37
14.	"Skoro će zima"	4:25
15.	"Jedan dan, jedna noć"	5:02
16.	"Kako da ti kažem"	3:41
17.	"Ne radujemo se" (featuring Marko Louis)	4:31
18.	"Prvi" (acoustic)	4:44
Total length:		72:51

== Charts ==
Chart performance for Mi
Chart (2025)	Peak position
Austrian Albums (Ö3 Austria)	60
Croatian Domestic Albums (HDU)	1
