= Kozarčanka =

World War II photograph

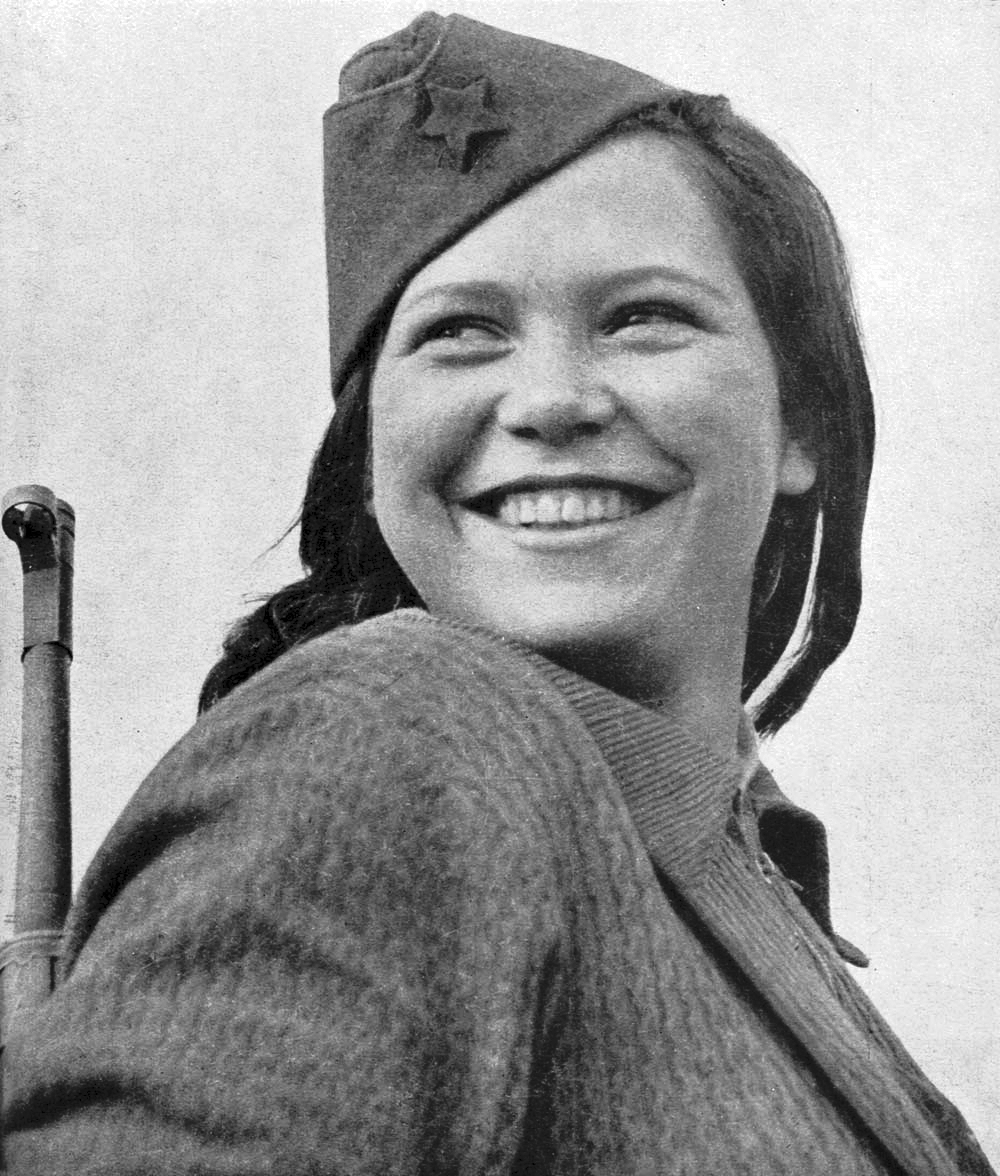
Kozarčanka by Georgij "Žorž" Skrigin. The subject of the photo is Milja Marin (née Toroman).

Kozarčanka (Serbo-Croatian Cyrillic: Козарчанка, lit. 'Woman from Kozara') is a World War II photograph that became iconic in the Socialist Federal Republic of Yugoslavia. Shot by Yugoslav artistic photographer Georgij "Žorž" Skrigin in northern Bosnia during the winter of 1943–44, it shows a smiling female Partisan wearing a Titovka cap and with an MP-40 slung over her shoulder.

The subject of the portrait was Milja Marin, (Note: née Toroman; Serbian Cyrillic: Миља Марин, née Тороман) a Bosnian Serb from a village at the foot of Mount Kozara. Kozarčanka was featured in widely circulated school textbooks, war monographs and posters, as well as on the cover of Merlin's 1986 album Teško meni sa tobom (a još teže bez tebe). Milja's identity as the subject of the photograph was not widely known in Socialist Yugoslavia.

== Background ==
In April 1941, the Kingdom of Yugoslavia was invaded, occupied and dismembered by the Axis powers, led by Nazi Germany. A fascist puppet state known as the Independent State of Croatia (Nezavisna država Hrvatska or NDH) was proclaimed on 10 April, and included almost all of modern-day Croatia, all of modern-day Bosnia-Herzegovina and parts of modern-day Serbia. Led by the Croatian nationalist Ustaše movement, one of the NDH's policies was to eliminate the state's ethnic Serb population with mass killings, expulsions and forced assimilation. Resistance movements were soon created in response to the occupation, one of which was organised by the Communist Party of Yugoslavia. Headed by Josip Broz Tito, the Party decided on 4 July to launch a nationwide armed uprising and the members of the forces under its leadership became known as Partisans; they were also referred to as the National Liberation Army of Yugoslavia. In December 1943 and January 1944, the 11th Krajina Brigade of the National Liberation Army was attacking the Germans and Ustaše in the area of Mount Kozara, in northern Bosnia, to relieve pressure from the Partisans in Banija and eastern Bosnia, where the Axis were conducting major anti-Partisan offensives.

== Photograph and its subject ==
During the winter of 1943–44, the travelling troop of the Theatre of National Liberation encountered a column of Partisans from the 11th Krajina Brigade in the region of Knešpolje, in the Kozara area. The head of the theatre's ballet section was Georgij "Žorž" Skrigin, a Yugoslav ballet dancer of Russian origin. Skrigin was also an internationally acclaimed artistic photographer, and had received prestigious awards at a number of photography exhibitions during the late 1930s. Between 1942 and 1945, Skrigin took around 500 war photographs, some of which would become legendary in Socialist Yugoslavia. The commander of the 11th Krajina Brigade was also present in the column, and Skrigin asked him to photograph a female Partisan fighter. The commander selected five young nurses from the column, among whom Skrigin chose seventeen-year-old Milja Toroman. She was a Bosnian Serb from the village of Brekinja near Dubica, at the foot of Mount Kozara, and had previously been detained by the Ustaše at the Sisak concentration camp. Skrigin put a cardigan on her, slung a captured German MP-40 over her shoulder, tilted her red star-emblazoned Titovka cap to the side of her head, smoothed her hair, and told her to smile. He then photographed her with his Rolleiflex camera.

In his war photographs, Skrigin united two divergent principles: harsh realism, content-wise, and pictorialism, form-wise. In 1968, he published a monograph on his war photography, titled Rat i pozornica (War and Stage), in which the photograph of Milja Toroman is titled Kozarčanka (Woman from Kozara). The caption carries a legend, which does not mention her name: "As a young woman she was captured during the First Enemy Offensive. She succeeded in escaping—even from Germany—and reached Kozara, where she became a fighter of the Kozara forces." Author Natascha Vittorelli describes Kozarčanka as follows:

The young woman wears her shoulder-length hair loose, a thick cardigan, a five-pointed [star on her] side cap—and a rifle. She appears healthy, reposed, and good-humored, her clothes are neat and tidy. The glance over her shoulder reinforces the dynamics of her gesture, the bright smile communicates confidence and optimism, even joy and enthusiasm; the dangers and exertions of war seem remote, the victory near. Quite relaxed she seems to go to a war, which promises adventure and gender equality ... The tension between woman and weapon emphasizes the femininity of the young Partisan, but despite the rifle she rather radiates harmlessness than harassment; her girlishness undermines the provocation the female Partisan implies.

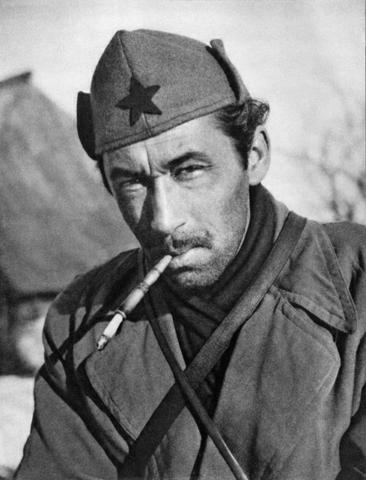
Žorž Skrigin, self-portrait (1943)

Shortly after the war, in 1946, Milja Toroman married Pero Marin, who had fought with the Partisans since the uprising in Kozara in late July 1941. The couple lived in Prijedor, the largest city in the area, and had five children. In an interview she gave in 2007, Milja explained that she did not feel like smiling at the time the photograph was taken because of the war-related hardships that she and her family had endured. Nevertheless, she acquiesced to Skrigin's request and gave a bright smile. Marin also stated that she had never carried a gun before the photograph, nor after. She died on 11 November 2007, at the age of 81.

== Legacy ==
After the war, in which the National Liberation Army was victorious, Kozarčanka became an iconic wartime portrait in Socialist Yugoslavia. It was one of the symbols of the mass participation of women as volunteers in the Partisan struggle, which was thus additionally legitimized as a cause of the whole Yugoslav nation. The official narrative of the Partisan struggle promoted by Yugoslavia's post-war government, led by Tito, served to legitimize the regime and create a common national sentiment in the multi-ethnic country. The female Partisans held a significant place in this narrative. Kozarčanka was featured in widely circulated school textbooks, as well as war monographs and posters. The mass icon glorified the beauty and enthusiasm of a revolutionary. A modified version of Kozarčanka (without the rifle) appeared on the cover of the Yugoslav pop band Merlin's 1986 album Teško meni sa tobom (a još teže bez tebe). The rear of the cover featured a photograph of the actress Marilyn Monroe. For the mythical aura surrounding the heroine represented in Kozarčanka, any exact knowledge about her was unnecessary and could even be damaging. Her identity thus remained mostly unknown to the general public until after the Fall of Communism in Yugoslavia and other European countries, when the photograph's ideological message became irrelevant.

== See also ==
- Marija Bursać, the first female Partisan proclaimed a People's Hero of Yugoslavia
- Marina Ginestà, subject of one of the most iconic photographs of the Spanish Civil War
- Stana Tomašević, another female Partisan subject of well-known photos
- Stjepan Filipović, Partisan whose photograph and exclamation became symbols of anti-fascist resistance

== Sources ==
- Arsenev, Alexei Borisovich (2012). "СКРЫГИН Георгий (Жорж) Владимирович" [Skrygin, Georgy (Zhorzh) Vladimirovich]. Искусство и архитектура Русского зарубежья (in Russian). Dmitry Likhachev Foundation.
- Batinić, Jelena (2015). Women and Yugoslav Partisans: A History of World War II Resistance. Cambridge: Cambridge University Press. ISBN 978-1-107-09107-8.
- Ćurguz, Dragutin; Vignjević, Milorad (1982). Drugi krajiški narodnooslobodilački partizanski (kozarski) odred "Mladen Stojanović" [The 2nd Krajina (Kozara) National Liberation Partisan Detachment "Mladen Stojanović"] (in Serbian). Prijedor: Nacionalni park Kozara.
- Konjikušić, Davor (2021), Red Glow: Yugoslav Partisan Photography and Social Movement, 1941–1945, Berlin, Germany: Walter de Gruyter, ISBN 978-3-42298-648-0
- Kovačević, Dinka (2007). "Mlada partizanka iz čitanke" [The Young Female Partisan from the Reading Book]. Nezavisne novine (in Serbian). Archived from the original on 14 July 2015.
- Lukić, Dragoje (1984). Rat i djeca Kozare [War and Children of Kozara] (in Serbian) (2nd ed.). Belgrade: Narodna knjiga.
- Malić, Goran (8 November 1997). "Одлазак Жоржа Скригина (1910–1997): Мајстор простора и светлости" [Departure of Žorž Skrigin (1910–1997): Master of Space and Light]. Politika (in Serbian). No. 30190. Belgrade: Politika. ISSN 0350-4395.
- Milinović, Đuro; Karasijević, Drago (1982). Jedanaesta krajiška NOU brigada [The 11th Krajina National Liberation Shock Brigade] (in Serbian). Gradiška: Savez udruženja boraca NOR-a opštine.
- "Preminula partizanka sa znamenite fotografije" [The Female Partisan from the Memorable Photograph Passed Away]. Index.hr (in Croatian). 16 November 2007. Archived from the original on 25 May 2014.
- Roberts, Walter R. (1987) [1973]. Tito, Mihailovic and the Allies,1941–1945. Durham, North Carolina: Duke University Press. ISBN 978-0-8223-0773-0.
- Todić, Milanka (2013). Lidija Merenik (ed.). "Socrealistička montaža kao slika vremena" [Montage in Socialist Realism as an Image of the Times]. The Journal of Modern Art History Department (in Serbian). 9. Belgrade: Faculty of Philosophy, University of Belgrade. ISSN 2217-3951.
- Vittorelli, Natascha (2015). "With or Without Gun: Staging Female Partisans in Socialist Yugoslavia". In Miranda Jakiša; Nikica Gilić (eds.). Partisans in Yugoslavia: Literature, Film and Visual Culture. Bielefeld, Germany: transcript Verlag. ISBN 978-3-8394-2522-0.
- Vucinich, Wayne S. (1949). "The Second World War and Beyond". In Robert Joseph Kerner (ed.). Yugoslavia. Berkeley: University of California Press. OCLC 404359.
