= 1996 Solidarity Meeting with Bosnia and Herzegovina =

Athletics competition in Sarajevo

The 1996 Solidarity Meeting with Bosnia and Herzegovina was an athletics competition held on September 9 at the Koševo City Stadium in Sarajevo, Bosnia and Herzegovina.

The event took place on the Koševo City Stadium, which had been renovated following the siege of the city. Originally the venue for the opening and closing ceremonies of the 1984 Winter Olympics, the stadium hosted athletes from 27 countries who participated on a charitable basis. Approximately 50,000 spectators attended the event. The meeting was promoted by Italian Primo Nebiolo, then-president of the International Association of Athletics Federations, and marked the first sporting event in Sarajevo after the end of the war and siege. It aimed to demonstrate the International Association of Athletics Federations' commitment to fostering peace and understanding among nations. The International Association of Athletics Federations and the International Olympic Committee together contributed approximately US$1.5 million to the reconstruction of the city and stadium.

== History ==
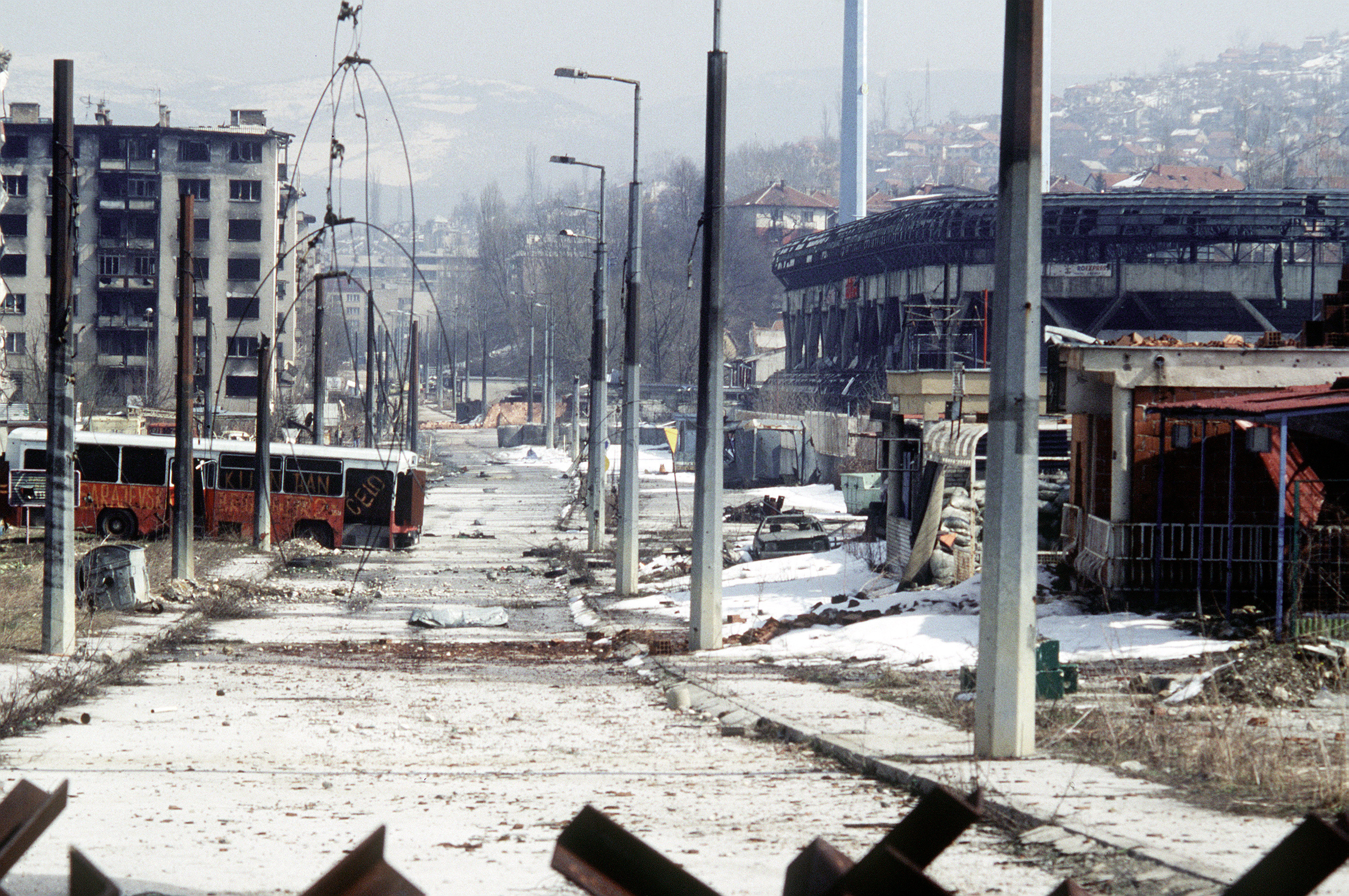
Sarajevo in March 1996

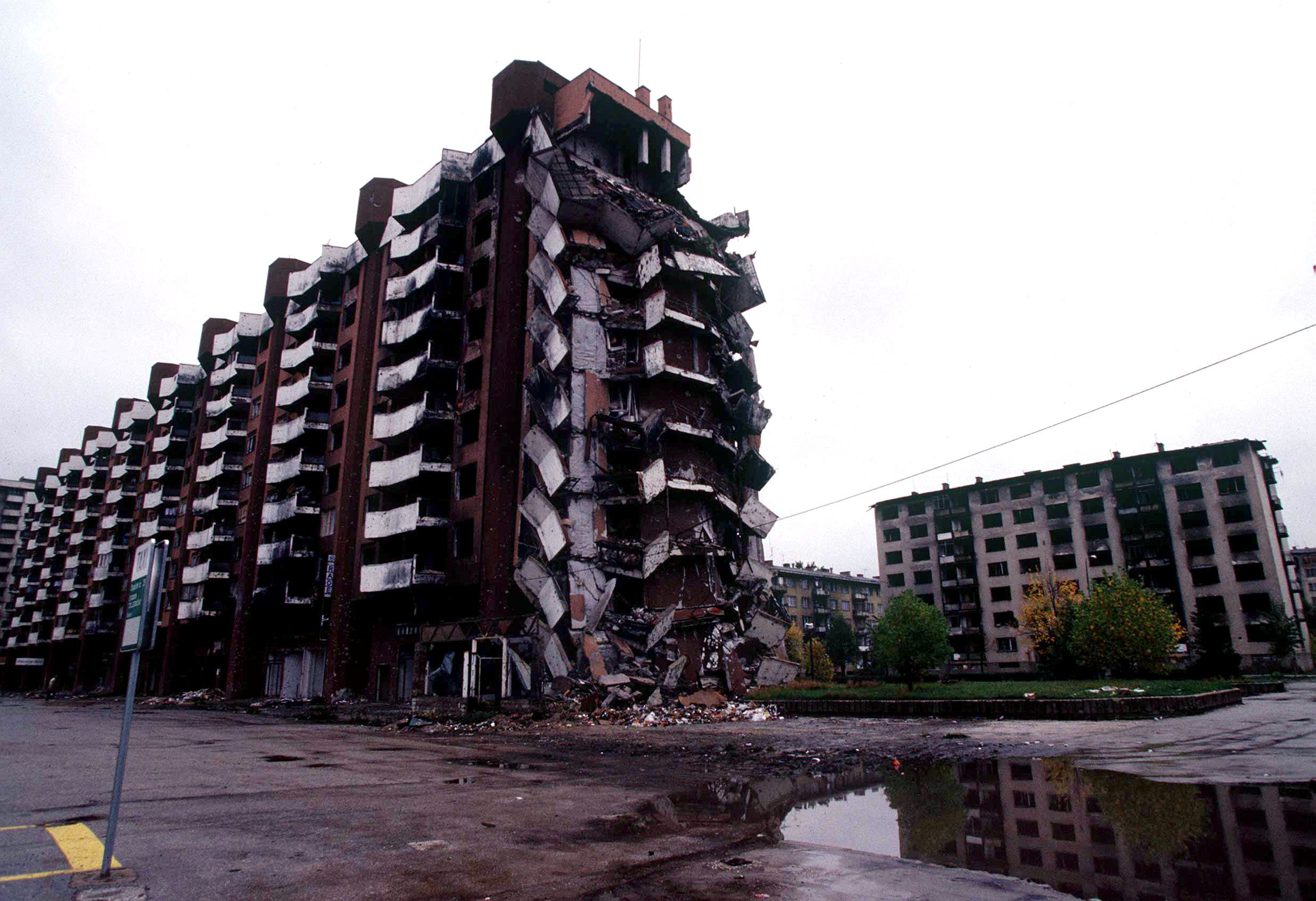
Destroyed residential area in Sarajevo (1996)

=== Background ===
In March 1992, a referendum in Bosnia and Herzegovina saw over 64% of voters support secession from Yugoslavia to establish an independent state. The vote was boycotted by the Serb population, which made up roughly half of Bosnia and Herzegovina's residents at the time, as it violated the constitution of the Federal Republic of Yugoslavia. On 5 April 1992, Bosnia and Herzegovina declared independence and was swiftly recognized by the international community. Following this, the mountains surrounding Sarajevo, a city nestled in the Miljacka river valley, were occupied by approximately 18,000 Serbian troops. By 2 May 1992, Serbian forces had completely blockaded the city.

In August 1995, following the second Markale massacre, international forces intervened. On 30 August, NATO and the United Nations launched Operation Deliberate Force, targeting Serbian positions around Sarajevo. The operation struck ammunition depots and military targets, gradually forcing Serbian withdrawal and enabling the restoration of central heating, electricity, and running water in the city. The Dayton Agreement, signed in Paris on 14 December 1995, ended the siege. By 22 December, thousands of Serbs had left the Sarajevo area, and on 29 February 1996, Serbian forces fully withdrew from the region.

Estimates suggest that during the siege, approximately 10,000 people, including 1,500 children, were killed or went missing in Sarajevo, with around 56,000 individuals, including 15,000 children, wounded. Due to the war and forced migration, Sarajevo's population in 1996 had decreased by 64% compared to the start of the siege.

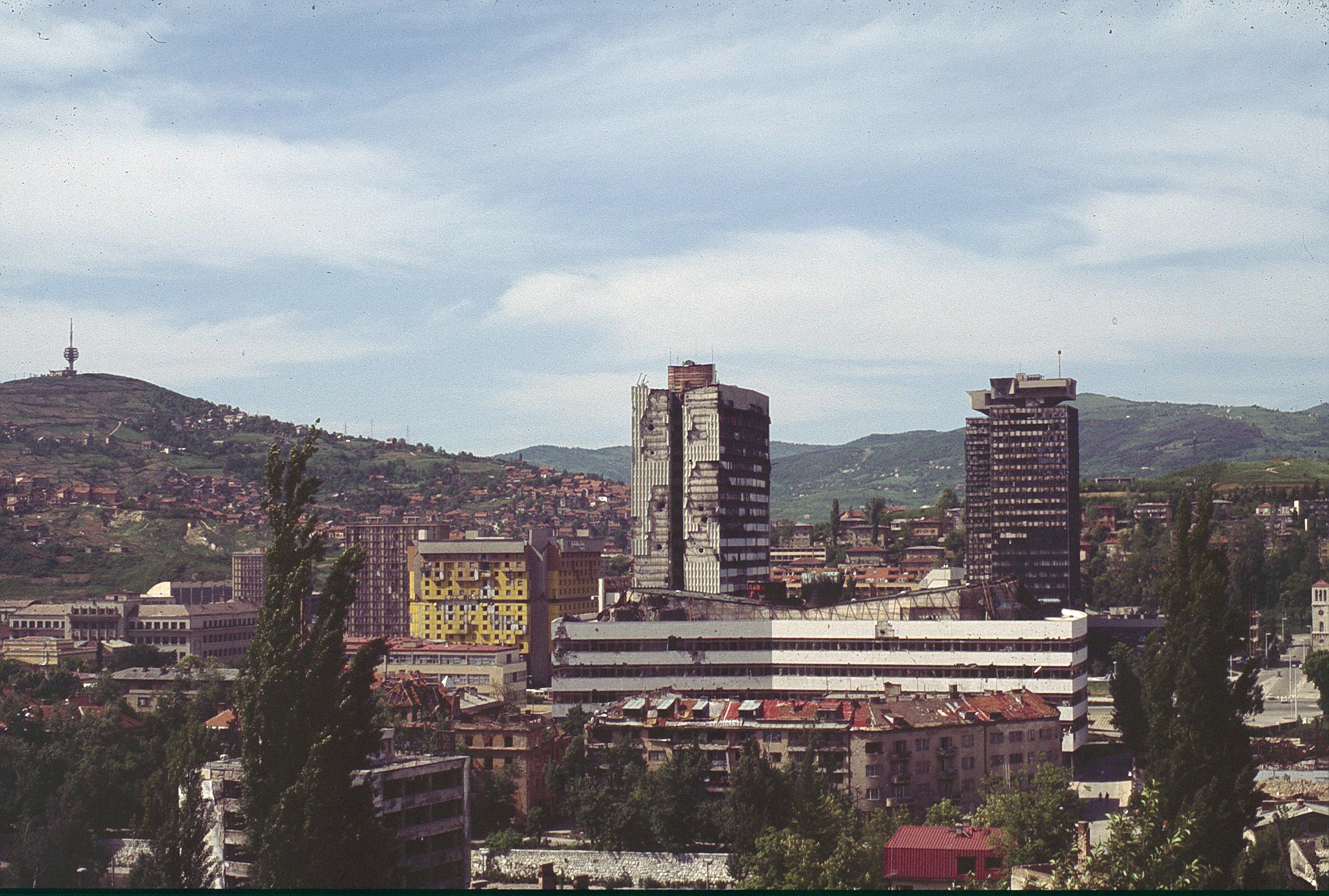
Sarajevo in May 1996

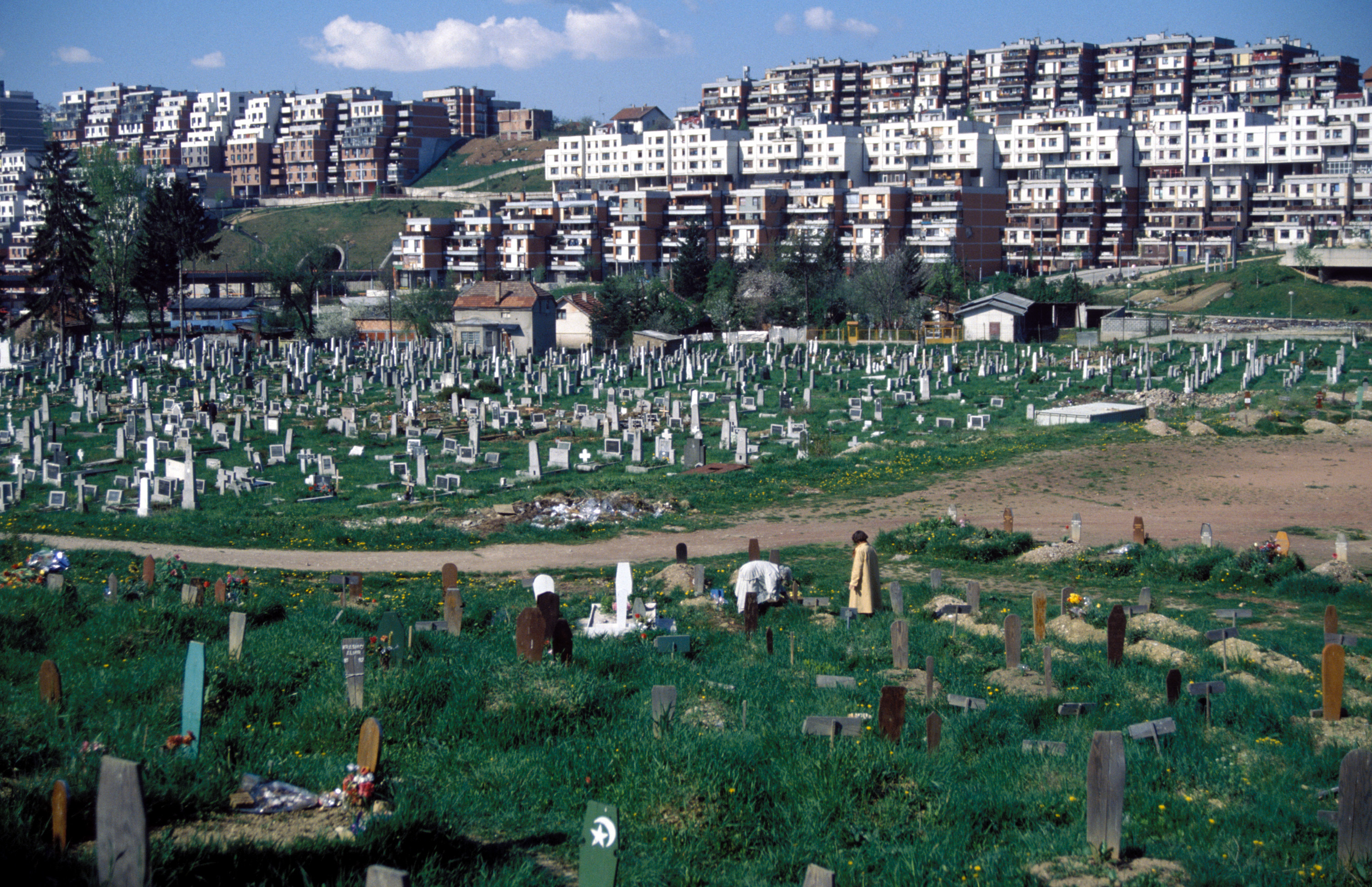
Sports facilities near Koševo City Stadium converted into a cemetery

=== Pre-event preparations ===
The idea for the meeting emerged in early May 1996, championed by International Association of Athletics Federations President Primo Nebiolo. That month, the International Association of Athletics Federations signed agreements with the Italian company Mondo to reconstruct the stadium's track and with Bosnian authorities to hold the event on 9 September at the refurbished venue. Organizational costs were shared between the International Association of Athletics Federations and the International Olympic Committee. A commemorative postage stamp, priced at $300, was issued, with all proceeds benefiting the Athletic Federation of Bosnia and Herzegovina. The European Broadcasting Union secured television broadcasts of the event.

Initial plans included men's events in the 100m, 400m, 1,500m, and 5,000m races, as well as high jump, pole vault, and shot put, and women's events in the 100m, 400m, 1,500m, 3,000m, and 100m hurdles, plus long jump and javelin throw.

On 7 September, the 1996 IAAF Grand Prix Final took place in Milan, after which over 100 top athletes were scheduled to travel to Bosnia and Herzegovina via charter flight. However, two days before the event, American Michael Johnson, the 1996 Olympic champion in the 400 meters, withdrew citing safety concerns. Algerian Noureddine Morceli, the 1,500 meters winner from Atlanta, pulled out due to a flu attack. British triple jump world record holder Jonathan Edwards also skipped the event after his event was dropped from the program. Russian Svetlana Masterkova withdrew at the last minute as well. International Association of Athletics Federations President Primo Nebiolo criticized the athletes who opted out.

Among those who attended were Olympic champions from Atlanta, including Kenyan Daniel Komen, American Charles Austin, and Swedish Ludmila Engquist. In an early September interview with the International Association of Athletics Federations, Komen said:

I will be in Sarajevo, and I believe it's very important for everyone to be there. This will be my first visit to the city, and I hope to forge a close bond with its people – a bond that will always hold a special place in my heart.

In August 1996, Jonathan Edwards appealed to hesitant athletes in the Italian newspaper Corriere della Sera, stating:

I understand the fears of some colleagues about traveling to Sarajevo just nine months after the ceasefire. But what does it say about us if we compete in Milan's IAAF Grand Prix Final for big prize money yet refuse to go to Sarajevo in a humanitarian gesture?

Athletes arrived in Sarajevo from Milan on the afternoon of Sunday, 8 September, and were accommodated at the centrally located Holiday Inn hotel, which had housed foreign journalists during the war.

=== Event ===
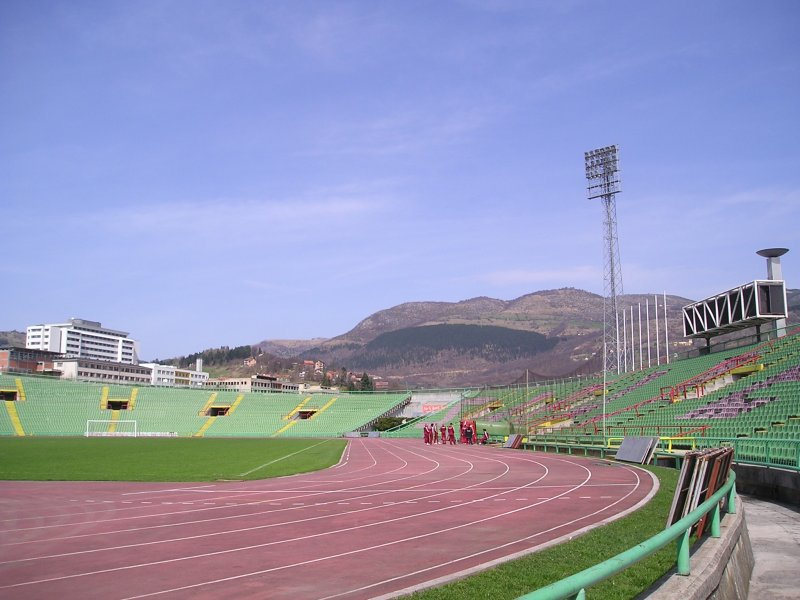
Koševo City Stadium in Sarajevo – present view

The organizing committee was chaired by Bosnian Prime Minister Haris Silajdžić. The meeting occurred on Monday, 9 September. Dignitaries in attendance included Bosnian President Alija Izetbegović and International Olympic Committee Vice President Kevan Gosper of Australia, standing in for the ailing Spaniard Juan Antonio Samaranch. In his opening remarks, Primo Nebiolo declared:

Welcome back, Sarajevo. Welcome back to world athletics! Welcome back to world sport!

His words were met with applause and tears. The ceremony featured children dancing on the stadium field, and the renovated stadium, funded by the International Olympic Committee and International Association of Athletics Federations, was officially reopened and handed over to the Athletic Federation of Bosnia and Herzegovina. The competition began at 3:30 PM Central European Time. Kenyan Vincent Malakwen achieved the world's best 1,000 meters time of 1996 – 2:15.89 – improving his personal best by 0.31 seconds. Athletes departed Sarajevo on the evening of 9 September. American high jumper Charles Austin reflected after leaving:

I couldn't ignore what I'd seen of this country on television, but I was confident it was safe to be there.

The event required significant funding and effort from the local athletics community. This took place in a city that had recently experienced civil unrest. Participants did not receive money or prizes; the goal was to provide an experience for the public.

== Results ==
=== Men ===
Event	1st place	Result	2nd place	Result	3rd place	Result	Source
100 m	(Nigeria) Osmond Ezinwa	10.34	(United Kingdom) Darren Campbell	10.52	(Nigeria) Deji Aliu	10.67	
400 m	(Nigeria) Sunday Bada	46.25	(Kenya) Samson Yego	46.66	(Cuba) Norberto Téllez	46.85	
1,000 m	(Kenya) Vincent Malakwen	2:15.89	(Kenya) William Tanui	2:16.60	(Kenya) Robert Kibet	2:16.80	
1,500 m	(Morocco) Hicham El Guerrouj	3:34.38	(Kenya) Daniel Komen	3:35.16	(Kenya) John Kosgei	3:35.78	
2,000 m	(United Kingdom) John Mayock	5:00.91	(Morocco) Salah Hissou	5:00.95	(Morocco) Ismaïl Sghyr	5:02.69	
High jump	(United States) Charles Austin	2.27	(Norway) Steinar Hoen	2.24	(Germany) Wolfgang Kreißig	2.21	
Pole vault	(Russia) Maksim Tarasov	5.70	(United States) Pat Manson	5.50	(Russia) Igor Trandenkov	5.50	
Hammer throw	(Hungary) Balázs Kiss	77.60	(Russia) Ilya Konovalov	75.48	(Hungary) Zsolt Németh	72.30	

=== Women ===
Event	1st place	Result	2nd place	Result	3rd place	Result	Source
100 m	(Nigeria) Chioma Ajunwa	11.43	(Russia) Marina Trandenkova	11.52	(Ukraine) Zhanna Pintusevich-Block	11.69	
400 m	(Nigeria) Olabisi Afolabi	53.60	(Israel) Orit Kolodni	53.97	(Italy) Fiorella Ferrari	56.34	
1,500 m	(Portugal) Carla Sacramento	4:15.37	(Russia) Yekaterina Podkopayeva	4:15.57	(Poland) Anna Brzezińska	4:15.82	
100 m hurdles	(Sweden) Ludmila Engquist	12.78	(Slovenia) Brigita Bukovec	12.98	(Switzerland) Julie Baumann	13.48	
Long jump	(Nigeria) Chioma Ajunwa	6.60	(Denmark) Renata Nielsen	6.24	(Russia) Yelena Sinchukova	6.16	
