= List of football stadiums in Bosnia and Herzegovina =

The following is a list of football stadiums in Bosnia and Herzegovina, ranked in order of capacity, with the minimum capacity being 2,000.

== Current stadiums ==
#	Image	Stadium	Capacity	City	Home team	Opened	UEFA rank
1		Stadion Asim Ferhatović-Hase	34,700	Sarajevo	FK Sarajevo	1947	2/4 stars
2		Stadion Bilino Polje	13,694	Zenica	NK Čelik and Bosnia and Herzegovina	1972	3/4 stars
3		Stadion Grbavica	13,057	Sarajevo	FK Željezničar and Bosnia and Herzegovina	1953	3/4 stars
4		Banja Luka City Stadium	10,030	Banja Luka	FK Borac	1937	3/4 stars
5		Stadion pod Bijelim Brijegom	9,000	Mostar	HŠK Zrinjski	1971	3/4 stars
6		Stadion Police	8,550	Trebinje	FK Leotar	n/a	
7		Stadion Banovići	8,500	Banovići	FK Budućnost	n/a	
8		Stadion pod Borićima	7,504	Bihać	NK Jedinstvo	1983	
9		Stadion Tušanj	7,200	Tuzla	FK Sloboda Tuzla	1957	
10		Stadion Rođeni	7,000	Mostar	FK Velež	1995	3/4 stars
11		Stadion Dr. Milan Jelić	6,000	Modriča	FK Modriča	1962	
12		Stadion Bijeljina	6,000	Bijeljina	FK Radnik	1954	
13		Stadion SRC Slavija	6,000	Istočno Sarajevo	FK Slavija	n/a	
14		Stadion Prijedor	6,000	Prijedor	FK Rudar	n/a	
15		Stadion Pecara	5,147	Široki Brijeg	NK Široki Brijeg	1953	3/4 stars
16		Stadion Mokri Dolac	5,040	Posušje	HŠK Posušje	n/a	
17		Stadion Laktaši	5,000	Laktaši	FK Laktaši	n/a	
18		Stadion Banja Ilidža	5,000	Gradačac	NK Zvijezda	n/a	
19		Stadion Pirota	4,000	Travnik	NK Travnik	n/a	
20		Stadion Žepče	4,000	Žepče	NK Žepče	n/a	
21		Stadion Vitez	3,500	Vitez	NK Vitez	1993	
22		Stadion Krupa na Vrbasu	3,500	Krupa na Vrbasu	FK Krupa	n/a	
23		Stadion Otoka	3,000	Sarajevo	FK Olimpik	1993	
24		Stadion Perica-Pero Pavlović	3,000	Gabela	NK GOŠK Gabela	1959	
25		Stadion Orašje	3,000	Orašje	HNK Orašje	n/a	
26		Stadion Luke	2,000	Mrkonjić Grad	FK Sloboda Mrkonjić Grad	n/a	

== See also ==
- List of European stadiums by capacity
- List of association football stadiums by capacity
- Lists of stadiums
