= Krive karte =

2022 single by Dino Merlin

Single by Dino Merlin

from the album Mi
- Language: Bosnian
- Released: 31 March 2022
- Genre: Ethno-pop
- Length: 4:37
- Label: Magaza
- Songwriter: Edin Dervišhalidović

Dino Merlin singles chronology
"Jedan dan, jedna noć" (2021)	"Krive karte" (2022)	"Kako da ti kažem" (2022)

Music video
- "Krive karte" on YouTube

"Krive karte" (Note: Stylised in all uppercase.) (transl. "Wrong cards") is a song by Bosnian singer-songwriter Dino Merlin, released on 31 March 2022. The song peaked at number ten on the Croatia Songs chart and number 36 on the HR Top 40.

== Background and release ==
Edin Dervišhalidović, known professionally as Dino Merlin, had previously released the collaborative single "Dođi" and the ballad "Jedan dan, jedna noć" in 2021. "Krive karte" was written by Dervišhalidović and mixed and mastered by Mahir Sarihodžić. It was released on the same day as his other song "Kako da ti kažem" on 31 March 2022.

== Composition ==
Sometimes life gives us the wrong cards, but that’s why we have "the right hands" so we can reach out to others, with the open hearts and with a desire to create something new. This is my way of telling someone who is important to me that I am sorry, that I care and that I would like to be forgiven.

— Dino Merlin

Dervišhalidović stated in an interview with the Croatian newspaper Večernji list that the song was "quite unusual" in that it was a "kind of apology from me to the person I hurt and who I care about a lot." The lyrics "and I will change the city, I will change myself, I'll look for a way" are about the singer convincing a former partner that he has changed, after having mistreated them.

"Krive karte" and ""Kako da ti kažem" are described by Dervišhalidović as being "different paths to the same destination" with the latter written to be played directly after "Krive karte". The singer stated in a press release that "one song was not enough" because the story was "very important" to him.

== Music video ==
The music video was filmed in the BHRT building in Sarajevo and made in partnership with BH Telecom and Samsung. Edvin Kalić was the director and script writer, Igor Lazić was the director of photography and Marko Feher was the costume designer. Dervišhalidović commented that the BHRT building was where his career began and that it would be a "generational shame if the light stops burning".

== Critical reception ==
Elvir Pelešević of EuroVisionary described the song as an "emotional ethno-pop ballad" that "relates to all the people who once in the life have burned the bridges between them" whilst Jonathan Vautrey of Wiwibloggs described the song as a "mid-tempo Balkan pop ballad". Vautrey added that Dervišhalidović's other song "Kako da ti kažem", which translates as "How can I tell you", had a "very similar lyrical theme" but was "much brighter and [had] a more hopeful pop sound".

On 16 April 2022, "Krive karte" peaked at number ten on Croatia Songs, a record chart compiled by Billboard.

== Charts ==
Weekly chart performance for "Krive karte"
Chart (2022)	Peak position
Croatia (Billboard)	10
Croatia Domestic Airplay (Top lista)	36
