= Najljepše pjesme =

Greatest hits album by Dino Merlin
- Released: 1995
- Recorded: 1984–1994
- Genre: Pop, Rock, Ballad
- Length: 46:31
- Label: Nimfa Sound

Dino Merlin chronology
Balade (1995)	Najljepše pjesme (1995)	Rest of the Best (1997)

Najljepše pjesme (trans. The most beautiful songs) is a compilation album of Dino Merlin with the Merlin band as well. This compilation album was released in 1995.

== Track listing ==
1. Učini mi pravu stvar (released 1990)
2. Nešto lijepo treba da se desi (released 1989)
3. Moja bogda sna (released 1993)
4. Vojnik sreće (released 1993)
5. Zaboravi (released 1993)
6. Pala magla (released 1990)
7. Nek' padaju ćuskije (released 1986)
8. Danas sam OK (released 1989)
9. Kad zamirišu jorgovani (rock version; released 1989)
10. Kokuzna vremena (released 1985)
11. Bosnom behar probeharao (released 1989)
12. Mjesečina (released 1989)
