= Live: Vječna vatra =

Live album by Dino Merlin
- Released: 1999
- Recorded: July 23, 1998 in Sarajevo
- Genres: Pop-rock; Folk-rock

Dino Merlin chronology
Fotografija (1995)	Live: Vječna vatra (1999)	Sredinom (2000)

Live: Vječna vatra (trans. Live: Eternal flame) is the first live album by Dino Merlin, released in 1999.

Originally released as a double album "Vječna vatra" contains all of Dino Merlin's best hit singles recorded live.

== Track listing ==
=== Disc 1 ===
1. "Smijehom strah pokrijem" (studio)
2. "Jel' Sarajevo gdje je nekad bilo"
3. "Vojnik sreće"
4. "Zar je to sve što je ostalo"
5. "Učini mi pravu stvar"
6. "Da ti kažem šta mi je"
7. "Nešto lijepo treba da se desi"
8. "Kokuzna vremena"
9. "Moja bogda sna"
10. "Uspavanka za Gorana B."

=== Disc 2 ===
1. "De facto Fato"
2. "Mjesečina"
3. "Danas sam O.K."
4. "Nemam ja 18 godina"
5. "Ja potpuno trijezan umirem"
6. "Ne zovi me na grijeh"
7. "Paša moj solidni"
8. "Bosnom behar probeharao"
9. "Fotografija"
