= Hotel Nacional (album) =

2014 Dino Merlin album

Studio album by Dino Merlin
- Released: 20 June 2014
- Recorded: 2008–2014
- Genre: pop, disco
- Label: MP BHRT; Croatia Records; Magaza
- Producer: Dino Merlin (executive), Yoad Nevo, Richard Niles, Baby Dooks

Dino Merlin chronology
| Ispočetka (2008) | Hotel Nacional (2014) | Mi (2025) |

Singles from Hotel Nacional
- 1. "Ruža" Released: 20 May 2014; 2. "Školjka" Released: 15 June 2014; 3. "Sunce" Released: 1 October 2014; 4. "Sve do medalje" Released: 28 November 2014; 5. "Rane" Released: 15 May 2015

Hotel Nacional is the sixth solo studio album by Bosnian singer-songwriter Dino Merlin. It was released on 20 June 2014 by his independent label Magaza and Croatia Records as the follow-up to his album Ispočetka, released in 2008. Production of the album was led by Dervišhalidović himself alongside Yoad Nevo, Richard Niles, Baby Dooks, Marcos Ubeda, Gunnar Norden and longtime collaborators Mahir Sarihodžić and Mahir Beathouse.

Upon release the album debuted at number 8 on the Billboard World Albums chart, making it the only album from the region to be featured on the chart. The subsequent Hotel Nacional World Tour attracted more than 750,000 people during four years of running, an unprecedented feat in the touring industry of Southeastern Europe.

== Background ==
After completing the tour Ispočetka promoting his 10th studio album of the same name which sold over 700.000 tickets during the course of 4 years, Dino Merlin took a break from music and performing. The hiatus lasted for around 18 months during which most of the recording for the new album took place.

In several interviews Dervišhalidović described his songwriting process as being "organic" meaning that Dino, unlike many others, never consciously starts writing a song, instead he waits for "the song to come to him". Hence, the time it takes for him to finish a song takes considerably longer in comparison to other songwriters. The amount of time it takes for Dino's songs to write songs was evident with the album as it took almost 6 years to write all the songs for the album.

On 16 June 2011, Dervišhalidović released the single Undo. Critics as well as the audience remarked that the song was unlike any other he had produced during his career as it featured a very modern arrangement, with electronic, alternative rock and dubstep elements. The song was later included in the album. Because it was released before the other singles and because it also reliably represented the new sound of the upcoming album, Undo served as the album's de facto first unofficial single.

== Recording ==
=== Sarajevo ===
Recording of the album took place in Dervišhalidović's studio in his hometown of Sarajevo in the neighborhood of Ilidža with his longtime collaborators Mahir Beathouse and Mahir Sarihodžić. In Sarajevo, most of the demo tracks and the album's initial sound was created during the period of two years. Sessions occurred irregularly, which was in line with Dino's timing of songwriting, with some sessions lasting up to a couple of weeks and then followed by a hiatus of several months.

=== Zagreb ===
Beside his collaborators in Sarajevo, Dervišhalidović's also spent a great deal of time in Zagreb operating from his apartment at park Zrinjevac. The opening single of Ispočetka, the song Dabogda was produced by DJ and music producer David Vurdelja aka Baby Dooks whom Dino met at a late night studio session while wrapping up the album in 2008. The song in collaboration with Hari Mata Hari, a well known regional singer, ended up hitting the charts and becoming the biggest hit of the year in the region. Dabogda was the only song Dino Merlin worked on with Baby Dooks during the recording of album Ispočetka. Their collaboration continued and resulted in producing the first major single from Hotel Nacional and probably the biggest hit on the record Školjka.

=== London ===
During early 2011, Dervišhalidović took a trip to London to meet his friend and music producer Srdjan Kurpjel with whom he collaborated on both Burek and Ispočetka. Kurpjel introduced him to fellow London based producer Yoad Nevo who at the time worked with some of the most iconic British acts to date - Pet Shop Boys, Sugababes, Sophie Ellis-Bextor etc. Yoad Nevo while firstly recruited to produce his Eurovision Song Contest entry Love in Rewind, was later involved in additional and post-production of almost all of the songs and is credited for mixing end engineering the sound for Hotel Nacional.

=== Stockholm ===
During the previous Ispočetka tour, Dervišhalidović participated in the Eurovision Song Contest 2011 in Düsseldorf performing the song "Love in Rewind" in early 2011. During rehearsals he befriended the Swedish delegation and Marcos Ubeda, the producer of the Eurovision Song Contest 1999 winning song "Take Me to Your Heaven". Marcos later contributed to producing the single "Hotel Nacional" after which the album was named in 2014. Later during the year, Dino was also introduced to famed jazz producer Gunnar Norden, who recorded and produced the third single of the album "Sunce".

== Release ==
During the spring of 2014 heavy flooding hit the region with Dervišhalidović home country being hit the most. Tens of thousands of people were affected and thousands of homes were destroyed. In order to raise awareness and aid money, Dino Merlin partnered with the Red Cross of Bosnia and Herzegovina, Croatia and Serbia to publish the song Ruža. The video featured footage from the effects of flooding and its disastrous consequences while featuring Red Cross telephone numbers on which money could be donated. Apart from releasing the song Ruža, Dervišhalidović was actively involved in alleviating the pain caused by the disasters by visiting the affected sites by flooding as well as donating to the affected population in both Bosnia and Serbia. The natural disasters that affected the region postponed the launch of the album which was planned in early May 2014.

In June 2014 a campaign promoting the new album was slowly taking place. On 15 June 2014, the single Školjka was published worldwide during the halftime of Bosnia's first ever football world cup performance. The song was released on YouTube, iTunes and Deezer and recorded over 100,000 YouTube views during the first 24 hours upon release. The song rose quickly to popularity and was featured in almost every halftime commercial break on national television during the world cup.

Just days later, on 19 June 2014, Dervišhalidović released a photo on his Facebook profile of him holding the cover of the album Hotel Nacional. The cover featured an inverted photo of him looking back at his childhood neighborhood of Alifakovac in Sarajevo. The following day, 20 June 2014, the album was released to iTunes, Amazon and Deezer and was distributed in hard copy across the region. Accompanying the launch of the album, a renewed official website was launched, as well as a nationwide promotional campaign with billboards set all across the country. In neighboring Croatia, the album was published by the nation's biggest record label - Croatia Records. In Serbia, the sale of the album was upheld due to legal issues with the partnering record label City Records. Due to successful sales in its first week after release, the album debuted at number 8 on the Billboard World Albums list. Hotel Nacional is the first and only album from the region to be included in such a list.

== Track listing ==
| No. | Title | Writer(s) | Producer(s) | Length |
|---|---|---|---|---|
| 1. | "Ruža" | Dino Merlin | Dino Merlin, Mahir Sarihodžić, Mahir Beathouse, Yoad Nevo | 5:21 |
| 2. | "Školjka" | Džemaludin Latić | Dino Merlin, David Vurdelja, Yoad Nevo | 4:56 |
| 3. | "Sve Dok Te Bude Imalo" | Dino Merlin | Dino Merlin, Mahir Beathouse, Almir Buza, Yoad Nevo | 5:15 |
| 4. | "Moja Mala Židovko" | Dino Merlin | Dino Merlin, Mahir Beathouse, Mahir Sarihodžić, Yoad Nevo | 4:34 |
| 5. | "Rane" | Džemaludin Latić, Dino Merlin | Dino Merlin, Vlado Džihan, Mahir Beathouse | 4:20 |
| 6. | "Uzmi Ovaj Dar" | Dino Merlin, Walt Whitman, Mahir BeatHouse | Dino Merlin, Zvonimir Dusper Dus | 4:46 |
| 7. | "Ako Izgovorim Ljubav" | Aaron McIntosh, Dino Merlin | Dino Merlin, Aaron McIntosh | 4:05 |
| 8. | "Hotel Nacional" | Dino Merlin | Dino Merlin, David Vurdelja, Marcos Ubeda | 4:05 |
| 9. | "Sunce" | Dino Merlin | Dino Merlin, Gunnar Norden | 4:17 |
| 10. | "Sve Do Medalje" | Dino Merlin | Dino Merlin, Enes Tvrtković, Yoad Nevo | 5:27 |
| 11. | "Undo" | Dino Merlin | Dino Merlin, Mahir Beathouse, Mahir Sarihodžić | 4:05 |
| 12. | "Hotel Nacional Nevo Mix" | Dino Merlin | Dino Merlin, David Vurdelja, Yoad Nevo | 4:06 |

== Charts ==
=== Weekly charts ===
Weekly chart performance for Hotel Nacional
| Chart (2014) | Peak position |
|---|---|
| US World Albums (Billboard) | 8 |
