= Jedna si jedina =

Former national anthem of Bosnia and Herzegovina (1992–1998)

English: You're the One and Only
- Једна си једина
- Former national anthem of the Republic of Bosnia and Herzegovina
- Lyrics: Dino Merlin, 1992
- Music: Unknown, arranged by Dino Merlin
- Adopted: November 1992 (de facto); 24 November 1995 (de jure)
- Relinquished: 10 February 1998
- Preceded by: "Hej, Slaveni"
- Succeeded by: "National Anthem of Bosnia and Herzegovina"

Audio sample
- Digital instrumental rendition in F-sharp major: [[:File:|file]]; help

"Jedna si jedina" ('You're the One and Only') was the national anthem of Bosnia and Herzegovina between 1992 and 1998.

== History ==
The music was adapted from the traditional Bosnian folk song "S one strane Plive" ('On the Other Side of Pliva'), which is believed to have been inspired by the Turkish song "Sivastopol Marşı". The lyrics were written by Bosnian singer Dino Merlin; and this version is featured on his 1993 album, Moja Bogda Sna. It was adopted in November 1992, several months after independence in March 1992. Political leaders of dominant Bosnian Serb and Bosnian Croat nationalist parties objected to it, and thus a new composition, the "Intermezzo", was approved and adopted by the United Nations as the country's national anthem in 1999.

=== Legacy ===
"Jedna si jedina" is still regarded as the de facto national anthem of Bosnia and Herzegovina by many Bosniaks. Many Bosniaks still sing this song during performances of the Bosnian national anthem, as they believe that it should still be current as the present national anthem of Bosnia and Herzegovina does not have any official lyrics.

== Lyrics ==
On most occasions, only the first verse, chorus, and second verse were performed.

=== Former official ===
Bosnian (Latin)

Zemljo tisućljetna,
na vjernost ti se kunem.
Od mora do Save
od Drine do Une.

Pripjev:
Jedna si, jedina,
moja domovina.
Jedna si jedina
Bosna i Hercegovina.

Bog nek’ te sačuva
za pokoljenja nova.
Zemljo mojih snova,
mojih pradjedova.

Pripjev

Teško onoj ruci
koja ti zaprijeti
Sinovi i kćeri
za te će umrijeti

Pripjev

Bosnian (Cyrillic)

Земљо тисућљетна,
на вјерност ти се кунем.
Од мора до Саве
од Дрине до Уне.

Припјев:
Једна си, једина,
моја домовина.
Једна си једина
Босна и Херцеговина.

Бог нек’ те сачува
за покољења нова.
Земљо мојих снова,
мојих прадједова.

Припјев

Тешко оној руци
која ти запријети
Синови и кћери
за те ће умријети

Припјев

English translation

Land of a thousand years,
I pledge my loyalty to you.
From the sea to the Sava
from the Drina to the Una.

Chorus:
You're the one and only,
My homeland.
You're the one and only,
Bosnia and Herzegovina.

May God save you
For generations to come.
You're the land of my dreams,
The land of my forefathers.

Chorus

Woe to the hand
That threatens you.
Your sons and daughters
Will die for you.

Chorus

=== Alternate version ===
Bosnian (Latin)

Preko tamnih gora
Od Save do mora
Na vjernost ti se kunem
Od Drine do Une

Pripev:
Jedna si, jedina
Naša domovina
Jedna si, jedina
Bosna i Hercegovina

Teško onoj ruci
Koja ti zaprijeti
Sinovi i kćeri
Za te će umrijeti

Pripev

Bog neka te čuva
Za pokoljenja nova
Zemljo krvi naše
Naših pradjedova

Pripev

Bosnian (Cyrillic)

Преко тамних гора
Од Саве до мора
На вјерност ти се кунем
Од Дрине до Уне

Припев:
Једна си, једина
Наша домовина
Једна си, једина
Босна и Херцеговина

Тешко оној руци
Која ти запријети
Синови и кћери
За те ће умријети

Припев

Бог нека те чува
За покољења нова
Земљо крви наше
Наших прадједова

Припев

English translation

Over the dark mountains,
From the Sava to the sea.
I pledge my loyalty to you,
From the Drina to the Una.

Chorus:
You're the one and only,
Our homeland.
You're the one and only,
Bosnia and Herzegovina.

Woe to the hand,
That threatens you.
Your sons and daughters,
Will die for you.

Chorus

May God save you
For generations to come.
The land of our blood,
Of our great-grandfathers.

Chorus

== See also ==
- List of Bosnia and Herzegovina patriotic songs
