= Dino Merlin =

Bosnian singer, songwriter, record producer (born 1962)

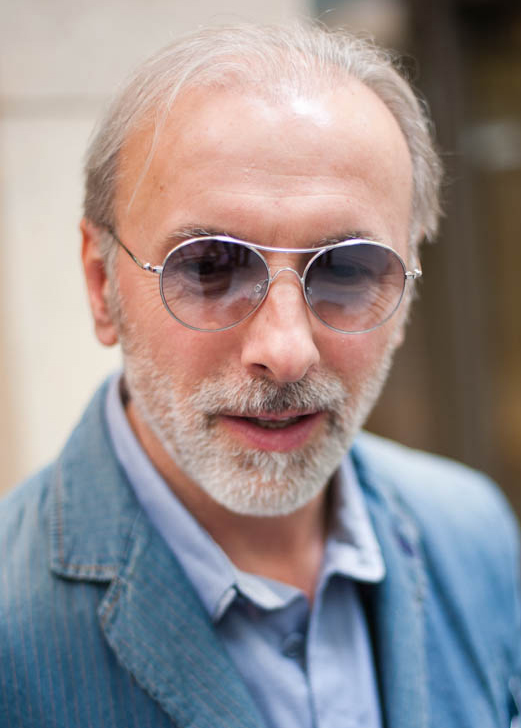
- Dino in 2011
- Born: Edin Dervišhalidović; 12 September 1962 (age 64); Sarajevo, SR Bosnia and Herzegovina, FPR Yugoslavia
- Spouse: Amela Dervišhalidović (m. 1980)
- Children: 2
- Musical career
- Genres: Pop-rock, ethno-pop, pop, disco, world
- Occupations: Musician, singer-songwriter, record producer
- Instruments: Vocals, guitar, bass, keyboards
- Years active: 1983–present
- Labels: Magaza, Croatia Records
- Website: dinomerlin.com

Edin Dervišhalidović (born 12 September 1962), known professionally as Dino Merlin, is a Bosnian singer-songwriter and record producer. Nicknamed "The Wizard" (Bosnian: Čarobnjak), he is widely regarded as one of the most prominent and commercially successful artists to have emerged from the former Yugoslavia.

Born in Sarajevo in 1962, Dino founded and led the band Merlin, one of the best-selling rock groups in Southeast Europe. Over a career spanning more than four decades, he has released over a dozen critically and commercially successful albums, embarked on numerous record-breaking tours, and received many honors, including the Sixth of April Sarajevo Award in 2017.

Beyond his solo career, Merlin has played a significant role in the cultural history of Bosnia and Herzegovina. He wrote the lyrics to "Jedna si jedina", the national anthem of the Republic of Bosnia and Herzegovina. During the Bosnian War, he wrote and composed "Sva bol svijeta", performed by Fazla as Bosnia and Herzegovina's first-ever entry in the Eurovision Song Contest 1993. Merlin later represented his country twice at Eurovision: in 1999 with "Putnici", and in 2011 with "Love in Rewind", which achieved sixth place—one of Bosnia and Herzegovina's best results in the competition.

He is celebrated for his distinctive voice, charismatic stage presence, and poetic songwriting.

== Early life ==
Edin Dervišhalidović was born on 12 September 1962, in the neighbourhood of Alifakovac in Sarajevo, People's Republic of Bosnia and Herzegovina (at the time part of the Socialist Federal Republic of Yugoslavia). His father, Abid, was a carpenter who came to Sarajevo as a teenager. His mother, Fatima (née Činjarević), was born and raised in Sarajevo, and was a Muslim cleric. Edin has a younger sister, Amina. His parents divorced when he was 7 years old and he was subsequently raised by his mother.

Dervišhalidović attended Moris Moco Salom primary school (today "Edhem Mulabdić" elementary school), where he was the captain of the school's soccer, basketball, and table tennis teams. The school and its significant surroundings – Emperor's Mosque, President Tito's konak, and Hotel Nacional – influenced his later art.

Dervišhalidović enrolled at Sarajevo Technical High School. During after-school hours, he performed in a music duo with his childhood friend and keyboardist Mensur Lutvica, with whom he later established the band Merlin.

== Music career ==
=== Early years ===
Although Dervišhalidović's mother was against the idea of her son being a musician, she helped him buy his first guitar when he was 12 years old. He penned his first song at 14 years old. Dervišhalidović was mostly self-taught, although he did take a few lessons from an older neighbour named Mirsad. Mirsad's younger brother, Mensur Lutvica, played the keyboard and attended the same school as Dervišhalidović. They soon became friends and eventually became the founding members of the later band 'Merlin'. Lutvica began accompanying Dervišhalidović while performing on the streets of Sarajevo.

Dervišhalidović was heavily influenced by the Yugoslavian musicians Bijelo Dugme, Zdravko Čolić, Kemal Monteno, and Toma Zdravković, among others. He entered several music competitions covering their songs. He later became close friends with Goran Bregović, the founder and primary songwriter of Bijelo Dugme.

After enrolling in university, Dervišhalidović formed a band with Lutvica on keyboard, Amir "Tula" Bjelanović on guitar, Džafer Saračević on drums, and Enver Milišić on bass guitar. Each of the five put a paper with their idea for a band name in a hat; the name "Merlin" was pulled and chosen as the name of the band.

=== Merlin ===
After completing his first semester at university, Dervišhalidović dropped out to pursue a music career. However, he did not have enough money to rent a recording studio. During this time, he married his girlfriend Amela and worked two shifts a day at a metal factory in the suburbs of Sarajevo for a few years. It was during this time that he started writing most of the songs which would later appear on his first album.

In 1984, Dervišhalidović rented a local studio in Sarajevo owned by producer Brano Likić. Dervišhalidović wrote all the recorded songs and paid the recording fees from his funds. He was rejected by every major record label in Sarajevo. At the same time, Dervišhalidović's private funds were only enough for 6 songs. During the recording session for the final song, a local A&R agent named Muradif Brkić entered the studio where Dervišhalidović and Likić were mixing a song. After listening to the track, "Kokuzna Vremena", a couple of times, Brkić offered Dervišhalidović a contract with his record label Sarajevo Disk and agreed to finance the remainder of the song recordings. Merlin eventually released their first album in 1985 titled Kokuzna vremena. With the band, Dervišhalidović has recorded 5 studio albums: Kokuzna vremena in 1985, Teško meni sa tobom in 1986, Merlin in 1987, Nešto lijepo treba da se desi in 1989, and Peta strana svijeta in 1990.

=== Solo career ===
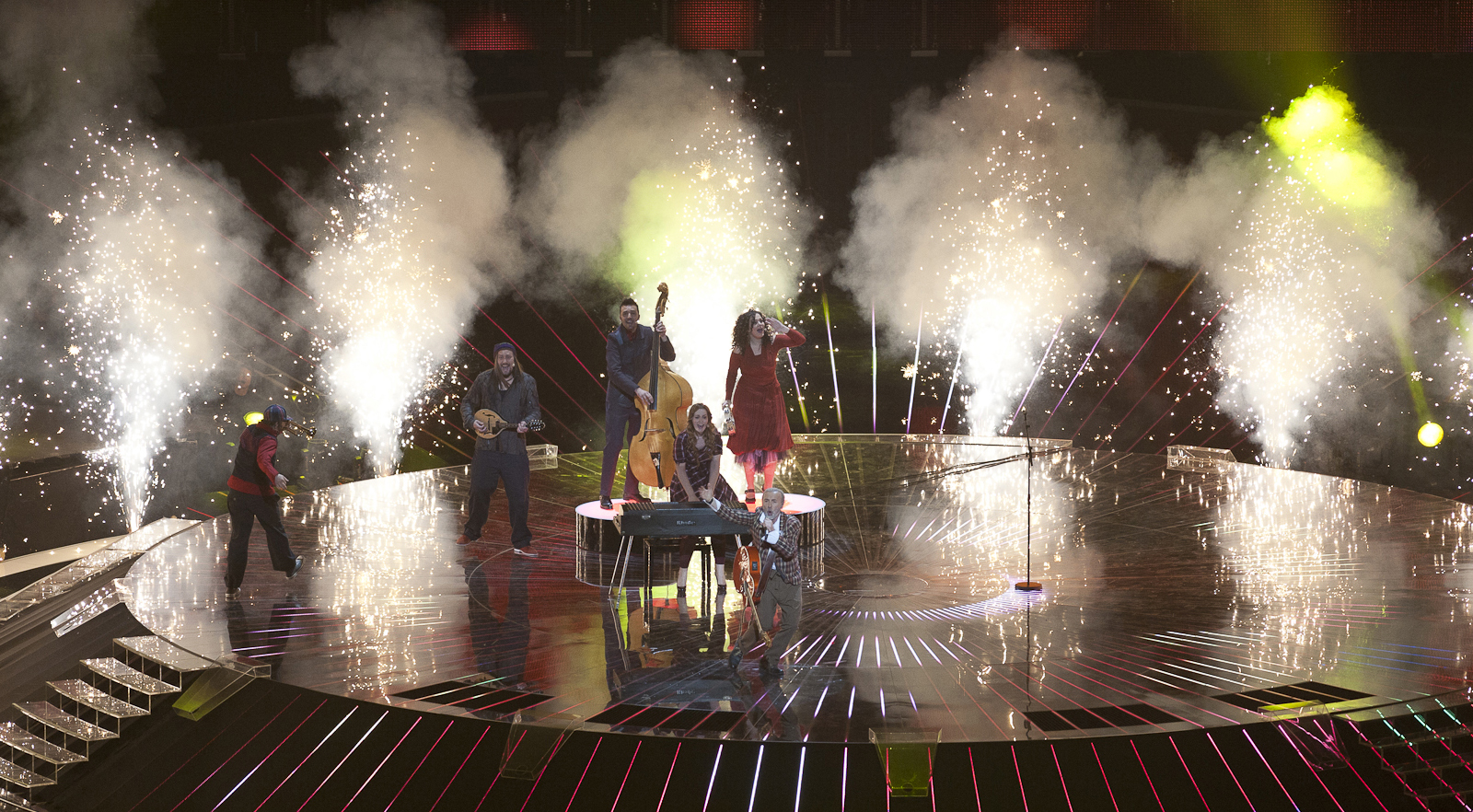
Dino performing at Eurovision Song Contest 2011

Dervišhalidović began his solo career under the name Dino Merlin in 1991 and has since recorded seven studio albums: Moja bogda sna in 1993, Fotografija in 1995, Sredinom in 2000, Burek in 2004, Ispočetka in 2008, Hotel Nacional in 2014, and Mi in 2025.

During the Bosnian War, several members of Merlin were killed, including their long-time manager Kemal Bisić, with whom Dino was close.

Not long after the band dissolved, Dino was invited by the Bosnian state government to write the country's first-ever national anthem, "Jedna si jedina". The song acted as the state's national anthem until the late 1990s. In 1993, he wrote the song "Sva bol svijeta" ("All the grief in the world") for and eventually participated in Bosnia's first Eurovision Song Contest in Millstreet in 1993. The song is about the hardships Bosnians endured during the war and calls for peace. He again participated in the Eurovision Song Contests in Jerusalem in 1999 (singing "Putnici" with Béatrice Poulot, a French singer) and in 2011 with "Love in Rewind". Dervišhalidović has also taken part in other big European festivals, such as the Copenhagen festival in 1996 and the Turkovision Song Contest in 1997.

==== Breaking records, major success ====
In 2000, Dino released his most successful album to date - Sredinom ("Through the Middle"). The album was a top-selling album in Bosnia and Herzegovina and was sold in all of the former Yugoslav republics.

The album became a classic and was the highest-selling album in the region in 30 years. Some estimates put the album sales at about 2,000,000.

The subsequent tour promoting Sredinom included over 200 concerts with a performance at the Koševo City Stadium in Sarajevo in front of an audience of about 80,000. This was the largest crowd ever to assemble in the national stadium in Bosnia's history. Dervišhalidović subsequently performed three more times at this stadium and is the only artist ever to have filled this venue on four occasions.

==== Current success, Billboard recognition ====
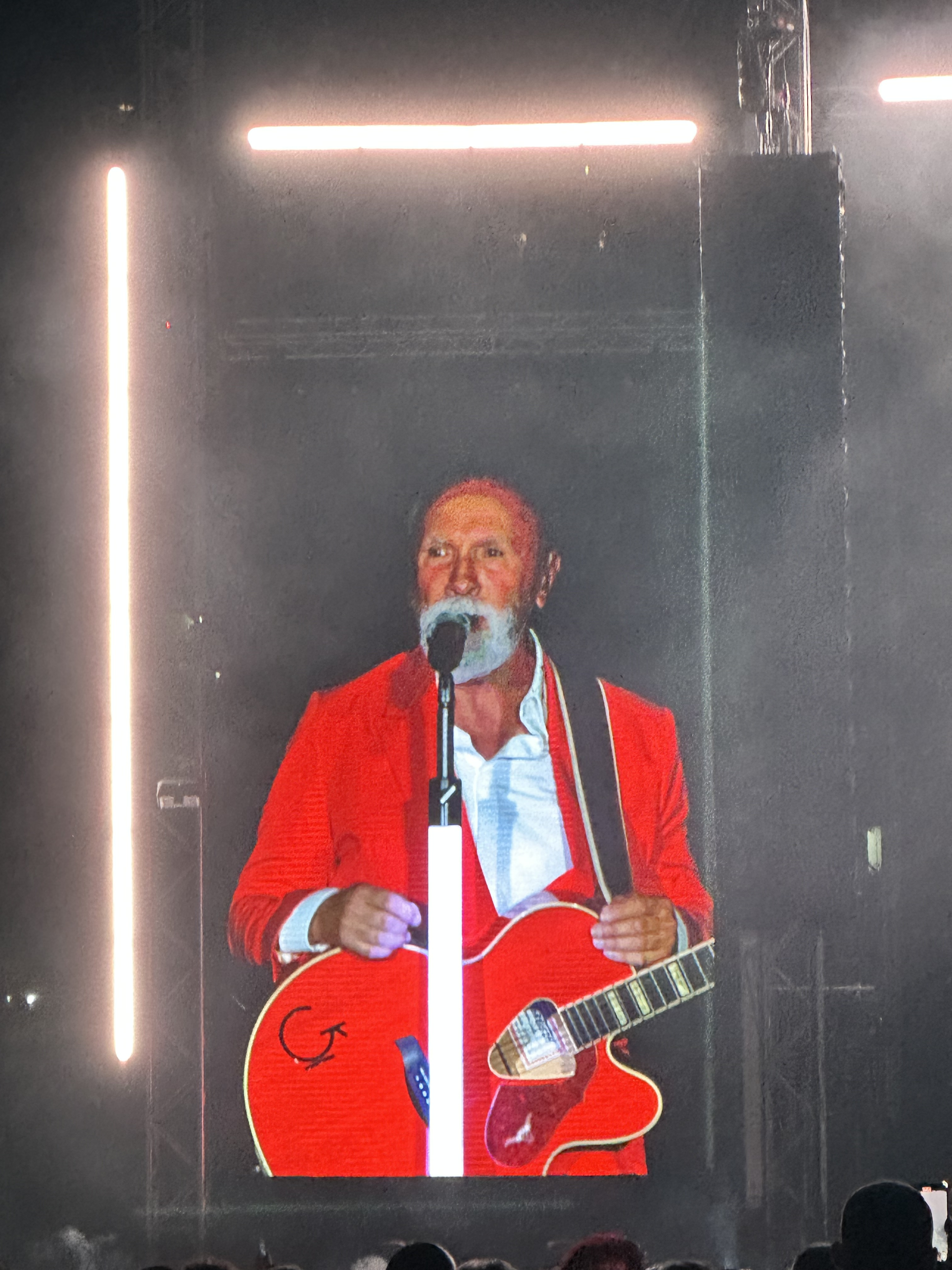
Dino performing in 2025

After a six-year hiatus, Dino returned to the stage with his eleventh album Hotel Nacional. It was released in June 2014 and was featured in the top 10 on the Billboard World Albums list upon release due to unprecedented online sales in the region. This is the only album from Slavic-speaking Europe ever to chart on Billboard. The album featured Yoad Nevo, Richard Niles, Hüsnü Şenlendirici, and others. 900,000 people attended The Hotel National World Tour across 4 continents. It is the largest tour ever to have been produced by an artist from Southeast Europe.

Dino released his song "Mi" in October 2020, followed by "Dođi" at the start of 2021, and two more songs ("Mir svim dobrim ljudima" and "Jedan dan, jedna noć") in May.

== Personal life ==
Dino resides in his hometown of Sarajevo, in the same house and street where he was born and raised, in the neighbourhood of Alifakovac. He has two children, Naida and Hamza.

Dino is an avid chess player, skier, art collector, and reader. He also owns a record label and store, Magaza, in the centre of Sarajevo, in Baščaršija.

== Philanthropy ==
Dino is an active donor to scholarships for underprivileged children in Bosnia and Herzegovina. He is a long-time member of the Hastor Foundation, the biggest organization devoted to distributing scholarships to students in the country. He sponsors over a dozen students each year and has been a member of this program since 2008.

Dino worked for five years pro bono as the honorary and de facto president of the assembly of AMUS, the main association of music artists of Bosnia and Herzegovina. He was one of the founding members of the organization in 2013. In early 2018, he resigned from his position due to the lack of time to do the work.

Dino has played numerous charity concerts. During the 2014 Southeast Europe floods, his team was heavily involved in humanitarian work, distributing water, food, blankets and other provisions to the most endangered parts of Bosnia and Serbia.

In 2013, Dino was awarded the International Humanitarian Award in Urfa, Turkey.

== Discography ==
=== Merlin ===
==== Studio albums ====
- Kokuzna vremena (1985)
- Teško meni sa tobom (a još teže bez tebe) (1986)
- Merlin (1987)
- Nešto lijepo treba da se desi (1989)
- Peta strana svijeta (1990)

=== Solo ===
==== Studio albums ====
- Moja bogda sna (1993)
- Fotografija (1995)
- Sredinom (2000)
- Burek (2004)
- Ispočetka (2008)
- Hotel Nacional (2014)
- Mi (2025)

==== Compilations ====
- Balade (1995)
- Najljepše pjesme (1995)
- The Rest of the Best (1998)
- The Best of Dino Merlin (2001)
- The Ultimate Collection (2009)
- Greatest Hits Collection (2016)

==== DVDs ====
- Live Koševo 2004 (2005)
- Live Koševo 2008 (2009)
- Beograd 2011 (2016)
- Hotel Nacional - Koševo 2015 (2016)

==== Blu-rays ====
- Arena Zagreb (2018)
- Arena Pula (2020)

==== Other formats ====
- Live Vječna vatra (1999; CD/VHS release)
- Sredinom - Live Koševo 31.7.2000. (VHS release)
- Mir svim dobrim ljudima Show MMXX/MMXXI (2021, digital release only)

=== Singles ===
- 1989: "Kad zamirišu jorgovani" (with Vesna Zmijanac)
- 1997: "Zaspao je mjesec" (recorded around 1989 or 1990, intended to be released on "Peta strana svijeta")
- 1999: "Putnici" (featuring Béatrice Poulot)
- 1999: "Smijehom strah pokrijem"
- 2000: "Godinama" (featuring Ivana Banfić)
- 2000: "Umri prije smrti"
- 2000: "Moj je život Švicarska"
- 2000: "Sam" (featuring Adi Lukovac)
- 2004: "Burek"
- 2004: "Ti si mene" (featuring Nina Badrić)
- 2004: "Verletzt" (featuring Edo Zanki)
- 2004: "Supermen" (featuring Željko Joksimović)
- 2004: "Ako nastaviš ovako"
- 2007: "Otkrit ću ti tajnu"
- 2008: "Ispočetka"
- 2008: "Dabogda" (featuring Hajrudin Varešanović)
- 2008: "Deset mlađa"
- 2008: "Individualizam"
- 2008: "Nedostaješ"
- 2008: "Da šutiš" (featuring Eldin Huseinbegović)
- 2011: "Love in Rewind"
- 2011: "Undo"
- 2014: "Ruža" (featuring Hüsnü Şenlendirici)
- 2014: "Školjka"
- 2014: "Sve do medalje"
- 2014: "Sunce"
- 2015: "Rane"
- 2015: "Sve dok te bude imalo"
- 2020: "Mi"
- 2020: "Dođi" (featuring Senidah)
- 2021: "Jedan dan, jedna noć"
- 2022: "Krive karte"
- 2022: "Kako da ti kažem"
- 2023: "Skoro će zima"
- 2023: "Ne radujemo se" (featuring Marko Louis)
- 2025: "Briga"

=== Collaborations ===
- 2000: "I have no cannons that roar" (featuring Yusuf Islam)
- 2001: "Tako prazan" (featuring Adi Lukovac)
- 2002: "Pustite me" (featuring Osman Hadžić)
- 2006: "Kao moja mati" (featuring Zdravko Čolić)
- 2008: "Med" (featuring Emina Jahović)

== Tours ==
- Kokuzna vremena - Yugoslavian Tour (1985–1986)
- Teško meni sa tobom - Yugoslavian Tour (1986–1987)
- Nešto lijepo treba da se desi - European Tour (1988–1989)
- Fotografija - Balkan Tour (1997–1998)
- Sredinom - World Tour (2000–2003)
- Burek - World Tour (2004–2007)
- Ispočetka - World Tour (2008–11)
- Hotel Nacional - World Tour (2014–2019)
- Mi - World Tour (2022–present)

Preceded by Alma Čardžić with "Goodbye"	Bosnia and Herzegovina in the Eurovision Song Contest (with Béatrice Poulot); 1999	Succeeded by Nino Pršeš with "Hano"
Preceded by Vukašin Brajić with "Thunder and Lightning"	Bosnia and Herzegovina in the Eurovision Song Contest; 2011	Succeeded by Maya Sar with "Korake ti znam"
