= Moja bogda sna =

Studio album by Dino Merlin
- Released: 8 December 1993

Dino Merlin chronology
Moja bogda sna (1993)	Fotografija (1995)

Moja bogda sna is the debut solo studio album of the Bosnian singer Dino Merlin, after five albums with his band Merlin. It was released on 8 December 1993.

== Track listing ==
1993 cassette edition
No.	Title	Writer(s)	Producer(s)	Length
1.	"Moja bogda sna"	Dino Merlin	Dino Merlin, Vedran Ostojić
2.	"Prokletog me Bog stvorio"	Dino Merlin	Dino Merlin, Vedran Ostojić
3.	"Šta će mi sad ljubav?"	Dino Merlin	Dino Merlin
4.	"Ti i ja (Sarajevski veliki park)"	Zlatko Arslanagić	Dino Merlin
5.	"Ako me ikada sretneš"	Dino Merlin	Dino Merlin, Vedran Ostojić
6.	"Da se kući vratim"	Dino Merlin	Dino Merlin, Vedran Ostojić
7.	"Ostat' će istine dvije (kao nikada prije)"	Dino Merlin, Prince Rogers Nelson	Dino Merlin
8.	"Zaboravi"	Dino Merlin, Sezen Aksu	Dino Merlin
9.	"Poljubih te sinoć"	Dino Merlin	Vedran Ostojić

2009 CD reissue
No.	Title	Writer(s)	Producer(s)	Length
10.	"Vojnik sreće"	Dino Merlin	Dino Merlin
11.	"Mostarska"
12.	"Tamo gdje je sunce"
13.	"Jedna si jedina"

Notes

- "Ostat' će istine dvije (kao nikada prije)" contains an interpolaton of "When Doves Cry" (1984), written and performed by Prince.
- "Zaboravi" contains an interpolaton of "Değer Mi?" (1986), composed by Onno Tunç and penned by Aysel Gürel, as performed by Sezen Aksu.
- "Vojnik sreće" contains an interpolation of "I've Been Thinking About You" (1990), performed by Londonbeat.
