= Velija Bećirspahić =

Bosnia and Herzegovina footballer and coach

Personal information
- Full name: Velija Bećirspahić
- Date of birth: 1 January 1943
- Place of birth: Sarajevo, Independent State of Croatia
- Date of death: 1987
- Place of death: Sarajevo
- Positions: Leftback; winger

Youth career
- Pofalićki

Senior career*
Years	Team	Apps	(Gls)
1967–1974	Željezničar	191	(9)
1975	Jedinstvo		
- * Club domestic league appearances and goals

Velija "Dedo" Bećirspahić (1943-1987) was a Bosnian football player and a coach. Widely known by his nickname Dedo (grandpa) due to early hair hoariness, he spent his entire professional career with FK Željezničar.

== Club career ==
He started his career in FK Pofalićki, a small club from Sarajevo. He was spotted there by coaches of Željezničar Sarajevo and in 1967 signed a contract with the club in which he would spend the rest of his career. At first, this left-footed player was a winger, but later he was moved to defence. He would become one of the most recognizable left backs in Yugoslav First League with a hard-nosed, old school attitude - "ball can get through, but not the player".

He played 222 matches in all competitions for Željezničar, scoring 12 goals. He was a member of the team that won Yugoslav championship in 1971–72 season. He retired in 1975.

== Managerial career ==
After that, he became a coach of FK Željezničar youth squad. In 1978, Ivica Osim selected him to be one of his assistant coaches in FK Željezničar.

== Personal life ==
He suffered from and then died of cancer.
