= Sredinom =

Studio album by Dino Merlin
- Released: 16 July 2000
- Recorded: 1999–2000
- Genre: Pop; World music
- Label: Magaza
- Producer: Dino Merlin

Dino Merlin chronology
Vječna vatra (1999)	Sredinom (2000)	Burek (2004)

Sredinom (trans. Through the middle) is the third solo studio album of Bosnian musician Dino Merlin, released on 16 July 2000 through his private record label, Magaza. Considered to be one of Dino Merlin's best works to date, as well as helping establish Dino Merlin as one of the most prominent singers-songwriters in the region, Sredinom is one of the most commercially successful albums ever to be released in Southeast Europe, with an estimated two million copies having been sold.

== Track listing ==
No.	Title	Writer(s)	Producer(s)	Length
1.	"Halima"	Dino Merlin	Dino Merlin
2.	"Godinama"	Dino Merlin	Dino Merlin, Enes Tvrtković
3.	"Umri prije smrti"	Dino Merlin	Dino Merlin, Enes Tvrtković
4.	"Baška ti"	Dino Merlin	Dino Merlin
5.	"Moj je život Švicarska"	Dino Merlin	Dino Merlin, Enes Tvrtković
6.	"Kremen"	Tarik Kelifa, Dino Merlin	Dino Merlin, Enes Tvrtković
7.	"Sredinom"	Dino Merlin	Dino Merlin, Adi Lukovac
8.	"Esma"	Dino Merlin	Dino Merlin, Adi Lukovac, Brano Jakubović, Vedran Mujagić, Adnan Zilić
9.	"Sve je laž"	Dino Merlin	Dino Merlin
10.	"Hitna"	Dino Merlin	Dino Merlin
11.	"Sam"	Dino Merlin	Dino Merlin, Adi Lukovac, Brano Jakubović, Vedran Mujagić, Adnan Zilić
12.	"Kad si rekla da me voliš"	Emerson Hart, Dino Merlin	Dino Merlin
13.	"Da je tuga snijeg"	Sezen Aksu, Dino Merlin	Dino Merlin, Almir Buza
14.	"Putnici"	Dino Merlin	Dino Merlin, Srđan Kurpjel
