= Burek (album) =

Studio album by Dino Merlin
- Released: June 5, 2004
- Recorded: 2003–2004
- Genre: Pop, folk-pop
- Label: Grand Production
- Producer: Dino Merlin (executive), Dino Merlin

Dino Merlin chronology
Sredinom (2000)	Burek (2004)	Live Koševo 2004 (2005)

Burek is the fourth solo studio album by Bosnian musician Dino Merlin, released on 5 June 2004 through Grand Production. Three songs were featured as singles: "Burek", "Supermen" and "Ako Nastaviš Ovako". This album includes 15 tracks, many of which are new. The song "Supermen" is sung by Dino Merlin with a guest appearance by Željko Joksimović. Many of the songs on this album have also appeared on his Live Koševo 2004 album released in 2005. The other guest appearances on the Burek album include Nina Badrić on "Ti si mene", and Edo Zanki on "Verletzt".

== Track listing ==
No.	Title	Writer(s)	Producer(s)	Length
1.	"Burek"	Dino Merlin	Dino Merlin, Srđan Kurpjel
2.	"Zid"	Eman Bulbulušić	Eman Bulbulušić, Mahir Sarihodžić, Mahir Beathouse
3.	"Želja"	Eman Bulbulušić	Dino Merlin, Mahir Sarihodžić, Zvonimir Dusper, Dino Šukalo
4.	"Majka ruži kćer"	Dino Merlin	Dino Merlin, Almir Buza
5.	"Verletzt (feat. Edo Zanki)"	Dino Merlin, Edo Zanki	Dino Merlin, Vilko Zanki
6.	"Ti si mene feat. Nina Badrić"	Dino Merlin	Dino Merlin, Enes Tvrtković
7.	"Subota"	Eldar Mansurov, Dino Merlin	Dino Merlin, Srđan Kurpjel
8.	"Sarajevo"	Dino Merlin	Dino Merlin, Srđan Kurpjel
9.	"Kad čovjek voli ženu"	Dino Merlin	Dino Merlin, Zvonimir Dusper, Dino Šukalo, Amar Češljar
10.	"Supermen feat. Željko Joksimović"	Željko Joksimović, Dino Merlin	Dino Merlin, Željko Joksimović
11.	"Bijelo"	Kazantzis Yorgos, Dino Merlin	Dino Merlin, Enes Tvrtković
12.	"Mišići"	Dino Merlin	Dino Merlin, Mahir Beathouse, Dino Šukalo, Amar Češljar
13.	"Svila"	Dino Merlin	Dino Merlin, Mahir Beathouse, Dino Šukalo
14.	"Ako nastaviš ovako"	Dino Merlin	Dino Merlin, Steve Wellington
15.	"Na Vi"	Arjinder Sing Kang, Dino Merlin	Dino Merlin, Mahir Sarihodžić, Dino Šukalo
