= Brano Likić =

Brano Likić (born 23 January 1954, in Sarajevo, Bosnia and Herzegovina, Yugoslavia) is a composer, producer, and performer.

== Musical career ==
He founded the band Rezonansa. Likić's studio, BLAP, was the place where most of the music from Sarajevo in the 1980s and 1990s was recorded. With the group Rezonansa he released six albums, while he released twenty of his own albums. Also worth mentioning is his work with the group Formula 4 and the group Baglama band! As a producer, Brano has produced more than 500 albums.

== See also ==
- Music of Bosnia and Herzegovina
