= 2006–07 FK Sarajevo season =

Sarajevo
2006–07 season
- Sporting director: Senad Merdanović
- Chairman: Hajrudin Šuman
- Manager: Husref Musemić
- Stadium: Asim Ferhatović Hase Stadium
- Premier League BiH: Winners
- Cup of BiH: Semi-finals
- UEFA Cup: Second qualifying round
- Top goalscorer: League: Emir Obuća (6); All: Emir Obuća (13)
- Highest home attendance: 20,000 vs Radnik (23 May 2007)
- Lowest home attendance: 1,500 vs Slavija (4 November 2006); 1,500 vs Modriča Maxima (5 May 2007)
- Average home league attendance: 5,433
- Biggest win: Sarajevo 5–0 Radnik (23 May 2007)
- Biggest defeat: Leotar 4–0 Sarajevo (19 May 2007)

The 2006–07 Sarajevo season was the club's 58th season in history, and their 13th consecutive season in the top flight of Bosnian football, the Premier League of BiH. Besides competing in the Premier League, the team competed in the National Cup and the qualifications for UEFA Cup.

== Squad information ==
=== First-team squad ===
Note: Flags indicate national team as defined under FIFA eligibility rules; some limited exceptions apply. Players may hold more than one non-FIFA nationality.

No.	Pos.	Nation	Player
1	GK	BIH	Irfan Fejzić
2	DF	BIH	Semjon Milošević
3	MF	BIH	Damir Hadžić
4	MF	BIH	Ajdin Maksumić
4	MF	BIH	Muamer Kurto
5	DF	BIH	Muhidin Zukić
6	DF	BIH	Vule Trivunović
6	DF	BIH	Nihad Suljević
7	MF	BIH	Faruk Ihtijarević (C)
8	MF	BIH	Veldin Muharemović
9	FW	BIH	Emir Obuća
10	FW	BIH	Admir Hasančić
10	MF	BIH	Arben Avdija
11	MF	BIH	Senad Repuh (captain)
14	MF	BIH	Muhamed Džakmić

No.	Pos.	Nation	Player
16	MF	BRA	Marciano José do Nascimento
17	MF	BIH	Miloš Babić
17	FW	BIH	Samir Šarić
18	MF	BIH	Samir Duro
18	DF	BIH	Anel Škoro
18	FW	BIH	Edin Šaranović
19	MF	BIH	Eldar Mašić
19	FW	BIH	Almir Turković
20	DF	BIH	Zdravko Šaraba
21	MF	BIH	Vladan Grujić
21	MF	BIH	Sead Bučan
22	GK	BIH	Muhamed Alaim (vice-captain)
23	DF	BIH	Marinko Mačkić
2 23	FW	BIH	Almir Pliska
32	MF	BIH	Adis Kapetanović
—	MF	BIH	Adin Ferhatović

=== Out on loan ===
No.	Pos.	Nation	Player
—	MF	BIH	Emir Janjoš (at (Bosnia and Herzegovina) Olimpik)

== Kit ==
Supplier	Sponsors	
(Italy) Legea	(Bosnia and Herzegovina) Code	Front
(Italy) Legea	(Bosnia and Herzegovina) Bosnalijek	Back

== Competitions ==
=== Overview ===
Competition	First match	Last match	Starting round	Final position	Record							
Competition	First match	Last match	Starting round	Final position	Pld	W	D	L	GF	GA	GD	Win %
Premier League	5 August 2006	23 May 2007	Matchday 1	Winners	30	17	6	7	44	26	+18	56.67
Cup of BiH	20 September 2006	25 April 2007	First round	Semi-finals	7	3	3	1	13	9	+4	42.86
UEFA Cup	13 July 2006	24 August 2006	First qualifying round	Second qualifying round	4	3	0	1	6	2	+4	75.00
Total					41	23	9	9	63	37	+26	56.10

Source: Competitions

=== Premier League ===
==== League table ====
Pos	Team	Pld	W	D	L	GF	GA	GD	Pts	Qualification or relegation
1	Sarajevo (C)	30	17	6	7	44	26	+18	57	Qualification to Champions League first qualifying round
2	Zrinjski (Note: Zrinjski Mostar 1 point deducted for leaving the field in Round 23 match against Orašje.)	30	17	4	9	69	40	+29	54	Qualification to UEFA Cup first qualifying round
3	Slavija	30	17	2	11	41	35	+6	53	Qualification to Intertoto Cup first round
4	Široki Brijeg	30	13	6	11	39	32	+7	45	Qualification to UEFA Cup first qualifying round (Note: Široki Brijeg won 2006–07 Bosnian Cup and qualified for the first qualifying round of the UEFA Cup.)
5	Modriča	30	13	5	12	43	42	+1	44	

Source: RSSSF.org
Rules for classification: 1) points; 2) goal difference; 3) number of goals scored.
(C) Champions

==== Results summary ====
Overall								Home						Away					
Pld	W	D	L	GF	GA	GD	Pts	W	D	L	GF	GA	GD	W	D	L	GF	GA	GD
30	17	6	7	44	26	+18	57	14	1	0	33	6	+27	3	5	7	11	20	−9

Source: Sportsport.ba

==== Results by round ====
Round	1	2	3	4	5	6	7	8	9	10	11	12	13	14	15	16	17	18	19	20	21	22	23	24	25	26	27	28	29	30
Ground	H	H	A	H	A	H	A	H	A	H	A	H	A	H	A	A	A	H	A	H	A	H	A	H	A	H	A	H	A	H
Result	W	W	W	D	D	W	W	W	W	W	L	W	L	W	L	D	D	W	L	W	L	W	L	W	D	W	D	W	L	W
Position	2	1	1	1	2	2	1	1	1	1	1	1	1	1	1	1	1	1	1	1	1	1	1	1	1	1	1	1	1	1

Source: Competitions
A = Away; H = Home; W = Win; D = Draw; L = Loss

==== Matches ====
5 August 2006 1	Sarajevo	2–0	Jedinstvo	Sarajevo
	Maksumić 58', 84'	Report		Stadium: Asim Ferhatović Hase Stadium; Attendance: 2,000

13 August 2006 2	Sarajevo	1–0	Zrinjski	Sarajevo
		Report		Stadium: Asim Ferhatović Hase Stadium; Attendance: 2,500

19 August 2006 3	Žepče Limorad	2–3	Sarajevo	Žepče
	Džidić 55', 78'	Report	Maksumić 15'; Mačkić 25'; Duro 53'	Stadium: Žepče City Stadium; Attendance: 1,500

27 August 2006 4	Sarajevo	1–1	Sloboda	Sarajevo
		Report		Stadium: Asim Ferhatović Hase Stadium; Attendance: 6,000

10 September 2006 5	Čelik	0–0	Sarajevo	Zenica
		Report		Stadium: Bilino Polje Stadium; Attendance: 13,000

16 September 2006 6	Sarajevo	3–1	Borac	Sarajevo
	Turković 7'; Obuća 21', 34'	Report	Benić 70'	Stadium: Asim Ferhatović Hase Stadium; Attendance: 2,000

23 September 2006 7	Orašje	0–1	Sarajevo	Orašje
		Report	Obuća 36'	Stadium: Orašje City Stadium; Attendance: 1,300

30 September 2006 8	Sarajevo	2–1	Posušje	Sarajevo
	Repuh 9'; Duro 29'	Report	Mešić 51'	Stadium: Asim Ferhatović Hase Stadium; Attendance: 4,000

14 October 2006 9	Željezničar	0–1	Sarajevo	Sarajevo
		Report	Turković 81'	Stadium: Grbavica Stadium; Attendance: 9,000

21 October 2006 10	Sarajevo	2–1	Velež	Sarajevo
	Duro 12' (pen.); Turković 22'	Report	Velagić 17'	Stadium: Asim Ferhatović Hase Stadium; Attendance: 7,000

28 October 2006 11	Modriča Maxima	3–1	Sarajevo	Modriča
		Report		Stadium: Modriča City Stadium; Attendance: 2,000

4 November 2006 12	Sarajevo	1–0	Slavija	Sarajevo
		Report		Stadium: Asim Ferhatović Hase Stadium; Attendance: 1,500

12 November 2006 13	Široki Brijeg	1–0	Sarajevo	Široki Brijeg
		Report		Stadium: Pecara Stadium; Attendance: 1,500

19 November 2006 14	Sarajevo	1–0	Leotar	Sarajevo
	Bučan 11'	Report		Stadium: Asim Ferhatović Hase Stadium; Attendance: 2,000

25 November 2006 15	Radnik	1–0	Sarajevo	Bijeljina
		Report		Stadium: Bijeljina City Stadium; Attendance: 1,000

3 March 2007 16	Jedinstvo	1–1	Sarajevo	Bihać
		Report		Stadium: Pod Borićima Stadium; Attendance: 5,500

11 March 2007 17	Zrinjski	1–1	Sarajevo	Mostar
	Džidić 12'	Report	Marciano 76' (pen.)	Stadium: Stadion pod Bijelim Brijegom; Attendance: 6,500

14 March 2007 18	Sarajevo	2–0	Žepče Limorad	Sarajevo
		Report		Stadium: Asim Ferhatović Hase Stadium; Attendance: 5,500

17 March 2007 19	Sloboda	1–0	Sarajevo	Tuzla
		Report		Stadium: Tušanj Stadium; Attendance: 6,000

31 March 2007 20	Sarajevo	3–1	Čelik	Sarajevo
	Obuća 44'; Šaraba 62'; Šaranović 65'	Report	Zatagić 75'	Stadium: Asim Ferhatović Hase Stadium; Attendance: 3,000

7 April 2007 21	Borac	2–1	Sarajevo	Banja Luka
	Benić 2'; Žarić 90+2' (pen.)	Report	Zukić 84'	Stadium: Banja Luka City Stadium; Attendance: 8,000

11 April 2007 22	Sarajevo	2–0	Orašje	Sarajevo
	Šaranović 16'; Kurto 80'	Report		Stadium: Asim Ferhatović Hase Stadium; Attendance: 2,500

18 April 2007 23	Posušje	2–0	Sarajevo	Posušje
		Report		Stadium: Mokri Dolac Stadium; Attendance: 2,000

21 April 2007 24	Sarajevo	2–1	Željezničar	Sarajevo
	Turković 20'; Kurto 83'	Report	Dialiba 6'	Stadium: Asim Ferhatović Hase Stadium; Attendance: 17,000

28 April 2007 25	Velež	1–1	Sarajevo	Mostar
	Serdarević 85'	Report	Marciano 90' (pen.)	Stadium: Vrapčići Stadium; Attendance: 0

5 May 2007 26	Sarajevo	4–0	Modriča Maxima	Sarajevo
	Ihtijarević 32'; Repuh; Marciano (pen.); Muharemović	Report		Stadium: Asim Ferhatović Hase Stadium; Attendance: 1,500

12 May 2007 27	Slavija	1–1	Sarajevo	Istočno Sarajevo
	Stanković 7'	Report	Obuća 87'	Stadium: City Stadium SRC Slavija; Attendance: 6,000

16 May 2007 28	Sarajevo	2–0	Široki Brijeg	Sarajevo
		Report		Stadium: Asim Ferhatović Hase Stadium; Attendance: 5,000

19 May 2007 29	Leotar	4–0	Sarajevo	Trebinje
		Report		Stadium: Police Stadium; Attendance: 1,500

23 May 2007 30	Sarajevo	5–0	Radnik	Sarajevo
	Ihtijarević 27'; Šaranović 50', 65'; Grujić 63', 70'	Report		Stadium: Asim Ferhatović Hase Stadium; Attendance: 20,000

=== Cup of Bosnia and Herzegovina ===
==== Round of 32 ====
20 September 2006	Drina Zvornik	1–2	Sarajevo	Zvornik
	Marković 33'	Report	Repuh 70'; Obuća 90'	Stadium: Zvornik City Stadium; Attendance: 1,200

==== Round of 16 ====
18 October 2006 First leg	Posušje	3–3	Sarajevo	Posušje
	Stojanović 47'; Vranjković 83'; Milošević 90+2'	Report	Duro 11', 26' (pen.), 39'	Stadium: Mokri Dolac Stadium; Attendance: 300

25 October 2006 Second leg	Sarajevo	3–0 (6–3 agg.)	Posušje	Sarajevo
		Report		Stadium: Asim Ferhatović Hase Stadium; Attendance: 2,000

==== Quarter-finals ====
8 November 2006 First leg	Željezničar	0–0	Sarajevo	Sarajevo
		Report		Stadium: Grbavica Stadium; Attendance: 5,500

22 November 2006 Second leg	Sarajevo	3–2 (3–2 agg.)	Željezničar	Sarajevo
	Vladavić 22'; Štilić 90'	Report	Trivunović 45'; Obuća 55'; Repuh 60'	Stadium: Asim Ferhatović Hase Stadium; Attendance: 5,000

==== Semi-finals ====
11 April 2007 First leg	Sarajevo	1–1	Slavija	Sarajevo
		Report		Stadium: Asim Ferhatović Hase Stadium; Attendance: 4,000

25 April 2007 Second leg	Slavija	2–1 (3–2 agg.)	Sarajevo	Istočno Sarajevo
		Report		Stadium: City Stadium SRC Slavija; Attendance: 4,500

=== UEFA Cup ===
==== First qualifying round ====
13 July 2006 First leg	Sarajevo (Bosnia and Herzegovina)	3–0	(Andorra) Rànger's	Sarajevo, Bosnia and Herzegovina
18:00 CEST (UTC+2)	Obuća 20', 30'; Duro 45'	Report		Stadium: Asim Ferhatović Hase Stadium; Attendance: 2,023; Referee: Richard Havrilla (Slovakia)

27 July 2006 Second leg	Rànger's (Andorra)	0–2 (0–5 agg.)	(Bosnia and Herzegovina) Sarajevo	Andorra la Vella, Andorra
18:00 CEST (UTC+2)		Report	Hadžić 10'; Obuća 45'	Stadium: Estadi Comunal d'Andorra la Vella; Attendance: 200; Referee: Stefano Podeschi (Italy)

==== Second qualifying round ====
10 August 2006 First leg	Sarajevo (Bosnia and Herzegovina)	1–0	(Romania) Rapid București	Sarajevo, Bosnia and Herzegovina
20:00 CEST (UTC+2)	Obuća 90+2'	Report		Stadium: Asim Ferhatović Hase Stadium; Attendance: 8,000; Referee: Duarte Gomes (Portugal)

24 August 2006 Second leg	Rapid București (Romania)	2–0 (2–1 agg.)	(Bosnia and Herzegovina) Sarajevo	Bucharest, Romania
19:30 EEST (UTC+3)	Buga 39'; Moldovan 90+1'	Report		Stadium: Stadionul Giulești-Valentin Stănescu; Attendance: 6,700; Referee: Joeri Van De Velde (Belgium)

== Statistics ==
Appearances

Rank	Player	Games
1	Faruk Ihtijarević	38
2	Muhamed Alaim	37
3	Damir Hadžić	37
4	Emir Obuća	36
5	Senad Repuh	35
6	Veldin Muharemović	33

Goalscorers

Rank	Player	Goals
1	Emir Obuća	13
2	Samir Duro	10
3	Ajdin Maksumić	6
4	Edin Šaranović	5
5	Almir Turković	5
6	Senad Repuh	5
