= 2007–08 FK Sarajevo season =

Sarajevo
2007–08 season
- FK Sarajevo jersey, 2007-2008
- Sporting director: Senad Merdanović
- Chairman: Hajrudin Šuman
- Manager: Abdulah Oruč; Husref Musemić
- Stadium: Asim Ferhatović Hase Stadium
- Premier League BiH: 5th
- Cup of BiH: Quarter-finals
- UEFA Champions League: Third qualifying round
- UEFA Cup: First round
- Top goalscorer: League: Admir Raščić (7); All: Admir Raščić (11)
- Highest home attendance: 21,000 vs Genk (8 August 2007); 21,000 vs Dynamo Kyiv (15 August 2007)
- Lowest home attendance: 300 vs Jedinstvo (14 November 2007)
- Average home league attendance: 2,607
- Biggest win: Marsaxlokk 0–6 Sarajevo (18 July 2007)
- Biggest defeat: Basel 6–0 Sarajevo (4 October 2007)

The 2007–08 Sarajevo season was the club's 59th season in history, and their 14th consecutive season in the top flight of Bosnian football, the Premier League of BiH. Besides competing in the Premier League, the team competed in the National Cup, qualifications for UEFA Champions League and reached the First round of UEFA Cup.

== Squad information ==
=== First-team squad ===
Note: Flags indicate national team as defined under FIFA eligibility rules; some limited exceptions apply. Players may hold more than one non-FIFA nationality.

No.	Pos.	Nation	Player
1	GK	BIH	Irfan Fejzić
2	DF	BIH	Semjon Milošević
3	MF	BIH	Damir Hadžić
4	MF	BIH	Muamer Kurto
5	DF	BIH	Muhidin Zukić
6	DF	BIH	Nihad Suljević
7	FW	BIH	Haris Handžić
7	MF	BIH	Faruk Ihtijarević
8	MF	BIH	Veldin Muharemović
9	FW	BIH	Emir Obuća
10 8 4	DF	BIH	Alen Bašić
11	MF	BIH	Senad Repuh
12	GK	BIH	Dino Hamzić
13	MF	BIH	Marko Maksimović
14	MF	BIH	Muhamed Džakmić
15	MF	BIH	Vladan Grujić
16	FW	BIH	Mirza Mešić

No.	Pos.	Nation	Player
17	MF	BIH	Miloš Babić
17	DF	BIH	Ninoslav Milenković
18	DF	BIH	Anel Škoro
18	MF	BIH	Samir Duro
19	FW	BIH	Almir Turković
20	DF	BIH	Elvis Sadiković
20	DF	BIH	Zdravko Šaraba
21	MF	BIH	Sead Bučan
22	GK	BIH	Muhamed Alaim (captain)
23	FW	BIH	Almir Pliska
24	FW	BIH	Admir Raščić
25	MF	BIH	Bojan Magazin
32	MF	BIH	Adis Kapetanović
33	MF	BIH	Emir Janjoš
—	FW	BIH	Duško Stajić
—	MF	BIH	Muhamed Mirvić

== Kit ==
Supplier	Sponsors	
(Italy) Legea (2007) (United States) Nike (2008)	(Bosnia and Herzegovina) AurA	Front
(Italy) Legea (2007) (United States) Nike (2008)	(Bosnia and Herzegovina) BH Pošta	Sleeve

== Competitions ==
=== Overview ===
Competition	First match	Last match	Starting round	Final position	Record							
Competition	First match	Last match	Starting round	Final position	Pld	W	D	L	GF	GA	GD	Win %
Premier League	4 August 2007	31 May 2008	Matchday 1	5th	30	14	6	10	42	29	+13	46.67
Cup of BiH	24 October 2007	19 March 2008	First round	Quarter-finals	5	2	2	1	12	8	+4	40.00
UEFA Champions League	18 July 2007	29 August 2007	First qualifying round	Third qualifying round	6	3	0	3	11	7	+4	50.00
UEFA Cup	20 September 2007	4 October 2007	First round	First round	2	0	0	2	1	8	−7	0.00
Total					43	19	8	16	66	52	+14	44.19

Source: Competitions

=== Premier League ===
==== League table ====
Pos	Team	Pld	W	D	L	GF	GA	GD	Pts	Qualification or relegation
3	Čelik Zenica	30	16	4	10	38	32	+6	52	Qualification to Intertoto Cup first round
4	Zrinjski	30	15	4	11	46	27	+19	49	Qualification to UEFA Cup first qualifying round (Note: Zrinjski won 2007–08 Bosnian Cup and qualified for the first qualifying round of the UEFA Cup.)
5	Sarajevo	30	14	6	10	42	29	+13	48	
6	Sloboda Tuzla	30	15	2	13	44	38	+6	47	
7	Željezničar	30	14	3	13	47	35	+12	45	

Source: RSSSF.org
Rules for classification: 1) points; 2) goal difference; 3) number of goals scored.

==== Results summary ====
Overall								Home						Away					
Pld	W	D	L	GF	GA	GD	Pts	W	D	L	GF	GA	GD	W	D	L	GF	GA	GD
30	14	6	10	42	29	+13	48	11	3	1	32	10	+22	3	3	9	10	19	−9

Source: Sportsport.ba

==== Results by round ====
Round	1	2	3	4	5	6	7	8	9	10	11	12	13	14	15	16	17	18	19	20	21	22	23	24	25	26	27	28	29	30
Ground	H	H	A	H	A	H	A	H	A	H	A	H	A	H	A	A	A	H	A	H	A	H	A	H	A	H	A	H	A	H
Result	W	L	D	D	L	D	D	W	D	W	L	W	W	W	L	L	W	W	L	W	L	W	W	D	L	W	L	W	L	W
Position	1	5	7	10	13	13	13	11	10	6	11	8	6	5	5	8	6	4	6	5	7	5	5	5	7	5	7	5	7	5

Source: Competitions
A = Away; H = Home; W = Win; D = Draw; L = Loss

==== Matches ====
4 August 2007 1	Sarajevo	4–1	Orašje	Sarajevo
		Report		Stadium: Asim Ferhatović Hase Stadium; Attendance: 5,000

18 August 2007 3	Velež	2–2	Sarajevo	Mostar
		Report		Stadium: Vrapčići Stadium; Attendance: 6,000

25 August 2007 4	Sarajevo	1–1	Slavija	Sarajevo
		Report		Stadium: Asim Ferhatović Hase Stadium; Attendance: 1,500

2 September 2007 5	Travnik	1–0	Sarajevo	Travnik
		Report		Stadium: Pirota Stadium; Attendance: 2,500

15 September 2007 6	Sarajevo	2–2	Široki Brijeg	Sarajevo
		Report		Stadium: Asim Ferhatović Hase Stadium; Attendance: 2,500

23 September 2007 7	Posušje	0–0	Sarajevo	Posušje
		Report		Stadium: Mokri Dolac Stadium; Attendance: 1,800

26 September 2007 2	Sarajevo	2–4	Modriča Maxima	Sarajevo
		Report		Stadium: Asim Ferhatović Hase Stadium; Attendance: 1,000

29 September 2007 8	Sarajevo	3–0	Žepče Limorad	Sarajevo
		Report		Stadium: Asim Ferhatović Hase Stadium; Attendance: 1,000

7 October 2007 9	Željezničar	0–0	Sarajevo	Sarajevo
		Report		Stadium: Grbavica Stadium; Attendance: 10,000

20 October 2007 10	Sarajevo	3–0	Leotar	Sarajevo
		Report		Stadium: Asim Ferhatović Hase Stadium; Attendance: 1,000

28 October 2007 11	Zrinjski	4–0	Sarajevo	Mostar
		Report		Stadium: Bijeli Brijeg Stadium; Attendance: 1,000

3 November 2007 12	Sarajevo	2–1	Sloboda	Sarajevo
		Report		Stadium: Asim Ferhatović Hase Stadium; Attendance: 1,000

10 November 2007 13	Laktaši	1–3	Sarajevo	Laktaši
		Report		Stadium: Laktaši City Stadium; Attendance: 2,000

14 November 2007 14	Sarajevo	4–0	Jedinstvo	Sarajevo
		Report		Stadium: Asim Ferhatović Hase Stadium; Attendance: 300

24 November 2007 15	Čelik	1–0	Sarajevo	Zenica
		Report		Stadium: Bilino Polje Stadium; Attendance: 10,000

1 March 2008 16	Orašje	3–1	Sarajevo	Orašje
		Report		Stadium: Orašje City Stadium; Attendance: 800

9 March 2008 17	Modriča Maxima	0–1	Sarajevo	Modriča
		Report		Stadium: Maxima Stadium; Attendance: 2,000

15 March 2008 18	Sarajevo	1–0	Velež	Sarajevo
		Report		Stadium: Asim Ferhatović Hase Stadium; Attendance: 3,500

22 March 2008 19	Slavija	1–0	Sarajevo	Istočno Sarajevo
		Report		Stadium: City Stadium SRC Slavija; Attendance: 3,500

29 March 2008 20	Sarajevo	1–0	Travnik	Sarajevo
		Report		Stadium: Asim Ferhatović Hase Stadium; Attendance: 1,500

2 April 2008 21	Široki Brijeg	1–0	Sarajevo	Široki Brijeg
		Report		Stadium: Pecara Stadium; Attendance: 1,500

5 April 2008 22	Sarajevo	3–1	Posušje	Sarajevo
		Report		Stadium: Asim Ferhatović Hase Stadium; Attendance: 800

13 April 2008 23	Žepče Limorad	1–3	Sarajevo	Žepče
		Report		Stadium: Žepče City Stadium; Attendance: 1,000

19 April 2008 24	Sarajevo	0–0	Željezničar	Sarajevo
		Report		Stadium: Asim Ferhatović Hase Stadium; Attendance: 8,000

26 April 2008 25	Leotar	2–0	Sarajevo	Trebinje
		Report		Stadium: Police Stadium; Attendance: 1,300

4 May 2008 26	Sarajevo	1–0	Zrinjski	Sarajevo
		Report		Stadium: Asim Ferhatović Hase Stadium; Attendance: 3,000

10 May 2008 27	Sloboda	1–0	Sarajevo	Tuzla
		Report		Stadium: Tušanj City Stadium; Attendance: 4,000

17 May 2008 28	Sarajevo	2–0	Laktaši	Sarajevo
		Report		Stadium: Asim Ferhatović Hase Stadium; Attendance: 3,000

24 May 2008 29	Jedinstvo	1–0	Sarajevo	Bihać
		Report		Stadium: Pod Borićima Stadium; Attendance: 2,000

31 May 2008 30	Sarajevo	3–0	Čelik	Sarajevo
		Report		Stadium: Asim Ferhatović Hase Stadium; Attendance: 6,000

=== Cup of Bosnia and Herzegovina ===
==== Round of 32 ====
24 October 2007	Radnik Hadžići	1–5	Sarajevo	Hadžići
14:00 CEST (UTC+2)		Report		Stadium: Hadžići City Stadium; Attendance: 1,500

==== Round of 16 ====
7 November 2007 First leg	Sarajevo	1–1	Velež	Sarajevo
13:00 CET (UTC+1)		Report		Stadium: Asim Ferhatović Hase Stadium; Attendance: 500

28 November 2007 Second leg	Velež	1–1 (2–2 agg.) (6–7 p)	Sarajevo	Mostar
12:30 CET (UTC+1)		Report		Stadium: Vrapčići Stadium; Attendance: 1,500

==== Quarter-finals ====
2008. First leg	FK Željezničar Sarajevo	Abandoned	FK Sarajevo	Sarajevo
				Stadium: Grbavica Stadium

12 March 2008 First leg	Željezničar	3–1	Sarajevo	Sarajevo
15:00 CET (UTC+1)		Report		Stadium: Grbavica Stadium; Attendance: 10,000

19 March 2008 Second leg	Sarajevo	4–2 (5–5 (a) agg.)	Željezničar	Sarajevo
16:00 CET (UTC+1)		Report		Stadium: Asim Ferhatović Hase Stadium; Attendance: 8,000

=== UEFA Champions League ===
==== First qualifying round ====
18 July 2007 First leg	Marsaxlokk (Malta)	0–6	(Bosnia and Herzegovina) Sarajevo	Ta' Qali, Malta
20:00 CEST (UTC+2)		Report	Raščić 5', 9'; Obuća 20', 65'; Maksimović 42'; Bučan 87'	Stadium: Ta' Qali National Stadium; Attendance: 321; Referee: Mario Vlk (Slovakia)

24 July 2007 Second leg	Sarajevo (Bosnia and Herzegovina)	3–1 (9–1 agg.)	(Malta) Marsaxlokk	Sarajevo, Bosnia and Herzegovina
20:00 CEST (UTC+2)	Mešić 42'; Šaraba 60'; Turković 76'	Report	Frendo 65'	Stadium: Asim Ferhatović Hase Stadium; Attendance: 5,000; Referee: Stanislav Todorov (Bulgaria)

==== Second qualifying round ====
31 July 2007 First leg	Genk (Belgium)	1–2	(Bosnia and Herzegovina) Sarajevo	Genk, Belgium
20:30 CEST (UTC+2)	Cornelis 28'	Report	Raščić 15'; Muharemović 86'	Stadium: Cristal Arena; Attendance: 11,090; Referee: Igor Egorov (Russia)

8 August 2007 Second leg	Sarajevo (Bosnia and Herzegovina)	0–1 (2 (a)–2 agg.)	(Belgium) Genk	Sarajevo, Bosnia and Herzegovina
19:30 CEST (UTC+2)		Report	Mikulić 58'	Stadium: Asim Ferhatović Hase Stadium; Attendance: 21,000; Referee: Alexandru Tudor (Romania)

==== Third qualifying round ====
15 August 2007 First leg	Sarajevo (Bosnia and Herzegovina)	0–1	(Ukraine) Dynamo Kyiv	Sarajevo, Bosnia and Herzegovina
20:00 CEST (UTC+2)		Report	Shatskikh 13'	Stadium: Asim Ferhatović Hase Stadium; Attendance: 21,000; Referee: Alon Yefet (Israel)

29 August 2007 Second leg	Dynamo Kyiv (Ukraine)	3–0 (4–0 agg.)	(Bosnia and Herzegovina) Sarajevo	Kyiv, Ukraine
19:00 EEST (UTC+3)	Bangoura 3'; Milošević 75' (o.g.); Rebrov 90+2' (pen.)	Report		Stadium: Valeriy Lobanovskyi Dynamo Stadium; Attendance: 16,100; Referee: Stuart Dougal (Scotland)

=== UEFA Cup ===
==== First round ====
20 September 2007 First leg	Sarajevo (Bosnia and Herzegovina)	1–2	(Switzerland) Basel	Sarajevo, Bosnia and Herzegovina
20:00 CEST (UTC+2)	Milošević 90+3'	Report	Carlitos 11'; Ergić 63'	Stadium: Asim Ferhatović Hase Stadium; Attendance: 4,000; Referee: Romāns Lajuks (Latvia)

4 October 2007 Second leg	Basel (Switzerland)	6–0 (8–1 agg.)	(Bosnia and Herzegovina) Sarajevo	Basel, Switzerland
19:30 CEST (UTC+2)	Carlitos 8', 9'; Streller 19', 29'; Huggel 75'; Caicedo 90+1'	Report	Bučan (yellow card) 21'; Kurto (yellow card) 66'	Stadium: St. Jakob-Park; Attendance: 15,124; Referee: Paulo Costa (Portugal)

== Statistics ==
Appearances

Rank	Player	Games
1.	Damir Hadžić	39
2.	Semjon Milošević	39
3.	Admir Raščić	37
4.	Almir Turković	36

Goalscorers

Rank	Player	Goals
1.	Admir Raščić	11
2.	Haris Handžić	9
3.	Almir Turković	7
4.	Damir Hadžić	7
