= 2008–09 FK Sarajevo season =

Sarajevo
2008–09 season
- Horde Zla in 2009
- Sporting director: Senad Merdanović
- Chairman: Hajrudin Šuman
- Manager: Šener Bajramović; Husnija Arapović; Mehmed Janjoš
- Stadium: Asim Ferhatović Hase Stadium
- Premier League BiH: 4th
- Cup of BiH: Round of 32
- Top goalscorer: League: Admir Raščić (9); All: Admir Raščić (9)
- Highest home attendance: 9,000 vs Željezničar (8 November 2008)
- Lowest home attendance: 1,500 (3 games)
- Average home league attendance: 3,000
- Biggest win: Sarajevo 6–1 Travnik (18 April 2009)
- Biggest defeat: Čelik 3–1 Sarajevo (2 August 2008)

The 2008–09 Sarajevo season was the club's 60th season in history, and their 15th consecutive season in the top flight of Bosnian football, the Premier League of BiH. Besides competing in the Premier League, the team competed in the National Cup.

== Squad information ==
=== First-team squad ===
Note: Flags indicate national team as defined under FIFA eligibility rules; some limited exceptions apply. Players may hold more than one non-FIFA nationality.

No.	Pos.	Nation	Player
1	GK	BIH	Irfan Fejzić
2	MF	BIH	Samir Duro
3	DF	BIH	Anel Škoro
4	DF	KOS	Patrik Doçi
5	MF	BIH	Edin Dudo
6	DF	BIH	Nihad Suljević
7	FW	BIH	Haris Handžić
7	MF	BIH	Faruk Ihtijarević
8	MF	BIH	Milan Muminović
9	FW	BIH	Admir Raščić
9	FW	BIH	Dalibor Pandža
10	FW	BIH	Alen Škoro
11	FW	BIH	Emir Obuća
12	GK	BIH	Dino Hamzić
13	MF	BIH	Adis Kapetanović
14	MF	BIH	Muhamed Džakmić
16	FW	BIH	Nedim Hiroš

No.	Pos.	Nation	Player
17	DF	BIH	Denis Čomor
17	DF	SRB	Vladimir Nikitović
18	FW	MKD	Adis Jahović
19	MF	BIH	Ajdin Maksumić
19 6	DF	BIH	Sedin Torlak
20	DF	BIH	Mirza Rizvanović
21	DF	SRB	Zoran Belošević
22	GK	BIH	Muhamed Alaim (captain)
23	FW	BIH	Almir Pliska
25	DF	SVN	Gregor Mohar
32	DF	BIH	Zdravko Šaraba
32	GK	BIH	Ibro Hodžić
33	MF	BIH	Emir Janjoš
77	MF	BIH	Damir Hadžić
88	MF	BIH	Emir Dokara
—	MF	BIH	Nedžad Serdarević

== Kit ==
Supplier	Sponsors	
(United States) Nike	(Bosnia and Herzegovina) AurA	Front
(United States) Nike	(Bosnia and Herzegovina) Bosnalijek	Back

== Competitions ==
=== Overview ===
Competition	First match	Last match	Starting round	Final position	Record							
Competition	First match	Last match	Starting round	Final position	Pld	W	D	L	GF	GA	GD	Win %
Premier League	2 August 2008	23 May 2009	Matchday 1	4th	30	14	7	9	43	30	+13	46.67
Cup of BiH	24 September 2008		First round	First round	1	0	1	0	0	0	+0	0.00
Total					31	14	8	9	43	30	+13	45.16

Source: Competitions

=== Premier League ===
==== League table ====
Pos	Team	Pld	W	D	L	GF	GA	GD	Pts	Qualification or relegation
2	Slavija	30	15	7	8	36	28	+8	52	Qualification to Europa League second qualifying round (Note: Slavija won 2008–09 Bosnian Cup and thereby qualified for the second qualifying round of the UEFA Europa League. Since they also finished second in the league, all three Europa League spots were awarded to teams according to their league positions.)
3	Sloboda Tuzla	30	15	5	10	32	26	+6	50	Ineligible for 2009–10 European competitions (Note: Borac Banja Luka and Sloboda Tuzla were denied a license for European competitions so their places were taken by next best finishers who obtained the license. Thereby, Sarajevo qualified for the second instead of first qualifying round of the UEFA Europa League, while the remaining spot in the first qualifying round of the UEFA Europa League was given to Široki Brijeg.)
4	Sarajevo	30	14	7	9	43	30	+13	49 (Note: Sarajevo ahead of Borac Banja Luka on head-to-head record: Sarajevo–Borac Banja Luka 2–1, Borac Banja Luka–Sarajevo 0–0.)	Qualification to Europa League second qualifying round
5	Borac Banja Luka	30	15	4	11	45	26	+19	49	Ineligible for 2009–10 European competitions
6	Široki Brijeg	30	14	3	13	47	38	+9	45	Qualification to Europa League first qualifying round

Source: RSSSF.org
Rules for classification: 1st points; 2nd goal difference; 3rd goals scored
For deciding champions, qualification to UEFA Europa League and relegation: 1st points; 2nd head-to-head points; 3rd head-to-head goal difference; 4th head-to-head goals scored; 5th head-to-head away goals scored; 6th goal difference; 7th goals scored

==== Results summary ====
Overall								Home						Away					
Pld	W	D	L	GF	GA	GD	Pts	W	D	L	GF	GA	GD	W	D	L	GF	GA	GD
30	14	7	9	43	30	+13	49	12	2	1	31	8	+23	2	5	8	12	22	−10

Source: Sportsport.ba

==== Results by round ====
Round	1	2	3	4	5	6	7	8	9	10	11	12	13	14	15	16	17	18	19	20	21	22	23	24	25	26	27	28	29	30
Ground	A	H	A	H	A	A	H	A	H	A	H	A	H	A	H	H	A	H	A	H	H	A	H	A	H	A	H	A	H	A
Result	L	W	D	W	D	L	L	W	W	D	W	L	D	W	D	W	L	W	L	W	W	D	W	D	W	L	W	L	W	L
Position	13	6	8	5	6	9	11	9	4	6	5	5	6	4	5	5	5	5	5	4	4	4	4	4	2	4	3	4	3	4

Source: Competitions
A = Away; H = Home; W = Win; D = Draw; L = Loss

==== Matches ====
2 August 2008 1	Čelik	3–1	Sarajevo	Zenica
		Report		Stadium: Bilino Polje Stadium; Attendance: 12,000

9 August 2008 2	Sarajevo	3–0	Zrinjski	Sarajevo
		Report		Stadium: Asim Ferhatović Hase Stadium; Attendance: 4,000

16 August 2008 3	Orašje	2–2	Sarajevo	Orašje
		Report		Stadium: Orašje City Stadium; Attendance: 700

23 August 2008 4	Sarajevo	1–0	Leotar	Sarajevo
		Report		Stadium: Asim Ferhatović Hase Stadium; Attendance: 2,500

30 August 2008 5	Borac	0–0	Sarajevo	Banja Luka
		Report		Stadium: Banja Luka City Stadium; Attendance: 8,000

13 September 2008 6	Zvijezda	2–1	Sarajevo	Gradačac
		Report		Stadium: Banja Ilidža; Attendance: 5,000

20 September 2008 7	Sarajevo	1–2	Široki Brijeg	Sarajevo
		Report		Stadium: Asim Ferhatović Hase Stadium; Attendance: 3,500

27 September 2008 8	Travnik	1–2	Sarajevo	Travnik
		Report		Stadium: Pirota Stadium; Attendance: 2,000

4 October 2008 9	Sarajevo	2–1	Sloboda	Sarajevo
		Report		Stadium: Asim Ferhatović Hase Stadium; Attendance: 2,000

18 October 2008 10	Velež	1–1	Sarajevo	Mostar
		Report		Stadium: Vrapčići Stadium; Attendance: 3,000

26 October 2008 11	Sarajevo	2–1	Modriča Maxima	Sarajevo
		Report		Stadium: Asim Ferhatović Hase Stadium; Attendance: 3,000

1 November 2008 12	Laktaši	2–0	Sarajevo	Laktaši
		Report		Stadium: Laktaši City Stadium; Attendance: 2,000

8 November 2008 13	Sarajevo	0–0	Željezničar	Sarajevo
		Report		Stadium: Asim Ferhatović Hase Stadium; Attendance: 9,000

16 November 2008 14	Posušje	1–3	Sarajevo	Posušje
		Report		Stadium: Mokri Dolac Stadium; Attendance: 700

22 November 2008 15	Sarajevo	1–1	Slavija	Sarajevo
		Report		Stadium: Asim Ferhatović Hase Stadium; Attendance: 1,500

28 February 2009 16	Sarajevo	1–0	Čelik	Sarajevo
		Report		Stadium: Asim Ferhatović Hase Stadium; Attendance: 5,000

7 March 2009 17	Zrinjski	2–0	Sarajevo	Mostar
		Report		Stadium: Bijeli Brijeg Stadium; Attendance: 4,000

14 March 2009 18	Sarajevo	2–0	Orašje	Sarajevo
		Report		Stadium: Asim Ferhatović Hase Stadium; Attendance: 2,500

21 March 2009 19	Leotar	1–0	Sarajevo	Trebinje
		Report		Stadium: Police Stadium; Attendance: 400

4 April 2009 20	Sarajevo	2–1	Borac	Sarajevo
		Report		Stadium: Asim Ferhatović Hase Stadium; Attendance: 2,000

8 April 2009 21	Sarajevo	2–1	Zvijezda	Sarajevo
		Report		Stadium: Asim Ferhatović Hase Stadium; Attendance: 1,500

11 April 2009 22	Široki Brijeg	1–1	Sarajevo	Široki Brijeg
		Report		Stadium: Pecara Stadium; Attendance: 3,000

18 April 2009 23	Sarajevo	6–1	Travnik	Sarajevo
		Report		Stadium: Asim Ferhatović Hase Stadium; Attendance: 2,000

22 April 2009 24	Sloboda	0–0	Sarajevo	Tuzla
		Report		Stadium: Tušanj City Stadium; Attendance: 4,000

25 April 2009 25	Sarajevo	3–0	Velež	Sarajevo
		Report		Stadium: Asim Ferhatović Hase Stadium; Attendance: 2,500

29 April 2009 26	Modriča Maxima	2–0	Sarajevo	Modriča
		Report		Stadium: Maxima Stadium; Attendance: 1,000

3 May 2009 27	Sarajevo	1–0	Laktaši	Sarajevo
		Report		Stadium: Asim Ferhatović Hase Stadium; Attendance: 2,500

9 May 2009 28	Željezničar	2–0	Sarajevo	Sarajevo
		Report		Stadium: Grbavica Stadium; Attendance: 8,000

16 May 2009 29	Sarajevo	4–0	Posušje	Sarajevo
		Report		Stadium: Asim Ferhatović Hase Stadium; Attendance: 1,500

23 May 2009 30	Slavija	2–1	Sarajevo	Istočno Sarajevo
		Report		Stadium: City Stadium SRC Slavija; Attendance: 2,500

=== Cup of Bosnia and Herzegovina ===
==== Round of 32 ====
24 September 2008	Sloboda	0–0 (4–1 p)	Sarajevo	Tuzla
19:30 CEST (UTC+2)		Report		Stadium: Tušanj City Stadium; Attendance: 4,500

== Statistics ==
Appearances

Rank	Player	Games
1	(Bosnia and Herzegovina) Muhamed Alaim	29
2	(Serbia) Zoran Belošević	28
3	(Bosnia and Herzegovina) Nedim Hiroš	28
4	(Bosnia and Herzegovina) Damir Hadžić	26

Goalscorers

Rank	Player	Goals
1.	(Bosnia and Herzegovina) Admir Raščić	9
2.	(Bosnia and Herzegovina) Alen Škoro	6
3.	(Bosnia and Herzegovina) Damir Hadžić	4
4.	(Bosnia and Herzegovina) Dalibor Pandža	3
