= 2005–06 FK Sarajevo season =

Sarajevo
2005–06 season
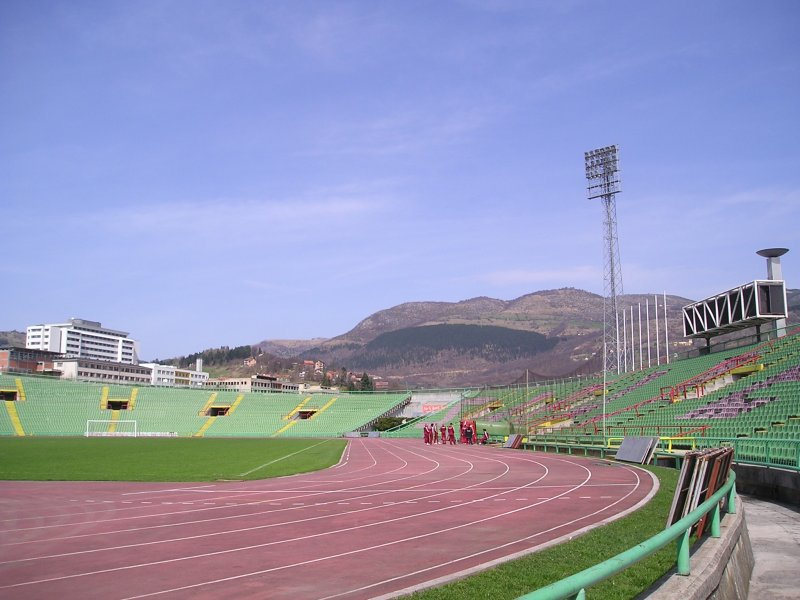
- Asim Ferhatović Hase Stadium in 2006
- Sporting director: Mirza Varešanović
- Chairman: Savo Vlaški; Hajrudin Šuman
- Manager: Husref Musemić
- Stadium: Asim Ferhatović Hase Stadium
- Premier League BiH: 2nd
- Cup of BiH: Quarter–finals
- Top goalscorer: League: Alen Avdić (8); All: Alen Avdić (12)
- Highest home attendance: 18,000 vs Željezničar (15 October 2005)
- Lowest home attendance: 400 vs Borac (19 October 2005); 400 vs Budućnost (26 November 2005)
- Average home league attendance: 3,933
- Biggest win: Sarajevo 6–1 Čelik (29 October 2005)
- Biggest defeat: Zrinjski 3–1 Sarajevo (19 March 2006)

The 2005–06 Sarajevo season was the club's 57th season in history, and their 12th consecutive season in the top flight of Bosnian football, the Premier League of BiH. Besides competing in the Premier League, the team competed in the National Cup.

== Squad information ==
=== First-team squad ===
Note: Flags indicate national team as defined under FIFA eligibility rules; some limited exceptions apply. Players may hold more than one non-FIFA nationality.

No.	Pos.	Nation	Player
4	MF	BIH	Ajdin Maksumić
5	DF	BIH	Muhidin Zukić
6	DF	BIH	Vule Trivunović
7	MF	BIH	Faruk Ihtijarević
8	MF	BIH	Veldin Muharemović
9	MF	BIH	Albin Pelak (captain)
9	FW	BIH	Emir Obuća
10	FW	BIH	Admir Hasančić
10	MF	BIH	Arben Avdija
11	MF	BIH	Senad Repuh (captain)
13	FW	BIH	Adis Kapetanović
14	MF	BIH	Muhamed Džakmić
15	MF	BIH	Damir Hadžić
17	FW	BIH	Samir Šarić
18	MF	BIH	Samir Duro
20	FW	CRO	Matija Matko (on loan from CSKA Sofia)

No.	Pos.	Nation	Player
22	GK	BIH	Muhamed Alaim
23	DF	BIH	Marinko Mačkić
33	MF	BIH	Emir Janjoš
—	GK	BIH	Elvis Karić
—	DF	BIH	Almir Alić
—	DF	BIH	Semir Čomaga
—	DF	BIH	Armin Džananović
—	DF	BIH	Elvis Imširović
—	DF	BIH	Dalibor Nedić
—	DF	BIH	Elvedin Spahić
—	MF	BIH	Aldin Janjoš
—	MF	BIH	Adi Kapetanović
—	FW	BIH	Vladimir Karalić
—	MF	BIH	Mirza Selimović
—	FW	BIH	Alen Avdić
—	MF	BIH	Amar Ferhatović

== Kit ==
Supplier	Sponsor
(Italy) Legea	(Bosnia and Herzegovina) Code

== Competitions ==
=== Overview ===
Competition	First match	Last match	Starting round	Final position	Record							
Competition	First match	Last match	Starting round	Final position	Pld	W	D	L	GF	GA	GD	Win %
Premier League	6 August 2005	13 May 2006	Matchday 1	2nd	30	18	6	6	57	26	+31	60.00
Cup of BiH	21 September 2005	16 November 2005	First round	Quarter-finals	5	3	1	1	10	5	+5	60.00
Total					35	21	7	7	67	31	+36	60.00

Source: Competitions

=== Premier League ===
==== League table ====
Pos	Team	Pld	W	D	L	GF	GA	GD	Pts	Qualification or relegation
1	Široki Brijeg (C)	30	19	6	5	38	19	+19	63	Qualification to Champions League first qualifying round
2	Sarajevo	30	18	6	6	57	26	+31	60	Qualification to UEFA Cup first qualifying round
3	Zrinjski	30	17	3	10	47	29	+18	54	Qualification to Intertoto Cup first round
4	Modriča	30	17	2	11	53	30	+23	53	
5	Slavija	30	12	5	13	41	47	−6	41	

Source: RSSSF.org
Rules for classification: 1) points; 2) goal difference; 3) number of goals scored.
(C) Champions

==== Results summary ====
Overall								Home						Away					
Pld	W	D	L	GF	GA	GD	Pts	W	D	L	GF	GA	GD	W	D	L	GF	GA	GD
30	18	6	6	57	26	+31	60	13	2	0	37	6	+31	5	4	6	20	20	0

Source: Sportsport.ba

==== Results by round ====
Round	1	2	3	4	5	6	7	8	9	10	11	12	13	14	15	16	17	18	19	20	21	22	23	24	25	26	27	28	29	30
Ground	A	A	H	A	H	A	H	A	H	A	H	A	H	A	H	H	H	A	H	A	H	A	H	A	H	A	H	A	H	A
Result	D	W	W	W	W	D	W	D	D	W	W	L	W	L	W	D	W	W	W	L	W	L	W	W	W	L	W	L	W	D
Position	9	6	4	3	3	3	3	3	3	3	2	3	2	3	2	2	2	2	2	2	2	2	2	2	2	2	2	2	2	2

Source: Competitions
A = Away; H = Home; W = Win; D = Draw; L = Loss

==== Matches ====
6 August 2005 1	Slavija	1–1	Sarajevo	Istočno Sarajevo
		Report		Stadium: City Stadium SRC Slavija; Attendance: 4,000

13 August 2005 2	Posušje	0–1	Sarajevo	Posušje
		Report		Stadium: Mokri Dolac Stadium; Attendance: 1,500

20 August 2005 3	Sarajevo	2–0	Žepče Limorad	Sarajevo
		Report		Stadium: Asim Ferhatović Hase Stadium; Attendance: 6,000

28 August 2005 4	Radnik	0–3	Sarajevo	Bijeljina
		Report		Stadium: Bijeljina City Stadium; Attendance: 2,500

11 September 2005 5	Sarajevo	1–0	Zrinjski	Sarajevo
		Report		Stadium: Asim Ferhatović Hase Stadium; Attendance: 9,000

17 September 2005 6	Leotar	1–1	Sarajevo	Trebinje
		Report		Stadium: Police Stadium; Attendance: 1,000

24 September 2005 7	Sarajevo	2–0	Jedinstvo	Sarajevo
		Report		Stadium: Asim Ferhatović Hase Stadium; Attendance: 1,000

1 October 2005 8	Orašje	1–1	Sarajevo	Orašje
		Report		Stadium: Orašje City Stadium; Attendance: 1,000

15 October 2005 9	Sarajevo	0–0	Željezničar	Sarajevo
		Report		Stadium: Asim Ferhatović Hase Stadium; Attendance: 18,000

22 October 2005 10	Sloboda	1–3	Sarajevo	Tuzla
		Report		Stadium: Tušanj City Stadium; Attendance: 3,000

29 October 2005 11	Sarajevo	6–1	Čelik	Sarajevo
		Report		Stadium: Asim Ferhatović Hase Stadium; Attendance: 7,000

5 November 2005 12	Modriča Maxima	2–0	Sarajevo	Modriča
		Report		Stadium: Modriča City Stadium; Attendance: 2,500

12 November 2005 13	Sarajevo	3–0	Travnik	Sarajevo
		Report		Stadium: Asim Ferhatović Hase Stadium; Attendance: 600

20 November 2005 14	Široki Brijeg	2–1	Sarajevo	Široki Brijeg
		Report		Stadium: Pecara Stadium; Attendance: 2,000

26 November 2005 15	Sarajevo	2–1	Budućnost	Sarajevo
		Report		Stadium: Asim Ferhatović Hase Stadium; Attendance: 400

25 February 2006 16	Sarajevo	1–1	Slavija	Sarajevo
		Report		Stadium: Asim Ferhatović Hase Stadium; Attendance: 3,000

4 March 2006 17	Sarajevo	3–0	Posušje	Sarajevo
		Report		Stadium: Asim Ferhatović Hase Stadium; Attendance: 1,000

12 March 2006 18	Žepče Limorad	1–3	Sarajevo	Žepče
		Report		Stadium: Žepče City Stadium; Attendance: 900

16 March 2006 19	Sarajevo	4–1	Radnik	Sarajevo
		Report		Stadium: Asim Ferhatović Hase Stadium; Attendance: 3,000

19 March 2006 20	Zrinjski	3–1	Sarajevo	Mostar
		Report		Stadium: Stadion pod Bijelim Brijegom; Attendance: 6,000

22 March 2006 21	Sarajevo	1–0	Leotar	Sarajevo
		Report		Stadium: Asim Ferhatović Hase Stadium; Attendance: 1,000

25 March 2006 22	Jedinstvo	1–0	Sarajevo	Bihać
		Report		Stadium: Pod Borićima Stadium; Attendance: 6,000

1 April 2006 23	Sarajevo	5–1	Orašje	Sarajevo
		Report		Stadium: Asim Ferhatović Hase Stadium; Attendance: 1,500

5 April 2006 24	Željezničar	0–1	Sarajevo	Sarajevo
		Report		Stadium: Grbavica Stadium; Attendance: 12,000

8 April 2006 25	Sarajevo	2–0	Sloboda	Sarajevo
		Report		Stadium: Asim Ferhatović Hase Stadium; Attendance: 3,000

15 April 2006 26	Čelik	2–1	Sarajevo	Zenica
		Report		Stadium: Bilino Polje Stadium; Attendance: 14,000

22 April 2006 27	Sarajevo	2–1	Modriča Maxima	Sarajevo
		Report		Stadium: Asim Ferhatović Hase Stadium; Attendance: 2,500

29 April 2006 28	Travnik	2–0	Sarajevo	Travnik
		Report		Stadium: Pirota Stadium; Attendance: 1,000

6 May 2006 29	Sarajevo	3–0	Široki Brijeg	Sarajevo
		Report		Stadium: Asim Ferhatović Hase Stadium; Attendance: 2,000

13 May 2006 30	Budućnost	3–3	Sarajevo	Banovići
		Report		Stadium: Stadion FK Budućnost; Attendance: 700

=== Cup of Bosnia and Herzegovina ===
==== Round of 32 ====
21 September 2005	Sarajevo	2–0	Leotar	Sarajevo
	Avdić 33', 90'	Report		Stadium: Asim Ferhatović Hase Stadium; Attendance: 1,000

==== Round of 16 ====
19 October 2005 First leg	Sarajevo	4–0	Borac	Sarajevo
		Report		Stadium: Asim Ferhatović Hase Stadium; Attendance: 400

26 October 2005 Second leg	Borac	1–3 (1–7 agg.)	Sarajevo	Banja Luka
		Report		Stadium: Banja Luka City Stadium; Attendance: 700

==== Quarter-finals ====
9 November 2005 First leg	Sarajevo	1–1	Željezničar	Sarajevo
		Report		Stadium: Asim Ferhatović Hase Stadium; Attendance: 15,000

16 November 2005 Second leg	Željezničar	3–0 (4–1 agg.)	Sarajevo	Sarajevo
		Report		Stadium: Grbavica Stadium; Attendance: 8,000
Note: Match was abandoned at 50th minute because the Sarajevo players attacked the referee.
