= 2007–08 Premier League of Bosnia and Herzegovina =

Premijer Liga
- Season: 2007–08
- Champions: Modriča; 1st Premier League title 1st Bosnian title
- Relegated: Jedinstvo; Žepče
- Champions League: Modriča
- UEFA Cup: Široki Brijeg; Zrinjski (via domestic cup)
- Intertoto Cup: Čelik
- Matches: 240
- Goals: 654 (2.73 per match)
- Top goalscorer: Darko Spalević (18 goals)

The 2007–08 Premijer Liga season, the eighth since its establishment and the sixth as a unified country-wide league, began on 4 August 2007. FK Sarajevo are the defending Premijer Liga champions, having won their first Premijer Liga title and fourth league championship overall the previous season.

The 2006–07 season saw Borac and Radnik relegated to the Prva Liga RS. They were replaced by Laktaši and Travnik from the Prva Liga RS and FBiH respectively.

== Clubs and stadiums ==
Location of clubs in Premijer Liga 2007-08

Team	Location	Stadium
Čelik	Zenica	Bilino Polje
Jedinstvo	Bihać	Stadion pod Borićima
Laktaši	Laktaši	Gradski stadion (Laktaši)
Leotar	Trebinje	Stadion Police
Modriča	Modriča	Stadion Dr. Milan Jelić
Orašje	Orašje	Gradski stadion (Orašje)
Posušje	Posušje	Mokri Dolac Stadium
Sarajevo	Sarajevo	Asim Ferhatović Hase Stadium
Sloboda	Tuzla	Stadion Tušanj
Slavija	Istočno Sarajevo	Gradski SRC Slavija
Široki Brijeg	Široki Brijeg	Stadion Pecara
Travnik	Travnik	Stadion Pirota
Velež	Mostar	Vrapčići Stadium
Zrinjski	Mostar	Stadion pod Bijelim Brijegom
Željezničar	Sarajevo	Stadion Grbavica
Žepče	Žepče	Gradski stadion (Žepče)

== Premijer Liga All-Star Team (1st Half Season) ==
Coaches of each team in the league decided to vote for players who have impressed the most in the first half of the season. The only twist is that the coaches couldn't vote a player from their own team. Coaches that participated in the votes are: Slaviša Bižičić (FK Modriča), Husref Musemić (FK Sarajevo), Enver Hadžiabdić (FK Željezničar), Pavle Skočibušić (NK Žepče), Dušan Jevrić (Slavija Sarajevo), Mirza Golubica (NK Travnik), Sakib Malkočević (Sloboda Tuzla), Anel Karabeg (FK Velež Mostar), Vlado Jagodić (FK Laktaši), Mario Ćutuk (NK Široki Brijeg), Ivo Ištuk (NK Čelik Zenica), Ahmet Kečalović (NK Jedinstvo Bihać), Dragan Jović (HŠK Zrinjski Mostar), Srđan Bajić (FK Leotar Trebinje), Vinko Jurišić (NK Posušje) and Bakir Beširević (HNK Orašje).

Note: Flags indicate national team as defined under FIFA eligibility rules; some limited exceptions apply. Players may hold more than one non-FIFA nationality.

No.	Pos.	Nation	Player
-	GK	BIH	Jasmin Burić (NK Čelik Zenica)
-	DF	BIH	Dalibor Šilić (NK Široki Brijeg)
-	DF	BIH	Semjon Milošević (FK Sarajevo)
-	DF	BIH	Velimir Vidić (NK Široki Brijeg)
-	DF	BIH	Veldin Muharemović (FK Sarajevo)
-	MF	BIH	Semir Štilić (FK Željezničar)
-	MF	BIH	Almir Turković (FK Sarajevo)
-	MF	BIH	Djordje Savić (FK Modriča)
-	MF	BIH	Sulejman Smajić (HŠK Zrinjski Mostar)
-	FW	BIH	Sanel Jahić (FK Željezničar)
-	FW	BIH	Stevo Nikolic (FK Modriča)

Other players that have been voted:

Vasilj, Tripic, Lukačević, Matko, Šabić, S. Nikolić, Hasanović, Mikelini, Mulalić, Vugdalić, Rajović, Stojanović, Marković, Bajić, Karadža, Stjepanović, Krstanović, Režić, Rogulj, Ronielle, Admir Raščić, Celson, Landeka, Kordić 1, A. Joldić, Mulina, Pejić, Ančić, Barišić, Bajić

== League table ==
Pos	Team	Pld	W	D	L	GF	GA	GD	Pts	Qualification or relegation
1	Modriča (C)	30	18	1	11	57	45	+12	55	Qualification to Champions League first qualifying round
2	Široki Brijeg	30	17	3	10	44	29	+15	54	Qualification to UEFA Cup first qualifying round
3	Čelik Zenica	30	16	4	10	38	32	+6	52	Qualification to Intertoto Cup first round
4	Zrinjski	30	15	4	11	46	27	+19	49	Qualification to UEFA Cup first qualifying round (Note: Zrinjski won 2007–08 Bosnian Cup and qualified for the first qualifying round of the UEFA Cup.)
5	Sarajevo	30	14	6	10	42	29	+13	48	
6	Sloboda Tuzla	30	15	2	13	44	38	+6	47	
7	Željezničar	30	14	3	13	47	35	+12	45	
8	Slavija	30	14	2	14	39	44	−5	44	
9	Velež	30	14	2	14	39	46	−7	44	
10	Laktaši	30	13	4	13	42	40	+2	43	
11	Posušje	30	13	4	13	42	46	−4	43	
12	Orašje	30	13	3	14	50	45	+5	42	
13	Travnik	30	13	3	14	35	39	−4	42	
14	Leotar	30	13	2	15	38	45	−7	41	
15	Jedinstvo Bihać (R)	30	12	4	14	28	43	−15	40	Relegation to Prva Liga FBiH
16	Žepče (R)	30	2	1	27	25	73	−48	7	Relegation to Prva Liga FBiH

Source: RSSSF.org
Rules for classification: 1) points; 2) goal difference; 3) number of goals scored.
(C) Champions; (R) Relegated

== Results ==
Home \ Away	ČEL	JED	LAK	LEO	MOD	ORA	POS	SAR	SLA	SLO	ŠB	TRA	VEL	ZRI	ŽEL	ŽEP
Čelik		1–0	1–0	2–0	3–1	2–0	3–0	1–0	2–0	1–0	3–2	0–0	2–0	1–0	3–0	4–1
Jedinstvo	1–1		2–0	0–0	1–1	0–0	3–2	1–0	3–1	2–1	1–0	1–0	1–0	2–1	1–0	2–0
Laktaši	4–0	2–0		4–0	2–1	5–2	1–1	1–3	2–1	2–0	2–0	3–1	3–2	3–2	3–2	2–0
Leotar	2–0	4–1	4–0		1–2	2–0	1–0	2–0	4–3	2–0	1–2	1–0	2–1	0–2	1–0	2–0
Modriča	2–0	3–0	1–0	2–1		4–1	4–1	0–1	1–0	3–2	2–1	6–1	3–1	2–1	1–0	6–2
Orašje	3–0	2–1	1–0	3–0	4–0		4–2	3–1	2–1	2–2	2–0	2–0	6–0	0–0	1–0	2–0
Posušje	3–2	1–0	1–1	0–0	1–3	3–1		0–0	3–0	4–1	1–0	1–0	1–0	1–0	3–0	3–1
Sarajevo	3–0	4–0	2–0	3–0	2–4	4–1	3–1		1–1	2–1	2–2	1–0	1–0	1–0	0–0	3–0
Slavija	0–1	2–1	0–0	3–0	1–0	3–2	2–0	1–0		3–1	0–2	4–0	2–1	2–0	3–0	2–1
Sloboda Tuzla	2–0	1–0	1–0	2–0	3–0	1–0	4–2	1–0	2–0		3–0	2–0	5–1	1–2	2–1	3–0
Široki Brijeg	0–0	2–1	1–0	2–0	4–1	1–0	1–2	1–0	3–1	2–0		1–0	2–0	1–0	2–1	1–0
Travnik	0–0	2–0	5–1	4–1	1–0	1–0	2–0	1–0	0–1	2–1	1–5		2–0	2–1	1–0	4–1
Velež	2–0	2–1	3–2	3–2	2–2	3–1	2–0	2–2	4–0	2–0	1–1	2–1		1–0	2–1	1–0
Zrinjski	3–1	4–1	2–0	2–1	4–0	2–0	1–0	4–0	2–0	0–0	2–1	1–1	2–0		1–1	2–1
Željezničar	3–2	6–0	1–0	3–0	0–0	2–1	4–2	0–0	4–0	4–0	2–1	1–0	4–0	2–1		1–0
Žepče	0–2	0–1	1–1	0–2	1–3	5–4	2–3	1–3	0–1	1–2	0–3	2–3	1–3	1–4	3–0 (Note: The match was suspended after the 94th minute with the score at 1–0 when Željezničar's supporters attacked the players of home team. The match was later awarded 3–0 to Žepče.)	

Source: RSSSF.org
Legend: Blue = home team win; Yellow = draw; Red = away team win.

== Top goalscorers ==
Rank	Player	Club	Goals
1	(Serbia) Darko Spalević	Slavija	18
2	(Bosnia and Herzegovina) Stevo Nikolić	Modriča	15
3	(Croatia) Ivan Krstanović	Posušje	14
3	(Bosnia and Herzegovina) Senad Mujić	Orašje	14
5	(Bosnia and Herzegovina) Feđa Dudić	Travnik	13
6	(Bosnia and Herzegovina) Sanel Jahić	Željezničar	12
7	(Bosnia and Herzegovina) Krešimir Kordić	Posušje	11
7	(Bosnia and Herzegovina) Emir Hadžić	Čelik	11
