= 2009–10 FK Sarajevo season =

Sarajevo
2009–10 season
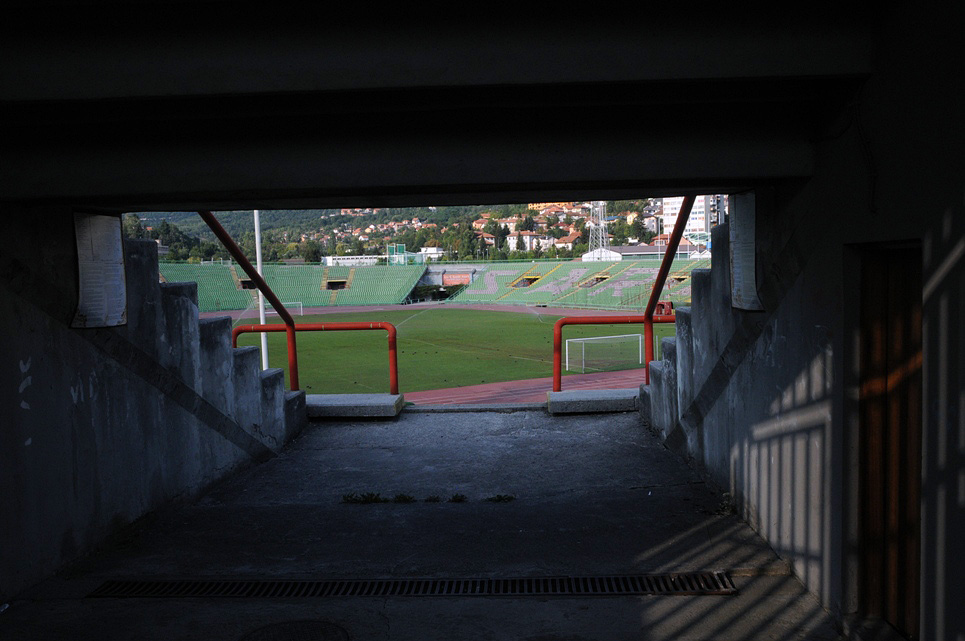
- Entrance to Koševo Stadium 26.8.2009.
- Sporting director: Senad Merdanović
- Chairman: Hajrudin Šuman; Nijaz Merdanović
- Manager: Mehmed Janjoš (until 28 March); Mirza Varešanović (from 7 April)
- Stadium: Asim Ferhatović Hase Stadium
- Premier League BiH: 5th
- Cup of BiH: Round of 16
- UEFA Europa League: Play-offs
- Top goalscorer: League: Alen Škoro (13); All: Alen Škoro (13)
- Highest home attendance: 20,000 vs Cluj (20 August 2009)
- Lowest home attendance: 0 (three matches)
- Average home league attendance: 3,750
- Biggest win: Sarajevo 4–0 Radnik Hadžići (16 September 2009); Slavija 0–4 Sarajevo (9 May 2010)
- Biggest defeat: Modriča Maxima 3–0 Sarajevo (9 August 2009)

The 2009–10 Sarajevo season was the club's 61st season in history, and their 16th consecutive season in the top flight of Bosnian football, the Premier League of BiH. Besides competing in the Premier League, the team competed in the National Cup and the qualifications for UEFA Europa League. During the season club changed the managers. Mirza Varešanović become the Sarajevo's manager on 7 April 2010, after Mehmed Janjoš left the position on 28 March. During the transition period, Almir Turković, assistant coach of Mehmed Janjoš, was positioned as the head coach. The season covers the period from 25 June 2009 to 24 June 2010.

In this season, Sarajevo reached the play-off round of Europa League, which is one of the best results in European competitions in "after-war era" of club's history. Team finished in 5th place of Premier League, and they ended their Cup journey in Second round.

== Squad information ==
=== First-team squad ===
Note: Flags indicate national team as defined under FIFA eligibility rules; some limited exceptions apply. Players may hold more than one non-FIFA nationality.

No.	Pos.	Nation	Player
3	DF	BIH	Anel Škoro
4	DF	SLO	Gregor Mohar
5	MF	BIH	Edin Dudo
6	DF	BIH	Sedin Torlak
7	FW	BIH	Haris Handžić
7	MF	BIH	Faruk Ihtijarević
8	MF	BIH	Milan Muminović
9	FW	BIH	Alen Avdić
10	FW	BIH	Alen Škoro
12	GK	BIH	Dino Hamzić
13	DF	BIH	Fadil Čizmić
14	MF	BIH	Muhamed Džakmić
15	MF	BIH	Nail Šehović
16 74	MF	BIH	Dženaldin Hamzagić
17	DF	BIH	Denis Čomor

No.	Pos.	Nation	Player
18	FW	MKD	Adis Jahović
19	MF	BIH	Ajdin Maksumić
20	DF	BIH	Mirza Rizvanović
21	DF	SRB	Zoran Belošević
22	GK	BIH	Muhamed Alaim (captain)
23	FW	BIH	Almir Pliska
24	DF	BIH	Amer Dupovac
25	FW	BIH	Jasmin Čampara
32	GK	BIH	Ibro Hodžić
33	MF	BIH	Emir Janjoš
77	MF	BIH	Damir Hadžić
88	MF	BIH	Kenan Handžić
—	MF	BIH	Adi-Amar Fočić
—	DF	BIH	Amar Kadić
—	FW	BIH	Edin Šeko

== Kit ==
Supplier	Sponsors	
(United States) Nike	(Bosnia and Herzegovina) AurA	Front
(United States) Nike	(Bosnia and Herzegovina) Bosnalijek	Back

== Competitions ==
=== Overview ===
Competition	First match	Last match	Starting round	Final position	Record							
Competition	First match	Last match	Starting round	Final position	Pld	W	D	L	GF	GA	GD	Win %
Premier League	2 August 2009	26 May 2010	Matchday 1	5th	30	14	8	8	43	25	+18	46.67
Cup of BiH	16 September 2009	21 October 2009	Round of 32	Round of 16	3	1	2	0	5	1	+4	33.33
Europa League	16 July 2009	27 August 2009	Second qualifying round	Play-off round	6	2	2	2	7	7	+0	33.33
Total					39	17	12	10	55	33	+22	43.59

Source: Competitions

=== Premier League ===
==== League table ====
Pos	Team	Pld	W	D	L	GF	GA	GD	Pts	Qualification or relegation
3	Borac Banja Luka	30	17	2	11	37	29	+8	53	Qualification to Europa League second qualifying round (Note: Borac Banja Luka were the winners of the 2009–10 Bosnian Cup competition and qualified for the second qualifying round of the UEFA Europa League.)
4	Zrinjski	30	15	6	9	46	33	+13	51	Qualification to Europa League first qualifying round
5	Sarajevo	30	14	8	8	43	25	+18	50	
6	Olimpic	30	12	8	10	30	34	−4	44	
7	Velež	30	13	4	13	42	33	+9	43	

Source: sportsport.ba
Rules for classification: 1st points; 2nd goal difference; 3rd goals scored
For deciding champions, qualification to UEFA Europa League and relegation: 1st points; 2nd head-to-head points; 3rd head-to-head goal difference; 4th head-to-head goals scored; 5th head-to-head away goals scored; 6th goal difference; 7th goals scored

==== Results summary ====
Overall								Home						Away					
Pld	W	D	L	GF	GA	GD	Pts	W	D	L	GF	GA	GD	W	D	L	GF	GA	GD
30	14	8	8	43	25	+18	50	11	4	0	30	7	+23	3	4	8	13	18	−5

Source: sportsport.ba

==== Results by round ====
Round	1	2	3	4	5	6	7	8	9	10	11	12	13	14	15	16	17	18	19	20	21	22	23	24	25	26	27	28	29	30
Ground	H	A	H	A	H	H	A	H	A	H	A	H	A	H	A	A	H	A	H	A	A	H	A	H	A	H	A	H	A	H
Result	D	L	D	D	W	W	L	W	L	W	D	W	W	W	W	L	W	L	W	L	L	W	D	D	L	W	W	D	D	W
Position	8	15	12	15	10	5	8	4	8	7	8	5	5	4	3	4	4	5	4	4	5	4	5	5	5	4	4	5	5	5

Source: Competitions
A = Away; H = Home; W = Win; D = Draw; L = Loss

==== Matches ====
2 August 2009 1	Sarajevo	1–1	Sloboda	Sarajevo
20:00	Hadžić 72'; Maksumić (yellow card)	Report		Stadium: Asim Ferhatović Hase Stadium; Attendance: 3,000; Referee: Ognjen Valjić (Banja Luka)

9 August 2009 2	Modriča Maxima	3–0	Sarajevo	Modriča
		Report		Stadium: Stadion Dr. Milan Jelić; Attendance: 1,500

15 August 2009 3	Sarajevo	1–1	Velež	Sarajevo
		Report		Stadium: Asim Ferhatović Hase Stadium; Attendance: 5,000

31 August 2009 5	Sarajevo	2–1	Travnik	Sarajevo
		Report		Stadium: Asim Ferhatović Hase Stadium; Attendance: 3,500

12 September 2009 6	Sarajevo	3–1	Laktaši	Sarajevo
		Report		Stadium: Asim Ferhatović Hase Stadium; Attendance: 1,500

19 September 2009 7	Leotar	1–0	Sarajevo	Trebinje
		Report		Stadium: Police Stadium; Attendance: 1,000

26 September 2009 8	Sarajevo	3–1	Čelik	Sarajevo
		Report		Stadium: Asim Ferhatović Hase Stadium; Attendance: 3,500

4.10.2009. 9.	NK Široki Brijeg	Abandoned	FK Sarajevo	Široki Brijeg
				Stadium: Stadion Pecara

13 October 2009 4	Olimpik	1–1	Sarajevo	Sarajevo
		Report		Stadium: Stadion Grbavica; Attendance: 500

17 October 2009 10	Sarajevo	1–0	Zvijezda	Sarajevo
		Report		Stadium: Asim Ferhatović Hase Stadium; Attendance: 2,500

25 October 2009 11	Zrinjski	1–1	Sarajevo	Mostar
		Report		Stadium: Stadion pod Bijelim Brijegom; Attendance: 1,500

31 October 2009 12	Sarajevo	2–0	Slavija	Sarajevo
		Report		Stadium: Asim Ferhatović Hase Stadium; Attendance: 4,000

4 November 2009 9	Široki Brijeg	2–0	Sarajevo	Široki Brijeg
		Report		Stadium: Stadion Pecara; Attendance: 3,000

7 November 2009 13	Željezničar	1–2	Sarajevo	Sarajevo
		Report		Stadium: Stadion Grbavica; Attendance: 12,000

21 November 2009 14	Sarajevo	3–0	Rudar	Sarajevo
		Report		Stadium: Asim Ferhatović Hase Stadium; Attendance: 3,000

29 November 2009 15	Borac	0–1	Sarajevo	Banja Luka
		Report		Stadium: Banja Luka City Stadium; Attendance: 11,000

27.2.2010. 16.	FK Sloboda Tuzla	3:1	FK Sarajevo	Tuzla
				Stadium: Tušanj City Stadium

6 March 2010 17	Sarajevo	2–0	Modriča Maxima	Sarajevo
		Report		Stadium: Asim Ferhatović Hase Stadium; Attendance: 4,000

17 March 2010 18	Velež	1–0	Sarajevo	Mostar
		Report		Stadium: Vrapčići Stadium; Attendance: 4,000

20 March 2010 19	Sarajevo	2–1	Olimpik	Sarajevo
		Report		Stadium: Asim Ferhatović Hase Stadium; Attendance: 5,000

24 March 2010 16	Sloboda	1–0	Sarajevo	Tuzla
		Report		Stadium: Tušanj City Stadium; Attendance: 3,200

27 March 2010 20	Travnik	1–0	Sarajevo	Travnik
		Report		Stadium: Stadion Pirota; Attendance: 2,500

3 April 2010 21	Laktaši	2–1	Sarajevo	Laktaši
		Report		Stadium: Laktaši City Stadium; Attendance: 1,500

10 April 2010 22	Sarajevo	3–0	Leotar	Sarajevo
		Report		Stadium: Asim Ferhatović Hase Stadium; Attendance: 2,000

17 April 2010 23	Čelik	0–0	Sarajevo	Zenica
		Report		Stadium: Bilino Polje Stadium; Attendance: 9,000

21 April 2010 24	Sarajevo	1–1	Široki Brijeg	Sarajevo
		Report		Stadium: Asim Ferhatović Hase Stadium; Attendance: 8,000

25 April 2010 25	Zvijezda	2–1	Sarajevo	Gradačac
		Report		Stadium: Stadion Banja Ilidža; Attendance: 3,000

1 May 2010 26	Sarajevo	3–0	Zrinjski	Sarajevo
		Report		Stadium: Asim Ferhatović Hase Stadium; Attendance: 0

9 May 2010 27	Slavija	0–4	Sarajevo	Istočno Sarajevo
		Report		Stadium: City Stadium SRC Slavija; Attendance: 1,500

15 May 2010 28	Sarajevo	0–0	Željezničar	Sarajevo
		Report		Stadium: Asim Ferhatović Hase Stadium; Attendance: 0

23 May 2010 29	Rudar	2–2	Sarajevo	Prijedor
		Report		Stadium: Prijedor City Stadium; Attendance: 2,000

26 May 2010 30	Sarajevo	3–0	Borac	Sarajevo
		Report		Stadium: Asim Ferhatović Hase Stadium; Attendance: 0

=== Cup of Bosnia and Herzegovina ===
==== Round of 32 ====
16 September 2009	Sarajevo	4–0	Radnik Hadžići	Sarajevo
16:00 CEST (UTC+2)		Report		Stadium: Asim Ferhatović Hase Stadium; Attendance: 1,500

==== Round of 16 ====
30 September 2009 First leg	Sarajevo	1–1	Zrinjski	Sarajevo
18:30 CEST (UTC+2)		Report		Stadium: Asim Ferhatović Hase Stadium; Attendance: 4,000

21 October 2009 Second leg	Zrinjski	0–0 (1–1 agg.)	Sarajevo	Mostar
15:00 CEST (UTC+2)		Report		Stadium: Stadion pod Bijelim Brijegom; Attendance: 1,500

=== UEFA Europa League ===
==== Second qualifying round ====
On 22 June, Sarajevo were drawn to face Spartak Trnava (Slovakia) or Inter Baku (Azerbaijan) in the Second qualifying round of the UEFA Europa League. On 9 July, it was determined that Spartak would be Sarajevo's opponent, having defeated Inter 5–2 on aggregate. By winning 2–1 on aggregate, Sarajevo secured place in the Third qualifying round. Before the second leg match, supporters of both teams had a fight on the streets of Trnava, which resulted in few injured fans.

16 July 2009 First leg	Sarajevo (Bosnia and Herzegovina)	1–0	(Slovakia) Spartak Trnava	Sarajevo, Bosnia and Herzegovina
20:15 CEST (UTC+2)	Muminović 14'	Report		Stadium: Asim Ferhatović Hase Stadium; Attendance: 14,000; Referee: David Malcolm (Northern Ireland)

23 July 2009 Second leg	Spartak Trnava (Slovakia)	1–1 (1–2 agg.)	(Bosnia and Herzegovina) Sarajevo	Trnava, Slovakia
19:30 CEST (UTC+2)	Procházka (yellow card) 14'; Doležaj 19'; Kotula (yellow card) 72'	Report	Janjoš (yellow card) 8'; Hadžić (yellow card) 80'; Jahović 88'; Avdić (yellow card) 89'	Stadium: Štadión Antona Malatinského; Attendance: 8,215; Referee: Leontios Trattou (Cyprus)

==== Third qualifying round ====
30 July 2009 First leg	Helsingborg (Sweden)	2–1	(Bosnia and Herzegovina) Sarajevo	Helsingborg, Finland
20:45 CEST (UTC+2)	C. Andersson 6' (pen.); Skúlason (yellow card) 26', (goal) 58'	Report	Torlak (yellow card) 5'; Hadžić 22'; Janjoš (yellow card) 45+3' (yellow-red card) 50'; Alaim (yellow card) 55'; Maksumić (yellow card) 59'	Stadium: Olympia; Attendance: 11,136; Referee: Mark Whitby (Wales)

6 August 2009 Second leg	Sarajevo (Bosnia and Herzegovina)	2–1 (a.e.t.) (3–3 agg.) (5–4 p)	(Sweden) Helsingborg	Sarajevo, Bosnia and Herzegovina
20:15 CEST (UTC+2)	Hadžić 38'; Maksumić (yellow card) 49'; Avdić 78'; Muminović (yellow card) 117'	Report	Jönsson 2'; Ekstrand (yellow card) 26'; Tamboura (yellow card) 90'	Stadium: Asim Ferhatović Hase Stadium; Attendance: 15,000; Referee: Aleksei Kulbakov (Belarus)
	Penalties
	Jahović (penalty scored); Ihtijarević (penalty scored); Rizvanović (penalty scored); Maksumić (penalty scored); Hamzagić (penalty scored)		(penalty scored) Sundin; (penalty missed) Ekstrand; (penalty scored) Nilsson; (penalty scored) Makondele; (penalty scored) Wahlstedt

==== Play-off round ====
20 August 2009 First leg	Sarajevo (Bosnia and Herzegovina)	1–1	(Romania) CFR Cluj	Sarajevo, Bosnia and Herzegovina
20:15 CEST (UTC+2)	Hadžić 77'; Hamzagić (yellow card) 80'	Report	Dani 19'	Stadium: Asim Ferhatović Hase Stadium; Attendance: 20,000; Referee: Robert Małek (Poland)

27 August 2009 Second leg	CFR Cluj (Romania)	2–1 (3–2 agg.)	(Bosnia and Herzegovina) Sarajevo	Cluj-Napoca, Romania
19:45 EEST (UTC+3)	Tony (yellow card) 32'; Koné 40'; Dubarbier (yellow card) 66'; Mureșan 69'	Report	Maksumić (yellow card) 39'; Avdić 81', (yellow card) 90+5'	Stadium: Stadionul Dr. Constantin Rădulescu; Attendance: 10,800; Referee: Duarte Gomes (Portugal)

== Statistics ==
Rank	Player	Games
1.	(Serbia) Zoran Belošević	39
2.	(Bosnia and Herzegovina) Muhamed Alaim	38
3.	(Bosnia and Herzegovina) Mirza Rizvanović	36
4.	(Bosnia and Herzegovina) Sedin Torlak	33
5.	(Bosnia and Herzegovina) Edin Dudo	33
6.	(Bosnia and Herzegovina) Damir Hadžić	33

Rank	Player	Goals
1.	(Bosnia and Herzegovina) Alen Škoro	13
2.	(North Macedonia) Adis Jahović	8
3.	(Bosnia and Herzegovina) Alen Avdić	7
4.	(Bosnia and Herzegovina) Damir Hadžić	5
5.	(Bosnia and Herzegovina) Faruk Ihtijarević	5
6.	(Bosnia and Herzegovina) Mirza Rizvanović	4

== See also ==
- 2009 NK Široki Brijeg–FK Sarajevo football riots
