= 2002–03 Premier League of Bosnia and Herzegovina =

Premijer Liga
- Season: 2002–03
- Champions: Leotar; 1st Premier League title 1st Bosnian title
- Relegated: Kozara; Jedinstvo; Velež; Mladost (G); Budućnost; Bosna
- Champions League: Leotar
- UEFA Cup: Željezničar; Sarajevo
- Intertoto Cup: Sloboda
- Matches: 380
- Goals: 1,072 (2.82 per match)
- Top goalscorer: Emir Obuća (24 goals)

The 2002–03 Premier League of Bosnia and Herzegovina was the third season since its establishment and distinguishes itself from previous seasons by having expanded the country-wide league to include the clubs from Republika Srpska in the competition. This season began on 3 August 2002 and ended on 24 May 2003.

The league was won by FK Leotar after a dramatic last round where they defeated away team Rudar Ugljevik (2–1). Široki Brijeg defended successfully against the defending home champions Željezničar (1–0).

== Clubs and stadiums ==
Location of clubs in Premijer Liga 2002-03

Club	City	Stadium
Borac	Banja Luka	Banja Luka City Stadium
Bosna	Visoko	Stadion Luke
Brotnjo	Čitluk	Bare Stadium
Budućnost	Banovići	Gradski stadion (Banovići)
Čelik	Zenica	Bilino Polje
Glasinac	Sokolac	Stadion FK Glasinac
Jedinstvo	Bihać	Stadion pod Borićima
Kozara	Gradiška	Gradski stadion (Gradiška)
Leotar	Trebinje	Stadion Police
Mladost	Gacko	Gradski stadion (Gacko)
Orašje	Orašje	Gradski stadion (Orašje)
Posušje	Posušje	Mokri Dolac Stadium
Rudar	Ugljevik	Novi Gradski Stadion
Sarajevo	Sarajevo	Asim Ferhatović Hase Stadium
Sloboda	Tuzla	Stadion Tušanj
Široki Brijeg	Široki Brijeg	Stadion Pecara
Velež	Mostar	Vrapčići Stadium
Zrinjski	Mostar	Stadion pod Bijelim Brijegom
Željezničar	Sarajevo	Stadion Grbavica
Žepče	Žepče	Gradski stadion (Žepče)

== League standings ==
Pos	Team	Pld	W	D	L	GF	GA	GD	Pts	Qualification or relegation
1	Leotar (C)	38	26	7	5	82	27	+55	85	Qualification to Champions League first qualifying round
2	Željezničar	38	24	10	4	66	24	+42	82	Qualification to UEFA Cup qualifying round
3	Sarajevo	38	19	12	7	83	39	+44	69	Qualification to UEFA Cup qualifying round
4	Široki Brijeg	38	21	5	12	69	45	+24	68	
5	Čelik	38	16	10	12	61	33	+28	58	
6	Sloboda Tuzla	38	16	6	16	51	38	+13	54	Qualification to Intertoto Cup first round
7	Borac Banja Luka	38	16	6	16	50	49	+1	54	
8	Orašje	38	15	9	14	50	57	−7	54	
9	Posušje	38	16	6	16	42	55	−13	54	
10	Žepče	38	14	11	13	48	50	−2	53	
11	Zrinjski	38	17	2	19	46	65	−19	53	
12	Rudar Ugljevik	38	16	4	18	61	57	+4	52	
13	Brotnjo	38	15	7	16	47	55	−8	52	
14	Glasinac	38	16	4	18	37	54	−17	52	
15	Kozara (R)	38	15	6	17	55	62	−7	51	Relegation to Prva Liga RS
16	Jedinstvo Bihać (R)	38	15	5	18	59	62	−3	50	Relegation to Prva Liga FBiH
17	Velež (R)	38	14	3	21	47	59	−12	45	Relegation to Prva Liga FBiH
18	Mladost Gacko (R)	38	11	6	21	40	65	−25	39	Relegation to Prva Liga RS
19	Budućnost (R)	38	10	8	20	48	67	−19	38	Relegation to Prva Liga FBiH
20	Bosna (R)	38	4	1	33	28	107	−79	13	Relegation to Prva Liga FBiH

Source: RSSSF.org
Rules for classification: 1) points; 2) goal difference; 3) number of goals scored.
(C) Champions; (R) Relegated

== Results ==
Home \ Away	BOR	BOS	BRO	BUD	ČEL	GLA	JED	KOZ	LEO	MGA	ORA	POS	RUG	SAR	SLO	ŠB	VEL	ZRI	ŽEL	ŽEP
Borac Banja Luka		3–1	3–1	5–0	0–1	0–2	2–1	2–1	0–3	3–0	2–1	2–1	0–0	0–0	1–0	3–2	1–1	1–2	2–0	3–0
Bosna	1–2		1–2	0–2	2–0	0–3	1–0	1–2	0–9	2–3	1–1	0–1	2–4	2–3	2–5	0–1	1–0	0–2	0–1	2–1
Brotnjo	1–2	3–1		2–2	1–1	3–0	0–0	4–2	0–1	1–0	3–0	0–1	2–1	2–1	1–0	1–2	3–0	4–1	3–2	0–0
Budućnost	3–3	2–0	5–0		2–1	0–0	2–1	3–2	1–2	3–1	4–1	1–1	0–0	1–1	1–1	1–3	2–1	3–0	3–4	2–3
Čelik	3–1	4–0	3–1	3–0		4–0	4–2	3–0	0–0	5–0	2–0	5–0	2–1	1–1	3–0	0–0	2–3	4–0	0–0	1–0
Glasinac	0–2	4–0	0–1	2–1	1–0		1–0	2–0	1–1	1–0	3–1	1–0	3–1	2–1	1–0	2–0	3–2	3–0	0–1	0–0
Jedinstvo Bihać	4–0	4–2	1–1	2–0	1–1	2–0		3–0	0–1	2–1	2–1	5–2	3–1	1–5	2–1	5–2	1–0	4–1	0–0	1–1
Kozara	1–0	2–1	0–1	3–2	2–1	5–0	1–0		2–2	3–2	1–1	4–1	2–1	1–1	1–0	2–0	1–0	2–1	0–0	3–2
Leotar	2–1	2–1	4–0	3–0	0–0	3–0	2–0	1–0		4–0	2–0	4–0	3–2	3–2	1–0	1–0	4–1	4–0	2–2	5–0
Mladost Gacko	2–0	3–0	0–0	1–0	0–0	1–0	2–3	1–1	1–1		2–0	5–2	2–1	1–0	2–1	0–0	0–1	2–1	0–2	0–1
Orašje	1–0	3–0	2–0	1–0	2–2	4–2	1–0	2–2	0–0	4–3		2–0	2–0	2–0	3–2	3–2	3–0	1–0	1–1	3–1
Posušje	3–2	2–0	2–0	2–1	0–0	2–0	2–1	3–1	0–3	2–0	0–0		2–0	3–0	0–1	2–1	2–0	1–0	0–0	1–1
Rudar Ugljevik	1–2	2–0	2–1	2–1	3–1	1–0	2–0	3–1	1–2	4–1	5–0	2–0		1–1	1–0	2–0	4–0	4–1	0–1	1–3
Sarajevo	3–0	5–0	5–1	0–0	3–1	2–0	3–0	6–3	2–0	4–0	3–0	4–0	4–2		2–0	4–4	3–1	6–1	1–1	0–0
Sloboda Tuzla	1–0	6–1	3–0	2–0	1–0	0–0	0–0	2–1	1–4	2–0	3–1	2–1	4–2	1–1		4–0	4–0	1–0	0–1	1–0
Široki Brijeg	2–1	1–0	1–1	4–0	1–0	5–0	6–3	2–1	2–1	2–0	4–0	3–0	1–0	3–0	1–1		2–1	4–0	1–0	3–0
Velež	0–0	4–0	0–1	3–0	1–0	3–0	2–0	2–1	3–0	2–1	1–1	1–3	3–0	1–3	1–0	1–3		4–1	0–1	2–1
Zrinjski	2–0	4–2	1–0	2–0	2–1	2–0	3–1	2–1	1–0	5–2	2–1	1–0	4–0	2–0	1–1	1–0	1–0		1–1	0–1
Željezničar	1–0	5–0	4–2	3–0	2–0	2–0	6–2	1–0	3–1	1–0	1–0	2–0	0–1	1–1	1–0	1–0	4–1	3–0		6–1
Žepče	1–1	6–1	1–0	2–0	0–2	4–0	4–0	3–1	0–1	1–1	1–1	0–0	3–3	0–0	1–0	3–1	2–1	1–0	1–1	

Source: RSSSF.org
Legend: Blue = home team win; Yellow = draw; Red = away team win.

== Champions ==
FK Leotar Trebinje (Coach: - Mile Jovin)
Squad:

- Dušan Berak - Gk
- Goran Berak - Gk
- Aleksandar Božović - Gk
- Uroš Golubović - Gk
- Gavrilo Čorlija - Df
- Ninoslav Milenković - Df
- Igor Miljanović - Df
- Saša Miljanović - Df
- Dejan Musović - Df
- Zdravko Šaraba - Df
- Bojan Vučinić - Df
- Predrag Vukičević - Df
- Savo Andrić - Mf
- Slavoljub Đorđević - Mf
- Aleksandar Hajder - Mf
- Pajo Janković - Mf
- Dušan Kerkez - Mf
- Branislav Krunić - Mf
- Jovo Mišeljić - Mf
- Siniša Mulina - Mf
- Pavle Delibašić - Fw
- Milan Joksimović - Fw
- Željko Kokić - Fw
- Ljubiša Porobić - Fw
- Željko Radović - Fw
- Damjan Ratković - Fw
- Nenad Stojanović - Fw

== Top goalscorers ==
Rank	Player	Club	Goals
1	(Bosnia and Herzegovina) Emir Obuća	Sarajevo	23
2	(Serbia and Montenegro) Nenad Stojanović	Leotar	21
2	(Croatia) Hrvoje Erceg	Široki Brijeg	21
4	(Bosnia and Herzegovina) Senad Brkić	Čelik	20
4	(Serbia and Montenegro) Predrag Stoiljković	Kozara	20
6	(Serbia and Montenegro) Zoran Đurišić	Rudar Ugljevik	19
7	(Bosnia and Herzegovina) Slaven Damjanović	Orašje	16
8	(Bosnia and Herzegovina) Faik Kamberović	Budućnost	15
8	(Bosnia and Herzegovina) Siniša Mulina	Leotar	15
8	(Bosnia and Herzegovina) Vahidin Imamović	Žepče	15
