= Muhamed Džakmić =

Bosnian footballer (born 1985)

Personal information
- Date of birth: 23 August 1985 (age 41)
- Place of birth: Sarajevo, SFR Yugoslavia
- Height: 1.78 m (5 ft 10 in)
- Position: Midfielder

Youth career
- 1996–2003: Sarajevo

Senior career*
Years	Team	Apps	(Gls)
2003–2011	Sarajevo	134	(6)
2011–2012	Gangwon	35	(0)
2013–2014	Sarajevo	16	(3)
Total		185	(9)

International career
2010	Bosnia and Herzegovina	1	(0)

Managerial career
- 2016: Sarajevo (assistant)
- 2017–2019: Sarajevo (assistant)
- 2024–2025: Bosnia and Herzegovina U17
- 2025: Sarajevo (assistant)
- * Club domestic league appearances and goals

Muhamed Džakmić (born 23 August 1985) is a Bosnian football manager and former player who was most recently the manager of the Bosnia and Herzegovina U17 national team and the assistant manager of Bosnian Premier League club Sarajevo.

== Club career ==
Džakmić played as a midfielder for hometown club Sarajevo on two occasions and for Gangwon in the South Korean K League 1. With Sarajevo, he won the national league in the 2006–07 season and the national cup in the seasons 2004–05 and 2013–14. Džakmić retired in 2014 while playing for Sarajevo at only the age of 29.

== International career ==
On 10 December 2010, Džakmić made his national team debut in a friendly game against Poland. It remained his sole international appearance.

== Career statistics ==
=== Club ===
Appearances and goals by club, season and competition
Club	Season	League			National cup (Note: Includes Bosnian Cup, Korean FA Cup)		League cup (Note: Includes Korean League Cup)		Continental		Total	
Club	Season	Division	Apps	Goals	Apps	Goals	Apps	Goals	Apps	Goals	Apps	Goals
Sarajevo	2003–04	Bosnian Premier League	8	0	0	0	—		0	0	8	0
Sarajevo	2004–05	Bosnian Premier League	15	0	4	0	—		—		19	0
Sarajevo	2005–06	Bosnian Premier League	17	0	2	0	—		—		19	0
Sarajevo	2006–07	Bosnian Premier League	19	0	6	0	—		1 (Note: Appearance(s) in UEFA Cup)	0	26	0
Sarajevo	2007–08	Bosnian Premier League	17	0	2	0	—		6 (Note: Five appearances in UEFA Champions League; one appearance in UEFA Cup)	0	25	0
Sarajevo	2008–09	Bosnian Premier League	23	2	1	0	—		—		24	2
Sarajevo	2009–10	Bosnian Premier League	23	2	2	0	—		6 (Note: Appearance(s) in UEFA Europa League)	0	31	2
Sarajevo	2010–11	Bosnian Premier League	12	2	4	1	—		–		16	3
Sarajevo	Total		134	6	21	1	–		13	0	168	7
Gangwon	2011	K League 1	14	0	3	1	3	0	—		20	1
Gangwon	2012	K League 1	21	0	0	0	—		—		21	0
Gangwon	Total		35	0	3	1	3	0	—		41	1
Sarajevo	2012–13	Bosnian Premier League	13	2	—		—		—		13	2
Sarajevo	2013–14	Bosnian Premier League	3	1	0	0	—		4	0	7	1
Sarajevo	Total		16	3	0	0	—		4	0	20	3
Career total			185	9	24	2	3	0	17	0	229	11

=== International ===
Appearances and goals by national team and year
National team	Year	Apps	Goals
Bosnia and Herzegovina	2010	1	0
Total		1	0

== Honours ==
=== Player ===
Sarajevo

- Bosnian Premier League: 2006–07
- Bosnian Cup: 2004–05, 2013–14
