= Damir Hadžić =

Damir Hadžić may refer to:

- Damir Hadžić (footballer, born 1978), Bosnian-Herzegovinian footballer
- Damir Hadžić (footballer, born 1984), Slovenian footballer
