= Haris Handžić =

Bosnian footballer (born 1990)

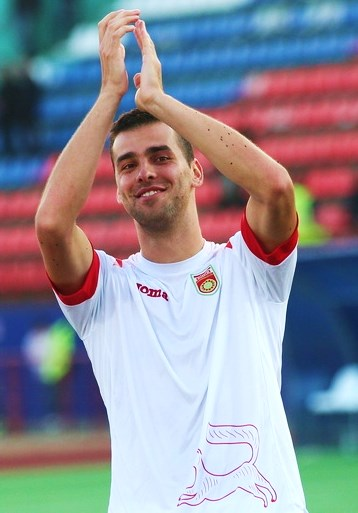
- Handžić with Ufa in 2014

Personal information
- Date of birth: 20 June 1990 (age 36)
- Place of birth: Sarajevo, SFR Yugoslavia
- Height: 1.91 m (6 ft 3 in)
- Position: Striker

Youth career
- –2008: Sarajevo

Senior career*
Years	Team	Apps	(Gls)
2007–2009	Sarajevo	34	(10)
2009–2010	Lech Poznań	1	(0)
2010	→ Sarajevo (loan)	12	(1)
2010–2011	Sarajevo	18	(4)
2012	Velež Mostar	6	(0)
2012–2013	Rudar Prijedor	26	(7)
2013	Vaduz	14	(0)
2014	Borac Banja Luka	10	(8)
2014–2016	Ufa	48	(5)
2016–2017	Rijeka	4	(0)
2017	Debrecen	12	(2)
2017–2018	Zrinjski Mostar	23	(7)
2018–2021	Sarajevo	65	(12)
2021	Ahed	0	(0)
2022	Radnik Bijeljina	10	(2)
2022–2023	Leotar	19	(6)
2023	Riteriai	14	(1)

International career
2008	Bosnia and Herzegovina	1	(0)
- * Club domestic league appearances and goals as of 20 June 2024

Haris Handžić (born 20 June 1990) is a Bosnian professional footballer who plays as a striker.

== Club career ==
Coming through the youth system, Handžić began his senior career at hometown club Sarajevo in 2007. He returned to Sarajevo in 2018, winning multiple two Bosnian Premier League titles and two Bosnian Cups, before leaving in 2021 following his contract's expiration.

On 17 July 2021, Handžić joined Lebanese Premier League side Ahed, to be used in the 2021 AFC Cup.

On 14 July 2023, he signed with Lithuanian club Riteriai Club. On 16 July 2023, he made his debut against „Dainava“ Club. On 23 July 2023, he scored his sole goal for Riteriai against „Džiugas“ Club. On 16 November 2023, it was announced he left the club.

== International career ==
Handžić played for Bosnia and Herzegovina in an unofficial game against Poland in December 2007; he made his official debut in a June 2008 friendly match against Azerbaijan.

== Career statistics ==
=== Club ===
Appearances and goals by club, season and competition
Club	Season	League			National cup (Note: Includes Bosnia and Herzegovina Cup, Polish Cup, Liechtenstein Cup, Russian Cup, Croatian Cup, Lithuanian Cup)		Continental		Other		Total	
Club	Season	Division	Apps	Goals	Apps	Goals	Apps	Goals	Apps	Goals	Apps	Goals
Sarajevo	2007–08	Bosnian Premier League	23	5			2 (Note: One appearance in UEFA Champions League; one appearance in UEFA Cup)	0	—		25	5
Sarajevo	2008–09	Bosnian Premier League	11	3			—		—		11	3
Sarajevo	Total		34	8			2	0	—		36	8
Lech Poznań	2008–09	Ekstraklasa	0	0	1	0	—		—		1	0
Lech Poznań	2009–10	Ekstraklasa	1	0	0	0	1 (Note: Appearance(s) in UEFA Europa League)	0	1 (Note: Appearance(s) in Polish Super Cup)	0	3	0
Lech Poznań	Total		1	0	1	0	1	0	1	0	4	0
Sarajevo (loan)	2009–10	Bosnian Premier League	12	1	—		—		—		12	1
Sarajevo	2010–11	Bosnian Premier League	9	4			—		—		9	4
Sarajevo	2011–12	Bosnian Premier League	9	0			4	0	—		13	0
Sarajevo	Total		30	5			4	0	—		34	5
Velež Mostar	2011–12	Bosnian Premier League	6	0	0	0	—		—		6	0
Rudar Prijedor	2012–13	Bosnian Premier League	26	7	1	0	—		—		27	7
Vaduz	2013–14	Swiss Challenge League	14	0	1	2	—		—		15	2
Borac Banja Luka	2013–14	Bosnian Premier League	10	8	—		—		—		10	8
Ufa	2014–15	Russian Premier League	29	4	2	2	—		—		31	6
Ufa	2015–16	Russian Premier League	19	1	2	0	—		—		21	1
Ufa	Total		48	5	4	2	—		—		52	7
Rijeka	2016–17	Prva HNL	4	0	2	0	2	0	—		8	0
Debreceni	2016–17	Nemzeti Bajnokság I	12	2	—		—		—		12	2
Zrinjski Mostar	2017–18	Bosnian Premier League	23	7	1	0	—		—		24	7
Sarajevo	2018–19	Bosnian Premier League	24	5	3	1	4	1	—		31	7
Sarajevo	2019–20	Bosnian Premier League	11	2	2	0	2	1	—		15	3
Sarajevo	2020–21	Bosnian Premier League	30	5	5	2	4 (Note: Two appearances in UEFA Champions League; two appearances in UEFA Europa League)	0	—		39	7
Sarajevo	Total		65	12	10	3	10	2	—		85	17
Al Ahed	2021–22	Lebanese Premier League	0	0	0	0	1 (Note: Appearance(s) in AFC Cup)	0	—		1	0
Radnik Bijeljina	2021–22	Bosnian Premier League	10	2	—		—		—		10	2
Leotar	2022–23	Bosnian Premier League	19	6	1	0	—		—		20	6
Riteriai	2023	A Lyga	14	1	1	0	—		—		15	1
Career total			316	63	22	7	20	2	1	0	359	72

=== International ===
As of match played 1 June 2008.

National team	Year	Apps	Goals
Bosnia and Herzegovina
Bosnia and Herzegovina	2008	1	0
Total		1	0

== Honours ==
Lech Poznań

- Ekstraklasa: 2009–10
- Polish Cup: 2008–09
- Polish Super Cup: 2009

Zrinjski Mostar

- Bosnian Premier League: 2017–18

Sarajevo

- Bosnian Premier League: 2018–19, 2019–20
- Bosnian Cup: 2018–19, 2020–21
