= Veldin Muharemović =

Bosnian football player (born 1984)

Personal information
- Date of birth: December 6, 1984 (age 41)
- Place of birth: Sarajevo, Bosnia and Herzegovina
- Height: 1.83 m (6 ft 0 in)
- Positions: Defender; midfielder

Senior career*
Years	Team	Apps	(Gls)
2003–2007	Sarajevo	95	(8)
2008–2010	Lokeren	49	(0)
2010–2011	Sarajevo	21	(4)
2011	Khazar Lankaran	0	(0)
2011–2016	Olimpic	113	(30)
2016–2022	Fola Esch	89	(5)
Total		367	(47)

International career
2006	Bosnia-Herzegovina U21	3	(0)
2007	Bosnia-Herzegovina	3	(0)
- * Club domestic league appearances and goals

Veldin Muharemović (born 6 December 1984) is a former Bosnian football player.

His fans gave him the nickname "Lede".

== Playing career ==
=== Club ===
He is a solid defender. He is credited by his teammates for his fighting spirit in the defensive line, usually disposing strikers from the ball and leading a counter-attack. He occasionally switches to a midfield role.

In January, 2008, he was sold to K.S.C. Lokeren in Belgium.

In 2010, he resigned for FK Sarajevo. However, in the summer transfer window of 2011, during July, he signed for Khazar Lankaran FK in Azerbaijan, only to cancel the transfer one month later and return home to Sarajevo, but this time to FK Olimpic Sarajevo instead of FK Sarajevo.

=== International ===
He made his debut for Bosnia and Herzegovina in a June 2007 European Championship qualification match against Malta and has earned a total of 3 caps, scoring no goals and all in UEFA Euro 2008 qualifying, in a total of 14 minutes. His final international was in November 2007 against Turkey.

== Career statistics ==
=== Club ===
Appearances and goals by club, season and competition
Club	Season	League			National cup (Note: Includes Bosnia and Herzegovina Cup, Belgian Cup, Luxembourg Cup)		Continental		Total	
Club	Season	Division	Apps	Goals	Apps	Goals	Apps	Goals	Apps	Goals
Sarajevo	2002–03	Bosnian Premier League	5	0	0	0	0	0	5	0
Sarajevo	2003–04	Bosnian Premier League	9	0	0	0	0	0	9	0
Sarajevo	2004–05	Bosnian Premier League	23	0	7	0	—		30	0
Sarajevo	2005–06	Bosnian Premier League	23	5	4	1	—		27	6
Sarajevo	2006–07	Bosnian Premier League	23	1	6	0	4 (Note: Appearance(s) in UEFA Cup)	0	33	1
Sarajevo	2007–08	Bosnian Premier League	12	2	3	0	7 (Note: Five appearances and one goal in UEFA Champions League; two appearances in UEFA Cup)	1	22	3
Sarajevo	Total		95	8	20	1	11	1	126	10
Lokeren	2007–08	Belgian Pro League	14	0	—		—		14	0
Lokeren	2008–09	Belgian Pro League	20	0	0	0	—		20	0
Lokeren	2009–10	Belgian Pro League	15	0	0	0	—		15	0
Lokeren	Total		49	0	0	0	—		49	0
Sarajevo	2010–11	Bosnian Premier League	21	4	3	0	—		24	4
Olimpic	2011–12	Bosnian Premier League	24	8	?	?	—		24	8
Olimpic	2012–13	Bosnian Premier League	25	7	5	0	—		30	7
Olimpic	2013–14	Bosnian Premier League	19	3	2	0	—		21	3
Olimpic	2014–15	Bosnian Premier League	19	6	8	4	—		27	10
Olimpic	2015–16	Bosnian Premier League	26	6	0	0	2 (Note: Appearance(s) in UEFA Europa League)	0	28	6
Olimpic	Total		113	30	15	4	2	0	130	34
Fola Esch	2016–17	Luxembourg National Division	21	2	6	1	2	0	29	3
Fola Esch	2017–18	Luxembourg National Division	21	2	1	0	6	0	28	2
Fola Esch	2018–19	Luxembourg National Division	20	0	1	0	3	0	24	0
Fola Esch	2019–20	Luxembourg National Division	12	1	3	0	2	0	17	1
Fola Esch	2020–21	Luxembourg National Division	9	0	1	0	0	0	10	0
Fola Esch	2021–22	Luxembourg National Division	6	0	0	0	1 (Note: Appearance(s) in UEFA Champions League)	0	7	0
Fola Esch	Total		89	5	12	1	14	0	115	6
Career total			367	47	50	6	27	1	444	54

=== International ===
National team	Year	Apps	Goals
Bosnia and Herzegovina	2007	3	0
Total		3	0

== Honours ==
=== Player ===
Sarajevo

- Bosnian Premier League: 2006–07
- Bosnian Cup: 2004–05

Olimpic

- Bosnian Cup: 2014–15

Fola Esch

- Luxembourg National Division: 2020–21
