= Sead Bučan =

Bosnian footballer

Personal information
- Full name: Sead Bučan
- Date of birth: 8 March 1981 (age 45)
- Place of birth: Sarajevo, SFR Yugoslavia
- Height: 1.80 m (5 ft 11 in)
- Position: Midfielder

Youth career
- –2001: Olimpik

Senior career*
Years	Team	Apps	(Gls)
2001–2004	Olimpik	51	(11)
2004–2005	Guangzhou R&F	26	(5)
2006–2008	Sarajevo	45	(5)
2008–2010	Željezničar	46	(4)
2010–2011	Split	26	(3)
2011	Borac Banja Luka	12	(1)
2012–2013	Olimpik	18	(1)
2013–2015	Željezničar	41	(5)
2015	Čelik Zenica	6	(0)
Total		271	(35)
- * Club domestic league appearances and goals

Sead Bučan (born 8 March 1981) is a Bosnian retired professional footballer who played as a midfielder.

== Honours ==
=== Player ===
Sarajevo

- Bosnian Premier League: 2006–07

Željezničar

- Bosnian Premier League: 2009–10
