= Miloš Babić (footballer) =

Bosnian-Herzegovinian footballer

Personal information
- Full name: Miloš Babić
- Date of birth: 10 September 1981 (age 45)
- Place of birth: Banja Luka, SFR Yugoslavia
- Height: 1.82 m (6 ft 0 in)
- Position: Defensive midfielder

Youth career
- 1991–1998: BSK Banja Luka
- 1998–2000: Obilić

Senior career*
Years	Team	Apps	(Gls)
2000–2004	Obilić	31	(1)
2004–2005	Borac Banja Luka	22	(0)
2005–2006	Paniliakos		
2006–2007	Sarajevo	11	(0)
2008	Laktaši	5	(0)
2008–2009	Leotar	10	(0)
2009–2010	Borac Banja Luka	18	(0)
2010–2014	BSK Banja Luka		
- * Club domestic league appearances and goals

Miloš Babić (Serbian Cyrillic: Милош Бабић; born 10 September 1981) is a Bosnian-Herzegovinian retired football midfielder.

== Club career ==
He has played for Serbian top league club FK Obilić, Greek Paniliakos F.C. and Bosnian clubs FK Borac Banja Luka, FK Sarajevo, FK Laktaši and FK Leotar.

== Honours ==
FK Sarajevo

- Premier League of Bosnia and Herzegovina: 2006-07
