= Semjon Milošević =

Bosnian footballer (born 1979)

Personal information
- Date of birth: 21 October 1979 (age 47)
- Place of birth: Čapljina, SR Bosnia and Herzegovina, SFR Yugoslavia
- Height: 1.91 m (6 ft 3 in)
- Position: Centre-back

Senior career*
Years	Team	Apps	(Gls)
1995–1996	Leotar	17	(1)
1997–1998	Sutjeska Nikšić	14	(0)
1998–1999	Leotar		
1999–2002	Sutjeska Nikšić	71	(5)
2002–2003	Modriča		
2003–2004	Leotar	13	(0)
2004–2005	Zrinjski Mostar	24	(1)
2005	Olimpik Baku	2	(0)
2006–2007	Posušje	25	(5)
2006–2008	FK Sarajevo	37	(5)
2008–2009	Cracovia	5	(0)
2009	Leotar	9	(0)
2010	Sloboda Tuzla	11	(2)
2010–2011	Čelik Zenica	24	(3)
2011–2012	Leotar	20	(1)
2014	Leotar	12	(0)
- * Club domestic league appearances and goals

Semjon Milošević (Serbian Cyrillic: Семјон Милошевић, born 21 October 1979) is a Bosnian former professional footballer who played as a centre-back.

== Club career ==
=== FR Yugoslavia ===
Born in Čapljina, SR Bosnia and Herzegovina, he started his career in FK Sutjeska Nikšić in the 1995–96 season. He played over 90 games in First League of FR Yugoslavia.

=== Bosnia-Herzegovina ===
In 2002, he moved to FK Modriča for their first Premier League season. In the next season, he moved to defending champion FK Leotar. For Leotar, he played at the 2005–06 UEFA Champions League qualifying. In 2004, he moved to HŠK Zrinjski Mostar and won the league title.

Then arrives move to Azerbaijani football club Olimpik Baku.

In the 2005–06 season he returned to his homeland, Bosnia and Herzegovina, to the NK Posušje club, and stayed in Posušje for another season. Then in January 2007 he moved to FK Sarajevo in the winter transfer window, and he won one more time in the Bosnian Premier League. Milošević played in the UEFA Champions League again, and eventually qualified to the 2007–08 UEFA Cup first round. In June 2009 Milosevic signed a contract with his first club, Leotar.

=== Poland ===
Is September 2008 Milošević moved to a Polish Ekstraklasa team Cracovia.

=== Return to Bosnia ===
He was back to FK Leotar in 2009 and played 5 games in the Bosnian Premier League before moving to FK Sloboda Tuzla during the winter break. In summer 2010 he moved to NK Čelik Zenica. He played 24 league games and Čelik lost the Bosnian Cup final against Željezničar that season. In summer 2011 he returned to FK Leotar. He played with Leotar in the 2014–15 season in the First League of the Republika Srpska.

== International career ==
Milošević was called up for the Bosnia and Herzegovina national team in September 2007, but he just appeared as unused substitute against Moldova.

== Honours ==
Zrinjski

- Premier League of Bosnia and Herzegovina: 2004–05

Sarajevo

- Premier League of Bosnia and Herzegovina: 2006–07

Individual

- Ismir Pintol trophy: 2008
