= Marciano (footballer) =

Brazilian footballer (born 1980)

Marciano José do Nascimento
Personal information
- Full name: Marciano José do Nascimento
- Date of birth: July 12, 1980 (age 46)
- Place of birth: Chapadinha, Brazil
- Height: 1.71 m (5 ft 7 in)
- Position: Midfielder

Team information
- Current team: Santa Quitéria

Senior career*
Years	Team	Apps	(Gls)
2002–2005	Moto Club	120	(9)
2005–2006	→ NK Čelik Zenica (loan)	30	(2)
2006–2007	→ FK Sarajevo (loan)	23	(3)
2007–2008	→ NK Široki Brijeg (loan)	37	(2)
2009–2010	Sandefjord	39	(1)
2011–2012	NK Široki Brijeg	23	(0)
2012–	Santa Quitéria	0	(0)
- * Club domestic league appearances and goals as of 29.1.2014

Marciano José do Nascimento (12 July 1980) is a Brazilian footballer who plays for Santa Quitéria.

During his spell with Moto Club de São Luís, he was loaned to Bosnian top league clubs NK Čelik Zenica, FK Sarajevo and NK Široki Brijeg. Afterwards, between January 2009 and January 2011 he played with Norwegian side Sandefjord Fotball in the Tippeligaen but returned to Bosnia when the club ended relegated by the end of 2010.
