= Marinko Mačkić =

Bosnian footballer (born 1983)

Personal information
- Date of birth: 28 March 1983 (age 43)
- Place of birth: Banja Luka, SFR Yugoslavia
- Position: Defender

Youth career
- 1993–1997: Sloboda Novi Grad
- Čukarički
- 1997–2000: Partizan

Senior career*
Years	Team	Apps	(Gls)
2000–2002	Mladost Lučani	69	(1)
2003	Vojvodina	1	(0)
2003–2005	Borac Banja Luka	54	(4)
2005–2006	FK Sarajevo	34	(2)
2007	Saba Battery	21	(0)

International career
	FR Yugoslavia U-19	1	(0)
2003–2005	Bosnia-Herzegovina U-21	10	(0)

Managerial career
- Sloboda Novi Grad
- Slovan Ljubljana (youth)
- * Club domestic league appearances and goals

Marinko Mačkić (born 28 March 1983) is a Bosnian-Herzegovinian football manager and former player. He usually played as a defender and he made his career in Serbia, Bosnia and Herzegovina and Iran.

== Club career ==
Born in Banja Luka, SR Bosnia and Herzegovina, Marinko began playing in FK Sloboda Novi Grad, before moving to Serbia to join the youth teams of FK Partizan. He also played in the youth team of FK Čukarički. He signed his first professional contract when he was 16, and he made his senior debut in 2000 when he joined FK Mladost Lučani playing in the Second League of FR Yugoslavia. In his first season there, they got promoted and played the 2001–02 season in the First League of FR Yugoslavia. However, their top-flight season did not end well, and Mladost ended the season relegated back to the Second League.

In the winter break of the 2002–03 season, Marinko Mačkić moved to the top-flight club FK Vojvodina, but did not have many chances to play in the first team, so he ended up returning to Bosnia, playing on loan with his home-town club, FK Borac Banja Luka, now in the newly created Premier League of Bosnia and Herzegovina.

In summer 2005 his loan deal ended, and he joined another Bosnian Premier League side, FK Sarajevo playing with them in the following one and a half seasons being coached by Husref Musemić. In the winter break of the 2006–07 season he moved to Iran by joining Saba Battery.

Because of health reasons he had to retire sooner than expected and became a coach. He first coached FK Sloboda Novi Grad and then became the coach of the youth team of Slovenian side ND Slovan.

== International career ==
Mačkić played for Bosnia and Herzegovina national under-21 football team on ten occasions, and was also called to play for the Bosnian national team in 2008 but failed to debut.

== Personal life ==
After seeing his career unexpectedly interrupted, Mačkić graduated at the Faculty of Sports in Sarajevo, and also obtained a UEFA coaching license.

He is married to Vesna and has a son named Damjan.

== Honours ==
FK Sarajevo

- Premier League of Bosnia and Herzegovina: 2006–07
