= Mirza Mešić =

Bosnia footballer (born 1980)

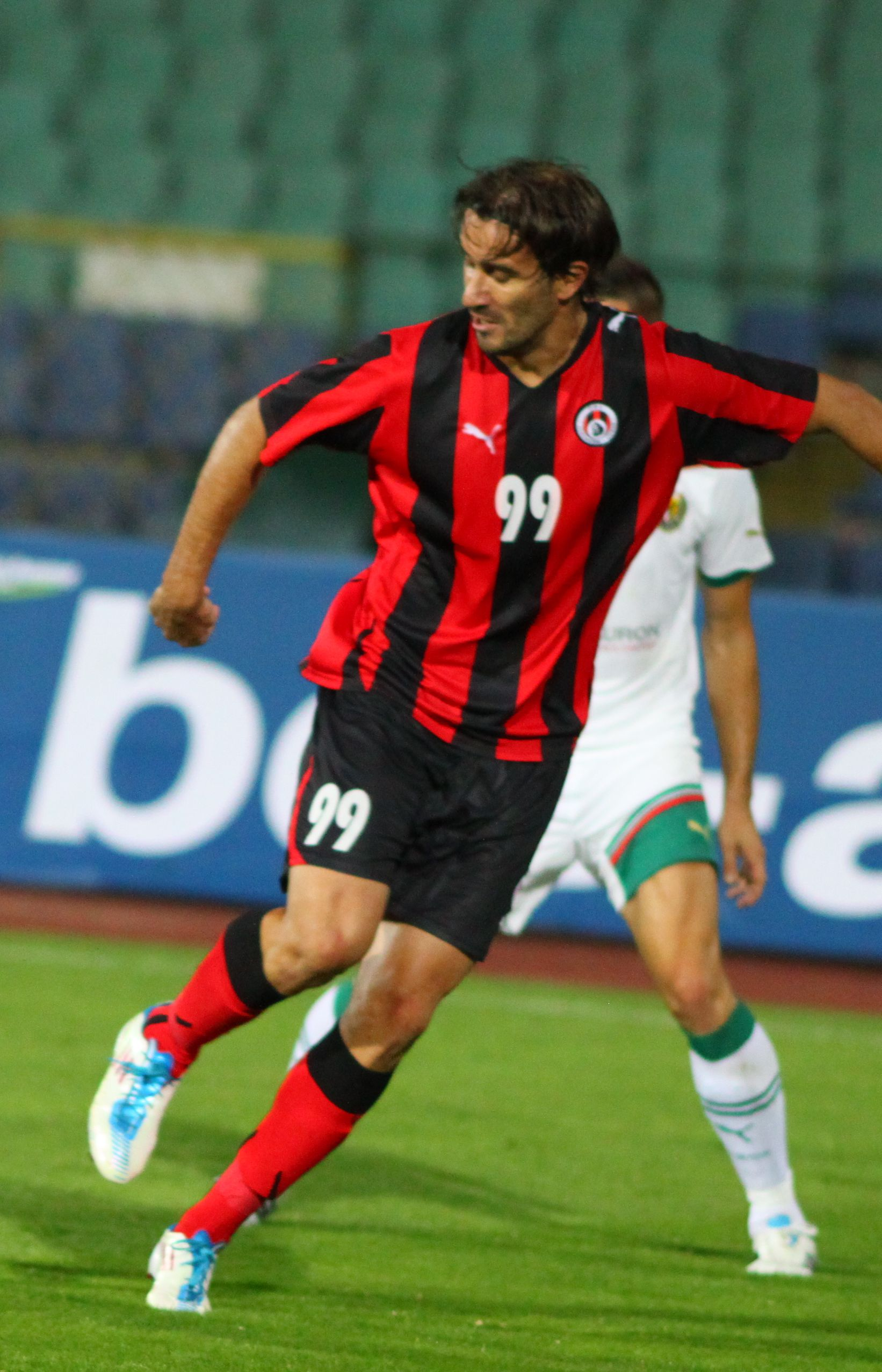

Personal information
- Date of birth: 28 June 1980 (age 46)
- Place of birth: Tuzla, SFR Yugoslavia
- Height: 1.94 m (6 ft 4 in)
- Position: Forward

Senior career*
Years	Team	Apps	(Gls)
1998–1999	Sloboda Tuzla		
1999–2004	Nantes	1	(0)
2001–2002	→ Sarajevo (loan)		(8)
2002–2003	→ Željezničar (loan)		
2003–2004	→ Besançon (loan)	13	(3)
2004–2005	Hajduk Split	3	(0)
2005–2006	Žepče	12	(7)
2006–2007	Posušje	9	(1)
2007	Sarajevo	11	(2)
2008–2009	Sloboda Tuzla	33	(6)
2009–2011	Rudar Velenje	47	(10)
2011–2012	Lokomotiv Sofia	7	(2)
2012	Sloboda Tuzla		
2013	Vinogradar	12	(2)
2014	Radnički Lukavac		
- * Club domestic league appearances and goals

Mirza Mešić (born 28 June 1980) is a Bosnian former professional footballer who played as a forward.

== Career ==
Mešić was born in Tuzla. He played for Sloboda Tuzla, French Nantes and Besançon, (Note: Mirza Mešić – French league stats at LFP – also available in French (archived)) FK Željezničar, Croatian Hajduk Split, NK Žepče, NK Posušje, FK Sarajevo, Slovenian Rudar Velenje and Bulgarian side PFC Lokomotiv Sofia.
