= Zdravko Šaraba =

Bosnian-Herzegovinian footballer

Personal information
- Full name: Zdravko Šaraba
- Date of birth: 15 May 1980 (age 46)
- Place of birth: Trebinje, SFR Yugoslavia
- Height: 1.87 m (6 ft 2 in)
- Position: Left back

Youth career
- 1996–2001: Leotar Trebinje

Senior career*
Years	Team	Apps	(Gls)
2001–2004	Leotar Trebinje	48	(2)
2004–2006	Volyn Lutsk	11	(0)
2006–2007	Sarajevo	20	(1)
2008	Maribor	9	(0)
2008	Sarajevo	10	(0)
2009	Dinamo Minsk	8	(0)
2010	Laktaši	14	(0)
2010–2014	Leotar Trebinje	104	(7)

International career
2008	Bosnia and Herzegovina	1	(0)
- * Club domestic league appearances and goals

Zdravko Šaraba (Serbian Cyrillic: Здравко Шараба; born 15 May 1980) is a Bosnian-Herzegovinian former football defender.

== Club career ==
He won the 2002–03 Premier League of Bosnia and Herzegovina with hometown club FK Leotar Trebinje.

In January 2009 he moved from FK Sarajevo of the Premier League of Bosnia and Herzegovina to Belarusian FC Dinamo Minsk.

== International career ==
He played one match for the Bosnia and Herzegovina national football team, coming on as a second-half substitute for Nikola Mikelini in a November 2008 friendly match away against Slovenia.

== See also ==
- List of NK Maribor players
