= Gregor Mohar =

Slovenian footballer

Personal information
- Full name: Gregor Mohar
- Date of birth: 22 May 1985 (age 41)
- Height: 1.80 m (5 ft 11 in)
- Position: Defender

Youth career
- –2004: Domžale

Senior career*
Years	Team	Apps	(Gls)
2003–2005	Domžale	0	(0)
2005	Šenčur	5	(0)
2006–2007	Livar Ivančna Gorica	49	(0)
2008	Zagorje	12	(0)
2008–2009	Sarajevo	8	(0)
2010-2011	Radomlje	10	(1)
2012	Keflavík ÍF	8	(0)
2010–2014	Radomlje	16	(1)
Total		108	(2)

Managerial career
- 2018–2019: Radomlje (women's)
- * Club domestic league appearances and goals

Gregor Mohar (born 22 May 1985) is a Slovenian retired footballer who played as a defender.
