= Admir Velagić =

Bosnia and Herzegovina footballer

Personal information
- Full name: Admir Velagić
- Date of birth: 19 October 1975 (age 51)
- Place of birth: Mostar, SFR Yugoslavia
- Height: 1.92 m (6 ft 4 in)
- Position: Midfielder

Senior career*
Years	Team	Apps	(Gls)
1998–2012	Velež Mostar	144	(27)
1999–2000	→ CP Mérida (loan)	6	(1)
2004	→ GOŠK Gabela (loan)		
2005	→ Troglav Livno (loan)		

International career
1999-2003	Bosnia and Herzegovina	3	(0)
2001	Bosnia and Herzegovina XI	1	(0)

Managerial career
- FK Turbina Jablanica
- * Club domestic league appearances and goals

Admir Velagić (born 19 October 1975) is a Bosnian-Herzegovinian former professional footballer. He also was a sports director at hometown club Velež Mostar.

== International career ==
He made his debut for Bosnia and Herzegovina in an August 1999 friendly match away against Liechtenstein and has earned a total of 4 (1 unofficial) caps, scoring no goals. His final international was a February 2003 friendly against Wales.
