= Senad Repuh =

Bosnian footballer (born 1972)

Personal information
- Date of birth: 18 November 1972 (age 53)
- Place of birth: Sarajevo, SFR Yugoslavia
- Height: 1.68 m (5 ft 6 in)
- Position: Midfielder

Youth career
- 1980–1990: Sarajevo

Senior career*
Years	Team	Apps	(Gls)
1990–1991	Sarajevo	2	(0)
1995	Lorient	11	(1)
1996–1997	Sarajevo	26	(1)
1997–1998	Karabükspor	26	(8)
1998–2000	Bursaspor	20	(2)
2000	Hapoel Jerusalem	13	(0)
2000–2001	Hapoel Tzafririm Holon	9	(0)
2001	Sarajevo	18	(2)
2001–2002	Sokol Saratov	14	(1)
2002–2004	Sarajevo	48	(6)
2004–2005	Pietà Hotspurs	23	(1)
2005–2008	Sarajevo	59	(5)
2008–2010	SAŠK Napredak	5	(0)
Total		274	(27)

International career
1997–1999	Bosnia and Herzegovina	14	(1)

Managerial career
- 2017: Sarajevo
- 2019–2020: Jedinstvo Bihać
- * Club domestic league appearances and goals

Senad Repuh (born 18 November 1972) is a Bosnian football manager and former player.

== Club career ==
After passing the club's youth selections, Repuh started his professional career with hometown club Sarajevo in the 1990–91 season. With the start of the Bosnian War and the halt of competitive football in the country, many first team regulars left the club as it became a touring one.

In 1996, after being spotted by scouts during one of the aforementioned tours, Repuh joined French Ligue 1 side Lorient, where he stayed for one season before returning to Sarajevo. In 1997, he made a move to the Turkish Süper Lig, joining Karabükspor and eventually Bursaspor.

After a stint in Israel, playing for Hapoel Jerusalem and Hapoel Tzafririm Holon, Repuh again returned to Sarajevo. He went on to play for Sokol Saratov in the Russian Premier League, Pietà Hotspurs in the Maltese Premier League, and lower-tier Bosnian side SAŠK Napredak before retiring from professional football. Repuh had previously won the Bosnian Premier League with Sarajevo in 2007 before retiring.

== International career ==
Repuh earned 14 caps for the Bosnia and Herzegovina national team between 1997 and 1999. He scored his first and only goal at the 1997 Dunhill Cup, in a game in which Bosnia and Herzegovina beat Vietnam 4–0. His final international was a September 1999 European Championship qualification match away against the Czech Republic.

== Managerial career ==
Repuh succeeded Vlado Jagodić as manager of Jedinstvo Bihać in September 2019, only to be released by them in January 2020.

== Career statistics ==
=== International goals ===
Senad Repuh: International goals
No.	Date	Venue	Opponent	Score	Result	Competition
1	22 February 1997	Stadium Merdeka, Kuala Lumpur, Malaysia	Vietnam	4–0	4–0	1997 Dunhill Cup

== Managerial statistics ==
As of 16 November 2019

Managerial record by team and tenure
Team	From	To	Record				
Team	From	To	P	W	D	L	Win %
Sarajevo	30 July 2017	22 August 2017	4	1	1	2	25.00
Jedinstvo Bihać	17 September 2019	9 January 2020	10	4	1	5	40.00
Total			14	5	2	7	35.71

== Honours ==
=== Player ===
Sarajevo

- Bosnian Premier League: 2006–07
