= Bosnalijek =

Bosnian pharmaceutical company

- Official logo
- Company type: Public (SASE: BSNLR)
- Industry: Pharmaceutical
- Founded: 1951; 75 years ago
- Headquarters: Sarajevo, Bosnia and Herzegovina
- Key people: Adnan Hadžić (General director)
- Products: Solid oral form medicines, ampule medicines, galenic products, non-pharmaceutical chemical products
- Revenue: ▲€80.91 million (2018)
- Net income: ▲€6.62 million (2018)
- Total assets: ▲€157.01 million (2018)
- Total equity: ▲€91.00 million (2018)
- Owner: Haden S.A. (25.95%); KBC Euro Credit Capital (23.68%); Economic and Social Development Fund (7.60%); Others
- Number of employees: 720 (2019)
- Website: http://www.bosnalijek.ba/

Bosnalijek is a Bosnian pharmaceutical company headquartered in Sarajevo, Bosnia and Herzegovina. Established in 1951, it is the largest pharmaceutical company in Bosnia and Herzegovina, present in more than 20 markets and having annual revenue of around 80 million euros (as of 2018).

== History ==
Bosnalijek was established in 1951 in Sarajevo, FPR Yugoslavia, present-day Bosnia and Herzegovina.

In 2005, the International Finance Corporation provided Bosnalijek with a €7.5 million loan for the construction of an €18.5 million production and distribution center.

In August 2016, Bosnalijek celebrated its 65-year anniversary. In October 2016, the Government of the Federation of Bosnia and Herzegovina sold its remaining shares in the company in the auction.

As of 2019, Bosnalijek is presented in more than 20 markets, with revenues from foreign markets accounting for 76% of all revenues.
