= Gradski stadion (Laktaši) =

Football stadium in Laktaši, Bosnia and Herzegovina

Gradski Stadion
- Interactive map of Gradski Stadion
- Location: Laktaši, Bosnia and Herzegovina
- Coordinates: 44°54′25″N 17°18′34″E
- Owner: FK Laktaši
- Operator: FK Laktaši
- Capacity: 5,000

Tenant
- FK Laktaši

Gradski Stadion is a football stadium in Laktaši, Bosnia and Herzegovina. It is the home stadium of FK Laktaši of the Premier League of Bosnia and Herzegovina. The stadium holds 5,000 spectators.
