= Samir Duro =

Bosnian footballer (born 1977)

Samir Duro-
Personal information
- Date of birth: 18 October 1977 (age 49)
- Place of birth: Konjic, SFR Yugoslavia
- Height: 1.85 m (6 ft 1 in)
- Position: Midfielder

Youth career
- –1996: Igman Konjic

Senior career*
Years	Team	Apps	(Gls)
1996–1999	Sarajevo		
2001–2002	Maribor	57	(23)
2003	PAS Giannina	8	(2)
2003	Saturn Ramenskoye	7	(0)
2004	→ Željezničar (loan)	14	(0)
2005	Celje	14	(0)
2006	Sarajevo	29	(6)
2006–2007	Međimurje	24	(0)
2008–2009	Sarajevo	14	(2)
2009	Čelik Zenica	12	(0)
2009–2010	Šibenik	11	(1)
2010	Čelik Zenica	22	(3)
2011	Zrinjski Mostar	24	(2)
2012-2013	Rudar Kakanj	36	(3)

International career
1999–2002	Bosnia and Herzegovina	7	(0)
- * Club domestic league appearances and goals

Samir Duro (born 18 October 1977) is a Bosnian retired professional footballer who played as a midfielder.

== Club career ==
Duro previously played for Sarajevo in the Bosnian Premier League and Međimurje in the Croatian Prva HNL.

== International career ==
Duro made his debut for Bosnia and Herzegovina in an October 1999 European Championship qualification match away against Estonia and has earned a total of seven caps. His final international was an August 2002 friendly match against Serbia and Montenegro.
