= Žepče City Stadium =

Stadium in Žepče, Bosnia and Herzegovina

Stadion NK Žepče
- Interactive map of Stadion NK Žepče

Gradski Stadion Žepče is a multi-use stadium in Žepče, Bosnia and Herzegovina. It is currently used mostly for football matches and is the home ground of NK Žepče. The stadium holds 4,000 people.
