= 2006–07 Premier League of Bosnia and Herzegovina =

Premijer Liga
- Season: 2006–07
- Champions: Sarajevo; 1st Premier League title 2nd Bosnian title 4th Domestic title
- Relegated: Borac; Radnik
- Champions League: Sarajevo
- UEFA Cup: Zrinjski; Široki Brijeg
- Intertoto Cup: Slavija
- Matches: 240
- Goals: 661 (2.75 per match)
- Top goalscorer: Stevo Nikolić; Dragan Benić (19 goals)

Statistics of Premier League of Bosnia and Herzegovina in the 2006–2007 season.

== Overview ==
It was contested by 16 teams, and FK Sarajevo won the championship.

== Clubs and stadiums ==
Location of clubs in Premijer Liga 2006-07

Team	Location
Borac	Banja Luka
Čelik	Zenica
Jedinstvo	Bihać
Leotar	Trebinje
Modriča Maxima	Modriča
Orašje	Orašje
Posušje	Posušje
Radnik	Bijeljina
Sarajevo	Sarajevo
Slavija	Istočno Sarajevo
Sloboda	Tuzla
Široki Brijeg	Široki Brijeg
Velež	Mostar
Zrinjski	Mostar
Željezničar	Sarajevo
Žepče Limorad	Žepče

== League standings ==
Pos	Team	Pld	W	D	L	GF	GA	GD	Pts	Qualification or relegation
1	Sarajevo (C)	30	17	6	7	44	26	+18	57	Qualification to Champions League first qualifying round
2	Zrinjski (Note: Zrinjski Mostar 1 point deducted for leaving the field in Round 23 match against Orašje.)	30	17	4	9	69	40	+29	54	Qualification to UEFA Cup first qualifying round
3	Slavija	30	17	2	11	41	35	+6	53	Qualification to Intertoto Cup first round
4	Široki Brijeg	30	13	6	11	39	32	+7	45	Qualification to UEFA Cup first qualifying round (Note: Široki Brijeg won 2006–07 Bosnian Cup and qualified for the first qualifying round of the UEFA Cup.)
5	Modriča	30	13	5	12	43	42	+1	44	
6	Željezničar	30	13	5	12	51	40	+11	44	
7	Jedinstvo Bihać	30	13	4	13	46	57	−11	43	
8	Leotar	30	14	1	15	47	48	−1	43	
9	Velež	30	12	7	11	41	42	−1	43	
10	Sloboda Tuzla	30	12	4	14	36	45	−9	40	
11	Posušje	30	12	4	14	42	51	−9	40	
12	Žepče	30	12	4	14	30	37	−7	40	
13	Orašje	30	11	6	13	39	37	+2	39 (Note: Orašje 2W 0D 2L GD+4; Čelik 2W 0D 2L GD–1; Borac 2W 0D 2L GD–3)	
14	Čelik	30	12	3	15	29	35	−6	39	
15	Borac Banja Luka (R)	30	13	0	17	42	47	−5	39	Relegation to Prva Liga RS
16	Radnik (R)	30	8	1	21	25	50	−25	25	Relegation to Prva Liga RS

Source: RSSSF.org
Rules for classification: 1) points; 2) goal difference; 3) number of goals scored.
(C) Champions; (R) Relegated

== Results ==
Home \ Away	BOR	ČEL	JED	LEO	MOD	ORA	POS	RAD	SAR	SLA	SLO	ŠB	VEL	ZRI	ŽEL	ŽEP
Borac Banja Luka		1–0	5–0	1–0	0–1	1–0	3–0	3–0	2–1	1–2	1–0	2–1	4–1	1–0	2–1	1–2
Čelik	3–0		2–0	3–1	0–1	2–1	1–0	2–0	0–0	1–0	2–0	2–1	3–2	2–1	1–0	0–0
Jedinstvo Bihać	2–0	2–1		3–1	1–1	3–1	2–1	3–2	1–1	1–0	2–0	2–1	2–1	2–2	2–0	1–0
Leotar	3–2	3–2	5–3		2–1	2–0	0–2	1–0	4–0	1–0	3–1	2–1	2–0	3–4	3–0	4–0
Modriča	2–1	1–0	2–1	3–1		1–1	1–1	2–1	3–1	2–1	2–0	1–1	4–0	1–3	4–1	1–0
Orašje	2–0	4–0	5–0	1–0	2–1		4–1	2–0	0–1	2–1	2–2	1–1	1–1	3–0 (Note: The match was suspended after the 84th minute with the score at 3–2 because Zrinjski's players left the field dissatisfied with the referee's decisions. The match was later awarded 3–0 to Orašje.)	1–3	2–0
Posušje	4–1	1–0	4–3	3–0	2–1	2–2		1–0	2–0	3–0	3–2	0–2	3–2	2–2	0–0	4–0
Radnik	1–2	2–0	2–4	0–1	1–0	1–0	1–0		1–0	1–2	2–0	0–1	3–2	2–2	1–2	2–1
Sarajevo	3–1	3–1	2–0	1–0	4–0	2–0	2–1	5–0		1–0	1–1	2–0	2–1	1–0	2–1	2–0
Slavija	3–2	1–0	2–1	3–1	2–1	1–0	2–0	3–1	1–1		2–0	2–0	2–0	2–1	2–1	1–0
Sloboda Tuzla	1–0	1–0	2–1	3–1	2–1	1–2	5–1	3–1	1–0	3–1		2–1	2–0	0–6	2–2	2–1
Široki Brijeg	4–1	2–0	3–1	0–0	1–1	2–0	1–0	2–0	1–0	0–1	0–0		0–0	0–2	2–1	3–1
Velež	4–3	2–1	1–1	2–0	2–1	1–0	3–0	1–0	1–1	1–1	2–0	2–0		2–1	2–0	1–0
Zrinjski	2–0	1–0	7–2	4–3	3–0	4–1	3–0	1–0	1–1	2–1	3–0	2–4	2–1		2–1	5–2
Željezničar	3–1	3–0	3–0	3–0	5–2	0–0	7–1	1–0	0–1	5–2	1–0	3–2	1–1	2–1		1–1
Žepče	1–0	0–0	1–0	2–0	2–0	1–0	1–0	3–0	2–3	2–0	1–0	0–2	2–2	1–0	2–0	

Source: RSSSF.org
Legend: Blue = home team win; Yellow = draw; Red = away team win.

== Top goalscorers ==
Rank	Player	Club	Goals
1	(Bosnia and Herzegovina) Stevo Nikolić	Modriča	19
1	(Bosnia and Herzegovina) Dragan Benić	Borac	19
3	(Bosnia and Herzegovina) Zoran Šešlija	Leotar	14
4	(Senegal) Boubacar Dialiba	Željezničar	11
4	(Bosnia and Herzegovina) Vernes Selimović	Jedinstvo	11
4	(Serbia) Zoran Rajović	Zrinjski	11
7	(Croatia) Mislav Karoglan	Široki Brijeg	10
7	(Bosnia and Herzegovina) Admir Mirvić	Široki Brijeg	10
9	(Brazil) Wagner Santos Lago	Široki Brijeg	9
9	(Croatia) Krešimir Kordić	Zrinjski	9
	(Senegal) Lamine Diarra	Zrinjski	8
	(Bosnia and Herzegovina) Admir Velagić	Velež	8
	(Bosnia and Herzegovina) Alen Mešanović	Posušje	8
	(Bosnia and Herzegovina) Sretko Vuksanović	Slavija	8
