= Damir Hadžić (footballer, born 1978) =

Bosnian-Herzegovina footballer

Personal information
- Full name: Damir Hadžić
- Date of birth: 2 October 1978 (age 48)
- Place of birth: Zenica, SFR Yugoslavia
- Height: 1.80 m (5 ft 11 in)
- Position: Winger

Youth career
- 1989–1997: Žepče

Senior career*
Years	Team	Apps	(Gls)
1998–2002	Žepče	39	(12)
2002–2012	FK Sarajevo	221	(33)
2012–2014	Sloboda Tuzla	28	(4)
2015	Žepče	6	(0)
- * Club domestic league appearances and goals

Damir Hadžić (born 2 October 1978) is a retired Bosnian-Herzegovinian professional footballer who played as a winger and spent most of his career with Bosnian-Herzegovinian Premier League club Sarajevo.
