= NK Žepče =

Žepče 1919
- Full name: Nogometni Klub Žepče 1919
- Founded: 1919; 106 years ago
- Ground: Žepče Gradski Stadion, Žepče
- Capacity: 4,000
- League: Second League of the Federation of Bosnia and Herzegovina
- 2022/23: 10th
Home colours	Away colours

Nogometni Klub Žepče 1919 is a football club from Žepče, Bosnia and Herzegovina.

The home stadium is called Žepče Gradski Stadion (Žepče City Stadium) with a capacity of 4,000. The team plays in the third League Druga Liga Centar. The team's colours are blue and white.

== History ==
Žepče changed their name several times. The team competed the most under the name Orlovik, and recorded the greatest successes as Žepče, playing from 2002 to 2008 in the Premier League of Bosnia and Herzegovina. The team was known as NK Zovko Žepče, until 2003, when Limorad became their primary sponsor. In 2019 Žepče celebrated 100 years of foundation with a friendly match against GNK Dinamo Zagreb.

== Honours ==
=== Domestic ===
==== League ====
- First League of the Federation of Bosnia and Herzegovina:
  - Winners (1): 2001–02

== European record ==
Season	Competition	Round		Club	Home	Away
2005/06	UEFA Cup	1Q	(North Macedonia)	FK Bashkimi	1–1	0–3

== Managerial history ==
- (Croatia) Marijan Zovko (2001–2002)
- (Croatia) Pavao Strugačevac
- (Slovenia) Marin Bloudek
- (Bosnia and Herzegovina) Mario Ćutuk
- (Bosnia and Herzegovina) Nikola Nikić (2005–2007)
- (Bosnia and Herzegovina) Ilija Šainović
- (Bosnia and Herzegovina) Tado Tomas
- (Bosnia and Herzegovina) Goran Brašnić
- (Bosnia and Herzegovina) Damir Hadžić
