= Police Stadium, Trebinje =

Multi-purpose stadium in Trebinje, Bosnia

Stadion Police
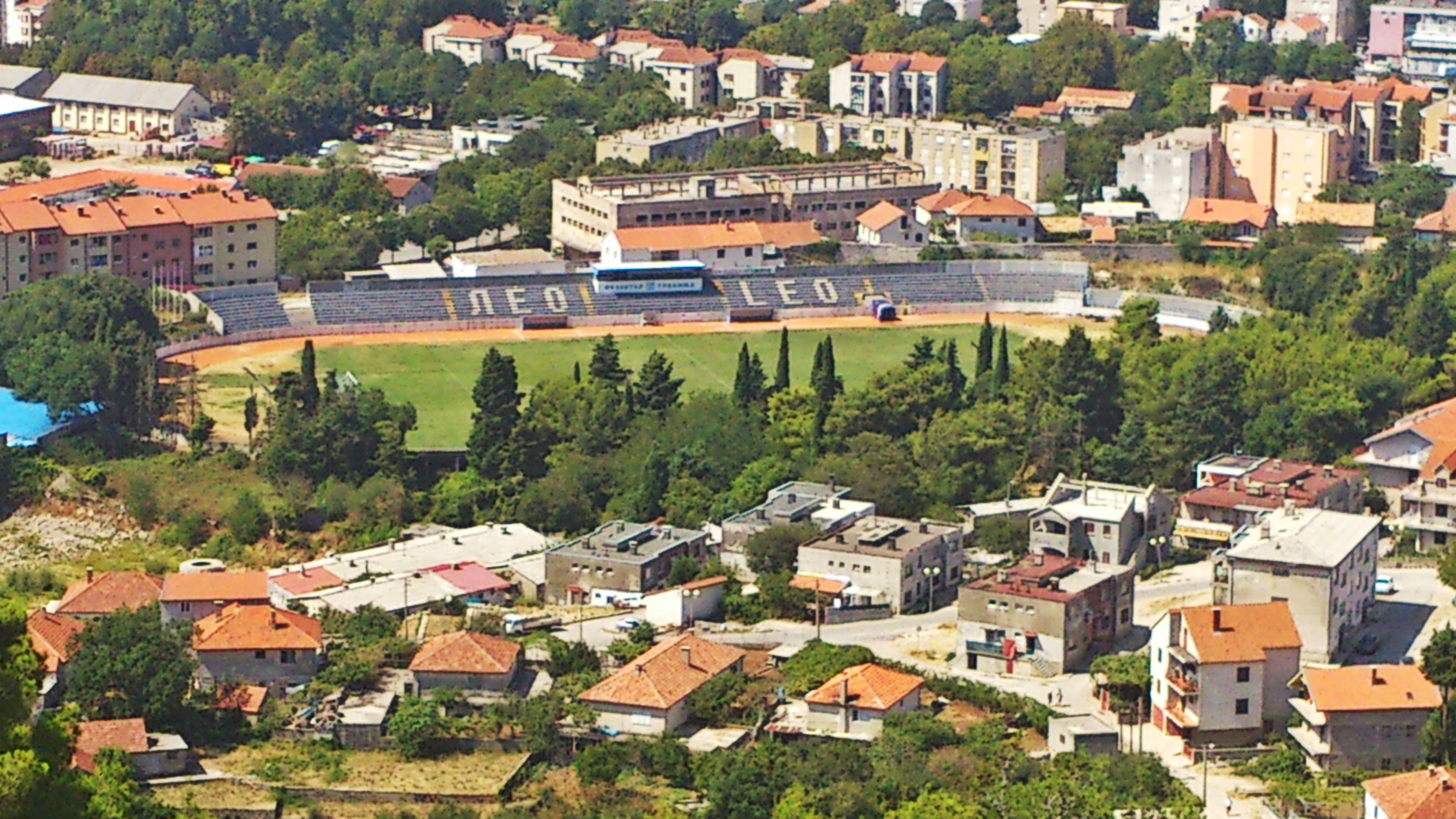
- Interactive map of Stadion Police
- Full name: Police Stadium
- Location: Trebinje, Bosnia and Herzegovina
- Coordinates: 42°42′30.8″N 18°21′17.7″E
- Owner: FK Leotar
- Operator: FK Leotar
- Capacity: 8,550
- Surface: Grass
- Field size: 105 x 69 m

Construction
- Groundbreaking: 1925
- Renovated: 2018

Tenant
- FK Leotar

Stadion Police (Police Stadium) is a multi-purpose stadium in Trebinje, Bosnia and Herzegovina. It is currently used mostly for football matches and is the home ground of FK Leotar. The stadium has a capacity of 8,550.
