= FK Leotar =

Leotar
- Full name: Fudbalski klub Leotar
- Nickname: Tigrovi (The Tigers)
- Founded: 19 August 1925; 101 years ago
- Ground: Police Stadium, Trebinje
- Capacity: 8,550
- Chairman: Slavko Duper
- Manager: Nenad Čerečina-Djidji
- League: First League of RS
- 2025–26: First League of RS, 3rd of 13
- Website: fkleotar.org
Home colours	Away colours

FK Leotar (Serbian Cyrillic: ФК Леотар), commonly known as Leotar Trebinje or simply Leotar, is a professional football club based in the city of Trebinje that is situated in southern Bosnia and Herzegovina. Founded in 1925 and named after the mountain located just north of the city, the club's home ground is the 8,550-seater Stadion Police.

They currently play in the First League of the Republika Srpska, the second-tier competition in Bosnia and Herzegovina.

Founded in 1925, Leotar was a member of the First League of the Republika Srpska after the 1992–95 Bosnian War, winning its final season before integration in the 2001–02 season. In its first season in the Premier League of Bosnia and Herzegovina, Leotar won its only national championship and qualified for the UEFA Champions League.

== History ==
=== Yugoslavia ===
Founded in 1925 in the Kingdom of Serbs, Croats and Slovenes, the club served as a training ground for many players who went on to enjoy notable careers elsewhere. Leotar never managed to gain promotion to the Yugoslav First League.

=== Bosnia and Herzegovina ===
Leotar entered the first-ever season of the First League of Republika Srpska in 1995–96, playing in the Eastern Group and failing to reach the play-offs. In 2001–02, Leotar won the last league championship in the Republika Srpska before the entity's clubs were integrated into a national league. In its first season in the national league in 2002–03, Leotar became the champion of Bosnia and Herzegovina for the only time, denying Željezničar Sarajevo a third consecutive title by gaining 85 points to their 82. The club fell to fourth in the next season.

The following season, Leotar played in the qualification stages for the 2003–04 UEFA Champions League. The club defeated Grevenmacher of Luxembourg in the first qualifying round, but was defeated by Czech club Slavia Prague 1–2 at home and 2–1 away in the second.

== Honours ==
=== Domestic ===
==== League ====
- Premier League of Bosnia and Herzegovina:
  - Winners (1): 2002–03
- First League of the Republika Srpska:
  - Winners (1): 2001–02
  - Runners-up (1): 2020–21
- Second League of the Republika Srpska:
  - Winners (1): 2019–20 (east)

==== Cups ====
- Republika Srpska Cup:
  - Winners (3): 2002, 2004, 2021

== European record ==
=== Summary ===
Competition	Pld	W	D	L	GF	GA	Last season played
UEFA Champions League	4	1	1	2	3	4	2003–04
Total	4	1	1	2	3	4	

Source: uefa.com, Last updated on 5 July 2013
Pld = Matches played; W = Matches won; D = Matches drawn; L = Matches lost; GF = Goals for; GA = Goals against. Defunct competitions indicated in italics.

=== By season ===
Season	Competition	Round	Opponent	Home	Away	Agg.
2003–04	Champions League	QR1	(Luxembourg) Grevenmacher	2–0	0–0	2–0
2003–04	Champions League	QR2	(Czech Republic) Slavia Prague	1–2	0–2	1–4

== Managerial history ==
- (Socialist Federal Republic of Yugoslavia) Žarko Nedeljković
- (Socialist Federal Republic of Yugoslavia) Marcel Žigante (1965–1966)
- (Socialist Federal Republic of Yugoslavia) Ibrahim Muratović
- (Socialist Federal Republic of Yugoslavia) Franjo Džidić (1984–1988)
- (Federal Republic of Yugoslavia) Miodrag Radanović
- (Federal Republic of Yugoslavia) Milan Jovin (2002–2004)
- (Bosnia and Herzegovina) Vladimir Pecelj
- (Montenegro) Brajan Nenezić
- (Montenegro) Srđan Bajić (1 July 2007 – 3 September 2009)
- (Bosnia and Herzegovina) Borče Sredojević (4 September 2009 – 20 January 2010)
- (Serbia) Goran Skakić (21 January 2010 – 3 September 2010)
- (Bosnia and Herzegovina) Vukašin Višnjevac (7 September 2010 – 25 October 2010)
- (Bosnia and Herzegovina) Dragan Spaić (28 October 2010 – 30 June 2011)
- (Bosnia and Herzegovina) Slavko Jović (8 June 2011 – 2 September 2011)
- (Serbia) Bogdan Korak (2 September 2011 – 21 December 2011)
- (Bosnia and Herzegovina) Borče Sredojević (21 December 2011 – 6 July 2012)
- (Bosnia and Herzegovina) Vladimir Gaćinović (9 July 2012 – 6 June 2013)
- (Bosnia and Herzegovina) Dragan Spaić (8 July 2013 – 18 February 2014)
- (Bosnia and Herzegovina) Vladimir Gaćinović (18 February 2014 – 17 March 2014)
- (Croatia) (Bosnia and Herzegovina) Rajko Mičeta (1 July 2014 – 24 March 2019)
- (Bosnia and Herzegovina) Oleg Ćurić (1 July 2019 – 23 June 2021)
- (Bosnia and Herzegovina) Branislav Krunić (23 June 2021 – 13 December 2021)
- (Bosnia and Herzegovina) Miodrag Bodiroga (14 December 2021 – 1 June 2022)
- (Serbia) Marko Vidojević (16 June 2022 – 6 September 2022)
- (Bosnia and Herzegovina) Marko Maksimović (16 September 2022 – 10 July 2023)
- (Bosnia and Herzegovina) Oleg Ćurić (17 July 2023 – 25 April 2024)
- (Serbia) Zoran Šaraba (26 June 2024 – 31 December 2024)
- (Bosnia and Herzegovina) Vlado Jagodić (26 January 2025 – 21 July 2025)
- (Serbia) Davor Berber (21 July 2025 – 3 March 2026)
- (Bosnia and Herzegovina) Velibor Đurić (11 March 2026 – present)
