= 2001–02 FK Sarajevo season =

Sarajevo
2001–02 season
- Chairman: Besim Mehmedić; Salih Delalić
- Manager: Fuad Muzurović; Sead Jesenković
- Stadium: Koševo City Stadium
- Premier League BiH: 4th
- Cup of BiH: Winners
- UEFA Cup: Qualifying round
- Top goalscorer: League: Adnan Osmanhodžić (11); All: Adnan Osmanhodžić (13)
- Highest home attendance: 28,000 vs Željezničar (11 November 2001)
- Average home league attendance: 4,067
- Biggest win: Sarajevo 6–0 Troglav (24 February 2002)
- Biggest defeat: 0–2 (3 games)

The 2001–02 Sarajevo season was the club's 53rd season in history, and their 8th consecutive season in the top flight of Bosnian football, the Premier League of BiH. Besides competing in the Premier League, the team competed in the National Cup and the qualifications for UEFA Cup.

== Squad information ==
=== First-team squad ===
Note: Flags indicate national team as defined under FIFA eligibility rules; some limited exceptions apply. Players may hold more than one non-FIFA nationality.

No.	Pos.	Nation	Player
1	GK	BIH	Mirsad Dedić
3	FW	BIH	Emir Obuća
3	DF	BIH	Damir Mirvić
3	DF	BIH	Ismet Hadžiahmetović
4	DF	BIH	Ervin Uščuplić
4	MF	BIH	Edin Pehlić
5	DF	BIH	Muhidin Zukić (captain)
6	DF	BIH	Mirzet Krupinac
7	FW	BIH	Mirza Mešić
8	MF	BIH	Smajo Mahmutović
9	MF	BIH	Albin Pelak
10	FW	BIH	Nidal Ferhatović
10	MF	BIH	Amar Ferhatović (captain)
10	MF	BIH	Fuad Šašivarević
10	MF	BIH	Adnan Osmanhodžić
13	MF	BIH	Almir Janjoš
15	DF	BIH	Jasmin Milak
16	MF	BIH	Edin Dudo

No.	Pos.	Nation	Player
17	MF	BIH	Ferid Idrizović
18	FW	BIH	Edin Šaranović
18	MF	BIH	Dženan Uščuplić
19	DF	BIH	Mirza Varešanović
19	FW	BIH	Alen Mešanović
21	DF	BIH	Memnun Suljagić
22	GK	BIH	Muhamed Alaim
22	GK	BIH	Ismir Pintol
23	DF	BIH	Džemal Berberović
—	GK	BIH	Enin Bajramović
—	DF	BIH	Nedim Milišić
—	DF	BIH	Edin Suljević
—	MF	BIH	Saša Bajkuša
—	MF	BIH	Vahidin Čahtarević
—	MF	BIH	Muris Gurda
—	MF	BIH	Azrudin Valentić
—	FW	BIH	Omar Pamuk

== Kit ==
Supplier	Sponsor
(England) Umbro (Serbia and Montenegro) NAAI	(Bosnia and Herzegovina) S (Bosnia and Herzegovina) AurA

== Competitions ==
=== Overview ===
Competition	First match	Last match	Starting round	Final position	Record							
Competition	First match	Last match	Starting round	Final position	Pld	W	D	L	GF	GA	GD	Win %
Premier League	5 August 2001	25 May 2002	Matchday 1	4th	30	13	8	9	50	34	+16	43.33
Cup of BiH	28 November 2001	29 May 2002	First round	Winners	9	7	2	0	22	1	+21	77.78
UEFA Cup	9 August 2001	23 August 2001	Qualifying round	Qualifying round	2	0	0	2	0	2	−2	0.00
Total					41	20	10	11	72	37	+35	48.78

Source: Competitions

=== Premier League ===
==== League table ====
Pos	Team	Pld	W	D	L	GF	GA	GD	Pts	Qualification or relegation
2	Široki Brijeg	30	14	9	7	43	24	+19	51	Qualification to UEFA Cup qualifying round
3	Brotnjo	30	14	5	11	45	27	+18	47	Qualification to Intertoto Cup first round
4	Sarajevo	30	13	8	9	50	34	+16	47	Qualification to UEFA Cup qualifying round (Note: Sarajevo won 2001–02 Bosnian Cup and qualified for the qualifying round of the UEFA Cup.)
5	Zrinjski	30	13	7	10	35	39	−4	46	
6	Čelik	30	12	7	11	39	30	+9	43	

Source: RSSSF.org
Rules for classification: 1) points; 2) goal difference; 3) number of goals scored.

==== Results summary ====
Overall								Home						Away					
Pld	W	D	L	GF	GA	GD	Pts	W	D	L	GF	GA	GD	W	D	L	GF	GA	GD
30	13	8	9	50	34	+16	47	12	3	0	42	15	+27	1	5	9	8	19	−11

Source: Sportsport.ba

==== Results by round ====
Round	1	2	3	4	5	6	7	8	9	10	11	12	13	14	15	16	17	18	19	20	21	22	23	24	25	26	27	28	29	30
Ground	A	H	A	H	A	A	H	A	H	A	H	A	H	A	H	H	A	H	A	H	H	A	H	A	H	A	H	A	H	A
Result	D	W	L	W	L	W	D	L	W	D	W	D	D	L	W	W	L	W	L	W	W	D	D	L	W	L	W	L	W	D
Position	10	3	8	6	9	6	6	7	5	4	4	4	5	5	5	3	4	3	5	4	3	3	3	4	3	3	3	3	4	4

Source: Competitions
A = Away; H = Home; W = Win; D = Draw; L = Loss

==== Matches ====
5 August 2001 1	Grude	0–0	Sarajevo	Grude
		Report		Stadium: Elić Luka Stadium; Attendance: 2,500

8.2001. 2.	FK Sarajevo	0:0; Abandoned	FK Sloboda Tuzla	Sarajevo
				Stadium: Koševo City Stadium

26 August 2001 4	Sarajevo	1–0	Troglav	Sarajevo
		Report		Stadium: Koševo City Stadium; Attendance: 3,000

9 September 2001 5	Posušje	2–1	Sarajevo	Posušje
		Report		Stadium: Mokri Dolac Stadium; Attendance: 1,000

12 September 2001 2	Sarajevo	2–1	Sloboda	Sarajevo
		Report		Stadium: Koševo City Stadium; Attendance: 1,500

15 September 2001 6	Olimpik	0–1	Sarajevo	Sarajevo
		Report		Stadium: Stadion Otoka; Attendance: 2,200

19 September 2001 3	Orašje	2–1	Sarajevo	Orašje
		Report		Stadium: Orašje City Stadium; Attendance: 2,000

22 September 2001 7	Sarajevo	2–2	Zrinjski	Sarajevo
		Report		Stadium: Koševo City Stadium; Attendance: 2,000

29 September 2001 8	Čelik	2–0	Sarajevo	Zenica
		Report		Stadium: Bilino Polje Stadium; Attendance: 8,000

13 October 2001 9	Sarajevo	2–0	Brotnjo	Sarajevo
		Report		Stadium: Koševo City Stadium; Attendance: 3,000

21 October 2001 10	Jedinstvo	0–0	Sarajevo	Bihać
		Report		Stadium: Stadion pod Borićima; Attendance: 2,000

27 October 2001 11	Sarajevo	6–1	Bosna	Sarajevo
		Report		Stadium: Koševo City Stadium; Attendance: 3,000

4 November 2001 12	Široki Brijeg	0–0	Sarajevo	Široki Brijeg
		Report		Stadium: Stadion Pecara; Attendance: 3,000

11 November 2001 13	Sarajevo	2–2	Željezničar	Sarajevo
		Report		Stadium: Koševo City Stadium; Attendance: 28,000

17 November 2001 14	Velež	1–0	Sarajevo	Mostar
		Report		Stadium: Vrapčići Stadium; Attendance: 1,500

5 December 2001 15	Sarajevo	4–1	Iskra	Sarajevo
		Report		Stadium: Koševo City Stadium; Attendance: 1,000

2 March 2002 16	Sarajevo	3–1	Grude	Sarajevo
		Report		Stadium: Koševo City Stadium; Attendance: 3,000

9 March 2002 17	Sloboda	2–0	Sarajevo	Tuzla
		Report		Stadium: Tušanj City Stadium; Attendance: 4,000

16 March 2002 18	Sarajevo	3–0	Orašje	Sarajevo
		Report		Stadium: Koševo City Stadium; Attendance: 3,000

24 March 2002 19	Troglav	2–1	Sarajevo	Livno
		Report		Stadium: Zgona Stadium; Attendance: 500

30 March 2002 20	Sarajevo	2–1	Posušje	Sarajevo
		Report		Stadium: Koševo City Stadium; Attendance: 3,000

6 April 2002 21	Sarajevo	4–0	Olimpik	Sarajevo
		Report		Stadium: Koševo City Stadium; Attendance: 1,500

14 April 2002 22	Zrinjski	1–1	Sarajevo	Mostar
		Report		Stadium: Bijeli Brijeg Stadium; Attendance: 3,000

20 April 2002 23	Sarajevo	2–2	Čelik	Sarajevo
		Report		Stadium: Koševo City Stadium; Attendance: 3,000

24 April 2002 24	Brotnjo	2–0	Sarajevo	Čitluk
		Report		Stadium: Bare Stadium; Attendance: 1,000

27 April 2002 25	Sarajevo	3–1	Jedinstvo	Sarajevo
		Report		Stadium: Koševo City Stadium; Attendance: 1,000

4 May 2002 26	Bosna	2–1	Sarajevo	Visoko
		Report		Stadium: Luke Stadium; Attendance: 2,000

8 May 2002 27	Sarajevo	2–1	Široki Brijeg	Sarajevo
		Report		Stadium: Koševo City Stadium; Attendance: 3,000

11 May 2002 28	Željezničar	1–0	Sarajevo	Sarajevo
		Report		Stadium: Stadion Grbavica; Attendance: 20,000

18 May 2002 29	Sarajevo	4–2	Velež	Sarajevo
		Report		Stadium: Koševo City Stadium; Attendance: 2,000

25 May 2002 30	Iskra	2–2	Sarajevo	Bugojno
		Report		Stadium: Stadion Jaklić

=== Cup of Bosnia and Herzegovina ===
==== Round of 32 ====
28 November 2001 First leg	Sarajevo	3–0	Sloboda Bosanski Novi	Sarajevo
		Report		Stadium: Koševo City Stadium

2 December 2001 Second leg	Sloboda Bosanski Novi	0–3 (0–6 agg.)	Sarajevo	Bosanski Novi
		Report		Stadium: Mlakve Stadium

==== Round of 16 ====
24 February 2002 First leg	Sarajevo	6–0	Troglav Livno	Sarajevo
		Report		Stadium: Koševo City Stadium; Attendance: 1,000

27 February 2002 Second leg	Troglav Livno	0–3 (0–9 agg.)	Sarajevo	Livno
		Report		Stadium: Zgona Stadium; Attendance: 300

==== Quarter-finals ====
13 March 2002 First leg	Sarajevo	4–0	Brotnjo	Sarajevo
		Report		Stadium: Koševo City Stadium; Attendance: 4,000

20 March 2002 Second leg	Brotnjo	0–0 (0–4 agg.)	Sarajevo	Čitluk
		Report		Stadium: Bare Stadium; Attendance: 1,000

==== Semi-finals ====
10 April 2002 First leg	Sarajevo	1–0	Čelik Zenica	Sarajevo
		Report		Stadium: Koševo City Stadium; Attendance: 2,500

30 April 2002 Second leg	Čelik	0–0 (0–1 agg.)	Sarajevo	Zenica
		Report		Stadium: Bilino Polje Stadium; Attendance: 17,000

==== Final ====
29 May 2002	Sarajevo	2–1	Željezničar	Sarajevo
	Zukić 10'; Osmanhodžić 90+4'	Report	Gredić 90'	Stadium: Koševo City Stadium; Attendance: 20,000; Referee: Sead Kulović (Sarajevo)

=== UEFA Cup ===
==== Qualifying round ====
9 August 2001 First leg	Marítimo (Portugal)	1–0	(Bosnia and Herzegovina) Sarajevo	Funchal, Portugal
21:00 WEST (UTC+1)	Dinda 5'; Sérgio (yellow card) 44'; Van der Gaag (yellow card) 64'	Report	Berberović (yellow card) 20'; Pelak (yellow card) 61'; Suljagić (yellow card) 77'; Pintol (yellow card) 84'	Stadium: Estádio dos Barreiros; Attendance: 9,000; Referee: Stéphane Moulin (France)

23 August 2001 Second leg	Sarajevo (Bosnia and Herzegovina)	0–1 (0–2 agg.)	(Portugal) Marítimo	Sarajevo, Bosnia and Herzegovina
20:30 CEST (UTC+2)	Hadžiahmetović (yellow card) 43'; Mešić (yellow card) 90'	Report	Kenedy (yellow card) 3'; Neles (yellow card) 87'; Fernandes 90'	Stadium: Koševo City Stadium; Attendance: 23,000; Referee: Stefan Meßner (Austria)
