= 2002–03 FK Sarajevo season =

Sarajevo
2002–03 season
- Chairman: Salih Delalić; Faruk Hadžibegić
- Manager: Husref Musemić
- Stadium: Koševo City Stadium
- Premier League BiH: 3rd
- Cup of BiH: Quarter-finals
- UEFA Cup: First round
- Top goalscorer: League: Emir Obuća (24); All: Emir Obuća (29)
- Highest home attendance: 27,500 vs Beşiktaş (3 October 2002)
- Lowest home attendance: 300 vs Bosna (26 April 2003)
- Average home league attendance: 5,580
- Biggest win: Sarajevo 7–1 Troglav (20 November 2002)
- Biggest defeat: Sarajevo 0–5 Beşiktaş (3 October 2002)

The 2002–03 Sarajevo season was the club's 54th season in history, and their 9th consecutive season in the top flight of Bosnian football, the Premier League of BiH. Besides competing in the Premier League, the team competed in the National Cup and the UEFA Cup.

== Squad information ==
=== First-team squad ===
Note: Flags indicate national team as defined under FIFA eligibility rules; some limited exceptions apply. Players may hold more than one non-FIFA nationality.

No.	Pos.	Nation	Player
1	GK	BIH	Ismir Pintol
1 22	GK	BIH	Muhamed Alaim
2	FW	BIH	Džemo Smječanin (Vice-captain)
3	DF	BIH	Damir Mirvić
4	MF	BIH	Alen Bašić
5	DF	BIH	Muhidin Zukić (captain)
6	DF	BIH	Mirzet Krupinac
13 6	DF	BIH	Safet Nadarević
7	MF	BIH	Faruk Ihtijarević
7 14	MF	BIH	Veldin Muharemović
8	MF	BIH	Slobo Novaković
8	FW	BIH	Ensar Arifović
9	FW	BIH	Nidal Ferhatović
9	MF	BIH	Albin Pelak
10	MF	BIH	Adnan Osmanhodžić
11 8	MF	BIH	Senad Repuh
11	FW	BIH	Emir Obuća
13	MF	BIH	Almir Janjoš
14	MF	BIH	Aldin Janjoš
14	FW	BIH	Sead Zilić

No.	Pos.	Nation	Player
15	MF	BIH	Muamer Kurto
15	DF	BIH	Jasmin Milak
16	MF	BIH	Edin Dudo
17	MF	BIH	Ferid Idrizović
8 18	MF	BIH	Smajo Mahmutović
18	FW	BIH	Edin Šaranović
19	FW	BIH	Nedim Hiroš
20 6	DF	BIH	Tarik Cerić
21 7	FW	BIH	Alen Škoro
22	GK	BIH	Alen Krak
23	DF	BIH	Džemal Berberović
24 19 10 14	MF	BIH	Edin Pehlić
24	DF	BIH	Almir Alić
—	GK	BIH	Adnan Gušo
—	GK	BIH	Mirsad Dedić
—	GK	BIH	Elvis Karić
—	DF	BIH	Adnan Elezović
—	DF	BIH	Sead Kapetanović
—	DF	BIH	Nedim Milišić
—	DF	BIH	Edin Suljević

== Kit ==
Supplier	Sponsor
(United Kingdom) (England) Umbro (Serbia and Montenegro) NAAI (Italy) Lotto	(Bosnia and Herzegovina) AurA

== Competitions ==
=== Overview ===
Competition	First match	Last match	Starting round	Final position	Record							
Competition	First match	Last match	Starting round	Final position	Pld	W	D	L	GF	GA	GD	Win %
Premier League	3 August 2002	24 May 2003	Matchday 1	3rd	38	19	12	7	83	39	+44	50.00
Cup of BiH	6 November 2002	5 March 2003	First round	Quarter-finals	6	4	2	0	20	3	+17	66.67
UEFA Cup	15 August 2002	3 October 2002	Qualifying round	First round	4	1	1	2	5	10	−5	25.00
Total					48	24	15	9	108	52	+56	50.00

Source: Competitions

=== Premier League ===
==== League table ====
Pos	Team	Pld	W	D	L	GF	GA	GD	Pts	Qualification or relegation
1	Leotar (C)	38	26	7	5	82	27	+55	85	Qualification to Champions League first qualifying round
2	Željezničar	38	24	10	4	66	24	+42	82	Qualification to UEFA Cup qualifying round
3	Sarajevo	38	19	12	7	83	39	+44	69	Qualification to UEFA Cup qualifying round
4	Široki Brijeg	38	21	5	12	69	45	+24	68	
5	Čelik	38	16	10	12	61	33	+28	58	

Source: RSSSF.org
Rules for classification: 1) points; 2) goal difference; 3) number of goals scored.
(C) Champions

==== Results summary ====
Overall								Home						Away					
Pld	W	D	L	GF	GA	GD	Pts	W	D	L	GF	GA	GD	W	D	L	GF	GA	GD
38	19	12	7	83	39	+44	69	15	4	0	60	13	+47	4	8	7	23	26	−3

Source: Sportsport.ba

==== Results by round ====
Round	1	2	3	4	5	6	7	8	9	10	11	12	13	14	15	16	17	18	19	20	21	22	23	24	25	26	27	28	29	30	31	32	33	34	35	36	37	38
Ground	H	A	H	A	H	A	H	A	H	A	H	A	H	A	H	A	H	H	A	A	H	A	H	A	H	A	H	A	H	A	H	A	H	A	H	A	A	H
Result	W	L	W	D	W	L	W	D	D	D	W	W	W	L	W	D	W	W	W	L	W	L	D	D	W	D	D	L	D	D	W	D	W	L	W	W	W	W
Position	2	8	2	4	1	6	4	6	6	6	4	4	2	3	3	3	2	2	2	3	3	3	3	4	3	3	3	4	4	4	3	4	4	4	4	4	3	3

Source: Competitions
A = Away; H = Home; W = Win; D = Draw; L = Loss

==== Matches ====
3 August 2002 1	Sarajevo	4–0	Posušje	Sarajevo
		Report		Stadium: Koševo City Stadium; Attendance: 3,000

10 August 2002 2	Orašje	2–0	Sarajevo	Orašje
		Report		Stadium: Orašje City Stadium; Attendance: 2,500

18 August 2002 3	Sarajevo	5–1	Brotnjo	Sarajevo
		Report		Stadium: Koševo City Stadium; Attendance: 4,500

24 August 2002 4	Budućnost	1–1	Sarajevo	Banovići
		Report		Stadium: Banovići City Stadium; Attendance: 3,500

1 September 2002 5	Sarajevo	2–0	Sloboda	Sarajevo
		Report		Stadium: Koševo City Stadium; Attendance: 5,000

11 September 2002 6	Leotar	3–2	Sarajevo	Trebinje
		Report		Stadium: Police Stadium; Attendance: 2,500

14 September 2002 7	Sarajevo	3–0	Borac	Sarajevo
		Report		Stadium: Koševo City Stadium; Attendance: 3,500

22 September 2002 8	Željezničar	1–1	Sarajevo	Sarajevo
		Report		Stadium: Stadion Grbavica; Attendance: 18,000

25 September 2002 9	Sarajevo	4–4	Široki Brijeg	Sarajevo
		Report		Stadium: Koševo City Stadium; Attendance: 3,000

29 September 2002 10	Zovko Žepče	0–0	Sarajevo	Žepče
		Report		Stadium: Žepče City Stadium; Attendance: 2,500

6 October 2002 11	Sarajevo	4–2	Rudar	Sarajevo
		Report		Stadium: Koševo City Stadium; Attendance: 3,000

19 October 2002 12	Bosna	2–3	Sarajevo	Visoko
		Report		Stadium: Luke Stadium; Attendance: 2,000

23 October 2002 13	Sarajevo	3–1	Čelik	Sarajevo
		Report		Stadium: Koševo City Stadium; Attendance: 6,000

27 October 2002 14	Glasinac	2–1	Sarajevo	Sokolac
		Report		Stadium: Bare Stadium; Attendance: 1,200

30 October 2002 15	Sarajevo	4–0	Mladost	Sarajevo
		Report		Stadium: Koševo City Stadium; Attendance: 3,000

2 November 2002 16	Kozara	1–1	Sarajevo	Gradiška
		Report		Stadium: Gradiška City Stadium; Attendance: 3,000

9 November 2002 17	Sarajevo	3–1	Velež	Sarajevo
		Report		Stadium: Koševo City Stadium; Attendance: 2,000

16 November 2002 18	Sarajevo	6–1	Zrinjski	Sarajevo
		Report		Stadium: Koševo City Stadium; Attendance: 2,500

23 November 2002 19	Jedinstvo	1–5	Sarajevo	Bihać
		Report		Stadium: Stadion pod Borićima; Attendance: 4,000

23 February 2003 20	Posušje	3–0	Sarajevo	Posušje
		Report		Stadium: Mokri Dolac Stadium; Attendance: 2,200

1 March 2003 21	Sarajevo	3–0	Orašje	Sarajevo
		Report		Stadium: Koševo City Stadium; Attendance: 4,500

9 March 2003 22	Brotnjo	2–1	Sarajevo	Čitluk
		Report		Stadium: Bare Stadium; Attendance: 4,000

12 March 2003 23	Sarajevo	0–0	Budućnost	Sarajevo
		Report		Stadium: Koševo City Stadium; Attendance: 500

15 March 2003 24	Sloboda	1–1	Sarajevo	Tuzla
		Report		Stadium: Tušanj City Stadium; Attendance: 4,000

23 March 2003 25	Sarajevo	2–0	Leotar	Sarajevo
		Report		Stadium: Koševo City Stadium; Attendance: 7,000

5 April 2003 26	Borac	0–0	Sarajevo	Banja Luka
		Report		Stadium: Banja Luka City Stadium; Attendance: 4,000

13 April 2003 27	Sarajevo	1–1	Željezničar	Sarajevo
		Report		Stadium: Koševo City Stadium; Attendance: 27,000

16 April 2003 28	Široki Brijeg	3–0	Sarajevo	Široki Brijeg
		Report		Stadium: Stadion Pecara; Attendance: 3,000

19 April 2003 29	Sarajevo	0–0	Zovko Žepče	Sarajevo
		Report		Stadium: Koševo City Stadium; Attendance: 1,000

23 April 2003 30	Rudar	1–1	Sarajevo	Ugljevik
		Report		Stadium: Ugljevik City Stadium; Attendance: 1,000

26 April 2003 31	Sarajevo	5–0	Bosna	Sarajevo
		Report		Stadium: Koševo City Stadium; Attendance: 300

30 April 2003 32	Čelik	1–1	Sarajevo	Zenica
		Report		Stadium: Bilino Polje Stadium; Attendance: 10,000

4 May 2003 33	Sarajevo	2–0	Glasinac	Sarajevo
		Report		Stadium: Koševo City Stadium; Attendance: 1,000

7 May 2003 34	Mladost	1–0	Sarajevo	Gacko
		Report		Stadium: Gacko City Stadium; Attendance: 100

11 May 2003 35	Sarajevo	6–2	Kozara	Sarajevo
		Report		Stadium: Koševo City Stadium; Attendance: 400

17 May 2003 36	Velež	1–3	Sarajevo	Mostar
		Report		Stadium: Vrapčići Stadium; Attendance: 3,000

21 May 2003 37	Zrinjski	0–2	Sarajevo	Mostar
		Report		Stadium: Bijeli Brijeg Stadium; Attendance: 1,500

24 May 2003 38	Sarajevo	3–0	Jedinstvo	Sarajevo
		Report		Stadium: Koševo City Stadium; Attendance: 6,500

=== Cup of Bosnia and Herzegovina ===
==== Round of 32 ====
6 November 2002 First leg	Troglav Livno	0–4	Sarajevo	Livno
		Report		Stadium: Zgona Stadium; Attendance: 100

20 November 2002 Second leg	Sarajevo	7–1 (11–1 agg.)	Troglav Livno	Sarajevo
		Report		Stadium: Koševo City Stadium; Attendance: 500

==== Round of 16 ====
27 November 2002 First leg	Sarajevo	4–0	Rudar Ugljevik	Sarajevo
		Report		Stadium: Koševo City Stadium; Attendance: 4,000

30 November 2002 Second leg	Rudar Ugljevik	0–3 (0–7 agg.)	Sarajevo	Ugljevik
		Report		Stadium: Novi Gradski Stadium

==== Quarter-finals ====
15 February 2003 First leg	Sarajevo	1–1	Zovko Žepče	Sarajevo
		Report		Stadium: Koševo City Stadium; Attendance: 3,000

5 March 2003 Second leg	Zovko Žepče	1–1 (a.e.t.) (2–2 agg.) (4–3 p)	Sarajevo	Žepče
		Report		Stadium: Žepče City Stadium; Attendance: 2,000

=== UEFA Cup ===
==== Qualifying round ====
15 August 2003 First leg	Sigma Olomouc (Czech Republic)	2–1	(Bosnia and Herzegovina) Sarajevo	Olomouc, Czech Republic
20:00 CEST (UTC+2)	Putík 45'; Ekwueme 75'	Report	Osmanhodžić 30'; Berberović (yellow card) 46'; Zukić (yellow card) 53'	Stadium: Andrův stadion Attendance: 5,378; Referee: Karen Nalbandyan (Armenia)

29 August 2003 Second leg	Sarajevo (Bosnia and Herzegovina)	2–1 (a.e.t.) (3–3 agg.) (5–3 p)	(Czech Republic) Sigma Olomouc	Sarajevo, Bosnia and Herzegovina
20:30 CEST (UTC+2)	Berberović (yellow card) 34'; Obuća 53'; Osmanhodžić 78'; Zukić (yellow card) 88'	Report	Putík 10'; Caha (yellow card) 31'; Krajčovič (yellow card) 90'	Stadium: Koševo City Stadium; Attendance: 9,800; Referee: Aleksey Tyumin (Russia)
	Penalties
	Pelak (penalty scored); Osmanhodžić (penalty scored); Kurto (penalty scored); Ihtijarević (penalty scored); Krupinac (penalty scored)		(penalty missed) Caha; (penalty scored) Urbánek; (penalty scored) Reiter; (penalty scored) Rozehnal

==== First round ====
19 September 2002 First leg	Beşiktaş (Turkey)	2–2	(Bosnia and Herzegovina) Sarajevo	Istanbul, Turkey
18:45 EEST (UTC+3)	Pancu 31'; Dursun 33'; Sülün (yellow card) 68'	Report	Zukić (yellow card) 12'; Obuća 63'; Osmanhodžić 79'; Krupinac (yellow card) 80'	Stadium: BJK İnönü Stadium; Attendance: 21,732; Referee: Philippe Leuba (Switzerland)

3 October 2002 Second leg	Sarajevo (Bosnia and Herzegovina)	0–5 (2–7 agg.)	(Turkey) Beşiktaş	Sarajevo, Bosnia and Herzegovina
19:00 CEST (UTC+2)	Berberović (yellow card) 43'; Alaim (yellow card) 71'	Report	Pancu 5'; Üzülmez 43'; Dursun (yellow card) 22', (goal) 72' (pen.); Sülün 84'; Ali Cansun 85'	Stadium: Koševo City Stadium; Attendance: 27,500; Referee: Attila Juhos (Hungary)
