= 2004–05 FK Sarajevo season =

Sarajevo
2004–05 season
- Sporting director: Mirza Varešanović
- Chairman: Nijaz Gracić; Savo Vlaški
- Manager: Kemal Alispahić; Edin Prljača; Husref Musemić
- Stadium: Asim Ferhatović Hase Stadium
- Premier League BiH: 4th
- Cup of BiH: Winners
- Top goalscorer: League: Emir Obuća (7); All: Emir Obuća (12)
- Highest home attendance: 13,000 vs Široki Brijeg (17 May 2005)
- Lowest home attendance: 250 vs Rudar (24 November 2004)
- Average home league attendance: 2,837
- Biggest win: Sarajevo 4–1 Borac (20 October 2004); Sarajevo 4–1 Čelik (2 April 2005)
- Biggest defeat: Orašje 5–3 Sarajevo (28 May 2005)

The 2004–05 Sarajevo season was the club's 56th season in history, and their 11th consecutive season in the top flight of Bosnian football, the Premier League of BiH. Besides competing in the Premier League, the team competed in the National Cup.

== Squad information ==
=== First-team squad ===
Note: Flags indicate national team as defined under FIFA eligibility rules; some limited exceptions apply. Players may hold more than one non-FIFA nationality.

No.	Pos.	Nation	Player
12 1	GK	SCG	Vojislav Dragović
2	DF	BIH	Almir Alić
3	DF	BIH	Damir Mirvić
3	DF	BIH	Elvis Imširović
4	MF	BIH	Ajdin Maksumić
4 13	MF	SCG	Fuad Salihović
5	DF	BIH	Muhidin Zukić (4th captain)
6	DF	BIH	Darko Raca
7	MF	BIH	Faruk Ihtijarević
8	FW	BIH	Enes Mešanović
8 18	MF	BIH	Veldin Muharemović
9	MF	BIH	Mirnel Sadović
9	MF	BIH	Albin Pelak (5th captain)
10	MF	BIH	Adnan Osmanhodžić (3rd captain)
11	FW	BIH	Emir Obuća
12	GK	BIH	Elvis Karić
13	DF	BIH	Safet Nadarević

No.	Pos.	Nation	Player
14	MF	BIH	Muhamed Džakmić
17	FW	BIH	Samir Šarić
18	FW	BIH	Adis Kapetanović
19	MF	BIH	Edin Pehlić
20	MF	BIH	Amar Ferhatović
21	MF	BIH	Adi Kapetanović
22	GK	BIH	Muhamed Alaim (Vice-captain)
23	DF	BIH	Džemal Berberović (captain)
25 15	MF	BIH	Damir Hadžić
29	FW	BIH	Alen Avdić
—	MF	BIH	Ferid Idrizović
—	MF	BIH	Eldar Mašić
—	MF	BIH	Emir Janjoš
—	FW	BIH	Feđa Dudić
—	FW	SCG	Predrag Stoiljković
—	FW	BIH	Jasmin Šuntić

== Kit ==
Supplier	Sponsor
(Italy) Lotto (Italy) Legea	(Bosnia and Herzegovina) AurA

== Competitions ==
=== Overview ===
Competition	First match	Last match	Starting round	Final position	Record							
Competition	First match	Last match	Starting round	Final position	Pld	W	D	L	GF	GA	GD	Win %
Premier League	8 August 2004	28 May 2005	Matchday 1	4th	30	13	6	11	39	37	+2	43.33
Cup of BiH	22 September 2004	17 May 2005	First round	Winners	9	6	2	1	17	7	+10	66.67
Total					39	19	8	12	56	44	+12	48.72

Source: Competitions

=== Premier League ===
==== League table ====
Pos	Team	Pld	W	D	L	GF	GA	GD	Pts	Qualification or relegation
2	Željezničar	30	15	6	9	31	22	+9	51	Ineligible for 2005–06 European competitions (Note: Originally UEFA Cup qualifiers were league runner-up and Cup winner, but due to UEFA licensing, qualifiers were allocated to teams which fulfill the criteria.)
3	Široki Brijeg	30	12	9	9	42	33	+9	45	Qualification to UEFA Cup first qualifying round
4	Sarajevo	30	13	6	11	39	37	+2	45	Ineligible for 2005–06 European competitions
5	Travnik	30	14	2	14	42	47	−5	44	
6	Modriča	30	11	9	10	38	32	+6	42	

Source: RSSSF.org
Rules for classification: 1) points; 2) goal difference; 3) number of goals scored.

==== Results summary ====
Overall								Home						Away					
Pld	W	D	L	GF	GA	GD	Pts	W	D	L	GF	GA	GD	W	D	L	GF	GA	GD
30	13	6	11	39	37	+2	45	11	1	3	30	16	+14	2	5	8	9	21	−12

Source: Sportsport.ba

==== Results by round ====
Round	1	2	3	4	5	6	7	8	9	10	11	12	13	14	15	16	17	18	19	20	21	22	23	24	25	26	27	28	29	30
Ground	A	H	A	A	H	A	H	A	H	A	H	A	H	A	H	H	A	H	H	A	H	A	H	A	H	A	H	A	H	A
Result	L	W	D	L	L	L	W	W	W	D	L	L	W	L	W	L	L	W	W	D	W	L	W	D	D	D	W	W	W	L
Position	14	11	9	12	15	16	14	10	8	8	11	12	11	11	10	13	13	11	11	11	8	11	8	7	9	8	6	4	3	4

Source: Competitions
A = Away; H = Home; W = Win; D = Draw; L = Loss

==== Matches ====
8 August 2004 1	Zrinjski	2–0	Sarajevo	Mostar
		Report		Stadium: Stadion pod Bijelim Brijegom; Attendance: 8,000

14 August 2004 2	Sarajevo	1–0	Leotar	Sarajevo
		Report		Stadium: Asim Ferhatović Hase Stadium; Attendance: 6,000

22 August 2004 3	Slavija	0–0	Sarajevo	Istočno Sarajevo
		Report		Stadium: City Stadium SRC Slavija; Attendance: 7,000

28 August 2004 4	Čelik	2–1	Sarajevo	Zenica
		Report		Stadium: Bilino Polje Stadium; Attendance: 13,000

12 September 2004 5	Sarajevo	2–4	Travnik	Sarajevo
		Report		Stadium: Asim Ferhatović Hase Stadium; Attendance: 2,500

18 September 2004 6	Budućnost	3–0	Sarajevo	Banovići
		Report		Stadium: Stadion FK Budućnost; Attendance: 3,000

25 September 2004 7	Sarajevo	2–1	Posušje	Sarajevo
		Report		Stadium: Asim Ferhatović Hase Stadium; Attendance: 1,500

3 October 2004 8	Žepče Limorad	0–1	Sarajevo	Žepče
		Report		Stadium: Žepče City Stadium; Attendance: 1,000

16 October 2004 9	Sarajevo	2–0	Sloboda	Sarajevo
		Report		Stadium: Asim Ferhatović Hase Stadium; Attendance: 1,500

23 October 2004 10	Modriča Maxima	0–0	Sarajevo	Modriča
		Report		Stadium: Modriča City Stadium; Attendance: 1,000

30 October 2004 11	Sarajevo	0–1	Željezničar	Sarajevo
		Report		Stadium: Asim Ferhatović Hase Stadium; Attendance: 9,000

6 November 2004 12	Borac	3–0	Sarajevo	Banja Luka
		Report		Stadium: Banja Luka City Stadium; Attendance: 5,000

21 November 2004 14	Široki Brijeg	2–0	Sarajevo	Široki Brijeg
		Report		Stadium: Pecara Stadium; Attendance: 1,000

24 November 2004 13	Sarajevo	2–1	Rudar	Sarajevo
		Report		Stadium: Asim Ferhatović Hase Stadium; Attendance: 250

27 November 2004 15	Sarajevo	3–1	Orašje	Sarajevo
		Report		Stadium: Asim Ferhatović Hase Stadium; Attendance: 300

10 March 2005 16	Sarajevo	2–3	Zrinjski	Sarajevo
		Report		Stadium: Asim Ferhatović Hase Stadium; Attendance: 3,000

13 March 2005 17	Leotar	1–0	Sarajevo	Trebinje
		Report		Stadium: Police Stadium; Attendance: 1,000

19 March 2005 18	Sarajevo	2–0	Slavija	Sarajevo
		Report		Stadium: Asim Ferhatović Hase Stadium; Attendance: 3,500

2 April 2005 19	Sarajevo	4–1	Čelik	Sarajevo
		Report		Stadium: Asim Ferhatović Hase Stadium; Attendance: 6,000

9 April 2005 20	Travnik	0–0	Sarajevo	Travnik
		Report		Stadium: Pirota Stadium; Attendance: 1,000

16 April 2005 21	Sarajevo	3–0	Budućnost	Sarajevo
		Report		Stadium: Asim Ferhatović Hase Stadium; Attendance: 2,500

20 April 2005 22	Posušje	1–0	Sarajevo	Posušje
		Report		Stadium: Mokri Dolac Stadium; Attendance: 400

23 April 2005 23	Sarajevo	2–1	Žepče Limorad	Sarajevo
		Report		Stadium: Asim Ferhatović Hase Stadium; Attendance: 2,000

27 April 2005 24	Sloboda	1–1	Sarajevo	Tuzla
		Report		Stadium: Tušanj City Stadium; Attendance: 5,000

30 April 2005 25	Sarajevo	0–0	Modriča Maxima	Sarajevo
		Report		Stadium: Asim Ferhatović Hase Stadium; Attendance: 1,500

4 May 2005 26	Željezničar	1–1	Sarajevo	Sarajevo
		Report		Stadium: Grbavica Stadium; Attendance: 12,000

7 May 2005 27	Sarajevo	2–1	Borac	Sarajevo
		Report		Stadium: Asim Ferhatović Hase Stadium; Attendance: 1,500

14 May 2005 28	Rudar	0–2	Sarajevo	Ugljevik
		Report		Stadium: Novi Gradski Stadion; Attendance: 300

21 May 2005 29	Sarajevo	3–2	Široki Brijeg	Sarajevo
		Report		Stadium: Asim Ferhatović Hase Stadium; Attendance: 1,500

28 May 2005 30	Orašje	5–3	Sarajevo	Orašje
		Report		Stadium: Orašje City Stadium; Attendance: 1,500

=== Cup of Bosnia and Herzegovina ===
==== Round of 32 ====
22 September 2004	Famos Hrasnica	1–3	Sarajevo	Hrasnica
		Report		Stadium: Hrasnica Stadium; Attendance: 2,000

==== Round of 16 ====
13 October 2004	Borac	2–1	Sarajevo	Banja Luka
		Report		Stadium: Banja Luka City Stadium; Attendance: 1,500

20 October 2004	Sarajevo	4–1 (5–3 agg.)	Borac	Sarajevo
		Report		Stadium: Asim Ferhatović Hase Stadium; Attendance: 1,200

==== Quarter-finals ====
27 October 2004	Sarajevo	1–1	Orašje	Sarajevo
		Report		Stadium: Asim Ferhatović Hase Stadium; Attendance: 2,000

10 November 2004	Orašje	0–1 (1–2 agg.)	Sarajevo	Orašje
		Report		Stadium: Orašje City Stadium; Attendance: 1,000

==== Semi-finals ====
6 April 2005	Slavija	0–2	Sarajevo	Istočno Sarajevo
		Report	Zukić 27'; Obuća 76'	Stadium: City Stadium SRC Slavija; Attendance: 5,000

13 April 2005	Sarajevo	3–1 (5–1 agg.)	Slavija	Sarajevo
		Report		Stadium: Asim Ferhatović Hase Stadium; Attendance: 1,000

==== Final ====
11 May 2005	Široki Brijeg	0–1	Sarajevo	Široki Brijeg
		Report	Obuća 10'	Stadium: Pecara Stadium; Attendance: 2,000

17 May 2005	Sarajevo	1–1 (2–1 agg.)	Široki Brijeg	Sarajevo
	Obuća 42'	Report	Juričić 66'	Stadium: Asim Ferhatović Hase Stadium; Attendance: 13,000
