= 2003–04 FK Sarajevo season =

Sarajevo
2003–04 season
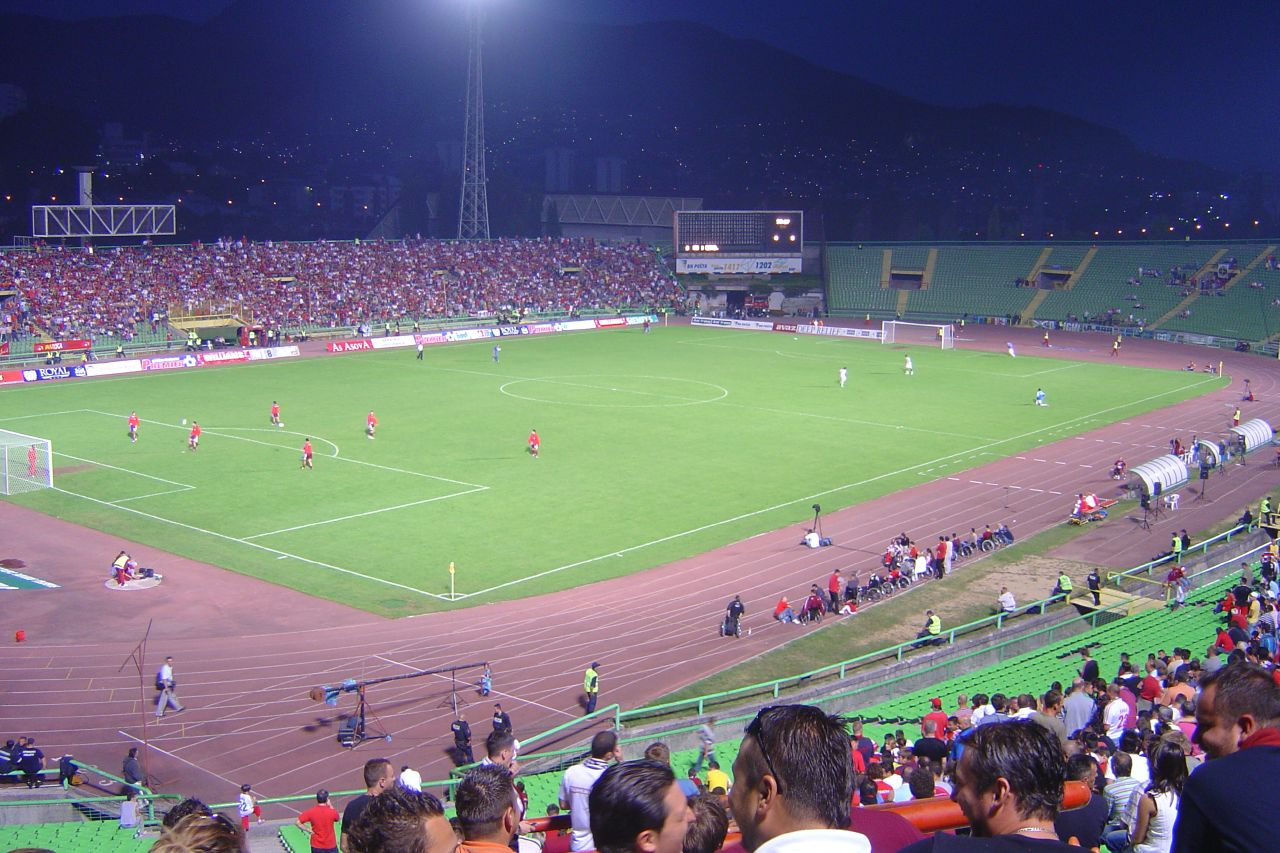
- 12.8.2003. FK Sarajevo : FK Sartid 1:1
- Chairman: Faruk Hadžibegić; Nijaz Gracić
- Manager: Husref Musemić; Agim Nikolić
- Stadium: Koševo City Stadium
- Premier League BiH: 3rd
- Cup of BiH: Round of 32
- UEFA Cup: Qualifying round
- Top goalscorer: League: Alen Škoro (20); All: Alen Škoro (20)
- Highest home attendance: 25,000 vs Sartid (12 August 2003)
- Lowest home attendance: 1,000 vs Modriča Maxima (8 November 2003); 1,000 vs Borac (8 May 2004)
- Average home league attendance: 4,933
- Biggest win: Sarajevo 5–0 Travnik (8 August 2003); Sarajevo 5–0 Modriča Maxima (8 November 2003)
- Biggest defeat: Leotar 4–1 Sarajevo (10 March 2004)

The 2003–04 Sarajevo season was the club's 55th season in history, and their 10th consecutive season in the top flight of Bosnian football, the Premier League of BiH. Besides competing in the Premier League, the team competed in the National Cup and the qualifications for UEFA Cup.

== Squad information ==
=== First-team squad ===
Note: Flags indicate national team as defined under FIFA eligibility rules; some limited exceptions apply. Players may hold more than one non-FIFA nationality.

No.	Pos.	Nation	Player
2	DF	BIH	Almir Alić
3	DF	BIH	Damir Mirvić
4	DF	BIH	Ervin Uščuplić
4	MF	BIH	Ajdin Maksumić
4	MF	BIH	Alen Bašić
5	DF	BIH	Muhidin Zukić (Vice-captain)
6	DF	BIH	Mirzet Krupinac (3rd captain)
7	MF	BIH	Faruk Ihtijarević
8	MF	BIH	Veldin Muharemović
8	MF	BIH	Emir Janjoš
9	FW	BIH	Alen Avdić
10	MF	BIH	Adnan Osmanhodžić
11	MF	BIH	Senad Repuh
12	GK	BIH	Elvis Karić
13	DF	BIH	Safet Nadarević

No.	Pos.	Nation	Player
14	MF	BIH	Muhamed Džakmić
14	MF	BIH	Aldin Janjoš
16	MF	BIH	Edin Dudo
16	MF	SCG	Nenad Zečević
17	MF	BIH	Ferid Idrizović
18	FW	BIH	Nidal Ferhatović
19	MF	BIH	Edin Pehlić
20	MF	BIH	Albin Pelak
20	FW	BIH	Nedim Hiroš
21	FW	BIH	Alen Škoro
22	GK	BIH	Muhamed Alaim (captain)
23	MF	BIH	Mirzet Alagić
—	DF	BIH	Džemal Berberović
—	DF	CRO	Ivan Knezović

== Kit ==
Supplier	Sponsor
(Italy) Lotto	(Bosnia and Herzegovina) AurA

== Competitions ==
=== Overview ===
Competition	First match	Last match	Starting round	Final position	Record							
Competition	First match	Last match	Starting round	Final position	Pld	W	D	L	GF	GA	GD	Win %
Premier League	2 August 2003	29 May 2004	Matchday 1	3rd	30	17	5	8	58	25	+33	56.67
Cup of BiH	17 September 2003	17 September 2003	First round	First round	1	0	0	1	1	2	−1	0.00
UEFA Cup	12 August 2003	28 August 2003	Qualifying round	Qualifying round	2	0	1	1	1	4	−3	0.00
Total					33	17	6	10	60	31	+29	51.52

Source: Competitions

=== Premier League ===
==== League table ====
Pos	Team	Pld	W	D	L	GF	GA	GD	Pts	Qualification or relegation
1	Široki Brijeg (C)	30	19	4	7	58	32	+26	61	Qualification to Champions League first qualifying round
2	Željezničar	30	18	5	7	67	35	+32	59	Qualification to UEFA Cup first qualifying round
3	Sarajevo	30	17	5	8	58	25	+33	56	
4	Leotar	30	17	5	8	46	23	+23	56	
5	Sloboda Tuzla	30	11	9	10	38	36	+2	42	Qualification to Intertoto Cup first round

Source: RSSSF.org
Rules for classification: 1) points; 2) goal difference; 3) number of goals scored.
(C) Champions

==== Results summary ====
Overall								Home						Away					
Pld	W	D	L	GF	GA	GD	Pts	W	D	L	GF	GA	GD	W	D	L	GF	GA	GD
30	17	5	8	58	25	+33	56	13	1	1	41	6	+35	4	4	7	17	19	−2

Source: Sportsport.ba

==== Results by round ====
Round	1	2	3	4	5	6	7	8	9	10	11	12	13	14	15	16	17	18	19	20	21	22	23	24	25	26	27	28	29	30
Ground	H	H	A	H	A	H	A	H	A	H	A	H	A	H	A	A	A	H	A	H	A	H	A	H	A	H	A	H	A	H
Result	W	W	W	L	D	W	D	W	D	D	L	W	D	W	L	L	W	W	W	W	L	W	W	W	L	W	L	W	L	W
Position	1	1	1	1	3	1	1	1	1	3	4	4	3	3	3	4	4	3	3	3	3	3	2	2	2	2	2	2	3	3

Source: Competitions
A = Away; H = Home; W = Win; D = Draw; L = Loss

==== Matches ====
2 August 2003 1	Sarajevo	3–0	Leotar	Sarajevo
		Report		Stadium: Koševo City Stadium; Attendance: 10,000

8 August 2003 2	Sarajevo	5–0	Travnik	Sarajevo
		Report		Stadium: Koševo City Stadium; Attendance: 8,500

17 August 2003 3	Glasinac	0–3	Sarajevo	Sokolac
		Report		Stadium: Bare Stadium; Attendance: 2,000

23 August 2003 4	Sarajevo	0–1	Orašje	Sarajevo
		Report		Stadium: Koševo City Stadium; Attendance: 7,000

31 August 2003 5	Rudar	0–0	Sarajevo	Ugljevik
		Report		Stadium: Ugljevik City Stadium; Attendance: 2,000

13 September 2003 6	Sarajevo	1–0	Zrinjski	Sarajevo
		Report		Stadium: Koševo City Stadium; Attendance: 2,500

21 September 2003 7	Žepče Limorad	0–0	Sarajevo	Žepče
		Report		Stadium: Žepče City Stadium; Attendance: 3,500

27 September 2003 8	Sarajevo	2–0	Brotnjo	Sarajevo
		Report		Stadium: Koševo City Stadium; Attendance: 3,500

1 October 2003 9	Sloboda	2–2	Sarajevo	Tuzla
		Report		Stadium: Tušanj City Stadium; Attendance: 5,000

5 October 2003 10	Sarajevo	1–1	Željezničar	Sarajevo
		Report		Stadium: Koševo City Stadium; Attendance: 20,000

18 October 2003 11	Borac	3–2	Sarajevo	Banja Luka
		Report		Stadium: Banja Luka City Stadium; Attendance: 4,500

25 October 2003 12	Sarajevo	4–1	Široki Brijeg	Sarajevo
		Report		Stadium: Koševo City Stadium; Attendance: 2,500

1 November 2003 13	Čelik	1–1	Sarajevo	Zenica
		Report		Stadium: Bilino Polje Stadium; Attendance: 6,000

8 November 2003 14	Sarajevo	5–0	Modriča Maxima	Sarajevo
		Report		Stadium: Koševo City Stadium; Attendance: 1,000

16 November 2003 15	Posušje	1–0	Sarajevo	Posušje
		Report		Stadium: Mokri Dolac Stadium; Attendance: 3,000

2004. 16.	FK Leotar	0:1; Abandoned	FK Sarajevo	Trebinje
			9 Alen Avdić	Stadium: Police Stadium

6 March 2004 17	Travnik	0–2	Sarajevo	Travnik
		Report		Stadium: Pirota Stadium; Attendance: 5,000

10 March 2004 16	Leotar	4–1	Sarajevo	Trebinje
		Report		Stadium: Police Stadium; Attendance: 3,500

14 March 2004 18	Sarajevo	3–0	Glasinac	Sarajevo
		Report		Stadium: Koševo City Stadium; Attendance: 5,000

20 March 2004 19	Orašje	0–1	Sarajevo	Orašje
		Report		Stadium: Orašje City Stadium; Attendance: 3,000

27 March 2004 20	Sarajevo	1–0	Rudar	Sarajevo
		Report		Stadium: Koševo City Stadium; Attendance: 3,000

4 April 2004 21	Zrinjski	2–1	Sarajevo	Mostar
		Report		Stadium: Bijeli Brijeg Stadium; Attendance: 5,000

14 April 2004 22	Sarajevo	3–0	Žepče Limorad	Sarajevo
		Report		Stadium: Koševo City Stadium; Attendance: 2,000

18 April 2004 23	Brotnjo	0–2	Sarajevo	Čitluk
		Report		Stadium: Bare Stadium; Attendance: 600

24 April 2004 24	Sarajevo	3–0	Sloboda	Sarajevo
		Report		Stadium: Koševo City Stadium; Attendance: 2,500

30 April 2004 25	Željezničar	2–1	Sarajevo	Sarajevo
		Report		Stadium: Stadion Grbavica; Attendance: 16,000

8 May 2004 26	Sarajevo	3–1	Borac	Sarajevo
		Report		Stadium: Koševo City Stadium; Attendance: 1,000

12 May 2004 27	Široki Brijeg	1–0	Sarajevo	Široki Brijeg
		Report		Stadium: Stadion Pecara; Attendance: 4,000

15 May 2004 28	Sarajevo	3–2	Čelik	Sarajevo
		Report		Stadium: Koševo City Stadium; Attendance: 3,000

22 May 2004 29	Modriča Maxima	3–1	Sarajevo	Modriča
		Report		Stadium: Maxima Stadium; Attendance: 800

29 May 2004 30	Sarajevo	4–0	Posušje	Sarajevo
		Report		Stadium: Koševo City Stadium; Attendance: 2,500

=== Cup of Bosnia and Herzegovina ===
==== Round of 32 ====
17 September 2003	Drinovci	2–1	Sarajevo	Drinovci
		Report		Stadium: Boljava Stadium; Attendance: 1,500

=== UEFA Cup ===
==== Qualifying round ====
12 August 2003 First leg	Sarajevo (Bosnia and Herzegovina)	1–1	(Serbia and Montenegro) Sartid	Sarajevo, Bosnia and Herzegovina
21:00 CEST (UTC+2)	Zukić (yellow card) 39'; Mirvić (yellow card) 80'; Kovačević 83' (o.g.)	Report	Mirosavljević 5'; Paunović (yellow card) 45'; Mudrinić (yellow card) 89'	Stadium: Koševo City Stadium; Attendance: 25,000; Referee: Damien Ledentu (France)

28 August 2003 Second leg	Sartid (Serbia and Montenegro)	3–0 (4–1 agg.)	(Bosnia and Herzegovina) Sarajevo	Smederevo, Serbia and Montenegro
16:00 CEST (UTC+2)	Kovačević (yellow card) 15'; Pantelić 30' (pen.); Zečević 65'; Mudrinić 89'	Report	Krupinac (yellow card) 56'; Alić (red card) 88'	Stadium: Sartid Stadium; Attendance: 10,000; Referee: Vitaliy Hodulian (Ukraine)
