= 2000–01 FK Sarajevo season =

Sarajevo
2000–01 season
- Chairman: Besim Mehmedić
- Manager: Denijal Pirić; Husref Musemić
- Stadium: Koševo City Stadium
- Premier League BiH: 3rd
- Cup of BiH: Runners-up
- Top goalscorer: League: Edin Tahirović (13); All: Edin Tahirović (14)
- Highest home attendance: 29,000 vs Željezničar (28 April 2001)
- Lowest home attendance: 400 vs Olimpik (9 June 2001)
- Average home league attendance: 4,543
- Biggest win: Sarajevo 8–0 Krajina (26 May 2001)
- Biggest defeat: Sarajevo 0–3 Željezničar (28 April 2001)

The 2000–01 Sarajevo season was the club's 52nd season in history, and their 7th consecutive season in the top flight of Bosnian football, the Premier League of BiH. Besides competing in the Premier League, the team competed in the National Cup.

== Squad information ==
=== First-team squad ===
Note: Flags indicate national team as defined under FIFA eligibility rules; some limited exceptions apply. Players may hold more than one non-FIFA nationality.

No.	Pos.	Nation	Player
22 1	GK	BIH	Ismir Pintol
2	DF	BIH	Samid Suljić
8 3	DF	BIH	Izudin Kamberović
3 4	DF	BIH	Ervin Uščuplić
4	MF	BIH	Samir Duro
5	DF	BIH	Muhidin Zukić
6	DF	BIH	Mirzet Krupinac
7	MF	BIH	Senad Repuh
8	MF	BIH	Smajo Mahmutović
8	MF	BIH	Adnan Osmanhodžić
9	MF	BIH	Albin Pelak
10	MF	BIH	Amar Ferhatović (captain)
11	MF	BIH	Nermin Gogalić
7 11	FW	BIH	Edin Šaranović
11	FW	BIH	Alen Mešanović
12	GK	BIH	Muhamed Alaim
13	FW	BIH	Ajdin Hadžihasanović
14	MF	BIH	Fuad Šašivarević

No.	Pos.	Nation	Player
15	DF	BIH	Džemal Berberović
16	FW	YUG	Edin Tahirović
17	DF	BIH	Jasmin Milak
17	DF	BIH	Adnan Fočić
18	DF	BIH	Edin Dudo
18	FW	BIH	Nidal Ferhatović
21	DF	BIH	Memnun Suljagić
—	GK	BIH	Almir Hurtić
—	DF	BIH	Rusmir Kadrić
—	DF	BIH	Mirza Selimović
—	MF	BIH	Dženan Uščuplić
—	MF	BIH	Anes Čardaklija
—	MF	BIH	Ferid Idrizović
—	MF	BIH	Aldin Janjoš
—	MF	MKD	Robert Ristovski
—	MF	BIH	Azrudin Valentić
—	FW	BIH	Amir Saračević
—	FW	BIH	Zlatko Sarajlić

== Kit ==
Supplier	Sponsor	
(England) Umbro	(Bosnia and Herzegovina) S, (Bosnia and Herzegovina) ASA (Bosnia and Herzegovina) VEDRINA/AurA	Front
(England) Umbro	(Bosnia and Herzegovina) Sarabon	Sleeves

== Competitions ==
=== Overview ===
Competition	First match	Last match	Starting round	Final position	Record							
Competition	First match	Last match	Starting round	Final position	Pld	W	D	L	GF	GA	GD	Win %
Premier League	6 August 2000	13 June 2001	Matchday 1	3rd	42	24	9	9	81	35	+46	57.14
Cup of BiH	2 December 2000	15 June 2001	First round	Runners-up	10	5	3	2	17	6	+11	50.00
Total					52	29	12	11	98	41	+57	55.77

Source: Competitions

=== Premier League ===
==== League table ====
Pos	Team	Pld	W	D	L	GF	GA	GD	Pts	Qualification or relegation
1	Željezničar (C)	42	28	7	7	113	38	+75	91	Qualification to Champions League first qualifying round
2	Brotnjo	42	26	6	10	83	25	+58	84	Qualification to UEFA Cup qualifying round
3	Sarajevo	42	24	9	9	81	35	+46	81	Qualification to UEFA Cup qualifying round
4	Čelik	42	21	10	11	75	40	+35	73	Qualification to Intertoto Cup first round
5	Velež	42	22	3	17	87	54	+33	69	

Source: RSSSF.org
Rules for classification: 1) points; 2) goal difference; 3) number of goals scored.
(C) Champions

==== Results summary ====
Overall								Home						Away					
Pld	W	D	L	GF	GA	GD	Pts	W	D	L	GF	GA	GD	W	D	L	GF	GA	GD
42	24	9	9	81	35	+46	81	18	0	3	53	14	+39	6	9	6	28	21	+7

Source: Sportsport.ba

==== Results by round ====
Round	1	2	3	4	5	6	7	8	9	10	11	12	13	14	15	16	17	18	19	20	21	22	23	24	25	26	27	28	29	30	31	32	33	34	35	36	37	38	39	40	41	42
Ground	A	A	H	A	H	A	H	A	H	A	H	A	H	A	H	A	H	A	H	A	H	H	H	A	H	A	H	A	H	A	H	A	H	A	H	A	H	A	H	A	H	A
Result	D	L	W	D	W	D	W	D	W	W	W	L	W	D	W	L	W	W	W	D	W	W	W	W	W	W	W	D	W	D	L	W	L	D	W	L	W	L	W	L	L	W
Position	9	17	10	13	8	10	8	8	4	4	2	5	3	4	3	4	3	3	3	3	3	3	2	2	1	1	1	1	1	1	2	2	3	3	3	3	3	3	3	3	3	3

Source: Competitions
A = Away; H = Home; W = Win; D = Draw; L = Loss

==== Matches ====
6 August 2000 1	Orašje	1–1	Sarajevo	Orašje
		Report		Stadium: Orašje City Stadium; Attendance: 2,000

10 August 2000 2	Brotnjo	1–0	Sarajevo	Čitluk
		Report		Stadium: Bare Stadium; Attendance: 3,500

19 August 2000 3	Sarajevo	3–0	Budućnost	Sarajevo
		Report		Stadium: Koševo City Stadium; Attendance: 4,000

23 August 2000 4	Rudar	1–1	Sarajevo	Kakanj
		Report		Stadium: Pod Vardom Stadium; Attendance: 2,000

6 September 2000 5	Sarajevo	5–2	Čapljina	Sarajevo
		Report		Stadium: Koševo City Stadium; Attendance: 2,500

10 September 2000 6	Posušje	2–2	Sarajevo	Posušje
		Report		Stadium: Mokri Dolac Stadium; Attendance: 2,000

17 September 2000 7	Sarajevo	2–0	Zrinjski	Sarajevo
		Report		Stadium: Koševo City Stadium; Attendance: 2,500

24 September 2000 8	Jedinstvo	1–1	Sarajevo	Bihać
		Report		Stadium: Stadion pod Borićima; Attendance: 7,000

27 September 2000 9	Sarajevo	2–0	Iskra	Sarajevo
		Report		Stadium: Koševo City Stadium; Attendance: 3,000

1 October 2000 10	Troglav	2–4	Sarajevo	Livno
		Report		Stadium: Zgona Stadium; Attendance: 1,000

4 October 2000 11	Sarajevo	2–1	Čelik	Sarajevo
		Report		Stadium: Koševo City Stadium; Attendance: 3,500

15 October 2000 12	Željezničar	1–0	Sarajevo	Sarajevo
		Report		Stadium: Stadion Grbavica; Attendance: 18,000

18 October 2000 13	Sarajevo	2–0	Sloboda	Sarajevo
		Report		Stadium: Koševo City Stadium; Attendance: 1,500

22 October 2000 14	Ljubuški	1–1	Sarajevo	Ljubuški
		Report		Stadium: Babovac Stadium; Attendance: 400

25 October 2000 15	Sarajevo	3–0	Kiseljak	Sarajevo
		Report		Stadium: Koševo City Stadium; Attendance: 3,000

29 October 2000 16	Široki Brijeg	2–0	Sarajevo	Široki Brijeg
		Report		Stadium: Stadion Pecara; Attendance: 4,000

4 November 2000 17	Sarajevo	4–1	Velež	Sarajevo
		Report		Stadium: Koševo City Stadium; Attendance: 2,000

8 November 2000 18	Krajina	0–3	Sarajevo	Cazin
		Report		Stadium: Cazin City Stadium; Attendance: 1,500

18 November 2000 19	Sarajevo	3–0	Travnik	Sarajevo
		Report		Stadium: Koševo City Stadium; Attendance: 2,000

26 November 2000 20	Olimpik	1–1	Sarajevo	Sarajevo
		Report		Stadium: Stadion Otoka; Attendance: 4,000

29 November 2000 21	Sarajevo	8–1	Đerzelez-Zenica	Sarajevo
		Report		Stadium: Koševo City Stadium; Attendance: 1,500

24 February 2001 22	Sarajevo	2–0	Orašje	Sarajevo
		Report		Stadium: Koševo City Stadium; Attendance: 4,500

3 March 2001 23	Sarajevo	1–0	Brotnjo	Sarajevo
		Report		Stadium: Koševo City Stadium; Attendance: 12,000

7 March 2001 24	Budućnost	1–2	Sarajevo	Banovići
		Report		Stadium: Banovići City Stadium; Attendance: 3,000

10 March 2001 25	Sarajevo	1–0	Rudar	Sarajevo
		Report		Stadium: Koševo City Stadium; Attendance: 5,000

17 March 2001 26	Čapljina	0–3	Sarajevo	Čapljina
		Report		Stadium: Bjelave Stadium; Attendance: 1,000

20 March 2001 27	Sarajevo	1–0	Posušje	Sarajevo
		Report		Stadium: Koševo City Stadium; Attendance: 5,000

31 March 2001 28	Zrinjski	2–2	Sarajevo	Mostar
		Report		Stadium: Bijeli Brijeg Stadium; Attendance: 4,000

7 April 2001 29	Sarajevo	2–1	Jedinstvo	Sarajevo
		Report		Stadium: Koševo City Stadium; Attendance: 6,000

11 April 2001 30	Iskra	0–0	Sarajevo	Bugojno
		Report		Stadium: Stadion Jaklić; Attendance: 4,000

18 April 2001 31	Sarajevo	1–3	Troglav	Sarajevo
		Report		Stadium: Koševo City Stadium; Attendance: 3,000

21 April 2001 32	Čelik	0–3	Sarajevo	Zenica
		Report		Stadium: Bilino Polje Stadium; Attendance: 12,000

28 April 2001 33	Sarajevo	0–3	Željezničar	Sarajevo
		Report		Stadium: Koševo City Stadium; Attendance: 29,000; Referee: Spomenko Mandić

2 May 2001 34	Sloboda	0–0	Sarajevo	Tuzla
		Report		Stadium: Tušanj City Stadium; Attendance: 6,000

5 May 2001 35	Sarajevo	1–0	Ljubuški	Sarajevo
		Report		Stadium: Koševo City Stadium; Attendance: 1,000

13 May 2001 36	Kiseljak	2–1	Sarajevo	Kiseljak
		Report		Stadium: Croatian Defenders Stadium; Attendance: 4,000

16 May 2001 37	Sarajevo	2–0	Široki Brijeg	Sarajevo
		Report		Stadium: Koševo City Stadium; Attendance: 2,000

19 May 2001 38	Velež	2–1	Sarajevo	Mostar
		Report		Stadium: Vrapčići Stadium; Attendance: 1,500

26 May 2001 39	Sarajevo	8–0	Krajina	Sarajevo
		Report		Stadium: Koševo City Stadium; Attendance: 2,000

6 June 2001 40	Travnik	1–0	Sarajevo	Travnik
		Report		Stadium: Pirota Stadium; Attendance: 1,000

9 June 2001 41	Sarajevo	0–2	Olimpik	Sarajevo
		Report		Stadium: Koševo City Stadium; Attendance: 400

13 June 2001 42	Đerzelez-Zenica	0–2	Sarajevo	Zenica
		Report		Stadium: Bilino Polje Stadium; Attendance: 200

=== Cup of Bosnia and Herzegovina ===
==== Round of 32 ====
2 December 2000	Brotnjo	0–3	Sarajevo	Čitluk
		Report		Stadium: Bare Stadium; Attendance: 800

==== Round of 16 ====
6 December 2000 First leg	Sarajevo	3–0	Zrinjski	Sarajevo
		Report		Stadium: Koševo City Stadium; Attendance: 2,000

9 December 2000 Second leg	Zrinjski	1–1 (1–4 agg.)	Sarajevo	Mostar
		Report		Stadium: Stadion pod Bijelim Brijegom; Attendance: 1,500

==== Intermediate round ====
On January 31, it was announced that 4 clubs from Republika Srpska will join 8 clubs from the NSBIH to play-off for a unified cup.

14 March 2001 First leg	Sarajevo	1–0	Kozara Gradiška	Sarajevo
		Report		Stadium: Koševo City Stadium; Attendance: 4,000

27 March 2001 Second leg	Kozara Gradiška	0–0 (0–1 agg.)	Sarajevo	Bosanska Gradiška
		Report		Stadium: Gradiška City Stadium; Attendance: 5,000

==== Quarter-finals ====
4 April 2001 First leg	Sarajevo	3–0	Kiseljak	Sarajevo
		Report		Stadium: Koševo City Stadium; Attendance: 3,000

25 April 2001 Second leg	Kiseljak	0–0 (0–3 agg.)	Sarajevo	Kiseljak
		Report		Stadium: Croatian Defenders Stadium; Attendance: 2,000

==== Semi-finals ====
9 May 2001 First leg	Posušje	1–0	Sarajevo	Posušje
		Report		Stadium: Mokri Dolac Stadium; Attendance: 2,000

23 May 2001 Second leg	Sarajevo	4–1 (4–2 agg.)	Posušje	Sarajevo
		Report		Stadium: Koševo City Stadium; Attendance: 8,000

==== Final ====
15 June 2001	Sarajevo	2–3	Željezničar	Sarajevo
19:00	Repuh 19'; Šaranović 50'	Report	Adžem 43'; Alilhodžić 59'; Muharemović 78'	Stadium: Koševo City Stadium; Attendance: 28,000; Referee: Siniša Zrnić (Zenica)
