= 1999–2000 FK Sarajevo season =

Sarajevo
1999–2000 season
- Chairman: Muhamed Granov; Besim Mehmedić
- Manager: Agim Nikolić; Denijal Pirić
- Stadium: Koševo City Stadium
- Premier League BiH: 3rd
- Cup of BiH: Round of 16
- Supercup of BiH: Runners-up
- Top goalscorer: League: Amar Ferhatović (13); All: Amar Ferhatović (13)
- Highest home attendance: 30,000 vs Željezničar (6 May 2000)
- Lowest home attendance: 800 vs Gradina (14 November 1999)
- Average home league attendance: 5,572
- Biggest win: Rudar Kakanj 1–7 Sarajevo (11 June 2000)
- Biggest defeat: Bosna Visoko 4–0 Sarajevo (11 September 1999)

The 1999–2000 Sarajevo season was the club's 51nd season in history, and their 6th consecutive season in the top flight of Bosnian football, the Premier League of BiH. Besides competing in the Premier League, the team competed in the National Cup and National Supercup.

== Squad information ==
=== First-team squad ===
Note: Flags indicate national team as defined under FIFA eligibility rules; some limited exceptions apply. Players may hold more than one non-FIFA nationality.

No.	Pos.	Nation	Player
1	GK	BIH	Almir Tolja
2	DF	BIH	Memnun Suljagić
3	DF	BIH	Ervin Uščuplić
3	DF	BIH	Jasmin Đidić
4	MF	BIH	Samir Duro
5	DF	BIH	Edmir Ahmetović
6	DF	BIH	Muhidin Zukić
6	DF	BIH	Mirzet Krupinac
7	FW	BIH	Alen Škoro
8	MF	BIH	Smajo Mahmutović
8	MF	BIH	Almir Turković
9	FW	BIH	Alen Avdić
10	MF	BIH	Amar Ferhatović (captain)
14	DF	BIH	Rusmir Kadrić
17	DF	BIH	Adnan Fočić
18	MF	BIH	Almedin Hota
18	FW	BIH	Nidal Ferhatović
2 21	FW	BIH	Edin Šaranović

No.	Pos.	Nation	Player
—	GK	BIH	Muhamed Alaim
—	GK	BIH	Bahrudin Omerbegović
—	DF	BIH	Senad Begić
—	DF	BIH	Džemal Berberović
—	DF	BIH	Jasmin Milak
—	DF	BIH	Mirsad Mujkić
—	MF	BIH	Dženan Uščuplić
—	MF	BIH	Anes Čardaklija
—	MF	BIH	Nermin Gogalić
—	MF	BIH	Aldin Janjoš
—	MF	BIH	Bojan Jurić
—	MF	BIH	Albin Pelak
—	MF	BIH	Nermin Pindžo
—	MF	BIH	Edin Šopović
—	FW	BIH	Haris Haskić
—	FW	BIH	Nedim Jusufbegović
—	FW	BIH	Adnan Karamehmedović
—	FW	CRO	Zoran Zekić

== Kit ==
Supplier	Sponsor
(England) Umbro	(Bosnia and Herzegovina) EP, (Bosnia and Herzegovina) VEDRINA

== Competitions ==
=== Overview ===
Competition	First match	Last match	Starting round	Final position	Record							
Competition	First match	Last match	Starting round	Final position	Pld	W	D	L	GF	GA	GD	Win %
First League of BiH – First round	14 August 1999	20 May 2000	Matchday 1	3rd	30	16	7	7	54	24	+30	53.33
First League of BiH – Play-offs	24 May 2000	11 June 2000	Group phase	Group phase	6	4	0	2	14	6	+8	66.67
Cup of BiH	28 November 1999	4 December 1999	Round of 32	Round of 16	2	1	0	1	6	5	+1	50.00
Supercup of BiH	25 November 1999		Final	Runners-up	1	0	1	0	2	2	+0	0.00
Total					39	21	8	10	76	37	+39	53.85

Source: Competitions

=== First League of Bosnia and Herzegovina (First round) ===
==== League table ====
Pos	Team	Pld	W	D	L	GF	GA	GD	Pts	Qualification or relegation
1	Jedinstvo Bihać	30	18	3	9	46	22	+24	57	Qualification to championship play-off
2	Željezničar	30	17	5	8	58	32	+26	56	UEFA Cup qualifying round and championship play-off (Note: Željezničar won 1999–2000 Bosnian Cup and qualified for the qualifying round of the UEFA Cup.)
3	Sarajevo	30	16	7	7	54	24	+30	55	Qualification to championship play-off
4	Rudar Kakanj	30	16	6	8	41	28	+13	54	Qualification to championship play-off
5	Budućnost	30	15	8	7	38	21	+17	53	Qualification to championship play-off

Source: RSSSF.org
Rules for classification: 1) points; 2) goal difference; 3) number of goals scored.

==== Matches ====
14 August 1999 1	Sarajevo	1–1	Đerzelez	Sarajevo
		Report		Stadium: Koševo City Stadium; Attendance: 6,000

22 August 1999 2	Sloboda	1–2	Sarajevo	Tuzla
		Report		Stadium: Tušanj City Stadium; Attendance: 5,500

25 August 1999 3	Sarajevo	1–0	Jedinstvo	Sarajevo
		Report		Stadium: Koševo City Stadium; Attendance: 10,000

28 August 1999 4	Sarajevo	3–0	TOŠK	Sarajevo
		Report		Stadium: Koševo City Stadium; Attendance: 4,500

11 September 1999 5	Bosna	4–0	Sarajevo	Visoko
		Report		Stadium: Luke Stadium; Attendance: 3,500

15 September 1999 6	Sarajevo	3–1	Čelik	Sarajevo
		Report		Stadium: Koševo City Stadium; Attendance: 5,000

18 September 1999 7	Krajina	3–1	Sarajevo	Cazin
		Report		Stadium: Cazin City Stadium; Attendance: 3,000

25 September 1999 8	Sarajevo	0–0	Iskra	Sarajevo
		Report		Stadium: Koševo City Stadium; Attendance: 2,500

12 October 1999 9	Velež	1–0	Sarajevo	Mostar
		Report		Stadium: Vrapčići Stadium; Attendance: 2,000

17 October 1999 10	Sarajevo	3–0	Budućnost	Sarajevo
		Report		Stadium: Koševo City Stadium; Attendance: 2,000

24 October 1999 11	Željezničar	2–0	Sarajevo	Sarajevo
		Report		Stadium: Stadion Grbavica; Attendance: 20,000

30 October 1999 12	Sarajevo	1–1	Rudar	Sarajevo
		Report		Stadium: Koševo City Stadium; Attendance: 1,000

6 November 1999 13	Lukavac	3–0	Sarajevo	Lukavac
		Report		Stadium: Jošik Stadium; Attendance: 2,000

14 November 1999 14	Sarajevo	4–0	Gradina	Sarajevo
		Report		Stadium: Koševo City Stadium; Attendance: 800

19 November 1999 15	Drina	1–2	Sarajevo	Puračić
		Report		Stadium: Stadion Mladosti; Attendance: 500

5 March 2000 16	Đerzelez	1–1	Sarajevo	Sarajevo
		Report		Stadium: Koševo City Stadium; Attendance: 6,000

19 March 2000 17	Sarajevo	4–0	Sloboda	Sarajevo
		Report		Stadium: Koševo City Stadium; Attendance: 3,000

26 March 2000 18	Jedinstvo	0–2	Sarajevo	Bihać
		Report		Stadium: Stadion pod Borićima; Attendance: 6,000

1 April 2000 19	TOŠK	1–0	Sarajevo	Tešanj
		Report		Stadium: Luke Stadium; Attendance: 3,000

9 April 2000 20	Sarajevo	1–0	Bosna	Sarajevo
		Report		Stadium: Koševo City Stadium; Attendance: 6,500

12 April 2000 21	Čelik	1–0	Sarajevo	Zenica
		Report		Stadium: Bilino Polje Stadium; Attendance: 12,000

15 April 2000 22	Sarajevo	3–0	Krajina	Sarajevo
		Report		Stadium: Koševo City Stadium; Attendance: 1,000

19 April 2000 23	Iskra	0–0	Sarajevo	Bugojno
		Report		Stadium: Stadion Jaklić; Attendance: 3,500

26 April 2000 24	Sarajevo	5–1	Velež	Sarajevo
		Report		Stadium: Koševo City Stadium; Attendance: 3,500

29 April 2000 25	Budućnost	0–0	Sarajevo	Banovići
		Report		Stadium: Stadion FK Budućnost; Attendance: 4,000

6 May 2000 26	Sarajevo	4–1	Željezničar	Sarajevo
		Report		Stadium: Koševo City Stadium; Attendance: 30,000

10 May 2000 27	Rudar	0–0	Sarajevo	Kakanj
		Report		Stadium: Pod Vardom Stadium; Attendance: 3,000

13 May 2000 28	Sarajevo	3–0	Lukavac	Sarajevo
		Report		Stadium: Koševo City Stadium; Attendance: 1,000

18 May 2000 29	Gradina	1–5	Sarajevo	Srebrenik
		Report		Stadium: Srebrenik City Stadium; Attendance: 100

20 May 2000 30	Sarajevo	5–0	Drina	Sarajevo
		Report		Stadium: Koševo City Stadium; Attendance: 1,500

=== First League of Bosnia and Herzegovina (Play-offs) ===
==== Group B ====
Team	Pld	W	D	L	GF	GA	GD	Pts
Brotnjo	6	4	0	2	12	7	+5	12
Jedinstvo Bihać	6	4	0	2	10	6	+4	12
Sarajevo	6	4	0	2	14	6	+8	12
Rudar Kakanj	6	0	0	6	2	19	−17	0

==== Matches ====
24 May 2000 1	Sarajevo	2–0	Brotnjo	Sarajevo
17:30 CEST (UTC+2)		Report		Stadium: Koševo City Stadium; Attendance: 9,000

28 May 2000 2	Jedinstvo	2–0	Sarajevo	Bihać
17:30 CEST (UTC+2)		Report		Stadium: Stadion pod Borićima; Attendance: 10,000

1 June 2000 3	Sarajevo	2–0	Rudar	Sarajevo
17:30 CEST (UTC+2)		Report		Stadium: Koševo City Stadium; Attendance: 5,000

5 June 2000 4	Brotnjo	2–1	Sarajevo	Čitluk
17:30 CEST (UTC+2)		Report		Stadium: Bare Stadium; Attendance: 7,000

9 June 2000 5	Sarajevo	2–1	Jedinstvo	Sarajevo
17:30 CEST (UTC+2)		Report		Stadium: Koševo City Stadium; Attendance: 8,000

11 June 2000 6	Rudar	1–7	Sarajevo	Kakanj
16:15 CEST (UTC+2)		Report		Stadium: Pod Vardom Stadium; Attendance: 300

=== Cup of Bosnia and Herzegovina ===
==== Round of 32 ====
28 November 1999	UNIS Vogošća	2–5	Sarajevo	Vogošća
		Report		Stadium: Hakija Mršo Stadium; Attendance: 500

==== Round of 16 ====
4 December 1999	Travnik	3–1	Sarajevo	Travnik
		Report		Stadium: Pirota Stadium; Attendance: 4,000

=== Supercup of Bosnia and Herzegovina ===
25 November 1999 Final	Sarajevo	2–2 (a.e.t.) (2–3 p)	Bosna Visoko	Sarajevo
13:00 CET (UTC+1)		Report		Stadium: Koševo City Stadium; Attendance: 1,000
