= Elvis Corić =

Bosnian footballer

Personal information
- Date of birth: 7 July 1981 (age 45)
- Place of birth: Mostar
- Height: 1.88 m (6 ft 2 in)
- Position: Forward

Senior career*
Years	Team	Apps	(Gls)
2001–2002	NK Brotnjo		
2002	FK Velež Mostar		
2003–2004	HNK Cibalia		
2005–2007	FK Velež Mostar		
2006	→ HŠK Posušje (loan)		
2007–2008	NK Troglav 1918 Livno		
2008–2009	NK Zvijezda Gradačac		
2010	KF Flamurtari		
2010–2011	NK Zvijezda Gradačac		
2011	FK Velež Mostar		
2011–2012	Persik Kediri		
- * Club domestic league appearances and goals

Elvis Corić (born 7 July 1981) is a retired Bosnian football striker.
