= Berberović =

Berberović is a surname. Notable people with the surname include:

- Džemal Berberović (born 1981), Bosnian football player
- Nefisa Berberović (born 1999), Bosnian tennis player
