= Albin Pelak =

Bosnian football player (born 1981)

Personal information
- Full name: Albin Pelak
- Date of birth: 9 April 1981 (age 45)
- Place of birth: Novi Pazar, SR Serbia, SFR Yugoslavia
- Height: 1.83 m (6 ft 0 in)
- Position: Midfielder

Senior career*
Years	Team	Apps	(Gls)
1991–1997	Varteks	3	(1)
1997–2003	Sarajevo	107	(21)
2003	Cerezo Osaka	3	(1)
2003–2004	Dinamo Zagreb	0	(0)
2004–2005	Sarajevo	52	(14)
2006–2007	Željezničar	19	(7)
2007	Zvezda Irkutsk	6	(0)
2007–2009	Željezničar	23	(6)
2009–2010	Olimpik	13	(1)
Total		226	(51)

International career
2002	Bosnia and Herzegovina U21	12	(1)
2002–2005	Bosnia and Herzegovina	2	(0)
- * Club domestic league appearances and goals

Albin Pelak (born 9 April 1981) is a former Bosnian football player.

== Club career ==
Pelak is most famous in Bosnian and Sarajevo circles for signing with Željezničar after making an explicit promise to FK Sarajevo supporters that he would never play there.

Prior to signing with Željezničar, Pelak was a popular player for Sarajevo, receiving praise from the press as well as supporters for his high work rate and leadership ability. He was a significant figure in Sarajevo's youth squad composed of players born in 1981/1982, which was one of the most capable squads in Bosnia and Herzegovina's history. Many players from that generation such as Alen Škoro, Džemal Berberović, Damir Mirvić went on to have relatively successful careers in Europe.

Pelak himself also made several tries, albeit unsuccessful at playing abroad, going to Cerezo Osaka of Japan in 2002 and Dinamo Zagreb of neighboring Croatia in 2003. While he did not stay at either club for very long, it was reported that he had been paid handsomely for his failed bids abroad; his deal with Cerzo Osaka reportedly netted him €1 million. On 4 April 2009, Pelak ended his contract with Željezničar and joined Olimpik, playing in the Bosnian Premier League.

== International career ==
He made his debut for Bosnia and Herzegovina in an August 2002 friendly match against Serbia and Montenegro and has earned a total of 2 caps, scoring no goals. His second and final international was an October 2005 World Cup qualification match against San Marino.

== Career statistics ==
=== Club ===
Appearances and goals by club, season and competition
Club	Season	League		
Club	Season	Division	Apps	Goals
Sarajevo	1999–2000	Bosnian First League	8	2
Sarajevo	2000–01	Bosnian Premier League	34	12
Sarajevo	2001–02	Bosnian Premier League	4	1
Sarajevo	2001–02	Bosnian Premier League	11	0
Sarajevo	Total		57	15
Cerezo Osaka	2003	J1 League	3	1
Sarajevo	2003–04	Bosnian Premier League	8	1
Sarajevo	2004–05	Bosnian Premier League	10	3
Sarajevo	2005–06	Bosnian Premier League	12	5
Sarajevo	Total		30	9
Željezničar Sarajevo	2005–06	Bosnian Premier League	6	2
Željezničar Sarajevo	2006–07	Bosnian Premier League	13	5
Željezničar Sarajevo	Total		19	7
Zvezda Irkutsk	2007	First Division	6	0
Željezničar Sarajevo	2007–08	Bosnian Premier League	11	3
Željezničar Sarajevo	2008–09	Bosnian Premier League	12	3
Željezničar Sarajevo	Total		23	6
Olimpik	2009–10	Bosnian Premier League	13	1
Career total			151	39

=== International ===
Appearances and goals by national team and year
National team	Year	Apps	Goals
Bosnia and Herzegovina	2002	1	0
Bosnia and Herzegovina	2005	1	0
Total		2	0
