= Džemal Berberović =

Bosnian footballer (born 1981)

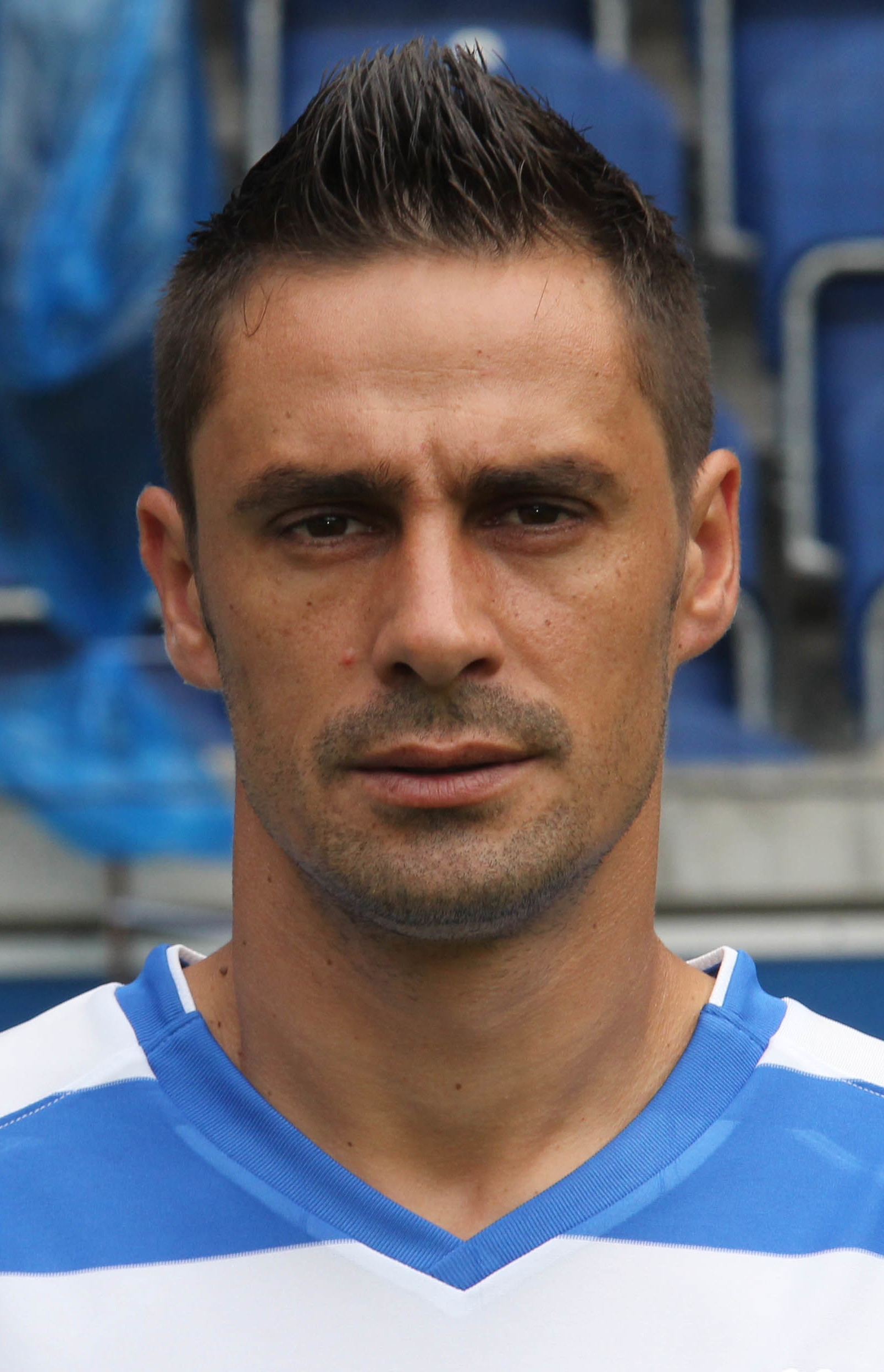
- Berberović with MSV Duisburg in 2012

Personal information
- Date of birth: 5 November 1981 (age 44)
- Place of birth: Sarajevo, SFR Yugoslavia
- Height: 1.81 m (5 ft 11 in)
- Position: Right-back

Senior career*
Years	Team	Apps	(Gls)
1999–2003	Sarajevo	102	(5)
2003–2005	Bayer Leverkusen	0	(0)
2004	→ VfL Osnabrück (loan)	13	(0)
2005	Sarajevo	22	(2)
2005–2009	Litex Lovech	62	(0)
2007	→ Kuban Krasnodar (loan)	5	(0)
2009–2010	Denizlispor	36	(0)
2010–2011	Litex Lovech	23	(0)
2011–2013	MSV Duisburg	43	(1)
2013–2014	Litex Lovech	16	(0)
2014–2016	Sarajevo	36	(0)
Total		358	(8)

International career
	Bosnia and Herzegovina U18	3	(0)
1999–2003	Bosnia and Herzegovina U21	14	(0)
2003–2010	Bosnia and Herzegovina	33	(0)
- * Club domestic league appearances and goals

Džemal Berberović (Bosnian pronunciation: [berběːroʋitɕ]; born 5 November 1981) is a Bosnian former professional footballer who played as a right-back.

== Club career ==
Berberović started his career at hometown club Sarajevo. At age 22, he signed with German club Bayer Leverkusen, but did not play in any official matches. In January 2005, he returned for six months to Bosnia and Herzegovina. Berberović played for and captained Sarajevo in the Bosnian Premier League before he moved to Litex Lovech in June 2005. In January 2009, he was transferred to the Turkish Süper Lig side Denizlispor. In June 2010, he moved back to Litex. In July 2011, he was transferred to 2. Bundesliga club MSV Duisburg.

== International career ==
Berberović has made some very important appearances for the Bosnia and Herzegovina U21 national team. He made his senior debut for Bosnia and Herzegovina in a February 2003 friendly match away against Wales and has earned a total of 33 caps, scoring no goals. His final international was a June 2010 friendly against Germany.

Berberović concluded his international career on 29 July 2010.

== Career statistics ==
=== Club ===
Appearances and goals by club, season and competition
Club	Season	League			National cup (Note: Includes Bosnian Cup, Bulgarian Cup, Turkish Cup, DFB-Pokal)		Continental		Other		Total	
Club	Season	Division	Apps	Goals	Apps	Goals	Apps	Goals	Apps	Goals	Apps	Goals
Sarajevo	1999–2000	Bosnian First League	12	0	0	0	—		—		12	0
Sarajevo	2000–01	Bosnian Premier League	34	2	10	0	—		—		44	2
Sarajevo	2001–02	Bosnian Premier League	24	0	6	0	2 (Note: Appearances in UEFA Cup)	0	—		32	0
Sarajevo	2002–03	Bosnian Premier League	31	3	4	0	4	0	—		39	3
Sarajevo	2003–04	Bosnian Premier League	1	0	—		—		—		1	0
Sarajevo	Total		102	5	20	0	6	0	—		128	5
VfL Osnabrück (loan)	2003–04	2. Bundesliga	13	0	—		—		—		13	0
Sarajevo	2004–05	Bosnian Premier League	22	2	7	0	—		—		29	2
Litex Lovech	2005–06	A Group	24	0	2	0	9	0	—		35	0
Litex Lovech	2006–07	A Group	13	0	2	0	5	0	—		20	0
Litex Lovech	2007–08	A Group	11	0	3	0	—		—		14	0
Litex Lovech	2008–09	A Group	14	0	2	0	2	0	—		18	0
Litex Lovech	Total		62	0	9	0	16	0	—		87	0
Kuban Krasnodar (loan)	2007	Russian Premier League	5	0	—		—		—		5	0
Denizlispor	2008–09	Süper Lig	12	0	1	0	—		—		13	0
Denizlispor	2009–10	Süper Lig	24	0	5	0	—		—		29	0
Denizlispor	Total		36	0	6	0	—		—		42	0
Litex Lovech	2010–11	A Group	23	0	4	0	2 (Note: One appearance in UEFA Champions League, one appearance in UEFA Europa League)	0	1 (Note: Appearance in Bulgarian Supercup)	0	30	0
Litex Lovech	2011–12	A Group	—		—		3 (Note: Appearances in UEFA Champions League)	0	—		3	0
Litex Lovech	Total		23	0	4	0	5	0	1	0	33	0
MSV Duisburg	2011–12	2. Bundesliga	29	1	2	0	—		—		31	1
MSV Duisburg	2012–13	2. Bundesliga	14	0	2	0	—		—		16	0
MSV Duisburg	Total		43	1	4	0	—		—		47	1
MSV Duisburg II	2012–13	Regionalliga West	4	0	—		—		—		4	0
Litex Lovech	2013–14	A Group	16	0	0	0	—		—		16	0
Sarajevo	2014–15	Bosnian Premier League	22	0	2	0	4 (Note: Appearances in UEFA Europa League)	0	—		28	0
Sarajevo	2015–16	Bosnian Premier League	14	0	2	0	0	0	—		16	0
Sarajevo	Total		36	0	4	0	4	0	—		44	0
Career total			362	8	54	0	31	0	1	0	448	8

=== International ===
Appearances and goals by national team and year
National team	Year	Apps	Goals
Bosnia and Herzegovina	2003	4	0
Bosnia and Herzegovina	2004	1	0
Bosnia and Herzegovina	2005	6	0
Bosnia and Herzegovina	2006	3	0
Bosnia and Herzegovina	2007	7	0
Bosnia and Herzegovina	2008	6	0
Bosnia and Herzegovina	2009	4	0
Bosnia and Herzegovina	2010	2	0
Total		33	0

== Honours ==
Sarajevo

- Bosnian Premier League: 2014–15
- Bosnian Cup: 2001–02, 2004–05

Litex Lovech

- Bulgarian A PFG: 2010–11
- Bulgarian Cup: 2007–08

Individual

- Ismir Pintol trophy: 2005
