= Danijel Krivić =

Bosnian-Herzegovinian footballer

Personal information
- Full name: Danijel Krivić
- Date of birth: 17 September 1980 (age 46)
- Place of birth: Livno, SR Bosnia, SFR Yugoslavia
- Height: 1.80 m (5 ft 11 in)
- Positions: Full back; wingback

Youth career
- u17 HNK Rijeka: NK Troglav

Senior career*
Years	Team	Apps	(Gls)
1999–2001	Brotnjo	109	(2)
2003	Dinamo Zagreb Győri ETO	2	(0)
2003–2005	Zadar	74	(0)
2005–2006	Međimurje	27	(1)
2006–2007	Široki Brijeg	29	(1)
2007–2008	Mons	27	(0)
2008–2015	Troglav	153	(17)

International career
2002	Bosnia and Herzegovina	1	(0)

Managerial career
- 2024-: Troglav
- * Club domestic league appearances and goals as of 24 September 2015

Danijel Krivić (born 17 September 1980) is a retired football defender from Bosnia and Herzegovina.

== International career ==
Krivić made his international debut for Bosnia and Herzegovina in an August 2002 friendly match against Serbia and Montenegro. It remained his sole international appearance.
