= Vahidin Čahtarević =

Bosnian footballer

Personal information
- Full name: Vahidin Čahtarević
- Date of birth: 24 August 1976 (age 50)
- Place of birth: Zavidovići, SFR Yugoslavia
- Height: 1.78 m (5 ft 10 in)
- Position: Midfielder

Senior career*
Years	Team	Apps	(Gls)
1995–1998	Čelik Zenica	62	(3)
1998–2000	Jedinstvo Bihać	50	(5)
2000–2001	FK Sarajevo	22	(1)
2001–2006	Jedinstvo Bihać	28+	(4+)
2006	HAŠK Zagreb		
2007	Croatia Sesvete		
2008–2010	Jedinstvo Bihać	9+	(1+)
2010	Vinodol		
2011–2012	Krajina Cazin	7	(1)
2012–2013	Jedinstvo Bihać	6	(1)
2013–2014	Slunj		
Total		184	(16)

International career^{‡}
- Bosnia U-21
2000	Bosnia and Herzegovina	2	(0)

Managerial career
- 2018–2019: Al-Qaisumah (assistant)
- * Club domestic league appearances and goals as of 13.5.2024. ‡ National team caps and goals as of 13 May 2024

Vahidin Čahtarević (born 24 August 1976) is a Bosnian retired football player.

== Club career ==
In 2012, Čahtarević claimed to have played in over 30 'fixed' matches during his career among others playing in a game against fellow strugglers Orašje which got his club Jedinstvo Bihać relegated after some alleged dubious refereeing.

== International career ==
Čahtarević made two appearances for Bosnia and Herzegovina in two March 2000 friendly matches away against Jordan.

== Post-playing career ==
He worked as an assistant to Kemal Alispahić at Al-Qaisumah in Saudi Arabia and started working for the youth section at Jedinstvo in 2019.
