= Darko Raca =

Bosnian-Herzegovinian footballer

Personal information
- Full name: Darko Raca
- Date of birth: May 24, 1977 (age 49)
- Place of birth: Sarajevo, SFR Yugoslavia
- Height: 1.82 m (5 ft 11 1/2 in)
- Position: Defender

Senior career*
Years	Team	Apps	(Gls)
–1998	Mladost Apatin		
1998–2001	Kozara Gradiška		
2001–2004	Orašje	14+	(2+)
2005	FK Sarajevo	13	(1)
2005	Vasalund		
2006–2007	Syrianska		
2007–2008	Orašje		
2008	Syrianska		
2009	Laktaši	10	(1)
2010	ČSK Čelarevo	14	(0)
2010–2011	Sloboda Tuzla	21	(0)
2011	Slavija Sarajevo	4	(0)
- * Club domestic league appearances and goals

Darko Raca (born May 24, 1977) is a Bosnian-Herzegovinian football defender.

Beside the Bosnian clubs FK Kozara Gradiška, HNK Orašje and FK Sarajevo, he had previously played with the Serbian clubs FK Mladost Apatin and FK ČSK Čelarevo, and the Swedish clubs Vasalunds IF and Syrianska FC.
