= Alen Mešanović =

Bosnia and Herzegovina association football player

Personal information
- Full name: Alen Mešanović
- Date of birth: October 26, 1975 (age 50)
- Place of birth: Banovici, SFR Yugoslavia
- Height: 1.83 m (6 ft 0 in)
- Position: Striker

Senior career*
Years	Team	Apps	(Gls)
1995–1996	Velež Mostar		
1996–1997	Radnički Lukavac		
1997–2001	Jedinstvo Bihać	1	
2001–2002	FK Sarajevo	11	(2)
2002–2003	Jedinstvo Bihać		
2003–2004	Sloboda Tuzla	5	(12)
2004–2006	Čelik Zenica	3	(0)
2006–2008	NK Posušje	21	(10)
2008–2009	Jedinstvo Bihać	2	(1)
2009–2010	Željezničar Sarajevo	18	(10)
2010	Hrvatski Dragovoljac	1	(0)
2011-2012	Sloboda Tuzla	24	(2)
Total		87	(37)

International career^{‡}
- Bosnia U-21
1997-2000	Bosnia and Herzegovina	2	(0)

Managerial career
- NK Podgrmeč
- * Club domestic league appearances and goals as of April 2024 ‡ National team caps and goals as of 1 December 2009

Alen Mešanović (born October 26, 1975) is a former Bosnian international footballer.

== International career ==
He made his debut for Bosnia and Herzegovina in a November 1997 friendly match away against Tunisia and has earned a total of two caps, scoring no goals. His second and final international was a March 2000 friendly against Jordan.

== Honours ==
=== Club ===
Sarajevo

- Bosnian Cup: 2001–02

Željezničar Sarajevo

- Bosnian Premier League: 2009–10
