= Nedim Hiroš =

Bosnia and Herzegovinan former footballer (born 1984)

Personal information
- Date of birth: 29 September 1984 (age 42)
- Place of birth: Sarajevo, SFR Yugoslavia
- Height: 1.78 m (5 ft 10 in)
- Position: Forward

Youth career
- Sarajevo

Senior career*
Years	Team	Apps	(Gls)
2004–2005	Marila Příbram	7	(0)
2005	IFK Mariehamn	4	(0)
2006–2008	SAŠK Napredak		
2008–2009	Sarajevo	26	(1)
2009–2010	Boden		(8)
2010–2012	Olimpik	17	(0)
2012	Velež Mostar	6	(0)
2013–2015	Bosna Visoko	9	(1)
2015	Bosna Union		
- * Club domestic league appearances and goals

Nedim Hiroš (born 29 September 1984) is a Bosnia and Herzegovinan professional footballer who played as a forward. Besides in his native Bosnia, Hiroš played in the Czech Republic, Finland and Sweden.
