= Emir Obuća =

Bosnian football manager (born 1978)

Personal information
- Date of birth: 11 December 1978 (age 47)
- Place of birth: Sarajevo, SFR Yugoslavia
- Height: 1.84 m (6 ft 0 in)
- Position: Striker

Senior career*
Years	Team	Apps	(Gls)
1998	FK Vratnik	1	
1998	FK Željezničar Sarajevo	1	(0)
1998–1999	Tienen		
1999–2000	Racing Mechelen		
2000–2001	Olimpik		
2001–2003	Sarajevo	56	(36)
2003–2004	Litex Lovech	1	(0)
2004–2007	Sarajevo	73	(21)
2007–2008	PAS Hamedan	21	(8)
2008	Sarajevo	9	(2)
2009	Rah Ahan	9	(0)
2009	SAŠK Napredak		
2010	Čelik Zenica	18	(5)
2011–2012	Sarajevo	34	(15)
Total		223	(87)

Managerial career
- 2022: Sarajevo (caretaker)
- * Club domestic league appearances and goals

Emir Obuća (born 11 December 1978) is a Bosnian football manager and former player.

== Playing career ==
Obuća had several spells with hometown club Sarajevo, winning one league title and four domestic cups with the side. He scored 89 goals in 205 games for the club.

== Managerial career ==
On 20 October 2022, Obuća was named as Sarajevo's caretaker manager, following Feđa Dudić's resignation. In his first game as manager, Sarajevo beat Posušje in a league game on 23 October. On 5 November 2022, he suffered his first defeat as manager in a 2–0 loss to Sloboda Tuzla. Obuća was succeeded as manager by Mirza Varešanović on 12 December 2022.

== Managerial statistics ==
As of 20 November 2022

Managerial record by team and tenure
Team	From	To	Record							
Team	From	To	G	W	D	L	GF	GA	GD	Win %
Sarajevo (caretaker)	20 October 2022	12 December 2022	4	2	0	2	4	5	−1	50.00
Total			4	2	0	2	4	5	−1	50.00

== Honours ==
=== Player ===
Sarajevo

- Bosnian Premier League: 2006–07
- Bosnian Cup: 1996–97, 1997–98, 2001–02, 2004–05

Litex Lovech

- Bulgarian Cup: 2003–04

Individual

- Bosnian Premier League top scorer: 2002–03
