= 2004–05 Bosnia and Herzegovina Football Cup =

Tournament details
- Country: Bosnia and Herzegovina
- Teams: 32

Final positions
- Champions: Sarajevo; 3rd national cup title
- Runners-up: Široki Brijeg

2004–05 Bosnia and Herzegovina Football Cup was the eleventh season of the Bosnia and Herzegovina's annual football cup, and a fifth season of the unified competition. The competition started on 22 September 2004 with the first round and concluded on 17 May 2005 with the final.

== First round ==
Thirty-two teams entered in the first round. The matches were played on 22 September 2004.

Team 1	Score	Team 2
Leotar	1–1 (6–5 p)	Žepče Limorad
Željezničar	3–0	Budućnost Banovići
Zrinjski	3–0	Sloboda Tuzla
Čelik Zenica	1–0	Rudar Ugljevik
Široki Brijeg	1–0	Rudar Prijedor
Travnik	0–1	SAŠK Napredak
Borac Banja Luka	5–1	Drina Zvornik
Mladost Gacko	0–0 (2–3 p)	Posušje
Slavija	4–1	Ljubuški
Branitelj Rodoč	0–0 (6–5 p)	Modriča Maxima
Troglav	0–1	Orašje
Famos Hrasnica	1–3	Sarajevo
Rudar Kakanj	1–3	Ljubić Prnjavor
Sloga Doboj	1–0	Vitez FIS
Kolina Ustikolina	1–4	Velež
Radnik Bijeljina	1–0	Podgrmeč Sanski Most

== Second round ==
The 16 winners from the prior round enter this round. The first legs were played on 13 October and the second legs were played on 20 October 2004.

Team 1	Agg.	Team 2	1st leg	2nd leg
Borac Banja Luka	3–5	Sarajevo	2–1	1–4
Leotar	3–7	Orašje	3–0	0–7
Čelik Zenica	3–3 (6–7 p)	Zrinjski	3–0	0–3
Široki Brijeg	7–3	Ljubić Prnjavor	4–2	3–1
Željezničar	5–2	Velež	3–0	2–2
Sloga Doboj	1–3	Slavija	1–2	0–1
SAŠK Napredak	3–3 (a)	Posušje	2–0	1–3
Radnik Bijeljina	7–2	Branitelj Rodoč	2–0	5–2

== Quarterfinals ==
The eight winners from the prior round enter this round. The first legs were played on 27 October and the second legs were played on 10 November 2004.

Team 1	Agg.	Team 2	1st leg	2nd leg
Široki Brijeg	3–0	Željezničar	2–0	1–0
Sarajevo	2–1	Orašje	1–1	1–0
Slavija	3–1	Radnik Bijeljina	1–0	2–1
SAŠK Napredak	1–4	Zrinjski	1–1	0–3

== Semifinals ==
The four winners from the prior round enter this round. The first legs will be played on 6 April and the second legs were played on 13 April 2005.

Team 1	Agg.	Team 2	1st leg	2nd leg
Slavija	1–5	Sarajevo	0–2	1–3
Široki Brijeg	2–2 (a)	Zrinjski	1–0	1–2

== Final ==
=== First leg ===
11 May 2005

Široki Brijeg	0–1	Sarajevo
	Report	Obuća 10'

Stadion Pecara, Široki Brijeg
Attendance: 2,000
Referee: Semir Kaplan (Stolac)

=== Second leg ===
17 May 2005

Sarajevo	1–1	Široki Brijeg
Obuća 42'	Report	Juričić 66'

Stadion Koševo, Sarajevo
Attendance: 14,000
Referee: Slavko Zovkić (Pelagićevo)
In second half: Novo Panić (Doboj)

Sarajevo won 2–1 on aggregate.

== See also ==
- 2004–05 Premier League of Bosnia and Herzegovina
