= Emir Janjoš =

Bosnian footballer

Personal information
- Date of birth: 28 March 1986 (age 40)
- Place of birth: Sarajevo, SFR Yugoslavia
- Height: 1.77 m (5 ft 10 in)
- Position: Midfielder

Senior career*
Years	Team	Apps	(Gls)
2004–2009	Sarajevo	50	(2)
2006–2007	→ Olimpik (loan)		
2010	Harstad	0	(0)
2011–2015	Biser		
2015	Bosna Sema		

International career
	Bosnia U17	3	(0)
	Bosnia U19	3	(0)
- * Club domestic league appearances and goals

Emir Janjoš (born 28 March 1986) is a Bosnian retired football midfielder who last played for Bosna Union.

== Club career ==
Janjoš started his career with FK Sarajevo. In October 2007, he played for Sarajevo in the UEFA Cup against FC Basel. In 2010, he moved to Norway to sign for Harstad.

However, he had to leave Norway due to problems with his work permit and decided to end his playing career immediately. He did occasionally play for Biser afterwards and turned out for amateur side Bosna Sema.

== Personal life ==
His father Mehmed Janjoš also was a football player.
