= Memnun Suljagić =

Bosnian footballer

Personal information
- Full name: Memnun Suljagić
- Date of birth: 16 February 1966 (age 60)
- Place of birth: Sarajevo, SFR Yugoslavia
- Position: Defender

Team information
- Current team: FK Sarajevo (youth coordinator)

Senior career*
Years	Team	Apps	(Gls)
1989–2002	FK Sarajevo	211	(19)

International career
1999	Bosnia and Herzegovina	1	(0)

Managerial career
- 2008–2013: FK Sarajevo (youth)
- 2014–: FK Sarajevo (youth coordinator)
- * Club domestic league appearances and goals

Memnun Suljagić (born 16 February 1966) is a retired Bosnian professional footballer and youth coach. As a player, he represented FK Sarajevo, and was a member of the 1998–99 title winning side.

== International career ==
He made one appearance for Bosnia and Herzegovina, in an August 1999 friendly match against Liechtenstein.
