= Safet Nadarević =

Bosnian footballer

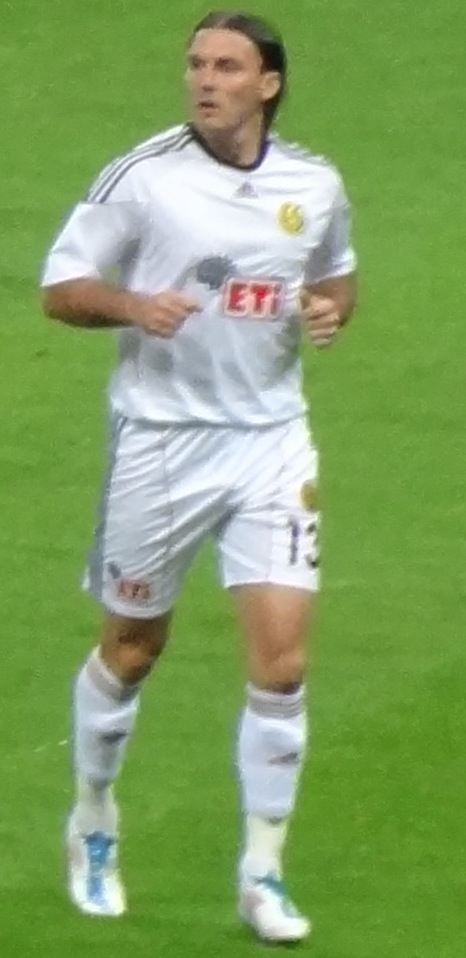
- Nadarević playing for Eskişehirspor

Personal information
- Date of birth: 30 August 1980 (age 46)
- Place of birth: Cazin, SR Bosnia and Herzegovina, Yugoslavia
- Height: 1.85 m (6 ft 1 in)
- Position: Defender

Youth career
- 1991–1998: FK Krajina Cazin

Senior career*
Years	Team	Apps	(Gls)
1998–2003	Jedinstvo Bihać		
2003–2004	Sarajevo	43	(2)
2005–2008	Zagreb	78	(1)
2008–2012	Eskişehirspor	104	(2)
2012–2013	Zagreb	20	(0)
2013	Jedinstvo Bihać	4	(0)

International career^{‡}
2001–2010	Bosnia and Herzegovina	30	(0)

Managerial career
- 2017–2018: Jedinstvo Bihać
- * Club domestic league appearances and goals as of 23 December 2020 ‡ National team caps and goals as of 00:28, 2 May 2011 (UTC)

Safet Nadarević (born 30 August 1980) is a retired Bosnian footballer who played as a defender.

== Club career ==
Nadarević started his career at NK Jedinstvo Bihać. He then played for FK Sarajevo and NK Zagreb before joining Eskişehirspor in June 2008, on a 3-year contract.

On 29 August 2012, Nadarević signed a one-year contract with NK Zagreb. On 27 September 2013, Nadarević signed for NK Jedinstvo Bihać

== International career ==
Nadarević made his debut for Bosnia and Herzegovina in a June 2001 Merdeka Tournament match against Bahrain and has earned a total of 30 caps, scoring no goals. His final international was a September 2010 European Championship qualification match against France.
