= 2001–02 Bosnia and Herzegovina Football Cup =

Tournament details
- Country: Bosnia and Herzegovina
- Teams: 32

Final positions
- Champions: Sarajevo; 2nd national cup title
- Runners-up: Željezničar

2001–02 Bosnia and Herzegovina Football Cup was the eighth season of the Bosnia and Herzegovina's annual football cup, and a second season of the unified competition. The competition started on 28 November 2001 with the First Round and concluded on 29 May 2002 with the Final.

== First round ==
Thirty-two teams entered in the First Round. The first legs were played on 28 November and the second legs were played on 2 December 2001.

Team 1	Agg.	Team 2	1st leg	2nd leg
Sarajevo	w/o	Sloboda Novi Grad	–	–
BSK Banja Luka	5–3	Goražde	4–1	1–2
Olimpik	6–2	Glasinac Sokolac	5–0	1–2
Bosna Visoko	4–3	Rudar Ugljevik	3–1	1–2
Sloboda Tuzla	1–2	Leotar	1–0	0–2
Iskra Bugojno	2–3	Mladost Gacko	2–0	0–3
Radnik Bijeljina	4–5	Troglav	2–1	2–4
Brotnjo	7–6	Borac Banja Luka	4–2	3–4
Kozara Gradiška	3–4	Željezničar	2–2	1–2
Jedinstvo Brčko	2–6	Posušje	1–0	1–6
Zrinjski	2–3	Slavija	2–0	0–3
Velež	2–5	Čelik Zenica	2–1	0–4
Stolac	3–5	Grude	2–3	1–2
UNIS Vogošća	3–5	Budućnost Banovići	2–2	1–3
Orašje	1–1 (5–4 p)	Jedinstvo Bihać	1–0	0–1
Široki Brijeg	3–2	Tomislav	3–1	0–1

== Second round ==
The 16 winners from the prior round enter this round. The first legs were played on 24 February and the second legs were played on 27 February 2002.

Team 1	Agg.	Team 2	1st leg	2nd leg
Brotnjo	2–2 (6–5 p)	Olimpik	1–1	1–1
Sarajevo	9–0	Troglav	6–0	3–0
Orašje	2–4	Bosna Visoko	2–1	0–3
Budućnost Banovići	2–5	Leotar	2–2	0–3
Mladost Gacko	3–3 (a)	Široki Brijeg	2–0	1–3
Slavija	3–5	Željezničar	1–2	2–3
Posušje	0–1	Grude	0–1	0–0
Čelik Zenica	2–0	BSK Banja Luka	2–0	0–0

== Quarterfinals ==
The eight winners from the prior round enter this round. The first legs were played on 13 March and the second legs were played on 20 March 2002.

Team 1	Agg.	Team 2	1st leg	2nd leg
Mladost Gacko	2–2 (a)	Željezničar	2–1	0–1
Čelik Zenica	4–2	Bosna Visoko	3–1	1–1
Leotar	5–0	Grude	5–0	0–0
Sarajevo	4–0	Brotnjo	4–0	0–0

== Semifinals ==
The four winners from the prior round enter this round. The first legs will be played on 10 April and the second legs were played on 30 April 2002.

Team 1	Agg.	Team 2	1st leg	2nd leg
Leotar	1–4	Željezničar	1–3	0–2
Sarajevo	1–0	Čelik Zenica	1–0	0–0

== Final ==
29 May 2002

Sarajevo	2–1	Željezničar
Zukić 10'; Osmanhodžić 90+4'	Report	Gredić 90'

Stadion Koševo, Sarajevo
Attendance: 20,000
Referee: Sead Kulović (Sarajevo)

== See also ==
- 2001–02 Premier League of Bosnia and Herzegovina
