= Besim Mehmedić =

Bosnian politician (born 1955)

Prime Minister of Sarajevo Canton
- In office 21 January 2009 – 11 November 2010
- Preceded by: Hajrudin Ibrahimović (acting)
- Succeeded by: Zlatko Mešić (acting); Fikret Musić

Federal Minister of Traffic and Communication
- In office 12 December 1998 – 14 February 2003
- Preceded by: Office established
- Succeeded by: Nedžad Branković

Personal details
- Born: 12 September 1955 (age 71) Sarajevo, PR Bosnia and Herzegovina, FPR Yugoslavia
- Party: Party for Bosnia and Herzegovina (until 2012)
- Education: University of Sarajevo (BArch)

Besim Mehmedić (born 12 September 1955) is a Bosnian politician who served as Prime Minister of Sarajevo Canton from 2009 to 2011. He was also the director of the Sarajevo Institute for Urbanization from 2002 to 2004, and the Federal Minister of Traffic and Communication from 1998 until 2003. He was a member of the Party for Bosnia and Herzegovina until 2012.

Mehmedić was born in Sarajevo, FPR Yugoslavia, present-day Bosnia and Herzegovina, where he completed his primary and highschool education, before graduating from the Faculty of Architecture at the University of Sarajevo in 1979.
