= Edin Pehlić =

Bosnian-Herzegovinian footballer

Personal information
- Full name: Edin Pehlić
- Date of birth: January 13, 1984 (age 42)
- Place of birth: Stolac, SR Bosnia and Herzegovina, SFR Yugoslavia
- Height: 1.86 m (6 ft 1 in)
- Position: Midfielder

Youth career
- 1998–2000: Krajina Cazin

Senior career*
Years	Team	Apps	(Gls)
2000–2001	Igman Konjic	15	(6)
2001–2005	Sarajevo	6	(2)
2005–2010	FBK Kaunas	116	(60)
2008	→ MTZ-RIPO Minsk (loan)	10	(2)
2011	Sarajevo	7	(3)
2012	Velež Mostar	3	(0)
2013–2015	Igman Konjic	28	(5)

International career^{‡}
2001-2002	Bosnia and Herzegovina U19	6	(1)
2003–2006	Bosnia and Herzegovina U21	1	(0)
- * Club domestic league appearances and goals ‡ National team caps and goals as of 29 December 2022

Edin Pehlić (born January 13, 1984) is a Bosnian-Herzegovinian former footballer.

== Club career ==
Pehlić has played for FK Sarajevo in the Premier League of Bosnia and Herzegovina and FBK Kaunas in the Lithuanian First Division. He joined in the spring of 2008 on loan to MTZ-RIPO Minsk of Belarus and returned in Winter 2009 to FBK Kaunas. On 6 January 2011 signed with his former club FK Sarajevo. After one year with Sarajevo, signed on 22 January 2012 for League rival Velez Mostar.

== Personal life ==
Edin and his wife Aida have a son named Mak (born 2008).
