= Adnan Osmanhodžić =

Bosnian football manager (born 1971)

Personal information
- Date of birth: 24 May 1971 (age 55)
- Place of birth: Tuzla, SFR Yugoslavia
- Height: 1.80 m (5 ft 11 in)
- Position: Midfielder

Team information
- Current team: Tuzla City (assistant)

Youth career
- 1977–1989: Sloboda Tuzla

Senior career*
Years	Team	Apps	(Gls)
1989	Sloboda Tuzla	1	(0)
1989–1990	→ Bjelovar (loan)	13	(3)
1990–1991	→ Jedinstvo Kalesija (loan)	18	(6)
1994–1995	MTV Ingolstadt	11	(2)
1995–1996	Triestina	18	(1)
1995–2000	Sloboda Tuzla	91	(16)
2000–2005	Sarajevo	96	(21)
2005–2008	Sloboda Tuzla	41	(6)
2008–2009	Bratstvo Gračanica		
Total		289	(55)

International career
1999	Bosnia and Herzegovina	2	(0)

Managerial career
- 2009: Sloboda Tuzla (caretaker)
- 2023: Tuzla City (caretaker)
- * Club domestic league appearances and goals

Adnan Osmanhodžić (born 24 May 1971) is a Bosnian professional football manager and former player who is currently working as an assistant manager at Bosnian Premier League club Tuzla City.

== Club career ==
Osmanhodžić started his career with hometown club Sloboda Tuzla, before being loaned to lower-tier sides Bjelovar and Jedinstvo Kalesija. After the Bosnian War he moved to Germany, where he played for MTV Ingolstadt, before joining Italian side Triestina. Osmanhodžić quickly returned home and again joined Sloboda Tuzla, whom he represented for five seasons. In 2000, he joined Bosnian powerhouse Sarajevo, where he stayed for a further five seasons. He concluded his career with Sloboda in 2008.

== International career ==
Osmanhodžić made his debut for Bosnia and Herzegovina in a June 1999 European Championship qualification match away against the Faroe Islands and has earned a total of 2 caps, scoring no goals. His second and final international was an August 1999 friendly match against Liechtenstein.

== Managerial career ==
Osmanhodžić had a short stint as Sloboda Tuzla's caretaker manager between November and December 2009. In September 2023, he was named caretaker manager of relegation threatened Bosnian Premier League side Tuzla City, having previously worked as the club's assistant manager. Osmanhodžić was replaced as Tuzla City manager by Slavko Petrović.

== Managerial statistics ==
As of match played 16 December 2023

Team	From	To	Record							
Team	From	To	G	W	D	L	GF	GA	GD	Win %
Sloboda Tuzla (caretaker)	9 November 2009	8 December 2009	2	0	1	1	0	1	−1	0.00
Tuzla City (caretaker)	30 September 2023	31 December 2023	10	3	4	3	16	16	+0	30.00
Total			12	3	5	4	16	17	−1	25.00

== Honours ==
=== Player ===
Sarajevo

- Bosnian Cup: 2001–02, 2004–05
