= Muhamed Alaim =

Bosnian footballer

Personal information
- Full name: Muhamed Alaim
- Date of birth: 10 February 1981 (age 45)
- Place of birth: Sarajevo, SFR Yugoslavia
- Height: 1.91 m (6 ft 3 in)
- Position: Goalkeeper

Senior career*
| Years | Team | Apps | (Gls) |
| 2000–2010 | Sarajevo | 270 | (0) |
| 2010–2012 | Tarbiat Yazd | 0 | (0) |
| Total | | 270 | (0) |

International career
| 2007 | Bosnia and Herzegovina | 1 | (0) |
- * Club domestic league appearances and goals

Muhamed Alaim (born 10 February 1981) is a Bosnian retired professional football goalkeeper.

== Club career ==
Alaim played 10 years for FK Sarajevo and appeared in 270 league games for the club. He finished his career with Iranian second-tier side Tarbiat Yazd, where he played from 2010 to 2012.

== International career ==
On the national level, Alaim has made one appearance for the Bosnia and Herzegovina national team on 22 August 2007, in a friendly match against Croatia as a second-half substitute for Adnan Gušo.

== After football ==
Currently he is the founder and a coach at his goalkeeping school in Sarajevo. The school accepts all the way from young goalkeepers to veterans.

He is also active in politics as a member of the Party of Democratic Action (SDA).

== Honours ==
=== Club ===
Sarajevo

- Bosnian Premier League: 2006–07
- Bosnian Cup: 2001–02, 2004–05
