= Edin Šaranović =

Bosnian footballer (1976–2021)

Personal information
- Full name: Edin Šaranović
- Date of birth: 8 March 1976
- Place of birth: Tešanj, Bosnia and Herzegovina, Yugoslavia
- Date of death: 22 August 2021 (aged 45)
- Place of death: Munich, Bavaria, Germany
- Height: 1.74 m (5 ft 9 in)
- Position: Forward

Senior career*
Years	Team	Apps	(Gls)
1998–1999	TOŠK Tešanj		
1999–2002	FK Sarajevo	70	(30)
2002	Pogoń Szczecin	12	(1)
2003–2005	Kamen Ingrad	40	(13)
2005–2006	Slaven Belupo	33	(2)
2006	FK Sarajevo	12	(5)
2007	Međimurje	15	(7)
2008	Primorje	26	(8)
2008–2009	Zadar	28	(5)
2010	Olimpik	12	(2)
2010	Sloboda Tuzla	1	(0)
2011–2012	Pobjeda Tešanjka		

International career
2001	Bosnia and Herzegovina	2	(0)

Managerial career
- 2016: TOŠK Tešanj
- * Club domestic league appearances and goals

Edin Šaranović (8 March 1976 — 22 August 2021) was a Bosnian footballer who played as a forward.

== Club career ==
Šaranović has played for NK Kamen Ingrad, NK Slaven Belupo and NK Međimurje in the Croatian Prva HNL and FK Sarajevo in the Bosnian Premier League. He also had a spell with Pogoń Szczecin in the Polish Ekstraklasa, and with FC Sokol Saratov in Russia.

He played for NK Primorje in the Slovenian PrvaLiga before moving to NK Zadar.

After spells abroad, he returned to Bosnia and Herzegovina and went on to play for FK Olimpic Sarajevo, FK Sloboda Tuzla and NK Tešanjka before finishing his playing career in 2012.

== International career ==
Šaranović made his debut for Bosnia and Herzegovina in an August 2001 friendly match against Malta and has earned a total of 2 caps, scoring no goals. His second and final international was a September 2001 World Cup qualification match against Israel.

== Post-playing career ==
On 1 February 2016, Šaranović was named manager of NK TOŠK Tešanj. He became president of the club later that year with Igor Remetić succeeding him as manager.

== Death ==
He died on 22 August 2021 after suffering a heart attack several days earlier.
