= Mirzet Krupinac =

Bosnian-Herzegovinian footballer

Personal information
- Date of birth: 6 November 1973 (age 52)
- Place of birth: Zvornik, SFR Yugoslavia
- Position: Defender

Senior career*
Years	Team	Apps	(Gls)
1997–2000	Drina Zvornik	61	(2)
2000–2003	FK Sarajevo	59	(3)
2003–2004	Austria Lustenau	23	(0)
2004–2005	Zagorje	19	(0)
2005–2006	Sloboda Tuzla	20	(1)
2006–2008	Schwanenstadt	56	(1)
2008–2009	SV Gmunden	17	(0)
2009–2010	Union Pettenbach	9	(0)
2011–2013	Schwanenstadt	25	(5)
Total		264	(7)

International career
2001	Bosnia and Herzegovina	2	(0)
- * Club domestic league appearances and goals

Mirzet Krupinac (born 6 November 1973) is a Bosnian retired professional footballer.

== Club career ==
He played the final years of his career in the Austrian lower and amateur leagues.

== International career ==
Kruprinac made two appearances for the Bosnia and Herzegovina national team at the Sahara Millennium Cup in India, in January 2001.
