= Damir Mirvić =

Bosnian footballer

Personal information
- Full name: Damir Mirvić
- Date of birth: 30 November 1982 (age 43)
- Place of birth: Bihać, SFR Yugoslavia
- Height: 1.85 m (6 ft 1 in)
- Position: Centre back

Team information
- Current team: KSC Excelsior Mariakerke

Senior career*
Years	Team	Apps	(Gls)
2001–2002	Jedinstvo Bihać	7	(1)
2002–2005	FK Sarajevo	100	(0)
2005–2007	KAA Gent	42	(0)
2007–2011	KSV Roeselare	123	(5)
2011–2013	Wezet	60	(0)
2014–2016	SK Maldegem		
2016–	KSCE Mariakerke		
Total		332	(6)

International career^{‡}
2002	Bosnia and Herzegovina U-21	9	(0)
12.8.2009.	Bosnia	0	(0)
- * Club domestic league appearances and goals as of 8 July 2024 ‡ National team caps and goals as of 8 July 2024.

Damir Mirvić (born 30 November 1982) is a Bosnian football defender, who plays in the Belgian amateur leagues.

== Club career ==
After spending time at FK Sarajevo, KAA Gent, KSV Roeselare and Wezet (Visé) he joined SK Maldegem Wezet in January 2014 after a few months out of contract. In summer 2016, he moved to Excelsior Mariakerke.

== International career ==
He was called up by Miroslav Blažević to the Bosnia and Herzegovina national team in 2009, but did not play.
