= Orašje City Stadium =

Multi-use stadium in Orašje, Bosnia and Herzegovina

Gradski Stadion
- Interactive map of Gradski Stadion
- Location: Orašje, Bosnia and Herzegovina
- Coordinates: 45°01′45″N 18°41′14″E
- Owner: HNK Orašje
- Operator: HNK Orašje
- Capacity: 3,000

Tenant
- HNK Orašje

Gradski stadion (Cyrillic: Градски стадион, "City Stadium") is a multi-use stadium in Orašje, Bosnia and Herzegovina. It is currently used mostly for football matches and is the home ground of HNK Orašje. The stadium holds 3,000.
