= Mokri Dolac Stadium =

Football stadium in Posušje, Bosnia and Herzegovina

Stadion Mokri Dolac
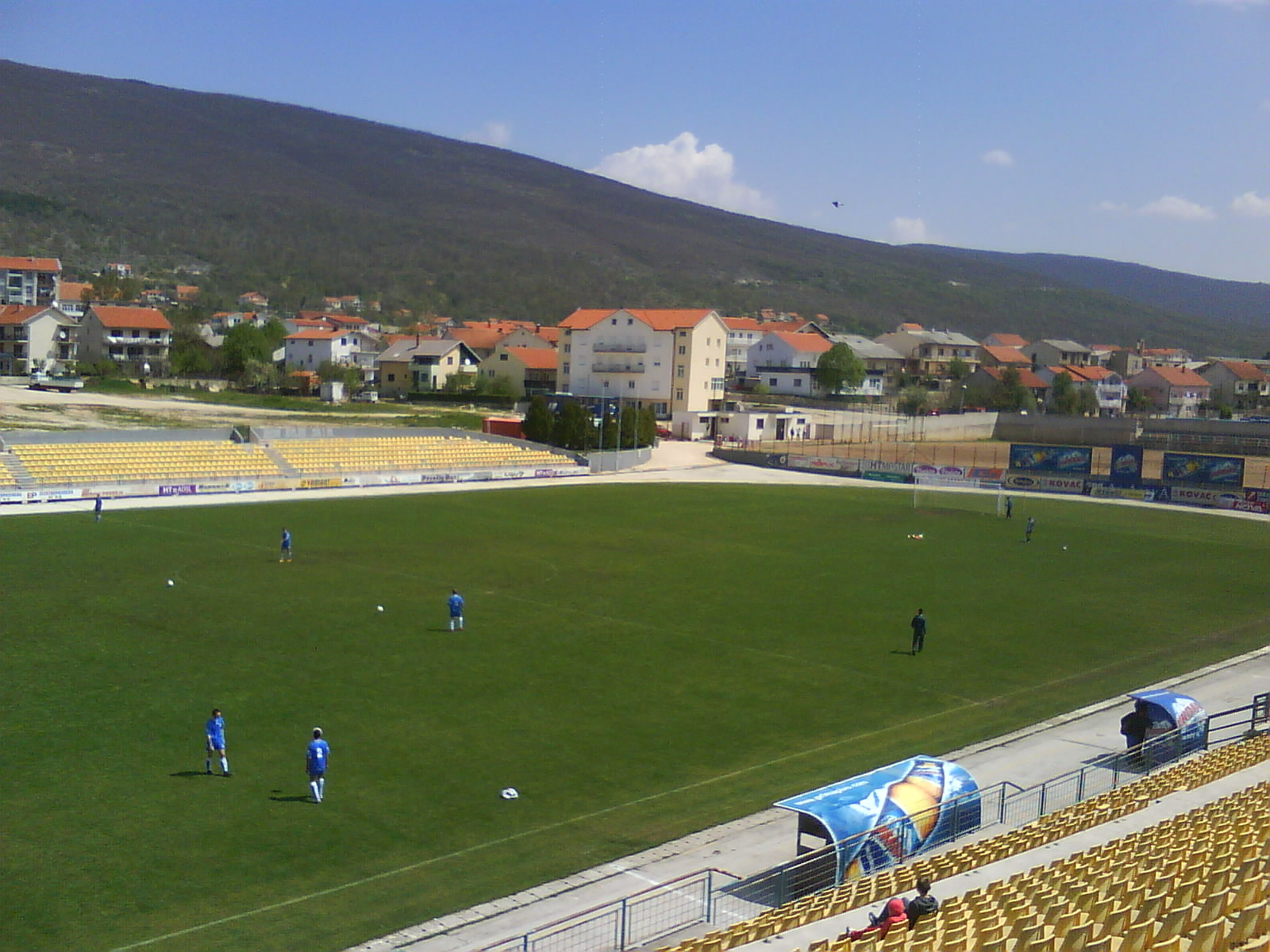
- Interactive map of Stadion Mokri Dolac
- Full name: Mokri Dolac stadium
- Location: Posušje, Bosnia and Herzegovina
- Coordinates: 43°28′10″N 17°19′40″E
- Owner: City of Posušje
- Capacity: 5,040
- Surface: Grass
- Field size: 106 x 69 m

Construction
- Renovated: 1998
- Expanded: 2000s

Tenant
- HŠK Posušje

Mokri Dolac Stadium is a multi-purpose stadium in Posušje, Bosnia and Herzegovina. It is currently used mostly for football matches and is the home ground of HŠK Posušje. The stadium has a capacity of 5,040.
