= Ferid Idrizović =

Bosnian-Herzegovinian footballer

Personal information
- Date of birth: 10 September 1982 (age 44)
- Place of birth: Bijelo Polje, SR Montenegro, SFR Yugoslavia
- Height: 1.85 m (6 ft 1 in)
- Position: Midfielder

Senior career*
Years	Team	Apps	(Gls)
1998–2005	FK Sarajevo	67	(4)
2005	Brunei FA		(4)
2005–2006	Posušje	23	(3)
2006	Teuta	5	(0)
2007	FK Sarajevo	0	(0)
2007	Žepče	11	(1)
2008	Kreševo-Stanić		
2008–2009	Travnik	2	(0)
2009	Dečić	15	(2)
2010	Rudar Pljevlja	26	(1)
2011	Brantford Galaxy	15	(3)
2012–2013	Berane		
Total		164	(18)

International career
2003	Bosnia and Herzegovina U21	1	(0)
- * Club domestic league appearances and goals as of 9.3.2024.

Ferid Idrizović (born September 10, 1982) is a Bosnian former footballer who played in the Premier League of Bosnia and Herzegovina, Malaysia Premier League, Albanian Superliga, Montenegrin First League, and the Canadian Soccer League.

== Club career ==
Born in Montenegro, Idrizović began his career in 1998 with FK Sarajevo in the Premier League of Bosnia and Herzegovina. Where he played in the 2002–03 UEFA Cup against Beşiktaş J.K. In 2005, he went overseas to Brunei to play in the Malaysia Premier League. Later that year, he returned to Bosnia to play with NK Posušje, then he was transferred to KF Teuta Durrës of the Albanian Superliga. After his tenure in Albania he returned to Bosnia to play with Sarajevo, NK Žepče, NK Kreševo-Stanić, and NK Travnik. In 2009, he went abroad to play in the Montenegrin First League with FK Dečić, and FK Rudar Pljevlja. During his stint with Rudar Pljevlja he played in the 2010–11 UEFA Champions League against Litex Lovech. In 2011, he went overseas to Canada to play with Brantford Galaxy in the Canadian Soccer League. At the conclusion of the CSL season he returned to Montenegro to play and retire with FK Berane.
