= NK Troglav 1918 Livno =

- Full name: Nogometni klub Troglav 1918 Livno
- Founded: 1918 refounded on 17 September 2014
- Ground: Zgona, Livno
- Capacity: 1,000 (836 seats)
- Chairman: Dubravko Pervan
- Manager: Danijel Krivić
- League: Second league of the FBiH (third level)
Home colours	Away colours

NK Troglav 1918 is a football club from Livno, Bosnia and Herzegovina. It is a member of the Second League of the Federation of Bosnia and Herzegovina – group South, third level of football in the country.

The club was founded in 1921, as part of previously founded Sports Club Troglav (Športski Klub Troglav), that was founded in 1918. After club went bankrupt in 2014, it was refounded and now is known as Troglav 1918.

== Troglav (1918–2014) ==
=== Foundation and early years ===
Sports club Troglav was founded in 1918. Its football section started to play three years later, in 1921.

In the start, it only played friendlies against clubs from cities surrounding Livno: Bugojno, Glamoč, Mostar, and from Dalmatia.

=== In Yugoslavia ===
After World War II and the creation of Yugoslavia, club started to play in Yugoslavian league system. In 1947 it was renamed to SD Vojin Zirojević, after a local war hero. Next year Troglav saw another name change – now it was FD Cincar, after mountain that rises north of Livno. It only lasted until 1949 when the old name was taken back.

During the period of Yugoslavia club played in lower leagues, ranging from sixth to third level. Biggest success came in 1971–72 season. Troglav won its group and got promoted to Yugoslavia Second League – group South. Immediately, Troglav got relegated and never returned again. To make things worse, next season it got relegated again, now from third to fourth level.

=== In Bosnia and Herzegovina ===
After the Yugoslav Wars in the first part of the nineties and breakup of Yugoslavia, Troglav started to play in Bosnia and Herzegovina football leagues. For start, it played seven seasons in Herzeg-Bosnia's First League with biggest success came in 1997 when it won Herzeg-Bosnia Football Cup. Best league result was second-place finish the same season.

After ninth place in 1999–00 season, Troglav earned a spot in 2000–01 edition of nation's top flight newly created Premier League. After 10th place in debut season it finished 13th out of 16 clubs next year and got relegated to First League of the FBiH. Most notable performance in those two season happened on 18 April 2001 when Troglav defeated Sarajevo at Koševo stadium. It was 1–3 with all three goals from Robert Regvar. In first season in First League of the FBiH Troglav got relegated to the Second League of the FBiH for 2003–04 season. In 2004–05 season it was promoted back to Federation's first division, but again it got relegated after four seasons. Last success came in 2011–12 season when club won the title in its group of Second League and got promoted to the First League. In 2012–13 the club managed to stay in the league after promoted team opted not to take part in 2013–14 season, but that season meant Troglav's end. After 18 games, due to many problems, club pulled out of competition and later that year it was liquidated.

==== Season by season record ====
Season	League	Level	Position	G	W	D	L	G+	G-	Notes
1994	1st League of Herzeg-Bosnia – South	1	4/9	8	5	1	2	19	6	
1994–95	1st League of Herzeg-Bosnia – Herzegovina	1	6/11	20	6	6	8	19	32	
1995–96	1st League of Herzeg-Bosnia – Herzeg-Bosnia, West	1	7/8	14	3	2	9	10	21	
1996–97	1st League of Herzeg-Bosnia	1	2/16	30	17	5	8	51	22	
1997–98	1st League of Herzeg-Bosnia	1	5/16	30	16	4	10	50	26	
1998–99	1st League of Herzeg-Bosnia	1	6/14	26	12	1	13	36	31	
1999-00	1st League of Herzeg-Bosnia	1	9/14	26	10	1	15	27	40	
2000–01	Premier League of BiH	1	10/22	42	19	8	15	59	57	
2001–02	Premier League of BiH	1	13/16	30	8	8	14	33	49	relegated
2002–03	1st League of the FBiH	2	15/19	36	12	7	17	45	52	relegated
2003–04	2nd League of the FBiH – Center II	3	3/13	24	14	4	6	47	26	
2004–05	2nd League of the FBiH – South	3	1/16	30	22	1	7	91	26	promoted
2005–06	1st League of the FBiH	2	6/16	30	13	8	9	45	42	
2006–07	1st League of the FBiH	2	5/16	30	14	5	11	44	33	
2007–08	1st League of the FBiH	2	7/16	30	13	5	12	36	31	
2008–09	1st League of the FBiH	2	12/16	30	12	2	16	36	52	relegated
2009–10	2nd League of the FBiH – South	3	2/16	30	17	4	7	68	27	
2010–11	2nd League of the FBiH – South	3	5/15	28	14	3	11	64	35	
2011–12	2nd League of the FBiH – South	3	1/16	30	23	4	3	97	19	promoted
2012–13	1st League of the FBiH	2	12/16	28	9	7	12	30	37	
2013–14	1st League of the FBiH	2	16/16	30	1	2	27	8	98	relegated^{1}

G – games played; W – games won; D – games drawn; L – games lost; G+ – goals for; G- – goals against
^{1} In 2013–14 season Troglav pulled out of competition after 18 games. All remaining fixtures were cancelled and Troglav was assigned 0–3 loss for each of those.

=== Honours ===
Second League of the FBiH – group South

- Winner (2): 2004–05 (then known as league Center 2), 2011–12

Croatian Republic of Herzeg-Bosnia Football Cup

- Winner (1): 1996–1997

Croatian Republic of Herzeg-Bosnia Football League

- Runner-up: 1996–97

== Troglav 1918 (2014–) ==
On 17 September 2014 it was announced that new club was founded in Livno. It will play at the same stadium, will use the same logo and the same colors but its name will be slightly different as it will contain year that the extinct club was founded in – 1918. It started to play official games same Fall in lowest level in its region – fourth level, Intercantonal league of Canton 10 and West Herzegovina Canton. Youth categories, four of them (U-19, U-17, U-15, U-13), continued to play in same leagues they played before.

In its first season club easily won the title winning 34 out of 36 possible points and gained promotion to the Second League of the Federation of Bosnia and Herzegovina. In the three following season the club finished each time in lower bottom of the league table being far away from promotion.

=== Season by season record ===
==== League ====
Season	League	Level	Position	G	W	D	L	G+	G-	Notes
2014–15	HBŽ/ZHŽ Intercantonal League	4	1/4	12	11	1	0	22	3	Promoted
2015–16	FBiH Second League – South	3	11/16	30	11	4	15	46	46	
2016–17	FBiH Second League – South	3	9/15	28	10	5	13	38	46	
2017–18	FBiH Second League – South	3	9/15	28	10	6	12	38	36	
2018–19	FBiH Second League – South	3	9/14	26	8	5	13	42	50	
2019–20	FBiH Second League – South	3	7/15	13	5	3	5	17	23	Season abandoned^{1}
2020–21	FBiH Second League – South	3	7/13	24	11	4	9	42	35	
2021–22	FBiH Second League – South	3	7/14	26	10	4	12	45	42	
2022–23	FBiH Second League – South	3	3/14	26	13	7	6	44	25	
2023–24	FBiH Second League – South	3	6/15	28	12	6	10	51	41	
2024–25	FBiH Second League – South	3	4/16	30	17	4	9	65	37	
2025–26	FBiH Second League – South	3	/							
Totals (2014-15 to 2023-24)				227	96	42	89	360	324	

G – games played; W – games won; D – games drawn; L – games lost; G+ – goals for; G- – goals against
^{1} The 2019–20 season was interrupted due to the COVID-19 pandemic. Decision to stop football activities in Bosnia and Herzegovina came just before start of second part of the season and in May it was announced that no football league in the country will be continued for 2019–20 season. In June it was announced that all standings before the break are final.

==== Cup ====
National cup qualification method:

- If 1st level team, direct berth to National cup;
- If 2nd level team, Entity Cup (one round) → National cup;
- If 3rd or lower-level team, Canton cup (multiple rounds) → Entity Cup (two rounds) → National cup

Season	Cup competition	G	W	D	L	G+	G-	Notes
2014–15	Did not take part.							
2015–16	Federation of BiH Cup (entity cup)^{1}	1	0	0	1	0	3	Eliminated in First round.
2016–17	Did not take part.							
2017–18	Did not take part.							
2018–19	Did not take part.							
2019-20	Did not take part.							
2020-21	Did not take part.							
2021-22	HBŽ Cup (canton cup)	1	0	1	0	1	1	Eliminated (after penalties) in Quarter-final^{2, 3}
2022-23	HBŽ Cup (canton cup)	3	2	0	1	10	3	Eliminated in Final^{3}
2023-24	HBŽ Cup (canton cup)	1	0	0	1	0	2	Eliminated in Quarter-final^{3}
2024-25	HBŽ Canton Cup (canton cup)	2	2	0	0	13	0	Won Canton cup, qualified to Federation of BiH Cup^{3}
2024-25	Federation of BiH Cup (entity cup)	2	1	1	0	3	1	Qualified to Bosnia and Herzegovina Cup
2024-25	Bosnia and Herzegovina Cup (national cup)	1	0	0	1	0	9	Eliminated in First round
2025-26	HBŽ Cup (canton cup)	3	3	0	0	12	2	Won Canton cup, qualified to Federation of BiH Cup^{3}
2025-26	Federation of BiH Cup (entity cup)	1	0	0	1	2	4	Eliminated

G – games played; W – games won; D – games drawn; L – games lost; G+ – goals for; G- – goals against
^{1} Nominated to play in the FBiH Cup by the Canton football association as no Canton cup was held.
^{2} Eliminated after penalties.
^{3} Canton cup is played one season in advance, so in table season 2022-23 means that Canton cup is played during 2021–22 season

=== Honours ===
Intercantonal League of HBŽ/ZHŽ

- Winner (1): 2024–25

Herzeg-Bosnia Canton Cup

- Winner (2): 2024–25, 2025-26

Youth League of BiH – U-17

- Winner (1): 2014–15
- Runner-up (1): 2022–23
- Third place (1): 2015–16 (host of the Final four tournament)

== Women's team ==
Since 2015, besides men's sections, the club has women's section too, known as ŽNK Troglav 1918 Livno (ŽNK stands for Women's football club). At start they didn't take part in any competition, but since 2016–17 season girls take part in second level of women's football in Federation of Bosnia and Herzegovina, third level in the country.

== Facilities ==
Troglav 1918 play its home games at the local stadium named Zgona. Stadium was built in the 1960s. After decaying for long time, in 2015 the Club started the reconstruction. Concrete stands were renovated and 836 seats were added with plans to cover central part of the stand. Stadium now fulfills criteria for all levels beside country's top level.

Beside football pitch, there is also another, smaller pitch used for trainings only. Around main pitch there is gravel running track. Clubhouse contains locker rooms, club offices, gym and cafe bar.

In 2020 a brand new artificial turf field was opened next to the stadium, after almost 20 years of planning. In 2021 floodlights were installed and teams can train all year, all day long.
