= Sarajevo Tobacco Factory =

Bosnian tobacco company

- Sarajevo Tobacco Factory - Fabrika Duhana Sarajevo
- Type: Public
- Industry: Tobacco
- Founded: 1880; 146 years ago
- Headquarters: Sarajevo, Bosnia and Herzegovina
- Products: Cigarettes
- Revenue: €54.43 million (2017)
- Net income: €33.28 million (2017)
- Total equity: €152.05 million (2017)
- Number of employees: 244 (2017)
- Website: www.fabrikaduhana.ba

Sarajevo Tobacco Factory (Bosnian: Fabrika duhana Sarajevo; abbr. FDS) was a cigarette producer with headquarters in Sarajevo, Bosnia and Herzegovina.

== History ==
The Sarajevo Tobacco Factory was founded in 1880, only two years after the occupation of Bosnia and Herzegovina by the Austro-Hungarian Empire in 1878. FDS was one of the first four industries in Bosnia and Herzegovina. For eighty years, FDS was located in Marijin Dvor, nowadays, the center of the city. At its founding, FDS consisted of only two buildings, production and administration. As production grew, the FDS complex became larger. It was finally formed in 1891, when the last of ten buildings was constructed. This situation remained until the middle of the last century.

As the complex of FDS became larger, the number of employees also increased. In that early stage, it was mostly unskilled female labor. The first products of FDS were the cut tobacco packets produced manually in the device called “avan”. The tobacco used for these packets was of a different grade, and the packets were also different. During the Austro-Hungarian period, this product was exported.

The production of cigarettes started in 1882. They were produced manually until 1905 when the first automatic cigarette maker was obtained. By the beginning of World War I, FDS marketed 23 brands. They were packed in boxes made of wood, tin and cardboard. The smallest packet contained five and the largest one hundred cigarettes.

FDS stagnated between the two world wars, specially in respect to its equipment. Still, during that period 55 different machines were provided, some of them intended for fabrication of the cut tobacco packets and cigarettes and the rest were machine tools for the workshop. The production and packing of the cut tobacco and several brands of oval and round cigarettes continued also in this period. Cigarettes were packed in packets of 100 and even 500.

At the very beginning of the World War II the cut tobacco production decreased due to lower market demand. In this period, cigarette production also varied from year to year. During the war, FDS did not stop production, but it was dictated by the occupier. Ever since its foundation, for more than one century now, FDS has experienced many turbulent periods caused by the change of government and different social and political systems, but it has never stopped operating and producing.

=== After World War 2 ===
FDS achieved success, not only in the market of SR Bosnia and Herzegovina, but also abroad including Egypt, Russia, Turkey and Japan.

The policy of FDS was to rely on its own labor. In 1946, the first machine (an automatic carton cutting machine) was constructed. Those machines, invented and constructed by the employees of FDS, were used in FDS and also sold to other companies in the former Yugoslavia. The machines designed in FDS include Glibo I to Glibo V. Today, the machines are primarily important as museum pieces, as they indicate the technological process in the factory.

In order to extend and modernize the facilities, a new factory complex was built in 1960 in the Pofalići area, occupying about 40 000 m^{2}. The complex consisted of several buildings and reached its final appearance in 1971, when the construction was completed. Construction was completely financed by the employees of FDS, setting a precedent at that time and in such an environment.

From 1971 the factory was modernized, with new, modern equipment to meet new technologies in the production of cigarettes. In that way the factory became one of the most modern tobacco plants in Europe and a leader in the area of former Yugoslavia. All the activities intended for the upgrade of the production process and education of the employees resulted in the signing of a contract with Philip Morris to make Marlboro cigarettes in 1970. Implementation of this contract started in 1971 and was successful until 1992, when it was broken up due to the war.

In the history of FDS, several periods may be identified:

1. The Austro-Hungarian period, when the factory operated to meet the requirements of the ruling Austro-Hungarian authorities.
2. The Kingdom of Yugoslavia, when the factory considerably stagnated due to the monopolistic treatment by authorities from Belgrade.
3. After the Second World War, when FDS recorded very good business results despite frequent unfavorable working conditions. During this period, which lasted for almost fifty years, FDS became materially a very strong factory and employed highly skilled workers who managed to keep up with European and world trends in the tobacco industry.
4. The most difficult period for FDS was during the Bosnian war, from 1992 to 1995. Although severely damaged, FDS did not stop production. After the company suffered commercial losses for several years in a row, laid off employees and discontinued cigarette brands, the Austrian company CID Adriatic Investments GmbH bought out the company's shares.

As of May 27, 2022, the factory has closed and it is unknown whether production will start again.

== Brands ==
The brands produced by FDS until now are:

- 8 (Eight)
- Alfa
- AurA extra
- AurA lights
- AurA super lights
- Bond
- Bosna
- Code
- Damen
- Drava
- Drina
- Drina-denifine
- Drina jedina bijela
- Drina jedina zlatna
- Drina lights
- Drina super lights
- Guslar
- Flor
- Foča
- Hercegovina
- Ibar
- Internacional
- Lara
- Marlboro
- Morava
- Morava-crvena
- Mostar
- Multi Nova
- Neretva
- Sarajevo
- Sarajka
- Sedef
- Skend
- Specijal
- Start
- Sutjestka
- Štefanija
- Tigra medium
- Vrbas
- Wind
- Zeta

== See also ==
- List of companies of Bosnia and Herzegovina
