= Muhidin Zukić =

Bosnia and Herzegovina footballer

Personal information
- Full name: Muhidin Zukić
- Date of birth: 22 September 1971 (age 55)
- Place of birth: Sarajevo, SFR Yugoslavia
- Position: Central defender

Senior career*
Years	Team	Apps	(Gls)
1989–1992	FK Sarajevo	0	(0)
1992–1998	Rudar Kakanj		
1998–2008	FK Sarajevo	295	(14)
Total		395	(7)

International career
1999	Bosnia and Herzegovina	1	(0)
- * Club domestic league appearances and goals

Muhidin Zukić (born 22 September 1971) is a retired Bosnian-Herzegovinian professional footballer that spent his whole career as a member of FK Sarajevo, whom he captained. He received one cap for Bosnia and Herzegovina.

== Club career ==
Zukić started his career at hometown club FK Sarajevo, but did not make it to the first team and joined Rudar Kakanj in 1992, only to return to Sarajevo in 1998.

He scored 14 goals in 298 official matches for FK Sarajevo and scored the opening goal in the 2002 domestic cup final. He start working for the club's football academy in 2013.

== International career ==
He made one appearance for Bosnia and Herzegovina in an August 1999 friendly match away against Liechtenstein.
