= HNK Orašje =

Orašje
- Full name: Hrvatski nogometni klub Orašje
- Nickname(s): Labudovi ("Swans")
- Founded: 1996; 29 years ago
- Ground: Gradski stadion ("City Stadium"), Orašje
- Capacity: 3,000
- Chairman: Željko Baotić
- Manager: Dario Damjanović
- League: First League of FBiH
- 2021–22: First League of FBiH, 8th
Home colours	Away colours

HNK Orašje (Croatian: Hrvatski nogometni klub Orašje, lit. 'Croatian Football Club Orašje') is a professional association football club from the town of Orašje that is situated in Bosnia and Herzegovina. The club was founded in 1996, being one of the newest to play in the Premier League of Bosnia and Herzegovina. Orašje plays its home matches on the Gradski Stadion ("City Stadium"), which has a capacity of 3,000 seats. The team's colours are red and white. The club currently plays in the First League of the Federation of Bosnia and Herzegovina.

After winning the Bosnian cup competition in 2006, they secured a place in the UEFA Cup for the first time in their history. They were kicked out in the first preliminary round after two matches with Slovenian side NK Domžale. The Cup title of 2006 is their only big result so far. The fans of the club are known as the Red Warriors.

== Honours ==
=== Domestic ===
==== League ====
- First League of the Federation of Bosnia and Herzegovina
  - Runners-up (1): 2009–10
- Second League of the Federation of Bosnia and Herzegovina
  - Winners (1): 2012–13 (north)

==== Cups ====
- Bosnia and Herzegovina Cup
  - Winners (1): 2005–06
  - Runners-up (1): 1997–98
- Herzeg-Bosnia Cup
  - Winners (2): 1997–98, 1999–2000
  - Runners-up (1): 1996–97

== European record ==
=== Summary ===
Competition	Pld	W	D	L	GF	GA	Last season played
UEFA Cup	2	0	0	2	0	7	2006–07
Total	2	0	0	2	0	7	–

Source: uefa.com, Last updated on 5 July 2013
Pld = Matches played; W = Matches won; D = Matches drawn; L = Matches lost; GF = Goals for; GA = Goals against. Defunct competitions indicated in italics.

=== By season ===
Season	Competition	Round	Opponent	Home	Away	Agg.
2006–07	UEFA Cup	QR1	(Slovenia) Domžale	0–2	0–5	0–7
