= List of Bosnia and Herzegovina football champions =

Bosnian League (1st tier)
- First League (1994–2000)
- Premier League (2000–present)

Country
- Bosnia and Herzegovina

Founded
- 1994

Number of teams
- 10 (since 2025–26 season)

Current champions
- Borac (2025–26)

Most successful club
- Zrinjski (9 championships)

The Bosnia and Herzegovina football champions are the winners of the highest league in Bosnia and Herzegovina men's football, which has been called the Bosnian Premier League since the 2000–01 season.

Zrinjski have won nine titles, the most of any club, and have been the dominant side throughout much of the 2010s and 2020s. Željezničar rank second with six titles, and were particularly successful in the early 2000s and early 2010s, notably under manager Amar Osim. Sarajevo are third with five titles. Borac follow with four titles and have emerged as one of the more successful clubs of the 2020s. Čelik are fifth with three titles, while Široki Brijeg have won two.

Čelik and Zrinjski are the only sides to have won the league title in three consecutive seasons.

== List of champions ==
=== History ===
In 1923, the first edition of leagues was organised in the Kingdom of Yugoslavia where regional championships were also played, besides the top-level national Yugoslav Football Championship. The clubs of the Drina Banovina, part of Littoral Banovina and Vrbas Banovina, territorially similar to present-day Bosnia and Herzegovina, played within the Sarajevo Football Subassociation League until 1939. The champions of the Subassociation Leagues were granted a place in the qualifiers for the Yugoslav Championship, at the top national level. SAŠK (1923, 1924, 1925, 1926, 1927, 1928, 1930–31), Slavija Sarajevo (1929, 1930, 1932–33, 1934–35, 1935–36, 1936–37, 1937–38, 1938–39, 1939–40), Krajišnik Banja Luka (1935–36) were the clubs to manage to participate in the national league, first in 1923 when the championship was played in a cup system. In 1939, the Yugoslav league system was changed by creating separate Serbian and Croatian-Slovenian Leagues, which would serve as qualifying leagues for the final phase of the Yugoslav Championship. The clubs from the Sarajevo Subassociation played their qualifications to the Serbian League. However, Slavija participated in 1939–40 (3rd place) and 1940–41 (9th place) and played their qualifications to the Croatian-Slovenian League. However, SAŠK managed to participate and did it on both occasions, in 1939–40 (5th place) and 1940–41 (5th place). That would be the last season before the beginning of World War II.

==== Royal League (1921–1941) ====
The clubs from the territory of Drina Banovina, part of Littoral Banovina and Vrbas Banovina (belonging to the Kingdom of Yugoslavia) had a league organised by the Sarajevo Football Subassociation. The winner had direct access to the Yugoslav Championship.

Season	Champions
1921	Hajduk Sarajevo
1922	SAŠK Sarajevo
1923	SAŠK Sarajevo
1924	SAŠK Sarajevo
1925	SAŠK Sarajevo
1926	SAŠK Sarajevo
1927	SAŠK Sarajevo
1928	SAŠK Sarajevo
1929	Slavija Sarajevo
1930	Slavija Sarajevo
1931	SAŠK Sarajevo
1932	Not Finished
1933	SAŠK Sarajevo
1934	Not Finished
1935	Slavija Sarajevo; SAŠK Sarajevo
1936	Slavija Sarajevo
1937	SAŠK Sarajevo
1938	SAŠK Sarajevo
1939	SAŠK Sarajevo
1940	Hajduk Sarajevo
1941	Hajduk Sarajevo

==== As part of Croatia (WWII) ====
Season	Champions
1941	Not Finished - SAŠK Sarajevo (9th place)
1942	SAŠK Sarajevo (Group D)
1943	SAŠK Sarajevo (Sarajevo championship); Hrvoje Banja Luka (Banja Luka championship)
1944	SAŠK Sarajevo (Sarajevo championship); Banja Luka (Banja Luka championship)

=== National Competitions ===
==== War in Bosnia and Herzegovina ====
After the breakup of Yugoslavia, and following proclamation of independence in late winter 1992, the Bosnian Football Association (N/FSBiH) applied for membership with FIFA and UEFA. Meanwhile, due to the outbreak of the Bosnian War in April 1992, no games were played in the 1992–93 season. In late 1993 some parts of the country re-launched football competitions with reduced scope. But just as the country was divided along ethnic lines, so was football.

In 1993, Bosnian Croats launched the Football Federation of Herzeg-Bosnia and its own First League of Herzeg-Bosnia, in which only Croat clubs competed on a parochial scale within the limits of West Herzegovina and few other enclaves. In the same year, Bosnian Serbs organized the First League of the Republika Srpska on a territory held by the Republika Srpska regime. Only football on territory under the control of the Republic of Bosnia and Herzegovina institutions and auspices of the N/FSBiH, at the time consequently with Bosniak majority, apart from a brief competition for the season 1994–95 (won by Čelik), came to a standstill. Competition under N/FSBiH auspices did not resume until the 1995–96 season when the Bosnian First League was officially launched.

==== First League (1994–2000) ====
Season	Champions (number of titles)	Runners-up	Third place	Winning manager
1994–95	Čelik (1)	Sarajevo (1)	Bosna Visoko (1)	(Bosnia and Herzegovina) Nermin Hadžiahmetović
1995–96	Čelik (2)	Radnički Lukavac (1)	Sloboda Tuzla (1)	(Bosnia and Herzegovina) Nermin Hadžiahmetović
1996–97	Čelik (3)	Sarajevo (2)	Bosna Visoko (2)	(Bosnia and Herzegovina) Kemal Hafizović
1997–98	Željezničar (1)	Sarajevo (3)	— (Note: Champion was decided via a play-off between the best placed teams of the Bosnian First League and the First League of Herzeg-Bosnia.)	(Bosnia and Herzegovina) Enver Hadžiabdić
1998–99	Sarajevo (1)	Bosna Visoko (1)	Rudar Kakanj (1)	(Bosnia and Herzegovina) Nermin Hadžiahmetović
1999–2000	Brotnjo (1)	Budućnost (1)	—	(Bosnia and Herzegovina) Ivo Ištuk

==== Premier League (2000–present) ====
Season	Champions (number of titles)	Runners-up	Third place	Winning manager
2000–01	Željezničar (2)	Brotnjo (1)	Sarajevo (1)	(Bosnia and Herzegovina) Amar Osim
2001–02	Željezničar (3)	Široki Brijeg (1)	Brotnjo (1)	(Bosnia and Herzegovina) Amar Osim
2002–03	Leotar (1)	Željezničar (1)	Sarajevo (2)	(Serbia and Montenegro) Milan Jovin
2003–04	Široki Brijeg (1)	Željezničar (2)	Sarajevo (3)	(Bosnia and Herzegovina) Ivo Ištuk
2004–05	Zrinjski (1)	Željezničar (3)	Široki Brijeg (1)	(Bosnia and Herzegovina) Franjo Džidić
2005–06	Široki Brijeg (2)	Sarajevo (4)	Zrinjski (1)	(Bosnia and Herzegovina) Ivica Barbarić
2006–07	Sarajevo (2)	Zrinjski (1)	Slavija (1)	(Bosnia and Herzegovina) Husref Musemić
2007–08	Modriča (1)	Široki Brijeg (2)	Čelik (1)	(Serbia) Slaviša Božičić
2008–09	Zrinjski (2)	Slavija (1)	Sloboda Tuzla (1)	(Bosnia and Herzegovina) Dragan Jović
2009–10	Željezničar (4)	Široki Brijeg (3)	Borac (1)	(Bosnia and Herzegovina) Amar Osim
2010–11	Borac (1)	Sarajevo (5)	Željezničar (1)	(Bosnia and Herzegovina) Vlado Jagodić
2011–12	Željezničar (5)	Široki Brijeg (4)	Borac (2)	(Bosnia and Herzegovina) Amar Osim
2012–13	Željezničar (6)	Sarajevo (6)	Borac (3)	(Bosnia and Herzegovina) Amar Osim
2013–14	Zrinjski (3)	Široki Brijeg (5)	Sarajevo (3)	(Croatia) Branko Karačić
2014–15	Sarajevo (3)	Željezničar (4)	Zrinjski (2)	(Bosnia and Herzegovina) Dženan Uščuplić
2015–16	Zrinjski (4)	Sloboda Tuzla (1)	Široki Brijeg (2)	(Bosnia and Herzegovina) Vinko Marinović
2016–17	Zrinjski (5)	Željezničar (5)	Sarajevo (4)	(Bosnia and Herzegovina) Blaž Slišković
2017–18	Zrinjski (6)	Željezničar (6)	Sarajevo (5)	(Bosnia and Herzegovina) Blaž Slišković
2018–19	Sarajevo (4)	Zrinjski (2)	Široki Brijeg (3)	(Bosnia and Herzegovina) Husref Musemić
2019–20 (Note: 2019–20 Premier League of Bosnia and Herzegovina suspended in March 2020 due to the COVID-19 pandemic in Bosnia and Herzegovina; season curtailed and final standings (including Sarajevo as champions) declared by a points-per-game ratio on 1 June 2020.)	Sarajevo (5)	Željezničar (7)	Zrinjski (3)	(Bosnia and Herzegovina) Vinko Marinović
2020–21	Borac (2)	Sarajevo (7)	Velež (1)	(Bosnia and Herzegovina) Marko Maksimović
2021–22	Zrinjski (7)	Tuzla City (1)	Borac (4)	(Bosnia and Herzegovina) Sergej Jakirović
2022–23	Zrinjski (8)	Borac (1)	Željezničar (2)	(Croatia) Krunoslav Rendulić
2023–24	Borac (3)	Zrinjski (3)	Velež (2)	(Bosnia and Herzegovina) Vinko Marinović
2024–25	Zrinjski (9)	Borac (2)	Sarajevo (6)	(Croatia) Mario Ivanković
2025–26	Borac (4)	Zrinjski (4)	Sarajevo (7)	(Bosnia and Herzegovina) Vinko Marinović

League champions also won the Bosnian Cup, i.e. the domestic Double.

== Total titles won ==
=== By club ===
Teams in bold compete in the Premier League as of the 2025–26 season.

Rank	Club	Winners	Runners-up	Winning seasons
1	**Zrinjski**	9	4	2004–05, 2008–09, 2013–14, 2015–16, 2016–17, 2017–18, 2021–22, 2022–23, 2024–25
2	**Željezničar**	6	7	1997–98, 2000–01, 2001–02, 2009–10, 2011–12, 2012–13
3	**Sarajevo**	5	7	1998–99, 2006–07, 2014–15, 2018–19, 2019–20
4	**Borac**	4	2	2010–11, 2020–21, 2023–24, 2025–26
5	Čelik	3	0	1994–95, 1995–96, 1996–97
6	**Široki Brijeg**	2	5	2003–04, 2005–06
7	Brotnjo	1	1	1999–2000
7	Modriča	1	0	2007–08
7	Leotar	1	0	2002–03

=== By city/town ===
City / Town	Championships	Clubs
Sarajevo	11	Željezničar (6), Sarajevo (5)
Mostar	9	Zrinjski (9)
Banja Luka	4	Borac (4)
Zenica	3	Čelik (3)
Široki Brijeg	2	Široki Brijeg (2)
Čitluk	1	Brotnjo (1)
Modriča	1	Modriča (1)
Trebinje	1	Leotar (1)

== See also ==
- Bosnia and Herzegovina football clubs in European competitions
- List of Bosnia and Herzegovina football first tier top scorers
- List of association football competitions
