= 2000–01 Bosnia and Herzegovina Football Cup =

Tournament details
- Country: Bosnia and Herzegovina
- Teams: 36

Final positions
- Champions: Željezničar; 2nd national cup title
- Runners-up: Sarajevo

2000–01 Bosnia and Herzegovina Football Cup was the seventh season of the Bosnia and Herzegovina's annual football cup, and a first season of the unified competition. The competition started on 2 December 2000 with the First Round and concluded on 15 June 2001 with the Final.

== First round ==
Thirty-two teams entered in the First Round. The matches were played on 2 December 2000.

Team 1	Score	Team 2
Grude	0–3	Željezničar
Blagaj	4–5	Velež
Tomislav	0–2	Čelik Zenica
Bosna Visoko	0–1	Široki Brijeg
Odžak 102	2–1	Troglav
Drina Zvornik-Živinice	0–3	Ljubuški
Iskra Bugojno	1–2	Posušje
Mramor	3–2	Budućnost Banovići
Travnik	5–0	Đerzelez
Sloboda Tuzla	5–0	Čapljina
Brotnjo	0–3	Sarajevo
Zrinjski	1–0	Rudar Kakanj
FK Vitez	2–0	Orašje
Kiseljak	3–0	Jedinstvo Bihać
Butmir	0–5	Olimpik
Podgrmeč Sanski Most	5–0	Krajina Cazin

== Second round ==
The 16 winners from the prior round enter this round. The first legs were played on 6 December and the second legs were played on 9 December 2000.

Team 1	Agg.	Team 2	1st leg	2nd leg
Posušje	2–2 (a)	Sloboda Tuzla	1–0	0–2
FK Vitez	1–1 (a)	Čelik Zenica	1–1	0–0
Mramor	3–6	Olimpik	2–1	1–5
Odžak 102	2–3	Kiseljak	1–2	1–1
Sarajevo	4–1	Zrinjski	3–0	1–1
Podgrmeč Sanski Most	1–2	Travnik	0–0	1–2
Ljubuški	1–4	Željeznićar	0–1	1–3
Velež	1–5	Široki Brijeg	1–1	0–4

== Intermediate round ==
On January 31, it was announced that 4 clubs from Srpska will join 8 clubs from the NSBIH to play off for a unified cup.

The first legs were played on 14 March and the second legs were played on 28 March 2001.

Team 1	Agg.	Team 2	1st leg	2nd leg
Boksit Milići	0–4	Posušje	0–0	0–4
Čelik Zenica	4–4 (a)	Omladinac APB Banja Luka	2–3	2–1
Radnik Bijeljina	2–3	Olimpik	0–2	2–1
Sarajevo	1–0	Kozara Gradiška	1–0	0–0

== Quarterfinals ==
The eight winners from the prior round enter this round. The first legs were played on 4 April and the second legs were played on 25 April 2001.

Team 1	Agg.	Team 2	1st leg	2nd leg
Travnik	0–5	Posušje	0–3	0–2
Široki Brijeg	3–1	Omladinac APB Banja Luka	2–1	1–0
Sarajevo	3–0	Kiseljak	3–0	0–0
Željezničar	4–0	Olimpik	4–0	0–0

== Semifinals ==
The four winners from the prior round enter this round. The first legs will be played on 9 May and the second legs were played on 25 May 2001.

Team 1	Agg.	Team 2	1st leg	2nd leg
Široki Brijeg	1–3	Željezničar	0–1	1–2
Posušje	2–4	Sarajevo	1–0	1–4

== Final ==
15 June 2001

Sarajevo	2–3	Željezničar
Repuh 19'; Šaranović 50'	Report	Adžem 43'; Alilhodžić 59'; Muharemović 78'

Stadion Koševo, Sarajevo
Attendance: 28,000
Referee: Siniša Zrnić (Zenica)

== See also ==
- 2000–01 Premier League of Bosnia and Herzegovina
