= Haris Alihodžić =

Bosnian footballer (born 1968)

Personal information
- Date of birth: 12 April 1968 (age 58)
- Place of birth: Sarajevo, SFR Yugoslavia
- Height: 1.92 m (6 ft 4 in)
- Position: Defender

Senior career*
Years	Team	Apps	(Gls)
1988–1992	Željezničar	17	(0)
1992–1993	Favoritner AC	14	(1)
1993–1994	Rapid Wien	7	(1)
1994	Antalyaspor	5	(0)
1995–1999	Mura	48	(6)
1999–2005	Željezničar	100	(9)
Total		191	(17)

International career
2002–2003	Bosnia and Herzegovina	2	(0)

Managerial career
- 2016: Željezničar (caretaker)
- 2023: Željezničar (caretaker)
- * Club domestic league appearances and goals

Haris Alihodžić (born 12 April 1968) is a Bosnian football manager and former player.

== Club career ==
For a big part of his career, Alihodžić played for hometown club Željezničar, with whom he won three Bosnian championship titles, three Bosnian Cups and three Bosnian Supercups. He also had brief spells with Rapid Wien and Favoritner AC in Austria, Antalyaspor in the Turkish Süper Lig and Mura in Slovenia.

== International career ==
Alihodžić made his senior debut for Bosnia and Herzegovina in an October 2002 friendly match against Germany and has earned a total of 2 caps, scoring no goals. His final international was a March 2003 European Championship qualification match against Luxembourg.

== Managerial and administrative career ==
=== Željezničar ===
After Edis Mulalić was sacked as manager of Željezničar, Alihodžić, the club's sporting director at the time, took over as caretaker manager on 7 May 2016. He led the team in one game, a 1–1 draw against Slavija Sarajevo in the last round of the 2015–16 Bosnian Premier League season.

On 12 July 2017, Alihodžić became the director of the youth school of Željezničar. He worked as director until July 2022, when he was replaced by Edin Ćurić.

On 1 November 2023, Alihodžić was named as Željezničar's caretaker manager. He led the side to a league victory against Sloga Meridian on 4 November.

=== Bosnia and Herzegovina U21 ===
On 6 March 2020, after Slobodan Starčević became the new head coach of the Bosnia and Herzegovina U21 national team, it was announced that Alihodžić, alongside Mario Ivanković, had been named as the new assistant coaches of Starčević.

== Honours ==
=== Player ===
Željezničar

- Bosnian First League: 1997–98
- Bosnian Premier League: 2000–01, 2001–02
- Bosnian Cup: 1999–2000, 2000–01, 2002–03
- Bosnian Supercup: 1998, 2000, 2001
