= Football in Sarajevo =

Football is the most popular sport, both in terms of participants and spectators, in Sarajevo. Sarajevo has several of Bosnia and Herzegovina's significant football clubs.

== Introduction ==
FK Željezničar and FK Sarajevo are Sarajevo's most successful clubs.

Koševo Stadium in Sarajevo is Bosnia's biggest stadium.

== History ==
The game reached Sarajevo in 1903. The city was under Austro-Hungarian rule when official competition began in 1908. At the outbreak of World War I, there were five clubs in Sarajevo; Hrvatski ŠK, Srpski ŠK, Muslimanski ŠK, Židovski ŠK and RŠD Hajduk. After World War I SAŠK and Slavija played in the Yugoslav First League, both becoming finalists and vice-champions (in 1923 and 1936). Most of the old clubs were dissolved in 1945 and soon many new like Torpedo Sarajevo were founded. Sarajevo became Yugoslav champions in 1967 and 1985, Željezničar in 1972. After the war and dissolution of Yugoslavia all Sarajevo clubs joined the Premier League of Bosnia and Herzegovina.

== Clubs ==
The table below is an incomplete list of active Sarajevo clubs.

Club	Founded
Bosna	1947
Famos Hrasnica	1953
Igman Ilidža	1923
Olimpik	1993
Pofalićki	1936
Sarajevo	1946
SAŠK Napredak	1910
Slavija	1908
Unis Vogošća	1948
FK Vrbanjuša	1967
Željezničar	1921

== Honours ==
- Bosnia and Herzegovina Football Champions (10)
  - Željezničar (7)
  - Sarajevo (3)
- Yugoslav Football Champions (3)
  - Sarajevo (2)
  - Željezničar (1)
- Bosnian Cup (13)
  - Željezničar (6)
  - Sarajevo (5)
  - Slavija (1)
  - Olimpic (1)
- Yugoslav Cup (0)
  - /
- Super Cup of Bosnia and Herzegovina (3)
  - Željezničar (2)
  - Sarajevo (1)

== Sarajevo derbies ==
First Sarajevo derby was between SAŠK and Slavija between 1910 and 1945. After the World War II a major Sarajevo derby between Željezničar and Sarajevo emerged.

== Stadia ==
- Koševo Stadium
- Grbavica Stadium
- Otoka Stadium
- SRC Slavija
- Hrasnica Stadium

== See also ==
- Football in Bosnia and Herzegovina
