= 2019–20 Bosnia and Herzegovina Football Cup =

Football tournament season

24th Bosnia and Herzegovina Football Cup

Tournament details
- Country: Bosnia and Herzegovina
- Teams: 32

Final positions
- Champions: Not awarded
- Runners-up: Not awarded

Tournament statistics
- Matches played: 28
- Goals scored: 92 (3.29 per match)
- Top goal scorer(s): Ivan Lendrić; Asim Zec (3 goals)

The 2019–20 Bosnia and Herzegovina Football Cup was the 24th edition of Bosnia and Herzegovina's annual football cup, and the nineteenth season of the unified competition.

Sarajevo were the defending champions, but they got eliminated by Široki Brijeg in the second round. The cup was abandoned on 1 June 2020 due to the COVID-19 pandemic in Bosnia and Herzegovina and was not finished.

== Participating teams ==
The following teams took part in the 2019–20 Bosnia and Herzegovina Football Cup.

2019–20 Premier League (12 teams)	2019–20 FBiH Cup (II) (11 teams)	2019–20 Republika Srpska (II) (7 teams)	Football Association of Republika Srpska (2 teams)
Željezničar Sarajevo; Čelik Zenica; Mladost Doboj Kakanj; Radnik Bijeljina; Sarajevo^{title holder}; Sloboda Tuzla; Široki Brijeg; Tuzla City; Zrinjski Mostar; Zvijezda 09; Velež Mostar; Borac Banja Luka	Bratstvo Gračanica; GOŠK Gabela; Orašje; Rudar Kakanj; Jedinstvo Bihać; Budućnost Banovići; Zvijezda Gradačac; Radnik; Travnik; TOŠK Tešanj; Olimpik	Krupa; Kozara Gradiška; Ljubuški; Tekstilac; Alfa Modriča; Rudar Prijedor; Slavija Istočno Sarajevo	Skugrić 1964 (group East); Ljubić Prnjavor (group West) (Note: FK Sloga Doboj withdrawn from the competition prior to First round draw.)

Roman number in brackets denote the level of respective league in Bosnian football league system

== Calendar ==
Round	Date(s)
1st Round	12 September 2019 (draw); 18 September 2019
2nd Round	22 September 2019 (draw); 2 October 2019
Quarter final	17 February 2020 (draw); 4 March 2020
Semi final	Not finished
Final	Not finished

== Bracket ==
Quarter-finals
Rudar Kakanj	0
GOŠK Gabela	3
Zrinjski Mostar	2
Tuzla City	1
Široki Brijeg (p)	1 (5)
Olimpik	1 (4)
Borac Banja Luka	0
Željezničar	2

Semi-finals

Final

== First round ==
Played on 18 September 2019

Home team	Away team	Result
Krupa (II)	Tuzla City (I)	0–0 (6–7 p)
Bratstvo Gračanica (II)	Velež Mostar (I)	2–3
Kozara Gradiška (II)	Sloboda Tuzla (I)	1–1 (3–5 p)
GOŠK Gabela (II)	Radnik Bijeljina (I)	1–1 (4–2 p)
Ljubuški (II)	Sarajevo (I)	2–4
Tekstilac (II)	Željezničar (I)	0–3
Orašje (II)	Borac Banja Luka (I)	0–4
Rudar Kakanj (II)	Čelik Zenica (I)	3–0
Alfa Modriča (II)	Zvijezda (I)	0–3
Jedinstvo Bihać (II)	Mladost Doboj Kakanj (I)	1–2
Budućnost Banovići (II)	Široki Brijeg (I)	1–1 (1-4 p)
Zvijezda Gradačac (II)	Zrinjski Mostar (I)	0–4
Rudar Prijedor (II)	Slavija Istočno Sarajevo (II)	4–1
Olimpik (II)	Radnik Hadžići (II)	2–1
Ljubić Prnjavor (III)	Travnik (II)	1–1 (4–3 p)
Skugrić 1964 (III)	TOŠK Tešanj (II)	0–10

== Second round ==
Played on 2 October 2019

Home team	Away team	Result
Zrinjski Mostar (I)	Sloboda Tuzla (I)	2–0
Olimpik (II)	TOŠK Tešanj (II)	3–0
Ljubić Prnjavor (III)	GOŠK Gabela (II)	0–2
Zvijezda (I)	Borac Banja Luka (I)	0–6
Tuzla City (I)	Velež Mostar (I)	1–0
Rudar Prijedor (II)	Rudar Kakanj (II)	0–0 (4–5 p)
Željezničar (I)	Mladost Doboj Kakanj (I)	6–1
Široki Brijeg (I)	Sarajevo (I)	3–2

== Quarter-finals ==
Played on 4 March 2020

Home team	Away team	Result
Rudar Kakanj (II)	GOŠK Gabela (II)	0–3
Zrinjski Mostar (I)	Tuzla City (I)	2–1
Široki Brijeg (I)	Olimpik (II)	1–1 (a.e.t.) (5–4 p)
Borac Banja Luka (I)	Željezničar (I)	0–2

== Semi-finals ==
Cancelled due to the COVID-19 pandemic in Bosnia and Herzegovina.

== Final ==
Cancelled due to the COVID-19 pandemic in Bosnia and Herzegovina.
