= 2004–05 First League of the Federation of Bosnia and Herzegovina =

First League of the Federation of Bosnia and Herzegovina
- Season: 2004-05
- Champions: Jedinstvo Bihać
- Promoted: Jedinstvo Bihać
- Relegated: Kiseljak; Radnik Hadžići; Drinovci
- Matches played: 240
- Goals scored: 599 (2.5 per match)

The 2004–05 First League of the Federation of Bosnia and Herzegovina season was the fifth since its establishment.

== League standings ==
Pos	Team	Pld	W	D	L	GF	GA	GD	Pts	Promotion or relegation
1	Jedinstvo Bihać (C, P)	30	21	3	6	62	29	+33	66	Promotion to Premijer Liga BiH
2	Velež	30	20	3	7	55	23	+32	63	
3	Rudar Kakanj	30	14	5	11	39	26	+13	47	
4	SAŠK Napredak	30	13	7	10	31	27	+4	46	
5	Radnički Lukavac	30	11	9	10	30	23	+7	42	
6	Mramor	30	13	3	14	38	45	−7	42	
7	Vitez	30	11	8	11	44	35	+9	41	
8	Podgrmeč	30	11	8	11	32	38	−6	41	
9	Ljubuški	30	12	4	14	41	44	−3	40	
10	GOŠK Gabela	30	12	3	15	33	40	−7	39	
11	Iskra	30	12	2	16	42	43	−1	38	
12	Brotnjo	30	11	5	14	36	49	−13	38	
13	Bosna Visoko	30	11	4	15	27	38	−11	37	
14	Kiseljak (R)	30	9	7	14	29	44	−15	34	Relegation to Second League FBiH
15	Radnik Hadžići (R)	30	9	6	15	26	41	−15	33	Relegation to Second League FBiH
16	Drinovci (R)	30	9	5	16	34	54	−20	32	Relegation to Second League FBiH

Rules for classification: 1) points; 2) goal difference; 3) number of goals scored.
(C) Champions; (P) Promoted; (R) Relegated
