= 2009–10 Bosnia and Herzegovina Football Cup =

Tournament details
- Country: Bosnia and Herzegovina
- Teams: 32

Final positions
- Champions: Borac (1st title)
- Runners-up: Željezničar

2009–10 Bosnia and Herzegovina Football Cup was the fifteenth season of Bosnia and Herzegovina's annual football cup, and a tenth season of the unified competition. The competition started on 8 September 2009 with the first round and concluded on 19 May 2010 with the final.

== First round ==
Thirty-two teams entered in the first round. The matches were played 8–23 September 2009.

Team 1	Score	Team 2
Modriča	7–1	Sloboda Novi Grad
Proleter Teslić	2–3	Leotar
Željezničar	1–0	Bosna Sarajevo
Borac Banja Luka	3–0 (f)	Posušje
Rudar Prijedor	4–1	Sutjeska Foča
Laktaši	0–2	Sloga Doboj
Velež	4–0	BSK Banja Luka
Travnik	2–1	Jedinstvo Bihać
Rudar Kakanj	0–2	Sloboda Tuzla
Kozara Gradiška	0–4	Široki Brijeg
Slavija	2–0	Turbina Jablanica
Sarajevo	4–0	Radnik Hadžići
Olimpik Sarajevo	4–2	Radnik Lipnica
Sloga Uskoplje	2–2 (6–5 p)	Zvijezda Gradačac
Zrinjski Mostar	4–0	Mladost Donji Svilaj
Čelik Zenica	4–2	Krajina Cazin

== Second round ==
The 16 winners from the prior round enter this round. The first legs were played on 29 and 30 September and the second legs were played on 21 and 22 October 2009.

Team 1	Agg.	Team 2	1st leg	2nd leg
Modriča	2–3	Sloga Doboj	1–2	1–1
Čelik Zenica	1–3	Slavija	1–0	0–3
Travnik	1–3	Sloboda Tuzla	1–1	0–2
Sloga Uskoplje	1–3	Rudar Prijedor	1–2	0–1
Velež	1–2	Željezničar	0–0	1–2
Leotar	4–0	Olimpik Sarajevo	3–0	1–0
Sarajevo	1–1 (a)	Zrinjski Mostar	1–1	0–0
Borac Banja Luka	3–1	Široki Brijeg	2–0	1–1

== Quarterfinals ==
The eight winners from the prior round enter this round. The first legs were played on 28 October and the second legs were played on 11 November 2009.

Team 1	Agg.	Team 2	1st leg	2nd leg
Sloga Doboj	0–3	Zrinjski Mostar	0–2	0–1
Slavija	2–1	Sloboda Tuzla	2–0	0–1
Leotar	0–4	Borac Banja Luka	0–3	0–1
Željezničar	3–0	Rudar Prijedor	3–0	0–0

== Semifinals ==
The four winners from the prior round enter this round. The first legs were played on 23 and 24 March and the second legs were played on 14 April 2010.

Team 1	Agg.	Team 2	1st leg	2nd leg
Slavija	2–3	Borac	2–2	0–1
Željezničar	4–2	Zrinjski	3–1	1–1

== Final ==
=== First leg ===
5 May 2010
20:15 CEST

Borac	1–1	Željezničar
Vukelja 11'	Report	Višća 83'

Gradski stadion, Banja Luka
Attendance: 11,000
Referee: Edin Jakupović (Bihać)

=== Second leg ===
19 May 2010
20:15 CEST

Željezničar	2–2	Borac
Višća 49'; Bešlija 55'	Report	Stevanović 6'; Kajkut 26'

Stadion Grbavica, Sarajevo
Attendance: 14,000
Referee: Dragan Skakić (Gradiška)

Željezničar 3–3 Borac on aggregate. Borac won on away goals.
