= 2003–04 First League of the Federation of Bosnia and Herzegovina =

First League of the Federation of Bosnia and Herzegovina
- Season: 2003-04
- Champions: Budućnost
- Promoted: Budućnost
- Relegated: Olimpic; Grude; Krivaja Zavidovići
- Matches played: 240
- Goals scored: 609 (2.54 per match)

The 2003–04 First League of the Federation of Bosnia and Herzegovina season was the fourth since its establishment.

== League standings ==
| Pos | Team | Pld | W | D | L | GF | GA | GD | Pts | Promotion or relegation |
|---|---|---|---|---|---|---|---|---|---|---|
| 1 | Budućnost (C, P) | 30 | 17 | 8 | 5 | 39 | 17 | +22 | 59 | Promotion to Premijer Liga BiH |
| 2 | Velež | 30 | 18 | 4 | 8 | 61 | 25 | +36 | 58 | |
| 3 | Rudar Kakanj | 30 | 14 | 4 | 12 | 55 | 35 | +20 | 46 | |
| 4 | Jedinstvo Bihać | 30 | 13 | 6 | 11 | 57 | 32 | +25 | 45 | |
| 5 | Iskra | 30 | 11 | 8 | 11 | 40 | 37 | +3 | 41 | |
| 6 | Podgrmeč | 30 | 13 | 2 | 15 | 37 | 46 | −9 | 41 | |
| 7 | Kiseljak | 30 | 11 | 7 | 12 | 39 | 41 | −2 | 40 | |
| 8 | GOŠK Gabela | 30 | 11 | 7 | 12 | 28 | 34 | −6 | 40 | |
| 9 | Ljubuški | 30 | 11 | 6 | 13 | 36 | 35 | +1 | 39 | |
| 10 | SAŠK Napredak | 30 | 11 | 6 | 13 | 28 | 34 | −6 | 39 | |
| 11 | Bosna Visoko | 30 | 11 | 6 | 13 | 37 | 47 | −10 | 39 | |
| 12 | Drinovci | 30 | 11 | 6 | 13 | 27 | 39 | −12 | 39 | |
| 13 | Radnički Lukavac | 30 | 11 | 5 | 14 | 33 | 49 | −16 | 38 | |
| 14 | Olimpic (R) | 30 | 10 | 8 | 12 | 36 | 40 | −4 | 38 | Relegation to Second League FBiH |
| 15 | Grude (R) | 30 | 12 | 2 | 16 | 24 | 58 | −34 | 38 | Relegation to Second League FBiH |
| 16 | Krivaja (R) | 30 | 10 | 5 | 15 | 32 | 40 | −8 | 35 | Relegation to Second League FBiH |

Source: Futbol24.com
Rules for classification: 1) points; 2) goal difference; 3) number of goals scored.
(C) Champions; (P) Promoted; (R) Relegated
