= 2002–03 First League of the Federation of Bosnia and Herzegovina =

The 2002–03 First League of the Federation of Bosnia and Herzegovina season was the third since its establishment.

== Clubs and stadiums ==
Location of clubs in FBiH First League 2002-03

Club	City	Stadium	2001–02 season
Boljava	Drinovci		Second League
Čapljina	Čapljina		First League
Elektrobosna	Jajce		Second League
Famos	Hrasnica		Second League
Fruti	Čelić		First League
Grude	Grude		Premier League
Iskra	Bugojno		Premier League
Kiseljak	Kiseljak		First League
Ljubuški	Ljubuški		First League
Olimpik	Sarajevo		Premier League
Radnički	Lukavac		First League
Rudar	Kakanj		First League
SAŠK Napredak	Sarajevo		First League
Stolac	Stolac		First League
Tomislav	Tomislavgrad		First League
TOŠK	Tešanj		Second League
Travnik	Travnik		First League
Troglav	Livno		Premier League
Vitez	Vitez		First League

== League standings ==
Pos	Team	Pld	W	D	L	GF	GA	GD	Pts	Promotion or relegation
1	Travnik (C, P)	36	23	7	6	78	28	+50	76	Promotion to Premijer Liga BiH
2	Olimpic	36	20	2	14	85	51	+34	62	
3	Iskra	36	19	5	12	68	36	+32	62	
4	Kiseljak	36	18	6	12	52	42	+10	60	
5	Rudar Kakanj	36	18	5	13	63	42	+21	59	
6	Radnički Lukavac	36	18	3	15	53	51	+2	57	
7	Ljubuški	36	16	6	14	49	45	+4	54	
8	Boljava	36	16	6	14	48	59	−11	54	
9	SAŠK Napredak	36	16	5	15	54	46	+8	53	
10	Grude	36	16	5	15	48	52	−4	53	
11	Vitez (R)	36	16	4	16	42	37	+5	52	Relegation to Second League FBiH
12	TOŠK (R)	36	15	6	15	62	55	+7	51	Relegation to Second League FBiH
13	Fruti (R)	36	15	6	15	56	62	−6	51	Relegation to Second League FBiH
14	Stolac (R)	36	14	6	16	47	65	−18	48	Relegation to Second League FBiH
15	Troglav (R)	36	12	7	17	45	53	−8	43	Relegation to Second League FBiH
16	Čapljina (R)	36	12	7	17	47	60	−13	43	Relegation to Second League FBiH
17	Tomislav (R)	36	12	6	18	34	58	−24	42	Relegation to Second League FBiH
18	Famos Hrasnica (R)	36	11	6	19	45	62	−17	39	Relegation to Second League FBiH
19	Elektrobosna (Note: Elektrobosna deducted 2 points for not show up in two away games, their opponents were awarded win 3-0.) (R)	36	6	1	29	29	101	−72	17	Relegation to Second League FBiH

Source: RSSSF.org
Rules for classification: 1) points; 2) goal difference; 3) number of goals scored.
(C) Champions; (P) Promoted; (R) Relegated
