= 1998–99 First League of Bosnia and Herzegovina =

Association football competition

This article includes the statistics of the First League of Bosnia and Herzegovina in the 1998–99 season. It was contested only by the clubs playing under the auspices of NFSBiH and HZHB, without the clubs who competed under the auspices of Republika Srpska entity association playing in the 1998–99 First League of the Republika Srpska.

== Overview ==
It was contested by 16 teams (competition organized by NFSBiH) and 14 teams (competition organized by HZHB).

Originally playoff between clubs topping the competition tables organized by NFSBiH and HZHB was scheduled, but due to stadium issue, the playoff was canceled thus neither club were able to qualify for the respective European competition. The title was, however, awarded to FK Sarajevo, while Jedinstvo Bihać qualified for the Intertoto Cup first round.

== First League of Bosnia and Herzegovina ==
=== League standings ===
Pos	Team	Pld	W	D	L	GF	GA	GD	Pts	Qualification or relegation
1	Sarajevo (C)	30	22	2	6	55	21	+34	68	Champions
2	Bosna	30	18	2	10	50	21	+29	56	
3	Rudar Kakanj	30	15	7	8	39	26	+13	52	
4	Velež	30	15	7	8	46	37	+9	52	
5	Sloboda Tuzla	30	15	6	9	45	32	+13	51	
6	Jedinstvo Bihać	30	13	6	11	37	39	−2	45	Qualification to Intertoto Cup first round
7	Željezničar	30	12	8	10	43	30	+13	44	
8	Lukavac	30	13	4	13	36	32	+4	43	
9	Čelik	30	13	3	14	47	47	0	42	
10	Budućnost	30	12	6	12	23	27	−4	42	
11	Drina Zvornik-Živinice	30	8	10	12	28	34	−6	34	
12	Gradina Srebrenik	30	7	12	11	24	32	−8	33	
13	Iskra	30	8	8	14	29	39	−10	32	
14	Zenica	30	7	8	15	27	54	−27	29	
15	Zmaj od Bosne (R)	30	7	5	18	34	57	−23	26	Relegation to Second League of Bosnia and Herzegovina
16	Vrbanjuša (R)	30	5	6	19	22	57	−35	21	Relegation to Second League of Bosnia and Herzegovina

Source: RSSSF.org
(C) Champions; (R) Relegated

=== Results ===
Home \ Away	BOS	BUD	ČEL	DRZ	GRA	ISK	JED	LUK	RKA	SAR	SLO	VEL	VRB	ZEN	ZMA	ŽEL
Bosna		3–0	4–0	1–0	3–1	3–0	2–0	2–0	1–0	1–0	4–1	6–1	4–0	3–1	3–0	1–0
Budućnost	2–0		2–0	0–1	0–0	1–0	2–0	1–0	0–0	1–0	0–1	0–0	2–0	2–0	2–1	1–2
Čelik	2–1	1–0		3–1	3–1	4–0	2–0	1–0	2–0	1–3	3–2	0–2	4–1	1–1	6–1	1–1
Drina Zvornik-Živinice	1–2	0–0	1–0		1–1	1–2	1–1	2–1	0–0	1–3	0–0	2–0	2–0	2–2	1–0	0–0
Gradina Srebrenik	1–0	0–0	0–2	0–0		2–0	1–0	1–1	0–0	0–0	0–2	0–0	2–0	1–1	2–0	2–1
Iskra	2–0	0–0	2–0	0–1	2–2		1–0	2–0	0–0	0–0	0–0	1–4	2–0	0–0	7–0	1–0
Jedinstvo Bihać	1–0	1–0	4–2	3–1	1–0	1–0		4–1	3–1	2–1	1–0	1–1	2–0	2–1	3–0	1–1
Lukavac	1–0	1–0	3–0	0–1	1–0	1–0	1–1		2–0	2–0	0–2	1–0	4–0	3–0	4–1	1–0
Rudar Kakanj	1–0	4–0	2–0	3–2	2–1	1–0	3–0	2–0		2–0	0–2	2–2	2–1	5–1	3–1	1–0
Sarajevo	1–0	4–1	2–1	3–1	1–0	5–0	3–0	4–0	2–1		2–0	2–0	3–2	2–1	1–0	3–1
Sloboda Tuzla	0–1	3–1	2–0	1–0	0–0	3–1	4–0	3–2	1–2	0–2		2–0	3–0	0–1	5–5	1–0
Velež	1–0	3–0	5–3	2–1	2–2	3–2	2–2	3–2	3–0	1–3	3–1		3–0	1–0	1–0	0–0
Vrbanjuša	1–4	0–1	1–2	0–0	1–0	2–1	1–1	0–3	0–0	0–1	0–0	2–1		1–0	3–2	2–2
Zenica	1–1	0–3	1–1	3–2	0–2	1–1	2–1	1–0	1–0	1–0	1–1	0–1	3–2		1–3	0–3
Zmaj od Bosne	0–0	0–1	2–1	2–1	3–0	2–2	2–0	0–0	0–0	0–1	2–3	0–1	2–1	5–0		0–1
Željezničar	2–0	2–0	2–1	1–1	5–2	2–0	3–1	1–1	1–2	1–2	1–2	2–0	1–1	5–2	2–0	

Source: RSSSF.org
Legend: Blue = home team win; Yellow = draw; Red = away team win.

== First League of Herzeg-Bosnia ==
=== League standings ===
Pos	Team	Pld	W	D	L	GF	GA	GD	Pts	Qualification or relegation
1	Posušje (C)	26	17	7	2	53	14	+39	58	Champions
2	Široki Brijeg	26	16	5	5	65	25	+40	53	
3	Zrinjski Mostar	26	16	4	6	44	21	+23	52	
4	Brotnjo Čitluk	26	14	5	7	53	26	+27	47	
5	Orašje	26	13	5	8	39	25	+14	44	
6	Troglav Livno	26	12	1	13	36	31	+5	37	
7	Kiseljak	26	9	5	12	30	35	−5	32	
8	Vitez	26	10	1	15	24	41	−17	31	
9	Stolac	26	9	4	13	20	42	−22	31	
10	Ljubuški	26	8	6	12	26	37	−11	30	
11	GOŠK Gabela	26	9	3	14	30	54	−24	30	
12	Redarstvenik Mostar	26	8	5	13	27	36	−9	29	
13	Odžak 102 (R)	26	8	5	13	38	53	−15	29	Relegation to Second League of Herzeg-Bosnia
14	Sloga Uskoplje (R)	26	2	6	18	16	62	−46	12	Relegation to Second League of Herzeg-Bosnia

(C) Champions; (R) Relegated

== See also ==
- 1998–99 First League of the Republika Srpska
