= 2001–02 First League of the Federation of Bosnia and Herzegovina =

Second season of the First League of the Federation of Bosnia and Herzegovina

The 2001–02 First League of the Federation of Bosnia and Herzegovina season was the second since its establishment.

== League standings ==
Pos	Team	Pld	W	D	L	GF	GA	GD	Pts	Promotion or relegation
1	Žepče (C, P)	28	18	4	6	53	31	+22	58	Promotion to Premijer Liga BiH
2	Budućnost (P)	28	17	3	8	64	25	+39	54	Promotion to Premijer Liga BiH
3	Radnički Lukavac	28	17	2	9	45	28	+17	53	
4	Rudar Kakanj	28	15	4	9	42	23	+19	49	
5	Kiseljak	28	13	4	11	42	33	+9	43	
6	Fruti	28	13	3	12	49	38	+11	42	
7	SAŠK Napredak	28	13	2	13	49	40	+9	41	
8	Vitez	28	12	4	12	42	40	+2	40	
9	Stolac	28	12	3	13	29	30	−1	39	
10	Tomislav	28	12	2	14	31	44	−13	38	
11	Krajina	28	12	2	14	35	51	−16	38	
12	Travnik	28	12	1	15	44	43	+1	37	
13	Čapljina	28	11	1	16	41	61	−20	34	
14	Sloga Ljubuški	28	10	3	15	28	36	−8	33	
15	Radnički 17K Lipnica (R)	28	3	2	23	24	95	−71	11	Relegation to Second League FBiH
16	Đerzelez (R)	0	0	0	0	0	0	0	0	Relegation to Second League FBiH

Source: RSSSF.org
Rules for classification: 1) points; 2) goal difference; 3) number of goals scored.
(C) Champions; (P) Promoted; (R) Relegated
