= Sarajevo derby =

Football derby in Bosnia and Herzegovina

- Sarajevo fans at Grbavica Stadium, 9 May 2009
- Other names: Eternal derby
- Location: Sarajevo, Bosnia and Herzegovina
- Teams: Željezničar; Sarajevo
- First meeting: 12 August 1954
- Latest meeting: 24 October 2026

Statistics
- Total meetings: Total: 161; Official: 141 (League competition)
- All-time series: Total: Željezničar (49); Sarajevo (49); Drawn (63)

The Sarajevo derby (Bosnian: Sarajevski derbi, Serbian: Сарајевски дерби), also known as the Eternal derby (Bosnian: Vječiti derbi), is the name given to any football match between rival clubs Željezničar and FK Sarajevo, the two primary clubs in Sarajevo, Bosnia and Herzegovina. It is the most viewed annual sporting event in Bosnia and Herzegovina.

Željezničar and Sarajevo are tied in head-to-head results in competitive matches with 49 wins for both, including 63 draws. Along with Zrinjski Mostar and Široki Brijeg, they are the only clubs in the Bosnian Premier League to have never been relegated.

This fixture is not only Bosnia and Herzegovina's premier football rivalry, but it has also been recognized internationally, being featured among FourFourTwo’s 50 Biggest Derbies in the World.

== History ==
The history of the Sarajevo derby dates back to 1954, but the rivalry began eight years earlier. At the end of World War II, the three major clubs in Sarajevo, Đerzelez, SAŠK and Slavija, were disbanded by the new authorities which formed FK Sarajevo in 1946. Since the idea was for this new club to represent the city on a national level, SD Torpedo, as FK Sarajevo was initially called, needed the best players from the city. Numerous notable players were brought to the club, and they received good salaries for that time. On the other side, FK Željezničar Sarajevo is a club which was formed by a group of railway workers much earlier, in 1921. However, until then, during the pre-war period, they were in the shadow of Đerzelez, SAŠK and Slavija and had never managed to qualify to the Yugoslav Championship. Željezničar won the second-tier Bosnian championship title in 1946, as part of the Yugoslav football league system, and that achievement marked the beginning of their climb. After the war, these two clubs became the most prominent and successful clubs in Sarajevo, and since then, the rivalry between the two has been intense.

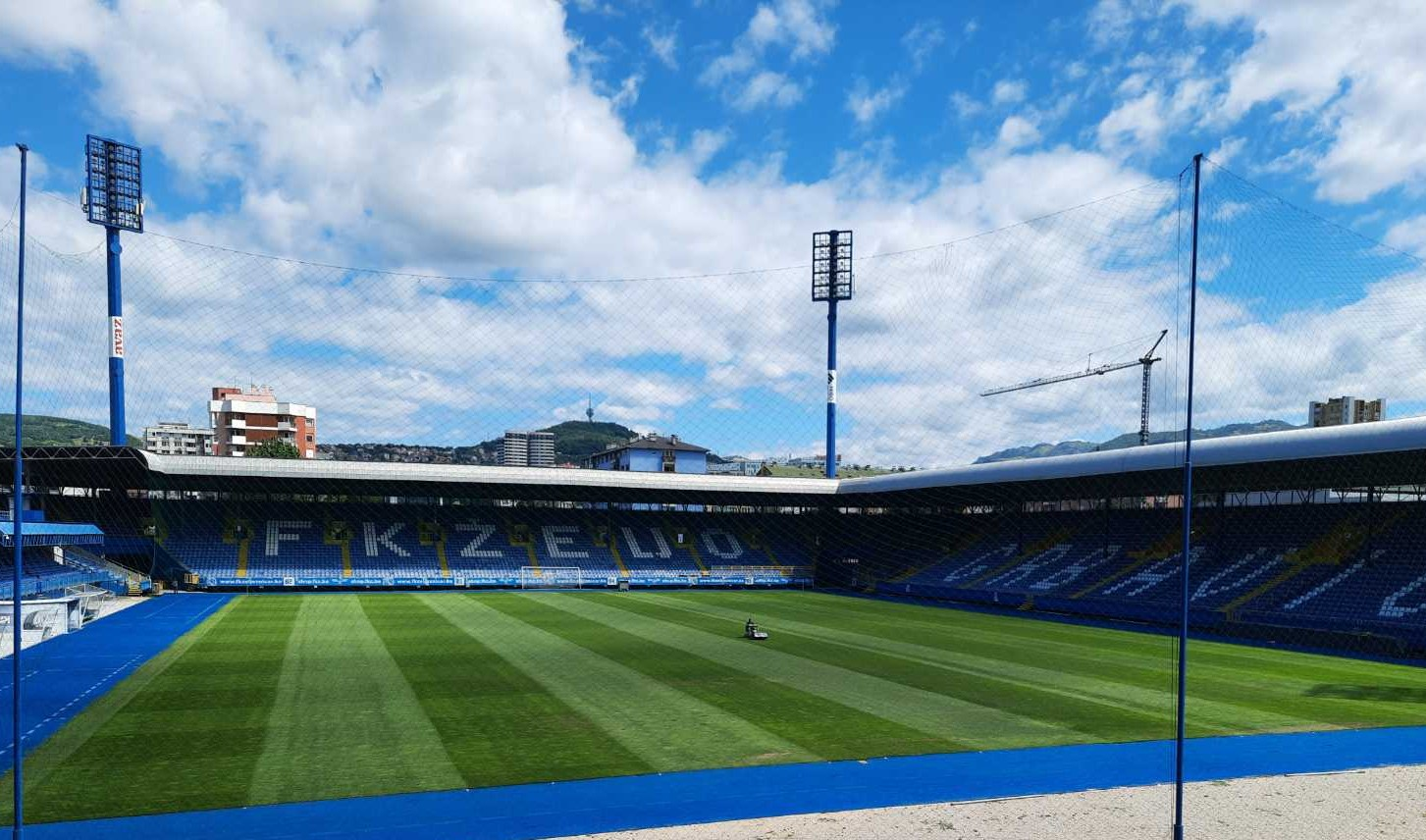
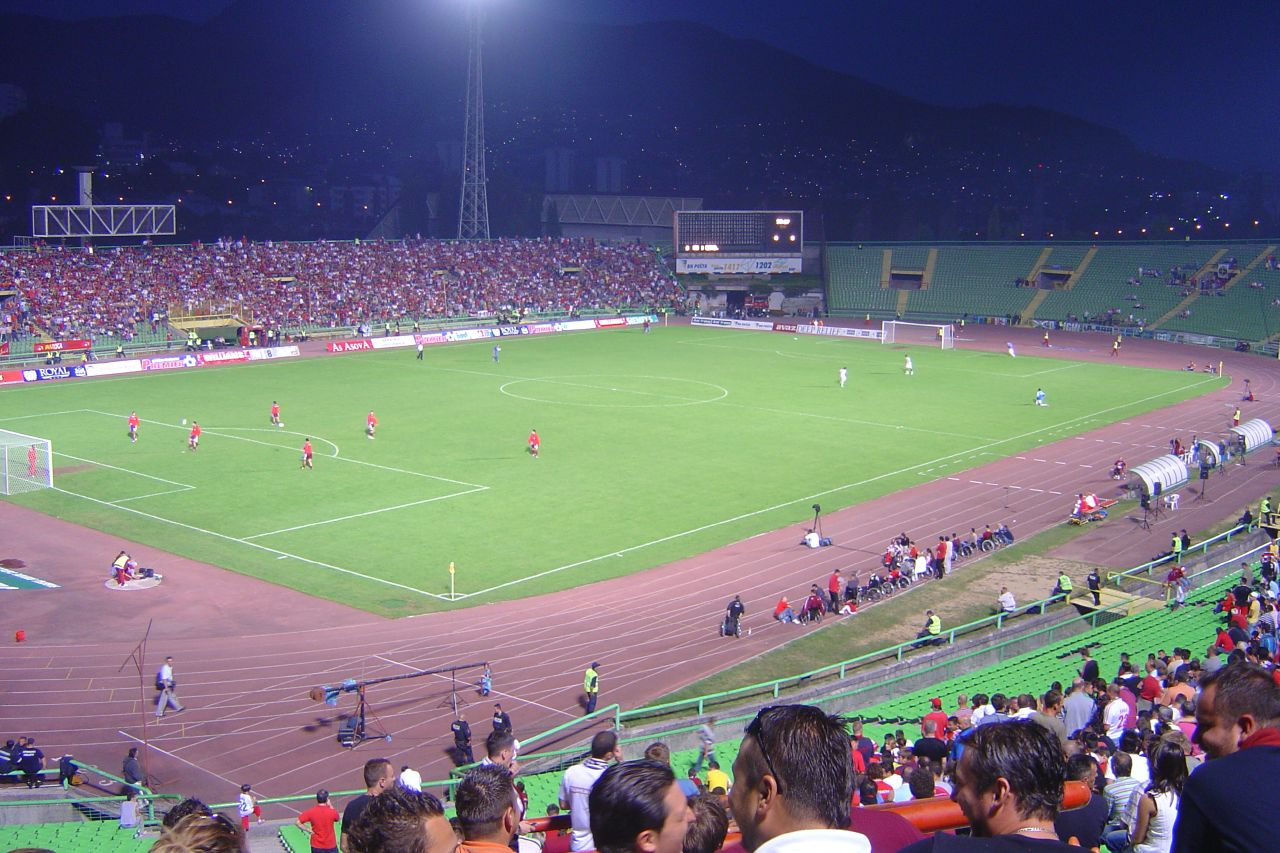
Grbavica Stadium (left), the home of Željezničar, and Koševo Stadium (right), the home of Sarajevo

FK Sarajevo supporters were considered to be upper-class individuals, mainly from Bosniak dominated old and central parts of town. On the other side, supporters of FK Željezničar were usually working-class with a liberal image. Those differences were later partly erased. FK Željezničar still has the image of a liberal club and they are also popular among other supporters in the region, while FK Sarajevo's support outside Sarajevo comes mostly from the Bosniak dominated areas in the region and diaspora.

Since they played in different levels, the first matches between FK Željezničar and FK Sarajevo were friendlies. The first official league match was held in 1954; FK Sarajevo won 6–1. That is still the biggest victory by any team in these matches.

As of 24 October 2026, 141 league matches have been played. Both have won 41 times, while 59 matches have ended in a draw. Goal difference is 161:156 in Sarajevo's favour. In all competitions, Željezničar and Sarajevo have played 161 times, both have won 49 times, and 63 games have ended in a draw.

== Honours ==
| FK Sarajevo | Competition | FK Željezničar |
Domestic
| 5 | Bosnian Premier League | 6 |
| 8 | Bosnian Cup | 6 |
| 1 | Bosnian Supercup | 3 |
| 14 | Aggregate | 15 |
Yugoslavia Era (1946–1992)
| 2 | Yugoslav First League | 1 |
| 2 | Aggregate | 1 |
| 16 | Total Aggregate | 16 |

== All competitions ==
As of match played 24 October 2026

The Sarajevo derby is currently played four times a year in the Premier League, but they may also play against one another in other competitions. There are also friendly matches and games played in various tournaments. Although these games are not included in official statistics.

| | Matches | Wins | | Draws | Goals | |
| | Matches | Sarajevo | Željezničar | Draws | Sarajevo | Željezničar |
|---|---|---|---|---|---|---|
| Bosnian Premier League | 78 | 22 | 20 | 36 | 78 | 70 |
| Bosnian Cup | 14 | 6 | 4 | 4 | 21 | 19 |
| Bosnian Supercup | 1 | 0 | 1 | 0 | 0 | 4 |
| 1992–Present | 93 | 28 | 25 | 40 | 99 | 93 |
| Yugoslav First League | 63 | 19 | 21 | 23 | 83 | 86 |
| Yugoslav Cup | 5 | 2 | 3 | 0 | 10 | 13 |
| 1946–1992 | 68 | 21 | 24 | 23 | 93 | 99 |
| Total | 161 | 49 | 49 | 63 | 192 | 192 |

== Bosnian Premier League head-to-head ranking ==
| P. | 95 | 96 | 97 | 98 | 99 | 00 | 01 | 02 | 03 | 04 | 05 | 06 | 07 | 08 | 09 | 10 | 11 | 12 | 13 | 14 | 15 | 16 | 17 | 18 | 19 | 20 | 21 | 22 | 23 | 24 | 25 | 26 |
|---|---|---|---|---|---|---|---|---|---|---|---|---|---|---|---|---|---|---|---|---|---|---|---|---|---|---|---|---|---|---|---|---|
| 1 | | | | 1 | 1 | | 1 | 1 | | | | | 1 | | | 1 | | 1 | 1 | | 1 | | | | 1 | 1 | | | | | | |
| 2 | 2 | | 2 | 2 | | | | | 2 | 2 | 2 | 2 | | | | | 2 | | 2 | | 2 | | 2 | 2 | | 2 | 2 | | | | | |
| 3 | | | | | | | 3 | | 3 | 3 | | | | | | | 3 | | | 3 | | | 3 | 3 | | | | | 3 | | 3 | 3 |
| 4 | 4 | | | | | | | 4 | | | 4 | | | | 4 | | | 4 | | 4 | | 4 | | | 4 | | | 4 | 4 | 4 | 4 | |
| 5 | | | | | | | | | | | | | 5 | 5 | | 5 | | | | | | 5 | | | | | | | | | | |
| 6 | | | | | | | | | | | | 6 | | | | | | | | | | | | | | | | 6 | | 6 | | 6 |
| 7 | | 7 | 7 | | 7 | | | | | | | | | 7 | | | | | | | | | | | | | 7 | | | | | |
| 8 | | | | | | | | | | | | | | | | | | | | | | | | | | | | | | | | |
| 9 | | 9 | | | | | | | | | | | | | 9 | | | | | | | | | | | | | | | | | |
| 10 | | | | | | | | | | | | | | | | | | | | | | | | | | | | | | | | |
| 11 | | | | | | | | | | | | | | | | | | | | | | | | | | | | | | | | |
| 12 | | | | | | | | | | | | | | | | | | | | | | | | | | | | | | | | |
| 13 | | | | | | | | | | | | | | | | | | | | | | | | | | | | | | | | |
| 14 | | | | | | | | | | | | | | | | | | | | | | | | | | | | | | | | |
| 15 | | | | | | | | | | | | | | | | | | | | | | | | | | | | | | | | |
| 16 | | | | | | | | | | | | | | | | | | | | | | | | | | | | | | | | |
| 17 | | | | | | | | | | | | | | | | | | | | | | | | | | | | | | | | |
| 18 | | | | | | | | | | | | | | | | | | | | | | | | | | | | | | | | |
| 19 | | | | | | | | | | | | | | | | | | | | | | | | | | | | | | | | |
| 20 | | | | | | | | | | | | | | | | | | | | | | | | | | | | | | | | |
| 21 | | | | | | | | | | | | | | | | | | | | | | | | | | | | | | | | |
| 22 | | | | | | | | | | | | | | | | | | | | | | | | | | | | | | | | |

• Total: FK Sarajevo 19 times higher, FK Željezničar 12 times higher.

== Records ==
- Most appearances: Slobodan Janjuš – 21 (16 for Željezničar, 5 for Sarajevo)
- Best goalscorers: Asim Ferhatović (Sarajevo), Dželaludin Muharemović (Željezničar) – 6 goals
- Record win: Željezničar – Torpedo 9:1 (29 December 1946, first derby match recorded)
- Biggest attendance: 55,000 (10 March 1982, Koševo Stadium)
- Double victory (two wins in a season): Željezničar (1968–69, 1989–90, 2000–01, 2015–16, 2017–18, 2019–20); Sarajevo (1955–56, 1966–67, 1998–99, 2006–07, 2018–19);
- Longest unbeaten run: 11 games (Sarajevo: 6 June 1963 – 1 December 1968; Željezničar: 15 October 2000 – 5 April 2006)
- Longest unbeaten run (home): 17 games (Željezničar: 3 April 1977 – 26 October 1997)
- Longest unbeaten run (away): 6 games (Sarajevo: 2 June 1963 – 29 June 1969; Željezničar: 28 April 2001 – 21 April 2007)
- Longest winning run: 3 games (Željezničar: 14 May 1988 – 10 December 1989; Sarajevo: 5 April 2006 – 21 April 2007)
- Longest winning run (home): 3 games (Željezničar two times: 23 August 1981 – 18 March 1984 & 10 October 1999 – 11 May 2002)
- Longest winning run (away): Two games by both teams on several occasions;
- Radmilo Mihajlović is the only player to score a hat-trick. (7 September 1986, Željezničar won 4–1)

Note that only league matches are included in statistics. Cup, other tournaments and friendly matches are not included.

== Fans ==
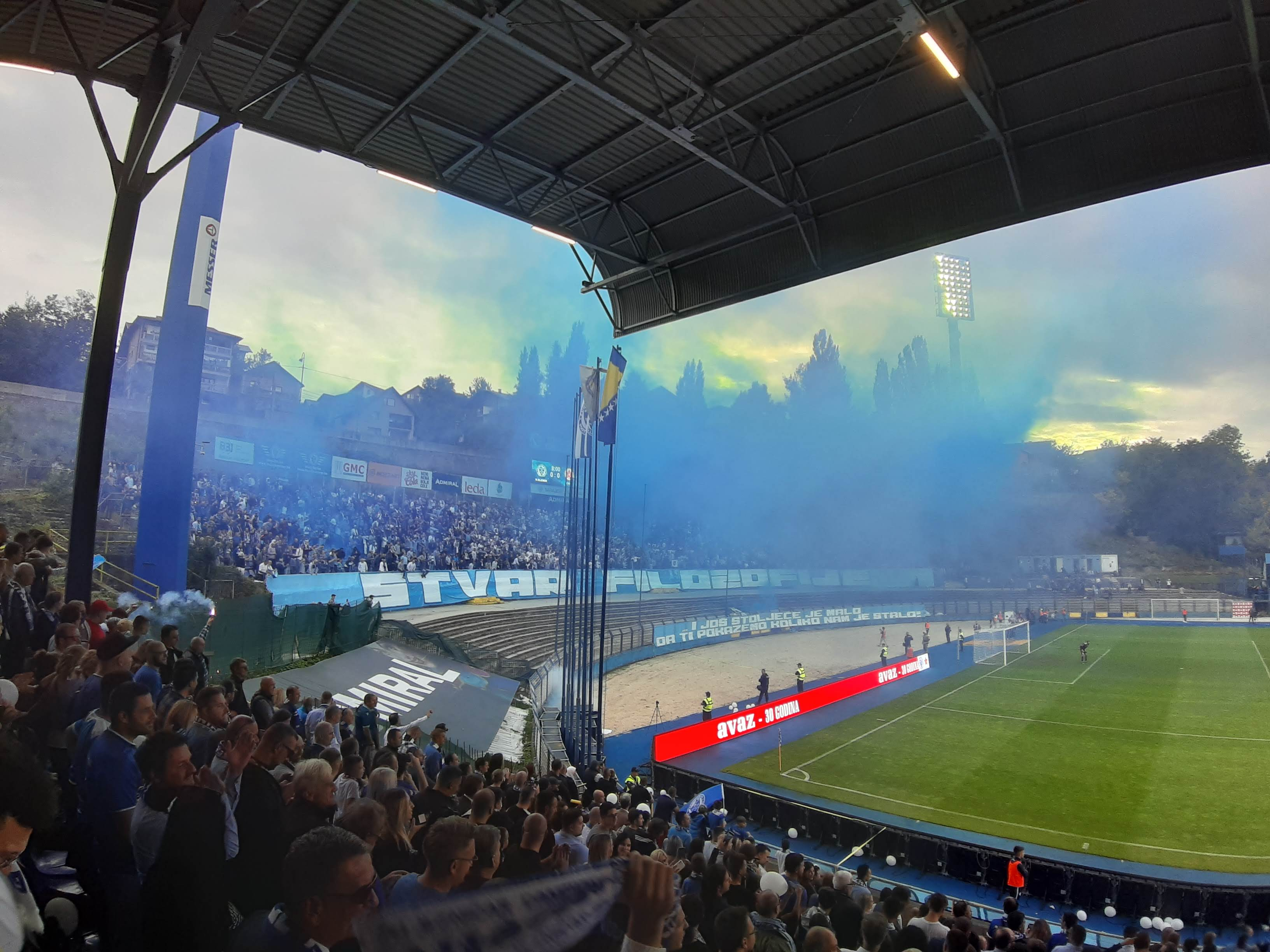
Željezničar supporters at Grbavica Stadium

| Club | Ultras | Stand |
|---|---|---|
| FK Željezničar | The Maniacs | South |
| FK Sarajevo | Horde Zla | North |

Sarajevo derby fans are known for their cheering and choreography. Both sides of fans prepare between the matches and make large flags and special messages that are appropriate for that particular occasion that are usually directed towards the opposing side.

FK Željezničar's fans who wear blue are called Manijaci because their love for the club is 'on the edge of insanity'. They are located on the South side of Grbavica Stadium (the Holy South as they call it). The older fans ones are known as the Košpicari (which can metaphorically be translated as "seed eaters", although the name itself has different meaning - namely that of "seed sellers").

FK Sarajevo's most passionate fans (crimson) are called the Horde Zla (Evil hordes) after the popular Zagor comic book. At their home games at the Asim Ferhatović - Hase Stadium, they are located on the North stands, while the older fans are known as the Pitari (similar to the Košpicari etymology except referring to pie and not seeds) and they are mainly on the East side.

== Results 1946–1992 ==
Derby FK Sarajevo vs FK Željezničar in Socialist Federal Republic of Yugoslavia 1946–1992
| Total games | 68 | 68 | Total games |
| Won | 21 | 21 | Lost |
| Draw | 23 | 23 | Draw |
| Lost | 24 | 24 | Won |
| Goals For | 93 | 93 | Goals Against |
| Goals Against | 98 | 98 | Goals For |

| # | Date | Stadium | Home | Score | Away | Report | Watch on YouTube |
|---|---|---|---|---|---|---|---|
| 1 | 29 December 1946 | Stadion 6. april | Željezničar | 9–1 | Torpedo | Report | |
| 2 | 30 August 1978 | Grbavica | Željezničar | 4–0 | Sarajevo | | |
| 3 | 10 March 1982 | Koševo | Sarajevo | 1–2 | Željezničar | | 42,000 attn. |

== League Results 1992–present ==
| Stadium | Matches | Wins FK Sarajevo | Draws | Wins FK Željezničar | Goals FK Sarajevo | Goals FK Željezničar |
|---|---|---|---|---|---|---|
| Koševo | 39 | 15 | 18 | 6 | 49 | 27 |
| Grbavica | 37 | 7 | 16 | 14 | 28 | 42 |
| Bilino Polje | 1 | 0 | 1 | 0 | 1 | 1 |
| Bosnian FA Training Centre | 1 | 0 | 1 | 0 | 0 | 0 |
| Total matches | 78 | 22 | 36 | 20 | 78 | 70 |

| # | Date | Stadium | Home | Score | Away | Report | Watch on YouTube |
|---|---|---|---|---|---|---|---|
| 1 | 14 September 1994 | Bilino Polje, Zenica | FK Željezničar | 1–1 | FK Sarajevo | Report | |
| 2 | 15 November 1995 | Koševo | FK Sarajevo | 5–0 | FK Željezničar | Report | Watch on youtube |
| 3 | 2 May 1996 | Grbavica | FK Željezničar | 1–1 | FK Sarajevo | Report | Watch on youtube |
| 4 | 22 September 1996 | Grbavica | FK Željezničar | 1–1 | FK Sarajevo | Report | |
| 5 | 16 April 1997 | Koševo | FK Sarajevo | 1–0 | FK Željezničar | Report | |
| 6 | 26 October 1997 | Grbavica | FK Željezničar | 1–2 | FK Sarajevo | Report | Watch on youtube |
| 7 | 3 May 1998 | Koševo | FK Sarajevo | 1–1 | FK Željezničar | Report | Watch on youtube |
| 8 | 5 June 1998 | Koševo | FK Sarajevo | 0–1 | FK Željezničar | Report | Watch on youtube |
| 9 | 8 August 1998 | Koševo | FK Sarajevo | 3–1 | FK Željezničar | Report | Watch on youtube |
| 10 | 14 March 1999 | Grbavica | FK Željezničar | 1–2 | FK Sarajevo | Report | Watch on youtube |
| 11 | 10 October 1999 | Grbavica | FK Željezničar | 2–0 | FK Sarajevo | Report | |
| 12 | 6 May 2000 | Koševo | FK Sarajevo | 4–1 | FK Željezničar | Report | |
| 13 | 23 September 2000 | Grbavica | FK Željezničar | 1–0 | FK Sarajevo | Report | |
| 14 | 28 April 2001 | Koševo | FK Sarajevo | 0–3 | FK Željezničar | Report | Watch on youtube |
| 15 | 11 November 2001 | Koševo | FK Sarajevo | 2–2 | FK Željezničar | Report | |
| 16 | 4 May 2002 | Grbavica | FK Željezničar | 1–0 | FK Sarajevo | Report | |
| 17 | 22 September 2002 | Grbavica | FK Željezničar | 1–1 | FK Sarajevo | Report | Watch on youtube |
| 18 | 13 April 2003 | Koševo | FK Sarajevo | 1–1 | FK Željezničar | Report | |
| 19 | 5 October 2003 | Koševo | FK Sarajevo | 1–1 | FK Željezničar | Report | Pogedaj |
| 20 | 30 April 2004 | Grbavica | FK Željezničar | 2–1 | FK Sarajevo | Report | |
| 21 | 30 October 2004 | Koševo | FK Sarajevo | 0–1 | FK Željezničar | Report | |
| 22 | 30 April 2005 | Grbavica | FK Željezničar | 1–1 | FK Sarajevo | Report | |
| 23 | 15 October 2005 | Koševo | FK Sarajevo | 0–0 | FK Željezničar | Report | |
| 24 | 5 April 2006 | Grbavica | FK Željezničar | 0–1 | FK Sarajevo | Report | |
| 25 | 30 September 2006 | Grbavica | FK Željezničar | 0–1 | FK Sarajevo | Report | |
| 26 | 21 April 2007 | Koševo | FK Sarajevo | 2–1 | FK Željezničar | Report | |
| 27 | 6 October 2007 | Grbavica | FK Željezničar | 0–0 | FK Sarajevo | Report | |
| 28 | 19 April 2008 | Koševo | FK Sarajevo | 0–0 | FK Željezničar | Report | |
| 29 | 8 November 2008 | Koševo | FK Sarajevo | 0–0 | FK Željezničar | Report | |
| 30 | 9 May 2009 | Grbavica | FK Željezničar | 2–0 | FK Sarajevo | Report | |
| 31 | 7 November 2009 | Grbavica | FK Željezničar | 1–2 | FK Sarajevo | Report | |
| 32 | 15 May 2010 | Koševo | FK Sarajevo | 0–0 | FK Željezničar | Report | |
| 33 | 24 October 2010 | Grbavica | FK Željezničar | 0–0 | FK Sarajevo | Report | |
| 34 | 7 May 2011 | Koševo | FK Sarajevo | 0–0 | FK Željezničar | Report | |
| 35 | 5 November 2011 | Grbavica | FK Željezničar | 1–0 | FK Sarajevo | Report | Watch on youtube |
| 36 | 12 May 2012 | Koševo | FK Sarajevo | 2–2 | FK Željezničar | Report | Watch on youtube |
| 37 | 3 November 2012 | Koševo | FK Sarajevo | 1–0 | FK Željezničar | Report | Watch on youtube |
| 38 | 8 May 2013 | Grbavica | FK Željezničar | 0–0 | FK Sarajevo | Report | Watch on YouTube |
| 39 | 30 October 2013 | Koševo | FK Sarajevo | 0–0 | FK Željezničar | Report | Watch on YouTube |
| 40 | 4 May 2014 | Grbavica | FK Željezničar | 1–1 | FK Sarajevo | | Bordo vremeplov |
| 41 | 2 November 2014 | Grbavica | FK Željezničar | 1–2 | FK Sarajevo | Report | 1921.tv |
| 42 | 16 May 2015 | Koševo | FK Sarajevo | 0–0 | FK Željezničar | Report | FK Sarajevo, 1921.tv |
| 43 | 4 October 2015 | Grbavica | FK Željezničar | 1–0 | FK Sarajevo | Report | FK Sarajevo, 1921.tv |
| 44 | 24 April 2016 | Koševo | FK Sarajevo | 0–1 | FK Željezničar | Report | FK Sarajevo, 1921.tv |
| 45 | 23 July 2016 | Grbavica | FK Željezničar | 1–1 | FK Sarajevo | Report | FK Sarajevo, 1921.tv |
| 46 | 16 October 2016 | Koševo | FK Sarajevo | 0–0 | FK Željezničar | Report | FK Sarajevo, 1921.tv |
| 47 | 15 April 2017 | Grbavica | FK Željezničar | 0–0 | FK Sarajevo | Report | FK Sarajevo, 1921.tv |
| 48 | 20 May 2017 | Koševo | FK Sarajevo | 1–0 | FK Željezničar | Report | FK Sarajevo, 1921.tv |
| 49 | 19 August 2017 | Koševo | FK Sarajevo | 0–1 | FK Željezničar | Report | 1921.tv |
| 50 | 27 November 2017 | Grbavica | FK Željezničar | 2–1 | FK Sarajevo | Report | 1921.tv |
| 51 | 15 April 2018 | Koševo | FK Sarajevo | 0–0 | FK Željezničar | Report | 1921.tv |
| 52 | 19 May 2018 | Grbavica | FK Željezničar | 2–1 | FK Sarajevo | Report | 1921.tv |
| 53 | 15 August 2018 | Grbavica | FK Željezničar | 2–2 | FK Sarajevo | Report | FK Sarajevo, 1921.tv |
| 54 | 3 November 2018 | Koševo | FK Sarajevo | 2–1 | FK Željezničar | Report | FK Sarajevo, 1921.tv |
| 55 | 6 April 2019 | Grbavica | FK Željezničar | 0–3 | FK Sarajevo | Report | FK Sarajevo, 1921.tv |
| 56 | 31 August 2019 | Grbavica | FK Željezničar | 5–2 | FK Sarajevo | Report | 1921.tv |
| 57 | 30 November 2019 | Koševo | FK Sarajevo | 1–3 | FK Željezničar | Report | FK Sarajevo, 1921.tv |
| 58 | 4 November 2020 | Koševo | FK Sarajevo | 1–1 | FK Željezničar | Report | Arena Sport |
| 59 | 1 March 2021 | Grbavica | FK Željezničar | 0–0 | FK Sarajevo | Report | Arena Sport |
| 60 | 1 May 2021 | Koševo | FK Sarajevo | 3–1 | FK Željezničar | Report | Arena Sport |
| 61 | 22 September 2021 | Koševo | FK Sarajevo | 2–0 | FK Željezničar | Report | Arena Sport |
| 62 | 5 March 2022 | Grbavica | FK Željezničar | 2–0 | FK Sarajevo | Report | Arena Sport |
| 63 | 10 May 2022 | Koševo | FK Sarajevo | 1–1 | FK Željezničar | Report | Arena Sport |
| 64 | 26 August 2022 | Grbavica | FK Željezničar | 2–2 | FK Sarajevo | Report | Arena Sport |
| 65 | 8 March 2023 | Bosnian FA Training Centre, Zenica | FK Sarajevo | 0–0 | FK Željezničar | Report | Arena Sport |
| 66 | 12 May 2023 | Koševo | FK Sarajevo | 2–2 | FK Željezničar | Report | Arena Sport |
| 67 | 8 October 2023 | Koševo | FK Sarajevo | 3–0 | FK Željezničar | Report | Arena Sport |
| 68 | 3 March 2024 | Grbavica | FK Željezničar | 3–0 | FK Sarajevo | Report | Arena Sport |
| 69 | 14 April 2024 | Grbavica | FK Željezničar | 0–0 | FK Sarajevo | Report | Arena Sport |
| 70 | 25 September 2024 | Koševo | FK Sarajevo | 1–1 | FK Željezničar | Report | Arena Sport |
| 71 | 22 February 2025 | Grbavica | FK Željezničar | 0–0 | FK Sarajevo | Report | Arena Sport |
| 72 | 27 April 2025 | Koševo | FK Sarajevo | 2–1 | FK Željezničar | Report | Arena Sport |
| 73 | 27 September 2025 | Grbavica | FK Željezničar | 2–0 | FK Sarajevo | Report | Arena Sport |
| 74 | 7 December 2025 | Koševo | FK Sarajevo | 4–0 | FK Željezničar | Report | Arena Sport |
| 75 | 4 April 2026 | Grbavica | FK Željezničar | 0–0 | FK Sarajevo | Report | Arena Sport |
| 76 | 25 May 2026 | Koševo | FK Sarajevo | 1–0 | FK Željezničar | Report | Arena Sport |
| 77 | 9 September 2026 | Grbavica | FK Željezničar | 2–0 | FK Sarajevo | Report | Arena Sport |
| 78 | 24 October 2026 | Koševo | FK Sarajevo | 2–0 | FK Željezničar | Report | Arena Sport |

| Colors | |
|---|---|
| | Sarajevo win |
| | Draw |
| | Željezničar win |

== Little derby ==
Both of the big Sarajevo clubs have a rivalry with Slavija Sarajevo, a club dominated by Bosnian Serbs in eastern Sarajevo.

Another football club from Sarajevo was Olimpik; located in the neighbourhood of Otoka, but their support group was very small.

Olimpik's games between its rivals, FK Sarajevo and FK Željezničar, in town were known as the little town derby (Mali gradski derbi).
