= 1999–2000 First League of Bosnia and Herzegovina =

Association football competition

Statistics of First League of Bosnia and Herzegovina in the 1999–2000 season. It was contested only by Bosniak and Croatian clubs. Serbian clubs played in the 1999–2000 First League of the Republika Srpska.

== Overview ==
It was contested by 8 teams, and Brotnjo won the championship.

== First round ==
=== First League of Football Association of Bosnia and Herzegovina ===
Location of clubs in Bosniaks 1st League 1999-00

==== League standings ====
Pos	Team	Pld	W	D	L	GF	GA	GD	Pts	Qualification or relegation
1	Jedinstvo Bihać	30	18	3	9	46	22	+24	57	Qualification to championship play-off
2	Željezničar	30	17	5	8	58	32	+26	56	UEFA Cup qualifying round and championship play-off (Note: Željezničar won 1999–2000 Bosnian Cup and qualified for the qualifying round of the UEFA Cup.)
3	Sarajevo	30	16	7	7	54	24	+30	55	Qualification to championship play-off
4	Rudar Kakanj	30	16	6	8	41	28	+13	54	Qualification to championship play-off
5	Budućnost	30	15	8	7	38	21	+17	53	Qualification to championship play-off
6	Đerzelez	30	15	7	8	49	36	+13	52	Qualification to Intertoto Cup play-off
7	Velež	30	14	6	10	59	37	+22	48	
8	Sloboda Tuzla	30	14	5	11	41	31	+10	47	
9	Čelik	30	13	8	9	45	36	+9	47	
10	Iskra	30	10	8	12	33	32	+1	38	
11	Krajina	30	11	4	15	31	36	−5	37	
12	Bosna (R)	30	10	6	14	34	36	−2	36	Relegation to Prva Liga FBiH
13	TOŠK (R)	30	9	8	13	28	35	−7	35	Relegation to Prva Liga FBiH
14	Lukavac (R)	30	9	4	17	25	47	−22	31	Relegation to Prva Liga FBiH
15	Gradina Srebrenik (R)	30	7	3	20	18	67	−49	24	Relegation to Prva Liga FBiH
16	Drina Zvornik-Živinice (R)	30	2	0	28	17	97	−80	6	Relegation to Prva Liga FBiH

Source: RSSSF.org
Rules for classification: 1) points; 2) goal difference; 3) number of goals scored.
(R) Relegated

==== Results ====
Home \ Away	BOS	BUD	ČEL	ĐER	DRZ	GRA	ISK	JED	KRA	LUK	RKA	SAR	SLO	TOŠ	VEL	ŽEL
Bosna		2–0	4–1	1–1	4–0	0–0	1–0	1–0	1–2	2–0	1–1	4–0	2–3	1–0	1–1	1–3
Budućnost	4–0		0–0	1–0	3–0	2–0	2–1	1–0	2–1	2–1	1–0	0–0	1–0	3–1	0–0	1–0
Čelik	2–0	1–1		3–1	2–0	5–0	2–1	3–3	3–0	1–0	4–1	1–0	0–0	1–1	2–0	1–1
Đerzelez	1–0	3–2	3–2		4–1	3–0	2–2	1–0	2–1	3–1	2–0	1–1	2–1	0–0	3–1	3–0
Drina Zvornik-Živinice	1–3	0–3	0–4	1–3		0–2	0–2	0–8	2–1	0–1	0–3	1–2	0–2	0–4	5–3	1–2
Gradina Srebrenik	3–1	0–4	0–0	1–3	2–1		1–0	0–1	1–0	0–0	0–1	1–5	2–1	1–0	0–3	2–6
Iskra	1–0	0–0	3–0	2–0	4–0	2–0		0–1	2–1	1–1	3–1	0–0	2–2	2–1	1–2	1–0
Jedinstvo Bihać	1–0	2–1	2–0	1–1	4–1	4–0	2–0		1–0	4–0	2–0	0–2	2–1	2–0	2–1	1–0
Krajina	1–1	1–0	1–2	1–1	2–0	2–0	1–0	1–1		2–0	1–2	3–1	0–0	2–0	2–1	1–0
Lukavac	0–1	0–2	1–0	1–0	3–1	2–1	2–1	0–1	0–3		1–3	3–0	0–1	0–0	2–1	2–3
Rudar Kakanj	1–0	4–2	2–0	2–1	2–0	4–0	0–0	1–0	2–0	0–1		0–0	1–0	2–0	2–0	1–1
Sarajevo	1–0	3–0	3–1	1–1	5–0	4–0	0–0	1–0	3–0	3–0	1–1		4–0	3–0	5–1	4–1
Sloboda Tuzla	2–0	0–0	3–1	3–1	3–1	5–1	2–0	0–1	3–1	2–0	0–1	1–2		2–1	2–0	2–0
TOŠK	3–1	0–0	0–1	0–2	3–1	1–0	1–1	2–0	1–0	2–2	2–1	1–0	0–0		2–2	1–0
Velež	2–0	0–0	3–0	2–0	8–0	4–0	4–0	2–0	2–0	5–0	1–1	1–0	3–0	3–1		2–2
Željezničar	1–1	1–0	2–2	4–1	5–0	3–0	3–1	2–0	2–0	2–1	4–1	2–0	2–0	2–0	4–1	

Source: RSSSF.org
Legend: Blue = home team win; Yellow = draw; Red = away team win.

=== First League of Herzeg-Bosnia ===
Location of clubs in 1st League of Herzeg-Bosnia 1999-00

==== League standings ====
Pos	Team	Pld	W	D	L	GF	GA	GD	Pts	Qualification or relegation
1	Posušje	26	19	4	3	54	14	+40	61	Qualification to championship play-off
2	Brotnjo Čitluk	26	18	3	5	63	21	+42	57	Qualification to championship play-off
3	Široki Brijeg	26	14	6	6	53	23	+30	48	Qualification to championship play-off
4	Čapljina	26	13	5	8	42	34	+8	44	
5	Kiseljak	26	13	4	9	37	27	+10	43	
6	Zrinjski Mostar	26	12	7	7	45	30	+15	43	Qualification to Intertoto Cup play-off
7	Ljubuški	26	10	10	6	45	22	+23	40	
8	Orašje	26	11	2	13	39	32	+7	35	
9	Troglav Livno	26	10	1	15	27	40	−13	31	
10	GOŠK Gabela (R)	26	7	4	15	25	62	−37	25	Relegation to Prva Liga FBiH
11	Vitez (R)	26	6	7	13	17	42	−25	25	Relegation to Prva Liga FBiH
12	Žepče (R)	26	7	2	17	24	52	−28	23	Relegation to Prva Liga FBiH
13	Redarstvenik Mostar (R)	26	6	4	16	21	50	−29	22	Relegation to Prva Liga FBiH
14	Stolac (R)	26	4	5	17	12	55	−43	17	Relegation to Prva Liga FBiH

(R) Relegated

== Play-offs ==
=== Group stage ===
Key to colours in group tables
Group winners advance to the Final

==== Group A ====
Team	Pld	W	D	L	GF	GA	GD	Pts
Budućnost	6	4	0	2	10	7	+3	12
Široki Brijeg	6	4	0	2	8	7	+1	12
Posušje	6	2	1	3	8	8	0	7
Željezničar	6	1	1	4	4	8	−4	4

24 May 2000
Budućnost	3–0	Široki Brijeg
Posušje	1–1	Željezničar
28 May 2000
Posušje	2–0	Budućnost
Željezničar	1–0	Široki Brijeg
1 June 2000
Budućnost	1–0	Željezničar
Široki Brijeg	3–2	Posušje
5 June 2000
Široki Brijeg	3–1	Budućnost
Željezničar	1–2	Posušje
9 June 2000
Budućnost	2–1	Posušje
Široki Brijeg	1–0	Željezničar
11 June 2000
Željezničar	1–3	Budućnost
Posušje	0–1	Široki Brijeg

==== Group B ====
Team	Pld	W	D	L	GF	GA	GD	Pts
Brotnjo	6	4	0	2	12	7	+5	12
Jedinstvo Bihać	6	4	0	2	10	6	+4	12
Sarajevo	6	4	0	2	14	6	+8	12
Rudar Kakanj	6	0	0	6	2	19	−17	0

Head-to-head table
Team	Pld	W	D	L	GF	GA	GD	Pts
Brotnjo	4	2	0	2	6	6	0	6
Jedinstvo Bihać	4	2	0	2	6	6	0	6
Sarajevo	4	2	0	2	5	5	0	6

- Brotnjo - Jedinstvo Bihać 3–0
- Jedinstvo Bihać - Brotnjo 3–1

24 May 2000
Sarajevo	2–0	Brotnjo
Jedinstvo Bihać	3–0	Rudar Kakanj
28 May 2000
Jedinstvo Bihać	2–0	Sarajevo
Rudar Kakanj	1–2	Brotnjo
1 June 2000
Sarajevo	2–0	Rudar Kakanj
Brotnjo	3–0	Jedinstvo Bihać
5 June 2000
Brotnjo	2–1	Sarajevo
Rudar Kakanj	0–1	Jedinstvo Bihać
9 June 2000
Sarajevo	2–1	Jedinstvo Bihać
Brotnjo	4–0	Rudar Kakanj
11 June 2000
Rudar Kakanj	1–7	Sarajevo
Jedinstvo Bihać	3–1	Brotnjo

=== Final ===
==== First leg ====
13 June 2000
15:00

Budućnost	1–1	Brotnjo
Kuljaninović 52'		Brašnić 44'

Gradski stadion, Banovići
Attendance: 3,500
Referee: Ante Kovač

==== Second leg ====
15 June 2000
16:00

Brotnjo	0–0	Budućnost

Bare Stadium, Čitluk
Attendance: 8,000
Referee: Sead Kulović

Brotnjo 1–1 Budućnost Banovići on aggregate. Brotnjo won on away goals rule and qualified for 2000–01 UEFA Champions League (first qualifying round), while Budućnost qualified for 2000–01 UEFA Cup (qualifying round).

=== Intertoto Cup play-off ===
Team 1	Agg.	Team 2	1st leg	2nd leg
Đerzelez	0–0 (2–3 p)	Zrinjski	0–0	0–0

Zrinjski was qualified for 2000 UEFA Intertoto Cup (first round).

== See also ==
- 1999–2000 First League of the Republika Srpska
