= 2006–07 First League of the Federation of Bosnia and Herzegovina =

The 2006–07 First League of the Federation of Bosnia and Herzegovina season was the seventh since its establishment.

== League standings ==
Pos	Team	Pld	W	D	L	GF	GA	GD	Pts	Promotion or relegation
1	Travnik (C, P)	30	18	2	10	43	35	+8	56	Promotion to Premijer liga BiH
2	Rudar Kakanj	30	17	4	9	48	23	+25	55	
3	Zvijezda Gradačac	30	16	4	10	45	28	+17	52	
4	SAŠK Napredak	30	16	1	13	36	32	+4	49	
5	Troglav Livno	30	14	4	12	43	35	+8	46	
6	GOŠK Gabela	30	14	3	13	38	42	−4	45	
7	Gradina Srebrenik	30	13	4	13	37	33	+4	43	
8	Budućnost	30	12	7	11	30	28	+2	43	
9	Igman Konjic	30	13	3	14	48	42	+6	42	
10	Bosna Visoko	30	13	2	15	35	42	−7	41	
11	Brotnjo	30	13	2	15	35	43	−8	41	
12	Radnički Lukavac	30	12	5	13	30	38	−8	41	
13	MIS Kreševo	30	12	5	13	40	46	−6	41	
14	Krajina Cazin (R)	30	11	5	14	27	32	−5	38	Relegation to Second League FBiH
15	Mramor (R)	30	10	2	18	36	54	−18	32	Relegation to Second League FBiH
16	TOŠK Tešanj (R)	30	8	5	17	30	50	−20	29	Relegation to Second League FBiH

Source: RSSSF.org
Rules for classification: 1) points; 2) goal difference; 3) number of goals scored.
(C) Champions; (P) Promoted; (R) Relegated
