= FK Krajina =

FK Krajina can refer to:

- FK Krajina Cazin
- FK Krajina Banja Luka
