= Denis Mujkić =

Bosnian footballer and manager

Personal information
- Full name: Denis Mujkić
- Date of birth: 2 September 1983 (age 43)
- Place of birth: Tuzla, SFR Yugoslavia
- Height: 1.93 m (6 ft 4 in)
- Position: Goalkeeper

Youth career
- –2002: Budućnosst Banovići

Senior career*
Years	Team	Apps	(Gls)
2002–2005	Budućnost Banovići	21	(0)
2005–2008	Jedinstvo Bihać	97	(0)
2008–2012	Sloboda Tuzla	109	(0)
2012	Novi Pazar	4	(0)
2013–2022	Budućnost Banovići	173	(0)
Total		404	(0)

International career
2007	Bosnia and Herzegovina XI	1	(0)

Managerial career
- 2022–2023: Budućnost Banovići
- * Club domestic league appearances and goals

Denis Mujkić (born 2 September 1983) is a Bosnian professional football manager and former player.

== Club career ==
Born in Tuzla, SR Bosnia and Herzegovina, at time still within Yugoslavia, Mujkić started playing with Budućnosst Banovići. After a spell at Jedinstvo Bihać, he joined Sloboda Tuzla where he plays 4 seasons. Mujkić played with all 3 clubs in the Bosnian Premier League. In 2012, he signed with Serbian SuperLiga side Novi Pazar. After playing in Serbia, he returned to Bosnia and joined his former club Budućnost, now playing in the First League of FBiH.

== International career ==
In 2007, Mujkić played one game for an unofficial Bosnia and Herzegovina selection.
