= 1920–21 Sarajevo Football Subassociation First League =

Sarajevo Football Subassociation First League
- Season: 1920–21
- Champions: Hajduk
- Goals scored: 88

The 1920–21 Sarajevo Football Subassociation First League (Prvi razred Sarajevskog podsaveza / Први разред Сарајевског подсавеза) was the first season of the Sarajevo Football Subassociation First League. Hajduk have won the league, becoming the first ever champions of Bosnia and Herzegovina. The league was organized by the Sarajevo Football Subassociation (bosn. Sarajevski Podsavez). The league consisted of seven clubs in Sarajevo, four based on religious and ethnic affiliation: SAŠK, Građanski as Bosnian Croatian, Slavija, Troja affiliated to Bosnian Serbs, Bosnian Muslim's Sarajevski and Barkohba as Bosnian Jewish club; while only multi-ethnic was worker's club RŠD Hajduk.

== Final table ==
Pos	Team	P	W	D	L	F	A	GD	Pts
1	Hajduk	5	4	0	1	19	2	+17	8
2	Slavija	5	4	0	1	29	4	+25	8
3	SAŠK	5	4	0	1	23	4	+19	8
4	Sarajevski	4	3	0	1	10	4	+6	6
5	Troja	6	1	1	4	4	41	-37	3
6	Barkohba	6	1	0	5	3	15	-12	2
7	Građanski	5	0	1	4	0	18	-18	1
