= 2009–10 First League of the Federation of Bosnia and Herzegovina =

Season of a second tier association football league in Bosnia and Herzegovina

First League of the Federation of Bosnia and Herzegovina
- Season: 2009-10
- Champions: Budućnost
- Promoted: Budućnost
- Relegated: Vitez; Žepče
- Matches: 210
- Goals: 579 (2.76 per match)

The 2009–10 First League of the Federation of Bosnia and Herzegovina season was the tenth since its establishment. Budućnost was the champion and won promotion. Vitez and Žepče were relegated.

== League standings ==
Pos	Team	Pld	W	D	L	GF	GA	GD	Pts	Promotion or relegation
1	Budućnost (C, P)	28	20	2	6	51	20	+31	62	Promotion to Premijer Liga BiH
2	Orašje	28	16	0	12	45	34	+11	48	
3	Iskra	28	14	5	9	50	26	+24	47	
4	Rudar Kakanj	28	14	5	9	40	29	+11	47	
5	SAŠK Napredak	28	13	3	12	43	38	+5	42	
6	Bosna Visoko	28	13	2	13	47	41	+6	41	
7	GOŠK Gabela	28	13	1	14	36	31	+5	40	
8	Igman	28	12	4	12	41	37	+4	40	
9	Slaven Živinice	28	12	4	12	33	40	−7	40	
10	Krajišnik	28	12	4	12	37	48	−11	40	
11	Omladinac	28	12	2	14	37	50	−13	38	
12	Goražde	28	11	4	13	29	39	−10	37	
13	Jedinstvo Bihać	28	11	4	13	33	47	−14	37	
14	Vitez (R)	28	11	3	14	37	40	−3	36	Relegation to Second League FBiH
15	Žepče (R)	28	3	3	22	20	59	−39	12	Relegation to Second League FBiH

Source: Futbol24.com
Rules for classification: 1) points; 2) goal difference; 3) number of goals scored.
(C) Champions; (P) Promoted; (R) Relegated
