= 2002–03 Bosnia and Herzegovina Football Cup =

Tournament details
- Country: Bosnia and Herzegovina
- Teams: 32

Final positions
- Champions: Željezničar; 3rd national cup title
- Runners-up: Leotar

2002–03 Bosnia and Herzegovina Football Cup was the ninth season of the Bosnia and Herzegovina's annual football cups, and the third season of the unified competition. The competition started on 6 November 2002 with the First Round and concluded on 27 May 2003 with the Final.

== First round ==
Thirty-two teams entered in the First Round. The first legs were played on 6 November and the second legs were played on 10 November 2002.

| Team 1 | Agg. | Team 2 | 1st leg | 2nd leg |
|---|---|---|---|---|
| Borac Banja Luka | 6–2 | Podgrmeč Sanski Most | 4–1 | 2–1 |
| Modriča Maxima | 2–0 | Posušje | 2–0 | 0–0 |
| Grude | 2–3 | Leotar | 1–0 | 1–3 |
| Široki Brijeg | 2–1 | Čelik Zenica | 1–0 | 1–1 |
| Rudar Kakanj | 5–4 | Ljubić Prnjavor | 3–1 | 2–3 |
| Zrinjski | 1–1 (4–2 p) | Radnik Bijeljina | 1–0 | 0–1 |
| Troglav | 1–10 | Sarajevo | 0–3 | 1–7 |
| Kozara Gradiška | 4–4 (a) | Sloboda Tuzla | 3–0 | 1–4 |
| Saobraćajac Sarajevo | 2–2 (3–5 p) | Brotnjo | 1–1 | 1–1 |
| Sloga Prud | 2–12 | Željezničar | 1–7 | 1–5 |
| Jedinstvo Bihać | 11–2 | Budućnost Banovići | 7–0 | 4–2 |
| Velež | 6–1 | Bosna Visoko | 4–0 | 2–1 |
| Rudar Ugljevik | 7–5 | Mladost Gacko | 5–0 | 2–5 |
| Glasinac Sokolac | 3–1 | Sloga Tojšići | 2–0 | 1–1 |
| Orašje | 2–1 | Slavija | 1–1 | 1–0 |
| Zovko Žepče | 4–2 | Goražde | 3–1 | 1–1 |

== Second round ==
The 16 winners from the prior round enter this round. The first legs were played on 27 November and the second legs were played on 30 November 2002.

| Team 1 | Agg. | Team 2 | 1st leg | 2nd leg |
|---|---|---|---|---|
| Rudar Kakanj | 5–8 | Zrinjski | 5–0 | 0–8 |
| Glasinac Sokolac | 0–2 | Modriča Maxima | 0–0 | 0–2 |
| Željezničar | 4–3 | Jedinstvo Bihać | 4–1 | 0–2 |
| Široki Brijeg | 6–7 | Velež | 6–2 | 0–5 |
| Borac Banja Luka | 8–1 | Orašje | 5–0 | 3–1 |
| Leotar | 4–2 | Brotnjo | 3–0 | 1–2 |
| Sarajevo | 7–0 | Rudar Ugljevik | 4–0 | 3–0 |
| Kozara Gradiška | 2–6 | Zovko Žepče | 1–1 | 1–5 |

== Quarterfinals ==
The eight winners from the prior round enter this round. The first legs were played on 15 February and the second legs were played on 5 March 2003.

| Team 1 | Agg. | Team 2 | 1st leg | 2nd leg |
|---|---|---|---|---|
| Leotar | 13–2 | Velež | 10–0 | 3–2 |
| Borac | 1–2 | Zrinjski | 1–0 | 0–2 |
| Modriča Maxima | 2–3 | Željezničar | 2–1 | 0–2 |
| Sarajevo | 2–2 (3–4 p) | Zovko Žepče | 1–1 | 1–1 |

== Semifinals ==
The four winners from the prior round enter this round. The first legs will be played on 19 March and the second legs were played on 9 April 2003.

| Team 1 | Agg. | Team 2 | 1st leg | 2nd leg |
|---|---|---|---|---|
| Leotar | 1–1 (6–5 p) | Zrinjski | 1–0 | 0–1 |
| Zovko Žepče | 1–3 | Željezničar | 1–1 | 0–2 |

== Final ==
=== First leg ===
14 May 2003

| Leotar | 0–0 | Željezničar |
|---|---|---|
| | Report |

Stadion Police, Trebinje
Attendance: 3,000
Referee: Zijad Čanić (Prijedor)

=== Second leg ===
27 May 2003

| Željezničar | 2–0 | Leotar |
|---|---|---|
| Mešić 14'; Gredić 33' (pen.) | Report |

Stadion Koševo, Sarajevo
Attendance: 9,000
Referee: Novo Panić (Doboj)

Željezničar won 2–0 on aggregate.

== See also ==
- 2002–03 Premier League of Bosnia and Herzegovina
