= 2000–01 First League of the Republika Srpska =

Football league

The 2000–01 First League of the Republika Srpska was the 6th football season since establishment in the Republika Srpska. Since Football Association of Republika Srpska is not a member of UEFA nor FIFA, league champion did not qualify for European tournament.

== League table ==
Pos	Team	Pld	W	D	L	GF	GA	GD	Pts	Relegation
1	Borac Banja Luka (C)	30	20	3	7	66	22	+44	63	
2	Sloboda Novi Grad	30	15	6	9	50	39	+11	51	
3	Rudar Ugljevik	30	15	5	10	45	32	+13	50	
4	Boksit	30	15	3	12	55	36	+19	48	
5	BSK	30	14	6	10	39	28	+11	48	
6	Leotar	30	13	8	9	58	37	+21	47	
7	Mladost Gacko	30	14	3	13	46	31	+15	45	
8	Modriča	30	14	3	13	41	44	−3	45	
9	Kozara	30	14	1	15	48	46	+2	43	
10	Radnik	30	12	5	13	34	37	−3	41	
11	Ljubić	30	11	7	12	35	39	−4	40	
12	Slavija	30	12	3	15	38	51	−13	39	
13	Glasinac	30	10	7	13	26	41	−15	37	
14	Polet	30	12	0	18	43	49	−6	36	
15	Rudar Prijedor (R)	30	8	7	15	38	59	−21	31	Relegation to Second League RS
16	Lijevče (R)	30	6	3	21	28	99	−71	21	Relegation to Second League RS

Source: BIHSoccer.com, RSSSF.org
Rules for classification: 1) points; 2) goal difference; 3) number of goals scored.
(C) Champions; (R) Relegated

== See also ==
- 2000–01 Premier League of Bosnia and Herzegovina
