= Miro Klaić =

Bosnian-Herzegovinian footballer

Personal information
- Full name: Miro Klaić
- Date of birth: July 12, 1976 (age 50)
- Place of birth: Brčko, SFR Yugoslavia
- Height: 1.77 m (5 ft 10 in)
- Position: Defender

Team information
- Current team: HNK Orašje

Senior career*
Years	Team	Apps	(Gls)
2000–2001	Brotnjo Čitluk		
2001–2003	Široki Brijeg	7	(0)
2003–2010	Orašje	89	(0)

International career^{‡}
2000	Bosnia and Herzegovina	2	(0)
- * Club domestic league appearances and goals as of July 2009 ‡ National team caps and goals as of 1 December 2009

Miro Klaić (born July 12, 1976) is a Bosnian-Herzegovinian retired footballer who primarily played for HNK Orašje in the Premier League of Bosnia and Herzegovina.

== International career ==
He made his debut for Bosnia and Herzegovina in a March 2000 friendly match against Macedonia and has earned a total of 2 caps, scoring no goals. His second and final international was an August 2000 friendly against Turkey.
