= NK TOŠK Tešanj =

TOŠK Tešanj
- Full name: Nogometni Klub TOŠK Tešanj
- Nickname: Atomci (Atomics)
- Founded: 1927; 99 years ago
- Ground: Stadion Luke, Tešanj
- Capacity: 7,000
- President: Edin Mujčić
- Manager: Milenko Bošnjaković
- League: First League of FBiH
- 2025–26: First League of FBiH, 7th of 14
- Website: http://tosk.ba/
Home colours	Away colours

Nogometni klub TOŠK Tešanj, commonly known as TOŠK Tešanj or just TOŠK is a professional association football club based in the city of Tešanj that is situated in Bosnia and Herzegovina.

TOŠK hosts their home matches at the Stadion Luke, which has a capacity of 7,000 seats. The club currently plays in the First League of the Federation of Bosnia and Herzegovina.

== History ==
=== Foundation and First League football ===
TOŠK was founded in 1927. So far, one of the club's biggest successes was, when it competed in the First League of Bosnia and Herzegovina, in the 1999–2000 season.

After the relegation in that season to the First League of FBiH, TOŠK got relegated to the Second League of FBiH two times. The first time being in the 2002–03 season, after which they got promoted back up in the 2005–06 season, and the second time being in the 2006–07 First League of FBiH season.

=== Present years ===
In the 2016–17 Second League of FBiH (Group Center) season, ten years after relegation, TOŠK finished in 1st place that season, and got promoted back up to the First League of FBiH for the 2017–18 season. The club has been playing in the First League of FBiH ever since.

TOŠK's next big result came in the 2018–19 season when the team made it all the way to the semi-final of the 2018–19 Bosnian Cup. On its way to the semi-final, TOŠK eliminated Goražde, GOŠK Gabela and Zvijezda Gradačac, before succumbing to Široki Brijeg in the semi-final.

== Honours ==
=== Domestic ===
==== League ====
- First League of the Federation of Bosnia and Herzegovina:
  - Runners-up (2): 1998–99, 2019–20
- Second League of the Federation of Bosnia and Herzegovina:
  - Winners (2): 2005–06 (center), 2016–17 (center)

==== Cups ====
- Bosnia and Herzegovina Cup:
  - Semi-finalists (1): 2018–19

== Managerial history ==
- (Bosnia and Herzegovina) Fahrudin Zejnilović (30 June 1998 – 1 July 2000)
- (Bosnia and Herzegovina) Nikola Nikić (1 July 2011 – 10 July 2011)
- (Bosnia and Herzegovina) Igor Remetić (1 July 2016 – 11 September 2017)
- (Bosnia and Herzegovina) Denis Sadiković (12 September 2018 – 1 April 2018)
- (Bosnia and Herzegovina) Fuad Grbešić (2 April 2018 – 22 April 2018)
- (Bosnia and Herzegovina) Ajdin Mrguda (27 April 2018 – 10 September 2018)
- (Bosnia and Herzegovina) Fuad Grbešić (13 September 2018 – 31 December 2018)
- (Bosnia and Herzegovina) Ajdin Mrguda (1 February 2019 – 10 June 2019)
- (Bosnia and Herzegovina) Nusret Muslimović (28 June 2019 – 1 September 2019)
- (Bosnia and Herzegovina) Arnes Handžić (interim) (2 September 2019 – 8 September 2019)
- (Bosnia and Herzegovina) Nermin Šabić (8 September 2019 – 23 December 2019)
- (Bosnia and Herzegovina) Igor Remetić (3 January 2020 – 6 September 2020)
- (Bosnia and Herzegovina) Dženan Zaimović (19 September 2020 – 11 October 2022)
- (Bosnia and Herzegovina) Bakir Šerbo (25 October 2022 – 31 December 2022)
- (Bosnia and Herzegovina) Samir Smajlović (20 January 2023 – 30 June 2023)
- (Bosnia and Herzegovina) Elvedin Beganović (9 July 2023 – 18 September 2023)
- (Bosnia and Herzegovina) Muamer Salibašić (6 October 2023 – 27 December 2023)
- (Bosnia and Herzegovina) Dženan Hošić (11 January 2024 – 15 June 2024)
- (Bosnia and Herzegovina) Nebojša Đekanović (17 June 2024 – 5 March 2026)
- (Bosnia and Herzegovina) Nihad Alić (5 March 2026 – 8 June 2026)
- (Bosnia and Herzegovina) Milenko Bošnjaković (15 June 2026 – present)
