= 2000–01 Premier League of Bosnia and Herzegovina =

Premijer Liga
- Season: 2000–01
- Champions: Željezničar; 1st Premier League title 2nd Bosnian title 3rd Domestic title
- Relegated: Travnik; Budućnost; Kiseljak; Rudar (K); Čapljina; Ljubuški; Krajina; Đerzelez
- Champions League: Željezničar
- UEFA Cup: Brotnjo; Sarajevo
- Intertoto Cup: Čelik
- Matches played: 462
- Goals scored: 1,381 (2.99 per match)
- Top goalscorer: Dželaludin Muharemović (31 goals)

Statistics of Premier League of Bosnia and Herzegovina in the 2000–01 season. It was contested by Bosniak and Croatian clubs. Serbian clubs played in the 2000–01 First League of the Republika Srpska.

== Overview ==
It was contested by 22 teams, and FK Željezničar Sarajevo won the championship. The season was the first season all teams from Federation of Bosnia and Herzegovina, either Bosniaks and Croats, played in the same league, unlike the two-stage league in previous seasons. Đerzelez conceded a record 198 goals in the league even to this day. At the end, six clubs were relegated and Željezničar striker Dželaludin Muharemović became top goalscorer with 31.

== Clubs and stadiums ==
Location of clubs in Premijer Liga 2000-01

Club	City	Stadium
Brotnjo	Čitluk	Bare Stadium
Budućnost	Banovići	Gradski stadion (Banovići)
Čapljina	Čapljina	Stadion Bjelave
Čelik	Zenica	Bilino Polje
Đerzelez Zenica	Zenica	
Iskra	Bugojno	Stadion Jaklić
Jedinstvo	Bihać	Stadion pod Borićima
Kiseljak	Kiseljak	Stadion Hrvatskih Branitelja
Krajina	Cazin	Gradski stadion (Cazin)
Ljubuški	Ljubuški	Stadion Babovac
Olimpik	Sarajevo	Stadion Otoka
Orašje	Orašje	Gradski stadion (Orašje)
Posušje	Posušje	Mokri Dolac Stadium
Rudar	Kakanj	Stadion pod Vardom
Sarajevo	Sarajevo	Asim Ferhatović Hase Stadium
Sloboda	Tuzla	Stadion Tušanj
Široki Brijeg	Široki Brijeg	Stadion Pecara
Travnik	Travnik	Stadion Pirota
Troglav	Livno	Stadion Zgona
Velež	Mostar	Vrapčići Stadium
Zrinjski	Mostar	Stadion pod Bijelim Brijegom
Željezničar	Sarajevo	Stadion Grbavica

== League standings ==
Pos	Team	Pld	W	D	L	GF	GA	GD	Pts	Qualification or relegation
1	Željezničar (C)	42	28	7	7	113	38	+75	91	Qualification to Champions League first qualifying round
2	Brotnjo	42	26	6	10	83	25	+58	84	Qualification to UEFA Cup qualifying round
3	Sarajevo	42	24	9	9	81	35	+46	81	Qualification to UEFA Cup qualifying round
4	Čelik	42	21	10	11	75	40	+35	73	Qualification to Intertoto Cup first round
5	Velež	42	22	3	17	87	54	+33	69	
6	Jedinstvo Bihać	42	20	8	14	67	40	+27	68	
7	Široki Brijeg	42	18	11	13	72	43	+29	65	
8	Posušje	42	20	5	17	59	43	+16	65	
9	Iskra	42	17	14	11	55	49	+6	65	
10	Troglav	42	19	8	15	59	57	+2	65	
11	Sloboda Tuzla	42	17	13	12	54	41	+13	64	
12	Orašje	42	19	6	17	66	54	+12	63	
13	Zrinjski	42	19	6	17	65	54	+11	63	
14	Olimpik	42	18	8	16	61	47	+14	62	
15	Travnik (R)	42	18	7	17	65	72	−7	61	Relegation to Prva Liga FBiH
16	Budućnost (R)	42	17	7	18	68	63	+5	58	Relegation to Prva Liga FBiH
17	Kiseljak (R)	42	18	4	20	59	65	−6	58	Relegation to Prva Liga FBiH
18	Rudar Kakanj (R)	42	17	5	20	72	62	+10	56	Relegation to Prva Liga FBiH
19	Čapljina (R)	42	15	6	21	53	71	−18	51	Relegation to Prva Liga FBiH
20	Ljubuški (R)	42	8	5	29	39	86	−47	29	Relegation to Prva Liga FBiH
21	Krajina (R)	42	3	5	34	23	149	−126	14	Relegation to Prva Liga FBiH
22	Đerzelez (R)	42	1	1	40	10	198	−188	4	Relegation to Prva Liga FBiH

Source: RSSSF.org
Rules for classification: 1) points; 2) goal difference; 3) number of goals scored.
(C) Champions; (R) Relegated

== Results ==
Home \ Away	BRO	BUD	ČAP	ČEL	ĐER	ISK	JED	KIS	KRA	LJU	OLI	ORA	POS	RKA	SAR	SLO	ŠB	TRA	TRO	VEL	ZRI	ŽEL
Brotnjo		2–0	3–0	5–1	9–0	5–0	1–0	2–0	11–0	2–0	1–0	1–1	1–3	1–0	1–0	2–1	0–0	4–1	3–0	3–0	3–0	2–0
Budućnost	0–1		3–0	1–1	5–0	4–1	3–0	3–2	4–0	2–0	2–0	6–1	2–1	2–1	1–2	1–2	3–0	1–0	2–2	3–2	2–2	0–1
Čapljina	1–1	3–2		3–1	4–0	0–1	0–1	4–1	4–1	1–3	1–0	0–4	1–0	1–2	0–3	0–2	0–0	2–0	1–1	1–0	2–0	1–0
Čelik	1–0	2–1	4–0		6–0	2–1	1–0	2–0	2–0	2–0	0–0	2–1	3–1	1–1	0–3	1–1	1–3	4–0	4–1	2–0	1–0	0–1
Đerzelez	0–6	1–1	2–3	0–5		1–6	0–3	0–2	2–1	0–4	0–10	0–6	0–5	0–9	0–2	0–4	0–6	0–3	0–3	0–9	0–2	0–6
Iskra	0–0	1–1	0–0	1–1	2–0		4–1	1–1	2–0	0–0	1–0	1–0	1–0	2–1	0–0	0–0	2–2	3–1	2–2	2–1	1–0	3–0
Jedinstvo Bihać	2–0	4–1	2–1	0–0	3–0	0–0		2–0	7–0	5–0	1–1	3–0	3–1	1–0	1–1	4–0	1–1	2–0	3–0	2–0	2–1	2–0
Kiseljak	2–1	2–0	3–2	0–3	3–1	0–1	3–2		3–0	2–0	2–0	2–0	2–0	1–0	2–1	1–0	0–0	2–0	1–2	2–1	2–0	0–0
Krajina	0–1	1–3	1–1	0–7	1–0	0–4	0–0	0–5		2–1	1–5	1–2	1–1	3–1	0–3	1–4	0–0	2–3	1–1	1–5	0–3	1–4
Ljubuški	1–2	0–3	0–4	0–2	5–0	1–4	2–0	3–2	2–0		0–3	1–3	1–3	5–1	1–1	0–1	0–2	1–2	2–0	1–1	0–7	2–2
Olimpik	1–0	0–1	0–3	1–0	3–0	0–1	1–0	2–1	2–1	2–1		2–1	0–0	1–0	1–1	2–0	0–0	5–1	2–1	2–1	4–0	1–7
Orašje	1–0	3–1	1–0	1–2	6–0	4–0	1–0	2–2	2–0	2–1	1–1		0–0	2–1	1–1	2–0	1–0	3–0	3–0	2–0	1–0	2–2
Posušje	0–1	3–0	2–0	1–1	4–0	1–0	1–0	4–0	4–0	2–0	3–1	2–1		2–0	2–2	2–0	0–1	3–2	1–2	1–0	2–1	1–3
Rudar Kakanj	1–1	2–1	2–3	1–0	4–0	3–1	1–1	2–1	8–1	6–0	1–0	1–0	2–0		1–1	1–1	2–1	3–0	3–0	3–2	4–1	2–3
Sarajevo	1–0	3–0	5–2	2–1	8–1	2–0	2–1	3–0	8–0	1–0	0–2	2–0	1–0	1–0		2–0	2–0	3–0	1–3	4–1	2–0	0–3
Sloboda Tuzla	0–1	1–0	1–1	1–1	7–0	1–1	1–0	1–0	3–1	1–0	1–0	1–0	3–0	4–1	0–0		1–1	3–0	2–2	0–0	2–0	1–1
Široki Brijeg	1–3	3–1	5–2	2–0	4–0	1–1	0–1	4–1	9–0	2–1	1–1	5–3	0–1	2–0	2–0	0–0		5–1	2–0	2–0	2–3	1–0
Travnik	1–1	1–1	1–0	1–5	6–0	3–1	1–1	3–1	7–0	3–0	3–2	2–1	2–1	1–0	1–0	1–1	2–0		2–0	3–1	3–1	1–1
Troglav	1–0	0–0	4–1	2–0	3–0	1–0	1–2	1–0	5–0	2–0	2–0	1–0	0–1	3–0	2–4	1–0	2–0	1–1		2–1	2–1	3–3
Velež	2–1	2–0	3–0	2–1	9–1	3–1	3–0	3–0	2–1	3–0	2–0	4–1	3–0	4–1	2–1	3–0	2–1	1–1	4–0		1–0	2–0
Zrinjski	0–1	4–1	2–0	0–0	3–0	2–2	3–2	5–2	1–0	0–0	0–0	4–0	1–0	1–0	2–2	5–2	1–0	2–1	2–0	2–0		3–1
Željezničar	2–0	6–0	4–0	1–1	7–1	4–0	4–2	4–3	8–0	3–0	2–1	2–0	1–0	6–0	1–0	2–0	4–1	4–0	2–0	6–1	3–1	

Source: RSSSF.org
Legend: Blue = home team win; Yellow = draw; Red = away team win.

== See also ==
- 2000–01 First League of the Republika Srpska
