= NK Jedinstvo Bihać =

Jedinstvo Bihać
- Full name: Nogometni Klub Jedinstvo Bihać
- Nickname: Crveno Bijeli
- Founded: 1919; 107 years ago
- Ground: Pod Borićima Stadium
- Capacity: 7,500
- Chairman: Vacant
- Manager: Armin Duvnjak
- League: First League of FBiH
- 2025–26: First League of FBiH, 4th of 14
Home colours	Away colours

Nogometni klub Jedinstvo Bihać is a professional association football club based in the city of Bihać, Bosnia and Herzegovina. They currently play in the First League of the Federation of Bosnia and Herzegovina, the second level of football in the country.

The club's stadium is called Pod Borićima Stadion and it has capacity for 7,500 spectators. The fans of NK Jedinstvo are called Sila Nebeska 96.

== History ==
The first football club in Bihać was founded around 1919 or 1920, with the exact date being unknown due to a non-payment of a membership fee to the football association. Jedinstvo was registered with the football association for the first time in 1937.

Jedinstvo spent several years playing in the Yugoslav Second League between 1979 and the time of their relegation in 1986.

The club appeared in the 1999 UEFA Intertoto Cup, making it to the second round of the competition, eliminating Faroese club GÍ Gøtu in the first round and then getting eliminated by Ceahlăul Piatra Neamț in the second round.

In the 2003–04 league season, Jedinstvo led the start of the Bosnian Premier League, but would fall to last place and be relegated. In the 2004–05 season, Jedinstvo played in the First League of the Federation of Bosnia and Herzegovina, and was promoted back to the Premier League.

In the 2007–08 Premier League season, they were relegated back to the First League of FBiH, where they have been playing ever since.

== Supporters ==
Jedinstvo's fans are called Sila Nebeska. The group was founded in 1996.

== Honours ==
=== Domestic ===
==== League ====
- First League of Bosnia and Herzegovina:
  - Winners (1): 1999–2000 (First Round)
- First League of the Federation of Bosnia and Herzegovina:
  - Winners (1): 2004–05
  - Runners-up (1): 2013–14

== European record ==
Competition	P	W	D	L	GF	GA	GD
UEFA Intertoto Cup	4	1	0	3	5	6	–1
Total	4	1	0	3	5	6	–1

P = Matches played; W = Matches won; D = Matches drawn; L = Matches lost; GF = Goals for; GA = Goals against; GD = Goals difference. Defunct competitions indicated in italics.

=== List of matches ===
Season	Competition	Round	Opponent	Home	Away	Agg.
1999	UEFA Intertoto Cup	R1	(Faroe Islands) Gøtu Ítróttarfelag	3–0	0–1	3–1
1999	UEFA Intertoto Cup	R2	(Romania) Ceahlăul Piatra Neamț	1–2	1–3	2–5

== Club seasons ==
Season	League									Cup	Europe
Season	Division	P	W	D	L	F	A	Pts	Pos	Cup	Europe
1995–96	Bosnian First League	30	15	5	10	48	31	50	5th	QF	
1996–97	Bosnian First League	30	15	3	12	49	33	48	5th		
1997–98	Bosnian First League	30	11	5	14	30	40	38	11th	R16	
1998–99	Bosnian First League	30	13	6	11	37	39	45	6th		
1999–2000	Bosnian First League	30	18	3	9	46	22	57	1st	R32	Intertoto Cup R2
1999–2000	Bosnian First League; Play-offs	6	4	0	2	10	6	12	2nd		Intertoto Cup R2
Current format of Premier League of Bosnia and Herzegovina
2000–01	Bosnian Premier League	42	20	8	14	67	40	68	6th	R1	
2001–02	Bosnian Premier League	30	12	5	13	33	39	41	9th	R1	
2002–03	Bosnian Premier League	38	15	5	18	59	63	50	16th ↓	R2	
2003–04	First League of FBiH	30	13	6	11	57	32	45	3rd		
2004–05	First League of FBiH	30	21	3	6	62	29	66	1st ↑		
2005–06	Bosnian Premier League	30	13	1	16	38	40	40	7th	R1	
2006–07	Bosnian Premier League	30	13	4	13	46	57	43	9th	R1	
2007–08	Bosnian Premier League	30	12	4	14	28	43	40	15th ↓	R1	
2008–09	First League of FBiH	30	15	4	11	46	40	49	4th		
2009–10	First League of FBiH	28	11	4	13	33	47	37	12th	R1	
2010–11	First League of FBiH	30	14	4	12	38	39	56	6th	R1	
2011–12	First League of FBiH	30	11	6	13	48	46	39	11th		
2012–13	First League of FBiH	28	12	5	11	45	33	41	5th		
2013–14	First League of FBiH	30	21	6	3	50	10	69	2nd		
2014–15	First League of FBiH	30	11	9	10	30	23	42	9th	R1	
2015–16	First League of FBiH	30	13	4	13	41	34	43	10th		
2016–17	First League of FBiH	30	12	8	10	34	37	44	10th		
2017–18	First League of FBiH	30	10	3	17	28	63	33	14th		
2018–19	First League of FBiH	30	13	4	13	31	41	43	8th		
2019–20	First League of FBiH	16	5	2	9	20	30	17	14th	R1	
2020–21	First League of FBiH	30	13	4	13	26	36	43	8th		
2021–22	First League of FBiH	30	8	5	17	34	56	29	13th		
2022–23	First League of FBiH	30	11	4	15	40	47	37	11th	R1	
2023–24	First League of FBiH	30	9	6	15	27	51	33	14th	QF	
2024–25	First League of FBiH	28	10	9	9	32	32	39	10th		
2025–26	First League of FBiH	26	12	5	9	29	36	41	4th	R1	
