= NK Kiseljak =

Association football club

- Full name: Nogometni Klub Kiseljak
- Founded: 1921; 104 years ago
- Ground: Croatian Defenders Stadium
- Capacity: 3,000
- League: Second League of FBiH – West I
- 2020-21: 5th
Home colours	Away colours

NK Kiseljak is a Croat-founded football team from the city of Kiseljak, Bosnia and Herzegovina. The club plays in the Second League of the Federation of Bosnia and Herzegovina (West Group). It was formed in 1921 under the name Viktorija, taking on the current name in 1945.

The club plays at the Croatian Defenders Stadium (Croatian: Stadion hrvatskih branitelja) which has a capacity of approximately 3000. While currently in a lower division, NK Kiseljak previously played in the First Federation league and the Premier League.

== Honours ==
=== League ===
- Second League of the Federation of Bosnia and Herzegovina
  - Winners (1): 2010-11
- First League of Herzeg-Bosnia:
  - Runners-up (1): 1994–95

=== Cup ===
- Herzeg-Bosnia Cup
  - Runners-up (1): 1999–00
- Kup SBK/KSB
  - First place (1): 2020–21

== Club seasons ==
Season	League									Cup	Europe
Season	Division	P	W	D	L	F	A	Pts	Pos	Cup	Europe
1997–98	First League of Bosnia and Herzegovina	30	13	5	12	42	37	44	7th		
1998–99	First League of Bosnia and Herzegovina	26	9	5	12	30	35	32	7th		
1999–00	First League of Bosnia and Herzegovina	26	13	4	9	37	27	43	5th		
Current format of Premier League of Bosnia and Herzegovina
2000–01	Premier League of Bosnia and Herzegovina	42	18	4	20	59	65	58	17th ↓		
2001–02	First League of FBiH	28	13	4	11	42	33	43	5th		
2002–03	First League of FBiH	36	18	6	12	52	42	60	4th		
2003–04	First League of FBiH	30	11	7	12	39	41	40	7th		
2004–05	First League of FBiH	30	10	7	13	30	42	37	14th ↓		
2016–17	Second League of FBiH – West	24	11	2	11	39	38	35	6th		
2017–18	Second League of FBiH – West	26	13	3	10	47	36	42	5th		
2018–19	Second League of FBiH – West	24	10	3	11	42	29	33	6th		
2019–20	Second League of FBiH – West	14	5	2	7	19	29	17	10th		
2020–21	Second League of FBiH – West I	16	6	3	7	19	25	21	5th		
