= FK Budućnost Banovići =

Budućnost Banovići
- Full name: Fudbalski klub Budućnost Banovići
- Founded: 1947; 79 years ago
- Ground: Stadion FK Budućnost
- Capacity: 8,500
- Chairman: Jasmin Hidić
- Manager: Mensur Dedić
- League: First League of FBiH
- 2025–26: First League of FBiH, 11th of 14
Home colours	Away colours

Fudbalski klub Budućnost Banovići is a professional football club from the town of Banovići that is situated in the eastern part of Bosnia and Herzegovina.

The club plays its home matches at the Gradski Stadion (City Stadium) in Banovići, also called Stadion FK Budućnost, which has a capacity of 8,500 seats. Their primary colors are dark green and black.

Today, Budućnost is a member of the Football Association of Bosnia and Herzegovina. The club is active in the First League of the Federation of Bosnia and Herzegovina, which is the second division of football in Bosnia and Herzegovina.

== Honours ==
=== Domestic ===
==== League ====
- First League of Bosnia and Herzegovina:
  - Runners-up (1): 1999–2000
- First League of the Federation of Bosnia and Herzegovina:
  - Winners (3): 1997–98 (north), 2003–04, 2009–10
  - Runners-up (2): 2001–02, 2011–12
- Second League of the Federation of Bosnia and Herzegovina:
  - Winners (2): 2017–18 (north), 2018–19 (north)

== European record ==
As of 24 August 2000

Competition	P	W	D	L	GF	GA	GD
UEFA Cup	2	0	0	2	0	4	–4
Total	2	0	0	2	0	4	–4

P = Matches played; W = Matches won; D = Matches drawn; L = Matches lost; GF = Goals for; GA = Goals against; GD = Goals difference. Defunct competitions indicated in italics.

=== List of matches ===
Season	Competition	Round		Club	Home	Away	Agg.
2000–01	UEFA Cup	QR	(Czech Republic)	Drnovice	0–1	0–3	0–4

== Club seasons ==
Season	League									Cup	Europe
Season	Division	P	W	D	L	F	A	Pts	Pos	Cup	Europe
1994–95	First League; Sarajevo Group	5	1	2	2	4	9	5	4th		
1997–98	Second League - North	26	16	8	2	56	9	56	1st ↑		
1998–99	First League	30	12	6	12	23	27	42	10th		
1999–2000	First League	30	15	8	7	38	21	53	5th	1/16	
1999–2000	First League; Play-offs	8	4	2	2	11	8	10	2nd		
Current format of Premier League of Bosnia and Herzegovina
2000–01	Premier League	42	17	7	18	68	63	58	16th ↓	1/16	
2001–02	First League of FBiH	28	17	3	8	64	25	54	2nd ↑	1/8	
2002–03	Premier League	38	10	8	20	48	67	38	19th ↓	1/16	
2003–04	First League of FBiH	30	17	8	5	39	17	59	1st ↑		
2004–05	Premier League	30	13	3	14	37	39	42	6th	1/16	
2005–06	Premier League	30	10	3	17	29	48	33	16th ↓	1/8	
2006–07	First League of FBiH	30	12	7	11	30	28	43	8th		
2007–08	First League of FBiH	30	13	5	12	39	30	44	5th	1/16	
2008–09	First League of FBiH	30	16	1	13	43	37	49	4th		
2009–10	First League of FBiH	30	22	2	6	57	19	68	1st ↑		
2010–11	Premier League	30	6	7	17	25	44	25	15th ↓	1/16	
2011–12	First League of FBiH	30	17	3	10	47	32	54	2nd		
2012–13	First League of FBiH	28	10	6	12	36	35	36	10th		
2013–14	First League of FBiH	30	12	3	15	42	39	39	14th		
2014–15	First League of FBiH	30	16	5	9	37	27	53	4th		
2015–16	First League of FBiH	30	14	4	12	34	27	46	7th		
2016–17	First League of FBiH	30	10	5	15	36	40	35	14th ↓		
2017–18	Second League of FBiH – North	30	17	10	3	53	18	61	1st		
2018–19	Second League of FBiH – North	30	19	5	6	53	21	62	1st ↑		
2019–20	First League of FBiH	16	5	5	6	26	22	20	11th	1/16	
2020–21	First League of FBiH	30	12	4	14	38	49	40	10th	1/16	
2021–22	First League of FBiH	30	14	10	6	48	34	52	3rd		
2022–23	First League of FBiH	30	14	8	8	41	37	50	3rd	1/16	
2023–24	First League of FBiH	30	11	6	13	36	42	39	9th		
2024–25	First League of FBiH	28	12	7	9	42	33	43	5th		
2025–26	First League of FBiH	26	8	7	11	31	33	31	11th		

== Managerial history ==
- (Bosnia and Herzegovina) Faruk Pašić
- (Bosnia and Herzegovina) Smajil Karić
- (Bosnia and Herzegovina) Fuad Grbešić (2004–2005)
- (Bosnia and Herzegovina) Munever Rizvić (30 June 2008 – 1 July 2011)
- (Bosnia and Herzegovina) Munever Rizvić (10 September 2012 – 9 January 2020)
- (Bosnia and Herzegovina) Igor Sliško (9 January 2020 – 15 October 2020)
- (Bosnia and Herzegovina) Smajil Karić (18 January 2021 – 26 July 2021)
- (Bosnia and Herzegovina) Milenko Bošnjaković (10 August 2021 – 22 August 2022)
- (Bosnia and Herzegovina) Denis Mujkić (26 August 2022 – 2 October 2023)
- (Bosnia and Herzegovina) Zehrudin Kavazović (8 October 2023 – 14 March 2024)
- (Bosnia and Herzegovina) Emir Ikanović (14 March 2024 – 26 June 2024)
- (Bosnia and Herzegovina) Milenko Bošnjaković (26 June 2024 – 8 September 2025)
- (Bosnia and Herzegovina) Elvis Čergić (10 September 2025 – 17 January 2026)
- (Bosnia and Herzegovina) Aldin Đidić (17 January 2026 – 17 August 2026)
- (Bosnia and Herzegovina) Mensur Dedić (19 August 2026 – present)
