= FK Krajina Cazin =

Krajina Cazin
- Full name: Fudbalski Klub Krajina Cazin
- Founded: 1932; 94 years ago
- Ground: Gradski Stadion; Cazin
- Capacity: 2,000
- Manager: Seadin Badić
- League: Second League of FBiH – West II
- 2020–21: 3rd
Home colours	Away colours

Fudbalski Klub Krajina Cazin (English: Krajina Cazin Football Club), commonly referred to as FK Krajina Cazin or simply Krajina Cazin, is a Bosnian football club based in Cazin. They currently play in the Second League of the Federation of Bosnia and Herzegovina (West), one of six divisions at the third tier, and in the Bosnian Cup. They last competed in the Bosnian Premier League in the 2000–01 season.

== History ==
FK Krajina Cazin was founded in 1932, and competed in the lower regional and amateur leagues in Yugoslavia until the independence of Bosnia and Hercegovina. From 1992 to 1997, the club joined the First League of Bosnia and Herzegovina - today known as Premier League of Bosnia and Herzegovina, which was the top league for clubs with a connection of Bosnian Federation. Again, in the 2000–2001 season, the club entered the Bosnian Premier League season, which also included clubs of Croat ethnicity. Due to large migration of population to Western Europe and USA, especially young talented athletes club suffered the loss of dozens of players.- Accordingly, Soccer Club Krajina performed poorly in this season, finishing second bottom with just three wins in 42 fixtures with 149 goals conceded. They also suffered the highest defeat, which was an 6–0 loss to Brotnjo Citluk.

In the 2000s (decade), the club has mainly competed in the First League of FBiH. This is one of two second tier divisions, for clubs of Croat and Bosniak ethnicity; Serbian clubs instead compete in the First League of the Republika Srpska. In both the 2006–07 and 2008–09 seasons, the club finished third bottom and were relegated to the Second League of FBiH – North, but in both case returned to the First League of FBiH the following season.

In recent seasons they have come close to gaining promotion to the Premier League for a second time. In the 2010–11 season, they finished the First League of FBiH campaign in third place, nine points behind champions NK GOŠK Gabela.

== Club seasons ==
Season	League									Cup	Europe
Season	Division	P	W	D	L	F	A	Pts	Pos	Cup	Europe
1997–98	Second League of Bosnia and Herzegovina - Central	22	17	4	1	55	8	55	2nd		
1998–99	Second League of Bosnia and Herzegovina	22	13	7	2	38	14	46	1st ↑		
1999–00	First League of Bosnia and Herzegovina	30	11	4	15	31	36	37	11th		
Current format of Premier League of Bosnia and Herzegovina
2000–01	Premier League of Bosnia and Herzegovina	42	3	5	34	23	149	14	21st ↓		
2001–02	First League of FBiH	28	12	2	14	35	51	37	12th ↓		
2003–04	Second League of FBiH – West	16	7	3	6	24	20	24	5th		
2006–07	First League of FBiH	30	11	5	14	27	32	38	14th ↓		
2007–08	Second League of FBiH – West								1st ↑		
2008–09	First League of FBiH	30	11	4	15	34	46	37	14th ↓		
2009–10	Second League of FBiH – West								1st ↑		
2010–11	First League of FBiH	30	14	5	11	41	31	47	3rd		
2011–12	First League of FBiH	30	14	8	8	39	28	50	5th		
2012–13	First League of FBiH	28	8	4	16	25	56	28	15th ↓		
2016–17	Second League of FBiH – West	24	14	5	5	39	23	47	3rd		
2017–18	Second League of FBiH – West	26	15	3	8	47	28	48	2nd		
2018–19	Second League of FBiH – West	24	11	5	8	31	25	38	5th		
2019–20	Second League of FBiH – West	14	8	2	4	38	19	26	5th		
2020–21	Second League of FBiH – West II	18	9	3	6	34	27	30	3rd		

== Players ==
=== Notable players ===
For a list of players with Wikipedia article, please see Category:FK Krajina Cazin players.

== Historical list of coaches ==
- (Bosnia and Herzegovina) Arif Ružnić (2007–2008)
- (Bosnia and Herzegovina) Izet Račić (2009–2011)
- (Bosnia and Herzegovina) Muhamed Berberović (2011–2012)
- (Bosnia and Herzegovina) Nurudin Nožić (2012 – February 2013)
- (Bosnia and Herzegovina) Arif Ružnić (February 2013 – 2014)
- (Bosnia and Herzegovina) Muhamed Berberović (2014–2017)
- (Bosnia and Herzegovina) Muhamed Berberović (2018–2019)
