= Bosnia and Herzegovina Football Cup =

Kup BiH
- Organiser(s): N/FSBiH
- Founded: 2000; 26 years ago
- Region: Bosnia and Herzegovina
- Teams: 32
- Qualifier for: UEFA Conference League
- Domestic cup: Bosnian Supercup
- Current champions: Zrinjski (4th title)
- Most championships: Sarajevo (8 titles)
- Broadcaster: Arena Sport
- Website: nfsbih.ba
- 2026–27 Cup

The Bosnia and Herzegovina Football Cup (Bosnian: Kup Bosne i Hercegovine; Croatian: Kup Bosne i Hercegovine; Serbian: Куп Босне и Херцеговине) is a knock-out football competition contested annually by clubs from Bosnia and Herzegovina. The winner qualifies for the UEFA Conference League second qualifying round and a place in the Bosnian Supercup.

Until the 1999–2000 season, three separate cups were organized. In 1998, for the first time, Bosnia and Herzegovina got its official cup winner after the "Super final" between Sarajevo and Orašje (winners of two different cups). In the 1999–2000 season, the normal cup format was organized for the first time in the Federation of Bosnia and Herzegovina. Since the 2000–01 season, clubs from the entire country have been competing in the Cup.

Prior to 1992, clubs from the Bosnia and Herzegovina territory contested in the Yugoslav Cup.

== Winners (1994–2000) ==
=== NS BiH Cup ===
Season	Winner	Score	Runner-up
1994–95	Čelik Zenica	1–0	Sloboda Tuzla
1995–96	Čelik Zenica	2–1	Sloboda Tuzla
1996–97	Sarajevo	2–0	Željezničar
1997–98	Sarajevo	1–0 a.e.t.	Sloboda Tuzla
1998–99	Bosna Visoko	1–0 a.e.t.	Sarajevo

=== Herzeg-Bosnia Cup ===
Season	Winner	Score	Runner-up
1994–95	Ljubuški	2–0	Sloga Uskoplje
1995–96	Ljubuški	1–1; 4–1 (pen.)	Široki Brijeg
1996–97	Troglav Livno	1–0	Orašje
1997–98	Orašje	0–0; 3–2 (pen.)	Široki Brijeg
1998–99	Brotnjo	1–1; 4–2 (pen.)	Široki Brijeg
1999–00	Orašje	0–2, 7–2; Agg. 7–4	Kiseljak

=== Republika Srpska Cup ===
Season	Winner	Score	Runner-up
1993–94	Kozara Gradiška	0–0; 7–6 (pen.)	Sloga Doboj
1994–95	Borac	3–2, 2–2; Agg. 5–4	Rudar Prijedor
1995–96	Borac	1–0, 1–2; Agg. 2–2 (a)	Jedinstvo Brčko
1996–97	Sloga Trn	1–0	Sarajevo Pale
1997–98	Rudar Ugljevik	0–0; 4–2 (pen.)	Boksit Milići
1998–99	Rudar Ugljevik	0–0; 4–3 (pen.)	Sloga Trn
1999–00	Kozara Gradiška	1–0	Sloboda Novi Grad

== Football Cup finals of Bosnia and Herzegovina ==
Season	Winner	Score	Runners-up
1997–98	Sarajevo (2)	0–0, 1–0; Agg. 1–0	Orašje
1999–2000*	Group of three, Željezničar (1) won		
2000–01	Željezničar (2)	3–2	Sarajevo
2001–02	Sarajevo (3)	2–1	Željezničar
2002–03	Željezničar (3)	0–0, 2–0; Agg. 2–0	Leotar
2003–04	Modriča (1)	1–1; 4–2 (pen.)	Borac
2004–05	Sarajevo (4)	1–0, 1–1; Agg. 2–1	Široki Brijeg
2005–06	Orašje (1)	0–0, 3–0; Agg. 3–0	Široki Brijeg
2006–07	Široki Brijeg (1)	1–1, 1–0; Agg. 2–1	Slavija
2007–08	Zrinjski (1)	1–2, 2–1; Agg. 3–3; 3–1 (pen.)	Sloboda
2008–09	Slavija (1)	0–2, 2–0; Agg. 2–2; 4–3 (pen.)	Sloboda
2009–10	Borac (1)	1–1, 2–2; Agg. 3–3 (a)	Željezničar
2010–11	Željezničar (4)	1–0, 3–0; Agg. 4–0	Čelik
2011–12	Željezničar (5)	1–0, 0–0; Agg. 1–0	Široki Brijeg
2012–13	Široki Brijeg (2)	1–1, 1–1; Agg. 2–2; 5–4 (pen.)	Željezničar
2013–14	Sarajevo (5)	2–0, 3–1; Agg. 5–1	Čelik
2014–15	Olimpik (1)	1–1, 1–1; Agg. 2–2; 5–4 (pen.)	Široki Brijeg
2015–16	Radnik (1)	1–1, 3–0; Agg. 4–1	Sloboda
2016–17	Široki Brijeg (3)	1–0, 0–1; Agg. 1–1; 4–2 (pen.)	Sarajevo
2017–18	Željezničar (6)	2–0, 4–0; Agg. 6–0	Krupa
2018–19	Sarajevo (6)	3–0, 0–1; Agg. 3–1	Široki Brijeg
2019–20	Abandoned due to COVID-19 pandemic in Bosnia and Herzegovina		
2020–21	Sarajevo (7)	0–0; 4–1 (pen.)	Borac
2021–22	Velež Mostar (1)	0–0; 4–3 (pen.)	Sarajevo
2022–23	Zrinjski (2)	1–0	Velež Mostar
2023–24	Zrinjski (3)	1–0, 1–0; Agg. 2–0	Borac
2024–25	Sarajevo (8)	4–0, 1–1; Agg. 5–1	Široki Brijeg
2025–26	Zrinjski (4)	1–0, 1–1; Agg. 2–1	Velež Mostar

- In 2000, Željezničar won the final tournament with Sloboda being 1st runner-up and Bosna being 2nd runner-up.

As mentioned above, before 1998, and in 1999, three different cups were played. They were organized on ethnic principles, so every region had its own cup winner.

== Performance by club ==
Club	Winners	Runners-up	Winning years	Runners-up years
Sarajevo	8	4	1997, 1998, 2002, 2005, 2014, 2019, 2021, 2025	1999, 2001, 2017, 2022
Željezničar	6	4	2000, 2001, 2003, 2011, 2012, 2018	1997, 2002, 2010, 2013
Zrinjski	4	–	2008, 2023, 2024, 2026	–
Široki Brijeg	3	6	2007, 2013, 2017	2005, 2006, 2012, 2015, 2019, 2025
Čelik	2	2	1995, 1996	2011, 2014
Borac	1	3	2010	2004, 2021, 2024
Velež	1	2	2022	2023, 2026
Slavija	1	1	2009	2007
Orašje	1	1	2006	1998
Bosna	1	1	1999	2000
Radnik	1	–	2016	–
Olimpik	1	–	2015	–
Modriča	1	–	2004	–
Sloboda	–	6	–	1995, 1996, 2000, 2008, 2009, 2016
Krupa	–	1	–	2018
Leotar	–	1	–	2003
