= First League of Herzeg-Bosnia =

National football league

The First League of Herzeg-Bosnia (Croatian: Prva liga Herceg-Bosne) served as the top football league in Croatian Republic of Herzeg-Bosnia during the Bosnian War and post-war periods of the 1990s. During these years, football was divided along ethnic lines, with the Croat, Bosniak and Serb populations each running their own league. Because Bosniaks were the only group interested in a distinctly Bosnian-Herzegovinian league and national team, only their league was recognized by the Football Association of Bosnia and Herzegovina.

The league formed in 1993. In the 1997/1998 season, the top Croat teams began facing the top Bosniak teams for entrance to UEFA tournaments, something that had been denied the Herzeg-Bosnia league on its own. This setup lasted until the 2000/2001 season when the two leagues merged to form the Premier League of Bosnia and Herzegovina.

== First League Champions ==
- 1993–94 - Mladost-Dubint Široki Brijeg – Mario Prskalo (10 goals, Mladost-Dubint Široki Brijeg)
- 1994–95 - Mladost-Dubint Široki Brijeg – Anđelko Marušić (15, Mladost-Dubint Široki Brijeg)
- 1995–96 - Mladost Široki Brijeg – Mario Marušić (15, Grude), Dejan Džepina (15, Novi Travnik)
- 1996–97 - Široki Brijeg – Anđelko Marušić (21, Široki Brijeg)
- 1997–98 - Široki Brijeg – Stanko Bubalo (31, Široki Brijeg)
- 1998–99 - Posušje – Slađan Filipović (19, Široki Brijeg)
- 1999–2000 - Posušje – Robert Ristovski (18, Kiseljak)

== Herzeg-Bosnia Cup ==
- 1994–95 - Ljubuški
- 1995–96 - Ljubuški
- 1996–97 - Troglav Livno
- 1997–98 - Orašje
- 1998–99 - Brotnjo
- 1999–2000 - Orašje
