= NK Travnik =

Travnik
- Full name: Nogometni Klub Travnik
- Nickname: Veziri (Vizier)
- Founded: 1922; 104 years ago
- Ground: Stadion Pirota
- Capacity: 3,076
- President: Asim Fazlić
- Manager: Nihad Ribić
- League: First League of FBiH
- 2025–26: First League of FBiH, 6th of 14
Home colours	Away colours

NK Travnik (Bosnian: Nogometni Klub Travnik), commonly known as Travnik is a professional association football club from the city of Travnik that is situated in Bosnia and Herzegovina.

Currently, Travnik plays in the First League of the Federation of Bosnia and Herzegovina and plays its home matches on Stadion Pirota which has a capacity of 3,076 seats.

== History ==
=== Early period ===
NK Travnik was founded in 1922. The club is not really known for its period during the former Yugoslavia, as its mostly known since the end of the Bosnian War and since the mid-1990s.

=== Post-Yugoslav period ===
The club played in the First League of Bosnia and Herzegovina from 1995 to 1998, finishing 11th in the 1995–96 season, 14th in the 1996–97 and then getting eliminated in the 1997–98 after finishing on 15th place.

After winning the Second League of BiH in the 1999–2000 season, Travnik got promoted to the first 2000–01 Bosnian Premier League season, but got relegated after only one year of playing top league football. The club played two years in the First League of FBiH, before once again getting promoted in the 2002–03 season. The 2005–06 season got saw Travnik get relegated from the Premier League for the second time, but it got promoted the next year in the 2006–07 First League of FBiH season.

=== Present years ===
Travnik were promoted in the 2006–07 season in the Premier League remaining there for 9 consecutive seasons while finishing almost every season in the lower part of the league table. It was relegated for its third time in the 2015–16 season, and has been relegated from the First League of FBiH in the 2017–18 season.

Travnik was not promoted right away from the Second League of FBiH (West division) to the First League in the 2018–19 season, and currently plays in the already mentioned second tier Bosnia and Herzegovina football league system.

== Honours ==
=== Domestic ===
==== League ====
- First League of the Federation of Bosnia and Herzegovina:
  - Winners (3): 1999–2000, 2002–03, 2006–07
- Second League of the Federation of Bosnia and Herzegovina:
  - Winners (2): 2018–19 (west), 2023–24 (west)
