= HNK Brotnjo =

- Full name: Hrvatski Nogometni Klub Brotnjo Čitluk
- Founded: 1955; 70 years ago
- Ground: Bare Stadium, Čitluk
- Capacity: 8,000
- Chairman: Zoran Bubalo
- Manager: Tihomir Miloš
- League: Second League of FBiH
- 2020–21: 10th
Home colours	Away colours

HNK Brotnjo (Croatian: Hrvatski nogometni klub Brotnjo-Čitluk, lit. 'Croatian Football Club Brotnjo-Čitluk') is a football club based in Čitluk, Bosnia and Herzegovina. The club plays in Second League of the Federation of Bosnia and Herzegovina. Brotnjo plays out of Bare Stadium, which has a capacity of 8,000.

The biggest success came in 2000, when they won the Bosnian-Herzegovinian play-off competition. That's the club's only championship title which secured them presence in the Champions League first qualifying round. Club lost first match 4:0 against Fbk Kaunas. In second game Brotnjo won 3:0. A year later, they also played in UEFA Cup qualifying round.

== Logos ==
The club's crest features the Coat of Arms of Croatia. The name 'Brotnjo' comes from the historical name of the region of Čitluk.

Old logo

Present logo

== European record ==
Season	Competition	Round		Club	Home	Away
2000–01	UEFA Champions League	1Q	(Lithuania)	FBK Kaunas	3–0	0–4
2001–02	UEFA Cup	QR	(Norway)	Viking FK	1–1	0–1
2002	UEFA Intertoto Cup	1R	(Switzerland)	FC Zürich	2–1	0–7

== Club seasons ==
Season	League									Cup	Europe
Season	Division	P	W	D	L	F	A	Pts	Pos	Cup	Europe
1997–98	First League of Herzeg-Bosnia	30	16	8	6	64	29	56	4th	Final	
1998–99	First League of Herzeg-Bosnia	26	14	5	7	53	26	47	4th		
1999–00	First League of Bosnia and Herzegovina	26	18	3	5	63	21	57	1st		
Current format of Premier League of Bosnia and Herzegovina
2000–01	Premier League of Bosnia and Herzegovina	42	26	6	10	83	25	84	2nd		
2001–02	Premier League of Bosnia and Herzegovina	30	14	5	11	45	27	47	3rd		
2002–03	Premier League of Bosnia and Herzegovina	38	15	7	16	47	55	52	13th		
2003–04	Premier League of Bosnia and Herzegovina	30	4	7	19	29	59	19	16th ↓		
2004–05	First League of FBiH	30	11	5	14	36	49	38	12th		
2005–06	First League of FBiH	30	15	3	12	58	33	48	3rd		
2006–07	First League of FBiH	30	13	2	15	35	43	41	11th		
2007–08	First League of FBiH	30	8	2	19	31	62	26	16th ↓		
2008–09											
2009–10											
2010–11											
2011–12											
2012–13											
2013–14											
2014–15											
2015–16											
2016–17	Second League of FBiH – South	28	9	2	17	36	55	26	13th		
2017–18	Second League of FBiH – South	28	15	3	10	59	30	48	4th		
2018–19	Second League of FBiH – South	26	11	7	8	37	42	40	6th		
2019–20	Second League of FBiH – South	14	4	2	8	17	25	14	11th		
2020–21	Second League of FBiH – South	24	5	6	13	26	44	21	10th		

== Honours ==
=== Domestic ===
==== League ====
- First League / Premier League of Bosnia and Herzegovina:
  - Winners (1): 1999–2000
  - Runners-up (1): 2000–01

==== Cups ====
- Supercup of Bosnia and Herzegovina:
  - Runners-up (1): 2000
- Herzeg-Bosnia Cup:
  - Winners (1): 1998–99

== Notable players ==
For the list of former and current players with Wikipedia article, please see Category:HNK Brotnjo players.
Had senior international caps for their respective countries. Players whose name is listed in bold represented their countries while playing for Brotnjo.

- (Bosnia and Herzegovina) Dragan Blatnjak
- (Bosnia and Herzegovina) Mateo Sušić
- (Bosnia and Herzegovina) **Enes Mešanović**
- (Bosnia and Herzegovina) **Dalibor Šilić**
- (North Macedonia) Igor Jančevski
- (Bosnia and Herzegovina) Zajko Zeba
- (Bosnia and Herzegovina) **Miro Klaić**
- (Bosnia and Herzegovina) Miro Katić
- (Bosnia and Herzegovina) **Danijel Krivić**
- (Bosnia and Herzegovina) (Croatia) **Mario Ivanković**
- (Bosnia and Herzegovina) **Nikola Juričić**
- (Bosnia and Herzegovina) **Darko Cvijanović**
- (Bosnia and Herzegovina) **Nenad Džidić**
- (Bosnia and Herzegovina) **Jovan "Jovo" Sikima**
- (Bosnia and Herzegovina) **Robert Miloš**
- (Bosnia and Herzegovina) **Miroslav Lauš**
- (Bosnia and Herzegovina) **Danijel Bajkuša**
- (Bosnia and Herzegovina) **Zoran Prusina**

== Historical list of coaches ==
- (Socialist Federal Republic of Yugoslavia) (Bosnia and Herzegovina) Srećko Lušić
- (Bosnia and Herzegovina) Blaž Slišković (1999–2000)
- (Bosnia and Herzegovina) Ivo Ištuk (2000–2001)
- (Croatia) Marijo Tot (2003–2004)
- (Bosnia and Herzegovina) Ratko Ninković (2006–2007)
- (Bosnia and Herzegovina) Davor Juričić-Šojka (2009–2010)
- (Bosnia and Herzegovina) Romeo Šapina (2014–2017)
- (Bosnia and Herzegovina) Nikola Juričić (2016–2018)
- (Bosnia and Herzegovina) Davor Juričić-Šojka (2018-)
