= NK SAŠK Napredak =

SAŠK Napredak
- Full name: Nogometni Klub Sarajevski amaterski športski klub Napredak
- Founded: 2000 (Merge); SAŠK (1910, 1999); NK Napredak (1994)
- Ground: Stadion Doglodi
- Capacity: 400
- Chairman: Gabrijel Vukadin
- Manager: Amir Beća
- League: Druga Liga FBiH
- 2017–18: Kantonalna liga Sarajevo, 1st (promoted)
Home colours	Away colours

NK SAŠK Napredak is a football club from Sarajevo, Bosnia and Herzegovina. It came into existence in 2000 through the merger of SAŠK with NK Napredak.

== SAŠK ==
SAŠK's history traces back to 1910 when it was founded as Hrvatski ŠK. In 1919 it was renamed to Sarajevski amaterski športski klub (Sarajevo Amateur Sports Club) or SAŠK. Along with FK Slavija, it is the club from Bosnia with most participations in the Yugoslav First League in the period before the star of Second World War. Its coaches in this period were Gal, Bevanda, Giljaković, Kražić, Ferigec, Koželuh and Ivan Kezić.

After World War II ended, SAŠK was banned by the authorities of Communist Yugoslavia because of its participation in the Croatian First League during the war in what was then Axis-allied Croatia. SAŠK was re-founded in 1999.

== Napredak ==
NK Napredak was formed in 1994 by the Croat cultural society of the same name.

== Merge ==
Two teams merged in 2000 to form the current club.

Since the 2000–01 season, the club has been in the First League of the Federation of Bosnia and Herzegovina.

The club is part of HKD Napredak (Croatian Cultural Society 'Progress'). It organizes a futsal tournament around Christmas every year.
