= NK Ljubuški =

- Full name: Nogometni klub Ljubuški
- Nickname(s): Najveći
- Founded: 2005
- Ground: Babovac Stadium
- Capacity: 4,000
- Chairman: Miljenko Dropulić
- Manager: Damir Vučić
- League: Second League of the Federation of Bosnia and Herzegovina
Home colours	Away colours

NK Ljubuški (Croatian: Nogometni klub Ljubuški, lit. Football Club Ljubuški) is a football club from Ljubuški, Bosnia and Herzegovina. The team plays in the third tier Second League of the Federation of Bosnia and Herzegovina (South), and plays its games at Babovac Stadium.

== History ==
The club was founded in 2005 under the name NK Bigeste, named after the Roman camp near Ljubuški. In 2019 the club changed its name to NK Ljubuški

== Honours ==
- Međužupanijska liga ZHŽ i HBŽ: 1

2010, 2009

- Second League of the Federation of Bosnia and Herzegovina (South): ?

2011, 2012
