= 2014–15 HŠK Zrinjski Mostar season =

Zrinjski Mostar
2014–15 season
- Chairman: Marin Raspudić
- Manager: Branko Karačić (until 27 December 2014); Mišo Krstičević (from 3 January 2015)
- Premier League of BiH: 3rd
- Cup of BiH: 1/2 final
- UEFA Champions League: Second qualifying round
- Highest home attendance: 5,000 v Široki Brijeg, 22 November 2014
- Lowest home attendance: 200 v Sloga Ljubuški, 22 October 2014
Home colours	Away colours

The 2014–15 season was Zrinjski Mostar’s the 23rd season after reforming and their 15th in the Premier League of BiH.

== First-team squad ==
As of 27 December 2014

Note: Flags indicate national team as defined under FIFA eligibility rules; some limited exceptions apply. Players may hold more than one non-FIFA nationality.

No.	Pos.	Nation	Player
1	GK	(Bosnia and Herzegovina) BIH	Ratko Dujković
3	MF	(Bosnia and Herzegovina) BIH	Aleksandar Radulović
5	DF	(Bosnia and Herzegovina) BIH	Daniel Graovac
6	DF	(Bosnia and Herzegovina) BIH	Anto Radeljić
7	MF	(Croatia) CRO	Deni Simeunović
8	MF	(Bosnia and Herzegovina) BIH	Milan Muminović
9	FW	(Bosnia and Herzegovina) BIH	Krešimir Kordić
10	MF	(Bosnia and Herzegovina) BIH	Ivan Crnov
11	MF	(Bosnia and Herzegovina) BIH	Mile Pehar
12	GK	(Bosnia and Herzegovina) BIH	Ivan Tirić
13	MF	(Serbia) SRB	Vučina Šćepanović
14	MF	(Bosnia and Herzegovina) BIH	Josip Jozić
15	DF	(Croatia) CRO	Zvonimir Blaić
16	DF	(Bosnia and Herzegovina) BIH	Pero Stojkić
17	MF	(Bosnia and Herzegovina) BIH	Ognjen Todorović

No.	Pos.	Nation	Player
18	DF	(Bosnia and Herzegovina) BIH	Ivo Zlatić
19	MF	(Bosnia and Herzegovina) BIH	Marin Galić
20	MF	(Croatia) CRO	Danijel Stojanović
21	DF	(Bosnia and Herzegovina) BIH	Zoran Brković
23	MF	(Bosnia and Herzegovina) BIH	Dženan Durak
24	FW	(Bosnia and Herzegovina) BIH	Stevo Nikolić
25	MF	(Croatia) CRO	Oliver Petrak
27	MF	(Bosnia and Herzegovina) BIH	Pavle Sušić
32	DF	(Croatia) CRO	Matija Katanec
55	MF	(Bosnia and Herzegovina) BIH	Velibor Đurić

== Friendlies ==
24 January 2015	Zrinjski Mostar	2–0	(Croatia) NK Zadar	Međugorje
	Todorović 21'; Stojanović 75'

1 February 2015 2015 Istria Winter Cup	Zrinjski Mostar	3–2	(Croatia) NK Novigrad	Novigrad, Croatia
	Todorović 21'; Stojanović 75'

6 February 2015 2015 Istria Winter Cup	Zrinjski Mostar	0–1	(Romania) CFR Cluj	Novigrad, Croatia

8 February 2015 2015 Istria Winter Cup	Zrinjski Mostar	0–0 (penalties)	(Slovenia) Zavrč	Novigrad, Croatia

15 February 2015	Zrinjski Mostar	6–0	Igman	Međugorje

18 February 2015	Zrinjski Mostar	2–0	GOŠK	Međugorje
				Attendance: 250

== Competitions ==
=== Overall ===
Competition	Started round	Final result	First match	Last Match
2014–15 Premier League of BiH	–	3rd	2 August	30 May
2014–15 Cup of BiH	1/8 final	1/2 final	17 September	29 April
2014–15 UEFA Champions League	QR2	QR2	15 July	23 July

=== Premier League of BiH ===
==== League table ====
Pos	Team	Pld	W	D	L	GF	GA	GD	Pts	Qualification or relegation
1	Sarajevo (C)	30	19	9	2	55	17	+38	66	Qualification to Champions League second qualifying round
2	Željezničar	30	18	9	3	52	22	+30	63	Qualification to Europa League first qualifying round
3	Zrinjski	30	16	11	3	41	13	+28	59	Qualification to Europa League first qualifying round
4	Široki Brijeg	30	15	11	4	46	23	+23	56	
5	Borac Banja Luka	30	14	7	9	26	26	0	49	

Source: uefa.com
Rules for classification: 1) points; 2) goal difference; 3) number of goals scored
(C) Champions

==== Results summary ====
Overall								Home						Away					
Pld	W	D	L	GF	GA	GD	Pts	W	D	L	GF	GA	GD	W	D	L	GF	GA	GD
30	16	11	3	41	13	+28	59	9	6	0	25	4	+21	7	5	3	16	9	+7

Last updated: 30 May 2015.

==== Results by round ====
Round	1	2	3	4	5	6	7	8	9	10	11	12	13	14	15	16	17	18	19	20	21	22	23	24	25	26	27	28	29	30
Ground	A	A	H	A	H	A	H	A	H	A	H	A	H	A	H	H	H	A	H	A	H	A	H	A	H	A	H	A	H	A
Result	D	W	W	W	W	L	W	L	W	W	D	W	D	W	D	W	D	D	D	W	W	W	W	D	D	L	W	D	W	D
Position	8	6	2	1	1	2	2	3	3	2	2	2	2	2	3	3	3	4	4	3	3	2	2	2	4	4	3	3	3	3

Source: Competitive matches
A = Away; H = Home; W = Win; D = Draw; L = Loss

==== Matches ====
Win Draw Loss Postponed

2 August 2014 1	Slavija	0–0	Zrinjski Mostar	Istočno Sarajevo
18:00 CET	Prodanović (yellow card) 25'; Govedarica (yellow card) 28'; Vejnović (yellow card) 40'; Lemez (yellow card) 53'; Radosavljević (yellow card) 79'; Šabanović (yellow card) 90'		(yellow card) 47' Simeunović; (yellow card) 51' Šćepanović	Stadium: Gradski SRC Slavija; Attendance: 500; Referee: I. Peljto

9 August 2014 2	Drina Zvornik	1–2	Zrinjski Mostar	Zvornik
17:30 CET	Lazarević (yellow card) 28'; Radović (yellow card) 53'; Ivanović 89'		37' Pehar; (yellow card) 69' Šćepanović; 85' Nikolić	Stadium: Gradski stadion Attendance: 700; Referee: H. Terzić

16 August 2014 3	Zrinjski Mostar	2–0	Radnik	Mostar
19:00 CET	Simeunović 49'; Crnov 90'		(yellow card) 47' Ćosović; (yellow card) 79' Hasanović; (yellow card) 89' Memišević	Stadium: Stadion pod Bijelim Brijegom; Attendance: 1,000; Referee: M. Bureković

23 August 2014 4	Željezničar	0–2	Zrinjski Mostar	Sarajevo
21:00 CET	Kosorić (yellow card) 46'; Stanić (yellow card) 49'; Memija (yellow card) 60'; Bučan (yellow card) 79'; Baša (yellow card) 83'		(yellow card) 16' Katanec; (yellow card) 32' (goal) 56' Nikolić; (yellow card) 55' Simeunović; 68' Crnov	Stadium: Stadion Grbavica; Attendance: 2,000; Referee: E. Jakupović

27 August 2014 5	Zrinjski Mostar	2–0	Vitez	Mostar
19:00 CET	Radulović 12'; Radeljić (yellow card) 53'; Đurić 68'; Blaić (yellow card) 75'		(yellow card) 42' Livaja; (yellow card) 60' Petrović; (yellow card) 81' Hrkać	Stadium: Stadion pod Bijelim Brijegom; Attendance: 1,200; Referee: A. Mulahasanović

30 August 2014 6	Sloboda Tuzla	1–0	Zrinjski Mostar	Tuzla
16:30 CET	Bajraktarević (yellow card) 26'; Radovanović 34'; Mujkić (yellow card) 51'; Janković (yellow card) 67'; Mujić (yellow card) 77'; Šećerović (yellow card) 90'		(yellow card) 90' Kordić	Stadium: Stadion Tušanj; Attendance: 1,500; Referee: D. Petrović

13 September 2014 7	Zrinjski Mostar	3–0	Zvijezda	Mostar
18:00 CET	Nikolić 36'; Crnov 55'; Stojkić 58'		(yellow card) 25' Bjelić; (yellow card) 35' Brkić; (yellow card) 47' Puljić; (yellow card) 90' Diatta	Stadium: Stadion pod Bijelim Brijegom; Attendance: 1,500; Referee: Z. Grbić

21 September 2014 8	Borac Banja Luka	1–0	Zrinjski Mostar	Banja Luka
19:00 CET	Žižović (yellow card) 45'; Grujić (yellow card) 45'; Subić 46'; Stokić (yellow card) 67'		(yellow card) 83' Radulović; (yellow card) 90' Radeljić	Stadium: Gradski stadion Attendance: 3,500; Referee: V. Bjelica

27 September 2014 9	Zrinjski Mostar	2–0	Velež	Mostar
17:00 CET	Muminović (yellow card) 24'; Crnov 34'; Nikolić 48'; Stojkić (yellow card) 74'; Stojanović (yellow card) 75'		(yellow card) 42' M. Nikolić; (yellow card) 68' Hajdarović; (yellow card) 72' Vladavić; (yellow card) 79' Pejić	Stadium: Stadion pod Bijelim Brijegom; Attendance: 4,000; Referee: D. Petrović

5 October 2014 10	Mladost Velika Obarska	0–2	Zrinjski Mostar	Velika Obarska
15:30 CET	Marković (yellow card) 26'; Vuković (yellow card) 82'		25' (Pen.) 85' Nikolić; (yellow card) 29' Muminović; (yellow card) 90' Pehar	Stadium: Gradski stadion Attendance: 300; Referee: M. Bureković

18 October 2014 11	Zrinjski Mostar	1–1	Sarajevo	Mostar
16:00 CET	Šćepanović (yellow card) 28'; Crnov 37'; Muminović (yellow card) 57'; Graovac (yellow card) 90'		(yellow card) 31' Barić; 55' Okić; (yellow card) 89' Tatomirović	Stadium: Stadion pod Bijelim Brijegom; Attendance: 4,500; Referee: E. Jakupović

25 October 2014 12	Travnik	1–3	Zrinjski Mostar	Travnik
14:30 CET	Varupa (yellow card) 18'; Sadiković (yellow card) 26'; Smajić 90'		(yellow card) 31' Blaić; (yellow card) 38' Katanec; 40' Nikolić; 49' (yellow card) 78' Simeunović; 59' Crnov	Stadium: Stadion Pirota; Attendance: 800; Referee: G. Paradžik

1 November 2014 13	Zrinjski Mostar	1–1	Čelik	Mostar
16:30 CET	Muminović (red card) 42'; Đurić (yellow card) 42'; Blaić (yellow card) 42'; Stojkić (yellow card) 45'; Nikolić 58'; Stojanović (yellow card) 86'		(yellow card) 49' Kavazović; (yellow card) 57' Kazazić; 89' (yellow card) 89' Popović; (yellow card) 90' Kojić; (yellow card) 90' Bureković; (yellow card) 90' Radulović	Stadium: Stadion pod Bijelim Brijegom; Attendance: 2,000; Referee: V. Bjelica

9 November 2014 14	Olimpic	0–1	Zrinjski Mostar	Sarajevo
13:00 CET	Bogičević (yellow card) 36'; Muharemović (yellow card) 41'; Regoje (yellow card) 84'		(yellow card) 33' Radulović; 79' Petrak; (yellow card) 81' Dujković	Stadium: Stadion Otoka; Attendance: 1,000; Referee: I. Živković

22 November 2014 15	Zrinjski Mostar	0–0	Široki Brijeg	Mostar
13:00 CET	Graovac (yellow card) 39'; Crnov (yellow card) 60'		(yellow card) 13' Pandža; (yellow card) 37' Kožulj; (yellow card) 65' Buhač; (yellow card) 83' Zakarić	Stadium: Stadion pod Bijelim Brijegom; Attendance: 5,000; Referee: M. Bureković

28 February 2015 16	Zrinjski Mostar	2–0	Slavija	Mostar
14:30 CET		Report		Stadium: Stadion pod Bijelim Brijegom; Attendance: 1,500; Referee: E. Mujić

15 March 2015 17	Zrinjski Mostar	1–1	Drina Zvornik	Mostar
CET				Stadium: Stadion pod Bijelim Brijegom

22 March 2015 18	Radnik	0–0	Zrinjski Mostar	Bijeljina
CET				Stadium: Gradski stadion

4 April 2015 19	Zrinjski Mostar	1–1	Željezničar	Mostar
CET				Stadium: Stadion pod Bijelim Brijegom

8 April 2015 20	Vitez	0–1	Zrinjski Mostar	Vitez
CET				Stadium: Gradski stadion

11 April 2015 21	Zrinjski Mostar	1–0	Sloboda Tuzla	Mostar
CET				Stadium: Stadion pod Bijelim Brijegom

18 April 2015 22	Zvijezda	2–3	Zrinjski Mostar	Gradačac
CET				Stadium: Banja Ilidža

22 April 2015 23	Zrinjski Mostar	2–0	Borac Banja Luka	Mostar
CET				Stadium: Stadion pod Bijelim Brijegom

26 April 2015 24	Velež	1–1	Zrinjski Mostar	Mostar
CET				Stadium: Stadion Vrapčići

3 May 2015 25	Zrinjski Mostar	0–0	Mladost Velika Obarska	Mostar
CET				Stadium: Stadion pod Bijelim Brijegom

9 May 2015 26	Sarajevo	1–0	Zrinjski Mostar	Sarajevo
CET				Stadium: Stadion Koševo

13 May 2015 27	Zrinjski Mostar	5–0	Travnik	Mostar
CET				Stadium: Stadion pod Bijelim Brijegom

16 May 2015 28	Čelik	0–0	Zrinjski Mostar	Zenica
CET				Stadium: Stadion Bilino Polje

23 May 2015 29	Zrinjski Mostar	2–0	Olimpic	Mostar
CET				Stadium: Stadion pod Bijelim Brijegom

30 May 2015 30	Široki Brijeg	1–1	Zrinjski Mostar	Široki Brijeg
CET				Stadium: Stadion Pecara

=== Cup of BiH ===
17 September 2014 1/16 final	Zrinjski Mostar	3–1	Napredak Donji Šepak	Mostar
16:00 CET	Muminović (yellow card) 49'; Radeljić (yellow card) 60'; Crnov 67'; Kordić 77' 81'		18' (yellow card) 68' Jovanović	Stadium: Stadion pod Bijelim Brijegom; Attendance: 300; Referee: H. Kaljanac

30 September 2014 1/8 final 1st leg	Sloga Ljubuški	2–3	Zrinjski Mostar	Ljubuški
15:30 CET	Serdarević 59'; Gil Badillo 67'		(yellow card) 30' Petrak; 49' Pehar; 63' Katanec; (yellow card) 85' Radeljić; (yellow card) 86' Đurić; 90' Muminović	Stadium: Stadion Babovac; Attendance: 1,200; Referee: M. Tičić

22 October 2014 1/8 final 2nd leg	Zrinjski Mostar	4–1 (7–3 agg.)	Sloga Ljubuški	Mostar
15:00 CET	Radeljić 43' 54' 64' (yellow card) 66'; Galić (yellow card) 79'; Kordić 86'		(yellow card) 32' Serdarević; (yellow card) 52' Prce; 77' Jelčić	Stadium: Stadion pod Bijelim Brijegom; Attendance: 200; Referee: S. Silić

11 March 2015 1/4 final 1st leg	Zrinjski Mostar	2–2	Velež	Mostar
CET				Stadium: Stadion pod Bijelim Brijegom

18 March 2015 1/4 final 2nd leg	Velež	0–2 (2–4 agg.)	Zrinjski Mostar	Mostar
CET				Stadium: Stadion Vrapčići

15 April 2015 1/2 final 1st leg	Olimpic	0–0	Zrinjski Mostar	Sarajevo
16:30 CET				Stadium: Stadion Otoka; Attendance: 500; Referee: Dragan Skakić

29 April 2015 1/2 final 2nd leg	Zrinjski Mostar	0–0 (0–0 agg.) (4–5 p)	Olimpic	Mostar
18:00 CET				Stadium: Stadion pod Bijelim Brijegom; Attendance: 3,000; Referee: Edin Jakupović
	Penalties
	Stojkić (penalty missed); Đurić (penalty scored); Šćepanović (penalty scored); Radulović (penalty scored); Crnov (penalty scored); Pehar (penalty missed)		(penalty scored) Bogičević; (penalty scored) Pereira; (penalty scored) Merajić; (penalty scored) Handžić; (penalty missed) Muharemović; (penalty scored) Jusufović

=== UEFA Champions League ===
==== Second qualifying round ====
15 July 2014 1st leg	Zrinjski Mostar (Bosnia and Herzegovina)	0–0	(Slovenia) Maribor	Mostar, Bosnia and Herzegovina
19:30 CET		Report		Stadium: Stadion pod Bijelim Brijegom; Attendance: 5,100; Referee: Carlos del Cerro Grande (Spain)

23 July 2014 2nd leg	Maribor (Slovenia)	2–0 (2–0 agg.)	(Bosnia and Herzegovina) Zrinjski Mostar	Maribor, Slovenia
20:00 CET	Mendy (yellow card) 30'; Vršič 45'; Ibraimi 57' (Pen.); Šuler (yellow card) 62'	Report	Stojkić (yellow card) 50'; Dujković (yellow card) 56'; Šćepanović (yellow card) 56'	Stadium: Ljudski vrt Attendance: 7,500; Referee: Sergey Lapochkin (Russia)

== Transfers ==
=== In ===
Date	Position	Player	From	Fee
1 Jul 2014	DF	(Croatia) Zvonimir Blaić	(Bosnia and Herzegovina) Široki Brijeg	Free transfer
1 Jan 2015	MF	(Croatia) Sven Dedić	(Croatia) Lučko	Undisclosed
28 Jan 2015	DF	(Slovenia) Nejc Mevlja	(Romania) Pandurii	Free transfer
2 Feb 2015	MF	(Bosnia and Herzegovina) Ognjen Todorović	(Bosnia and Herzegovina) Sarajevo	Free transfer
9 Feb 2015	MF	(Bosnia and Herzegovina) Miloš Aćimović	(Bosnia and Herzegovina) Leotar	€25,000
9 Feb 2015	MF	(Bosnia and Herzegovina) Dejan Vukomanović	(Armenia) Gandzasar	Undisclosed

=== Out ===
Date	Position	Player	From	Fee
20 Jan 2015	DF	(Croatia) Matija Katanec	(Italy) Spezia Calcio	€200,000
