= Velibor Đurić =

Bosnian football manager (born 1982)

Personal information
- Date of birth: 5 May 1982 (age 44)
- Place of birth: Vlasenica, SFR Yugoslavia
- Height: 1.74 m (5 ft 9 in)
- Position: Attacking midfielder

Team information
- Current team: Leotar (manager)

Youth career
- –2003: Slavija Sarajevo

Senior career*
| Years | Team | Apps | (Gls) |
| 2003–2004 | Proleter Zrenjanin | | |
| 2004–2005 | Glasinac Sokolac | | |
| 2005–2009 | Zrinjski Mostar | 104 | (18) |
| 2009–2011 | Widzew Łódź | 21 | (1) |
| 2011–2013 | Olimpik | 36 | (2) |
| 2013–2015 | Zrinjski Mostar | 56 | (3) |
| 2015–2016 | Vitez | 27 | (7) |
| 2016–2021 | Radnik Bijeljina | 147 | (21) |
| Total | | 391 | (52) |

International career
| 2009 | Bosnia and Herzegovina | 1 | (0) |

Managerial career
- 2021–2025: Radnik Bijeljina
- 2026–: Leotar
- * Club domestic league appearances and goals

Velibor Đurić (born 5 May 1982) is a Bosnian professional football manager and former player who is the manager of First League of RS club Leotar.

== Club career ==
Đurić played with the youth teams of Slavija Sarajevo and then with the first teams of Proleter Zrenjanin and Glasinac Sokolac before moving to Zrinjski Mostar in the summer of 2005. He won with Zrinjski the 2008–09 Bosnian Premier League and the 2007–08 Bosnian Cup.

Đurić's contract with Zrinjski expired on 30 June 2009 and he placed his signature under a 3-year contract with Widzew Łódź. He was released from Widzew on 16 July 2011. While at the club, he won the 2009–10 I liga.

After Łódź, Đurić also played for Olimpik, Zrinjski Mostar once again (with Zrinjski he again won the 2013–14 Bosnian Premier League) and Vitez. He totalled 202 official matches in all competitions for Zrinjski, which placed him third behind Pero Stojkić and Mario Ivanković on the club's all-time appearances list.

On 17 June 2016, Đurić signed a two-year contract with Radnik Bijeljina. While at Radnik, he also became the club captain. In June 2018, he extended his contract with Radnik. On 24 August 2019, he scored a hat-trick in Radnik's 3–0 home league win against Mladost Doboj Kakanj.

Đurić scored another hat-trick for Radnik, this time in his team's 0–4 away league win against, once again, Mladost Doboj Kakanj on 23 November 2019. He ended his career at Radnik in October 2021.

== International career ==
Đurić made one appearance for the Bosnia and Herzegovina national team in a June 2009 friendly match against Uzbekistan national team.

== Managerial career ==
=== Radnik Bijeljina ===
Right after ending his playing career, Đurić replaced Vlado Jagodić as Radnik Bijeljina's manager on 25 October 2021. He debuted as manager in a Bosnian Cup loss against Široki Brijeg on 27 October. Đurić's first win managing Radnik was against Velež Mostar in a league game on 31 October. He finished the season with the club in eleventh place, getting relegated from the top flight of Bosnian football.

Đurić remained manager following relegation and finished the 2022–23 First League of RS in seventh place. He led the side to the First League of RS title in the 2023–24 season, achieving promotion to the Bosnian Premier League. Radnik opened the 2024–25 season in the Bosnian Premier League with a 1–0 win over GOŠK Gabela on 3 August 2024. Following a string of poor results, Đurić left the club by mutual consent on 1 April 2025.

=== Leotar ===
In March 2026, Đurić was appointed manager of Leotar.

== Managerial statistics ==
As of match played 30 May 2026

Managerial record by team and tenure
| Team | From | To | Record | | | | | | | |
| Team | From | To | G | W | D | L | GF | GA | GD | Win % |
|---|---|---|---|---|---|---|---|---|---|---|
| Radnik Bijeljina | 25 October 2021 | 1 April 2025 | 118 | 51 | 28 | 39 | 174 | 132 | +42 | 43.22 |
| Leotar | 11 March 2026 | Present | 11 | 6 | 4 | 1 | 20 | 4 | +16 | 54.55 |
| Total | | | 129 | 57 | 32 | 40 | 194 | 136 | +58 | 44.19 |

== Honours ==
=== Player ===
Zrinjski Mostar

- Bosnian Premier League: 2008–09, 2013–14
- Bosnian Cup: 2007–08

Widzew Łódź

- I liga: 2009–10

Individual

- Bosnian Premier League Player of the Year: 2008

=== Manager ===
Radnik Bijeljina

- First League of RS: 2023–24
