= Mario Ivanković =

Bosnian and Croatian football manager (born 1975)

Personal information
- Date of birth: 8 February 1975 (age 51)
- Place of birth: Salzgitten, Austria
- Height: 1.84 m (6 ft 0 in)
- Position: Defender

Youth career
- Velež Mostar
- Zrinjski Mostar
- Dinamo Zagreb
- Varteks Varaždin

Senior career*
Years	Team	Apps	(Gls)
1993–1994	Neretva		
1994–1999	Varteks Varaždin	83	(4)
1997–1998	→ Zrinjski Mostar (loan)	29	(21)
1999–2000	Široki Brijeg		
2000–2001	Chemnitzer FC	10	(1)
2001–2002	Suwon Samsung Bluewings	0	(0)
2003–2004	Zrinjski Mostar		
2004–2005	Nejmeh	20	(3)
2005–2007	Brotnjo		
2007–2011	Zrinjski Mostar	92	(17)

International career
1995–1996	Croatia U20	5	(0)
1996	Croatia U21	2	(0)

Managerial career
- 2022–2023: Bosnia and Herzegovina U19
- 2023–2024: Zrinjski Mostar (caretaker)
- 2024–2025: Zrinjski Mostar
- 2025–2026: Muangthong United
- * Club domestic league appearances and goals

Mario "Maka" Ivanković (born 8 February 1975) is a Bosnian and Croatian professional football manager and former player.

== Playing career ==
Ivanković played one season for Chemnitzer FC in the 2. Bundesliga. He totalled 210 official matches in all competitions for Bosnian Premier League side Zrinjski Mostar, which placed him second behind Pero Stojkić and just ahead of Velibor Đurić on the club's all-time appearances list.

== Managerial statistics ==
As of 28 February 2026

Managerial record by team and tenure
Team	Nat.	From	To	Record								Ref.
Team	Nat.	From	To	G	W	D	L	GF	GA	GD	Win %	Ref.
Bosnia and Herzegovina U19	(Bosnia and Herzegovina)	1 July 2022	30 August 2023	10	2	3	5	13	16	−3	20.00	
Zrinjski Mostar (caretaker)	(Bosnia and Herzegovina)	20 November 2023	5 January 2024	7	4	1	2	14	6	+8	57.14	
Zrinjski Mostar	(Bosnia and Herzegovina)	20 June 2024	31 July 2025	48	33	6	9	89	38	+51	68.75	
Muangthong United	(Thailand)	29 December 2025	28 February 2026	7	0	1	6	4	15	−11	0.00	
Career Total				72	39	11	22	120	75	+45	54.17	

== Honours ==
=== Player ===
Neretva

- Croatian Second League: 1993–94 (South)

Suwon Samsung Bluewings

- Korean FA Cup: 2002
- AFC Champions League: 2001–02
- Asian Super Cup: 2001, 2002

Nejmeh

- Lebanese Premier League: 2004–05
- Lebanese Super Cup: 2004
- Lebanese Elite Cup: 2004

Zrinjski Mostar

- Bosnian Premier League: 2008–09
- Bosnian Cup: 2007–08

Individual

- Zrinjski Mostar Supporters' Player of the Season: 2007–08

=== Manager ===
Zrinjski Mostar

- Bosnian Premier League: 2024–25
- Bosnian Supercup: 2024

Individual

- Bosnian Premier League Manager of the Season: 2024–25
