= Ognjen Todorović =

Bosnian footballer

Personal information
- Date of birth: 24 March 1989 (age 37)
- Place of birth: Zenica, SFR Yugoslavia
- Height: 1.81 m (5 ft 11 in)
- Position: Left midfielder

Team information
- Current team: Slavija Sarajevo
- Number: 15

Youth career
- –2009: Dubrovnik 1919

Senior career*
| Years | Team | Apps | (Gls) |
| 2009–2012 | Slavija Sarajevo | 87 | (10) |
| 2012–2013 | Maccabi Petah Tikva | 6 | (0) |
| 2013–2015 | Sarajevo | 47 | (6) |
| 2015–2018 | Zrinjski Mostar | 111 | (22) |
| 2019–2020 | Osmanlıspor | 31 | (1) |
| 2020–2022 | Zrinjski Mostar | 32 | (2) |
| 2021–2022 | → Leotar (loan) | 25 | (0) |
| 2022–2023 | Leotar | 18 | (3) |
| 2023–2024 | Vršac | 42 | (5) |
| 2024–2025 | FAP | 22 | (1) |
| 2025– | Slavija Sarajevo | 18 | (3) |

International career
| 2018 | Bosnia and Herzegovina | 2 | (0) |
- * Club domestic league appearances and goals as of 5 September 2026

Ognjen Todorović (Serbian pronunciation: [ǒɡɲen todǒːroʋitɕ]; born 24 March 1989) is a Bosnian professional footballer who plays as a left midfielder for First League of RS club Slavija Sarajevo .

He also played for the Bosnia and Herzegovina national team in 2018.

== International career ==
Todorović made his debut for Bosnia and Herzegovina on 28 January 2018 in a friendly match against the USA.

== Career statistics ==
=== Club ===
As of match played 5 September 2026

Appearances and goals by club, season and competition
| Club | Season | League | | | National cup (Note: Includes Bosnian Cup, Serbian Cup) | | Continental | | Other | | Total | |
| Club | Season | Division | Apps | Goals | Apps | Goals | Apps | Goals | Apps | Goals | Apps | Goals |
|---|---|---|---|---|---|---|---|---|---|---|---|---|
| Slavija Sarajevo | 2008–09 | Bosnian Premier League | 7 | 0 | 1 | 1 | — | | — | | 8 | 1 |
| Slavija Sarajevo | 2009–10 | Bosnian Premier League | 26 | 4 | — | | 3 (Note: Appearances in UEFA Europa League) | 0 | — | | 29 | 4 |
| Slavija Sarajevo | 2010–11 | Bosnian Premier League | 28 | 1 | — | | — | | — | | 28 | 1 |
| Slavija Sarajevo | 2011–12 | Bosnian Premier League | 26 | 5 | — | | — | | — | | 26 | 5 |
| Slavija Sarajevo | Total | | 87 | 10 | 1 | 1 | 3 | 0 | — | | 91 | 11 |
| Maccabi Petah Tikva | 2012–13 | Liga Leumit | 6 | 0 | 0 | 0 | — | | — | | 6 | 0 |
| Sarajevo | 2012–13 | Bosnian Premier League | 14 | 2 | — | | — | | — | | 14 | 2 |
| Sarajevo | 2013–14 | Bosnian Premier League | 24 | 3 | 8 | 2 | 3 | 2 | — | | 35 | 7 |
| Sarajevo | 2014–15 | Bosnian Premier League | 9 | 1 | 2 | 0 | 0 | 0 | — | | 11 | 1 |
| Sarajevo | Total | | 47 | 6 | 10 | 2 | 3 | 2 | — | | 60 | 10 |
| Zrinjski Mostar | 2014–15 | Bosnian Premier League | 13 | 3 | — | | — | | — | | 13 | 3 |
| Zrinjski Mostar | 2015–16 | Bosnian Premier League | 29 | 7 | 1 | 0 | 2 | 0 | — | | 32 | 7 |
| Zrinjski Mostar | 2016–17 | Bosnian Premier League | 24 | 7 | 3 | 0 | 2 (Note: Appearances in UEFA Champions League) | 0 | — | | 29 | 7 |
| Zrinjski Mostar | 2017–18 | Bosnian Premier League | 28 | 3 | 1 | 0 | 2 | 2 | — | | 31 | 5 |
| Zrinjski Mostar | 2018–19 | Bosnian Premier League | 17 | 2 | 2 | 0 | 6 (Note: Two appearances in UEFA Champions League, four appearances in UEFA Europa League) | 1 | — | | 25 | 3 |
| Zrinjski Mostar | Total | | 111 | 22 | 7 | 0 | 12 | 3 | — | | 130 | 25 |
| Osmanlıspor | 2018–19 | TFF 1. Lig | 7 | 0 | — | | — | | 1 (Note: Appearance in the 2018–19 TFF 1. Lig promotion play-offs) | 0 | 8 | 0 |
| Osmanlıspor | 2019–20 | TFF 1. Lig | 24 | 1 | 0 | 0 | — | | — | | 24 | 1 |
| Osmanlıspor | Total | | 31 | 1 | 0 | 0 | — | | 1 | 0 | 32 | 1 |
| Zrinjski Mostar | 2020–21 | Bosnian Premier League | 32 | 2 | 1 | 1 | 3 | 0 | — | | 36 | 3 |
| Leotar (loan) | 2021–22 | Bosnian Premier League | 25 | 0 | 1 | 0 | — | | — | | 26 | 0 |
| Leotar | 2022–23 | Bosnian Premier League | 18 | 3 | 0 | 0 | — | | — | | 18 | 3 |
| Vršac | 2022–23 | Serbian First League | 17 | 2 | — | | — | | — | | 17 | 2 |
| Vršac | 2023–24 | Serbian First League | 25 | 3 | 2 | 0 | — | | — | | 27 | 3 |
| Vršac | Total | | 42 | 5 | 2 | 0 | — | | — | | 44 | 5 |
| FAP | 2024–25 | Serbian League West | ? | ? | 2 | 0 | — | | — | | 2 | 0 |
| FAP | 2025–26 | Serbian First League | 22 | 1 | — | | — | | — | | 22 | 1 |
| FAP | Total | | 22 | 1 | 2 | 0 | — | | — | | 24 | 1 |
| Slavija Sarajevo | 2025–26 | First League of RS | 14 | 3 | 0 | 0 | — | | — | | 14 | 3 |
| Slavija Sarajevo | 2026–27 | First League of RS | 4 | 0 | 0 | 0 | — | | — | | 4 | 0 |
| Slavija Sarajevo | Total | | 18 | 3 | 0 | 0 | — | | — | | 18 | 3 |
| Career total | | | 439 | 53 | 24 | 4 | 21 | 5 | 1 | 0 | 485 | 62 |

=== International ===
Appearances and goals by national team and year
| National team | Year | Apps | Goals |
|---|---|---|---|
Bosnia and Herzegovina
| Bosnia and Herzegovina | 2018 | 2 | 0 |
| Total | | 2 | 0 |

== Honours ==
Sarajevo

- Bosnian Cup: 2013–14

Zrinjski Mostar

- Bosnian Premier League: 2015–16, 2016–17, 2017–18
