= Sulejman Smajić =

Bosnian footballer (born 1984)

Personal information
- Date of birth: 13 August 1984 (age 42)
- Place of birth: Jajce, SFR Yugoslavia
- Height: 1.72 m (5 ft 8 in)
- Position: Winger

Team information
- Current team: Metalleghe-BSI (Sporting director)

Youth career
- –2001: Zrinjski Mostar

Senior career*
Years	Team	Apps	(Gls)
2001–2008	Zrinjski Mostar	115	(17)
2003–2004	→ Iskra Bugojno (loan)	19	(2)
2008–2009	Dender	28	(5)
2009–2011	Lokeren	29	(4)
2011–2013	Željezničar Sarajevo	21	(2)
2013–2016	Olimpik	63	(6)
2016–2019	Metalleghe BSI	52	(6)
Total		327	(42)

International career
2004–2006	Bosnia and Herzegovina U21	14	(1)
2006	Bosnia and Herzegovina	1	(0)

Managerial career
- 2019–: Metalleghe-BSI (Sporting director)
- * Club domestic league appearances and goals

Sulejman Smajić (born 13 August 1984) is a Bosnian retired professional footballer and sporting director of First League of FBiH club NK Metalleghe-BSI.

As a player, he also played for the Bosnia and Herzegovina U21 national team and the Bosnia and Herzegovina full national team.

== Club career ==
Smajić was a very creative midfielder whose career began in NK Iskra Bugojno, there he was spotted by HŠK Zrinjski Mostar who he joined in 2001. In 2003 he was transferred to Iskra on a season long loan. After coming back from his loan, he managed to win the championship title with Zrinjski in the Premier League of Bosnia and Herzegovina in 2005 and three years later, in 2008, the Bosnian Cup. After seven years at Zrinjski, he left the club and joined FCV Dender in the summer of 2008.

On 7 July 2009, Lokeren then signed Smajić from Dender on a three-year deal. In 2011, Smajić signed with Bosnian cup winners FK Željezničar Sarajevo. During his time with Željezničar, he won two Premier League titles and one cup. In June 2013, he joined FK Olimpik. He won the Bosnian Cup with Olimpik in 2015.

In 2016, Smajić left Olimpik and joined NK Metalleghe-BSI. In January 2019, Smajić decided to end his football career while at Metalleghe.

== International career ==
Smajić has played for the Under-21 team and made one senior appearance for Bosnia and Herzegovina, coming on as a late substitute for Mirko Hrgović in an October 2006 European Championship qualification match away against Moldova.

== Honours ==
=== Player ===
Zrinjski Mostar

- Bosnian Premier League: 2004–05
- Bosnian Cup: 2007–08

Željezničar Sarajevo

- Bosnian Premier League: 2011–12, 2012–13
- Bosnian Cup: 2011–12

Olimpik Sarajevo

- Bosnian Cup: 2014–15
