= Ultras Mostar =

Bosnian football fan club

Ultras-Zrinjski Mostar
- Abbreviation: UZM
- Founded: 10 April 1994; 32 years ago
- Type: Supporter's group, Ultras group
- Club: HŠK Zrinjski Mostar
- Location: Mostar, Bosnia and Herzegovina
- Arenas: Stadion HŠK Zrinjski; Bijeli Brijeg Hall
- Stand: East (Tribina Stajanje) (1994–2023); West (Sector A)
- Colours

Ultras Mostar is HŠK Zrinjski Mostar supporters' group in Bosnia and Herzegovina. The fan club was unofficially founded in 1994 and officially established in March 1998. While it promotes all sections of the sports club Zrinjski, it primarily promotes the football department.

== History ==
Ultras in the stands of Bijeli Brijeg Stadium during a Zrinjski game

Ultras Mostar was an unregistered fan club from 1994. It was officially established in March 1998, registered as part of the Registry of Citizens' Associations in the Herzegovina-Neretva Canton. The group consists of Bosnian Croats. While it supports all sports played by Zrinjski Mostar, it primarily supports the football club HŠK Zrinjski Mostar. Its main rivals are Red Army Mostar. Ultras Mostar has been involved in incidents where its members have been victims of attacks, or perpetrators of incidents, such as property destruction, stoning, singing nationalist songs, drawing graffiti, etc.
