= Mladen Žižović =

Bosnian footballer and manager (1980–2025)

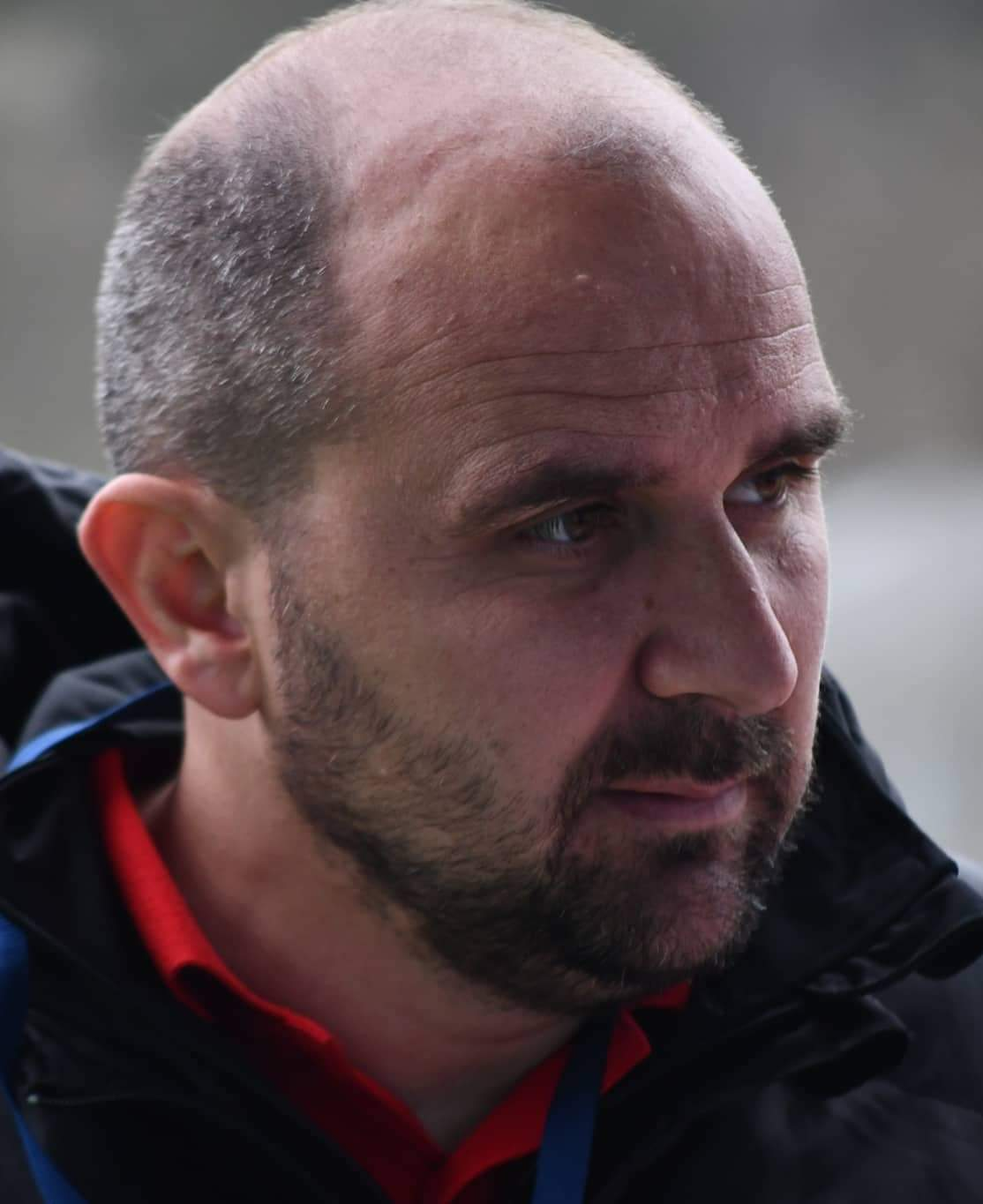
- Žižović with Sloboda Tuzla in 2021

Personal information
- Date of birth: 27 December 1980
- Place of birth: Rogatica, SR Bosnia and Herzegovina, SFR Yugoslavia
- Date of death: 3 November 2025 (aged 44)
- Place of death: Lučani, Serbia
- Position: Attacking midfielder

Youth career
- –1997: Mladost Rogatica

Senior career*
| Years | Team | Apps | (Gls) |
| 1997–1998 | Mladost Rogatica | 22 | (0) |
| 1998–2002 | Radnik Bijeljina | 75 | (17) |
| 2002–2005 | Rudar Ugljevik | 80 | (15) |
| 2005–2010 | Zrinjski Mostar | 122 | (34) |
| 2010–2011 | KF Tirana | 14 | (1) |
| 2011 | Zrinjski Mostar | 7 | (0) |
| 2012–2014 | Borac Banja Luka | 76 | (3) |
| 2015–2016 | Radnik Bijeljina | 22 | (2) |
| Total | | 418 | (72) |

International career
| 2008 | Bosnia and Herzegovina | 2 | (0) |

Managerial career
- 2017–2019: Radnik Bijeljina
- 2019–2020: Zrinjski Mostar
- 2021–2022: Sloboda Tuzla
- 2023: Al-Kholood
- 2023–2024: Shkupi
- 2024–2025: Borac Banja Luka
- 2025: Radnički 1923
- * Club domestic league appearances and goals

Mladen Žižović (Serbian Cyrillic: Младен Жижовић; 27 December 1980 – 3 November 2025) was a Bosnian professional football manager and player who played as an attacking midfielder. His playing career led him to domestic success with various clubs in Bosnia and Herzegovina and Albania.

After retiring, Žižović then went onto manage mostly in Southeast Europe. He most notably lead Borac Banja Luka to the 2024–25 UEFA Conference League round of 16.

== Club career ==
Born on 27 December 1980 in Rogatica, SFR Yugoslavia, modern-day Bosnia and Herzegovina, Žižović started playing football from an early age. He began his senior career in 1997, playing for hometown club Mladost Rogatica. Žižović moved to Radnik Bijeljina the following year where over four seasons and 75 league games, he scored 17 goals, winning the First League of the Republika Srpska in his second year with the club.

Žižović then joined Rudar Ugljevik in 2002, where he would again have a lengthy stint, before signing with Zrinjski Mostar, where he had his greatest output, winning the Bosnian Cup in the 2007–08 season and the Bosnian Premier League in the following season over five years with the Mostar side. In 2010, Žižović moved briefly to the Albanian capital to play for KF Tirana, where he again earned silverware after winning the 2010–11 Albanian Cup. After coming back to Bosnia and Herzegovina, he returned to Zrinjski, and then moved to Borac Banja Luka, playing for the club until 2014.

Žižović ended his playing career with his second senior club, Radnik Bijeljina, winning his second Bosnian Cup in the 2015–16 season, before retiring.

== International career ==
Žižović made his debut for Bosnia and Herzegovina in a January 2008 friendly match away against Japan. His second and final international was a June 2008 friendly against Azerbaijan.

== Managerial career ==
In May 2017, as his playing career ended the previous year, Radnik Bijeljina offered Žižović to manage the club. In the 2018–19 season, he guided Radnik to the UEFA Europa League qualifiers. He then went on to manage Zrinjski Mostar from November 2019 until December 2020, where he was tasked with a squad rebuild.

Žižović also managed Sloboda Tuzla, and had a brief stint at Saudi First Division side Al-Kholood in 2023. At Macedonian club Shkupi, he managed to develop multiple youth players who went on to have successful careers.

On 11 June 2024, Žižović was appointed manager of Borac Banja Luka. He guided Borac to the last 16 of the knockout stage of the 2024–25 UEFA Conference League, eventually getting eliminated by Rapid Wien 3–2 on aggregate. Borac ended the 2024–25 season as Bosnian Premier League runners-up, just one point behind champions Zrinjski.

On 23 October 2025, Žižović was appointed manager of Serbian SuperLiga side Radnički 1923, managing them until his sudden death a few weeks later during his third game in charge.

== Death ==
Žižović died aged 44 on 3 November 2025 in Lučani, Serbia, after suffering a heart attack on the sideline while managing Radnički 1923 during a Serbian SuperLiga game against Mladost Lučani. He was buried in Bijeljina, Bosnia and Herzegovina on 6 November.

Following Žižović's death, Radnički 1923, his former club Borac, as well as numerous other clubs from Bosnia and Herzegovina and Serbia paid tribute in statements, along with Mladost Lučani manager Nenad Lalatović, who attempted to help Žižović during the heart attack, stating "...The football world has lost a great human being." Additionally, Borac retired the number 8 shirt, which he wore during his time playing for the club.

== Managerial statistics ==
Managerial record by team and tenure
| Team | From | To | Record | | | | | | | |
| Team | From | To | G | W | D | L | GF | GA | GD | Win % |
|---|---|---|---|---|---|---|---|---|---|---|
| Radnik Bijeljina | 9 May 2017 | 11 November 2019 | 90 | 32 | 25 | 33 | 105 | 102 | +3 | 35.56 |
| Zrinjski Mostar | 12 November 2019 | 26 December 2020 | 28 | 17 | 5 | 6 | 51 | 25 | +26 | 60.71 |
| Sloboda Tuzla | 15 March 2021 | 24 March 2022 | 38 | 11 | 14 | 13 | 30 | 33 | −3 | 28.95 |
| Al-Kholood | 22 June 2023 | 28 August 2023 | 3 | 0 | 1 | 2 | 3 | 5 | −2 | 0.00 |
| Shkupi | 9 September 2023 | 18 April 2024 | 21 | 13 | 6 | 2 | 31 | 11 | +20 | 61.90 |
| Borac Banja Luka | 11 June 2024 | 18 July 2025 | 60 | 38 | 8 | 14 | 88 | 41 | +47 | 63.33 |
| Radnički 1923 | 23 October 2025 | 3 November 2025 | 2 | 1 | 0 | 1 | 3 | 3 | +0 | 50.00 |
| Total | | | 243 | 113 | 59 | 71 | 313 | 221 | +92 | 46.50 |

== Honours ==
=== Player ===
Radnik Bijeljina

- First League of RS: 1998–99
- Bosnian Cup: 2015–16

Zrinjski Mostar

- Bosnian Premier League: 2008–09
- Bosnian Cup: 2007–08

KF Tirana

- Albanian Cup: 2010–11
