= Krešimir Kordić =

Croatian retired football player (born 1981)

Personal information
- Full name: Krešimir Kordić
- Date of birth: 3 September 1981 (age 45)
- Place of birth: Mostar, SR Bosnia and Herzegovina, SFR Yugoslavia
- Height: 1.91 m (6 ft 3 in)
- Position: Forward

Youth career
- 1993–1997: Zrinjski Mostar
- 1997–1999: Hajduk Split

Senior career*
Years	Team	Apps	(Gls)
2000–2001	Zrinjski Mostar	43	(16)
2002	Hrvatski Dragovoljac	3	(0)
2002–2004	Zadar	32	(7)
2005–2007	Zrinjski Mostar	45	(21)
2007–2008	Posušje	29	(16)
2008–2010	Zrinjski Mostar	71	(33)
2010–2012	Slovan Bratislava	25	(5)
2012	→ DAC Dunajská Streda (loan)	10	(1)
2012–2014	Široki Brijeg	64	(25)
2014–2016	Zrinjski Mostar	30	(5)
Total		352	(129)

Managerial career
- 2022-2024: Zrinjski Mostar (youth)
- * Club domestic league appearances and goals

Krešimir Kordić (born 3 September 1981) is a Croatian retired football player.

== Club career ==
Kordić made his professional debut for boyhood and hometown club Zrinjski Mostar in 1999. In his first two seasons as a professional, the striker scored 16 goals in 43 appearances, earning himself a move to 1. HNL side Hrvatski Dragovoljac in January 2002. After six months with NK Hrvatski Dragovoljac where Krešimir failed to establish himself as a first team regular, he moved to Croatian side Zadar. In three years with Zadar, Kordić managed seven goals in 32 appearances.

In 2005, Kordić made his return to Mostar, resigning with HŠK Zrinjski Mostar. His spell at Zrinjski was very successful, scoring 21 goals in 44 games. In 2007, Kordić moved to fellow Croatian - Hercegovinian side Posušje and had another successful season. After just one year with Posušje, Kordić moved back to Zrinjski and scored 33 goals in 71 games over the next two seasons.

In 2010, Kordic made his first international transfer, moving to Slovak side Slovan Bratislava. Kordic won the Corgoň liga and Slovak Cup in his first season with the Slovak club and scored 5 goals in 20 games. Before the end of his contract with Slovan Bratislava he was loaned out to DAC 1904 Dunajská Streda in 2012 and spent three months there.

Once his contract with Slovan expired, Široki Brijeg enticed him back to Bosnia and Herzegovina and he signed a two-year contract. He scored 25 goals in 63 games in national and continental competitions for Široki.

In the summer of 2014, newly crowned champions of Bosnia and Hercegovina Zrinjski Mostar brought back the fan favourite as their first reinforcement. The last season of his contract, he won third championship with Zrinjski. He scored the most goals (75) in Zrijnski's history and he is currently on the fourth (4) place of Bosnian Premier league topscorers from beginning scoring 84 goals. Also he is one of successful players from Bosnia and Herzegovina winning 4 national championships and 2 cups.

== Career statistics ==
=== Club ===
Club	Season	League			Cup		Continental		Total	
Club	Season	Division	Apps	Goals	Apps	Goals	Apps	Goals	Apps	Goals
Bosna and Herzegovina		League			Cup		Europe		Total	
HŠK Zrinjski Mostar	2000–01	Premijer Liga	26	12	1	1	–		27	13
HŠK Zrinjski Mostar	2001–02	Premijer liga	14	2	2	1	–		16	3
HŠK Zrinjski Mostar	2004–05	Premijer liga	3	1	2	1	–		5	2
HŠK Zrinjski Mostar	2005–06	Premijer liga	13	5	3	3	–		16	8
HŠK Zrinjski Mostar	2006–07	Premijer liga	21	9	1	1	2	1	24	11
HŠK Zrinjski Mostar	2008–09	Premijer liga	29	13	7	4	2	0	38	17
HŠK Zrinjski Mostar	2009–10	Premijer liga	25	10	6	5	2	1	33	16
HŠK Zrinjski Mostar	2014–15	Premijer liga	19	1	6	4	2	0	27	5
HŠK Zrinjski Mostar	2015–16	Premijer liga	3	0	-		–		3	0
HŠK Zrinjski Mostar	Total		151	53	28	20	8	2	189	75
NK Posušje	2007–08	Premijer liga	23	11	6	5	–		29	16
NK Posušje	Total		23	11	6	5	–		29	16
NK Široki Brijeg	2013–14	Premijer liga	24	12	9	4	2	0	35	16
NK Široki Brijeg	2014–15	Premijer liga	22	7	4	1	3	1	29	9
NK Široki Brijeg	Total		46	19	13	5	5	1	64	25
Croatia		League			Cup		Europe		Total	
NK Hrvatski dragovoljac	2001–02	1. HNL	3	0	–		–		3	0
NK Zadar	2002–03	1. HNL	12	2	1	0	–		13	2
NK Zadar	2003–04	1. HNL	13	2	-		-		13	2
NK Zadar	2004–05	1. HNL	6	3	-		-		6	3
NK Zadar	Total		31	7	1	0	-		35	7
Slovakia		League			Cup		Europe		Total	
Slovan Bratislava	2010–11	Corgon Liga	15	2	5	3	–		20	5
Slovan Bratislava	2011–12	Corgon Liga	5	0	–		–		5	0
Slovan Bratislava	Total		20	2	5	3	–		25	5
Dunajska Streda (loan)	2011–12	Corgon Liga	10	1	-		–		10	1
Dunajska Streda (loan)	Total		10	1	-		-		10	1
Total	Bosnia and Herzegovina		222	83	47	30	13	3	282	116
Total	Croatia		34	7	1	0	-		35	7
Total	Slovakia		30	3	5	3	-		35	6
Career total			286	93	53	33	13	3	352	129

== Honours ==
Club

HŠK Zrinjski Mostar

- Bosnian Premier League: 2004–05, 2008-09, 2015–16

ŠK Slovan Bratislava

- Fortuna Liga: 2010–11,
- Slovak Cup: 2010–11,

NK Široki Brijeg

- Bosnian Cup : 2012–13

== Individual ==
- Record Bosnia-Herzegovina Cup scorer of all time with 30 goals
- Record HŠK Zrinjski Mostar Top Goalscorer in Bosnia-Herzegovina Cup with 20 goals
- HŠK Zrinjski Mostar Top Goalscorer (5) : 2000–01, 2005–06, 2006–07, 2008–09, 2009–10
- HŠK Zrinjski Mostar all time XI
- HŠK Zrinjski Mostar Player of the Season 2008–09 by supporters
- NK Široki Brijeg Top Goalscorer : 2012/13
- Premier League of Bosnia and Herzegovina Team of the Year (3): 2007, 2009, 2013
- Third highest scorer Premier League of Bosnia and Herzegovina and Bosnia-Herzegovina Cup of all time with 113 goals
