= NK Zelina =

Croatian football club

Zelina
- Full name: Nogometni Klub Zelina
- Founded: 1907; 118 years ago
- Ground: Gradski stadion Zelina
- Capacity: 1,000
- Chairman: Vlado Žigrović
- Manager: Dražen Biškup
- League: 4. HNL
- Website: http://www.nk-zelina.hr/
Home colours	Away colours

Nogometni Klub Zelina is a Croatian football club based in the town of Sveti Ivan Zelina. Zelina competed in the 4. HNL in the 2018–19 season.

== Current squad ==
Note: Flags indicate national team as defined under FIFA eligibility rules; some limited exceptions apply. Players may hold more than one non-FIFA nationality.

No.	Pos.	Nation	Player
—	GK	(Croatia) CRO	Denis Krklec
—	GK	(Croatia) CRO	David Pintar
—	GK	(Croatia) CRO	Antonio Jurjević
—	DF	(Croatia) CRO	Jurica Kotarski
—	DF	(Croatia) CRO	Josip Balentović
—	DF	(Croatia) CRO	Tomislav Nikolić
—	DF	(Bosnia and Herzegovina) BIH	Emilko Janković
—	DF	(Croatia) CRO	Petar Bašić
—	DF	(Croatia) CRO	Antonio Župan
—	DF	(Croatia) CRO	Josip Srdarović
—	MF	(Croatia) CRO	Matej Krišto
—	MF	(Croatia) CRO	Tomislav Bičak
—	MF	(Bosnia and Herzegovina) BIH	Mateo Duvnjak
—	MF	(Croatia) CRO	Dorian Puretić

No.	Pos.	Nation	Player
—	MF	(Croatia) CRO	Matija Micić
—	MF	(Croatia) CRO	Vjekosalv Kolar
—	MF	(Croatia) CRO	Stjepan Pajac
—	MF	(Croatia) CRO	Ivan Peteljak
—	MF	(Croatia) CRO	Jakob Raić
—	MF	(Croatia) CRO	Josip Jurjević
—	MF	(Suriname) SUR	Sergio Zijler
—	MF	(Croatia) CRO	Filip Borak
—	FW	(Croatia) CRO	Andrej Vuk
—	FW	(Croatia) CRO	Gabriel Barilar
—	FW	(Croatia) CRO	Florijan Ovčar
—	FW	(Croatia) CRO	Ivan Presečan
—	FW	(Croatia) CRO	Domagoj Habek
—	FW	(Croatia) CRO	Matija Poredski

== Honours ==
(Croatia) Treća HNL – West:

- Winners (1): 2011–12
