= 2007–08 Bosnia and Herzegovina Football Cup =

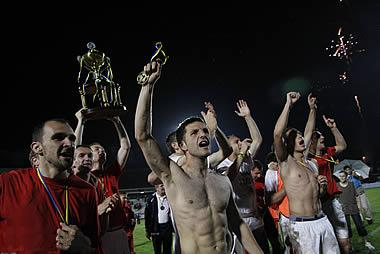
- Zrinjski celebrating their cup title win

Tournament details
- Country: Bosnia and Herzegovina
- Teams: 32

Final positions
- Champions: Zrinjski (1st title)
- Runners-up: Sloboda

2007–08 Bosnia and Herzegovina Football Cup was the fourteenth season of the Bosnia and Herzegovina's annual football cup, and an eighth season of the unified competition. The competition started on 24 October 2007 with the First Round and concluded on 4 June 2008 with the Final.

== First round ==
Thirty-two teams entered in the First Round. The matches were played on 24 and 30 October 2007.

Team 1	Score	Team 2
Čelik Zenica	3–0	Jedinstvo Bihać
Široki Brijeg	1–0	Žepče
Leotar	4–1	Drinovci
Modriča Maxima	5–0	Troglav
Posušje	5–0	Radnik Bijeljina
Travnik	2–1	Ljubić Prnjavor
Sloboda Tuzla	1–0	Budućnost Banovići
Borac Šamac	0–1	Slavija
Drina HE Višegrad	0–3	Zrinjski
Igman Konjic	1–2	Velež
Željezničar	5–0	Kolina Ustikolina
Orašje	2–0	Podgrmeč Sanski Most
Radnik Hadžići	1–5	Sarajevo
Brotnjo	5–0	Sloga Doboj
Bratstvo Gračanica	2–2 (6–5 p)	Rudar Kakanj
Borac Banja Luka	0–2	Laktaši

== Second round ==
The 16 winners from the prior round enter this round. The first legs were played on 7 November and the second legs were played on 27 and 28 November 2007.

Team 1	Agg.	Team 2	1st leg	2nd leg
Travnik	1–2	Leotar	0–0	1–2
Modriča Maxima	5–6	Željezničar	3–3	2–3
Slavija	2–4	Zrinjski	2–3	0–1
Sarajevo	2–2 (7–6 p)	Velež	1–1	1–1
Posušje	4–0	Čelik Zenica	2–0	2–0
Orašje	1–5	Sloboda Tuzla	0–0	1–5
Brotnjo	3–6	Laktaši	2–2	1–4
Bratstvo Gračanica	1–4	Široki Brijeg	0–1	1–3

== Quarterfinals ==
The eight winners from the prior round enter this round. The first legs were played on 5 and 12 March and the second legs were played on 19 March 2008.

Team 1	Agg.	Team 2	1st leg	2nd leg
Sloboda Tuzla	6–2	Leotar	6–1	0–1
Zrinjski Mostar	1–1 (3–2 p)	Široki Brijeg	1–0	0–1
Posušje	4–1	Laktaši	1–0	3–1
Željezničar	5–5 (a)	Sarajevo	3–1	2–4

== Semifinals ==
The four winners from the prior round enter this round. The first legs will be played on 9 April and the second legs were played on 23 April 2008.

Team 1	Agg.	Team 2	1st leg	2nd leg
Željezničar	1–2	Sloboda Tuzla	1–1	0–1
Zrinjski	6–0	Posušje	4–0	2–0

== Final ==
=== First leg ===
14 May 2008
20:15 CEST

Sloboda	2–1	Zrinjski
Husejinović 14'; Kasapović 90' (pen.)	Report	Prodanović 65' (o.g.)

Stadion Tušanj, Tuzla
Attendance: 5,000
Referee: Dragan Skakić (Gradiška)

=== Second leg ===
4 June 2008
20:15 CEST

Zrinjski	2–1	Sloboda
Džidić 30'; Landeka 66'	Report	Tosunović 47'
Penalties
Ivanković (penalty scored); Đurić (penalty scored); Žižović (penalty scored); Landeka (penalty scored)	4–1	(penalty scored) Osmanhodžić; (penalty missed) Tosunović; (penalty missed) Husejinović

Stadion pod Bijelim Brijegom, Mostar
Attendance: 6,000
Referee: Rusmir Mrković (Sarajevo)

Zrinjski 3–3 Sloboda on aggregate. Zrinjski won 4–1 on penalties.

== See also ==
- 2007–08 Premier League of Bosnia and Herzegovina
