= Zrinjski Mostar =

Sports association from Mostar, Bosnia and Herzegovina

- Full name: Hrvatski športski klub Zrinjski Mostar
- Nicknames: Plemići (The Noblemen)
- Short name: HŠK “Zrinjski”
- Sports: 7 clubs in 7 different sports
- Founded: 1905; 120 years ago
- Based in: Mostar, Bosnia and Herzegovina
- Arena: Bijeli Brijeg Hall
- Stadium: Stadion pod Bijelim Brijegom
- Colours: White and Red
- Official fan club: Ultras Mostar
- Website: www.zrinjski.info

Zrinjski Mostar is a sports association from the city of Mostar, Bosnia and Herzegovina. It was formed in 1905.

== Member clubs ==
- Football:
  - HŠK Zrinjski Mostar
- Basketball:
  - HKK Zrinjski Mostar (men's)
  - ŽKK Zrinjski Mostar (women's)
- Handball:
  - HMRK Zrinjski Mostar (men's)
  - HŽRK Zrinjski Mostar (women's)
- Futsal:
  - HFC Zrinjski Mostar
- Boxing:
  - HBK Zrinjski Mostar
- Athletics:
  - HAK Zrinjski Mostar
- Swimming:
  - APK Zrinjski Mostar
