= Ivan Crnov =

Bosnian association football player

Personal information
- Full name: Ivan Crnov
- Date of birth: 1 February 1990 (age 36)
- Place of birth: Gornji Vakuf-Uskoplje, SFR Yugoslavia
- Height: 1.83 m (6 ft 0 in)
- Positions: Midfielder; winger

Team information
- Current team: Krka

Youth career
- 2000-2006: Dinamo Zagreb
- 2006-2009: Croatia Sesvete

Senior career*
Years	Team	Apps	(Gls)
2009–2010	Croatia Sesvete	1	(0)
2010–2012	Gorica	40	(7)
2013–2015	Zrinjski Mostar	64	(19)
2015	Sheriff Tiraspol	0	(0)
2015–2016	Široki Brijeg	39	(3)
2017–2018	Željezničar	11	(1)
2018	Krupa	15	(2)
2019	Triglav Kranj	17	(3)
2019–2020	Borac Banja Luka	24	(2)
2021	Cibalia	10	(3)
2021	Sesvete	14	(1)
2022-	Krka	12	(1)
- * Club domestic league appearances and goals as of 27 March 2021

Ivan Crnov (born 1 February 1990) is a Bosnian born-Croatian professional footballer, currently playing for Slovenian second-tier side Krka.

== Honours ==
Gorica

- 2. HNL: 2010–11

Zrinjski Mostar

- Bosnian Premier League: 2013–14

Sheriff Tiraspol

- Moldovan Super Cup: 2015

Željezničar

- Bosnian Cup: 2017–18
