= Emilko Janković =

Bosnian-Herzegovinian football defender (born 1984)

Personal information
- Date of birth: 27 March 1984 (age 42)
- Place of birth: Banja Luka, Bosnia and Herzegovina
- Height: 1.82 m (5 ft 11 1/2 in)
- Position: Defender

Team information
- Current team: Karlovac
- Number: 17

Youth career
- FK Džaja Banja Luka
- Borac Banja Luka

Senior career*
Years	Team	Apps	(Gls)
2003–2005	Borac Banja Luka		
2004	-> FK Krila Borca (loan)		
2005	-> Kozara (loan)		
2006	Panachaiki		
2006	Borac Banja Luka		
2007–2008	Segesta		
2008–2009	Inter Zaprešić	0	(0)
2008–2009	-> Segesta (loan)	20	(1)
2009–2011	Lučko	38	(0)
2011	Karlovac	11	(0)
2012	Rudar Prijedor	22	(0)
2013	Vinogradar	12	(2)
2013-2014	Zelina	29	(1)
2014	Sloboda Tuzla	9	(0)
2015-2016	Sloboda MG		
2019-2020	Lipik		
- * Club domestic league appearances and goals as of 15 October 2011

Emilko Janković (born 27 March 1984 in Banja Luka) is a Bosnian-Herzegovinian football defender who last played as a defender for NK Karlovac in the Croatian Prva HNL.

== Club career ==
Janković previously played for FK Kozara Gradiška and FK Borac Banja Luka. He first went abroad to play for Panachaiki in the Greek Beta Ethniki. He also played with NK Segesta and NK Inter Zaprešić in Croatia.
