= Pero Stojkić =

Bosnian retired professional footballer (born 1986)

Personal information
- Date of birth: 9 December 1986 (age 39)
- Place of birth: Mostar, SFR Yugoslavia
- Height: 1.82 m (5 ft 11 1/2 in)
- Position: Left-back

Youth career
- –2004: Zrinjski Mostar

Senior career*
Years	Team	Apps	(Gls)
2005–2006	Zrinjski Mostar	4	(0)
2006–2007	Branitelj		
2007–2010	Zmaj Makarska	56	(7)
2010–2011	Osijek	16	(0)
2011–2021	Zrinjski Mostar	217	(15)
Total		293	(22)
- * Club domestic league appearances and goals

Pero Stojkić (born 9 December 1986) is a Bosnian retired professional footballer who played as a left-back.

== Club career ==
He was the long-time captain of Bosnian Premier League club Zrinjski Mostar. Stojkić won five Bosnian Premier League titles with Zrinjski in the seasons 2004–05, 2013–14, 2015–16, 2016–17 and 2017–18. He announced his immediate retirement in January 2021 after making a club record of 257 official appearances for the club.

== Honours ==
Zrinjski Mostar

- Bosnian Premier League: 2004–05, 2013–14, 2015–16, 2016–17, 2017–18
