= 2008–09 Premier League of Bosnia and Herzegovina =

Premijer Liga
- Season: 2008–09
- Champions: Zrinjski; 2nd Premier League title 2nd Bosnian title
- Relegated: Orašje; Posušje
- Champions League: Zrinjski
- Europa League: Sarajevo; Široki Brijeg; Slavija (via domestic cup)
- Matches: 240
- Goals: 611 (2.55 per match)
- Top goalscorer: Darko Spalević (17 goals)
- Biggest home win: Velež 6–0 Modriča
- Biggest away win: Posušje 0–3 Borac; Posušje 0–3 Čelik
- Highest scoring: Velež 5–3 Zvijezda

The 2008–09 Premier League of Bosnia and Herzegovina (Bosnian: Premijer Liga) was the ninth season since its establishment and the seventh as a unified country-wide league. It started on 2 August 2008 and ended on 23 May 2009. Modriča were the defending champions.

== Promotion and relegation ==
Jedinstvo Bihać and Žepče were relegated after the 2007–08 season due to finishing in 15th and 16th place, respectively.

They were replaced by the champions of two second-level leagues, Zvijezda Gradačac (Prva Liga BiH) and Borac Banja Luka (Prva Liga RS).

== Clubs and stadia ==
Location of clubs in Premijer Liga 2008–09

Team	Location	Stadium
Borac	Banja Luka	City Stadium of Banja Luka
Čelik	Zenica	Bilino Polje
Laktaši	Laktaši	Gradski Stadion, Laktaši
Leotar	Trebinje	Police Stadium
Modriča	Modriča	Maxima Stadium
Orašje	Orašje	Gradski Stadion Orašje
Posušje	Posušje	Mokri Dolac Stadium
Sarajevo	Sarajevo	Asim Ferhatović Hase Stadium
Slavija	Istočno Sarajevo	Gradski SRC Slavija Stadium
Sloboda	Tuzla	Tušanj Stadium
Široki Brijeg	Široki Brijeg	Pecara Stadium
Travnik	Travnik	Stadion Pirota
Velež	Mostar	Vrapčići Stadium
Zrinjski	Mostar	Bijeli Brijeg Stadium
Zvijezda	Gradačac	Banja Ilidža
Željezničar	Sarajevo	Grbavica Stadium

== League table ==
Pos	Team	Pld	W	D	L	GF	GA	GD	Pts	Qualification or relegation
1	Zrinjski (C)	30	18	3	9	50	37	+13	57	Qualification to Champions League second qualifying round
2	Slavija	30	15	7	8	36	28	+8	52	Qualification to Europa League second qualifying round (Note: Slavija won 2008–09 Bosnian Cup and thereby qualified for the second qualifying round of the UEFA Europa League. Since they also finished second in the league, all three Europa League spots were awarded to teams according to their league positions.)
3	Sloboda Tuzla	30	15	5	10	32	26	+6	50	Ineligible for 2009–10 European competitions (Note: Borac Banja Luka and Sloboda Tuzla were denied a license for European competitions so their places were taken by next best finishers who obtained the license. Thereby, Sarajevo qualified for the second instead of first qualifying round of the UEFA Europa League, while the remaining spot in the first qualifying round of the UEFA Europa League was given to Široki Brijeg.)
4	Sarajevo	30	14	7	9	43	30	+13	49 (Note: Sarajevo ahead of Borac Banja Luka on head-to-head record: Sarajevo–Borac Banja Luka 2–1, Borac Banja Luka–Sarajevo 0–0.)	Qualification to Europa League second qualifying round
5	Borac Banja Luka	30	15	4	11	45	26	+19	49	Ineligible for 2009–10 European competitions
6	Široki Brijeg	30	14	3	13	47	38	+9	45	Qualification to Europa League first qualifying round
7	Zvijezda	30	11	10	9	43	38	+5	43	
8	Laktaši	30	12	6	12	43	39	+4	42	
9	Željezničar	30	13	3	14	30	35	−5	42	
10	Čelik	30	12	5	13	29	32	−3	41	
11	Leotar	30	12	3	15	32	42	−10	39	
12	Velež	30	11	4	15	42	45	−3	37	
13	Modriča	30	10	7	13	37	41	−4	37	
14	Travnik	30	11	4	15	38	53	−15	37	
15	Orašje (R)	30	9	7	14	33	43	−10	34	Relegation to Prva Liga FBiH
16	Posušje (R)	30	5	8	17	31	58	−27	23	Relegation to Prva Liga FBiH

Source: RSSSF.org
Rules for classification: 1st points; 2nd goal difference; 3rd goals scored
For deciding champions, qualification to UEFA Europa League and relegation: 1st points; 2nd head-to-head points; 3rd head-to-head goal difference; 4th head-to-head goals scored; 5th head-to-head away goals scored; 6th goal difference; 7th goals scored
(C) Champions; (R) Relegated

== Results ==
Home \ Away	BOR	ČEL	LAK	LEO	MOD	ORA	POS	SAR	SLA	SLO	ŠB	TRA	VEL	ZRI	ZVI	ŽEL
Borac Banja Luka		3–0	0–1	2–0	2–0	1–0	4–0	0–0	1–1	4–0	2–0	3–1	2–0	1–2	4–0	2–0
Čelik	1–2		1–0	1–0	1–0	1–0	2–2	3–1	2–0	3–0	3–0	1–0	1–0	0–0	0–0	2–0
Laktaši	0–2	3–0		4–0	1–1	3–1	1–2	2–0	1–1	1–0	2–1	2–0	2–0	3–4	2–1	3–1
Leotar	2–0	1–0	3–2		2–1	1–0	3–1	1–0	1–1	2–1	1–0	3–0	2–2	2–1	1–1	2–1
Modriča	1–1	2–0	2–0	1–0		0–0	2–2	2–0	0–1	1–1	2–0	4–1	3–3	2–0	2–1	3–2
Orašje	1–1	1–1	2–2	3–0	0–2		2–1	2–2	2–1	0–0	2–0	4–0	1–0	3–2	1–1	2–1
Posušje	0–3	0–3	2–2	2–0	1–1	1–2		1–3	2–1	0–1	1–2	1–1	3–1	2–2	1–1	3–0
Sarajevo	2–1	1–0	1–0	1–0	2–1	2–0	4–0		1–1	2–1	1–2	6–1	3–0	3–0	2–1	0–0
Slavija	1–0	2–0	1–1	2–1	3–1	2–0	2–0	2–1		0–0	2–0	1–0	2–1	1–0	2–1	1–0
Sloboda Tuzla	0–1	2–0	4–1	1–0	3–0	1–0	3–0	0–0	1–0		1–0	2–0	2–0	2–1	1–0	1–0
Široki Brijeg	4–1	4–0	0–1	2–1	2–1	4–0	2–0	1–1	2–0	4–1		5–1	4–1	3–0	1–1	3–1
Travnik	1–0	1–0	5–2	3–1	1–0	3–1	3–2	1–2	1–1	1–1	3–0		3–0	1–2	2–1	3–2
Velež	2–0	3–1	1–0	3–1	6–0	2–0	2–1	1–1	2–3	2–0	3–0	1–0		0–2	5–3	0–0
Zrinjski	3–2	1–0	2–1	1–0	1–0	3–1	0–0	2–0	3–0	2–1	3–1	3–0	2–1		4–3	3–1
Zvijezda	2–0	2–2	0–0	2–0	3–2	3–1	4–0	2–1	2–1	1–0	0–0	0–0	2–0	2–1		1–0
Željezničar	1–0	1–0	1–0	3–1	1–0	2–1	1–0	2–0	1–0	0–1	2–0	2–1	1–0	1–0	2–2	

Source: bihsoccer.com (in Bosnian)
Legend: Blue = home team win; Yellow = draw; Red = away team win.

== Top goalscorers ==
Rank	Player	Club	Goals
1	(Serbia) Darko Spalević	Slavija	17
2	(Bosnia and Herzegovina) Krešimir Kordić	Zrinjski	13
3	(Bosnia and Herzegovina) Mladen Bojić	Modriča	10
3	(Croatia) Damir Smajlović	Zvijezda	10
3	(Bosnia and Herzegovina) Adis Obad	Velež	10
6	(Bosnia and Herzegovina) Zoran Kokot	Slavija	9
6	(Bosnia and Herzegovina) Emir Hadžić	Čelik	9
6	(Colombia) Phil Jackson	Čelik	9
6	(Bosnia and Herzegovina) Dalibor Šilić	Široki Brijeg	9
