= HŠK Zrinjski Mostar =

Association football club in Bosnia and Herzegovina

Zrinjski Mostar
- Full name: Hrvatski športski klub Zrinjski Mostar
- Nickname: Plemići (The Nobles)
- Short name: Zrinjski, ZRI
- Founded: 1905; 121 years ago 1992; 34 years ago (refounded)
- Ground: Stadion pod Bijelim Brijegom
- Capacity: 7,255
- Chairman: Denis Lasić
- Head coach: Simon Rožman
- League: Premier League BH
- 2025–26: Premier League BH, 2nd of 10
- Website: www.hskzrinjski.ba
Home colours	Away colours	Third colours

HŠK Zrinjski Mostar (Croatian: Hrvatski športski klub Zrinjski Mostar, lit. 'Croat Sports Club Zrinjski Mostar'), colloquially referred to as Zrinjski Mostar or simply Zrinjski, is a professional football club, based in Mostar, Bosnia and Herzegovina. The club plays in the Premier League of Bosnia and Herzegovina and with nine Premier League titles, Zrinjski is one of the most decorated football clubs in the country. The club plays its home matches at Stadion pod Bijelim Brijegom in Mostar. Zrinjski's fans are called Ultras Mostar, and the fan club was founded in 1994. In 2023, they became the first-ever club from Bosnia and Herzegovina to reach the group stage of a European club competition, the 2023–24 UEFA Europa Conference League.

Zrinjski Mostar was founded by Croat youth in 1905 in what was then Austria-Hungary and is the oldest football club in Bosnia and Herzegovina. After World War II, all clubs that had participated in the wartime Croatian league were banned in the Yugoslavia, with Zrinjski among them. The ban lasted from 1945 to 1992. The club was reformed after Bosnia and Herzegovina's independence. It played in the First League of Herzeg-Bosnia until 2000 when it joined the Premier League. In 2005, Zrinjski celebrated its first championship crown in the Premier League of Bosnia and Herzegovina.

Today, the football team is part of the Zrinjski Mostar sports society. They have a bitter rivalry with city neighbours, Velež.

== History ==
=== The beginning and early years ===
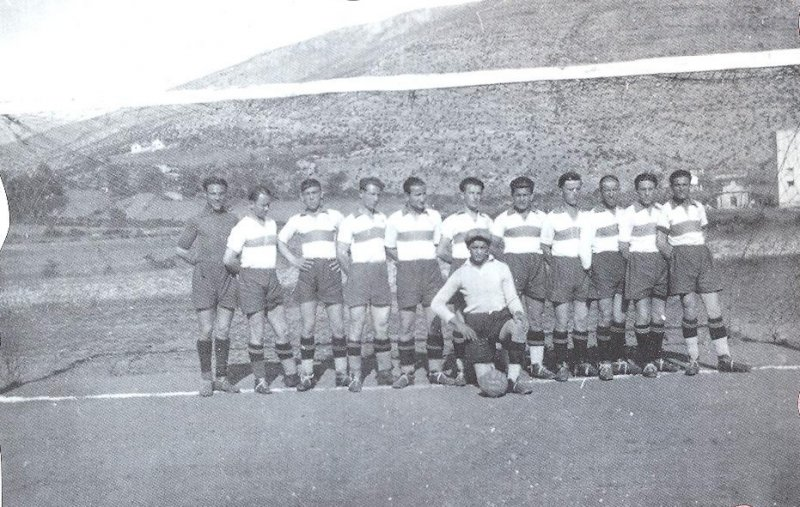
The Zrinjski team in Mostar, 1929

In 1896, several distinguished Herzegovinians from Mostar had the idea of forming a youth sports society named Hrvatski sokol (Croatian Falcon). At the time, this was not allowed, but in 1905, Croat youth led by Professor Kuštreb succeeded. With the help of the cultural society "Hrvoje," they formed the "Đački športski klub" (Student Sports Club). In 1912, it evolved into Gimnazijski nogometni klub Zrinjski (Gymnasium Football Club Zrinjski). It was named after the historic Croatian noble family Zrinski. Some of the first games they played were against the sports team Osman from Sarajevo: the games ended 0–3 and 2–1. Club activist and player Ivo Ćorić wrote the first reports about the club at that time. He named some of the players: Rudolf Brozović, Bruno and Edo Novak, Marko Suton, Željko and Ante Merdžo, Abid Pehlivanović, Slavko Jukić, Ivan Bošnjak and Karlo Šmit. In 1914, at the outset of World War I, the club was banned. This ban lasted until 1917 when Zrinjski, along with another Croatian sports club from Mostar, Hrvatski radnički omladinski športski klub (HROŠK), formed a new club called "Hercegovac". Some of the HROŠK players were: Jure Zelenika, Nikola Paladžić, Miroslav Prpić, Mirko Vlaho, Ante Pavković and Kažimir Zubac.

In 1922, the original name "Zrinjski" was revived, and the team began competing more seriously. They played against other Mostar teams, like Yugoslavian Sports Club (JŠK), Velež and Vardar, and also teams from all over Herzegovina, Bosnia and Dalmatia. In 1923, Zrinjski won the Mostar Championship with a 1–0 victory over JŠK. The players that played in that game were: Vjekoslav Vrančić, Kazimir Vlaho, Živo Bebek, Rudi Janjušić, Husein H. Omerović, Milivoj Smoljan, Pero Golić, Mijo Miličević, Muhamed Omeragić, August Kučinović and Franjo Štimac. In the 1930s Zrinjski played games in Zagreb, Sarajevo, Banja Luka and even Montenegro. In 1936, Yugoslav authorities did not allow Zrinjski to play in a tournament in Dubrovnik because their jerseys bore Croatian colours. In 1938, Zrinjski won a tournament against Velež, ŠK Sloga and ŠK Makabi. At that time, they also played three-night games, with the lights they borrowed from the local mine. Some of the club presidents from 1905 to 1945 were Miško Mikulić, Drago Turkelj, Jakša Miljković and Blaž Slišković.

=== World War II and ban ===
In 1941, following the Nazi invasion of Yugoslavia, was proclaimed under the name Independent State of Croatia. A football league was also formed, and Zrinjski joined it when it was admitted to FIFA. In the league, Zrinjski played some historic games against Građanski Zagreb.

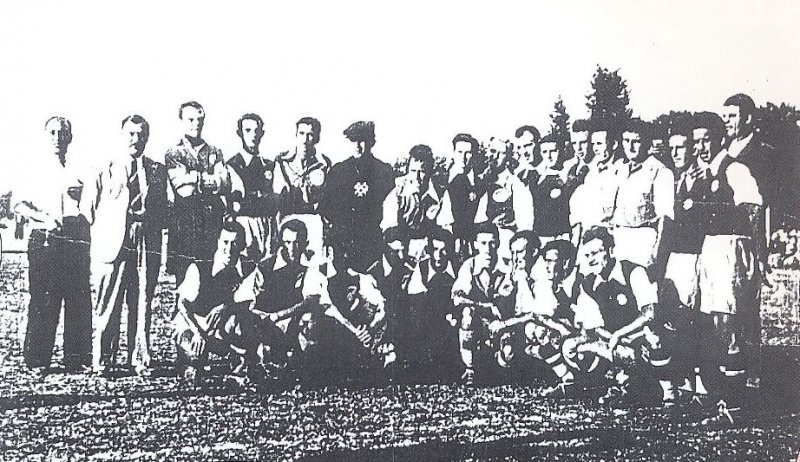
Zrinjski and Građanski Zagreb players together in a picture before a game in the early 1940s

In 1943, Zrinjski played Jedinstvo, winning 2–1, which was probably the last match before the club was banned. By the end of the Second World War, the Independent State of Croatia had been defeated by the Yugoslav Partisans resistance movement. Zrinjski was among the clubs banned in 1945 for being nationalist propaganda tools.

=== Restoration ===
After Bosnia and Herzegovina became an independent state in 1992, Zrinjski was reestablished in Međugorje. Because of the ongoing war, for the first two years, Zrinjski played only friendly games, mostly in Herzegovina and Croatia, but also in Canada and Germany. In 1994, Zrinjski, along with other Croat clubs from Bosnia and Herzegovina, helped create the Herzeg-Bosnia Football Federation. The club participated in its league for seven seasons and consistently ranked among the best teams. Some of the notable players at that time were Blaž Slišković and Slaven Musa, both FK Velež Mostar players before that. In 1998, Zrinjski participated in the first playoffs with teams from Bosniak-ruled parts of Bosnia and Herzegovina. In 2000, the Premier League included both clubs from Bosniak-ruled and Croat-ruled parts of the country for the first time, and Zrinjski was one of the clubs competing in the league and still is today. Clubs from Serb-ruled parts of Bosnia and Herzegovina joined in 2002.

In the summer of 2000, Zrinjski also participated in a UEFA competition for the first time. They played in the Intertoto Cup against the Swedish team Västra Frölunda IF. Zrinjski lost the first game in Sweden 1–0 and led 1–0 after 90 minutes in Mostar. At the start of overtime, Zrinjski scored another goal, securing the result that sent them to the next round. Still, the game ultimately ended in a 3–2 Zrinjski victory, and Vastra Frolunda advanced due to away goals.

=== The new era ===
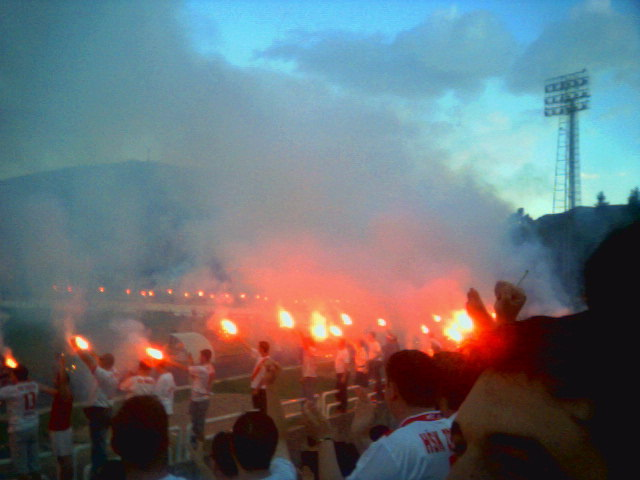
Title celebration in 2005

Before the 2003–04 season, several new board members joined the club, bringing in better sponsors. Their primary goal was to make Zrinjski one of the top clubs in the country by its 100th anniversary in 2005. Zrinjski then took four players on loan from Dinamo Zagreb: Luka Modrić, Marko Janjetović, Ivica Džidić and Davor Landeka. After the season, Džidić and Landeka stayed permanently. Although Zrinjski was nowhere near the top, the base for the next season was created. In the summer of 2004, the club signed some of the best players in the league, such as Zoran Rajović, Dušan Kerkez, Velimir Vidić, and Sulejman Smajić. The team, led by manager Franjo Džidić, won the title easily, with a significant point advantage over runner-up Željezničar. Zoran Rajović was the league's leading scorer.

Many of Zrinjski's star players were on one-year contracts and left the team after the season. As a result, the team did not play well at the beginning of the season and was surprisingly knocked out of the UEFA Champions League first qualifying round by the Luxembourg team F91 Dudelange. Zrinjski won the first game away 1–0 but lost at home after overtime 4–0. Not long after the beginning of the season, Blaž Slišković was appointed as manager.

Zrinjski finished the 2005–06 season in third place, earning a spot in the Intertoto Cup, where Zrinjski knocked out the Maltese team Marsaxlokk (3–0 home, 1–1 away) in the first round and lost to Israel team Maccabi Petah Tikva (1–1 away, 1–3 home) in the second round.

In the 2006–07 season, Zrinjski finished second, earning a UEFA Europa League berth. During the winter break, Zrinjski lost one of its best players Lamine Diarra, who transferred to Beira-Mar, but it signed former star player Zoran Rajović on a free transfer. Zrinjski also signed another former player, an experienced midfielder Mario Ivanković from Brotnjo.

In 2007–08, Zrinjski lost in the first qualifying round to FK Partizan of Serbia, 11–1 on aggregate. However, Partizan was expelled from the competition due to crowd trouble, so Zrinjski progressed to the second round, where they lost 2–1 on aggregate to FK Rabotnički of Macedonia. The domestic campaign saw them finish fourth, but a victory in the Cup of Bosnia and Herzegovina earned them a place in the UEFA Cup once again.

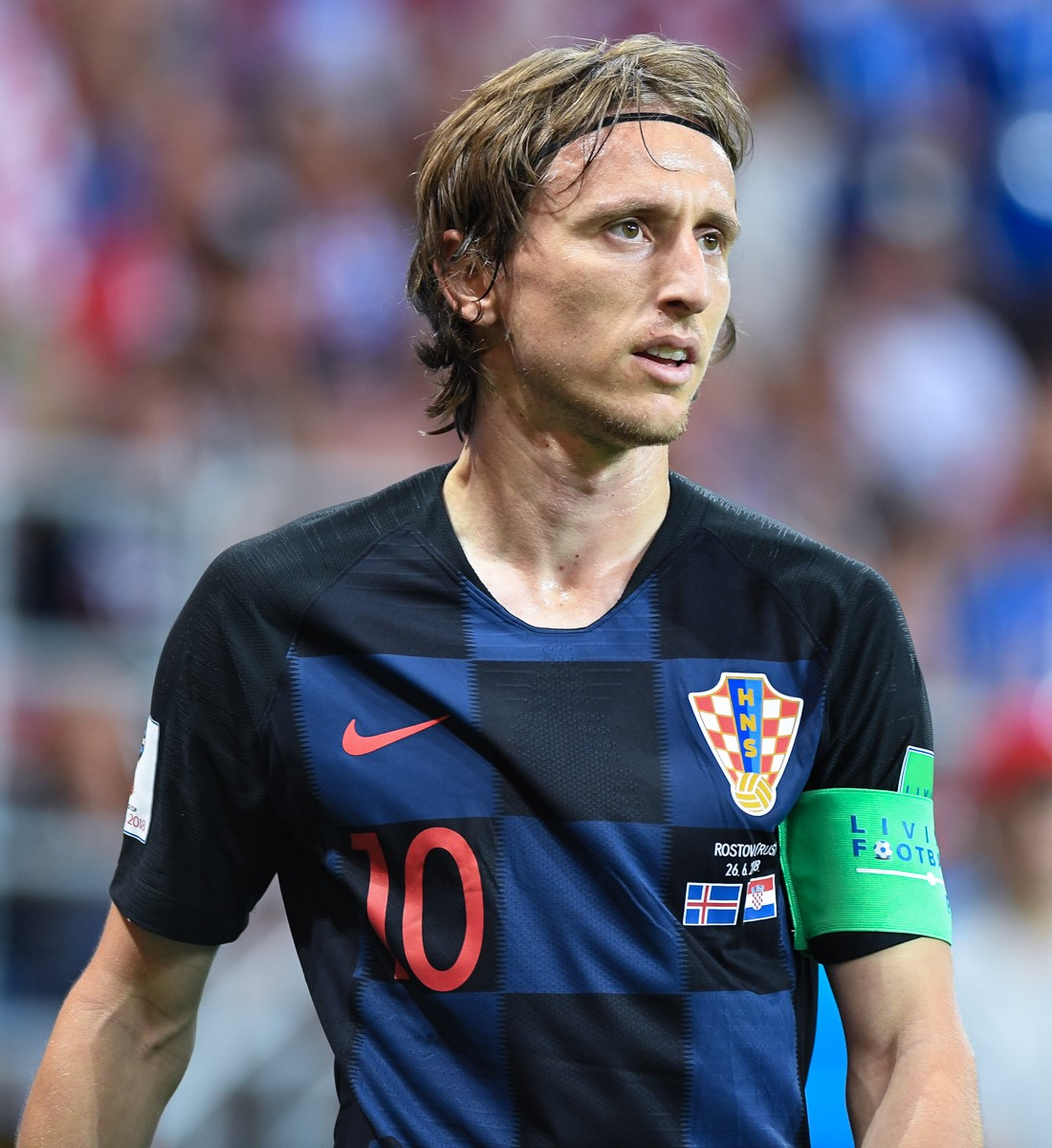
Luka Modrić played for Zrinjski in the 2003–04 season

In the 2008–09 season, Zrinjski managed a 5–1 aggregate with over FC Vaduz in the first qualifying round of the UEFA Cup but lost 3–0 to SC Braga in the next round. They also won the Premier League for the second time, led by talismanic striker Krešimir Kordić, who top scored with 13 league goals.

The league title meant that Zrinjski advanced to the second round of UEFA Champions League qualifying, their second appearance in the competition. Unfortunately, the side lost 1–4 on aggregate to ŠK Slovan Bratislava despite a 1–0 home leg win. A disappointing 2009–10 league season left Zrinjski in fourth place.

Zrinjski's participation in European football lasted longer in the 2010–11 season than in others, with the side beating both FC Tobol and Tre Penne before losing to Odense Boldklub in the third qualifying round of the UEFA Europa League. Zrinjski fell further down the league table and once again managed just a seventh-place finish, meaning the side would not play European football next season. In the 2011–12 season, Zrinjski improved only slightly: a sixth-place finish again meant that the side would not participate in continental football the following season. The 2012–13 season was the worst in almost ten years, with the club slumping to a ninth-place finish. However, they managed to qualify for European football through a strong cup performance, reaching the semi-finals.

During the 2013–14 season, a season-long three-way battle for the title among themselves, NK Široki Brijeg and FK Sarajevo, Zrinjski came out victorious, winning their third-ever Premier League title, their first since 2004–05. The title win in the previous season once again sent Zrinjski to the UEFA Champions League second qualifying stage, where they drew NK Maribor.

From 2015 to 2018, Zrinjski dominated the Premier League, winning three league titles in a row, two under manager Blaž Slišković and one under Vinko Marinović. The club also got better in European competitions, participating in the third qualifying rounds of the UEFA Europa League in the 2018–19, 2019–20 and 2020–21 seasons. In 2018, Zrinjski was eliminated in the third round by Bulgarian club Ludogorets Razgrad, in 2019 by Swedish club Malmö and in 2020 by Cypriot club APOEL. Interestingly enough, in the first two European "campaigns", the club was led by Croatian managers Ante Miše and Hari Vukas respectively. In the third one, Zrinjski was managed by Bosnian manager Mladen Žižović.

Following a lacklustre 2020–21 season, in the following 2021–22 season, the club was crowned league champions for a record seventh time, under manager Sergej Jakirović. Zrinjski managed to retain its league title in the following campaign, four rounds before the end of the season. The club also won the Bosnian Cup that season, winning its first-ever double.

In August 2023, Zrinjski became the first ever club from Bosnia and Herzegovina to reach the group stages of a European club competition after eliminating Icelandic club Breiðablik in the 2023–24 UEFA Europa League third qualifying round, which assured Zrinjski of a group stage spot in the UEFA Europa Conference League as a minimum. After losing to LASK in the Europa League play-off round, Zrinjski dropped into the Conference League group stage, where they were drawn into Group E alongside Aston Villa, AZ and Legia Warsaw. On matchday one, Zrinjski pulled off an astonishing comeback against AZ. Trailing 3–0 at half time, the team made history and came back to win 4–3. This result also meant that they became the first ever Bosnian side to win a game in a UEFA club competition group stage. The team lost their next four games in the group, before ending their European campaign with a home draw against Aston Villa on 14 December 2023.

== Rivalries ==
=== Velež ===
Zrinjski Mostar's main rival is Velež Mostar, the other main football team in Mostar. The highly contested game between both teams is called the Mostar derby. Zrinjski first played against Velež Mostar in the 1920s and 1930s. However, when Zrinjski was banned (1945–1992) for participating in the fascist league, no games between the rival teams were played. During that period, Velež became a successful club in former Yugoslavia, and a majority of Mostarian inhabitants supported it. After Zrinjski's league ban was lifted, the team became one of the essential symbols of the Croatian entity in Mostar, and it was mainly supported by Croats. The rival team, Velež, is supported primarily by local Bosniaks. The Mostar derby is highly contested, just as the Sarajevo derby. On 1 March 2000, Zrinjski and Velež played a friendly game for the first time in over 55 years. The game took place in Sarajevo and ended in a 2–2 draw. The first official game between the two teams was played in the Premier League of BiH at Bijeli Brijeg Stadium on 13 August 2000, and Zrinjski won 2–0.

The two fan groups which support each team are:

- HŠK Zrinjski supporters: Ultras Mostar
- FK Velež supporters: Red Army Mostar

Both fanbases still represent a division along ethnic lines, as the Ultras are almost exclusively Croats and the Red Army is mostly Bosniaks. The ethnic connection between the two fan bases leads to vigorous clashes at the Mostar derby. Furthermore, some extreme groups of the Red Army are left-wing-inspired, while extreme Ultras are right-wing-inspired, which further exacerbates their rivalry.

=== Others ===
Other notable rivals of Zrinjski are Sarajevo clubs Sarajevo and Željezničar. These clubs with a famous history, along with Zrinjski, are favourites for the top of the table almost every season. Another reason for this rivalry is that Mostar is the centre of Herzegovina, while Sarajevo is the centre of Bosnia and the capital of the entire country. There is also a rivalry with Široki Brijeg, the other top team from Herzegovina. This rivalry started during the Herzeg-Bosnia League (1994–2000) and continued in the Premier League. The matches between Široki Brijeg and Zrinjski are often referred to as the "Herzegovina derby."

== Supporters ==
Zrinjski's main supporter group Ultras Mostar

Zrinjski's leading supporter group are called Ultras Mostar. Officially, the Ultras-Zrinjski Fan Club was founded in March 1998, when the Citizens' Associations Act entered into the Registry of Citizens' Associations in the Herzegovina-Neretva Canton, and has existed as an unregistered support group since 1994. They promote all sections of the sports club Zrinjski, but they mostly follow its football department. They got their name in 1998, 6 years after Zrinjski's work was restored. They took the name of the fan-based Ultras Movement in European football. The official song of Ultras, fans of HŠK Zrinjski Mostar, is "Gori brate", and they support their club from the grandstand - Stajanje. The colours used by Ultras on transparencies and boards are black, white and red.

== Stadium ==
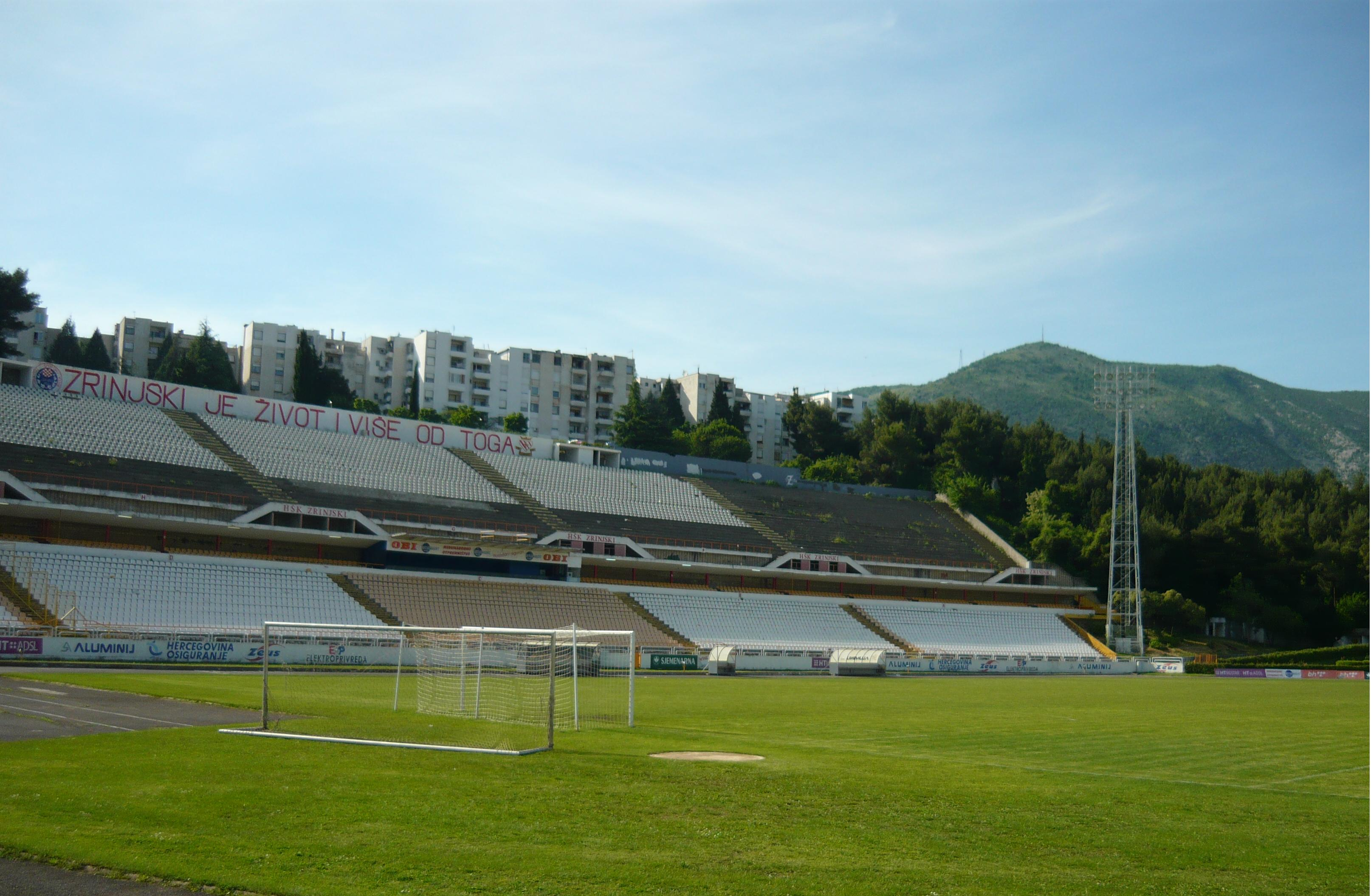
Stadion pod Bijelim Brijegom in 2009

Zrinjski plays its games on Stadion HŠK Zrinjski. The stadium was built in 1958 and was used by city rivals Velež until 1992. The stadium capacity today is 9,000 seats (formerly 25,000 standing), but in the 1970s and 1980s, some games attracted over 35,000 spectators. It was the second-largest stadium in Bosnia and Herzegovina (before plastic seats were added), after Asim Ferhatović Hase Stadium in Sarajevo.

== Honours ==
=== Domestic ===
Type	Competition	Titles	Seasons
Domestic	Premier League of Bosnia and Herzegovina	9	2004–05, 2008–09, 2013–14, 2015–16, 2016–17, 2017–18, 2021–22, 2022–23, 2024–25
Domestic	Bosnia and Herzegovina Cup	4	2007–08, 2022–23, 2023–24, 2025–26
Domestic	Supercup of Bosnia and Herzegovina	2	2024, 2025

- record

=== Doubles ===
- Premier League and National Cup (1): 2022–23

== Players ==
=== Current squad ===
As of 26 September 2026

No.	Pos.	Nation	Player
1	GK	BIH	Matej Bogdan
4	DF	BIH	Hrvoje Barišić
5	MF	CRO	Dan Lagumdžija
6	MF	BIH	Igor Savić
7	FW	CRO	Niko Gajzler
8	MF	CRO	Ivica Vidović (on loan from Celje)
10	MF	CRO	Mario Čuić
11	FW	AUS	Tomi Jurić
12	DF	CRO	Petar Mamić
15	DF	BIH	Karlo Stapić
17	MF	BIH	Antonio Ilić
18	GK	BIH	Goran Karačić
19	DF	CRO	Marko Vranjković
20	MF	CRO	Antonio Ivančić
21	DF	BIH	Viktor Grbić

No.	Pos.	Nation	Player
24	DF	CRO	Toma Palić
25	FW	CRO	Mario Ćuže
26	FW	SRB	Stefan Cvetković
27	DF	SRB	Slobodan Jakovljević (vice-captain)
30	MF	CRO	Neven Đurasek
31	GK	CRO	Zvonimir Šubarić
37	DF	CRO	Darick Kobie Morris
39	FW	BIH	Antonio Arapović
40	DF	BIH	Branko Ćurdo
42	MF	BIH	Marijan Ćavar
44	GK	CRO	Antonio Đaković
77	FW	CRO	Karlo Abramović
80	FW	BIH	Hamza Ljukovac
99	FW	BIH	Nemanja Bilbija (captain)

=== Out on loan ===
Note: Flags indicate national team as defined under FIFA eligibility rules; some limited exceptions apply. Players may hold more than one non-FIFA nationality.

No.	Pos.	Nation	Player
—	DF	CRO	Darko Bašić (at Posušje until 30 June 2027)
—	DF	BIH	Rino Ivanković (at Čapljina until 30 June 2027)
—	DF	BIH	David Karačić (at Jadran Luka Ploče until 30 June 2027)

No.	Pos.	Nation	Player
—	MF	BIH	Mihajlo Ševa (at Laktaši until 30 June 2027)
—	MF	BIH	Roko Šilić (at Jadran Luka Ploče until 31 May 2027)
—	FW	BIH	Borna Filipović (at Posušje until 30 June 2027)

== Personnel ==
=== Coaching staff ===
Position	Staff
Head coach	(Slovenia) Simon Rožman
Assistant coach	(Bosnia and Herzegovina) Dubravko Orlović
Fitness coach	(Bosnia and Herzegovina) Marko Čavka
Goalkeeping coach	(Bosnia and Herzegovina) Igor Melher
Analyst	(Bosnia and Herzegovina) Marin Jovanović
Doctor	(Bosnia and Herzegovina) Zdenko Ostojić
Physiotherapist	(Bosnia and Herzegovina) Branislav Đolo
Physiotherapist	(Bosnia and Herzegovina) Marko Pehar
Physiotherapist	(Bosnia and Herzegovina) Josip Mršić
Gunsmith	(Bosnia and Herzegovina) Dražan Melo

Last updated: 19 June 2026

=== Executives ===
Chairman of the board	(Bosnia and Herzegovina) Denis Lasić
Executive vice-president	(Bosnia and Herzegovina) Danko Šulenta
Executive vice-president	(Israel) Amir Gross Kabiri
Chairman of the Assembly	(Bosnia and Herzegovina) Mladen Margeta
Director	(Bosnia and Herzegovina) Ivan Beus
Ground (capacity and dimensions)	Stadion pod Bijelim Brijegom (9,000 / 105 x 70 m)

=== Managerial history ===
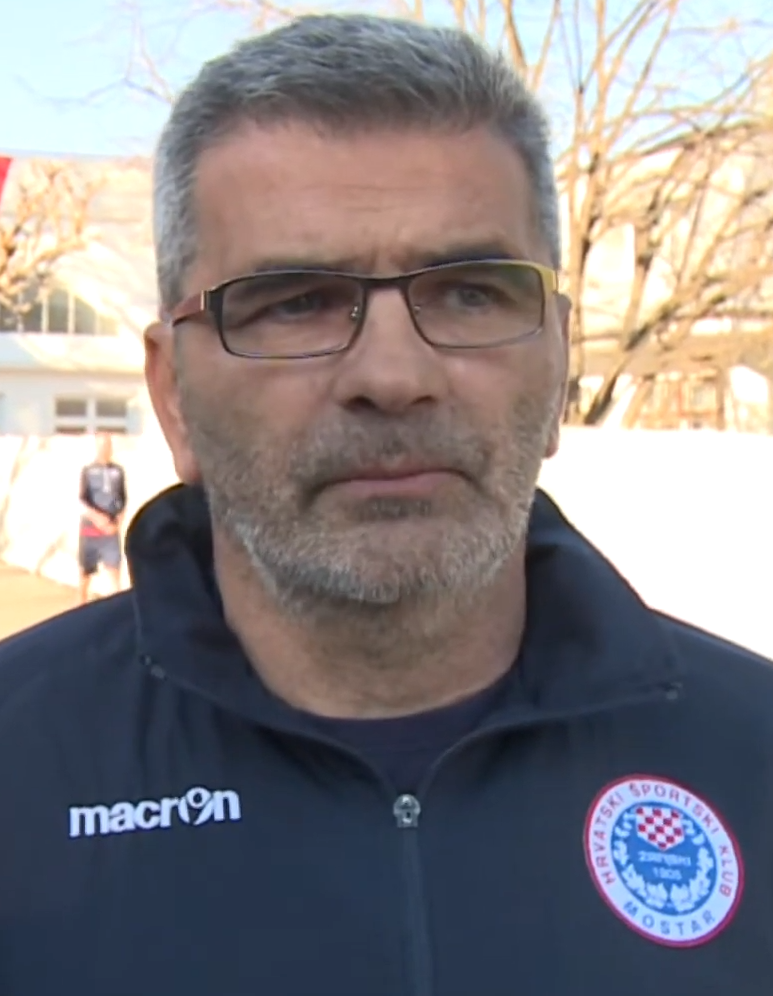
Blaž Slišković won two Bosnian Premier League titles in a row with Zrinjski in the seasons 2016–17 and 2017–18

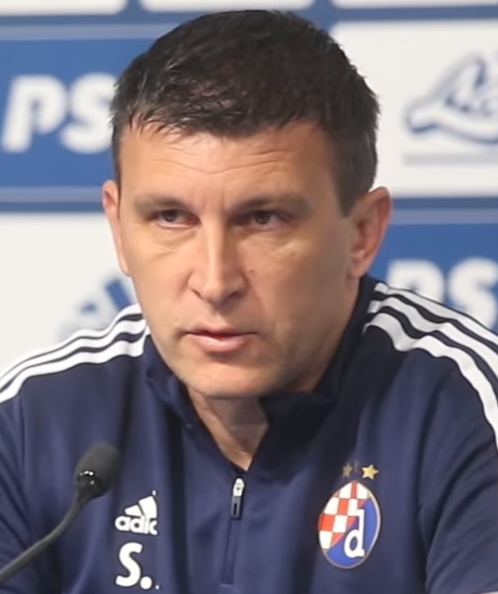
Sergej Jakirović led Zrinjski to a record seventh league title in the 2021–22 season

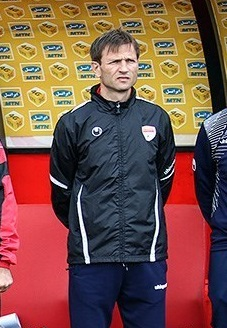
Krunoslav Rendulić won Zrinjski's first ever double in the 2022–23 season and qualified the club to the UEFA Conference League group stage

Dates	Name	Notes
1905–1945	Unknown	
1945–1992	None	Club banned
1994	(Bosnia and Herzegovina) Miroslav Kordić	
1995	(Bosnia and Herzegovina) Jozo Zelenika	
1995	(Bosnia and Herzegovina) Mirko Gašić	
1995–1996	(Bosnia and Herzegovina) Franjo Vladić	
1996	(Bosnia and Herzegovina) Mirko Gašić	
1996	(Bosnia and Herzegovina) Miroslav Kordić	
1997	(Bosnia and Herzegovina) Žarko Barbarić	
1997–1998	(Bosnia and Herzegovina) Franjo Džidić	
1998–1999	(Bosnia and Herzegovina) Blaž Slišković	
1999–2000	(Bosnia and Herzegovina) Dalibor Cvitanović	
2000	(Bosnia and Herzegovina) Vladimir Skočajić	
2001	(Croatia) Vjeran Simunić	
2001–2003	(Bosnia and Herzegovina) Ivica Barbarić	
2003	(Bosnia and Herzegovina) Franjo Džidić	
2003–2004	(Croatia) Stjepan Deverić	
2004–2005	(Bosnia and Herzegovina) Franjo Džidić	
2005–2007	(Bosnia and Herzegovina) Blaž Slišković	
2007–2010	(Bosnia and Herzegovina) Dragan Jović	
2010	(Slovenia) Marijan Bloudek	
2010–2012	(Bosnia and Herzegovina) Slaven Musa	
2012	(Bosnia and Herzegovina) Draženko Bogdan	Caretaker manager
2012–2013	(Bosnia and Herzegovina) (Croatia) Dragan Perić	
2013–2014	(Croatia) Branko Karačić	
2015	(Croatia) Mišo Krstičević	
2015–2016	(Bosnia and Herzegovina) Vinko Marinović	
2017	(Bosnia and Herzegovina) Ivica Barbarić	
2017–2018	(Bosnia and Herzegovina) Blaž Slišković	
2018	(Croatia) Ante Miše	
2018–2019	(Bosnia and Herzegovina) Blaž Slišković	
2019	(Croatia) Hari Vukas	
2019	(Bosnia and Herzegovina) Nenad Gagro	Caretaker manager
2019–2020	(Bosnia and Herzegovina) Mladen Žižović	
2020–2022	(Bosnia and Herzegovina) Sergej Jakirović	
2022–2023	(Croatia) Krunoslav Rendulić	
2023–2024	(Croatia) Mario Ivanković	Caretaker manager
2024	(Montenegro) Željko Petrović	
2024–2025	(Croatia) Mario Ivanković	
2025–2026	(Croatia) Igor Štimac	
2026–present	(Slovenia) Simon Rožman	

== European record ==
As of 30 July 2026

Competition	Played	Won	Drew	Lost	GF	GA	GD	Win%
UEFA Champions League	22	5	7	10	17	32	−15	22.73
UEFA Cup / UEFA Europa League	40	18	10	12	67	55	+12	45.00
UEFA Conference League	29	9	5	15	31	44	−13	31.03
UEFA Intertoto Cup	6	2	2	2	8	7	+1	33.33
Total	97	34	24	39	123	138	−15	35.05

Legend: GF = Goals For. GA = Goals Against. GD = Goal Difference.

=== List of matches ===
Season	Competition	Round	Opponent	Home	Away	Agg.
2000	UEFA Intertoto Cup	1R	(Sweden) Västra Frölunda	2–1	0–1	2–2 (a)
2005–06	UEFA Champions League	1Q	(Luxembourg) Dudelange	0–4 (a.e.t.)	1–0	1–4
2006	UEFA Intertoto Cup	1R	(Malta) Marsaxlokk	3–0	1–1	4–1
2006	UEFA Intertoto Cup	2R	(Israel) Maccabi Petah Tikva	1–3	1–1	2–4
2007–08	UEFA Cup	1Q	(Serbia) Partizan	1–6^{1}	0–5	1–11
2007–08	UEFA Cup	2Q	(North Macedonia) Rabotnički	1–2	0–0	1–2
2008–09	UEFA Cup	1Q	(Liechtenstein) Vaduz	3–0	2–1	5–1
2008–09	UEFA Cup	2Q	(Portugal) Braga	0–2	0–1	0–3
2009–10	UEFA Champions League	2Q	(Slovakia) Slovan Bratislava	1–0	0–4	1–4
2010–11	UEFA Europa League	1Q	(Kazakhstan) Tobol	2–1	2–1	4–2
2010–11	UEFA Europa League	2Q	(San Marino) Tre Penne	4–1	9–2	13–3
2010–11	UEFA Europa League	3Q	(Denmark) Odense	0–0	3–5	3–5
2013–14	UEFA Europa League	1Q	(Andorra) UE Santa Coloma	1–0	3–1	4–1
2013–14	UEFA Europa League	2Q	(Bulgaria) Botev Plovdiv	1–1	0–2	1–3
2014–15	UEFA Champions League	2Q	(Slovenia) Maribor	0–0	0–2	0–2
2015–16	UEFA Europa League	1Q	(Armenia) Shirak	2–1	0–2	2–3
2016–17	UEFA Champions League	2Q	(Poland) Legia Warsaw	1–1	0–2	1–3
2017–18	UEFA Champions League	2Q	(Slovenia) Maribor	1–2	1–1	2–3
2018–19	UEFA Champions League	1Q	(Slovakia) Spartak Trnava	1–1	0–1	1–2
2018–19	UEFA Europa League	2Q	(Malta) Valletta	1–1	2–1	3–2
2018–19	UEFA Europa League	3Q	(Bulgaria) Ludogorets Razgrad	1–1	0–1	1–2
2019–20	UEFA Europa League	1Q	(North Macedonia) Akademija Pandev	3–0	3–0	6–0
2019–20	UEFA Europa League	2Q	(Netherlands) Utrecht	2–1	1–1	3–2
2019–20	UEFA Europa League	3Q	(Sweden) Malmö	1–0	0–3	1–3
2020–21	UEFA Europa League	1Q	(Luxembourg) Differdange 03	3–0	—N/a	—N/a
2020–21	UEFA Europa League	2Q	(Slovenia) Olimpija Ljubljana	—N/a	3–2 (a.e.t.)	—N/a
2020–21	UEFA Europa League	3Q	(Cyprus) APOEL	—N/a	2–2 (2–4 p)	—N/a
2022–23	UEFA Champions League	1Q	(Moldova) Sheriff Tiraspol	0–0	0–1	0–1
2022–23	UEFA Europa Conference League	2Q	(Albania) Tirana	3–2	1–0	4–2
2022–23	UEFA Europa Conference League	3Q	(Kazakhstan) Tobol	1–0	1–1	2–1
2022–23	UEFA Europa Conference League	PO	(Slovakia) Slovan Bratislava	1–0	1–2 (a.e.t.)	2–2 (5–6 p)
2023–24	UEFA Champions League	1Q	(Armenia) Urartu	2–3 (a.e.t.)	1–0	3–3 (4–3 p)
2023–24	UEFA Champions League	2Q	(Slovakia) Slovan Bratislava	0–1	2–2	2–3
2023–24	UEFA Europa League	3Q	(Iceland) Breiðablik	6–2	0–1	6–3
2023–24	UEFA Europa League	PO	(Austria) LASK	1–1	1–2	2–3
2023–24	UEFA Europa Conference League	GS	(Netherlands) AZ	4–3	0–1	4th out of 4
2023–24	UEFA Europa Conference League	GS	(England) Aston Villa	1–1	0–1	4th out of 4
2023–24	UEFA Europa Conference League	GS	(Poland) Legia Warsaw	1–2	0–2	4th out of 4
2024–25	UEFA Conference League	2Q	(Slovenia) Bravo	0–1	3–1	3–2
2024–25	UEFA Conference League	3Q	(Bulgaria) Botev Plovdiv	2–0	1–2	3–2
2024–25	UEFA Conference League	PO	(Portugal) Vitória de Guimarães	0–4	0–3	0–7
2025–26	UEFA Champions League	1Q	(San Marino) Virtus	2–1	2–0	4−1
2025–26	UEFA Champions League	2Q	(Slovakia) Slovan Bratislava	2–2	0–4	2–6
2025–26	UEFA Europa League	3Q	(Iceland) Breiðablik	1–1	2–1	3–2
2025–26	UEFA Europa League	PO	(Netherlands) Utrecht	0–2	0–0	0–2
2025–26	UEFA Conference League	LP	(Gibraltar) Lincoln Red Imps	5–0	—N/a	23rd out of 36
2025–26	UEFA Conference League	LP	(Germany) Mainz 05	—N/a	0–1	23rd out of 36
2025–26	UEFA Conference League	LP	(Ukraine) Dynamo Kyiv	—N/a	0–6	23rd out of 36
2025–26	UEFA Conference League	LP	(Sweden) BK Häcken	2–1	—N/a	23rd out of 36
2025–26	UEFA Conference League	LP	(Poland) Raków Częstochowa	—N/a	0–1	23rd out of 36
2025–26	UEFA Conference League	LP	(Austria) Rapid Wien	1–1	—N/a	23rd out of 36
2025–26	UEFA Conference League	KPO	(England) Crystal Palace	1–1	0–2	1–3
2026–27	UEFA Conference League	2Q	(Iceland) Valur	2–2	0–1	2–3

^{1} UEFA expelled Partizan from the 2007–08 UEFA Cup due to crowd trouble at their away tie in Mostar, which forced the match to be interrupted for 10 minutes. UEFA adjudged travelling Partizan fans to have been the culprits of the trouble, but Partizan were allowed to play the return leg while the appeal was being processed. However, Partizan's appeal was rejected so Zrinjski Mostar qualified.

== Club ranking ==
=== UEFA coefficient ===
Rank	Team	Points
136	(Netherlands) Twente	13.585
137	(Netherlands) Vitesse	13.500
138	(Gibraltar) Lincoln Red Imps	13.500
139	(Bosnia and Herzegovina) Zrinjski	13.250
140	(Bosnia and Herzegovina) Borac	13.125
141	(Belgium) Cercle Brugge	12.750
142	(Latvia) RFS	12.500

As of 30 May 2026

Source: UEFA.com

== Seasons ==
Season	League									Cup	European competitions		Top goalscorer	
Season	Division	P	W	D	L	F	A	Pts	Pos	Cup	European competitions		Player	Goals
First League of Herzeg-Bosnia
1994	Div 1 - South	7	6	0	1	32	4	12	2nd				Mario Ivanković; Dario Šoše; Tihomir Bogdan	5
1994	Final Play-off	2	0	1	1	0	1	—	RU				Mario Ivanković; Dario Šoše; Tihomir Bogdan	5
1994–95	Div 1 - South	20	6	3	11	13	29	21	9th				Josip Jurković	6
1995–96	Div 1 - South	14	8	2	4	23	16	26	2nd				Zoran Prskalo	7
1995–96	Play-off	2	0	1	1	2	3	—	QF				Zoran Prskalo	7
1996–97	Div 1	30	14	6	10	39	27	48	4th				Elvis Ćorić	8
1997–98	Div 1	30	19	7	4	72	21	64	2nd				Mario Ivanković	24
1997–98	First League Play-off	2	0	0	2	1	5	0	5th				Mario Ivanković	24
1998–99	Div 1	26	16	4	6	44	21	52	3rd	R2			Renato Marković	8
1999–00	Div 1	26	12	7	7	45	30	43	6th	SF			Dejan Džepina; Berislav Miloš	9
Premier League of Bosnia and Herzegovina
2000–01	Premier League	42	19	6	17	65	54	63	13th	R2	Intertoto Cup	R1	Krešimir Kordić; Leon Buhić	13
2001–02	Premier League	30	13	7	10	35	39	46	5th	R1			Armando Marenzzi	9
2002–03	Premier League	38	17	2	19	46	65	53	11th	SF			Želimir Terkeš	14
2003–04	Premier League	30	11	5	14	40	47	38	11th	R1			Luka Modrić	8
2004–05	Premier League	30	19	4	7	56	30	61	1st	SF			Zoran Rajović	18
2005–06	Premier League	30	17	3	10	47	29	54	3rd	R2	Champions League	QR1	Krešimir Kordić	8
2006–07	Premier League	30	17	4	9	67	40	54	2nd	R1	Intertoto Cup	R2	Krešimir Kordić	11
2007–08	Premier League	30	15	4	11	46	27	49	4th	W	UEFA Cup	QR2	Matija Matko	13
2008–09	Premier League	30	18	3	9	50	37	57	1st	SF	UEFA Cup	QR2	Krešimir Kordić	17
2009–10	Premier League	30	15	6	9	46	33	51	4th	SF	Champions League	QR2	Krešimir Kordić	16
2010–11	Premier League	30	13	3	14	41	39	42	7th	QF	Europa League	QR3	Ivan Lendrić	20
2011–12	Premier League	30	12	9	9	47	41	45	6th	R2			Lazar Marjanović	10
2012–13	Premier League	30	11	6	13	26	42	39	9th	SF			Igor Aničić	7
2013–14	Premier League	30	18	7	5	56	21	61	1st	SF	Europa League	QR2	Ivan Crnov	13
2014–15	Premier League	30	16	11	3	46	13	59	3rd	SF	Champions League	QR2	Stevo Nikolić	15
2015–16	Premier League	30	21	6	3	52	17	69	1st	R1	Europa League	QR1	Jasmin Mešanović	12
2016–17	Premier League	32	18	10	4	54	25	64	1st	QF	Champions League	QR2	Nemanja Bilbija	12
2017–18	Premier League	32	21	6	5	58	30	69	1st	R1	Champions League	QR2	Miloš Filipović	16
2018–19	Premier League	33	19	8	6	46	22	65	2nd	SF	Champions League Europa League	QR1 QR3	Nemanja Bilbija	16
2019–20 (Note: 2019–20 Premier League of Bosnia and Herzegovina suspended in March 2020 due to the COVID-19 pandemic in Bosnia and Herzegovina; season curtailed and final standings (including Sarajevo as champions) declared by a points-per-game ratio on 1 June 2020.)	Premier League	22	11	5	6	30	12	38	3rd	SF	Europa League	QR3	Ivan Lendrić; Miljan Govedarica	6
2020–21	Premier League	33	18	5	10	50	30	59	5th	QF	Europa League	QR3	Nemanja Bilbija	21
2021–22	Premier League	33	26	6	1	74	14	84	1st	R2			Nemanja Bilbija	34
2022–23	Premier League	33	25	3	5	66	21	78	1st	W	Champions League Europa Conference League	QR1 PO	Nemanja Bilbija	31
2023–24	Premier League	33	24	4	5	76	27	76	2nd	W	Champions League Europa League Europa Conference League	QR2 PO GS	Nemanja Bilbija	29
2024–25	Premier League	33	26	4	3	74	17	82	1st	QF	Conference League	PO	Nardin Mulahusejnović	16
2025–26	Premier League	36	21	8	7	48	25	71	2nd	W	Champions League Europa League Conference League	QR2 PO KPO	Nemanja Bilbija	23

Key
League: P = Matches played; W = Matches won; D = Matches drawn; L = Matches lost; F = Goals for; A = Goals against; Pts = Points won; Pos = Final position;
Cup / Europe: PR = Preliminary round; QR = Qualifying round; R1 = First round; R2 = Second round; Group = Group stage; QF = Quarter-final; SF = Semi-final; RU = Runner-up; W = Competition won;

== Popular culture ==
On 15 July 2024, a documentary Hrvatski športski klub Zrinjski – Priča o ponosu ("Croatian sports club Zrinjski – A story of pride") premiered with former player Luka Modrić as a special guest.
