= Stadion pod Bijelim Brijegom =

Multi-purpose stadium in Mostar, Bosnia and Herzegovina

Bijeli Brijeg Stadium
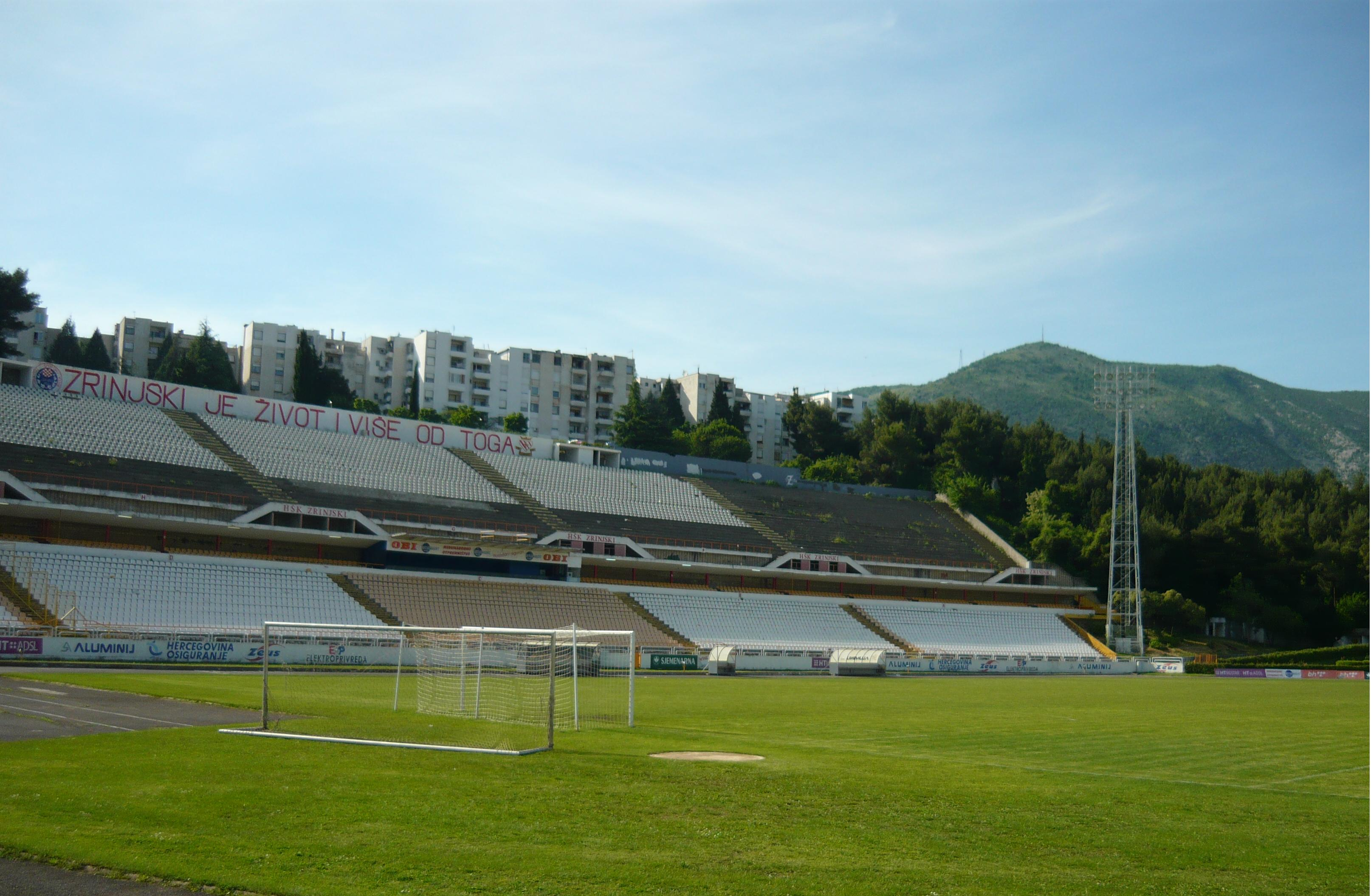
- UEFA
- Interactive map of Bijeli Brijeg Stadium
- Full name: Stadion pod Bijelim Brijegom
- Location: Mostar, Bosnia and Herzegovina
- Coordinates: 43°20′44″N 17°47′43″E
- Owner: City of Mostar
- Operator: HŠK Zrinjski Mostar (109-year concession since 2000)
- Capacity: 7,255; 13,000 (planned under renovation)
- Surface: Hybrid grass
- Scoreboard: LED
- Field size: 105 m × 70 m
- Public transit: Mostar Bus or Taxi

Construction
- Groundbreaking: 1947
- Built: 1956–1958
- Opened: 7 September 1958 (68 years ago)
- Renovated: 2023–2024
- Cost: YUD140 million (1958)

Tenants
- FK Velež Mostar (1958–1992); HŠK Zrinjski Mostar (1992–present)

Website
- hskzrinjski.ba/en/stadion/

Stadion pod Bijelim Brijegom (English: Bijeli Brijeg Stadium), also known as HŠK Zrinjski Stadium, is an association football stadium, located in the city of Mostar, Bosnia and Herzegovina. The venue is the home stadium of HŠK Zrinjski Mostar. Today, it has a capacity of 7,255 seats. Currently, the stadium is being renovated, with a new modern stand with 4,000 seats.

== Location ==
The stadium is situated in the city's center, in the neighborhood of Bijeli Brijeg, on the west bank of the Neretva river.

== Stadium operator ==
In 2000, the legal status and operational control of the Stadion pod Bijelim brijegom underwent a shift when the Municipality of Mostar South-West, one of the six temporary municipalities established during the city’s post-war administrative division, granted a 109-year concession of the entire stadium complex to HŠK Zrinjski Mostar. Signed by local authorities on the basis of promoting municipal sports infrastructure, the long-term lease contract effectively transferred all management, commercial rights, and maintenance obligations to the club until the year 2109.

Despite the controversy surrounding its origins, the 109-year concession contract serves as the official legal baseline recognized by the Football Association of Bosnia and Herzegovina (N/FSBiH) and UEFA. The document satisfies international "tenure of stadium" licensing criteria, granting Zrinjski the institutional security required to independently fund major long-term infrastructure overhauls, such as the reconstruction of the eastern stand.

== History ==
The stadium was built in 1958 with the public subsidies, and volunteering construction works by all denizens of Mostar, particularly students, and it served as the home ground of Velež Mostar during SFR Yugoslavia era. During the Bosnian War, between 1992 and 1995, and in particular subsequent incitement of Croat-Bosniak hostilities, the city of Mostar was effectively split to two parts, western (Croat) and eastern (Bosniak), divided around the river Neretva and the city boulevard. The stadium sustained heavy damage during the war, while conflicting ideologies and interests were conveyed from the war times into the post-war era, evidenced in continuous and steady political divisiveness in the city of Mostar, among other, in issues of territorial and ownership disputes. Such political ambiance showed in the forced eviction of FK Velež Mostar from its traditional home-ground of stadium Pod Bijelim Brijegom, and subsequent political and public disputes over stadium usurpation by another club, emerging in the city at the beginning of the war in 1992, namely HŠK Zrinjski Mostar, one of three city's ethno-national football organizations banned by the former Yugoslav government immediately after the World War II. From that moment onward stadium serves solely as the home ground of Zrinjski Mostar.

FK Velež Mostar used stadium Pod Bijelim Brijegom from the time it was built until 1992, through the club's glory days, when they emerged triumphant from their campaigns in the 1981 and 1986 Yugoslav Cups competition, and before that when the club also reached the quarter-final stage of the 1974–75 UEFA Cup. People around Velež Mostar club, supporters, as well as aficionados of this cult club around former Yugoslavia, public figures, including number of Croatian intellectuals, continuously advocate for Velež's return to its original stadium, however, so far these calls fall on deaf ears with the city's administration, who often citing political and security issues to continue blocking of Velež's return. The club currently plays at the Rođeni Stadium which was built in 1995.

== Importance ==
Bijeli Brijeg is the fourth largest stadium in Bosnia and Herzegovina, after Koševo stadium in Sarajevo. The club HŠK Zrinjski administration changed the stadium name into Stadion HŠK Zrinjski (English: HSK Zrinjski Stadium) and registered it with the Football Federation of Bosnia and Herzegovina for the club's games under the association's auspices.

== Gallery ==
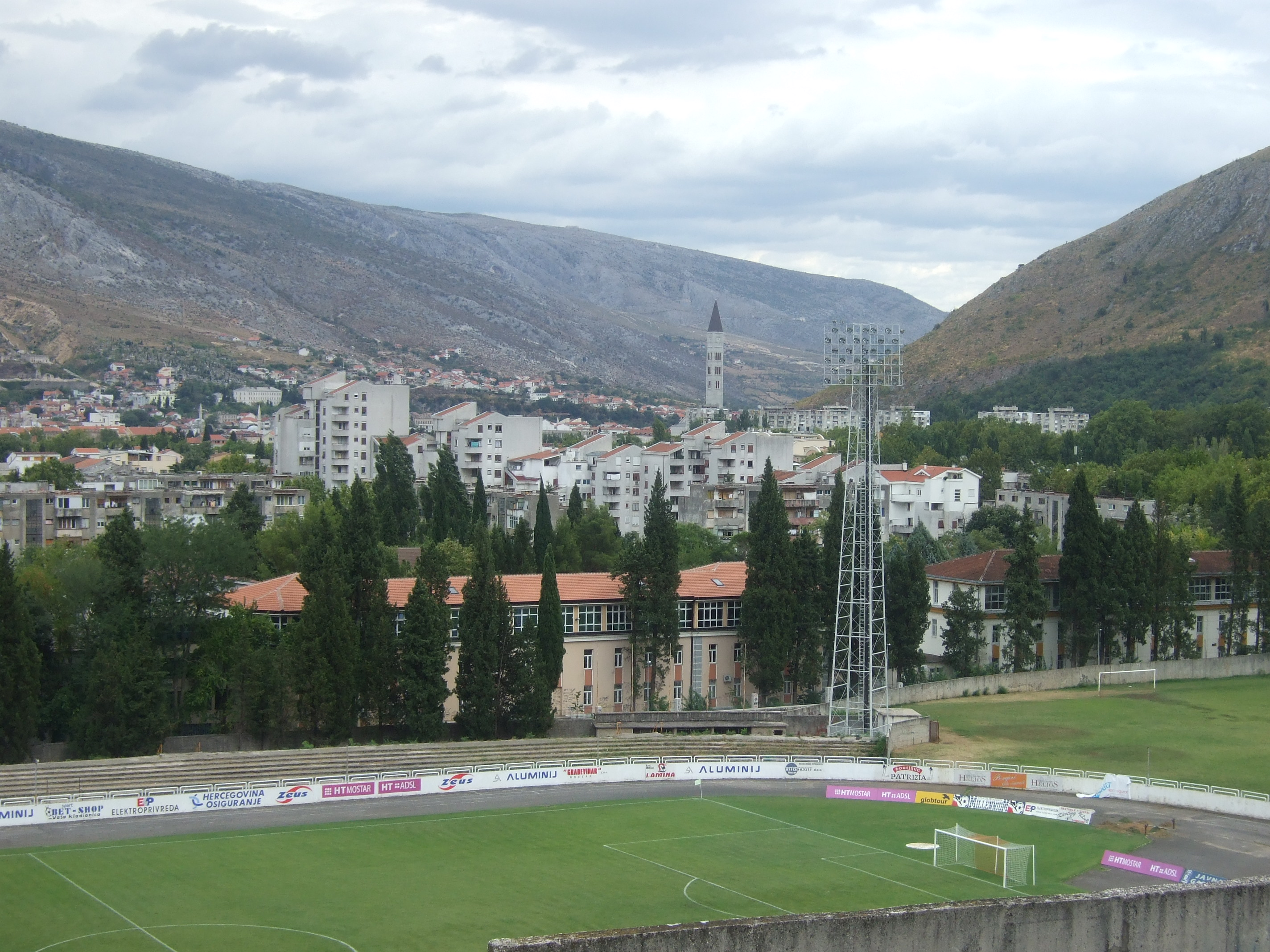
View onto field and central Mostar

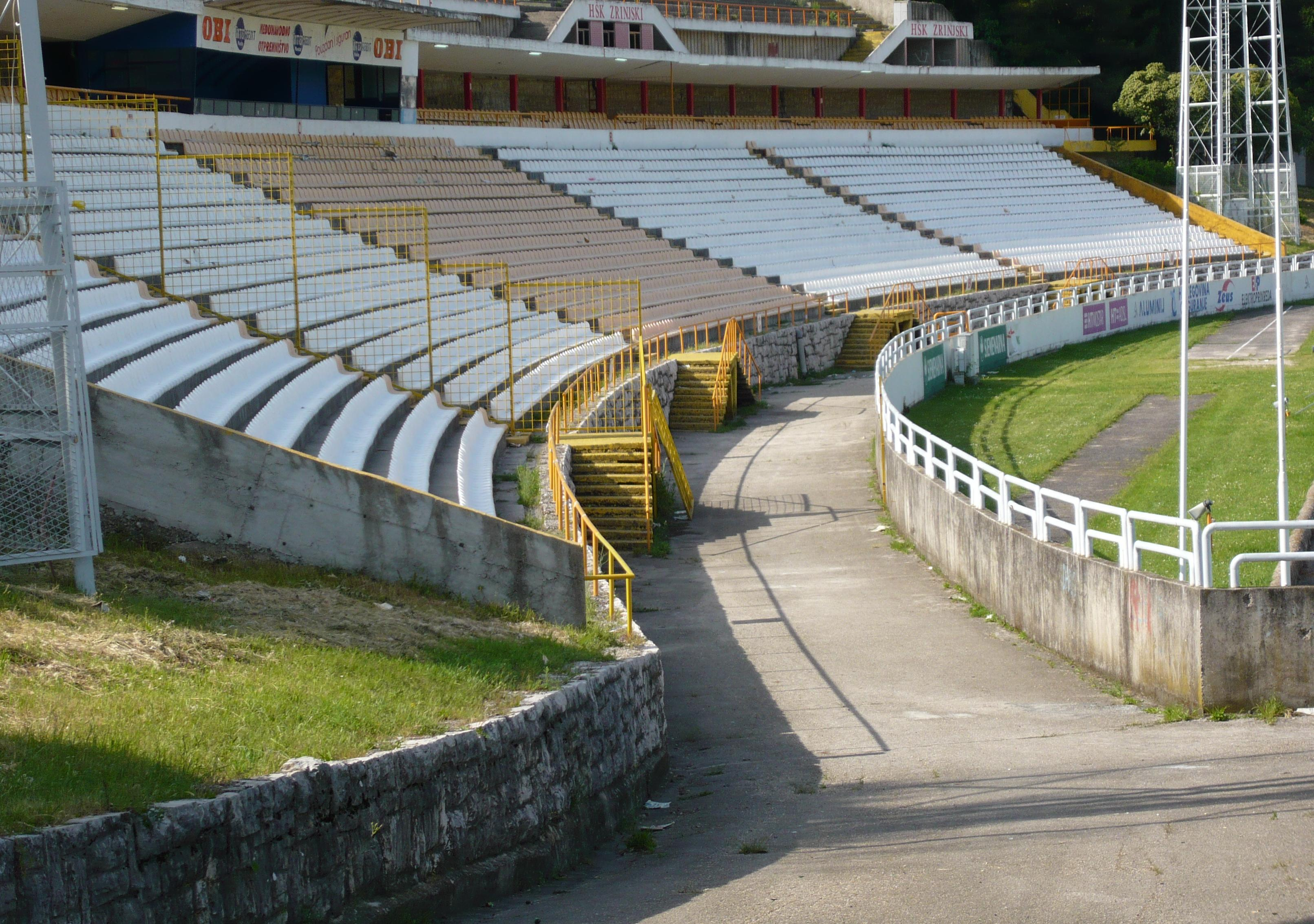
Lower western stands of stadium

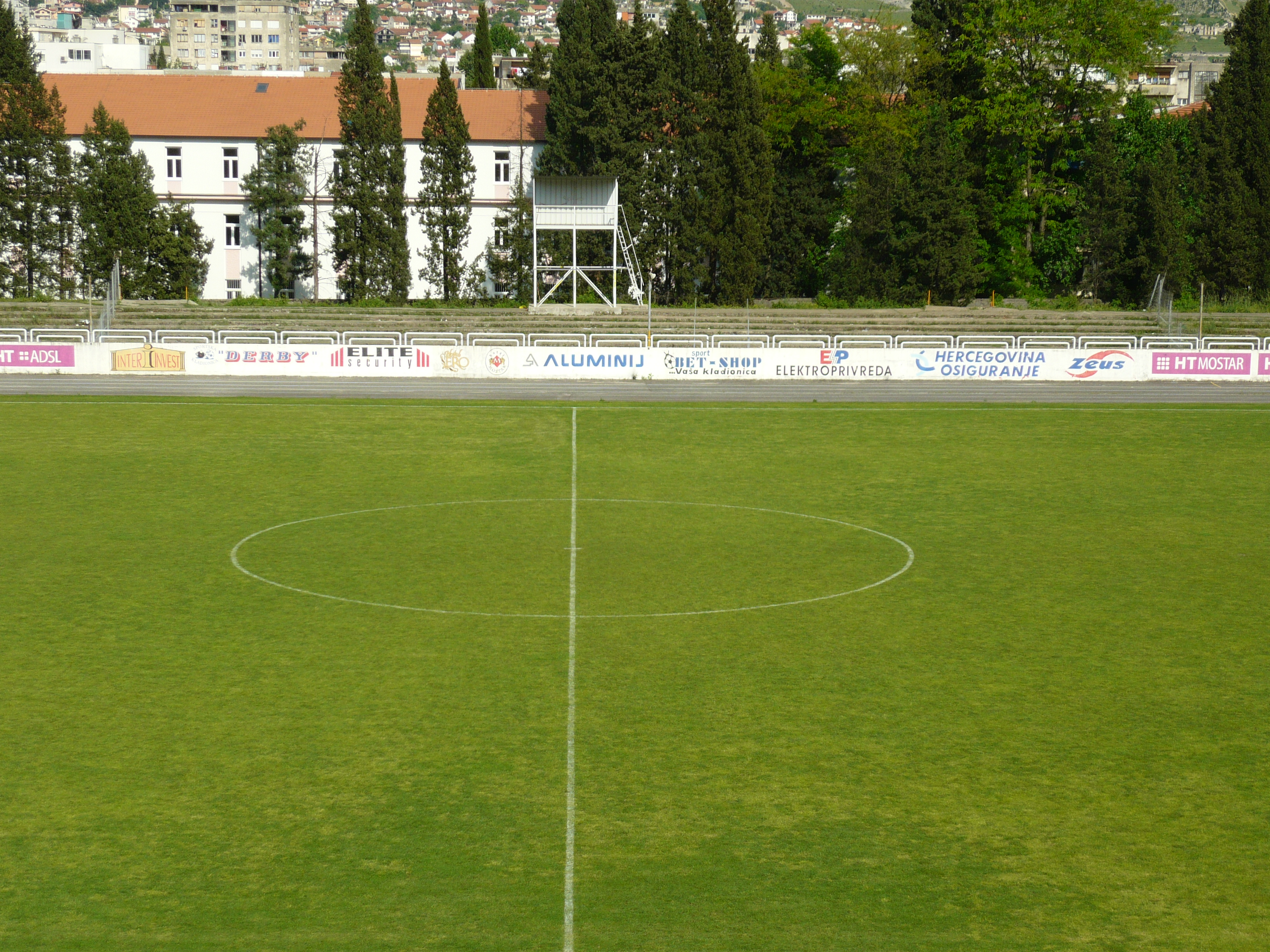
Pitch and eastern stands (also known as Standing - Croatian: Stajanje)

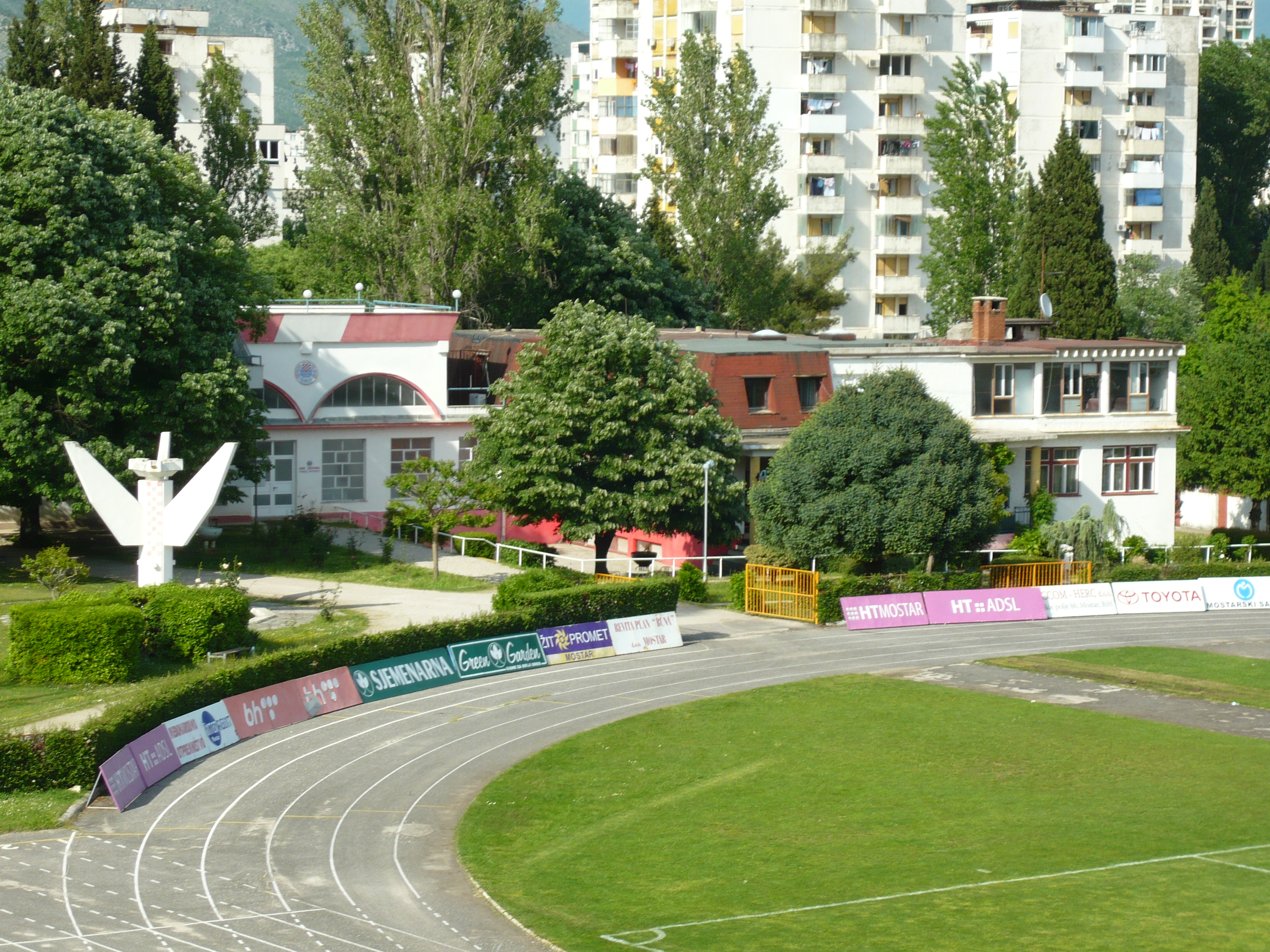
Building of board HŠK Zrinjski Mostar
