= 2014–15 FK Sarajevo season =

Sarajevo
2014–15 season
- Sporting director: Abdulah Ibraković
- Chairman: Edis Kusturica
- Manager: Dženan Uščuplić; Meho Kodro; Dženan Uščuplić
- Stadium: Asim Ferhatović Hase Stadium
- Premier League BiH: Winners
- Cup of BiH: Quarter–finals
- UEFA Europa League: Play-off round
- Top goalscorer: League: Krste Velkoski (11); All: Krste Velkoski (14)
- Highest home attendance: 29,000 vs Borussia Mönchengladbach (21 August 2014)
- Lowest home attendance: 600 vs Olimpic (20 September 2014)
- Average home league attendance: 6,867
- Biggest win: Sarajevo 5–0 Radnik (25 October 2014)
- Biggest defeat: Borussia Mönchengladbach 7–0 Sarajevo (28 August 2014)

The 2014–15 Sarajevo season was the club's 66th season in history, and their 21st consecutive season in the top flight of Bosnian football, the Premier League of BiH. Besides competing in the Premier League, the team competed in the National Cup and the qualifications for UEFA Europa League.

== Squad information ==
=== First-team squad ===
Note: Flags indicate national team as defined under FIFA eligibility rules; some limited exceptions apply. Players may hold more than one non-FIFA nationality.

No.	Pos.	Nation	Player
1	GK	BIH	Emir Plakalo
2	GK	CRO	Matej Delač (on loan from Chelsea)
2	MF	SRB	Miroljub Kostić
3	DF	SRB	Radoš Protić
4	MF	BIH	Edin Rustemović
4	DF	BIH	Haris Muharemović
5	DF	CRO	Mario Barić
6	DF	BIH	Adnan Kovačević
7	MF	SRB	Miloš Stojčev
9	FW	BIH	Ševko Okić
10	MF	BIH	Mehmed Alispahić
11	FW	MKD	Krste Velkoski
13	MF	BIH	Ognjen Todorović
14	DF	SRB	Ivan Tatomirović (captain)
15	DF	BIH	Advan Kadušić
15	DF	MKD	Risto Mitrevski
16	DF	BIH	Marko Mihojević
17	MF	BIH	Haris Duljević
18	MF	BIH	Dario Purić
19	GK	BIH	Dejan Bandović (captain)

No.	Pos.	Nation	Player
20	MF	BIH	Nemanja Anđušić
21	MF	SRB	Irfan Vusljanin
21	FW	CRO	Leon Benko
22	MF	BIH	Amar Burović
23	DF	BIH	Džemal Berberović (captain)
27	FW	BIH	Almir Aganspahić
29	DF	BIH	Amer Dupovac (captain)
30	GK	CRO	Marko Ivkić
32	GK	BIH	Senedin Oštraković
50	MF	BIH	Faris Handžić
55	DF	SYR	Ahmad Kalasi
59	MF	BIH	Gojko Cimirot
69	FW	BIH	Tarik Handžić
77	DF	BIH	Bojan Puzigaća
80	FW	BIH	Amer Bekić
88	MF	BIH	Samir Radovac
97	MF	BIH	Elvedin Herić
99	MF	CIV	Germain Kouadio
99	FW	BIH	Nemanja Bilbija

=== Technical Staff ===
As of 10 October 2014, the staff includes:

Current staff
- Manager: (Bosnia and Herzegovina) Dženan Uščuplić, (previously, Meho Kodro)
- Assistant Manager: (Bosnia and Herzegovina) Emir Tufek
- Goalkeeping Coach: Ibro Hodžić
- Fitness Coach: Almir Seferović
- Team Manager: Dario Pavlović
- TMS Manager: Adnan Redžepagić
- Scout: Ermin Avdić
- Coordinator of the Medical Team: Dr. Reuf Karabeg
- Doctor: Dr. Adnan Hadžimuratović
- Doctor: Dr. Senad Maksić
- Doctor: Dr. Dževad Vrabac
- Doctor: Dr. Adnan Zećo
- Senior Physiotherapist: Ismar Hadžibajrić
- Physiotherapist: Mirza Marevac
- Equipment manager: Salem Mršo
- Equipment manager: Nermin Huskić

== Transfers ==
=== In ===
Date	Pos.	Player	From	Fee	Ref.
31 May 2014	MF	(Serbia) Miroljub Kostić	(Slovenia) Olimpija Ljubljana	Free transfer	
31 May 2014	DF	(North Macedonia) Risto Mitrevski	(North Macedonia) Metalurg Skopje	Undisclosed	
1 June 2014	FW	(Bosnia and Herzegovina) Ševko Okić	(Bosnia and Herzegovina) Velež Mostar	Free transfer	
22 June 2014	MF	(Bosnia and Herzegovina) Haris Duljević	(Bosnia and Herzegovina) Olimpic	Free transfer	
27 June 2014	DF	(Bosnia and Herzegovina) Džemal Berberović	(Bulgaria) Litex Lovech	Free transfer	
5 July 2014	DF	(Serbia) Radoš Protić	(Serbia) Novi Pazar	Undisclosed	
6 August 2014	DF	(Syria) Ahmad Kalasi	(Syria) Al-Shorta	Undisclosed	
20 August 2014	GK	(Croatia) Marko Ivkić	(Switzerland) Staad	Undisclosed	
29 August 2014	FW	(Bosnia and Herzegovina) Amer Bekić	(Bosnia and Herzegovina) Zrinjski Mostar	Free transfer	
15 September 2014	FW	(Croatia) Leon Benko	(China) Dalian Pro	Free transfer	
1 December 2014	MF	(Bosnia and Herzegovina) Edin Rustemović	(Bosnia and Herzegovina) Drina Zvornik	Free transfer	
12 January 2015	MF	(Bosnia and Herzegovina) Mehmed Alispahić	(Croatia) Rijeka	Free transfer	
23 February 2015	GK	(Bosnia and Herzegovina) Senedin Oštraković	(Bosnia and Herzegovina) Olimpic	Free transfer	

=== Out ===
Date	Pos.	Player	To	Fee	Ref.
4 June 2014	MF	(Bosnia and Herzegovina) Amer Osmanagić	(Bosnia and Herzegovina) Čelik Zenica	End of contract	
5 June 2014	DF	(Bosnia and Herzegovina) Vule Trivunović	Retired		
19 June 2014	DF	(Croatia) Mario Tadejević	Free agent	End of contract	
1 July 2014	MF	(Bosnia and Herzegovina) Muhamed Džakmić	Retired		
1 July 2014	MF	(Bosnia and Herzegovina) Anid Travančić	Free agent	Contract termination	
5 August 2014	MF	(Serbia) Irfan Vusljanin	(Serbia) Radnički 1923	Contract termination	
26 November 2014	MF	(Bosnia and Herzegovina) Ognjen Todorović	(Bosnia and Herzegovina) Zrinjski Mostar	End of contract	
29 January 2015	DF	(Bosnia and Herzegovina) Alija Čulov	(Bosnia and Herzegovina) Bosna Visoko	Contract termination	
4 February 2015	MF	(Bosnia and Herzegovina) Faris Handžić	(Belgium) Westerlo	€15,000	
12 February 2015	DF	(Bosnia and Herzegovina) Amer Dupovac	(Moldova) Sheriff Tiraspol	€200,000	
Total				€215,000	

=== Loans in ===
Start date	End date	Pos.	Player	From	Ref.
4 March 2015	End of season	GK	(Croatia) Matej Delač	(England) Chelsea	

=== Loans out ===
Start date	End date	Pos.	Player	To	Ref.
10 July 2014	End of season	DF	(Croatia) Andria Petrović	(Bosnia and Herzegovina) Vitez	
1 August 2014	End of season	MF	(Bosnia and Herzegovina) Haris Muharemović	(Bosnia and Herzegovina) Bosna Visoko	
1 August 2014	End of season	FW	(Bosnia and Herzegovina) Alem Plakalo	(Bosnia and Herzegovina) Bosna Visoko	
1 August 2014	31 December 2014	DF	(Bosnia and Herzegovina) Alija Čulov	(Bosnia and Herzegovina) Bosna Visoko	
14 August 2014	End of season	MF	(Bosnia and Herzegovina) Adnan Hrelja	(Bosnia and Herzegovina) Mladost Doboj Kakanj	
25 January 2015	End of season	MF	(Serbia) Miroljub Kostić	(Serbia) Novi Pazar	
2 February 2015	End of season	GK	(Croatia) Marko Ivkić	(Bosnia and Herzegovina) Bratstvo Gračanica	
5 February 2015	End of season	DF	(North Macedonia) Risto Mitrevski	(Serbia) Donji Srem	

== Kit ==
Supplier	Sponsors	
(Bosnia and Herzegovina) Haad	Visit Malaysia (Turkey) Turkish Airlines	Front
(Bosnia and Herzegovina) Haad	(Bosnia and Herzegovina) VAKUFSKA BANKA	Back
(Bosnia and Herzegovina) Haad	(Bosnia and Herzegovina) BH Telecom	Sleeves

== Pre-season and friendlies ==
Win Draw Loss Fixtures

22 June 2014 Friendly	Sarajevo (Bosnia and Herzegovina)	8–0	(Bosnia and Herzegovina) Natron Maglaj	Sarajevo
18:00	Stojčev 34'; Todorović; Bilbija; Duljević 63', 76', 85'; Okić 79'; Handžić 88'	Report		Stadium: Asim Ferhatović Hase Stadium

26 June 2014 Friendly	Sarajevo (Bosnia and Herzegovina)	8–0	(Bosnia and Herzegovina) Prokosovići	Vogošća
18:00	Radovac 19'; Dupovac 28'; Velkoski 37'; Okić 45'; Gavrić 62'; Gabeljić 83'; Stojčev 90'; Bilbija	Report		Stadium: Stadion Hakija Mršo; Attendance: 100

28 June 2014 Friendly	Guber (Bosnia and Herzegovina)	2–4	(Bosnia and Herzegovina) Sarajevo	Srebrenica
17:30		Report	Radovac 31', 33', 46'; Okić 56'	Attendance: 300

2 July 2014 Friendly	Sarajevo (Bosnia and Herzegovina)	3–1	(Ukraine) Zorya Luhansk	Rogatec, Slovenia
17:00	Tatomirović 17'; Stojčev 55'; Radovac 88'	Report

4 July 2014 Friendly	Sarajevo (Bosnia and Herzegovina)	0–2	(North Macedonia) Vardar	Šentjur, Slovenia
17:00		Report

7 July 2014 Friendly	Krško (Slovenia)	1–3	(Bosnia and Herzegovina) Sarajevo	Krško, Slovenia
18:00		Report	Stojčev 61', 74'; Okić 80'	Stadium: Matija Gubec Stadium

9 July 2014 Friendly	Sarajevo (Bosnia and Herzegovina)	4–0	(Ukraine) Metalurh Zaporizhya	Lesce, Slovenia
18:30	Puzigaća 30'; Okić 37'; Stojčev 56'; Velkoski 79'	Report		Stadium: Stadion Lesce

12 July 2014 Friendly	Sarajevo (Bosnia and Herzegovina)	4–1	(Wales) Cardiff City U21	Sarajevo
21:05	Puzigaća 32', 47'; Radovac 60'; Bilbija 67'	Report		Stadium: Asim Ferhatović Hase Stadium; Attendance: 3,000; Referee: Irfan Peljto (Sarajevo)

20 July 2014 Friendly	Sarajevo (Bosnia and Herzegovina)	2–0	(Bosnia and Herzegovina) Radnički Lukavac	Vogošća
	Kostić; Anđušić			Stadium: Stadion Hakija Mršo

9 September 2014 Friendly	Brotnjo (Bosnia and Herzegovina)	0–4	(Bosnia and Herzegovina) Sarajevo	Čitluk
			Todorović 55'; Bilbija; Purić 67'; Puzigaća 87'	Stadium: Gradski stadion Bare

12 November 2014 Friendly	Bratstvo Gračanica (Bosnia and Herzegovina)	1–0	(Bosnia and Herzegovina) Sarajevo	Gračanica
14:00		Report		Stadium: Gradski stadion Luke; Attendance: 1,000; Referee: Elvis Mujić (Banovići)

31 January 2015 Friendly	Bosna Visoko (Bosnia and Herzegovina)	2–1	(Bosnia and Herzegovina) Sarajevo	Visoko
14:00		Report	Puzigaća (pen.)	Stadium: Gradski stadion Luke (Visoko); Attendance: 650; Referee: Avdo Seferović (Visoko)

4 February 2015 Friendly	Sarajevo (Bosnia and Herzegovina)	1–0	(Ukraine) Metalist Kharkiv	Antalya, Turkey
14:00	Stojčev 10'; Benko (yellow card)	Report

7 February 2015 Friendly	Partizan (Serbia)	0–1	(Bosnia and Herzegovina) Sarajevo	Antalya, Turkey
16:30		Report	Bilbija (yellow card) 49'; Benko 88'; Okić (yellow card) 89'	Stadium: Miracle resorts Attendance: 50; Referee: Georgij Vodočkorija (Georgia)

11 February 2015 Friendly	Sarajevo (Bosnia and Herzegovina)	1–0	(Romania) Poli Timișoara	Antalya, Turkey
16:30	Rustemović (yellow card) 25'; Berberović (red card) 43'; Benko 48'; Stojčev (yellow card) 54'; Bilbija (yellow card) 80'; Purić (yellow card) 83'	Report

14 February 2015 Friendly	Sarajevo (Bosnia and Herzegovina)	2–1	(Armenia) Shirak	Antalya, Turkey
16:30	Bilbija 4'; Stojčev 80'	Report

20 February 2015 Friendly	Sarajevo (Bosnia and Herzegovina)	1–0	(Bosnia and Herzegovina) Leotar	Čitluk
13:30	Tatomirović 22'	Report		Stadium: Gradski stadion Bare; Attendance: 30

20 February 2015 Friendly	Sarajevo (Bosnia and Herzegovina)	2–1	(Bosnia and Herzegovina) Sloboda Tuzla	Čitluk
15:00	Kovačević 48'; Velkoski 80'	Report		Stadium: Gradski stadion Bare

28 March 2015 Friendly	Sarajevo (Bosnia and Herzegovina)	7–0	(Bosnia and Herzegovina) UNIS Vogošća	Sarajevo
	Benko; Duljević; Bilbija; Puzigaća; Rustemović	Report		Stadium: Asim Ferhatović Hase Stadium

== Competitions ==
=== Overview ===
Competition	First match	Last match	Starting round	Final position	Record							
Competition	First match	Last match	Starting round	Final position	Pld	W	D	L	GF	GA	GD	Win %
Premier League	3 August 2014	30 May 2015	Matchday 1	Winners	30	19	9	2	55	17	+38	63.33
Cup of BiH	17 September 2014	18 March 2015	First round	Quarter-finals	5	4	0	1	12	4	+8	80.00
Europa League	17 July 2014	28 August 2014	Second qualifying round	Play-off round	6	2	0	4	9	15	−6	33.33
Total					41	25	9	7	76	36	+40	60.98

Source: Competitions

=== Premier League ===
==== League table ====
Pos	Team	Pld	W	D	L	GF	GA	GD	Pts	Qualification or relegation
1	Sarajevo (C)	30	19	9	2	55	17	+38	66	Qualification to Champions League second qualifying round
2	Željezničar	30	18	9	3	52	22	+30	63	Qualification to Europa League first qualifying round
3	Zrinjski	30	16	11	3	41	13	+28	59	Qualification to Europa League first qualifying round
4	Široki Brijeg	30	15	11	4	46	23	+23	56	
5	Borac Banja Luka	30	14	7	9	26	26	0	49	

Source: uefa.com
Rules for classification: 1) points; 2) goal difference; 3) number of goals scored
(C) Champions

==== Results summary ====
Overall								Home						Away					
Pld	W	D	L	GF	GA	GD	Pts	W	D	L	GF	GA	GD	W	D	L	GF	GA	GD
30	19	9	2	55	17	+38	66	10	5	0	31	7	+24	9	4	2	24	10	+14

Source: Sportsport.ba

==== Results by round ====
Round	1	2	3	4	5	6	7	8	9	10	11	12	13	14	15	16	17	18	19	20	21	22	23	24	25	26	27	28	29	30
Ground	H	A	H	A	H	H	A	H	A	H	A	H	A	H	A	A	H	A	H	A	A	H	A	H	A	H	A	H	A	H
Result	W	W	D	D	W	D	D	W	L	W	D	W	W	W	W	W	D	L	W	D	W	D	W	W	W	W	W	D	W	W
Position	1	1	1	3	3	4	5	3	5	5	5	5	4	3	2	2	2	3	2	2	2	4	3	1	1	1	1	1	1	1

Source: Competitions
A = Away; H = Home; W = Win; D = Draw; L = Loss

==== Matches ====
3 August 2014 1	Sarajevo	3–0 (awd.)	Zvijezda	Sarajevo
19:00		Report		Stadium: Asim Ferhatović Hase Stadium; Attendance: 1,500; Referee: Tomislav Čuić (Tomislavgrad)

10 August 2014 2	Borac	1–3	Sarajevo	Banja Luka
19:00		Report	Miloš Stojčev (yellow card) 35'; Amer Dupovac (yellow card) 67'; Haris Duljević 68'; Nemanja Bilbija 74'; Ognjen Todorović 78'	Stadium: Banja Luka City Stadium; Attendance: 3,000; Referee: Edin Jakupović (Bihać)

16 August 2014 3	Sarajevo	1–1	Velež	Sarajevo
20:15	Amer Dupovac 64'	Report		Stadium: Asim Ferhatović Hase Stadium; Attendance: 3,500; Referee: Ognjen Valjić (Banja Luka)

24 August 2014 4	Mladost Velika Obarska	1–1	Sarajevo	Bijeljina
17:00		Report	Mario Barić (yellow card) 22'; Miloš Stojčev 24'; Nemanja Bilbija (penalty missed) 90'+	Stadium: Gradski stadion (Bijeljina); Attendance: 1,200; Referee: Dragan Skakić (B. Gradiška)

31 August 2014 6	Sarajevo	2–2	Travnik	Sarajevo
20:00	Bojan Puzigaća 23'; Nemanja Bilbija (yellow card) 23'; Krste Velkoski 35'	Report		Stadium: Asim Ferhatović Hase Stadium; Attendance: 3,000; Referee: Elvis Mujić (Banovići)

13 September 2014 7	Čelik	1–1	Sarajevo	Zenica
19:00		Report	Krste Velkoski 6'; Bojan Puzigaća (yellow card) 20'; Ognjen Todorović (yellow card) 55'; Amer Dupovac (yellow card) 60'; Džemal Berberović (yellow card) 62'; Nemanja Bilbija (yellow card) 76'	Stadium: Bilino Polje Stadium; Attendance: 4,000; Referee: Danijel Pajić (Bijeljina)

20 September 2014 8	Sarajevo	4–2	Olimpic	Sarajevo
17:00	Bojan Puzigaća 9'; Gojko Cimirot (yellow card) 14'; Haris Duljević 16'; Bojan Puzigaća 34'; Samir Radovac 90' (yellow card)	Report		Stadium: Asim Ferhatović Hase Stadium; Attendance: 600; Referee: Dragan Skakić (Gradiška)

24 September 2014 5	Sarajevo	2–0	Drina	Sarajevo
16:00	Miloš Stojčev (yellow card) 18'; Amer Dupovac (yellow card) 30'; Krste Velkoski 32'; Bojan Puzigaća 37'; Samir Radovac (yellow card) 67'	Report		Stadium: Asim Ferhatović Hase Stadium; Attendance: 1,500; Referee: Muamer Bureković (Zenica)

28 September 2014 9	Široki Brijeg	1–0	Sarajevo	Široki Brijeg
18:30		Report	Dejan Bandović (yellow card) 35'; Bojan Puzigaća (yellow card) 64'; Ognjen Todorović (yellow card) 83'; Džemal Berberović (yellow card) 35' (yellow-red card) 87'	Stadium: Stadion Pecara; Attendance: 3,500; Referee: Predrag Stankić (Bijeljina)

5 October 2014 10	Sarajevo	3–0	Slavija	Sarajevo
15:00	Ševko Okić 40'; Amer Dupovac 45'; Bojan Puzigaća 50'; Džemal Berberović (yellow card) 73'	Report		Stadium: Asim Ferhatović Hase Stadium; Attendance: 6,500; Referee: Tomislav Čuić (Tomislavgrad)

18 October 2014 11	Zrinjski	1–1	Sarajevo	Mostar
16:00		Report	Mario Barić (yellow card) 31'; Ševko Okić 55'; Ivan Tatomirović (yellow card) 89'	Stadium: Stadion pod Bijelim Brijegom; Attendance: 4,500; Referee: Edin Jakupović (Bihać)

25 October 2014 12	Sarajevo	5–0	Radnik	Sarajevo
14:30	Ševko Okić 14'; Krste Velkoski 21' 24'; Nemanja Bilbija 31'; Ševko Okić 48'; Gojko Cimirot (yellow card) 59'	Report		Stadium: Asim Ferhatović Hase Stadium; Attendance: 1,500; Referee: Emir Spahalić (Mostar)

2 November 2014 13	Željezničar	1–2	Sarajevo	Sarajevo
13:30		Report	Krste Velkoski 13'; Džemal Berberović (yellow card) 45'; Ivan Tatomirović (yellow card) 55'; Haris Duljević 69' (yellow card) 90'	Stadium: Stadion Grbavica; Attendance: 11,000; Referee: Muamer Bureković (Zenica)

8 November 2014 14	Sarajevo	1–0	Vitez	Sarajevo
13:30	Bojan Puzigaća (penalty scored) 45'; Adnan Kovačević (yellow card) 86'	Report		Stadium: Asim Ferhatović Hase Stadium; Attendance: 1,500; Referee: Zoran Grbić (Prijedor)

23 November 2014 15	Sloboda	0–2	Sarajevo	Tuzla
13:00		Report	Ševko Okić (yellow card) 29'; Bojan Puzigaća (penalty scored) 77'; Miloš Stojčev (yellow card) 89'; Ševko Okić 90'	Stadium: Tušanj City Stadium; Attendance: 4,000; Referee: Ognjen Valjić (Banja Luka)

28 February 2015 16	Zvijezda	0–3	Sarajevo	Gradačac
14:45		Report	Amer Bekić 17'; Leon Benko 20'; Džemal Berberović (yellow card) 43'; Edin Rustemović (yellow card) 67'; Leon Benko 76' (yellow card)	Stadium: Stadion Banja Ilidža (Gradačac); Attendance: 3,500; Referee: Edin Jakupović (Bihać)

14 March 2015 17	Sarajevo	0–0	Borac	Sarajevo
17:00	Marko Mihojević (yellow card) 49'; Bojan Puzigaća (red card) 84'	Report		Stadium: Asim Ferhatović Hase Stadium; Attendance: 6,000; Referee: Husein Terzić (Travnik)

21 March 2015 18	Velež	2–0	Sarajevo	Mostar
15:30		Report	Ahmad Kallasi (yellow card) 85'	Stadium: Vrapčići Stadium; Attendance: 2,500; Referee: Vladimir Bjelica (I. Sarajevo)

4 April 2015 19	Sarajevo	4–0	Mladost Velika Obarska	Sarajevo
16:30	Mario Barić (yellow card) 19'; Ivan Tatomirović (yellow card) 24'; Nemanja Bilbija 33'; Leon Benko 55'; Samir Radovac 60'; Miloš Stojčev 88'	Report		Stadium: Asim Ferhatović Hase Stadium; Attendance: 2,500; Referee: Edin Jakupović (Bihać)

8 April 2015 20	Drina	0–0	Sarajevo	Zvornik
16:30		Report	Amer Bekić (yellow card) 79'	Stadium: Gradski stadion (Zvornik); Attendance: 1,000; Referee: Muamer Bureković (Zenica)

13 April 2015 21	Travnik	0–2	Sarajevo	Travnik
16:30		Report	Ivan Tatomirović (yellow card) 24'; Dario Purić (yellow card) 45'; Bojan Puzigaća 45+3'; Leon Benko 48'	Stadium: Stadion Pirota; Attendance: 2,500; Referee: Dragan Skakić (Gradiška)

17 April 2015 22	Sarajevo	1–1	Čelik	Sarajevo
18:00	Džemal Berberović (yellow card) 17'; Leon Benko 19'	Report		Stadium: Asim Ferhatović Hase Stadium; Attendance: 3,500; Referee: Zoran Grbić (Prijedor)

22 April 2015 23	Olimpic	0–1	Sarajevo	Sarajevo
16:30		Report	Leon Benko 5' (yellow card) 90'; Mehmed Alispahić (yellow card) 90'	Stadium: Stadion Otoka; Attendance: 2,500; Referee: Muamer Bureković (Zenica)

26 April 2015 24	Sarajevo	1–0	Široki Brijeg	Sarajevo
16:00	Krste Velkoski 11'; Mehmed Alispahić (yellow card) 79'; Gojko Cimirot (yellow card) 86'; Džemal Berberović (yellow card) 90'	Report		Stadium: Asim Ferhatović Hase Stadium; Attendance: 8,500; Referee: Dragan Skakić (Gradiška)

3 May 2015 25	Slavija	2–3	Sarajevo	Istočno Sarajevo
16:00		Report	Leon Benko 4'; Ahmad Kallasi (yellow card) 42'; Krste Velkoski 61'; Ivan Tatomirović (yellow card) 86'; Miloš Stojčev 90+3' (yellow card)	Stadium: Gradski SRC Slavija; Attendance: 500; Referee: Ognjen Valjić (Banja Luka)

9 May 2015 26	Sarajevo	1–0	Zrinjski	Sarajevo
17:00	Leon Benko 80' (yellow card)	Report		Stadium: Asim Ferhatović Hase Stadium; Attendance: 12,000; Referee: Edin Jakupović (Bihać)

13 May 2015 27	Radnik	0–2	Sarajevo	Ugljevik
17:00		Report	Ahmad Kallasi 16'; Radoš Protić (yellow card) 29'; Ahmad Kallasi (yellow card) 36'; Matej Delač (yellow card) 65'; Krste Velkoski 71'; Miloš Stojčev (yellow card) 80'	Stadium: Ugljevik City Stadium; Attendance: 1,700; Referee: Dragan Petrović (Banja Luka)

16 May 2015 28	Sarajevo	0–0	Željezničar	Sarajevo
17:00	Nemanja Bilbija (yellow card) 18'; Amer Bekić (yellow card) 55'	Report		Stadium: Asim Ferhatović Hase Stadium; Attendance: 26,000; Referee: Ognjen Valjić (Banja Luka)

23 May 2015 29	Vitez	0–3	Sarajevo	Vitez
17:00		Report	Krste Velkoski 26'; Gojko Cimirot (yellow card) 63'; Bojan Puzigaća (penalty scored) 86'; Leon Benko (yellow card) 86'; Amer Bekić 90'	Stadium: Gradski stadion (Vitez); Attendance: 2,500; Referee: Dragan Skakić (Gradiška)

30 May 2015 30	Sarajevo	3–1	Sloboda	Sarajevo
17:00	Leon Benko 12'; Krste Velkoski 18'; Nemanja Bilbija (yellow card) 37'; Miloš Stojčev (yellow card) 68'; Nemanja Bilbija 78'; Matej Delač (yellow card) 85'	Report	Zajko Zeba 30'	Stadium: Asim Ferhatović Hase Stadium; Attendance: 22,500; Referee: Dragan Petrović (Banja Luka)

=== Cup of Bosnia and Herzegovina ===
==== Round of 32 ====
17 September 2014	Igman	0–3	Sarajevo	Konjic
16:00		Report	Duljević 31'; Protić (yellow card) 45+3'; Tatomirović 90+10'; Velkoski 90+22'	Stadium: Konjic City Stadium; Attendance: 2,500; Referee: Goran Paradžik (Ljubuški)

==== Round of 16 ====
1 October 2014 First leg	Sarajevo	4–0	Travnik	Sarajevo
17:00	Barić 6' (yellow card) 69'; Stojčev (yellow card) 21'; Okić 30', 67', 90'	Report		Stadium: Asim Ferhatović Hase Stadium; Attendance: 1,600; Referee: Goran Paradžik (Ljubuški)

21 October 2014 Second leg	Travnik	2–3 (2–7 agg.)	Sarajevo	Travnik
15:00		Report	Plakalo (yellow card) 9'; Stojčev 31'; Radovac 44'; Berberović (yellow card) 79'; Velkoski 81' (yellow card) 86'	Stadium: Stadion Pirota; Attendance: 800; Referee: Darko Obradović (Stolac)

==== Quarter-finals ====
11 March 2015 First leg	Sarajevo	1–2	Borac	Sarajevo
18:00	Okić 54'; Duljević (yellow card) 61'; Kovačević (yellow card) 75'	Report		Stadium: Asim Ferhatović Hase Stadium; Attendance: 7,500; Referee: Tomislav Čuić (Tomislavgrad)

18 March 2015 Second leg	Borac	0–1 (2 (a)–2 agg.)	Sarajevo	Banja Luka
18:30		Report	Rustemović (yellow card) 49'; Benko (yellow card) 56'; Mihojević (yellow card) 61'; Velkoski 62'	Stadium: Banja Luka City Stadium; Attendance: 4,000; Referee: Edin Jakupović (Bihać)

=== UEFA Europa League ===
==== Second qualifying round ====
17 July 2014 First leg	Sarajevo (Bosnia and Herzegovina)	0–1	(Norway) Haugesund	Sarajevo, Bosnia and Herzegovina
21:00 CEST (UTC+2)		Report	Haraldseid (yellow card) 73'; Bamberg 85'	Stadium: Asim Ferhatović Hase Stadium; Attendance: 13,000; Referee: Anatoliy Zhabchenko (Ukraine)

24 July 2014 Second leg	Haugesund (Norway)	1–3 (2–3 agg.)	(Bosnia and Herzegovina) Sarajevo	Haugesund, Norway
18:00 CEST (UTC+2)	Sema 47' (pen.); Anyora (yellow card) 69'; Gytkjær (yellow card) 84'; Andreassen (yellow card) 88'	Report	Stojčev 21'; Okić 36', 82'; Berberović (yellow card) 47' (yellow-red card) 79'; Bandović (yellow card) 86'	Stadium: Haugesund Stadion; Attendance: 3,879; Referee: Mihály Fábián (Hungary)

==== Third qualifying round ====
31 July 2014 First leg	Sarajevo (Bosnia and Herzegovina)	1–2	(Greece) Atromitos	Sarajevo, Bosnia and Herzegovina
20:30 CEST (UTC+2)	Puzigaća 26', (yellow card) 86'; Stojčev (yellow card) 66'; Velkoski (yellow card) 72'; Purić (yellow card) 85'	Report	Fytanidis 11'; Tavlaridis (yellow card) 31'; Brito (yellow card) 38'; Nastos 75'; Tatos (yellow card) 81'	Stadium: Asim Ferhatović Hase Stadium; Attendance: 15,000; Referee: Ivaylo Stoyanov (Bulgaria)

7 August 2014 Second leg	Atromitos (Greece)	1–3 (a.e.t.) (3–4 agg.)	(Bosnia and Herzegovina) Sarajevo	Athens, Greece
21:00 EEST (UTC+3)	Brito (yellow card) 9'; Karamanos (yellow card) 74'; Tavlaridis 86'; Tatos (yellow card) 110'	Report	Duljević 24'; Tatomirović (yellow card) 56'; Bilbija 80', 105'; Dupovac (yellow card) 82'	Stadium: Peristeri Stadium; Attendance: 2,300; Referee: Arnold Hunter (Northern Ireland)

==== Play-off round ====
21 August 2014 First leg	Sarajevo (Bosnia and Herzegovina)	2–3	(Germany) Borussia Mönchengladbach	Sarajevo, Bosnia and Herzegovina
20:45 CEST (UTC+2)	Puzigaća 26'; Tatomirović (yellow card) 31'; Duljević 59'	Report	Hahn 11'; Hrgota 41', 73'	Stadium: Asim Ferhatović Hase Stadium; Attendance: 29,000; Referee: Antonio Mateu Lahoz (Spain)

28 August 2014 Second leg	Borussia Mönchengladbach (Germany)	7–0 (10–2 agg.)	(Bosnia and Herzegovina) Sarajevo	Mönchengladbach, Germany
20:45 CEST (UTC+2)	Hahn 20'; Xhaka 24'; Jantschke (yellow card) 31'; Hrgota 34', 67', 82'; Hazard 74' (pen.), 90+2'	Report	Dupovac (yellow card) 73'; Berberović (yellow card) 74'; Tatomirović (yellow card) 89' (yellow-red card) 90'	Stadium: Borussia-Park; Attendance: 44,152; Referee: Vladislav Bezborodov (Russia)

== Statistics ==
=== Appearances and goals ===
No.	Pos	Nat	Player	Total		Premier League		Cup of BiH		Europa League	
No.	Pos	Nat	Player	Apps	Goals	Apps	Goals	Apps	Goals	Apps	Goals
Goalkeepers
1	GK	(Bosnia and Herzegovina) BIH	Emir Plakalo	2	0	0	0	2	0	0	0
2	GK	(Croatia) CRO	Matej Delač	15	0	14	0	1	0	0	0
19	GK	(Bosnia and Herzegovina) BIH	Dejan Bandović	23	0	15	0	2	0	6	0
30/32	GK	(Bosnia and Herzegovina) BIH	Senedin Oštraković	0	0	0	0	0	0	0	0
Defenders
3	DF	(Serbia) SRB	Radoš Protić	17	0	4+4	0	5	0	0+4	0
5	DF	(Croatia) CRO	Mario Barić	17	1	13	0	2	1	2	0
6	DF	(Bosnia and Herzegovina) BIH	Adnan Kovačević	20	0	4+8	0	3	0	0+5	0
14	DF	(Serbia) SRB	Ivan Tatomirović	37	1	27	0	4	1	6	0
15	DF	(Bosnia and Herzegovina) BIH	Advan Kadušić	0	0	0	0	0	0	0	0
16	DF	(Bosnia and Herzegovina) BIH	Marko Mihojević	6	0	4+1	0	1	0	0	0
23	DF	(Bosnia and Herzegovina) BIH	Džemal Berberović	28	0	20+2	0	1+1	0	4	0
55	DF	(Syria) SYR	Ahmad Kalasi	13	1	10	1	3	0	0	0
77	DF	(Bosnia and Herzegovina) BIH	Bojan Puzigaća	33	11	25+1	9	0+1	0	6	2
Midfielders
4	MF	(Bosnia and Herzegovina) BIH	Edin Rustemović	15	0	8+6	0	1	0	0	0
7	MF	(Serbia) SRB	Miloš Stojčev	38	5	23+5	3	3+1	1	6	1
10	MF	(Bosnia and Herzegovina) BIH	Mehmed Alispahić	10	0	1+7	0	1+1	0	0	0
17	MF	(Bosnia and Herzegovina) BIH	Haris Duljević	34	6	15+9	3	4	1	3+3	2
18	MF	(Bosnia and Herzegovina) BIH	Dario Purić	8	0	2+3	0	1+1	0	0+1	0
20	MF	(Bosnia and Herzegovina) BIH	Nemanja Anđušić	0	0	0	0	0	0	0	0
59	MF	(Bosnia and Herzegovina) BIH	Gojko Cimirot	36	0	24+2	0	4	0	6	0
70	MF	(Ivory Coast) CIV	Germain Kouadio	0	0	0	0	0	0	0	0
88	MF	(Bosnia and Herzegovina) BIH	Samir Radovac	33	3	19+4	2	3+1	1	5+1	0
97	MF	(Bosnia and Herzegovina) BIH	Elvedin Herić	0	0	0	0	0	0	0	0
Forwards
8	FW	(Bosnia and Herzegovina) BIH	Amer Bekić	18	2	8+9	2	0+1	0	0	0
9	FW	(Bosnia and Herzegovina) BIH	Ševko Okić	30	11	13+7	5	3+1	4	6	2
11	FW	(North Macedonia) MKD	Krste Velkoski	36	14	21+4	11	3+2	3	6	0
21	FW	(Croatia) CRO	Leon Benko	16	9	14	9	1+1	0	0	0
99	FW	(Bosnia and Herzegovina) BIH	Nemanja Bilbija	27	6	16+4	4	1	0	4+2	2
Players transferred out during the season
2	MF	(Serbia) SRB	Miroljub Kostić	6	0	3+1	0	0+2	0	0	0
13	MF	(Bosnia and Herzegovina) BIH	Ognjen Todorović	11	1	3+6	1	1+1	0	0	0
15	DF	(North Macedonia) MKD	Risto Mitrevski	1	0	0	0	1	0	0	0
29	DF	(Bosnia and Herzegovina) BIH	Amer Dupovac	21	2	13	2	2	0	6	0
30	GK	(Serbia) SRB	Marko Ivkić	0	0	0	0	0	0	0	0
50	MF	(Bosnia and Herzegovina) BIH	Faris Handžić	6	0	0+2	0	2+1	0	0+1	0

Number after the "+" sign represents the number of games player started the game on the bench and was substituted on.

=== Goalscorers ===
Rank	No.	Pos.	Nat.	Player	Premier League	Cup of BiH	Europa League	Total
1	11	FW	(North Macedonia)	Krste Velkoski	11	3	0	14
2	9	FW	(Bosnia and Herzegovina)	Ševko Okić	5	4	2	11
2	77	DF	(Bosnia and Herzegovina)	Bojan Puzigaća	9	0	2	11
4	21	FW	(Croatia)	Leon Benko	9	0	0	9
5	17	MF	(Bosnia and Herzegovina)	Haris Duljević	3	1	2	6
5	99	FW	(Bosnia and Herzegovina)	Nemanja Bilbija	4	0	2	6
7	7	MF	(Serbia)	Miloš Stojčev	3	1	1	5
8	88	MF	(Bosnia and Herzegovina)	Samir Radovac	2	1	0	3
9	8	FW	(Bosnia and Herzegovina)	Amer Bekić	2	0	0	2
9	29	DF	(Bosnia and Herzegovina)	Amer Dupovac	2	0	0	2
11	5	DF	(Croatia)	Mario Barić	0	1	0	1
11	13	MF	(Bosnia and Herzegovina)	Ognjen Todorović	1	0	0	1
11	14	DF	(Serbia)	Ivan Tatomirović	0	1	0	1
11	55	DF	(Syria)	Ahmad Kalasi	1	0	0	1
Total					52	12	9	73
