= Mario Barić =

Bosnian Croat footballer

Personal information
- Full name: Mario Barić
- Date of birth: 15 April 1985 (age 41)
- Place of birth: Travnik, SFR Yugoslavia
- Height: 1.84 m (6 ft 0 in)
- Position: Right back

Team information
- Current team: Sesvetski Kraljevec

Youth career
- 1995–1997: Maksimir
- 1997–2000: Dinamo Zagreb
- 2000–2003: Croatia Sesvete

Senior career*
Years	Team	Apps	(Gls)
2003–2007	Žminj		
2007–2010	Karlovac	87	(1)
2010–2012	Gent	68	(0)
2012–2013	Slaven Belupo	15	(1)
2013	Vojvodina	4	(0)
2014–2016	FK Sarajevo	33	(1)
2016	Vitez	11	(0)
2016–2017	Zrinjski Mostar	23	(0)
2018–2019	Dubrava		
2019	Zelina		
2019-2020	SV Wolfau	20	(2)
2021–	Sesvetski Kraljevec		
- * Club domestic league appearances and goals as of 3 June 2022

Mario Barić (born 15 April 1985) is a Bosnian Croat retired footballer.

== Club career ==
Born in Travnik, SR Bosnia and Herzegovina, back then part of Yugoslavia, Barić initially played with Croatia Sesvete and NK Žminj from where he moved to NK Karlovac in 2007, who at the time were playing in the Croatian Second League. He managed promotion with Karlovac to the Croatian First League in 2008 and played two more seasons with them in Croatian top level.

During the winter-break of the 2010–11 season, he moved to Belgium where he joined K.A.A. Gent and played two years with them in Belgian First Division A. At the winter-break of the 2012–13 season, he left Gent and returned to Croatia where he played the second half of the season with Slaven Belupo in the Croatian First League. The following summer, he, along with his compatriot Matej Delač, joined Serbian SuperLiga side FK Vojvodina. However, while Delač became the main goalkeeper, Barić played few games, none of which were in the league. He was released by Vojvodina during the following winter-break despite having initially signed a two-year contract.

During the winter-break of 2013–14 season, both Barić and Delač left Vojvodina and joined FK Sarajevo, Barić's first club in the Premier League of Bosnia and Herzegovina. He stayed with Sarajevo two years, where he made a total of 35 appearances in official games and scored one goal. In the winter-break of the 2015–16 season, Barić moved to another Bosnian Premier League club, NK Vitez, where he played until the end of the season.

In summer 2016 he signed with HŠK Zrinjski Mostar. He was released by Zrinjski in October 2017.

In 2018, Baric joined NK Dubrava where he played until February 2019, when he then joined NK Zelina.

He finished his career at Austrian lower league side SV Wolfau.

== Career statistics ==
As of 1 November 2015

Club performance			League		Cup		Continental		Total	
Season	Club	League	Apps	Goals	Apps	Goals	Apps	Goals	Apps	Goals
Bosnia and Herzegovina			League		Cup		Europe		Total	
2013–14	FK Sarajevo	Premijer liga BiH	8	0	5	0	–		13	0
2014–15	FK Sarajevo	Premijer liga BiH	13	0	2	1	2	0	17	1
2015–16	FK Sarajevo	Premijer liga BiH	7	0	1	0	0	0	8	0
2014–15	FK Sarajevo Total		28	0	8	1	2	0	38	1

== Honours ==
FK Sarajevo

- Bosnia and Herzegovina Football Cup: 2013–14
- Premier League of Bosnia and Herzegovina: 2014–15

Zrinjski

- Premier League of Bosnia and Herzegovina: 2016–17, 2017–18
