= Samir Radovac =

Bosnian footballer (born 1996)

Personal information
- Date of birth: 25 January 1996 (age 30)
- Place of birth: Sarajevo, Bosnia and Herzegovina
- Height: 1.78 m (5 ft 10 in)
- Position: Central midfielder

Team information
- Current team: Željezničar
- Number: 88

Youth career
- –2013: Sarajevo

Senior career*
Years	Team	Apps	(Gls)
2013–2019	Sarajevo	97	(3)
2019	Olimpik	13	(1)
2019–2020	PAS Giannina	2	(0)
2020–2023	Velež Mostar	60	(8)
2023	Novi Pazar	15	(0)
2023–2024	Ilioupoli	8	(0)
2024–	Željezničar	60	(1)

International career
2012	Bosnia and Herzegovina U17	4	(1)
2014	Bosnia and Herzegovina U18	1	(0)
2013–2015	Bosnia and Herzegovina U19	12	(2)
2014–2015	Bosnia and Herzegovina U21	3	(0)
- * Club domestic league appearances and goals as of 7 November 2026

Samir Radovac (born 25 January 1996) is a Bosnian professional footballer who plays as a central midfielder for Bosnian Premier League club Željezničar. He has also represented Bosnia and Herzegovina at youth international level.

== Club career ==
=== Sarajevo ===
Born in Sarajevo, Radovac began playing football at the age of six and joined the youth system of FK Sarajevo. He spent his entire youth career with the club and won national championships at youth level.

Radovac made his first-team debut at the age of 17 on 9 March 2013, coming on in a 3–0 league victory against Rudar Prijedor. He made eight first-team appearances by the end of the 2012–13 season.

During the following campaign, Radovac was temporarily returned to Sarajevo's junior team under manager Robert Jarni, before being recalled to the first team after Dženan Uščuplić became manager. He was part of the Sarajevo side that won the 2013–14 Bosnia and Herzegovina Football Cup, his first senior trophy.

Radovac established himself as a regular during the 2014–15 season, forming a midfield partnership with Gojko Cimirot. He made 33 appearances in all competitions and scored three goals as Sarajevo won the Bosnian Premier League, their first league championship in eight years.

In October 2016, Radovac made his 100th competitive appearance for Sarajevo, becoming, at the time, the youngest player in the club's history to reach that milestone. He was also named captain during his spell with the club.

Radovac's playing time subsequently decreased. He later stated that disagreements concerning his contract and role in the first team contributed to his decline in prominence at the club. He left Sarajevo in early 2019 after more than 120 competitive appearances for the club.

=== Olimpik and PAS Giannina ===
On 6 February 2019, Radovac joined Olimpik on a contract until the end of the season. He made 13 league appearances and scored once as Olimpik competed for promotion from the First League of the Federation of Bosnia and Herzegovina.

Later that year, Radovac moved abroad for the first time, joining Greek club PAS Giannina. He struggled for regular playing time during his six months in Greece, with injuries also affecting his spell at the club. He left PAS Giannina during the January 2020 transfer window.

=== Velež Mostar ===
Radovac returned to Bosnia and Herzegovina in January 2020, signing a two-and-a-half-year contract with Velež Mostar.

He became an important member of the Velež midfield during the 2020–21 season, making 30 league appearances and scoring six goals. In November 2020, Velež manager Feđa Dudić described Radovac as one of the best midfielders in the league, while Radovac called his move to Velež the best decision of his career to that point.

Radovac helped Velež qualify for European competition and subsequently played in the UEFA Conference League. During the 2021–22 season, he also helped the club win the 2021–22 Bosnia and Herzegovina Football Cup. He started the final against his former club Sarajevo, which Velež won 4–3 on penalties following a goalless draw.

His final season at Velež was disrupted by injury. In November 2022, Radovac announced that he and the club had agreed to terminate his contract after Velež proposed a mutual separation. He left after 76 appearances and nine goals in all competitions.

=== Novi Pazar and Ilioupoli ===
On 15 January 2023, Radovac signed with Serbian club Novi Pazar on a contract running until the summer of 2024. He made 15 appearances in the Serbian SuperLiga during the second half of the 2022–23 season before leaving the club in the summer.

On 26 September 2023, Radovac returned to Greece and signed with Ilioupoli of Super League Greece 2, agreeing a contract until the summer of 2024. He made eight league appearances for the club.

=== Željezničar ===
On 17 January 2024, Radovac returned to Sarajevo to join Željezničar, the city rivals of his former club Sarajevo, signing a contract until the summer of 2025. Discussing the move, Radovac acknowledged his long association with Sarajevo but stated that he was joining Željezničar as a professional.

He made eight league appearances during the remainder of the 2023–24 season. Radovac became a more regular member of the team during the following campaign, making 27 league appearances and scoring once.

On 22 January 2025, Željezničar announced that Radovac had extended his contract until the summer of 2027.

== International career ==
Radovac represented Bosnia and Herzegovina at several youth levels, including the under-17, under-19 and under-21 teams. He scored goals for the country's youth national teams and was regarded as one of Bosnia and Herzegovina's prominent young players during his early years at Sarajevo.

== Career statistics ==
As of match played 7 November 2026

Appearances and goals by club, season and competition
Club	Season	League			National cup (Note: Includes Bosnian Cup, Greek Cup, Serbian Cup)		Continental		Total	
Club	Season	Division	Apps	Goals	Apps	Goals	Apps	Goals	Apps	Goals
Sarajevo	2012–13	Bosnian Premier League	8	0	—		—		8	0
Sarajevo	2013–14	Bosnian Premier League	19	0	4	1	1 (Note: Appearances in UEFA Europa League)	0	24	1
Sarajevo	2014–15	Bosnian Premier League	23	2	4	1	6	0	33	3
Sarajevo	2015–16	Bosnian Premier League	24	0	2	0	2 (Note: Appearances in UEFA Champions League)	0	28	0
Sarajevo	2016–17	Bosnian Premier League	14	1	4	0	—		18	1
Sarajevo	2017–18	Bosnian Premier League	9	0	—		2	0	11	0
Sarajevo	Total		97	3	14	2	11	0	122	5
Olimpik	2018–19	First League of FBiH	13	1	—		—		13	1
PAS Giannina	2019–20	Super League Greece 2	2	0	2	0	—		4	0
Velež Mostar	2019–20	Bosnian Premier League	2	0	—		—		2	0
Velež Mostar	2020–21	Bosnian Premier League	30	6	2	0	—		32	6
Velež Mostar	2021–22	Bosnian Premier League	27	2	6	1	5 (Note: Appearances in UEFA Conference League)	0	38	3
Velež Mostar	2022–23	Bosnian Premier League	1	0	1	0	2	0	4	0
Velež Mostar	Total		60	8	9	1	7	0	76	9
Novi Pazar	2022–23	Serbian SuperLiga	15	0	1	0	—		16	0
Ilioupoli	2023–24	Super League Greece 2	8	0	—		—		8	0
Željezničar	2023–24	Bosnian Premier League	8	0	—		—		8	0
Željezničar	2024–25	Bosnian Premier League	27	1	4	0	—		31	1
Željezničar	2025–26	Bosnian Premier League	13	0	3	0	—		16	0
Željezničar	2026–27	Bosnian Premier League	12	0	1	0	—		13	0
Željezničar	Total		60	1	8	0	—		68	1
Career total			255	13	34	3	18	0	307	16

== Honours ==
Sarajevo

- Bosnian Premier League: 2014–15
- Bosnian Cup: 2013–14

Velež Mostar

- Bosnian Cup: 2021–22
