= Adnan Kovačević =

Bosnian footballer (born 1993)

Personal information
- Date of birth: 9 September 1993 (age 33)
- Place of birth: Kotor Varoš, Bosnia and Herzegovina
- Height: 1.89 m (6 ft 2 in)
- Position: Centre-back

Team information
- Current team: Miedź Legnica
- Number: 5

Youth career
- NK Vlašić
- 2008–2011: Travnik

Senior career*
Years	Team	Apps	(Gls)
2011–2013	Travnik	47	(2)
2013–2017	Sarajevo	59	(3)
2017–2020	Korona Kielce	94	(7)
2020–2023	Ferencváros	46	(0)
2023–2024	Raków Częstochowa	15	(0)
2024–	Miedź Legnica	32	(5)

International career
2012–2013	Bosnia and Herzegovina U21	7	(0)
2019–2024	Bosnia and Herzegovina	13	(0)
- * Club domestic league appearances and goals as of 15:10, 29 May 2026 (UTC)

Adnan Kovačević (pronounced [ǎdnan koʋâːtʃeʋitɕ]; born 9 September 1993) is a Bosnian professional footballer who plays as a centre-back for I liga club Miedź Legnica.

Kovačević started his professional career at Travnik, before joining Sarajevo in 2013. Four years later, he moved to Korona Kielce. In 2020, he signed with Ferencváros. Three years later, he joined Raków. The following year, he switched to Miedź Legnica.

A former youth international for Bosnia and Herzegovina, Kovačević made his senior international debut in 2019, earning 13 caps until 2024.

== Club career ==
=== Early career ===
Kovačević started playing football at a local club before joining Travnik's youth setup in 2008. He made his professional debut against Borac Banja Luka on 19 May 2011 at the age of 17. On 28 May, he scored his first professional goal against Olimpic.

In July 2013, Kovačević switched to Sarajevo. In July 2016, he suffered a severe knee injury, which was diagnosed as an anterior cruciate ligament tear and was ruled out for at least six months.

In July 2017, he moved to Polish side Korona Kielce.

=== Ferencváros ===
In July 2020, Kovačević signed a three-year deal with Hungarian outfit Ferencváros. He made his official debut for the team in a UEFA Champions League qualifier against Djurgården on 19 August. Two weeks later, he made his league debut against Zalaegerszeg.

Kovačević debuted in the UEFA Champions League away at Barcelona on 20 October.

He won his first trophy with the club on 20 April 2021, when they were crowned league champions.

=== Raków Częstochowa ===
In June 2023, Kovačević joined Raków Częstochowa on a contract until June 2025. He made his competitive debut for the side on 11 August against Piast Gliwice.

=== Miedź Legnica ===
In September 2024, Kovačević joined Polish second tier club Miedź Legnica. In January 2025, after Nemanja Mijušković's departure, Kovačević was named Miedź's captain. In June 2025, he extended his deal with Miedź for another two years, with a one-year extension option.

== International career ==
Kovačević was a member of the Bosnia and Herzegovina under-21 team under coach Vlado Jagodić.

In August 2019, he received his first senior call up, for UEFA Euro 2020 qualifiers against Liechtenstein and Armenia, but had to wait until 12 October to make his debut against Finland.

== Personal life ==
Kovačević married his long-time girlfriend Edna in December 2020. Together they have a son named Dal.

== Career statistics ==
=== Club ===
As of match played 24 May 2026

Appearances and goals by club, season and competition
Club	Season	League			National cup (Note: Includes Bosnian Cup, Polish Cup, Magyar Kupa)		Continental		Other		Total	
Club	Season	Division	Apps	Goals	Apps	Goals	Apps	Goals	Apps	Goals	Apps	Goals
Travnik	2010–11	Bosnian Premier League	3	1	—		—		—		3	1
Travnik	2011–12	Bosnian Premier League	18	0	1	0	—		—		19	0
Travnik	2012–13	Bosnian Premier League	26	1	0	0	—		—		26	1
Travnik	Total		47	2	1	0	—		—		48	2
Sarajevo	2013–14	Bosnian Premier League	17	1	6	0	—		—		23	1
Sarajevo	2014–15	Bosnian Premier League	12	0	3	0	5 (Note: Appearances in UEFA Europa League)	0	—		20	0
Sarajevo	2015–16	Bosnian Premier League	21	2	4	0	0	0	—		25	2
Sarajevo	2016–17	Bosnian Premier League	9	0	4	1	—		—		13	1
Sarajevo	Total		59	3	17	1	5	0	—		81	4
Korona Kielce	2017–18	Ekstraklasa	29	0	6	0	—		—		35	0
Korona Kielce	2018–19	Ekstraklasa	31	2	0	0	—		—		31	2
Korona Kielce	2019–20	Ekstraklasa	34	5	0	0	—		—		34	5
Korona Kielce	Total		94	7	6	0	—		—		100	7
Ferencváros	2020–21	Nemzeti Bajnokság I	6	0	0	0	5 (Note: Appearances in UEFA Champions League)	0	—		11	0
Ferencváros	2021–22	Nemzeti Bajnokság I	20	0	3	0	6 (Note: Four appearances in UEFA Champions League, two appearances in UEFA Europa League)	0	—		29	0
Ferencváros	2022–23	Nemzeti Bajnokság I	20	0	0	0	8 (Note: Five appearances in UEFA Champions League, three appearances in UEFA Europa League)	0	—		28	0
Ferencváros	Total		46	0	3	0	19	0	—		68	0
Raków	2023–24	Ekstraklasa	15	0	0	0	7 (Note: Two appearances in UEFA Champions League, five appearances in UEFA Europa League)	0	—		22	0
Miedź Legnica	2024–25	I liga	24	5	2	0	—		1 (Note: Appearance in I liga promotion play-offs)	0	27	5
Miedź Legnica	2025–26	I liga	7	0	0	0	—		—		7	0
Miedź Legnica	Total		31	0	2	0	—		1	0	34	5
Career total			292	17	29	1	31	0	1	0	353	18

=== International ===
Appearances and goals by national team and year
National team	Year	Apps	Goals
Bosnia and Herzegovina
Bosnia and Herzegovina	2019	3	0
Bosnia and Herzegovina	2020	1	0
Bosnia and Herzegovina	2021	4	0
Bosnia and Herzegovina	2022	3	0
Bosnia and Herzegovina	2023	1	0
Bosnia and Herzegovina	2024	1	0
Total		13	0

== Honours ==
Sarajevo

- Bosnian Premier League: 2014–15
- Bosnian Cup: 2013–14

Ferencváros

- Nemzeti Bajnokság I: 2020–21, 2021–22, 2022–23
- Magyar Kupa: 2021–22
