= Dario Purić =

Bosnian footballer (born 1986)

Personal information
- Date of birth: 18 May 1986 (age 40)
- Place of birth: Slavonski Brod, SR Croatia, SFR Yugoslavia
- Height: 1.82 m (6 ft 0 in)
- Position: Midfielder

Youth career
- Modriča Maxima

Senior career*
Years	Team	Apps	(Gls)
2004–2007	Modriča Maxima	76	(6)
2007	OFK Belgrade	0	(0)
2008	Modriča Maxima	18	(3)
2008–2012	Čelik Zenica	86	(14)
2009	→ Slovan Liberec (loan)	1	(0)
2012–2013	Sloboda Užice	39	(3)
2014–2015	FK Sarajevo	17	(1)
2015–2016	Slavija Sarajevo	0	(0)
2016	Tekstilac Derventa	5	(0)
2017	Orašje	10	(0)
2017	Zvijezda	2	(0)
2018	Alfa Modriča	10	(0)
Total		264	(27)

International career
25.3.2004.	Bosnia U18	1	(0)
2004	Bosnia U19	2	(1)
2005–2008	Bosnia and Herzegovina U-21	8	(2)
2010	Bosnia and Herzegovina	1	(0)

Managerial career
- 19.1.2023-: NK Dinamo Donja Mahala
- * Club domestic league appearances and goals

Dario Purić (born 18 May 1986) is a Bosnian retired footballer who played as a midfielder.

== Club career ==
Born in Slavonski Brod, SR Croatia, Purić started his career in FK Modriča, one of the most prosperous clubs in Bosnia at time, where he stayed until 2008 when the club won the Bosnian championship. In the summer of 2007 his spell with FK Modriča was interrupted when he joined Serbian Superliga club OFK Belgrade, where he stayed for a half season without making any appearances.

In the summer of 2008 he moved to NK Čelik Zenica and, in summer 2009, he was loaned to the usual Czech Republic European club competitions representing the Gambrinus liga club FC Slovan Liberec. In January 2010 he returned to NK Čelik Zenica and has been playing with the club until summer 2012.

In the summer of 2012 Purić moved to Serbia again, joining top league side FK Sloboda Užice.

== International career ==
He has played regularly for the Bosnia and Herzegovina national under-21 football team, and is considered one of the most prospective Bosnian young footballers.

In December 2010, he made his debut and played his only game for the senior Bosnia national team, a friendly match against Poland.

== Career statistics ==
As of 6 December 2015

Club performance			League		Cup		Continental		Total	
Season	Club	League	Apps	Goals	Apps	Goals	Apps	Goals	Apps	Goals
Bosnia and Herzegovina			League		Cup		Europe		Total	
2013–14	FK Sarajevo	Premijer liga BiH	9	1	5	0	–		14	1
2014–15	FK Sarajevo	Premijer liga BiH	5	0	2	0	1	0	8	0
2015–16	FK Sarajevo	Premijer liga BiH	0	0	0	0	0	0	0	0
2014–15	FK Sarajevo Total		14	1	7	0	1	0	22	1

== Honours ==
Modriča

- Bosnian Premier League: 2007–08

Sarajevo

- Bosnian Premier League: 2014–15
- Bosnian Cup: 2013–14
