= Ivan Tatomirović =

Serbian footballer

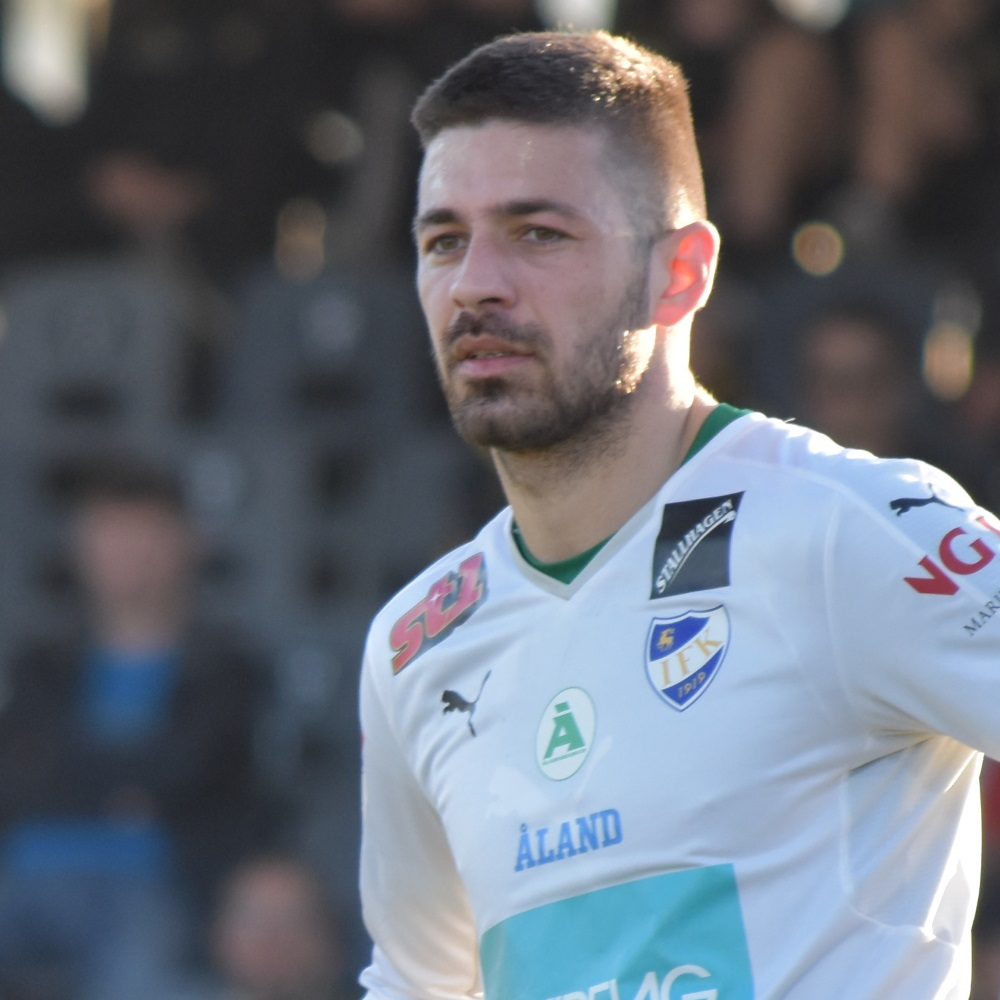
- Tatomirović playing for Mariehamn in 2018

Personal information
- Full name: Ivan Tatomirović
- Date of birth: 11 January 1989 (age 37)
- Place of birth: Smederevska Palanka, SR Serbia, Yugoslavia
- Height: 1.88 m (6 ft 2 in)
- Position: Centre back

Youth career
- –2008: Red Star Belgrade

Senior career*
Years	Team	Apps	(Gls)
2008–2011	Srem	79	(3)
2012–2015	Sarajevo	105	(3)
2016	HJK	23	(0)
2017	RoPS	27	(2)
2018–2019	Mariehamn	27	(1)
2019	Inter Zaprešić	28	(0)
2020–2023	Žalgiris	58	(4)
2023–2024	Kolubara	12	(0)
Total		359	(13)
- * Club domestic league appearances and goals

Ivan Tatomirović (Serbian Cyrillic: Иван Татомировић; born 11 January 1989) is a Serbian retired footballer who played as a centre-back.

== Career ==
Tatomirović started his career at second tier FK Srem before transferring to Bosnian Premier League side FK Sarajevo in January 2012. With Sarajevo he won the Premier League of Bosnia and Herzegovina in 2015 and earlier on, the Bosnian Cup in 2014. He left Sarajevo in December 2015.

In February 2016, Tatomirović signed a one-year plus an option year contract with Finnish club HJK Helsinki. He left Helsinki after the end of the season in 2016. On 29 March 2017, Tatomirović signed a one-year contract with RoPS Rovaniemi. He left the club in October 2017.

On 30 October 2017, IFK Mariehamn announced the signing of Tatomirović on a two-year contract for the 2018 season. He left Mariehamn on 4 January 2019. On 7 January 2019, he signed with Croatian First Football League club NK Inter Zaprešić on a free transfer.

In February 2020, he joined Lithuanian club FK Žalgiris.

== Personal life ==
He is the son-in-law of fellow professional footballer Predrag Pašić.

== Career statistics ==
=== Club ===
Appearances and goals by club, season and competition
Club	Season	League			National cup (Note: Includes Serbian Cup, Bosnia and Herzegovina Cup, Finnish Cup, Croatian Cup, Lithuanian Cup)		Continental		Other		Total	
Club	Season	Division	Apps	Goals	Apps	Goals	Apps	Goals	Apps	Goals	Apps	Goals
Srem	2008–09	Serbian First League	24	1	0	0	—		—		24	1
Srem	2009–10	Serbian First League	28	1	0	0	—		—		28	1
Srem	2010–11	Serbian First League	11	0	0	0	—		—		11	0
Srem	2011–12	Serbian First League	16	1	1	0	—		—		17	1
Srem	Total		79	3	1	0	—		—		80	3
Sarajevo	2011–12	Bosnian Premier League	11	1	—		—		—		11	1
Sarajevo	2012–13	Bosnian Premier League	29	1	3	0	6 (Note: Appearances in UEFA Europa League)	1	—		38	2
Sarajevo	2013–14	Bosnian Premier League	27	1	7	0	4	0	—		38	1
Sarajevo	2014–15	Bosnian Premier League	27	0	4	1	6	0	—		37	1
Sarajevo	2015–16	Bosnian Premier League	11	0	2	0	1 (Note: Appearance in UEFA Champions League)	0	—		14	0
Sarajevo	Total		105	3	16	1	17	1	—		138	5
HJK	2016	Veikkausliiga	23	0	4	0	6	0	4 (Note: Appearances in Finnish League Cup)	0	37	0
RoPS	2017	Veikkausliiga	27	2	0	0	—		—		27	2
Mariehamn	2018	Veikkausliiga	27	1	4	0	—		—		31	1
Inter Zaprešić	2018–19	Croatian Football League	9	0	1	0	—		—		10	0
Inter Zaprešić	2019–20	Croatian Football League	19	0	2	0	—		—		21	0
Inter Zaprešić	Total		28	0	3	0	—		—		31	0
Žalgiris	2020	A Lyga	18	3	3	0	2	0	1 (Note: Appearance in Lithuanian Supercup)	0	24	3
Žalgiris	2021	A Lyga	28	0	3	0	3 (Note: Two appearances in UEFA Champions League; one appearance in UEFA Europa Conference League)	0	1	0	35	0
Žalgiris	2022	A Lyga	12	1	3	0	1	0	—		16	1
Žalgiris	Total		58	4	9	0	6	0	2	0	75	4
Kolubara	2022–23	Serbian SuperLiga	5	0	—		—		—		5	0
Kolubara	2023–24	Serbian First League	7	0	1	0	—		—		8	0
Kolubara	Total		12	0	1	0	—		—		13	0
Career total			359	13	38	1	29	1	6	0	432	15

== Honours ==
Sarajevo

- Bosnian Premier League: 2014–15
- Bosnian Cup: 2013–14

Žalgiris

- A Lyga: 2020, 2021, 2022
- LFF Cup: 2021, 2022
- Lithuanian Supercup: 2020
