= Haris Duljević =

Bosnian footballer (born 1993)

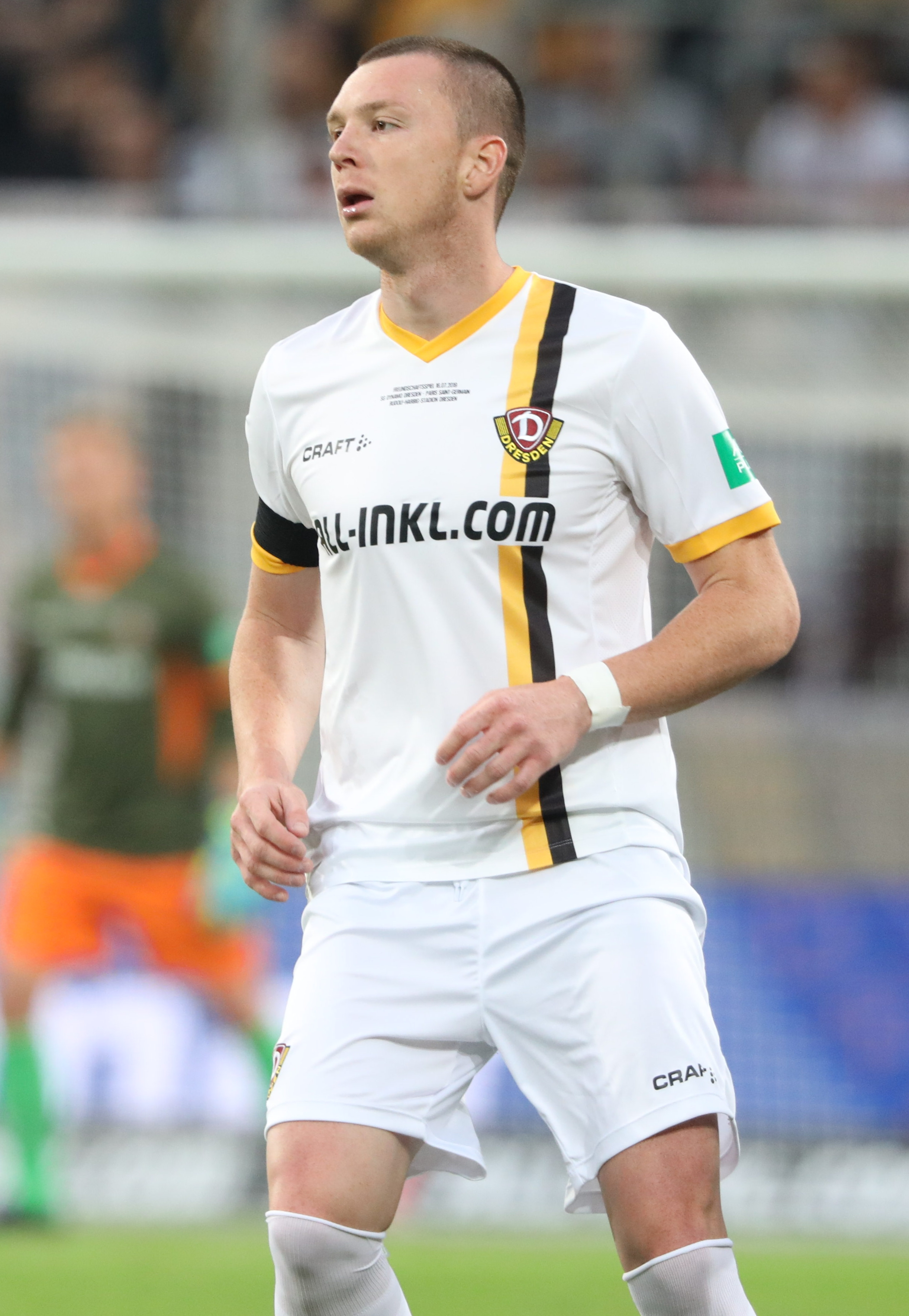
- Duljević playing for Dynamo Dresden in 2019

Personal information
- Date of birth: 16 November 1993 (age 32)
- Place of birth: Sarajevo, Bosnia and Herzegovina
- Height: 1.85 m (6 ft 1 in)
- Position: Winger

Youth career
- Novi Grad Sarajevo
- 2009–2011: Olimpic

Senior career*
Years	Team	Apps	(Gls)
2011	Čelik Zenica	4	(0)
2011–2014	Olimpic	50	(5)
2014–2017	Sarajevo	76	(7)
2017–2019	Dynamo Dresden	53	(3)
2019–2021	Nîmes	34	(0)
2021–2023	Hansa Rostock	41	(0)
2024	Sarajevo	3	(0)
2024–2025	Stal Rzeszów	15	(1)

International career
2012–2014	Bosnia and Herzegovina U21	12	(1)
2016–2022	Bosnia and Herzegovina	28	(1)
- * Club domestic league appearances and goals as of 4 May 2025

Haris Duljević (pronounced [xâːris dûːʎeʋitɕ]; born 16 November 1993) is a Bosnian professional footballer who plays as a winger.

Duljević started his professional career at Čelik Zenica, before joining Olimpic in 2011. Three years later, he switched to Sarajevo. In 2017, he moved to Dynamo Dresden. Two years later, Duljević was transferred to Nîmes. He signed with Hansa Rostock in 2021. In 2024, he went back to Sarajevo. Later that year, he joined Stal Rzeszów.

A former youth international for Bosnia and Herzegovina, Duljević made his senior international debut in 2016, earning over 20 caps until 2022.

== Club career ==
=== Early career ===
Duljević started playing football at a local club, before joining the youth setup of his hometown team Olimpic in 2009. He made his professional debut playing for Čelik Zenica against Olimpic on 10 April 2011 at the age of 17.

In March 2012, he returned to Olimpic. On 6 April 2013, he scored his first professional goal against Velež.

=== Sarajevo ===
In April 2014, Duljević switched to Sarajevo on a three-year deal. He made his official debut for the side in a UEFA Europa League qualifier against Haugesund on 17 July. On 7 August, he scored his first goal for Sarajevo in a UEFA Europa League qualifier against Atromitos. A week later, he made his league debut against Borac Banja Luka and managed to score a goal. He won his first trophy with the club on 30 May 2015, when they were crowned league champions.

In November, he was named team captain.

=== Dynamo Dresden ===
In August 2017, Duljević signed a three-year contract with German side Dynamo Dresden. He made his competitive debut for the club on 27 August against VfL Bochum. On 27 November, he scored his first goal for Dynamo Dresden in a triumph over Fortuna Düsseldorf.

=== Nîmes ===
In July 2019, Duljević was transferred to French outfit Nîmes for an undisclosed fee. He debuted officially for the team against Paris Saint-Germain on 11 August. On 10 February 2021, he scored his first goal for Nîmes in a Coupe de France game against Nice.

=== Hansa Rostock ===
In September, Duljević moved to Hansa Rostock on a two-year deal. He debuted competitively for the side against Schalke 04 on 25 September.

=== Later stage of career ===
In March 2024, Duljević came back to Sarajevo.

In November, he joined Polish outfit Stal Rzeszów.

== International career ==
Duljević was a member of the Bosnia and Herzegovina under-21 team under coach Vlado Jagodić.

In March 2016, he received his first senior call up, for friendly games against Luxembourg and Switzerland. He debuted against the former on 25 March.

On 8 September 2018, in a 2018–19 UEFA Nations League B match against Northern Ireland, Duljević scored his first senior international goal.

== Personal life ==
Duljević married his long-time girlfriend Sara in July 2019. Together they have two children, a daughter named Uma and a son named Džan.

== Career statistics ==
=== Club ===
As of match played 4 May 2025

Appearances and goals by club, season and competition
Club	Season	League			National cup (Note: Includes Bosnian Cup, DFB-Pokal, Coupe de France)		League cup (Note: Includes Coupe de la Ligue)		Continental		Total	
Club	Season	Division	Apps	Goals	Apps	Goals	Apps	Goals	Apps	Goals	Apps	Goals
Čelik Zenica	2010–11	Bosnian Premier League	4	0	0	0	–		–		4	0
Olimpic	2011–12	Bosnian Premier League	5	0	0	0	–		–		5	0
Olimpic	2012–13	Bosnian Premier League	25	1	5	0	–		–		30	1
Olimpic	2013–14	Bosnian Premier League	20	4	1	1	–		–		21	5
Olimpic	Total		50	5	6	1	–		–		56	6
Sarajevo	2014–15	Bosnian Premier League	24	3	4	1	–		6 (Note: Appearances in UEFA Europa League)	2	34	6
Sarajevo	2015–16	Bosnian Premier League	26	3	4	0	–		2 (Note: Appearances in UEFA Champions League)	0	32	3
Sarajevo	2016–17	Bosnian Premier League	26	1	5	1	–		–		31	2
Sarajevo	Total		76	7	13	2	–		8	2	97	11
Dynamo Dresden	2017–18	2. Bundesliga	28	2	1	0	–		–		29	2
Dynamo Dresden	2018–19	2. Bundesliga	25	1	1	1	–		–		26	2
Dynamo Dresden	Total		53	3	2	1	–		–		55	4
Nîmes	2019–20	Ligue 1	14	0	1	0	2	0	–		17	0
Nîmes	2020–21	Ligue 1	20	0	1	1	–		–		21	1
Nîmes	Total		34	0	2	1	2	0	–		38	1
Hansa Rostock	2021–22	2. Bundesliga	23	0	0	0	–		–		23	0
Hansa Rostock	2022–23	2. Bundesliga	18	0	1	0	–		–		19	0
Hansa Rostock	Total		41	0	1	0	–		–		42	0
Sarajevo	2023–24	Bosnian Premier League	3	0	–		–		–		3	0
Stal Rzeszów	2024–25	I liga	15	1	–		–		–		15	1
Career total			276	16	24	5	2	0	8	2	310	23

=== International ===
Appearances and goals by national team and year
National team	Year	Apps	Goals
Bosnia and Herzegovina
Bosnia and Herzegovina	2016	5	0
Bosnia and Herzegovina	2017	3	0
Bosnia and Herzegovina	2018	9	1
Bosnia and Herzegovina	2019	6	0
Bosnia and Herzegovina	2020	0	0
Bosnia and Herzegovina	2021	2	0
Bosnia and Herzegovina	2022	3	0
Total		28	1

Scores and results list Bosnia and Herzegovina's goal tally first, score column indicates score after each Duljević goal.

List of international goals scored by Haris Duljević
No.	Date	Venue	Cap	Opponent	Score	Result	Competition
1	8 September 2018	Windsor Park, Belfast, Northern Ireland	13	Northern Ireland	1–0	2–1	2018–19 UEFA Nations League B

== Honours ==
Sarajevo

- Bosnian Premier League: 2014–15
