= Matej Delač =

Croatian footballer (born 1992)

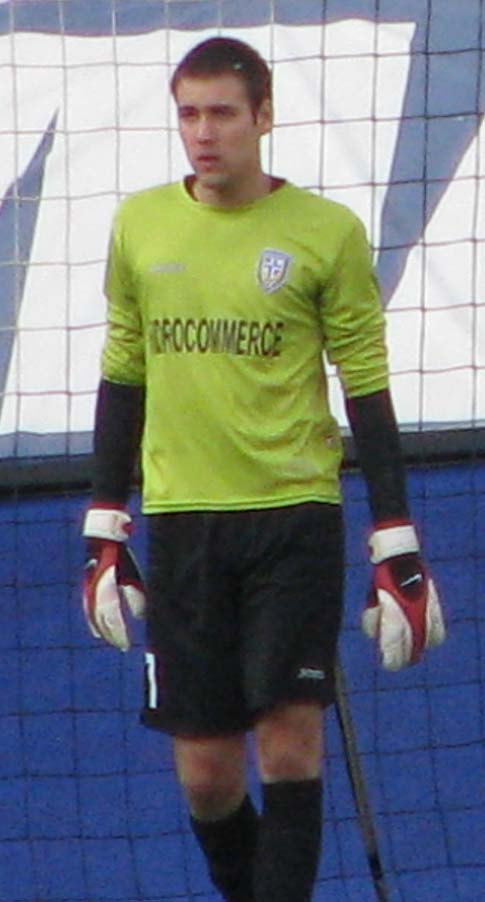
- Delač with Inter Zaprešić in 2009

Personal information
- Date of birth: 20 August 1992 (age 34)
- Place of birth: Gornji Vakuf, Bosnia and Herzegovina
- Height: 1.90 m (6 ft 3 in)
- Position: Goalkeeper

Team information
- Current team: Horsens
- Number: 1

Youth career
- 1998–2009: Inter Zaprešić

Senior career*
Years	Team	Apps	(Gls)
2009–2010	Inter Zaprešić	38	(0)
2010–2018	Chelsea	0	(0)
2010–2011	→ Vitesse (loan)	0	(0)
2011–2012	→ Dynamo České Budějovice (loan)	1	(0)
2012–2013	→ Vitória de Guimarães (loan)	0	(0)
2012–2013	→ Vitória de Guimarães II (loan)	1	(0)
2013	→ Inter Zaprešić (loan)	14	(0)
2013	→ Vojvodina (loan)	10	(0)
2014	→ Sarajevo (loan)	7	(0)
2014–2015	→ Arles-Avignon (loan)	11	(0)
2015–2016	→ Sarajevo (loan)	26	(0)
2016–2017	→ Excel Mouscron (loan)	28	(0)
2018–	Horsens	222	(0)

International career^{‡}
2007	Croatia U15	1	(0)
2008	Croatia U16	4	(0)
2008	Croatia U17	2	(0)
2008–2011	Croatia U19	10	(0)
2010–2013	Croatia U20	9	(0)
2010–2013	Croatia U21	9	(0)
- * Club domestic league appearances and goals as of 2 June 2026 ‡ National team caps and goals as of 19 November 2013

Matej Delač (pronounced [mǎtej dělatʃ]; born 20 August 1992) is a Croatian professional footballer who plays as a goalkeeper for Danish Superliga club Horsens.

== Club career ==
=== Inter Zaprešić ===
A product of Inter Zaprešić youth academy, Delač started to impress very early on and after only a few appearances for Croatia U-15 he attracted attention from bigger clubs across Europe. During summer 2008, Delač went on trial at Portuguese Primeira Liga club Benfica and came very close to joining them, but the two clubs could not agree terms so he stayed at Zaprešić.

He had his professional debut for Inter Zaprešić in the 2008–09 season on 22 February 2009 against NK Zagreb, becoming the youngest player ever to appear in the Croatian first division (at 16 years and 186 days of age). He impressed football pundits in his debut by miraculously saving a penalty from Davor Vugrinec in the 85th minute, contributing to Inter's 1–0 victory and becoming man of the match. Delač continued with good performances and finished the 2008–09 season with 15 appearances, as the club's first-choice goalkeeper.

=== Chelsea ===
On 11 September 2009, two days after Croatia's defeat at Wembley, Croatian news reports revealed that Delač had stayed in London for a medical examination and was on the verge of signing a pre-contract with Premier League club Chelsea. Reports claimed that Chelsea scouts had been following Delač's performances in the Croatian first division for months and that their Director of Football Frank Arnesen previously went to Zagreb to agree terms of the transfer.

It was announced at a press conference held by Inter on 17 September 2009 that Delač had indeed penned a five-year contract with Chelsea which will come into effect in the January 2011 transfer window. In the meantime, Delač continued playing at Inter, his wages were paid by Chelsea, and he was also expected to participate in training at Chelsea's training ground whenever his Prva HNL obligations allowed.

==== Loan to Vitesse ====
On 24 August 2010, Delač joined Chelsea's feeder club Vitesse on loan for the 2010–11 campaign. However, after being deployed as a back-up to Eloy Room and appearing on the bench for the majority of the campaign, Delač returned to Chelsea without making a single appearance for the Dutch side.

==== Loan to Dynamo České Budějovice ====
On 13 September 2011, Dynamo České Budějovice chairman Karel Poborský confirmed that Delač would join the club on loan for the rest of the season. However, on 4 January 2012, Delač was recalled by Chelsea after just making one appearance in a 4–0 league defeat against Viktoria Plzeň.

==== Loan to Vitória de Guimarães ====
On 17 July 2012, Delač joined Portuguese side Vitória de Guimarães on a season-long loan along with Chelsea team-mate Milan Lalkovič. However, after six months with the club, Delač had failed to make a first-team league appearance and therefore returned to Chelsea in January 2013. However, he made one appearance in an early round of the Portuguese Cup, which Vitória eventually won, making him a Cup winner.

==== Return to Inter Zaprešić ====
On 10 January 2013, Delač returned to boyhood club Inter Zaprešić on loan for the remainder of the 2012–13 campaign. On 15 February 2013, he made his Inter Zaprešić return in their 1–0 home defeat against Zadar. He went onto feature thirteen more times for the Croatian side in their unsuccessful relegation fight before returning to Chelsea.

==== Loan to Vojvodina ====
In July 2013, Delač joined Serbian side Vojvodina on a season-long loan. On 25 July 2013, he made his Vojvodina debut 3–1 victory against Hungarian side Honvéd in a UEFA Europa League qualifying tie. On 11 August 2013, he made his league debut for the Serbian side in their 0–0 draw with Donji Srem. Having established himself as a first choice keeper, Delač played an instrumental role in helping Vojvodina reach play-off round of 2013–14 UEFA Europa League, where Vojvodina lost to Moldovan side Sheriff Tiraspol. At the same time he quickly became a crowd favorite. Midway through the first half of the season, Delač lost his place as a starting keeper. By the end of December, he decided to cut his stay in Novi Sad short, and return to Chelsea.

==== Loan to Sarajevo ====
Preceding his return from Vojvodina, Delač joined Bosnian Premier League side Sarajevo on loan for the remainder of the season. On 1 March 2014, he made his Sarajevo debut in a 1–0 defeat against Čelik Zenica. A couple of weeks later, Delač registered his first clean sheet in Sarajevo's 2–0 away victory over Mladost Velika Obarska. He returned to Chelsea at the end of the campaign after appearing seven times for the Bosnian side.

==== Loan to Arles-Avignon ====
On 1 September 2014, Delač joined Ligue 2 side Arles-Avignon on loan for the 2014–15 campaign. On 12 September 2014, Delač made his debut for Arles-Avignon in their 1–0 league victory over Tours. Delač fell out of favour whilst at the French side and went onto make ten more league appearances before terminating his loan spell in January 2015.

==== Return to Sarajevo ====
On 27 February 2015, Delač returned to Sarajevo for the remainder of the 2014–15 campaign. On 14 March 2015, he marked his Sarajevo return with a clean sheet in their 0–0 draw with Borac Banja Luka. Delač went onto register seven more clean sheets, helping Sarajevo win their first league title since 2006.

On 7 August 2015, Delač's loan spell with Sarajevo was extended for a further season. On 26 October 2015, he suffered a serious anterior cruciate ligament injury, during the international break, therefore excluding him out Sarajevo's plans for the season.

==== Loan to Excel Mouscron ====
On 22 July 2016, Delač joined Belgian side Excel Mouscron on a season-long loan. On 17 September 2016, Delač made his Excel Mouscron debut in a 3–1 victory over Westerlo. On 27 October 2016, Delač registered his first clean sheet for Excel Mouscron in their 0–0 away draw with Waasland-Beveren.

=== AC Horsens ===
On 3 April 2018, it was announced that Delač would join Danish Superliga side Horsens in the summer of 2018 on a free transfer when his contract with Chelsea ended. Delač extended his contract until 2025 on August 18, 2022. Delač extended his contract with Horsens until 2027 on 22 December 2023.

== International career ==
After earning 8 caps for Croatia's U-17 and U-19 teams between 2007 and 2008, Delač was called up by Croatia manager Slaven Bilić on 30 August 2009 to join the squad as third-choice goalkeeper (behind Vedran Runje and Danijel Subašić) for their 2010 World Cup qualifiers against Belarus and England, breaking the record for the youngest Croatian player ever called up for international duty.

== Career statistics ==
As of match played 30 November 2025

Appearances and goals by club, season and competition
Club	Season	League			Cup (Note: Includes Czech Cup, Serbian Cup, Coupe de la Ligue, Bosnian Cup, Danish Cup)		Europe		Other		Total	
Club	Season	Division	Apps	Goals	Apps	Goals	Apps	Goals	Apps	Goals	Apps	Goals
Inter Zaprešić	2008–09	Prva HNL	15	0	1	0	—		—		16	0
Inter Zaprešić	2009–10	Prva HNL	23	0	1	0	—		—		24	0
Inter Zaprešić	Total		38	0	2	0	0	0	0	0	40	0
Chelsea	2010–11	Premier League	0	0	0	0	0	0	0	0	0	0
Chelsea	2011–12	Premier League	0	0	0	0	0	0	—		0	0
Chelsea	2012–13	Premier League	0	0	0	0	0	0	0	0	0	0
Chelsea	2013–14	Premier League	0	0	0	0	0	0	0	0	0	0
Chelsea	2014–15	Premier League	0	0	0	0	0	0	—		0	0
Chelsea	2015–16	Premier League	0	0	0	0	0	0	—		0	0
Chelsea	2016–17	Premier League	0	0	0	0	—		—		0	0
Chelsea	2017–18	Premier League	0	0	0	0	0	0	0	0	0	0
Chelsea	Total		0	0	0	0	0	0	0	0	0	0
Vitesse (loan)	2010–11	Eredivisie	0	0	0	0	—		—		0	0
České Budějovice (loan)	2011–12	Czech First League	1	0	4	0	—		—		5	0
Vitória de Guimarães (loan)	2012–13	Primeira Liga	0	0	0	0	—		—		0	0
Vitória de Guimarães B (loan)	2012–13	Segunda Liga	1	0	—		—		—		1	0
Inter Zaprešić (loan)	2012–13	Prva Liga	14	0	0	0	—		—		14	0
Vojvodina (loan)	2013–14	Serbian SuperLiga	10	0	2	0	6 (Note: Appearances in the UEFA Europa League)	0	—		18	0
Sarajevo (loan)	2013–14	Bosnian Premier League	7	0	0	0	—		—		7	0
Arles-Avignon (loan)	2014–15	Ligue 2	11	0	2	0	—		—		13	0
Sarajevo (loan)	2014–15	Bosnian Premier League	14	0	1	0	—		—		15	0
Sarajevo (loan)	2015–16	Bosnian Premier League	12	0	0	0	—		—		12	0
Sarajevo (loan)	Total		70	0	9	0	6	0	0	0	85	0
Excel Mouscron (loan)	2016–17	Belgian First Division A	23	0	0	0	—		5 (Note: Appearances in the Belgian First Division A European play-offs)	0	28	0
AC Horsens	2018–19	Superliga	27	0	0	0	—		2 (Note: Appearances in the Superliga relegation play-offs)	0	29	0
AC Horsens	2019–20	Superliga	21	0	3	0	—		0	0	24	0
AC Horsens	2020–21	Superliga	31	0	1	0	—		0	0	32	0
AC Horsens	2021–22	Danish 1st Division	29	0	0	0	—		0	0	29	0
AC Horsens	2022–23	Superliga	27	0	0	0	—		0	0	27	0
AC Horsens	2023–24	Danish 1st Division	27	0	0	0	—		0	0	27	0
AC Horsens	2024–25	Danish 1st Division	26	0	0	0	—		0	0	26	0
AC Horsens	2025–26	Danish 1st Division	18	0	1	0	—		0	0	19	0
Total			231	0	6	0	0	0	7	0	238	0
Career total			340	0	18	0	6	0	7	0	371	0

== Honours ==
Vitória de Guimarães

- Taça de Portugal: 2012–13

Sarajevo

- Bosnian Premier League: 2014–15
- Bosnian Cup: 2013–14
