= Miloš Stojčev =

Serbian footballer

Personal information
- Full name: Miloš Stojčev
- Date of birth: 19 January 1987 (age 39)
- Place of birth: Belgrade, SFR Yugoslavia
- Height: 1.75 m (5 ft 9 in)
- Position: Midfielder

Youth career
- Red Star Belgrade

Senior career*
Years	Team	Apps	(Gls)
2005–2007	Red Star Belgrade	0	(0)
2005–2006	→ Sopot (loan)	16	(3)
2006	→ Grbalj (loan)	0	(0)
2007	→ Bežanija (loan)	12	(1)
2007–2008	Vojvodina	8	(0)
2008–2010	Borac Čačak	58	(2)
2011	Sporting Kansas City	12	(0)
2012	Akzhayik	20	(4)
2013	Leotar	13	(4)
2013	Atyrau	13	(1)
2013–2015	Sarajevo	40	(6)
2015–2017	Atromitos	30	(2)
2017	→ Veria (loan)	12	(1)
2017–2018	Platanias	8	(0)
2018–2019	Tuzla City	23	(1)
2019–2021	Voždovac	69	(10)
2022	Železničar Pančevo	16	(1)
2022–2023	Grafičar Beograd	26	(2)

Managerial career
- 2025: Grafičar Beograd (youth)
- 2025–: Red Star Belgrade (assistant)
- * Club domestic league appearances and goals as of 25 June 2023

Miloš Stojčev (Serbian Cyrillic: Милош Стојчев; born 19 January 1987) is a Serbian-Montenegrin coach and a former professional footballer who played as a midfielder.

== Club career ==
=== Europe ===
Born in Belgrade, Stojčev started playing football in the youth teams of Red Star Belgrade. In 2006, he joined Serbian SuperLiga squad of FK Bežanija, another club from the capital Belgrade. The following season he signed for the famous Novi Sad club FK Vojvodina where he had little chances to show all his capacities and played only eight games without scoring a goal. Another Superliga club, FK Borac Čačak was his next challenge. In his first season there he got to be quite an influential player, having played 26 league matches scoring one goal, and having the opportunity to play in the UEFA Cup where his team, after beating FC Dacia Chişinău and Lokomotiv Sofia in the previous rounds, lost to Ajax. While with Borac Čačak he appeared in 58 league matches and scored 2 goals, playing primarily as a left midfielder.

=== North America ===
In February 2011 he went on trial at Sporting Kansas City. After impressing during his trial stint, he was signed by Sporting on 16 March 2011. He made his debut for his new team on 19 March 2011 in their first game of the 2011 MLS season, a 3-2 win over Chivas USA.

Sporting Kansas City waived Stojčev on November 23, 2011

=== Return to Europe ===
He joined FC Akzhayik for the 2012 season. He then played for Premier League of Bosnia and Herzegovina side FK Leotar. He returned to the Kazakhstan Premier League playing for Atyrau.

He joined Sarajevo for the 2013–14 season.

Sarajevo midfielder Stojčev told SDNA that he wants to clinch his potential transfer to Atromitos soon. Atromitos are in negotiations with Sarajevo over the transfer of the 28-year-old midfielder to reinforce their squad further in the middle of the park. Stojcev wants to see this transfer completed as soon as possible and speaking to SDNA the 28-year-old midfielder confirmed his wish to join the Greek club. “I'm one and a half year at Sarajevo and I think that this is the time to make the next move in my career. Atromitos are very interested and personally I want to play at this club and in the Super League Greece. I'm an important member of Sarajevo squad, however I'm 28 years old and my club has promised not to prevent me from playing at a higher level in my career. I know that the offer has been described as not good enough but I hope that a deal can be reached soon,” Stojcev told SDNA. On 10 February 2016, thanks to an excellent strike by Stojcev, Atromitos won 1-0 against Panathinaikos and advanced to Greek Cup semi finals, after first leg's goalless draw.

On 31 August 2017, Stojčev signed a year contract with Platanias F.C. for an undisclosed fee. On 12 April 2018, due to imminent demotion to Football League, the experienced midfielder was released from struggling Platanias, even before the end of 2017-18 Super League.

On 4 June 2018, Stojčev signed a two-year contract with newly promoted Premier League of Bosnia and Herzegovina club FK Tuzla City, at that time still known by the name of "FK Sloga Simin Han". He scored his first goal for Tuzla on 13 April 2019, in a 1–1 home draw against FK Radnik Bijeljina.

In June 2019, Stojčev signed a contract with Serbian SuperLiga club FK Voždovac.

== Career statistics ==
As of match played 29 April 2019

Club performance			League		Cup		Continental		Total	
Season	Club	League	Apps	Goals	Apps	Goals	Apps	Goals	Apps	Goals
2013–14	Sarajevo	Bosnian Premier League	10	2	6	2	–		16	4
2014–15	Sarajevo	Bosnian Premier League	28	3	4	1	6	1	38	5
2015–16	Sarajevo	Bosnian Premier League	2	1	0	0	2	0	4	1
2015–16	Atromitos	Super League Greece	23	2	5	1	–		28	3
2016–17	Atromitos	Super League Greece	7	0	2	0	–		9	0
2016–17	Veria	Super League Greece	12	1	0	0	–		12	1
2017–18	Platanias	Super League Greece	8	0	2	0	–		10	0
2018–19	Tuzla City	Bosnian Premier League	23	1	1	0	–		24	1
2019–20	Voždovac	Serbian SuperLiga	0	0	0	0	–		0	0
Career total			113	10	20	4	8	1	141	15

== Honours ==
Sarajevo

- Bosnian Premier League: 2014–15
- Bosnian Cup: 2013–14
