= Ahmad Kalasi =

Syrian footballer (born 1990)

Personal information
- Full name: Ahmad Kalasi
- Date of birth: 18 July 1990 (age 36)
- Place of birth: Aleppo, Syria
- Height: 1.79 m (5 ft 10 in)
- Position: Right back

Team information
- Current team: Al-Ittihad

Youth career
- Al-Ittihad

Senior career*
Years	Team	Apps	(Gls)
2008–2014	Al-Ittihad		(3)
2013–2014	→ Al-Shorta (loan)		(4)
2014	Naft Maysan		
2014–2016	FK Sarajevo	20	(1)
2016–2022	Al-Ittihad		

International career^{‡}
2006–2007	Syria U-17		
2007–2008	Syria U-20		
2009–2012	Syria U-23		
2008–2016	Syria	12	(1)
- * Club domestic league appearances and goals ‡ National team caps and goals as of 17 June 2024

Ahmad Kalasi (Arabic: أحمد كلاسي; born 18 July 1990) is a Syrian footballer who plays for Al-Ittihad in the Syrian Premier League.

== Club career ==
Ahmad began his professional career in 2008 with Al-Ittihad.

After spending a five-seasons spell with Al-Ittihad in Syria, he joined Al-Shorta in 2013 on loan. In 2014, he played in the Iraqi Premier League with Naft Maysan.

On 29 July 2014 he moved to Europe and joined Bosnian top-flight side FK Sarajevo. He signed a contract until 2017.

== International career ==
From 2006 to 2008, he played for the Syria national under-17 football team and the Syria national under-20 football team. He was part of the squad that participated in the FIFA U-17 World Cup 2007 in South Korea. He played in one match in the tournament, in a 0–0 draw against Argentina. He was also member of the squad that participated in the 2008 AFC U-19 Championship.

He was part of the Syria national football team in the 2008 WAFF Championship.

== International goals ==
Scores and results table. Syria's goal tally first:

Ahmad Kallasi: International goals
No.	Date	Venue	Opponent	Score	Result	Competition
1	24 March 2016	Seeb, Oman	Cambodia	3–0	6–0	2018 FIFA World Cup qualification

== Career statistics ==
As of 15 May 2016

Club performance			League		Cup		Continental		Total	
Season	Club	League	Apps	Goals	Apps	Goals	Apps	Goals	Apps	Goals
Bosnia and Herzegovina			League		Cup		Europe		Total	
2014–15	FK Sarajevo	Premijer liga BiH	10	1	3	0	0	0	13	1
2015–16	FK Sarajevo	Premijer liga BiH	13	0	1	0	0	0	14	0
2014–15	FK Sarajevo Total		23	1	4	0	0	0	27	1

== Honours ==
=== Club ===
Al-Ittihad

- Syrian Cup: 2011
- AFC Cup: 2010

FK Sarajevo

- Premier League of Bosnia and Herzegovina: 2014–15

=== National team ===
- FIFA U-17 World Cup 2007: Round of 16
