= Dejan Bandović =

Bosnian footballer

Personal information
- Full name: Dejan Bandović
- Date of birth: 11 June 1983 (age 43)
- Place of birth: Sarajevo, SFR Yugoslavia
- Height: 1.85 m (6 ft 1 in)
- Position: Goalkeeper

Senior career*
Years	Team	Apps	(Gls)
2004–2007	Posušje	??	(??)
2007–2011	Široki Brijeg	68	(0)
2011–2012	Velež Mostar	13	(0)
2012–2015	Sarajevo	64	(0)
2015–2019	Olimpik	81	(0)
Total		226	(0)
- * Club domestic league appearances and goals

Dejan Bandović (born 11 June 1983) is a Bosnian retired professional football goalkeeper.

In his career, Bandović played for HŠK Posušje, NK Široki Brijeg, FK Velež Mostar, FK Sarajevo and FK Olimpik.

== Club career ==
From 2004 to 2007 Bandović played for HŠK Posušje, before joining NK Široki Brijeg in June 2007. He stayed at Široki until 2011, before leaving the club to sign for FK Velež Mostar, where he stayed for one season.

In June 2012, Bandović signed for FK Sarajevo. With Sarajevo, he won the 2013–14 Bosnian Cup and the 2014–15 Premier League of Bosnia and Herzegovina. After his contract with Sarajevo expired in 2015, he signed a 1-year contract with Iranian Siah Jamegan F.C.

However, he ended up playing the 2015–16 season in FK Olimpik where he had played until May 2019, when he decided to finish his football career. He had a farewell match on 25 May 2019, in which Olimpik beat FK Rudar Kakanj 3–1 in a First League of FBiH game.

== International career ==
Bandović represented the Bosnia and Herzegovina U19 national team in 2001.

On 13 May 2014, first team national head coach Safet Sušić invited Bandović to a wider selection of the Bosnia and Herzegovina national football team for the 2014 FIFA World Cup, but he got dropped off the final list.

== Cener affair ==
Bandović came into public focus in May 2017, when he refused the bribe of 10,000 KM (around 5000 €) offered by manager Sanel Klopić to "defend less than perfectly" in the upcoming relegation playoff match against NK Metalleghe-BSI from Jajce. Having recorded the conversation on an audio tape, Bandović published it to the media and submitted it to the Football Federation of Bosnia and Herzegovina. Bandović later explained he decided to record the conversation after Klopić had approached him several times with the same demand. The Football Federation of Bosnia and Herzegovina immediately took over the investigation, eventually submitting it to the national public persecution office. The match against Metalleghe ended up in a 1–1 draw, and both clubs were eventually relegated to the First League of the Federation of Bosnia and Herzegovina.

Bandović was praised for his role in what became known as the "Cener affair". ("Cener" means tenner, i.e. the ten-thousand figure). In an interview, he stated "I can't do that... I'm 33 now and I don't want a spot on my honour on the end of my career. When I finish my career, I want to turn back and say that I've done my job fairly and honestly".

== Career statistics ==
=== Club ===
Club performance			League		Cup		Continental		Total	
Club	Season	League	Apps	Goals	Apps	Goals	Apps	Goals	Apps	Goals
Sarajevo	2012–13	Bosnian Premier League	28	0	3	0	2	0	33	0
Sarajevo	2013–14	Bosnian Premier League	22	0	8	0	4	0	34	0
Sarajevo	2014–15	Bosnian Premier League	15	0	2	0	6	0	23	0
Sarajevo	Total		65	0	13	0	12	0	90	0
Career total			65	0	13	0	12	0	90	0

== Honours ==
=== Club ===
Sarajevo

- Bosnian Premier League: 2014–15
- Bosnian Cup: 2013–14

Veteranos Fernão Ferro

- Tribute Game: 29.July.2022, in Apple Stadium, Sesimbra, Portugal
