= Krste Velkoski =

Macedonian footballer (born 1988)

Personal information
- Date of birth: 20 February 1988 (age 38)
- Place of birth: Struga, SR Macedonia, SFR Yugoslavia
- Height: 1.79 m (5 ft 10 in)
- Position: Striker

Senior career*
Years	Team	Apps	(Gls)
2006–2008	Rabotnički	56	(14)
2008–2010	Metalurg	32	(6)
2010	Ceahlăul	8	(1)
2010–2011	Enosis Neon Paralimni	11	(0)
2011–2013	Rabotnički	92	(41)
2014–2016	Sarajevo	54	(25)
2016–2017	Incheon United	24	(4)
2017	Nakhon Ratchasima	17	(3)
2017–2022	Sarajevo	127	(28)
2022–2023	Rabotnički	42	(10)
2024–2025	Makedonija G.P.	14	(2)
Total		477	(134)

International career
	Macedonia U17	3	(1)
	Macedonia U19	3	(0)
2009–2010	Macedonia U21	3	(0)
2014–2021	North Macedonia	15	(0)
- * Club domestic league appearances and goals

Krste Velkoski (Macedonian: Крсте Велкоски; born 20 February 1988) is a Macedonian former professional footballer who played as a striker.

== Club career ==
Velkoski signed a three-year contract with Enosis Neon Paralimni on 18 June 2010. However, the club mutually agreed to terminate his contract on 14 December. He signed a two-year contract with his former club Rabotnički in January 2011 and holds the record as top scorer in UEFA Club Competitions for the club.

In January 2014, Velkoski joined Bosnian Premier League club Sarajevo signing a 2 1/2-year contract. After playing for Sarajevo, he played for Incheon United and Nakhon Ratchasima. In 2017, Velkoski returned to Sarajevo.

== International career ==
In March 2014, Velkoski made his senior debut for Macedonia in a friendly match against Latvia. He has played on 12 occasions in total, scoring no goals. His last international was a Nations League match against Gibraltar in November 2018.

== Career statistics ==
=== Club ===
Appearances and goals by club, season and competition
Club	Season	League			National cup (Note: Includes Macedonian Cup, Bosnian Cup, Korean FA Cup, Thai FA Cup)		Continental		Total	
Club	Season	Division	Apps	Goals	Apps	Goals	Apps	Goals	Apps	Goals
Rabotnički	2005–06	Macedonian First League	8	2			—		8	2
Rabotnički	2006–07	Macedonian First League	25	7			6 (Note: Five appearances and one goal in UEFA Champions League; one appearance in UEFA Cup)	1	31	8
Rabotnički	2007–08	Macedonian First League	19	5			6 (Note: Appearance(s) in UEFA Cup)	2	25	7
Rabotnički	2008–09	Macedonian First League	4	0			2 (Note: Appearance(s) in UEFA Champions League)	1	6	1
Rabotnički	Total		56	14			14	4	70	18
Metalurg	2008–09	Macedonian First League	18	4			—		18	4
Metalurg	2009–10	Macedonian First League	14	2			—		14	2
Metalurg	Total		32	6			—		32	6
Ceahlaul Piatra-Neamt	2009–10	Liga I	8	1			—		8	1
Enosis Neon Paralimni	2010–11	Cypriot First Division	11	0			—		11	0
Rabotnički	2010–11	Macedonian First League	15	6			—		15	6
Rabotnički	2011–12	Macedonian First League	31	8	5	3	8 (Note: Appearance(s) in UEFA Europa League)	2	44	13
Rabotnički	2012–13	Macedonian First League	28	13			—		28	13
Rabotnički	2013–14	Macedonian First League	18	14	2	1	—		20	15
Rabotnički	Total		92	41	7	4	8	2	107	47
Sarajevo	2013–14	Bosnian Premier League	11	8	6	2	—		17	10
Sarajevo	2014–15	Bosnian Premier League	25	11	5	3	6	0	36	14
Sarajevo	2015–16	Bosnian Premier League	18	6	2	1	2	0	22	7
Sarajevo	Total		54	25	13	6	8	0	75	31
Incheon United	2016	K League Classic	24	4	2	0	—		26	4
Nakhon Ratchasima	2017	Thai League 1	17	3	0	0	—		17	3
Sarajevo	2017–18	Bosnian Premier League	32	12	1	0	—		33	12
Sarajevo	2018–19	Bosnian Premier League	31	11	8	3	4	0	43	14
Sarajevo	2019–20	Bosnian Premier League	19	2	1	0	4 (Note: Two appearances in UEFA Champions League; two appearances in UEFA Europa League)	0	24	2
Sarajevo	2020–21	Bosnian Premier League	26	3	5	1	3 (Note: One appearance in UEFA Champions League; two appearances in UEFA Europa League)	0	34	4
Sarajevo	2021–22	Bosnian Premier League	19	0	5	1	2 (Note: Appearance(s) in UEFA Europa Conference League)	0	27	1
Sarajevo	Total		127	28	20	5	13	0	161	33
Rabotnički	2022–23	Macedonian First League	28	8	0	0	—		28	8
Rabotnički	2023–24	Macedonian First League	14	2	2	0	—		16	2
Rabotnički	Total		42	10	2	0	—		44	10
Makedonija G.P.	2023–24	Macedonian First League	14	2	2	1	—		16	3
Makedonija G.P.	2024–25	Macedonian Second League			2	1	—		2	1
Makedonija G.P.	Total		14	2	4	2	—		18	4
Career total			477	134	48	17	43	6	569	157

=== International ===
Appearances and goals by national team and year
National team	Year	Apps	Goals
North Macedonia
North Macedonia	2014	6	0
North Macedonia	2015	4	0
North Macedonia	2016	0	0
North Macedonia	2017	0	0
North Macedonia	2018	2	0
North Macedonia	2019	0	0
North Macedonia	2020	2	0
North Macedonia	2021	1	0
Total		15	0

== Honours ==
Rabotnički

- Macedonian First League: 2007–08, 2013–14
- Macedonian Football Cup: 2007–08, 2013–14

Sarajevo

- Bosnian Premier League: 2014–15, 2018–19, 2019–20
- Bosnian Cup: 2013–14, 2018–19, 2020–21
