= Radoš Protić =

Serbian footballer

Personal information
- Date of birth: 31 January 1987 (age 39)
- Place of birth: Sremska Mitrovica, SFR Yugoslavia
- Height: 1.83 m (6 ft 0 in)
- Position: Left-back

Senior career*
Years	Team	Apps	(Gls)
2005–2010	Rad	21	(0)
2008–2009	→ Teleoptik (loan)	15	(0)
2009	→ Leotar (loan)	7	(0)
2010	→ Mačva Šabac (loan)	14	(1)
2010–2011	Jagodina	31	(0)
2012–2013	Oleksandriya	18	(0)
2013–2014	Novi Pazar	23	(0)
2014–2015	Sarajevo	8	(0)
2015	→ Novi Pazar (loan)	10	(0)
2016	Rad	12	(1)
2016–2017	Mladost Lučani	26	(1)
2017	Mačva Šabac	18	(2)
2018–2020	Kisvárda	60	(0)
2020–2021	Inđija	32	(0)
2021	Železničar Pančevo	12	(1)
2022–2023	Radnički Sremska Mitrovica	39	(1)
2024	Sloven Ruma		
- * Club domestic league appearances and goals as of 26 December 2023

Radoš Protić (Serbian Cyrillic: Радош Протић; born 31 January 1987) is a Serbian retired footballer.

== Club career ==
On 28 June 2021, he signed with Železničar Pančevo.

== Career statistics ==
As of 15 August 2015

Club performance			League		Cup		Continental		Total	
Season	Club	League	Apps	Goals	Apps	Goals	Apps	Goals	Apps	Goals
Bosnia and Herzegovina			League		Cup		Europe		Total	
2014–15	FK Sarajevo	Premijer liga BiH	8	0	5	0	4	0	17	0
2015–16	FK Sarajevo	Premijer liga BiH	0	0	0	0	0	0	0	0
2014–15	FK Sarajevo Total		8	0	5	0	4	0	17	0

== Honours ==
Sarajevo

- Premier League of Bosnia and Herzegovina: 2014–15
