= Faris Handžić =

Bosnian footballer

Personal information
- Date of birth: 27 May 1995 (age 31)
- Place of birth: Sarajevo, Bosnia and Herzegovina
- Height: 1.72 m (5 ft 7 1/2 in)
- Position: Midfielder

Team information
- Current team: FK UNIS Vogošća

Youth career
- –2012: Sarajevo

Senior career*
Years	Team	Apps	(Gls)
2012–2014	Sarajevo	14	(0)
2015	Westerlo	3	(0)
2016	Dukla Banská Bystrica	13	(0)
2017	Velež Mostar	22	(2)
2018	Igman Konjic	25	(0)
2019	Vinogradar	0	(0)
2019–2021	Olimpik	23	(1)
2021–2022	Novi Pazar	6	(0)
2022	Orašje	12	(2)
2022–2023	Budućnost Banovići	10	(0)
2023–2025	Goražde	23	(4)
2024	Rudar Kakanj	12	(0)
2024–2025	FK Romanija Pale	16	(0)
2025	NK Kolina		
2025–2026	Bosna Visoko		
2026–	FK UNIS Vogošća		

International career^{‡}
2011	Bosnia and Herzegovina U17	3	(0)
2012–2013	Bosnia and Herzegovina U18	4	(0)
2013	Bosnia and Herzegovina U19	3	(0)
- * Club domestic league appearances and goals as of 1 March 2025 ‡ National team caps and goals as of 22 August 2013

Faris Handžić (born 27 May 1995) is a Bosnian professional footballer who plays as a midfielder for FK UNIS Vogošća.

== Club career ==
As a youth player, Handžić trialed for the youth academies of Spanish La Liga side Espanyol and one of Italy's most successful clubs, Inter Milan. At the age of 16, he debuted for Bosnian Premier League club Sarajevo, one of the country's most successful teams, where he won the 2013–14 Bosnian Cup.

Before the second half of the 2014–15 season, Handžić signed with Westerlo in the Belgian top flight, where he made 3 league appearances. Before the second half of the 2015–16 season, he joined Slovak Second Division outfit Dukla Banská Bystrica. Before the second half of the 2016–17 season, Handžić signed with First League of FBiH club Velež Mostar.

In August 2019, he joined also First League of FBiH side Olimpik after playing for Vinogradar in the 3. HNL. On 26 May 2020, the 2019–20 First League of FBiH season ended abruptly due to the COVID-19 pandemic in Bosnia and Herzegovina and, by default, Handžić with Olimpik were crowned league champions and got promoted back to the Bosnian Premier League.

== International career ==
Handžić represented the Bosnia and Herzegovina U17 national team in 2011, making 3 caps for the team.

== Honours ==
Sarajevo

- Bosnian Cup: 2013–14
