= Aleksandar Malbašić =

Bosnian footballer

Personal information
- Date of birth: 8 September 1992 (age 34)
- Place of birth: Gradiška, Bosnia and Herzegovina
- Position: Midfielder

Team information
- Current team: FK Dubrave

Senior career*
Years	Team	Apps	(Gls)
2011–2012	Kozara Gradiška	14	(0)
2013–2014	Sloboda Mrkonjić Grad		
2013–2014	Jedinstvo Bihać	12	(4)
2014–2015	Borac Banja Luka	3	(0)
2015	Scarborough SC		
2016–2017	Borac Banja Luka	8	(0)
2016–2017	Sloboda Mrkonjić Grad	29	(8)
2017–2019	Metalleghe-BSI	35	(3)
2019–2020	Rudar Prijedor	5	(0)
2019–2020	Zvijezda Gradačac	1	(0)
2020–2023	Kozara Gradiška	81	(17)
2023–2025	Borac Kozarska Dubica	43	(5)
2025–	FK Dubrave		

International career
2014	Republika Srpska U23	1	(0)
- * Club domestic league appearances and goals

Aleksandar Malbašić (born September 8, 1992) is a Bosnian footballer who plays as a midfielder for FK Dubrave.

== Club career ==
=== Early career ===
Malbašić entered the professional ranks in 2011 by signing with Kozara Gradiška in the Premier League of Bosnia and Herzegovina. In 2013, he signed a contract with Sloboda Mrkonjić Grad in the First League of the Republika Srpska. Malbašić debuted in the 2013–14 Bosnia and Herzegovina Football Cup, where Sloboda Mrkonjić Grad defeated Travnik. His time with Sloboda was short-lived as he signed with Jedinstvo Bihać in the 2014 winter transfer market. The following season, he switched clubs to play in the country's top-tier league by signing with Borac Banja Luka.

=== Canada ===
In the summer of 2015, Malbašić played abroad in the Canadian Soccer League with Scarborough SC. In his debut season with Scarborough, the club failed to secure a playoff berth by finishing tenth in the league's first division.

=== Bosnia ===
After spending the summer months abroad in Canada, he returned to Banja Luka for the 2016–17 season. However, his second run with the club was cut short as he received an injury. Following his recovery from his injury, he left Banja Luka during the 2017 winter transfer market. After his release from Banja Luka, he was linked with a move to his former team, Kozara. Ultimately, he signed with his former team, Sloboda Mrkonjić Grad. Once the season concluded, he was linked with moves to Olimpik and Tekstilac Derventa.

Malbašić returned to the First League of Bosnia and Herzegovina to play for Metalleghe-BSI on December 12, 2017. He returned to Metalleghe for the following season. After a year and a half with Jajce, his contract was terminated as he signed with Rudar Prijedor. He parted ways with Rudar midway through the season to secure a contract with Zvijezda Gradačac. In 2020, he returned to his original club, Kozara Gradiška. After two seasons with Kozara, he signed with Borac Kozarska Dubica. In 2025, he signed with FK Dubrave in the Second League of the Republika Srpska.

== International career ==
Malbašić was selected to represent the Republika Srpska official under-23 football team against Udinese Calcio.
