= Miroljub Kostić =

Serbian footballer

Personal information
- Date of birth: 5 June 1988 (age 38)
- Place of birth: Niš, SFR Yugoslavia
- Height: 1.83 m (6 ft 0 in)
- Positions: Defensive midfielder; full-back

Team information
- Current team: Smederevo 1924
- Number: 5

Senior career*
Years	Team	Apps	(Gls)
2006–2007	Radan Lebane		
2007–2011	Sinđelić Niš	(Note: Including stats for the 2010–11 season only)30	(4)
2011–2013	Jagodina	36	(1)
2013	→ Radnik Surdulica (loan)	13	(0)
2014	Olimpija Ljubljana	17	(0)
2014–2015	Sarajevo	4	(0)
2015	→ Novi Pazar (loan)	35	(2)
2016–2017	Borac Čačak	56	(1)
2018	Napredak Kruševac	33	(1)
2019	AGMK	6	(0)
2019–2020	Radnik Surdulica	23	(0)
2020–2021	Napredak Kruševac	35	(1)
2021–2022	Železničar Pančevo	32	(4)
2023–	Smederevo 1924	35	(2)
- * Club domestic league appearances and goals as of 10 October 2024

Miroljub Kostić (Serbian Cyrillic: Мирољуб Костић; born 5 June 1988) is a Serbian footballer who plays for Smederevo 1924.

== Honours ==
Jagodina

- Serbian Cup: 2012–13
