= Mladen Jurčević =

Bosnian-Herzegovinian footballer

Personal information
- Date of birth: 4 March 1983 (age 43)
- Place of birth: Travnik, Bosnia and Herzegovina
- Height: 1.74 m (5 ft 8 1/2 in)
- Position: Defender

Senior career*
Years	Team	Apps	(Gls)
–2002	Vitez		
2003	Čelik		
2003–2006	Varteks	25	(0)
2006–2009	Čelik	61	(1)
2009–2011	Šibenik	17	(0)
2011	Vitez		
2012–2013	Široki Brijeg	5	(0)
2013–2015	Vitez	36	(2)
2015–2018	FC Red Boys Aspelt		
- * Club domestic league appearances and goals as of 10 August 2010

Mladen Jurčević (born 4 March 1983 in Travnik) is a Bosnian-Herzegovinian football midfielder playing for HNK Šibenik.

== Club career ==
Jurčević began his career with NK Vitez in the First League of Bosnia and Herzegovina. He played for Croatian Prva HNL club NK Varteks and Bosnian-Herzegovinian club NK Čelik Zenica.
