= Bojan Puzigaća =

Bosnian football manager (born 1985)

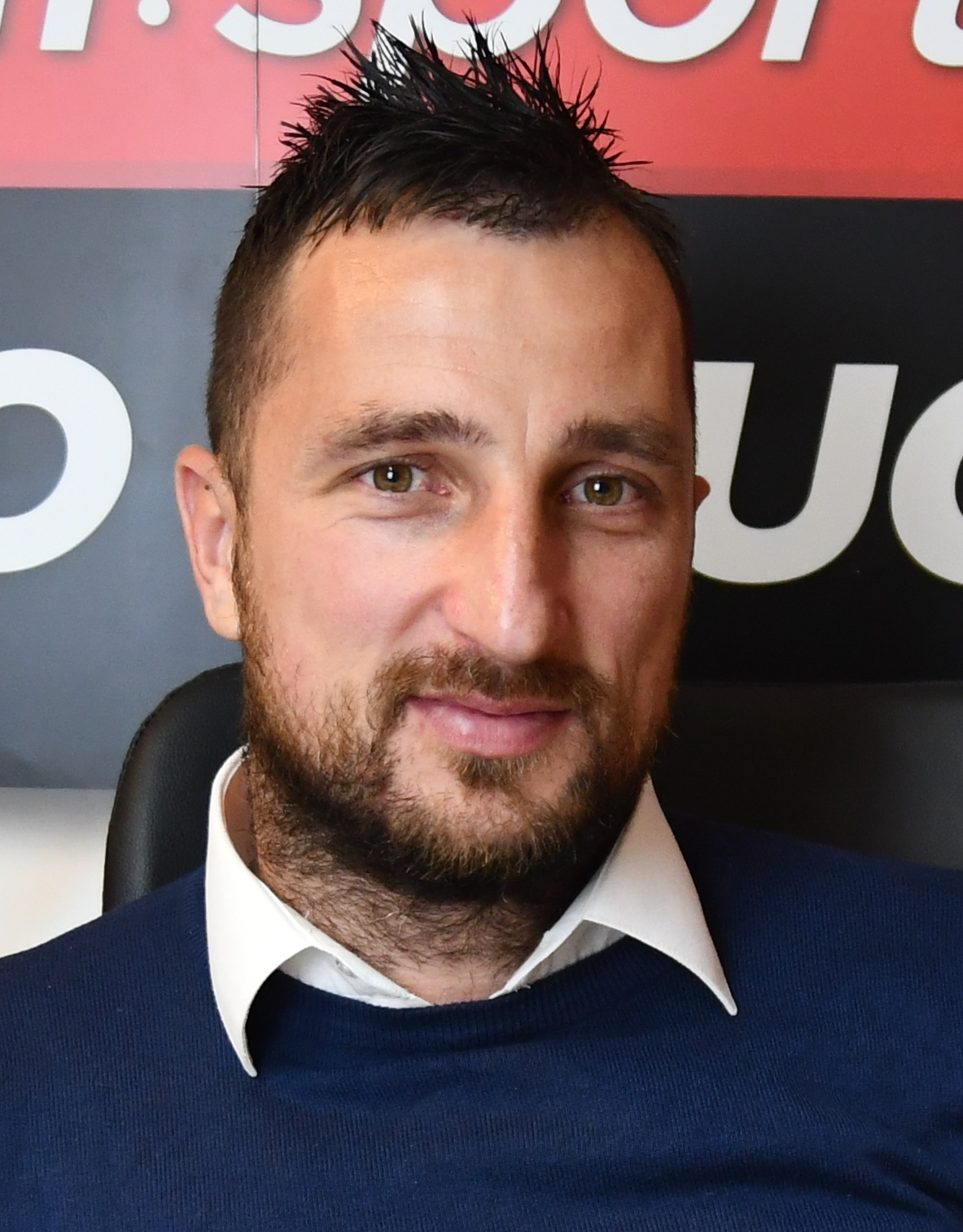
- Puzigaća in 2021

Personal information
- Date of birth: 10 May 1985 (age 41)
- Place of birth: Drvar, SFR Yugoslavia
- Height: 1.88 m (6 ft 2 in)
- Position: Left-back

Team information
- Current team: BSK Banja Luka (manager)

Senior career*
Years	Team	Apps	(Gls)
2006–2009	Borac Banja Luka	41	(5)
2009	Čelik Zenica	10	(1)
2010	Borac Banja Luka	23	(2)
2011–2013	Cracovia	28	(0)
2013–2015	Sarajevo	52	(14)
2016	Voždovac	11	(0)
2017–2018	Borac Banja Luka	36	(3)
2018–2021	Krupa	47	(1)
Total		248	(26)

Managerial career
- 2023–2024: BSK Banja Luka
- 2025: BSK Banja Luka
- 2025: Radnički 1923
- 2026: Kabel
- 2026–: BSK Banja Luka
- * Club domestic league appearances and goals

Bojan Puzigaća (Serbian Cyrillic: Бојан Пузигаћа; born 10 May 1985) is a Bosnian professional football manager and former player who played as a left-back. He is the current manager of Bosnian Premier League club BSK Banja Luka.

== Managerial statistics ==
As of match played 21 November 2026

Managerial record by team and tenure
Team	From	To	Record							
Team	From	To	G	W	D	L	GF	GA	GD	Win %
BSK Banja Luka	1 August 2023	10 June 2024	34	13	5	16	52	46	+6	38.24
BSK Banja Luka	5 August 2025	22 October 2025	11	8	2	1	22	9	+13	72.73
Radnički 1923	10 November 2025	30 December 2025	7	3	2	2	9	8	+1	42.86
Kabel	1 January 2026	10 March 2026	4	0	1	3	0	7	−7	0.00
BSK Banja Luka	27 June 2026	Present	15	4	5	6	24	26	−2	26.67
Total			71	28	15	28	107	96	+11	39.44

== Honours ==
=== Player ===
Borac Banja Luka

- First League of RS: 2016–17
- Bosnian Cup: 2009–10

Sarajevo

- Bosnian Premier League: 2014–15
- Bosnian Cup: 2013–14

Krupa

- First League of RS: 2019–20
