= Ševko Okić =

Bosnian footballer

Personal information
- Full name: Ševko Okić
- Date of birth: 26 July 1988 (age 38)
- Place of birth: Gračanica, SFR Yugoslavia
- Height: 1.78 m (5 ft 10 in)
- Position: Striker

Senior career*
Years	Team	Apps	(Gls)
2007–2008	Rudar Labin	25	(6)
2008–2010	Istra Pula	41	(7)
2010–2014	Velež Mostar	110	(32)
2014–2016	Sarajevo	46	(10)
2016–2018	Radnik Bijeljina	39	(3)
2018–2020	Čelik Zenica	45	(5)
2020	Radnik Bijeljina	2	(0)
2020	Neretva		
2020-	HNK Zmaj Makarska		
- * Club domestic league appearances and goals

Ševko Okić (born 26 July 1988) is a Bosnian professional footballer who plays as a striker.

He previously played for Rudar Labin, Istra 1961, Velež Mostar, Sarajevo, Radnik Bijeljina and Čelik Zenica.

== Career statistics ==
=== Club ===
As of match played 1 March 2020.

Club	Season	League			Cup		Continental		Total	
Club	Season	Division	Apps	Goals	Apps	Goals	Apps	Goals	Apps	Goals
Rudar Labin	2007–08	3. HNL	25	6	0	0	—		25	6
Istra 1961	2008–09	2. HNL	24	7	1	0	—		25	7
Istra 1961	2009–10	1. HNL	17	0	1	0	—		18	0
Istra 1961	Total		41	7	2	0	—		43	7
Velež Mostar	2010–11	Bosnian Premier League	26	10	—		—		26	10
Velež Mostar	2011–12	Bosnian Premier League	28	4	3	0	—		31	4
Velež Mostar	2012–13	Bosnian Premier League	27	8	—		—		27	8
Velež Mostar	2013–14	Bosnian Premier League	29	10	2	1	—		31	11
Velež Mostar	Total		110	32	5	1	—		115	33
Sarajevo	2014–15	Bosnian Premier League	20	5	4	4	6	2	30	11
Sarajevo	2015–16	Bosnian Premier League	26	5	5	2	0	0	31	7
Sarajevo	Total		46	10	9	6	6	2	62	18
Radnik Bijeljina	2016–17	Bosnian Premier League	18	1	2	0	2	0	22	1
Radnik Bijeljina	2017–18	Bosnian Premier League	21	2	—		—		21	3
Radnik Bijeljina	Total		39	3	2	0	2	0	43	3
Čelik Zenica	2018–19	Bosnian Premier League	32	5	1	0	—		33	5
Čelik Zenica	2019–20	Bosnian Premier League	13	0	0	0	—		13	0
Čelik Zenica	Total		45	5	1	0	—		46	5
Radnik Bijeljina	2019–20	Bosnian Premier League	2	0	—		—		2	0
Career total			308	63	19	7	8	2	335	72

== Honours ==
Istra 1961

- 2. HNL: 2008–09

Sarajevo

- Bosnian Premier League: 2014–15
