= Dalibor Pandža =

Bosnian footballer

Personal information
- Full name: Dalibor Pandža
- Date of birth: 23 March 1991 (age 35)
- Place of birth: Sarajevo, Bosnia and Herzegovina
- Height: 1.80 m (5 ft 11 in)
- Position: Left winger

Team information
- Current team: FV Bad Vilbel
- Number: 9

Youth career
- 2006–2008: Sarajevo

Senior career*
Years	Team	Apps	(Gls)
2008–2009	Sarajevo	12	(3)
2009–2010	Dinamo Zagreb	0	(0)
2009	→ Lokomotiva Zagreb (loan)	11	(0)
2010–2012	Lokomotiva Zagreb	0	(0)
2010	→ Radnik Sesvete (loan)	15	(6)
2012–2014	Zvijezda Gradačac	39	(10)
2014–2016	Olimpik	43	(13)
2016–2017	Ironi Nesher	33	(5)
2017	Santarcangelo	3	(0)
2018	Mladost Doboj Kakanj	14	(2)
2019–2020	Olimpik	23	(7)
2020–	FV Bad Vilbel	6	(2)

International career
2008–2010	Bosnia and Herzegovina U19	6	(1)
- * Club domestic league appearances and goals as of 11:55, 12 October 2020 (UTC)

Dalibor Pandža (born 23 March 1991 in Sarajevo) is a Bosnian professional footballer who plays as a left winger for German club FV Bad Vilbel.

== Club career ==
Dalibor began his career in the youth from FK Sarajevo and was promoted to the Bosnian Premier League team in March 2008. As Pandža is a Bosnian Croat and a great talent, the Croatian Football Federation continued their practice with trying to get these players to play for Croatia rather than Bosnia, and offered Pandža a place in their team. But Pandža declined and stated that he only wanted to play for his country, Bosnia and Herzegovina. This made him very popular among Bosnians even though many had never heard of him or seen him play at the time.

Pandža signed with FK Olimpik in December 2018. In the 2018–19 First League of FBiH season, Pandža scored 7 goals in 14 league games for Olimpik. He left Olimpik in January 2020.

On 23 January 2020 it was confirmed, that Pandža had joined German Hessenliga club FV Bad Vilbel.

== International career ==
Between 2008 and 2010, Pandža made 6 appearances for the Bosnia and Herzegovina U19 national team, making 6 appearances and scoring 1 goal in the process.

== Style of play ==
Pandža can play as both right and a left winger.

== Honours ==
=== Club ===
Olimpik Sarajevo

- Bosnian Cup: 2014–15
