= Samir Merzić =

Bosnia and Herzegovina footballer (born 1984)

Personal information
- Date of birth: 29 June 1984 (age 42)
- Place of birth: Mostar, SFR Yugoslavia
- Height: 1.84 m (6 ft 0 in)
- Position: Defender

Senior career*
Years	Team	Apps	(Gls)
2004–2005	Velež Mostar		
2005–2006	Ústí nad Labem	25	(0)
2006–2010	Teplice	45	(1)
2010–2011	Senica	19	(0)
2011	Amkar Perm	0	(0)
2011–2015	Velež Mostar	74	(5)
2015	IL Stjørdals-Blink		
2015–2016	Velež Mostar	11	(1)
2016–2017	Sloboda Tuzla	20	(0)

International career
2007–2008	Bosnia and Herzegovina	4	(0)
- * Club domestic league appearances and goals

Samir Merzić (born 29 June 1984) is a Bosnian former professional footballer who played as a defender. He has played four times for the Bosnia and Herzegovina national team. He played in the Gambrinus liga for FK Teplice.

== International career ==
Merzić made his debut for Bosnia and Herzegovina in an October 2007 European Championship qualification match away against Greece and has earned a total of four caps. His final international was a January 2008 friendly match against Japan.
