= 2013–14 Bosnia and Herzegovina Football Cup =

Tournament details
- Country: Bosnia and Herzegovina
- Teams: 32

Final positions
- Champions: Sarajevo
- Runners-up: Čelik Zenica

The 2013–14 Bosnia and Herzegovina Football Cup was the nineteenth season of Bosnia and Herzegovina's annual football cup, and a fourteenth season of the unified competition. The winner would have qualified to the second qualifying round of the 2014–15 UEFA Europa League.

== Participating clubs ==
The following 32 teams competed in Round 1: (Team in bold is the winner)

| **2013–14 Premier League of Bosnia and Herzegovina** all clubs | **2013–14 First League of the Federation of Bosnia and Herzegovina** six clubs | **2013–14 First League of the Republika Srpska** six clubs | **4 regional cup winners** |
| Borac; Čelik; Leotar; Mladost (VO); Olimpic; Radnik; Rudar (P); Sarajevo; Slavija; Široki Brijeg; Travnik; Velež; Vitez; Zrinjski; Zvijezda; Željezničar | HNK Branitelj; NK Bratstvo Gračanica; FK Igman Konjic; HNK Orašje; NK Podgrmeč; FK Sloboda Tuzla | FK Drina HE Višegrad; FK Kozara Gradiška; FK Modriča; FK Podrinje Janja; FK Sloboda Mrkonjić Grad; FK Sloga Doboj | HNK Grude (Second League of the Federation of Bosnia and Herzegovina – South); NK Natron (Second League of the Federation of Bosnia and Herzegovina – Center); FK Mladost Župča (Second League of the Federation of Bosnia and Herzegovina – Center); NK Rijeka Vitez (First League of Central Bosnia Canton) |

== First round ==
| Home team | Score | Away team |
17 September
| FK Borac Banja Luka | 3–0 | FK Drina HE Višegrad |
| NK Podgrmeč | 2–7 | FK Sarajevo |
| FK Leotar | 0–2 | FK Olimpic |
| FK Velež Mostar | 8–0 | NK Rijeka Vitez |
| NK Vitez | 2–1 | NK Zvijezda Gradačac |
| FK Mladost Velika Obarska | 0–0 (2–1 p) | FK Podrinje Janja |
| FK Igman Konjic | 0–2 | NK Široki Brijeg |
| NK Natron | 4–2 | FK Mladost Župča |
| FK Sloga Doboj | 0–0 (3–4 p) | HNK Grude |
| FK Slavija | 2–0 | HNK Orašje |
| NK Bratstvo Gračanica | 1–0 | FK Sloboda Tuzla |
| HNK Branitelj | 0–0 (2–4 p) | FK Radnik Bijeljina |
| FK Sloboda Mrkonjić Grad | 4–0 | NK Travnik |
| HŠK Zrinjski Mostar | 1–1 (5–4 p) | FK Rudar Prijedor |
| FK Modriča | 0–1 | NK Čelik Zenica |
| FK Kozara Gradiška | 0–2 | FK Željezničar Sarajevo |

== Second round ==
| Team 1 | Agg. | Team 2 | 1st leg | 2nd leg |
|---|---|---|---|---|
| Vitez (1) | 2–2 (2–4 p) | Sarajevo (1) | 1–1 | 1–1 |
| Zrinjski Mostar (1) | 5–1 | Borac Banja Luka (1) | 4–0 | 1–1 |
| Čelik Zenica (1) | 6–2 | Bratstvo Gračanica (2) | 4–0 | 2–2 |
| Sloboda Mrkonjić Grad (2) | 4–7 | Velež Mostar (1) | 2–3 | 2–4 |
| Natron (3) | 1–5 | Mladost Velika Obarska (1) | 1–1 | 0–4 |
| Olimpic (1) | 3–0 | Grude (3) | 2–0 | 1–0 |
| Široki Brijeg (1) | 5–1 | Radnik Bijeljina (1) | 4–1 | 1–0 |
| Slavija (1) | 0–4 | Željezničar Sarajevo (1) | 0–2 | 0–2 |

=== First legs ===
| 22 October 2013. | Vitez | 1–1 | Sarajevo | Stadion Pirota, Travnik |
| 15:00 | Pranjković 21' (pen.) | | Todorović 61' | Attendance: 600 |

| 22 October 2013 | Zrinjski Mostar | 4–0 | Borac Banja Luka | Bijeli Brijeg Stadium, Mostar |
| 17:00 | Aničić 10', 47'; Đurić 34' (pen.); Graovac 41' |

| 23 October 2013 | Čelik Zenica | 4–0 | Bratstvo Gračanica | Bilino Polje, Zenica |
| 16:00 | Gojković 23'; Bajraktarević 41'; Mešanović 68', 83' |

| 23 October 2013 | Sloboda Mrkonjić Grad | 2–3 | Velež Mostar | Gradski stadion Luke, Mrkonjić Grad |
| 16:00 | Radonja 48', 90' | | Okić 3'; Rašević 61'; Jusufbašić 84' |

| 23 October 2013 | Natron | 1–1 | Mladost Velika Obarska |
| 16:00 |

| 23 October 2013 | Olimpic | 2–0 | Grude | Stadion Otoka, Sarajevo |
| 16:00 | Vidović 40'; Regoje 53' |

| 23 October 2013 | Široki Brijeg | 4–1 | Radnik Bijeljina | Stadion Pecara, Široki Brijeg |
| 16:00 | Wagner 8', 40' (pen.), 41'; Zakarić 35' | | Ristić 30' (pen.) |

| 23 October 2013 | Slavija | 0–2 | Željezničar Sarajevo | Gradski SRC Slavija, Istočno Sarajevo |
| 16:00 | | | Hasanović 39'; Hodžić 90' |

=== Second legs ===
| 6 November 2013 | Grude | 0–1 (0–3 agg.) | Olimpic |
| 13:30 | | | Rahmanović 33' |

| 6 November 2013 | Bratstvo Gračanica | 2–2 (2–6 agg.) | Čelik Zenica | Stadion Luke, Gračanica |
| 13:30 | Diabang 49' | | Mešanović 37' |

| 6 November 2013 | Mladost Velika Obarska | 4–0 (5–1 agg.) | Natron | Gradski stadion, Bijeljina |
| 13:30 | Komarčević 5', 12', 29' |

| 6 November 2013 | Radnik Bijeljina | 0–1 (1–5 agg.) | Široki Brijeg | Gradski stadion, Bijeljina |
| 13:30 |

| 6 November 2013. | Sarajevo | 1–1 (2–2 agg.) (4–2 p) | Vitez | Asim Ferhatović Hase Stadium, Sarajevo |
| 13:30 | Komazec 38' | | Šišić 70' | Attendance: 200; Referee: Elvis Mujić |
| | Penalties |
| | Trivunović (penalty scored); Todorović (penalty scored); Tadejević (penalty missed); Travančić (penalty missed); Puzigaća (penalty scored) | | Mišić (penalty missed); Brekalo (penalty scored); Kapetan (penalty missed); Branković (penalty missed) |

| 6 November 2013 | Velež Mostar | 4–2 (7–4 agg.) | Sloboda Mrkonjić Grad | Vrapčići Stadium, Mostar |
| 13:30 | Ramović 8', 14'; Ćemalović 27'; Merzić 90+4' | | Malbašić 33'; Radoja 86' |

| 6 November 2013 | Borac Banja Luka | 1–1 (1–5 agg.) | Zrinjski Mostar | Banja Luka City Stadium, Banja Luka |
| 17:30 | Runić 74' | | Muminović 31' |

| 6 November 2013 | Željezničar Sarajevo | 2–0 (4–0 agg.) | Slavija | Stadion Grbavica, Grbavica |
| 18:00 | Bajić 38', 61' |

== Quarter-finals ==
=== First leg ===
| 12 March 2014 | Čelik Zenica (1) | 0–0 | Velež Mostar (1) | Bilino Polje, Zenica |
| 13:00 CET | | Summary |

| 12 March 2014 | Mladost Velika Obarska (1) | 0–1 | Zrinjski Mostar (1) | Gradski stadion, Bijeljina |
| 13:00 CET | | Summary | Šćepanović 75' |

| 12 March 2014 | Široki Brijeg (1) | 2–0 | Olimpic (1) | Stadion Pecara, Široki Brijeg |
| 13:00 CET | M. Marić 73', 85' | Summary |

| 12 March 2014 | Željezničar Sarajevo (1) | 1–1 | Sarajevo (1) | Stadion Grbavica, Grbavica |
| 18:00 CET | Svraka 14' | Summary | Jajalo 48' | Attendance: 7.500 |

=== Second leg ===
| 26 March 2014 | Olimpic (1) | 3–2 (3–4 agg.) | Široki Brijeg (1) | Stadion Otoka, Sarajevo |
| 14:30 CET | Smajić 14'; Pandža 45'; Zec 76' | [ Summary] | Zadro 7'; Wagner 73' |

| 26 March 2014 | Velež Mostar (1) | 1–1 (1–1(a) agg.) | Čelik Zenica (1) | Vrapčići Stadium, Mostar |
| 15:30 CET | Okić 34' | [ Summary] | Bajraktarević 59' |

| 26 March 2014 | Zrinjski Mostar (1) | 5–1 (6–1 agg.) | Mladost Velika Obarska (1) | Bijeli Brijeg Stadium, Mostar |
| 15:30 CET | Barišić 22'; Crnov 32', 84'; Šćepanović 66'; Basara 70' | [ Summary] | Vasić 7' |

| 26 March 2014 | Sarajevo (1) | 0–0 (1(a)–1 agg.) | Željezničar Sarajevo (1) | Asim Ferhatović Hase Stadium, Sarajevo Canton |
| 17:00 CET | | | | Attendance: 13.000 |

== Semi-finals ==
=== First leg ===
| 2 April 2014 | Sarajevo (1) | 0–0 | Zrinjski Mostar (1) | Asim Ferhatović Hase Stadium, Sarajevo |
| 18:30 CEST | | | | Attendance: 4.500 |

| 2 April 2014 | Čelik Zenica (1) | 2–0 | Široki Brijeg (1) | Bilino Polje, Zenica |
| 19:00 CEST | Barać 27'; Mešanović 32' |

=== Second leg ===
| 15 April 2014 | Zrinjski Mostar | 1–3 (1–3 agg.) | Sarajevo | Bijeli Brijeg Stadium, Mostar |
| 18:00 CEST | Bekić 82' | | Stojčev 15'; Bilbija 80'; Velkoski 90' | Attendance: 3.500 |

| 15 April 2014 | Široki Brijeg | 1–0 (1–2 agg.) | Čelik Zenica | Stadion Pecara, Široki Brijeg |
| TBA CEST | Lago 68' | [ Summary] |

== Final ==
=== First leg ===
| 7 May 2014 | Čelik Zenica (1) | 0–2 | Sarajevo (1) | Bilino Polje, Zenica |
| 17:00 Central European Summer Time | | Klix | Trivunović 43'; Stojčev 90+4' | Attendance: 9.000; Referee: Ognjen Valjić |

=== Second leg ===
| 23 May 2014 | Sarajevo | 3–1 (5–1 agg.) | Čelik Zenica | Asim Ferhatović Hase Stadium, Sarajevo |
| 17:00 CEST | Velkoski 67'; Puzigaća 70'; Bilbija 82' | Klix | | Attendance: 9.000; Referee: Edin Jakupović |
