= 2014–15 Premier League of Bosnia and Herzegovina =

Premijer liga
- Season: 2014–15
- Champions: Sarajevo; 2nd Premier League title 3rd Bosnian title 5th Domestic title
- Relegated: Mladost Velika Obarska; Zvijezda
- Champions League: Sarajevo
- Europa League: Željezničar; Zrinjski; Olimpic
- Matches: 240
- Goals: 536 (2.23 per match)
- Top goalscorer: Riad Bajić (15 goals)
- Biggest home win: Široki Brijeg 7–2 Čelik (19 October 2014); Slavija 5–0 Radnik (25 October 2014); Slavija 6–1 Drina Zvornik (22 November 2014)
- Biggest away win: Vitez 0–5 Slavija (23 August 2014)
- Highest scoring: Široki Brijeg 7–2 Čelik (19 October 2014)
- Longest winning run: 5 games Željezničar
- Longest unbeaten run: 9 games Široki Brijeg
- Longest winless run: 12 games Mladost Velika Obarska; Zvijezda
- Longest losing run: 4 games Čelik; Mladost Velika Obarska; Radnik; Vitez
- Highest attendance: 26,000 (FK Sarajevo vs. FK Željezničar)

The 2014–15 Premier League of Bosnia and Herzegovina (known as BH Telecom Premier League for sponsorship reasons) was the fifteenth season of the Premier League of Bosnia and Herzegovina, the highest football league of Bosnia and Herzegovina, since its original establishment in 2000 and twelfth as a unified country-wide league. It began on 2 August 2014 and ended on 23 May 2015, with a winter break between late November 2014 and late February 2015.

The 2014–15 season saw the return of Sloboda Tuzla and Drina Zvornik to zhe top flight as promoted, instead of Rudar Prijedor and Leotar.

== Teams ==
A total of 16 teams contested in the league, including 14 sides from the 2013–14 season and two promoted from each of the second-level leagues.

=== Stadiums and locations ===
Location of the 2014–15 Premier League of Bosnia and Herzegovina clubs

Team	Location	Stadium	Capacity
Borac	Banja Luka	Gradski Stadion, Banja Luka	13,730
Čelik	Zenica	Bilino Polje	15,292
Drina	Zvornik	Gradski Stadion, Zvornik	5,000
Mladost	Velika Obarska	Gradski Stadion, Velika Obarska	1,000
Olimpic	Sarajevo	Otoka	3,000
Radnik	Bijeljina	Gradski Stadion, Bijeljina	6,000
Sarajevo	Sarajevo	Asim Ferhatović Hase	35,630
Slavija	Istočno Sarajevo	SRC Slavija	6,000
Sloboda	Tuzla	Tušanj	8,550
Široki Brijeg	Široki Brijeg	Pecara	5,628
Travnik	Travnik	Pirota	3,200
Velež	Mostar	Vrapčići	5,294
Vitez	Vitez	Gradski Stadion, Vitez	3,000
Zrinjski	Mostar	Bijeli Brijeg	20,000
Zvijezda	Gradačac	Banja Ilidža	5,000
Željezničar	Sarajevo	Grbavica	16,100

=== Personnel and kits ===
Note: Flags indicate national team as has been defined under FIFA eligibility rules. Players and Managers may hold more than one non-FIFA nationality.

Personnel and kits
Team	Head coach	Captain	Kit manufacturer	shirt sponsor
FK Borac Banja Luka	(Bosnia and Herzegovina) Vlado Jagodić	(Bosnia and Herzegovina) Vladan Grujić	NAAI	M:TEL
NK Čelik Zenica	(Croatia) Boris Pavić	(Bosnia and Herzegovina) Adi Adilović	Joma	RM-LH
FK Drina Zvornik	(Serbia) Srđan Bajić	-	Bull	Vitinka
FK Mladost Velika Obarska	(Montenegro) Slavoljub Bubanja	(Serbia) Nemanja Dabić	Bull	—
FK Olimpic	(Bosnia and Herzegovina) Mirza Varešanović	(Bosnia and Herzegovina) Bojan Regoje	Givova	Europlakat
FK Radnik Bijeljina	(Serbia) Slavko Petrović	-	Bull	-
FK Sarajevo	(Bosnia and Herzegovina) Dženan Uščuplić	(Serbia) Ivan Tatomirović	Haad	Turkish Airlines
FK Slavija Sarajevo	(Bosnia and Herzegovina) Dragan Radović	-	Joma	Nova Banka
FK Sloboda Tuzla	(Bosnia and Herzegovina) Husref Musemić	(Bosnia and Herzegovina) Muhamed Omić	Patrick	Tuzlanski pilsner
NK Široki Brijeg	(Bosnia and Herzegovina) Slaven Musa	(Brazil) Wagner	Jako	Mepas
NK Travnik	(Bosnia and Herzegovina) Husnija Arapović	(Bosnia and Herzegovina) Feđa Dudić	NAAI	ADK
FK Velež Mostar	(Bosnia and Herzegovina) Nedim Jusufbegović	(Bosnia and Herzegovina) Samir Merzić	Haad	HEPOK Mostar
NK Vitez	(Croatia) Ante Miše	(Bosnia and Herzegovina) Mladen Jurčević	Joma	-
HŠK Zrinjski Mostar	(Bosnia and Herzegovina) Vinko Marinović	(Bosnia and Herzegovina) Pero Stojkić	Zeus	Interagent
NK Zvijezda Gradačac	(Germany) Petar Segrt		Bull	-
FK Željezničar Sarajevo	(Bosnia and Herzegovina) Milomir Odović	(Bosnia and Herzegovina) Srđan Stanić	Joma	—

=== Managerial changes ===
Team	Outgoing manager	Manner of departure	Date of vacancy	Position in table	Replaced by	Date of appointment
Željezničar	(Bosnia and Herzegovina) Hajrudin Đurbuzović	Sacked	29 May 2014	Preseason	(Bosnia and Herzegovina) Admir Adžem	6 June 2014
Sloboda Tuzla	(Croatia) Miroslav Blažević	Resigned	3 June 2014	Preseason	(Bosnia and Herzegovina) Denis Sadiković	23 June 2014
Vitez	(Croatia) Ante Miše	Resigned	17 June 2014	Preseason	(Bosnia and Herzegovina) Husnija Arapović	18 June 2014
Vitez	(Bosnia and Herzegovina) Husnija Arapović	Resigned	25 August 2014	16th	(Croatia) Ante Miše	3 September 2014
Travnik	(Bosnia and Herzegovina) Osman Bajrić	Resigned	29 August 2014	12th		
Zvijezda	(Bosnia and Herzegovina) Nermin Huseinbašić	Resigned	30 August 2014	15th	(Germany) Petar Segrt	2 September 2014
Radnik	(Bosnia and Herzegovina) Srđan Bajić	Sacked	3 September 2014	15th	(Serbia) Slavko Petrović	5 September 2014

== League table ==
Pos	Team	Pld	W	D	L	GF	GA	GD	Pts	Qualification or relegation
1	Sarajevo (C)	30	19	9	2	55	17	+38	66	Qualification to Champions League second qualifying round
2	Željezničar	30	18	9	3	52	22	+30	63	Qualification to Europa League first qualifying round
3	Zrinjski	30	16	11	3	41	13	+28	59	Qualification to Europa League first qualifying round
4	Široki Brijeg	30	15	11	4	46	23	+23	56	
5	Borac Banja Luka	30	14	7	9	26	26	0	49	
6	Olimpic	30	13	7	10	39	34	+5	46	Qualification to Europa League first qualifying round (Note: Olimpic qualified for Europa League first qualifying round by winning the 2014–15 Bosnia and Herzegovina Football Cup.)
7	Čelik	30	10	11	9	34	35	−1	41	
8	Sloboda Tuzla	30	11	7	12	33	28	+5	40	
9	Velež	30	10	8	12	32	33	−1	38	
10	Radnik	30	7	10	13	29	37	−8	31	
11	Travnik	30	8	7	15	22	42	−20	31	
12	Slavija	30	7	7	16	30	44	−14	28	
13	Drina Zvornik	30	6	9	15	26	40	−14	27	
14	Vitez	30	7	5	18	21	43	−22	26	
15	Mladost Velika Obarska (R)	30	6	8	16	18	44	−26	26	Relegation to Prva Liga RS
16	Zvijezda (R)	30	5	10	15	30	53	−23	25	Relegation to Prva Liga FBiH

Source: uefa.com
Rules for classification: 1) points; 2) goal difference; 3) number of goals scored
(C) Champions; (R) Relegated

== Results ==
Home \ Away	BOR	ČEL	DRZ	MVO	OLI	RAD	SAR	SLA	SLO	ŠB	TRA	VEL	VIT	ZRI	ZVI	ŽEL
Borac Banja Luka		1–0	2–1	2–0	0–1	1–1	1–3	2–0	1–0	1–1	1–0	2–1	2–1	1–0	1–0	1–0
Čelik	1–1		0–1	1–0	0–1	2–1	1–1	3–2	2–2	5–3	1–0	1–1	0–0	0–0	1–1	1–1
Drina Zvornik	0–0	0–1		0–2	3–0	1–0	0–0	0–0	0–0	1–1	3–0	3–1	0–0	1–2	1–1	1–2
Mladost Velika Obarska	2–0	1–2	0–2		0–0	1–1	1–1	2–1	1–0	0–2	2–1	0–0	1–0	0–2	1–1	0–3
Olimpic	4–1	1–2	5–2	3–0		0–3	0–1	1–0	1–0	0–0	3–0	1–0	2–0	0–1	3–0	0–3
Radnik	0–1	2–2	1–0	3–1	2–2		0–2	0–0	2–0	1–2	1–1	1–0	2–0	0–0	0–1	1–3
Sarajevo	0–0	1–1	2–0	4–0	4–2	5–0		3–0	3–1	1–0	2–2	1–1	1–0	1–0	3–0	0–0
Slavija	0–1	0–1	6–1	0–0	1–3	0–4	2–3		2–1	1–1	1–0	1–1	1–0	0–0	2–1	1–1
Sloboda Tuzla	2–0	1–0	2–0	3–2	2–1	1–1	0–2	4–0		0–1	4–0	1–1	1–0	1–0	0–0	1–2
Široki Brijeg	0–0	7–2	3–1	2–0	1–1	2–0	1–0	2–0	1–0		2–0	2–0	2–1	1–1	4–2	0–0
Travnik	1–2	1–0	2–2	1–0	0–0	1–0	0–2	2–0	0–3	2–1		2–1	2–0	1–3	2–0	0–0
Velež	1–0	1–0	1–0	0–0	1–1	3–0	2–0	2–0	0–1	1–0	2–1		4–0	1–1	3–2	0–3
Vitez	1–1	1–0	1–0	2–0	0–1	1–0	0–3	0–5	3–1	1–3	0–0	3–1		0–1	3–0	1–4
Zrinjski	2–0	1–1	1–1	0–0	2–0	2–0	1–1	2–0	1–0	0–0	5–0	2–0	2–0		3–0	1–1
Zvijezda	2–0	0–2	2–1	3–1	2–2	1–1	0–3	1–3	0–0	0–0	0–0	3–2	1–1	2–3		1–2
Željezničar	1–0	2–1	2–0	4–0	3–0	1–1	1–2	2–1	1–1	1–1	1–0	1–0	2–1	0–2	5–3	

Source: SportSport.ba
Legend: Blue = home team win; Yellow = draw; Red = away team win.

== Top goalscorers ==
As of 31 May 2015

Rank	Player	Club	Goals
1	(Bosnia and Herzegovina) Riad Bajić	Željezničar	15
2	(Bosnia and Herzegovina) Stevo Nikolić	Zrinjski	14
3	(Brazil) Wagner	Široki Brijeg	13
4	(North Macedonia) Krste Velkoski	Sarajevo	11
5	(Bosnia and Herzegovina) Jovica Stokić	Borac	10
6	(Croatia) Leon Benko	Sarajevo	9
6	(Serbia) Miloš Filipović	Drina Zvornik	9
6	(Bosnia and Herzegovina) Bojan Puzigaća	Sarajevo	9
6	(Serbia) Uroš Stojanov	Zvijezda	9
10	(Bosnia and Herzegovina) Zoran Kokot	Slavija	8
10	(Croatia) Ivan Crnov	Zrinjski	8
10	(Bosnia and Herzegovina) Dalibor Pandža	Olimpic	8
10	(Senegal) Secouba Diatta	Zvijezda	8

== Attendances ==
#	Club	Average
1	Sarajevo	6,757
2	Željezničar	3,447
3	Zrinjski	2,293
4	Sloboda	2,253
5	Borac	1,417
6	Široki	1,193
7	Vitez	1,080
8	Čelik	1,073
9	Velež	890
10	Zvijezda	873
11	Travnik	790
12	Drina	757
13	Olimpik	575
14	Mladost	507
15	Radnik	467
16	Slavija	250
