= List of Bosnia and Herzegovina football transfers winter 2013–14 =

This is a list of transfers in Bosnian football for the 2013–14 winter transfer window. Only moves featuring a Premier League of Bosnia and Herzegovina, First League of the Republika Srpska and First League of the Federation of Bosnia and Herzegovina side are listed.

== Premier League of Bosnia and Herzegovina ==
=== Željezničar ===
In: Note: Flags indicate national team as defined under FIFA eligibility rules; some limited exceptions apply. Players may hold more than one non-FIFA nationality.

No.	Pos.	Nation	Player
—	FW	BIH	Mirsad Ramić (loan return from Travnik)
—	DF	BIH	Kerim Memija (from youth team)
—	DF	BIH	Amir Spahić (free)
—	DF	BIH	Jasmin Bogdanović (from Zvijezda Gradačac)

Out: Note: Flags indicate national team as defined under FIFA eligibility rules; some limited exceptions apply. Players may hold more than one non-FIFA nationality.

No.	Pos.	Nation	Player
85	DF	MKD	Yani Urdinov (released)
1	GK	BIH	Adnan Hadžić (released)
6	DF	BIH	Asim Škaljić (to Velež)

=== Sarajevo ===
In: Note: Flags indicate national team as defined under FIFA eligibility rules; some limited exceptions apply. Players may hold more than one non-FIFA nationality.

No.	Pos.	Nation	Player
7	FW	SRB	Miloš Stojčev (free, last with (Kazakhstan) Atyrau)
5	DF	BIH	Mario Barić (free, last with (Serbia) Vojvodina)
18	MF	BIH	Dario Purić (from (Serbia) Sloboda Užice)
11	FW	MKD	Krste Velkoski (from (North Macedonia) Rabotnički)
30	GK	CRO	Matej Delač (on loan from (England) Chelsea)
74	DF	BIH	Andria Petrović (from NK Sloga Ljubuški)
8	MF	CRO	Mato Jajalo (on loan from (Germany) 1. FC Köln)
70	MF	CIV	Germain Kouadio (from (Ivory Coast) Moossou FC)

Out: Note: Flags indicate national team as defined under FIFA eligibility rules; some limited exceptions apply. Players may hold more than one non-FIFA nationality.

No.	Pos.	Nation	Player
15	FW	BIH	Alem Plakalo (on loan to Sloboda Tuzla)
7	FW	BIH	Ermin Huseinbašić (on loan to Sloboda Tuzla)
11	FW	SRB	Nikola Komazec (to (South Korea) Busan IPark)
5	MF	BIH	Adnan Hrelja (on loan to Rudar Kakanj)
23	FW	BIH	Mahir Karić (to Travnik)
8	MF	BIH	Dino Bišanović (free)
30	GK	BIH	Almin Abdihodžić (on loan to NK Podgrmeč)
33	DF	BIH	Alija Čulov (on loan to NK Podgrmeč)
10	MF	BIH	Dušan Jevtić

=== Široki Brijeg ===
In: Note: Flags indicate national team as defined under FIFA eligibility rules; some limited exceptions apply. Players may hold more than one non-FIFA nationality.

No.	Pos.	Nation	Player
—	MF	BRA	Hugo Alexandrino Sousa (from (Brazil) Bahia de Feira)
—	DF	BIH	Josip Ćorluka (from youth team)
—	MF	BIH	Ante Petrović (from youth team)
—	MF	CRO	Mate Pehar (from (Croatia) Split)

Out: Note: Flags indicate national team as defined under FIFA eligibility rules; some limited exceptions apply. Players may hold more than one non-FIFA nationality.

No.	Pos.	Nation	Player
8	DF	CRO	Vedran Ješe (released)
—	MF	BIH	Zvonimir Kožulj (on loan to Branitelj Mostar, was on loan at Vitez)

=== Zrinjski Mostar ===
In: Note: Flags indicate national team as defined under FIFA eligibility rules; some limited exceptions apply. Players may hold more than one non-FIFA nationality.

No.	Pos.	Nation	Player
—	MF	CRO	Danijel Stojanović (free)
—	MF	BIH	Ivan Mamić (from Slavija)
—	FW	BIH	Stevo Nikolić (free)
—	DF	SRB	Radoslav Aleksić (from Slavija)
—	MF	SRB	Marko Basara (free)

Out: Note: Flags indicate national team as defined under FIFA eligibility rules; some limited exceptions apply. Players may hold more than one non-FIFA nationality.

No.	Pos.	Nation	Player
15	MF	CRO	Hrvoje Miličević (to (Italy) Pescara Calcio)
20	MF	BIH	Vedran Kantar (to Rudar Prijedor)

=== Borac Banja Luka ===
In: Note: Flags indicate national team as defined under FIFA eligibility rules; some limited exceptions apply. Players may hold more than one non-FIFA nationality.

No.	Pos.	Nation	Player
15	DF	BIH	Darko Đajić (from Leotar)
—	MF	BIH	Boban Đerić (from Leotar)
19	MF	BIH	Stefan Savić (from youth team)
—	MF	BIH	Nebojša Kodžoman (from Laktaši)
9	FW	BIH	Petar Kunić (on loan from (Czech Republic) Dukla Prague)
5	DF	SRB	Marko Jevtić (free, last with Radnik Bijeljina)
86	DF	SRB	Miloš Marković (from (Serbia) Novi Pazar)
25	GK	BIH	Stefan Tomović (free, last with Slavija)
33	DF	SRB	Ivan Dragićević (from (Iceland) KA Akureyri)
99	FW	BIH	Haris Handžić (from (Liechtenstein) Vaduz)

Out: Note: Flags indicate national team as defined under FIFA eligibility rules; some limited exceptions apply. Players may hold more than one non-FIFA nationality.

No.	Pos.	Nation	Player
15	DF	BIH	Boris Raspudić (to Brunei DPMM)
14	FW	BIH	Jovica Stokić (to (South Korea) Jeju United)
19	DF	BIH	Ognjen Petrović (loan return to (Serbia) Javor Ivanjica)
25	GK	BIH	Dragan Đorđić (released)
21	MF	BIH	Milan Sapardić (released)
—	GK	BIH	Mladen Lučić (to Slavija, was on loan at Radnik Bijeljina)
17	MF	BIH	Ognjen Đelmić (to (Kazakhstan) Spartak Semey)

=== Olimpic ===
In: Note: Flags indicate national team as defined under FIFA eligibility rules; some limited exceptions apply. Players may hold more than one non-FIFA nationality.

No.	Pos.	Nation	Player
—	DF	BIH	Jadranko Bogičević (free)
—	MF	BIH	Safet Šivšić (free)
—	MF	BIH	Enes Sačević (free)
—	DF	BIH	Almir Čubura (free)
—	MF	BIH	Kenan Handžić (from (Croatia) Zagreb)
—	MF	BIH	Amer Gojak (from Željezničar youth team)

Out: Note: Flags indicate national team as defined under FIFA eligibility rules; some limited exceptions apply. Players may hold more than one non-FIFA nationality.

No.	Pos.	Nation	Player
28	MF	SRB	Miloš Vidović (released)

=== Velež ===
In: Note: Flags indicate national team as defined under FIFA eligibility rules; some limited exceptions apply. Players may hold more than one non-FIFA nationality.

No.	Pos.	Nation	Player
—	MF	SRB	Dejan Janković (free, last with (Serbia) Voždovac)
—	DF	BIH	Asim Škaljić (from Željezničar)
—	MF	SRB	Jovan Blagojević (from (Serbia) Sinđelić Beograd)

Out: Note: Flags indicate national team as defined under FIFA eligibility rules; some limited exceptions apply. Players may hold more than one non-FIFA nationality.

No.	Pos.	Nation	Player
6	MF	BIH	Danijel Majkić (released)
18	FW	BIH	Sabahudin Jusufbašić (to Sloboda Tuzla)

=== Čelik ===
In: Note: Flags indicate national team as defined under FIFA eligibility rules; some limited exceptions apply. Players may hold more than one non-FIFA nationality.

No.	Pos.	Nation	Player
—	MF	CRO	Petar Bašić (from (Lithuania) Sūduva Marijampolė)
—	MF	BIH	Fenan Salčinović (free)

Out: Note: Flags indicate national team as defined under FIFA eligibility rules; some limited exceptions apply. Players may hold more than one non-FIFA nationality.

No.	Pos.	Nation	Player
27	FW	BIH	Duško Stajić (released)
21	MF	SRB	Marko Nestorović (released)
11	FW	BIH	Saša Kajkut (released)
6	DF	BIH	Kenan Horić (to (Slovenia) Domžale)
1	GK	BIH	Adis Nurković (to Travnik)

=== Zvijezda Gradačac ===
In: Note: Flags indicate national team as defined under FIFA eligibility rules; some limited exceptions apply. Players may hold more than one non-FIFA nationality.

No.	Pos.	Nation	Player
—	MF	BIH	Edis Zulić (from Sloga Tojšići)
—	FW	BIH	Belmin Vila (from (Montenegro) Mladost Podgorica)

Out: Note: Flags indicate national team as defined under FIFA eligibility rules; some limited exceptions apply. Players may hold more than one non-FIFA nationality.

No.	Pos.	Nation	Player
28	DF	BIH	Elmir Kuduzović (released)
13	MF	BIH	Almir Šmigalović (released)
22	DF	BIH	Jasmin Bogdanović (to Željezničar)

=== Radnik Bijeljina ===
In: Note: Flags indicate national team as defined under FIFA eligibility rules; some limited exceptions apply. Players may hold more than one non-FIFA nationality.

No.	Pos.	Nation	Player
—	MF	BIH	Nikola Mojović (from (Montenegro) Zeta)

Out: Note: Flags indicate national team as defined under FIFA eligibility rules; some limited exceptions apply. Players may hold more than one non-FIFA nationality.

No.	Pos.	Nation	Player
10	MF	BIH	Ognjen Radulović (released)
13	MF	BIH	Mario Desnica (released)
3	MF	BIH	Vladanko Komlenović (released)
1	GK	BIH	Mladen Lučić (loan return to Borac Banja Luka)
4	DF	SRB	Marko Jevtić (to Borac Banja Luka)
14	FW	BIH	Dragan Ristić (released)

=== Vitez ===
In: Note: Flags indicate national team as defined under FIFA eligibility rules; some limited exceptions apply. Players may hold more than one non-FIFA nationality.

No.	Pos.	Nation	Player
—	MF	BIH	Haris Hećo (free, last with Travnik)
—	FW	BIH	Aladin Isaković (free, last with Travnik)

Out: Note: Flags indicate national team as defined under FIFA eligibility rules; some limited exceptions apply. Players may hold more than one non-FIFA nationality.

No.	Pos.	Nation	Player
22	DF	BIH	Darijo Pranjković (released)
3	DF	BIH	Sanel Alić (released)
2	MF	BIH	Dragan Šantić (released)
—	MF	BIH	Borislav Grbavac (released)
20	MF	BIH	Zvonimir Kožulj (loan return to Široki Brijeg)

=== Slavija ===
In: Note: Flags indicate national team as defined under FIFA eligibility rules; some limited exceptions apply. Players may hold more than one non-FIFA nationality.

No.	Pos.	Nation	Player
—	MF	JPN	Soma Otani (from (Montenegro) Berane)
—	FW	SRB	Bojan Zoranović (from (Serbia) Metalac GM)
—	GK	BIH	Mladen Lučić (from Borac Banja Luka)
—	MF	BIH	Nemanja Prodanović (from (Croatia) Slavonac)
—	FW	MNE	Igor Lambulić (free, last with (Serbia) Čukarički)

Out: Note: Flags indicate national team as defined under FIFA eligibility rules; some limited exceptions apply. Players may hold more than one non-FIFA nationality.

No.	Pos.	Nation	Player
18	FW	BIH	Feđa Dudić (to Travnik)
21	MF	BIH	Ivan Mamić (to Zrinjski)
16	MF	BIH	Marko Perišić (to (Poland) Korona Kielce)
23	GK	BIH	Stefan Tomović (to Borac Banja Luka)
26	DF	SRB	Radoslav Aleksić (to Zrinjski)
15	DF	BIH	Miloš Urta (released)

=== Mladost Velika Obarska ===
In: Note: Flags indicate national team as defined under FIFA eligibility rules; some limited exceptions apply. Players may hold more than one non-FIFA nationality.

No.	Pos.	Nation	Player
—	MF	BIH	Srđan Savić (free)
—	DF	BIH	Delimir Bajić (free, last with (Serbia) Sloboda Užice)
—	MF	BIH	Lazar Zečević (from Leotar)
—	DF	BIH	Vukašin Benović (free, last with Slavija)
—	MF	BIH	Žikica Božić (from Rudar Ugljevik)

Out: Note: Flags indicate national team as defined under FIFA eligibility rules; some limited exceptions apply. Players may hold more than one non-FIFA nationality.

No.	Pos.	Nation	Player
3	DF	BIH	Vlado Marković (released)

=== Rudar Prijedor ===
In: Note: Flags indicate national team as defined under FIFA eligibility rules; some limited exceptions apply. Players may hold more than one non-FIFA nationality.

No.	Pos.	Nation	Player
—	MF	BIH	Vedran Kantar (from Zrinjski Mostar)
—	MF	MNE	Jasmin Muhović (from (Montenegro) OFK Petrovac)
—	MF	MNE	Marko Raičević (from (North Macedonia) Napredok Kičevo)
—	MF	SRB	Lazar Vulić (from (Serbia) Sloga Kraljevo)
—	DF	SRB	Mihajlo Anđić (from (Serbia) Sinđelić Niš)
—	MF	SRB	Uglješa Radinović (from (Serbia) Rad Beograd)
—	GK	CRO	Mateo Radovanović (from (Croatia) Zagreb)
—	DF	CRO	Stipe Miloš (from (Hungary) Szigetszentmiklósi)
—	FW	BIH	Jasmin Čampara (from (Sweden) Enskede IK)

Out: Note: Flags indicate national team as defined under FIFA eligibility rules; some limited exceptions apply. Players may hold more than one non-FIFA nationality.

No.	Pos.	Nation	Player
—	DF	BIH	Branko Iličić (End of career)

=== Travnik ===
In: Note: Flags indicate national team as defined under FIFA eligibility rules; some limited exceptions apply. Players may hold more than one non-FIFA nationality.

No.	Pos.	Nation	Player
—	FW	BIH	Feđa Dudić (from Slavija)
—	DF	BIH	Armin Helvida (from Novi Travnik)
—	MF	BIH	Haris Fazlagić (from (Canada) Waterloo Region)
—	DF	BIH	Elvis Sadiković (from Radnik Hadžići)
—	GK	BIH	Adis Nurković (from Čelik Zenica)
—	FW	BIH	Mahir Karić (from Sarajevo)
—	MF	CRO	Vladimir Zelenbaba (from (Canada) Waterloo Region)
—	MF	BIH	Adis Hasečić (from (Canada) Waterloo Region)
—	MF	BIH	Edvin Hamzić (from Sloboda Novi Grad)
—	MF	BRA	Adriano Guerra Strack (free)

Out: Note: Flags indicate national team as defined under FIFA eligibility rules; some limited exceptions apply. Players may hold more than one non-FIFA nationality.

No.	Pos.	Nation	Player
8	FW	BIH	Aladin Isaković (released)
9	FW	BIH	Mirsad Ramić (loan return to Željezničar)
21	MF	BIH	Haris Hećo (released)
22	MF	BIH	Almir Pliska (to (Albania) Partizani)

=== Leotar ===
In: Note: Flags indicate national team as defined under FIFA eligibility rules; some limited exceptions apply. Players may hold more than one non-FIFA nationality.

No.	Pos.	Nation	Player
—	DF	SRB	Nikola Vasiljević (free, last with (Serbia) Voždovac)
—	GK	SRB	Goran Čokorilo (from (Serbia) Tabane Trgovački)
—	DF	MNE	Miloš Marković (from (Montenegro) Igalo)
—	DF	SRB	Stefan Petrović (from (Serbia) Šumadija Kragujevac)
—	MF	KOR	Moon Tae-Young (from Modriča)
—	MF	SRB	Vladan Binić (from (Serbia) Radnički 1923)

Out: Note: Flags indicate national team as defined under FIFA eligibility rules; some limited exceptions apply. Players may hold more than one non-FIFA nationality.

No.	Pos.	Nation	Player
13	MF	BIH	Boban Đerić (to Borac Banja Luka)
4	MF	BIH	Srđan Andrić (released)
16	DF	BIH	Darko Đajić (to Borac Banja Luka)
7	MF	BIH	Lazar Zečević (to Mladost Velika Obarska)
91	GK	BIH	Mladen Kukrika (to (Albania) Kastrioti)
11	DF	CRO	Denis Bajalica (released)
5	DF	BIH	Dejan Popović (to (Serbia) Inđija)
22	MF	SRB	Ivan Marinković (to (Serbia) Sloga Kraljevo)

== See also ==
- Premier League of Bosnia and Herzegovina
- First League of the Republika Srpska
- First League of the Federation of Bosnia and Herzegovina
- 2013–14 Premier League of Bosnia and Herzegovina
- 2013–14 First League of the Republika Srpska
- 2013–14 First League of the Federation of Bosnia and Herzegovina
