= 2013–14 FK Sarajevo season =

Sarajevo
2013–14 season
- Sporting director: Abdulah Ibraković
- Chairman: Alen Hujić; Edis Kusturica
- Manager: Husref Musemić; Abdulah Oruč; Robert Jarni; Dženan Uščuplić
- Stadium: Asim Ferhatović Hase Stadium
- Premier League BiH: 3rd
- Cup of BiH: Winners
- UEFA Europa League: Second qualifying round
- Top goalscorer: League: Nikola Komazec (10); All: Nikola Komazec (14)
- Highest home attendance: 14,000 vs Kukësi (25 July 2013)
- Lowest home attendance: 200 vs Vitez (6 November 2013)
- Average home league attendance: 4,238
- Biggest win: Podgrmeč 2–7 Sarajevo (17 September 2013)
- Biggest defeat: Široki Brijeg 2–0 Sarajevo (24 November 2013)

The 2013–14 Sarajevo season was the club's 65th season in history, and their 20th consecutive season in the top flight of Bosnian football, the Premier League of BiH. Besides competing in the Premier League, the team competed in the National Cup and the qualifications for UEFA Europa League.

== Squad information ==
=== First-team squad ===
Note: Flags indicate national team as defined under FIFA eligibility rules; some limited exceptions apply. Players may hold more than one non-FIFA nationality.

No.	Pos.	Nation	Player
1	GK	BIH	Emir Plakalo
4	DF	BIH	Haris Muharemović
4	DF	MNE	Marko Radulović
5	DF	CRO	Mario Barić
5	MF	BIH	Adnan Hrelja
6	DF	BIH	Adnan Kovačević
7	FW	BIH	Ermin Huseinbašić
7	MF	SRB	Miloš Stojčev
8	MF	CRO	Mato Jajalo (on loan from (Germany) 1. FC Köln)
8	MF	BIH	Dino Bišanović
9	MF	BIH	Anid Travančić
9	FW	SRB	Alen Melunović
10	MF	BIH	Dušan Jevtić
11	FW	MKD	Krste Velkoski
11	FW	SRB	Nikola Komazec
13	MF	BIH	Ognjen Todorović
14	DF	SRB	Ivan Tatomirović
15	FW	BIH	Alem Plakalo
16	MF	SRB	Radan Šunjevarić
17	MF	BIH	Muhamed Džakmić (C)

No.	Pos.	Nation	Player
17	MF	BIH	Amer Osmanagić
18	MF	BIH	Dario Purić
19	GK	BIH	Dejan Bandović
20	DF	BIH	Vule Trivunović (captain)
21	MF	SRB	Irfan Vusljanin
23	FW	BIH	Mahir Karić
25	MF	BIH	Gojko Cimirot
27	FW	BIH	Almir Aganspahić
28	DF	CRO	Mario Tadejević
29	DF	BIH	Amer Dupovac (Vice-captain)
30	GK	CRO	Matej Delač (on loan from Chelsea)
30	GK	BIH	Almin Abdihodžić
33	DF	BIH	Alija Čulov
50	MF	BIH	Faris Handžić
70	MF	CIV	Germain Kouadio
74	DF	CRO	Andria Petrović
77	DF	BIH	Bojan Puzigaća
88	MF	BIH	Samir Radovac
99	MF	BIH	Asmir Suljić
99	FW	BIH	Nemanja Bilbija

== Transfers ==
=== In ===
Date	Pos.	Player	From	Fee	Ref.
9 June 2013	DF	(Montenegro) Marko Radulović	(Montenegro) OFK Petrovac	Free transfer	
13 June 2013	MF	(Bosnia and Herzegovina) Gojko Cimirot	(Bosnia and Herzegovina) Leotar	€15,000	
19 June 2013	FW	(Bosnia and Herzegovina) Mahir Karić	(Bosnia and Herzegovina) Olimpic	Free transfer	
15 July 2013	DF	(Bosnia and Herzegovina) Vule Trivunović	(Bosnia and Herzegovina) Borac Banja Luka	Free transfer	
23 July 2013	FW	(Serbia) Nikola Komazec	(Thailand) Suphanburi	Undisclosed	
31 July 2013	MF	(Bosnia and Herzegovina) Anid Travančić	(Bosnia and Herzegovina) Čelik Zenica	€10,000	
1 August 2013	MF	(Bosnia and Herzegovina) Dino Bišanović	(Germany) 1. FC Köln	Free transfer	
27 August 2013	DF	(Bosnia and Herzegovina) Adnan Kovačević	(Bosnia and Herzegovina) Travnik	Free transfer	
29 August 2013	MF	(Bosnia and Herzegovina) Dušan Jevtić	Free agent	Free transfer	
29 August 2013	FW	(Bosnia and Herzegovina) Nemanja Bilbija	(Serbia) Vojvodina	Free transfer	
8 September 2013	MF	(Serbia) Irfan Vusljanin	(Serbia) Borac Čačak	Undisclosed	
9 September 2013	DF	(Bosnia and Herzegovina) Bojan Puzigaća	(Poland) Cracovia	Free transfer	
2 December 2013	MF	(Serbia) Miloš Stojčev	(Kazakhstan) Atyrau	Free transfer	
18 January 2014	FW	(Bosnia and Herzegovina) Dario Purić	(Serbia) Sloboda Užice	Free transfer	
18 January 2014	DF	(Croatia) Mario Barić	(Serbia) Vojvodina	Free transfer	
20 January 2014	FW	(North Macedonia) Krste Velkoski	(North Macedonia) Rabotnički	Free transfer	
1 February 2014	DF	(Bosnia and Herzegovina) Andrija Petrović	(Bosnia and Herzegovina) Sloga Ljubuški	Free transfer	
6 February 2014	MF	(Ivory Coast) Germain Kouadio	(Ivory Coast) Moossou	Free transfer	
Total				€25,000	

=== Out ===
Date	Pos.	Player	To	Fee	Ref.
4 June 2013	DF	(Bosnia and Herzegovina) Fadil Čizmić	(Bosnia and Herzegovina) Jedinstvo Bihać	Contract termination	
4 June 2013	MF	(Croatia) Ivan Matošević	(Croatia) Rovinj	Contract termination	
4 June 2013	DF	(Bosnia and Herzegovina) Denis Čomor	(Bosnia and Herzegovina) Slavija Sarajevo	Contract termination	
4 June 2013	DF	(Montenegro) Nemanja Mijušković	(Montenegro) Rudar Pljevlja	Contract termination	
4 June 2013	DF	(Serbia) Nemanja Zlatković	(Greece) Panachaiki	End of contract	
9 June 2013	DF	(Bosnia and Herzegovina) Sedin Torlak	(Bosnia and Herzegovina) Olimpic	End of contract	
13 June 2013	FW	(Bosnia and Herzegovina) Emir Hadžić	(Israel) Hapoel Ramat HaSharon	End of contract	
1 July 2013	MF	(Bosnia and Herzegovina) Ivan Sesar	(Turkey) Akhisarspor	End of contract	
30 July 2013	MF	(Serbia) Radan Šunjevarić	(Serbia) Borac Čačak	Contract termination	
30 July 2013	FW	(Serbia) Alen Melunović	(Poland) Widzew Łódź	Contract termination	
30 July 2013	MF	(Bosnia and Herzegovina) Anes Haurdić	Free agent	Contract termination	
28 August 2013	DF	(Montenegro) Marko Radulović	Free agent	Contract termination	
1 September 2013	MF	(Bosnia and Herzegovina) Asmir Suljić	(Hungary) Újpest	€200,000	
14 January 2014	FW	(Bosnia and Herzegovina) Ermin Huseinbašić	(Bosnia and Herzegovina) Sloboda Tuzla	Contract termination	
14 January 2014	FW	(Serbia) Nikola Komazec	(South Korea) Busan IPark	Contract termination	
21 January 2014	FW	(Bosnia and Herzegovina) Mahir Karić	(Bosnia and Herzegovina) Travnik	Contract termination	
17 February 2014	MF	(Bosnia and Herzegovina) Dino Bišanović	Free agent	Contract termination	
1 April 2014	MF	(Bosnia and Herzegovina) Dušan Jevtić	Free agent	Contract termination	
Total				€200,000	

=== Loans in ===
Start date	End date	Pos.	Player	From	Ref.
26 January 2014	End of season	GK	(Croatia) Matej Delač	(England) Chelsea	
9 February 2014	End of season	MF	(Croatia) Mato Jajalo	(Germany) 1. FC Köln	

=== Loans out ===
Start date	End date	Pos.	Player	To	Ref.
31 January 2014	End of season	MF	(Bosnia and Herzegovina) Adnan Hrelja	(Bosnia and Herzegovina) Rudar Kakanj	
17 February 2014	End of season	GK	(Bosnia and Herzegovina) Almin Abdihodžić	(Bosnia and Herzegovina) Podgrmeč	
17 February 2014	End of season	MF	(Bosnia and Herzegovina) Alija Čulov	(Bosnia and Herzegovina) Podgrmeč	

== Kit ==
Supplier	Sponsors	
(Bosnia and Herzegovina) Haad	Visit Malaysia	Front
(Bosnia and Herzegovina) Haad	(Bosnia and Herzegovina) VAKUFSKA BANKA	Back
(Bosnia and Herzegovina) Haad	(Bosnia and Herzegovina) BH Telecom	Sleeves

== Pre-season and friendlies ==
Win Draw Loss Fixtures

19 June 2013 Friendly	Maribor (Slovenia)	3–1	(Bosnia and Herzegovina) Sarajevo	Rogoza, Slovenia
18:00		Report	Todorović 57'	Attendance: 700; Referee: Samo Veselič

21 June 2013 Friendly	Sarajevo (Bosnia and Herzegovina)	0–1	(Russia) Rotor Volgograd	Szombathely, Hungary
18:00			Maksim Barsov 54'	Stadium: Rohonci Street Stadium; Attendance: 100

25 June 2013 Friendly	Sarajevo (Bosnia and Herzegovina)	0–2	(Iran) Sepahan	Murska Sobota, Slovenia
18:00	Mario Tadejević (penalty missed)

29 June 2013 Friendly	Sarajevo (Bosnia and Herzegovina)	1–2	(Bosnia and Herzegovina) Slavija Sarajevo	Sarajevo
18:00	Todorović 40'	SportSport		Stadium: Stadion Otoka; Attendance: 250

6 July 2013 Friendly	Famos Hrasnica (Bosnia and Herzegovina)	2–3	(Bosnia and Herzegovina) Sarajevo	Ilidža
17:00			Karić; Plakalo; Kovačević

14 July 2013 Friendly	Famos Vojkovići (Bosnia and Herzegovina)	0–4	(Bosnia and Herzegovina) Sarajevo	Vojkovići
17:30		FKSinfo	Karić; Aganspahić; Osmanagić	Stadium: Sportski centar Vojkovići

7 August 2013 Friendly	Bosna Visoko (Bosnia and Herzegovina)	0–1	(Bosnia and Herzegovina) Sarajevo	Visoko
18:00			Plakalo	Stadium: Gradski stadion Luke (Visoko)

21 August 2013 Friendly	UNIS Vogošća (Bosnia and Herzegovina)	1–8	(Bosnia and Herzegovina) Sarajevo	Vogošća
18:30			Plakalo; Huseinbašić; Aganspahić	Stadium: Stadion Hakija Mršo

10 September 2013 Friendly	Slavija Sarajevo (Bosnia and Herzegovina)	0–0	(Bosnia and Herzegovina) Sarajevo	Istočno Sarajevo
16:30

11 October 2013 Friendly	Pécsi (Hungary)	2–1	(Bosnia and Herzegovina) Sarajevo	Pécs, Hungary
16:30			Bilbija (penalty scored)	Stadium: Stadion PMFC; Attendance: 150; Referee: Botló Béla

14 October 2013 Friendly	Odžak 102 (Bosnia and Herzegovina)	1–5	(Bosnia and Herzegovina) Sarajevo	Odžak
15:30			Komazec; Bilbija 55', 58', 62'; Huseinbašić 63'

22 January 2014 Friendly	Brotnjo (Bosnia and Herzegovina)	0–4	(Bosnia and Herzegovina) Sarajevo	Čitluk
14:30			Travančić 6'; Velkoski 31'; Kovačević 69'; Bilbija (pen.)	Stadium: Stadion Bare

25 January 2014 Friendly	Sloga Ljubuški (Bosnia and Herzegovina)	0–3	(Bosnia and Herzegovina) Sarajevo	Ljubuški
14:30			Velkoski; Travančić; Purić	Stadium: Stadion Babovac; Referee: Goran Paradžik

3 February 2014 Friendly	Sarajevo (Bosnia and Herzegovina)	2–1	(Ukraine) Metalurh Zaporizhya	Antalya, Turkey
16:30	Bilbija 18', 28'

6 February 2014 Friendly	Sarajevo (Bosnia and Herzegovina)	0–2	(South Korea) Pohang Steelers	Antalya, Turkey
16:30

9 February 2014 Friendly	Partizan (Serbia)	1–0	(Bosnia and Herzegovina) Sarajevo	Antalya, Turkey
13:00				Stadium: SC World of Wonders; Attendance: 100

10 February 2014 Friendly	Sarajevo (Bosnia and Herzegovina)	3–1	(Switzerland) Solothurn	Antalya, Turkey
	Kouadio; Aganspahić; Handžić

13 February 2014 Friendly	Sarajevo (Bosnia and Herzegovina)	1–0	(Georgia (country)) Dila Gori	Antalya, Turkey
16:30	Velkoski 26'

22 February 2014 Friendly	Zrinjski Mostar (Bosnia and Herzegovina)	0–2	(Bosnia and Herzegovina) Sarajevo	Mostar
14:30			Todorović

== Competitions ==
=== Overview ===
Competition	First match	Last match	Starting round	Final position	Record							
Competition	First match	Last match	Starting round	Final position	Pld	W	D	L	GF	GA	GD	Win %
Premier League	28 July 2013	10 May 2014	Matchday 1	3rd	30	16	10	4	45	21	+24	53.33
Cup of BiH	17 September 2013	23 May 2014	First round	Winners	9	5	4	0	18	7	+11	55.56
Europa League	4 July 2013	25 July 2013	First qualifying round	Second qualifying round	4	2	1	1	5	4	+1	50.00
Total					43	23	15	5	68	32	+36	53.49

Source: Competitions

=== Premier League ===
==== League table ====
Pos	Team	Pld	W	D	L	GF	GA	GD	Pts	Qualification or relegation
1	Zrinjski (C)	30	18	7	5	56	21	+35	61	Qualification to Champions League second qualifying round
2	Široki Brijeg	30	17	8	5	66	23	+43	59	Qualification to Europa League first qualifying round
3	Sarajevo	30	16	10	4	45	21	+24	58	Qualification to Europa League second qualifying round (Note: Sarajevo qualified for 2014–15 UEFA Europa League second qualifying round by winning the 2013–14 Bosnia and Herzegovina Football Cup.)
4	Željezničar	30	16	9	5	51	29	+22	57	Qualification to Europa League first qualifying round
5	Velež	30	15	9	6	42	23	+19	54	

Source: SportSport.ba (in Bosnian)
Rules for classification: 1st points; 2nd goal difference; 3rd goals scored
For deciding champions, qualification to UEFA Europa League and relegation: 1st points; 2nd head-to-head points; 3rd head-to-head goal difference; 4th head-to-head goals scored; 5th head-to-head away goals scored; 6th goal difference; 7th goals scored.
(C) Champions

==== Results summary ====
Overall								Home						Away					
Pld	W	D	L	GF	GA	GD	Pts	W	D	L	GF	GA	GD	W	D	L	GF	GA	GD
30	16	10	4	45	21	+24	58	10	3	2	30	12	+18	6	7	2	15	9	+6

Source: Sportsport.ba

==== Results by round ====
Round	1	2	3	4	5	6	7	8	9	10	11	12	13	14	15	16	17	18	19	20	21	22	23	24	25	26	27	28	29	30
Ground	H	A	H	A	H	A	H	A	H	H	A	H	A	H	A	A	H	A	H	A	H	A	H	A	A	H	A	H	A	H
Result	W	D	L	W	W	W	D	D	L	W	D	W	W	D	W	D	W	L	W	L	D	W	W	D	D	W	W	W	D	W
Position	3	6	8	9	2	2	2	2	4	3	3	2	2	2	2	2	2	5	2	4	4	4	3	4	4	4	4	4	4	3

Source: Competitions
A = Away; H = Home; W = Win; D = Draw; L = Loss

==== Matches ====
28 July 2013 1	Sarajevo	1–0	Zrinjski	Sarajevo
21:00	Suljić (yellow card) 54'; Džakmić 57'; Todorović (yellow card) 59'; Musemić (red card) 89'; Osmanagić (yellow card) 90'	Report		Stadium: Asim Ferhatović Hase Stadium; Attendance: 1,500; Referee: Vladimir Bjelica (I. Sarajevo)

4 August 2013 2	Slavija	0–0	Sarajevo	Istočno Sarajevo
17:00		Report		Stadium: Gradski SRC Slavija; Attendance: 1,500; Referee: Goran Paradžik (Ljubuški)

11 August 2013 3	Sarajevo	1–2	Široki Brijeg	Sarajevo
20:45	Todorović (yellow card) 59'; Suljić 60' (yellow card) 69'; Tatomirović (yellow card) 68'	Report		Stadium: Asim Ferhatović Hase Stadium; Attendance: 1,500; Referee: Edin Jakupović (Bihać)

17 August 2013 4	Leotar	1–2	Sarajevo	Trebinje
17:00		Report	Komazec 6'; Radovac (yellow card) 27'; Trivunović (yellow card) 38'; Tadejević (yellow card) 53'; Karić (yellow card) 76'; Osmanagić 79'	Stadium: Stadion Police; Attendance: 800; Referee: Ilija Živković (Orašje)

24 August 2013 5	Sarajevo	3–0	Čelik	Sarajevo
19:00	Todorović (yellow card) 4'; Komazec 45+2', 75'; Suljić 77'	Report		Stadium: Asim Ferhatović Hase Stadium; Attendance: 2,000; Referee: Dragan Skakić (Gradiška)

31 August 2013 6	Olimpic	0–2	Sarajevo	Sarajevo
16:30		Report	Komazec 17'; Dupovac (yellow card) 48'; Bišanović (yellow card) 52'; Trivunović (yellow card) 54'; Suljić (yellow card) 80'; Radovac (yellow card) 88'; Huseinbašić 90'	Stadium: Stadion Otoka; Attendance: 2,500; Referee: Edin Jakupović (Bihać)

14 September 2013 7	Sarajevo	0–0	Mladost Velika Obarska	Sarajevo
16:00	Kovačević (yellow card) 90'	Report		Stadium: Asim Ferhatović Hase Stadium; Attendance: 2,500; Referee: Muamer Bureković (Zenica)

21 September 2013 8	Velež	0–0	Sarajevo	Mostar
16:00		Report	Trivunović (yellow card) 46'; Kovačević (yellow card) 62'	Stadium: Vrapčići Stadium; Attendance: 2,500; Referee: Vladimir Bjelica (I. Sarajevo)

25 September 2013 9	Sarajevo	0–3 (awd.)	Borac	Sarajevo
17:00		Report		Stadium: Asim Ferhatović Hase Stadium; Attendance: 4,500; Referee: Goran Paradžik (Ljubuški)
Note: Borac were awarded a 3–0 win against Sarajevo after the latter's fans entered the pitch in the 70th minute.

29 September 2013 10	Sarajevo	3–2	Rudar	Sarajevo
15:30	Komazec 12'; Todorović 22'; Travančić 67'	Report		Stadium: Asim Ferhatović Hase Stadium; Attendance: 0 Referee: Husein Terzić (Travnik)

5 October 2013 11	Zvijezda	0–0	Sarajevo	Gradačac
15:30		Report	Cimirot (yellow card) 79'	Stadium: Banja Ilidža (Gradačac); Attendance: 1,500; Referee: Muamer Bureković (Zenica)

19 October 2013 12	Sarajevo	3–1	Travnik	Sarajevo
15:00	Todorović 7'; Bišanović (yellow card) 43'; Tatomirović (yellow card) 45'; Puzigaća (yellow card) 47'; Komazec 50'; Tadejević (pen.); Karić (yellow card) 86'	Report		Stadium: Asim Ferhatović Hase Stadium; Attendance: 0 Referee: Elvis Mujić (Banovići)

26 October 2013 13	Vitez	0–2	Sarajevo	Travnik
14:30		Report	Tadejević (pen.); Komazec (yellow card) 51'; Bišanović (yellow card) 61'; Tatomirović 76'	Stadium: Stadion Pirota; Attendance: 1,200; Referee: Dragan Skakić (B. Gradiška)

30 October 2013 14	Sarajevo	0–0	Željezničar	Sarajevo
19:45		Report		Stadium: Asim Ferhatović Hase Stadium; Attendance: 12,000; Referee: Vladimir Bjelica (I. Sarajevo)

3 November 2013 15	Radnik	1–2	Sarajevo	Bijeljina
13:30		Report	Puzigaća (pen.); Komazec 44'	Stadium: Bijeljina City Stadium; Attendance: 700; Referee: Ilija Živković (Orašje)

10 November 2013 16	Zrinjski	1–1	Sarajevo	Mostar
15:00		Report	Komazec 7' (yellow card) 19'; Vusljanin (yellow card) 23'; Todorović (yellow card) 86'	Stadium: Stadion pod Bijelim Brijegom; Attendance: 1,500; Referee: Dragan Skakić (Gradiška)

17 November 2013 17	Sarajevo	3–0	Slavija	Sarajevo
17:00	Jevtić (yellow card) 20'; Todorović (yellow card) 21'; Puzigaća 54'; Karić 74'; Komazec 77'; Plakalo (yellow card) 90'	Report		Stadium: Asim Ferhatović Hase Stadium; Attendance: 800; Referee: Darko Obradović (Stolac)

24 November 2013 18	Široki Brijeg	2–0	Sarajevo	Široki Brijeg
17:00		Report	Puzigaća (yellow card) 26'; Vusljanin (yellow card) 30'; Cimirot (yellow card) 34'; Karić (yellow card) 36'; Trivunović (yellow card) 71'; Todorović (yellow card) 72'	Stadium: Stadion Pecara; Attendance: 1,500; Referee: Vladimir Bjelica (I. Sarajevo)

30 November 2013 19	Sarajevo	3–0	Leotar	Sarajevo
17:00	Komazec 4'; Travančić 17'; Dupovac 25'; Huseinbašić (red card) 80'	Report		Stadium: Asim Ferhatović Hase Stadium; Attendance: 800; Referee: Darko Obradović (Stolac)

1 March 2014 20	Čelik	1–0	Sarajevo	Zenica
14:30		Report	Todorović (yellow card) 68'; Osmanagić (yellow card) 90+4'	Stadium: Bilino Polje Stadium; Attendance: 6,500; Referee: Edin Jakupović (Bihać)

9 March 2014 21	Sarajevo	1–1	Olimpic	Sarajevo
18:30	Velkoski 33'	Report		Stadium: Asim Ferhatović Hase Stadium; Attendance: 6,000; Referee: Muamer Bureković (Zenica)

16 March 2014 22	Mladost Velika Obarska	0–2	Sarajevo	Bijeljina
15:00		Report	Todorović 19'; Tatomirović (yellow card) 28'; Jajalo (yellow card) 64'; Velkoski 80'	Stadium: Gradski stadion (Bijeljina); Attendance: 700; Referee: Goran Paradžik (Ljubuški)

23 March 2014 23	Sarajevo	2–1	Velež	Sarajevo
15:30	Velkoski 17'; Stojčev 75'	Report		Stadium: Asim Ferhatović Hase Stadium; Attendance: 4,000; Referee: Dragan Skakić (Gradiška)

29 March 2014 24	Borac	0–0	Sarajevo	Banja Luka
17:00		Report	Puzigaća (yellow card) 44'; Trivunović (yellow card) 66'; Bilbija (yellow card) 79'	Stadium: Banja Luka City Stadium; Attendance: 2,500; Referee: Danijel Pajić (Bijeljina)

6 April 2014 25	Rudar	0–0	Sarajevo	Prijedor
16:30		Report		Stadium: Gradski stadion (Prijedor); Attendance: 1,200; Referee: Muamer Bureković (Zenica)

11 April 2014 26	Sarajevo	3–0	Zvijezda	Sarajevo
19:00	Velkoski 41'; Purić 63'; Bilbija (yellow card) 32' (goal) 90+2'	Report		Stadium: Asim Ferhatović Hase Stadium; Attendance: 3,000; Referee: Emir Spahalić (Mostar)

19 April 2014 27	Travnik	2–3	Sarajevo	Travnik
16:30		Report	Purić (yellow card) 36'; Dupovac (red card) 50'; Puzigaća (yellow card) 51'; Velkoski 60'; Stojčev 77'; Bilbija (yellow card) 45' (goal) 81'	Stadium: Stadion Pirota; Attendance: 2,500; Referee: Predrag Stankić (Bijeljina)

26 April 2014 28	Sarajevo	4–0	Vitez	Sarajevo
17:00	Kovačević 30'; Velkoski 44', 65'; Travančić 88'	Report		Stadium: Asim Ferhatović Hase Stadium; Attendance: 1,200; Referee: Danijel Pajić (Bijeljina)

4 May 2014 29	Željezničar	1–1	Sarajevo	Sarajevo
17:00		Report	Puzigaća 39' (yellow card) 75'; Trivunović (yellow card) 60'; Tatomirović (yellow card) 86'; Stojčev (yellow card) 90'	Stadium: Stadion Grbavica; Attendance: 7,500; Referee: Edin Jakupović (Bihać)

10 May 2014 30	Sarajevo	3–2	Radnik	Sarajevo
17:00	Puzigaća 6'; Velkoski 11'; Vusljanin 58'	Report		Stadium: Asim Ferhatović Hase Stadium; Attendance: 2,000; Referee: Elvis Mujić (Banovići)

=== Cup of Bosnia and Herzegovina ===
==== Round of 32 ====
17 September 2013	Podgrmeč	2–7	Sarajevo	Sanski Most
16:00		Report	Komazec 22', 67', 86'; Osmanagić 26'; Todorović 46'; Tadejević 69'; Puzigaća 90'	Stadium: Gradski stadion (Sanski Most); Attendance: 800; Referee: Dragan Skakić (Gradiška)

==== Round of 16 ====
22 October 2013 First leg	Vitez	1–1	Sarajevo	Travnik
15:00		Report	Abdihodžić (yellow card); Huseinbašić (yellow card); Todorović 60' (yellow card)	Stadium: Stadion Pirota; Attendance: 600

6 November 2013 Second leg	Sarajevo	1–1 (2–2 agg.) (3–1 p)	Vitez	Sarajevo
13:30	Tatomirović (yellow card); Komazec 39'; Todorović (yellow card)	Report		Stadium: Asim Ferhatović Hase Stadium; Attendance: 200; Referee: Elvis Mujić (Banovići)
	Penalties
	Trivunović (penalty scored); Todorović (penalty scored); Mario Tadejević (penalty missed); Anid Travančić (penalty missed); Bojan Puzigaća (penalty scored)		Mišić (penalty missed); Brekalo (penalty scored); Kapetan (penalty missed); Branković (penalty missed)

==== Quarter-finals ====
12 March 2014 First leg	Željezničar	1–1	Sarajevo	Sarajevo
18:00		Report	Bilbija (yellow card) 9'; Jajalo 47' (yellow card) 72'; Puzigaća (yellow card) 79'; Dupovac (yellow card) 90+2'	Stadium: Stadion Grbavica; Attendance: 7,500; Referee: Ognjen Valjić (Banja Luka)

26 March 2014 Second leg	Sarajevo	0–0 (1 (a)–1 agg.)	Željezničar	Sarajevo
19:00		Report		Stadium: Asim Ferhatović Hase Stadium; Attendance: 13,000; Referee: Ognjen Valjić (Banja Luka)

==== Semi-finals ====
2 April 2014 First leg	Sarajevo	0–0	Zrinjski	Sarajevo
18:30	Travančić (yellow card) 31'	Report		Stadium: Asim Ferhatović Hase Stadium; Attendance: 4,500; Referee: Dragan Skakić (Gradiška)

16 April 2014 Second leg	Zrinjski	1–3 (1–3 agg.)	Sarajevo	Mostar
18:00		Report	Stojčev 15'; Puzigaća (yellow card) 77'; Bilbija 80'; Velkoski 90+3'	Stadium: Stadion pod Bijelim Brijegom; Attendance: 3,500; Referee: Ognjen Valjić (Banja Luka)

==== Final ====
7 May 2014 First leg	Čelik	0–2	Sarajevo	Zenica
17:00		Report	Trivunović 43'; Bilbija (yellow card) 52'; Tatomirović (yellow card) 55'; Velkoski (yellow card) 67'; Vusljanin (yellow card) 84'; Stojčev 90+4'	Stadium: Bilino Polje Stadium; Attendance: 8,500; Referee: Ognjen Valjić (Banja Luka)

23 May 2014 Second leg	Sarajevo	3–1 (5–1 agg.)	Čelik	Sarajevo
17:00	Bilbija (yellow card) 27'; Velkoski 67'; Puzigaća 69'; Bilbija 83'	Report		Stadium: Asim Ferhatović Hase Stadium; Attendance: 9,000; Referee: Edin Jakupović (Bihać)

=== UEFA Europa League ===
==== First qualifying round ====
4 July 2013 First leg	Sarajevo (Bosnia and Herzegovina)	1–0	(San Marino) Libertas	Sarajevo, Bosnia and Herzegovina
20:30 CEST (UTC+2)	Melunović 19'	Report	Rosti (yellow card) 39'; Dall'Ara (yellow card) 45+2'; Simoncini (yellow card) 82'	Stadium: Asim Ferhatović Hase Stadium; Attendance: 6,500; Referee: Christos Nicolaides (Cyprus)

11 July 2013 Second leg	Libertas (San Marino)	1–2 (1–3 agg.)	(Bosnia and Herzegovina) Sarajevo	Serravalle, San Marino
21:00 CEST (UTC+2)	Simoncini (yellow card) 10'; Camillini (yellow card) 13'; Morelli 28'; Antonelli (yellow card) 66'	Report	Haurdić 2'; Tadejević (yellow card) 41'; Todorović 45+1'; Suljić (yellow card) 52'	Stadium: Stadio Olimpico; Attendance: 665; Referee: Rahim Hasanov (Azerbaijan)

==== Second qualifying round ====
18 July 2013 First leg	Kukësi (Albania)	3–2	(Bosnia and Herzegovina) Sarajevo	Tirana, Albania
19:30 CEST (UTC+2)	Hoxha 24'; Popović 45+1'; Peqini (yellow card) 50'; Allmuça 58'	Report	Popović 32' (o.g.); Todorović 33'; Tadejević (yellow card) 88'; Suljić (yellow card) 90'; Melunović (yellow card) 90+3'	Stadium: Qemal Stafa Stadium; Attendance: 4,500; Referee: Adrien Jaccottet (Switzerland)

25 July 2013 Second leg	Sarajevo (Bosnia and Herzegovina)	0–0 (2–3 agg.)	(Albania) Kukësi	Sarajevo, Bosnia and Herzegovina
21:00 CEST (UTC+2)	Melunović (penalty missed) 68'	Report	Peqini (yellow card) 29'; Malindi (yellow card) 44'; Karabeci (yellow card) 90+3'	Stadium: Asim Ferhatović Hase Stadium; Attendance: 14,000; Referee: Mikhail Vilkov (Russia)

== Statistics ==
Appearances

Rank	Player	Games
1.	(Bosnia and Herzegovina) Amer Dupovac	38+12
2.	(Serbia) Ivan Tatomirović	38+12
3.	(Bosnia and Herzegovina) Gojko Cimirot	38+10
4.	(Bosnia and Herzegovina) Ognjen Todorović	35+9
5.	(Bosnia and Herzegovina) Dejan Bandović	34+11

Goalscorers

Rank	Player	Goals
1.	(Serbia) Nikola Komazec	14+1
2.	(North Macedonia) Krste Velkoski	10+3
3.	(Bosnia and Herzegovina) Ognjen Todorović	8+4
4.	(Bosnia and Herzegovina) Bojan Puzigaća	7
5.	(Serbia) Miloš Stojčev	4
