= List of Bosnia and Herzegovina football transfers summer 2013 =

This is a list of transfers in Bosnian football for the 2013 summer transfer window. Only moves featuring a Premier League of Bosnia and Herzegovina, First League of the Republika Srpska and First League of the Federation of Bosnia and Herzegovina side are listed.

== Premier League of Bosnia and Herzegovina ==
=== Borac Banja Luka ===
In: Note: Flags indicate national team as defined under FIFA eligibility rules; some limited exceptions apply. Players may hold more than one non-FIFA nationality.

No.	Pos.	Nation	Player
—	GK	BIH	Nikola Stijaković (from (Serbia) Spartak ZV)
17	MF	BIH	Ognjen Đelmić (from Olimpic)
10	FW	BIH	Fedor Predragović (from Borac Banja Luka U19)
7	MF	BIH	Momir Žečević (from Borac Banja Luka U19)
27	DF	BIH	Miloš Perović (from Borac Banja Luka U19)
—	GK	BIH	Mladen Ilić (free)
—	MF	BIH	Milan Šakić (loan return from Sloboda Mrkonjić Grad)
25	GK	BIH	Dragan Đorđić (free, last with Radnik Bijeljina)
—	DF	BIH	Ognjen Petrović (on loan from (Serbia) Javor Ivanjica)
—	MF	SRB	Igor Žuržinov (free)

Out: Note: Flags indicate national team as defined under FIFA eligibility rules; some limited exceptions apply. Players may hold more than one non-FIFA nationality.

No.	Pos.	Nation	Player
10	FW	BIH	Nemanja Bilbija (loan return to (Serbia) Vojvodina)
9	FW	BIH	Admir Raščić (to (Hong Kong) Sun Pegasus)
5	DF	SRB	Mladen Zeljković (to Željezničar)
20	MF	BIH	Vedran Kantar (to Zrinjski)
7	MF	BIH	Dalibor Teinović (released)
6	DF	SRB	Milan Stupar (released)
30	GK	BIH	Siniša Marčetić (released)
25	GK	BIH	Dalibor Kozić (released)
—	MF	BIH	Obren Cvijanović (released)
—	DF	BIH	Radoš Jotanović (released)
—	FW	BIH	Nemanja Vidović (released)
26	DF	BIH	Vule Trivunović (released)
33	MF	BIH	Darko Maletić (released)
—	GK	BIH	Mladen Lučić (loan extension to Radnik)
—	DF	BIH	Srđan Stojnić (to (Germany) Astoria Walldorf)

=== Čelik ===
In: Note: Flags indicate national team as defined under FIFA eligibility rules; some limited exceptions apply. Players may hold more than one non-FIFA nationality.

No.	Pos.	Nation	Player
15	FW	BIH	Marin Popović (from Čelik U19)
16	MF	BIH	Dženan Bureković (from Čelik U19)
4	DF	BIH	Sead Jakupović (from (Switzerland) Winterthur)
17	FW	BIH	Haris Ribić (from Sloboda Tuzla)
5	DF	BIH	Renato Gojković (from Sloboda Tuzla)

Out: Note: Flags indicate national team as defined under FIFA eligibility rules; some limited exceptions apply. Players may hold more than one non-FIFA nationality.

No.	Pos.	Nation	Player
14	DF	BIH	Zoran Brković (to Zrinjski)
5	DF	NED	Stefan Maletić (to (Germany) Stuttgarter Kickers)
—	FW	BIH	Ernad Džananović (to Travnik)
—	MF	BIH	Anid Travančić (to Sarajevo)

=== Leotar ===
In: Note: Flags indicate national team as defined under FIFA eligibility rules; some limited exceptions apply. Players may hold more than one non-FIFA nationality.

No.	Pos.	Nation	Player
—	FW	BIH	Boban Đerić (from (Serbia) Inđija)
—	DF	SRB	Predrag Topuzović (from (Serbia) Hajduk Beograd)
—	DF	CRO	Denis Bajalica (free, last with Rudar Prijedor)

Out: Note: Flags indicate national team as defined under FIFA eligibility rules; some limited exceptions apply. Players may hold more than one non-FIFA nationality.

No.	Pos.	Nation	Player
20	MF	BIH	Gojko Cimirot (to Sarajevo)
10	MF	MNE	Miloš Stojčev (to (Kazakhstan) Atyrau)
—	MF	SRB	Stevan Luković (loan return to (Serbia) Red Star Belgrade)
18	DF	SRB	Borko Novaković (to Zvijezda Gradačac)
11	MF	SRB	Dejan Janković (to Zvijezda Gradačac)

=== Mladost Velika Obarska ===
In: Note: Flags indicate national team as defined under FIFA eligibility rules; some limited exceptions apply. Players may hold more than one non-FIFA nationality.

No.	Pos.	Nation	Player
—	MF	BIH	Anel Ramić (from Rudar Prijedor)
—	MF	MNE	Darko Bošković (from (Serbia) Proleter Novi Sad)
—	MF	SRB	Dušan Zelić (from (Serbia) Inđija)
—	MF	SRB	Aleksandar Avrić (from (Serbia) Inđija)
—	FW	BIH	Aleksandar Nikolić (from Željezničar)
—	DF	BIH	Jovan Svitlica (free)

Out: Note: Flags indicate national team as defined under FIFA eligibility rules; some limited exceptions apply. Players may hold more than one non-FIFA nationality.

No.	Pos.	Nation	Player

=== Olympic ===
In: Note: Flags indicate national team as defined under FIFA eligibility rules; some limited exceptions apply. Players may hold more than one non-FIFA nationality.

No.	Pos.	Nation	Player
—	DF	BIH	Alen Merajić (free)
—	MF	BIH	Dino Gabela (free)
—	MF	BIH	Amar Rahmanović (from (Serbia) Novi Pazar)
—	MF	BIH	Sulejman Smajić (free)

Out: Note: Flags indicate national team as defined under FIFA eligibility rules; some limited exceptions apply. Players may hold more than one non-FIFA nationality.

No.	Pos.	Nation	Player
—	MF	BIH	Sead Bučan (to Željezničar)
7	MF	BIH	Mahir Karić (to Sarajevo)
13	MF	BIH	Perica Ivetić (released)
18	MF	CRO	Marko Mišić (to Vitez)
14	MF	BIH	Ognjen Đelmić (to Borac Banja Luka)

=== Radnik ===
In: Note: Flags indicate national team as defined under FIFA eligibility rules; some limited exceptions apply. Players may hold more than one non-FIFA nationality.

No.	Pos.	Nation	Player
—	MF	BIH	Ognjen Radulović (from Rudar Prijedor)
—	MF	BIH	Emir Selimović (from Gradina)
—	MF	SRB	Slađan Antić (from (Serbia) Smederevska Palanka)
—	FW	BIH	Milivoje Lazić (from Rudar Ugljevik)
—	FW	GRE	Athanasios Kiourkas (from (Germany) FC Dachau)
—	GK	BIH	Mladen Lučić (on loan from Borac Banja Luka)
—	MF	BIH	Mario Desnica (from Sloboda Novi Grad)
—	FW	BIH	Mirza Hasanović (from Borac Šamac)
—	MF	BIH	Stojko Kikić (from (Switzerland) Yverdon-Sport)
—	FW	BIH	Dejan Vučić (from Podrinje)

Out: Note: Flags indicate national team as defined under FIFA eligibility rules; some limited exceptions apply. Players may hold more than one non-FIFA nationality.

No.	Pos.	Nation	Player
7	MF	SRB	Marko Basara (released)
8	MF	BIH	Armin Kapetan (released)
10	MF	BIH	Danijel Ćulum (released)
—	MF	SRB	Željko Karamatić (released)
4	MF	BIH	Igor Mirković (to Rudar Prijedor)
—	GK	BIH	Dragan Đorđić (released, next signed Borac Banja Luka)

=== Rudar Prijedor ===
In: Note: Flags indicate national team as defined under FIFA eligibility rules; some limited exceptions apply. Players may hold more than one non-FIFA nationality.

No.	Pos.	Nation	Player
—	MF	BIH	Igor Mirković (from Radnik)
—	FW	SRB	Slobodan Milanović (free)
—	MF	BIH	Mirko Tica (from Sutjeska Foča)
—	DF	BIH	Nemanja Pekija (from Sloboda Novi Grad)
—	DF	BIH	Milovan Aćić (from Troglav)
—	DF	BIH	Branko Ilinčić (from Radnik Urije)
—	GK	CRO	Štefan Herak (from (Croatia) Istra Pula)
—	DF	BIH	Dragoslav Stakić (free)
—	FW	BIH	Lazar Vidić (free, last with Velež)
—	DF	SRB	Dušan Mladenović (from (Serbia) Sloga Kraljevo)

Out: Note: Flags indicate national team as defined under FIFA eligibility rules; some limited exceptions apply. Players may hold more than one non-FIFA nationality.

No.	Pos.	Nation	Player
10	MF	BIH	Ognjen Radulović (released)
11	FW	BIH	Haris Handžić (to (Switzerland) Vaduz)
21	MF	BIH	Nemanja Kokanović (released)
6	MF	BIH	Anel Ramić (released)
14	FW	BIH	Miloš Srndović (released)
8	MF	CRO	Mato Ivanović (released])
—	DF	CRO	Denis Bajalica (released])
—	GK	BIH	Danijel Milanović (to (Serbia) -)
4	DF	BIH	Miodrag Gigović (released)
16	DF	CRO	Tomislav Puljić (released)
2	DF	DOM	Eduardo Acevedo (released)
5	DF	BIH	Boris Savić (released)
22	FW	SRB	Veljko Vuković (released)

=== Sarajevo ===
In: Note: Flags indicate national team as defined under FIFA eligibility rules; some limited exceptions apply. Players may hold more than one non-FIFA nationality.

No.	Pos.	Nation	Player
4	DF	MNE	Marko Radulović (from (Montenegro) OFK Petrovac)
25	MF	BIH	Gojko Cimirot (from Leotar)
23	MF	BIH	Mahir Karić (from Olimpic)
20	DF	BIH	Vule Trivunović (free, last with Borac Banja Luka)
77	DF	BIH	Bojan Puzigaća (from (Poland) Cracovia)
11	FW	SRB	Nikola Komazec (free, last with (Thailand) Suphanburi)
9	MF	BIH	Anid Travančić (from Čelik Zenica)
8	MF	BIH	Dino Bišanović (from (Germany) 1. FC Köln II)
10	MF	BIH	Dušan Jevtić (from (Germany) MSV Duisburg)
21	MF	SRB	Irfan Vušljanin (from (Serbia) FK Borac Čačak)
99	FW	BIH	Nemanja Bilbija (from FK Borac Banja Luka)
6	DF	BIH	Adnan Kovačević (from NK Travnik)

Out: Note: Flags indicate national team as defined under FIFA eligibility rules; some limited exceptions apply. Players may hold more than one non-FIFA nationality.

No.	Pos.	Nation	Player
23	FW	CRO	Ivan Matošević (released)
4	DF	MNE	Nemanja Mijušković (to (Montenegro) Rudar Pljevlja)
77	MF	SRB	Nemanja Zlatković (released)
6	DF	BIH	Sedin Torlak (released)
11	FW	BIH	Emir Hadžić (released)
17	DF	BIH	Denis Čomor (to Slavija)
9	FW	SRB	Alen Melunović (released)
16	MF	SRB	Radan Šunjevarić (released)
8	MF	BIH	Anes Haurdić (released)
99	MF	BIH	Asmir Suljić (to (Hungary) Újpest FC)
25	DF	BIH	Fadil Čizmić

=== Široki Brijeg ===
In: Note: Flags indicate national team as defined under FIFA eligibility rules; some limited exceptions apply. Players may hold more than one non-FIFA nationality.

No.	Pos.	Nation	Player
—	MF	BIH	Vlado Zadro (from (Croatia) Solin)
—	MF	CRO	Zoran Plazonić (free)

Out: Note: Flags indicate national team as defined under FIFA eligibility rules; some limited exceptions apply. Players may hold more than one non-FIFA nationality.

No.	Pos.	Nation	Player
26	MF	BIH	Zvonimir Kožulj (on loan to Vitez)
5	DF	BIH	Slavko Brekalo (on loan to Vitez)

=== Slavija ===
In: Note: Flags indicate national team as defined under FIFA eligibility rules; some limited exceptions apply. Players may hold more than one non-FIFA nationality.

No.	Pos.	Nation	Player
—	DF	BIH	Vedad Šabanović (from GOŠK)
—	DF	BIH	Denis Čomor (from Sarajevo)
—	MF	SRB	Filip Osman (from (Serbia) Smederevo)
—	MF	BIH	Srećko Mitrović (from (Indonesia) Deltras)
—	DF	BIH	Darko Mitrović (from Sutjeska Foča)
—	MF	SRB	Žarko Karamatić (free, last with Radnik Bijeljina)

Out: Note: Flags indicate national team as defined under FIFA eligibility rules; some limited exceptions apply. Players may hold more than one non-FIFA nationality.

No.	Pos.	Nation	Player
7	FW	BIH	Dejan Rašević (released)
4	DF	BIH	Jovan Svitlica (released)
10	FW	BIH	Zoran Kokot (released)
1	GK	BIH	Ratko Dujković (to Zrinjski)

=== Travnik ===
In: Note: Flags indicate national team as defined under FIFA eligibility rules; some limited exceptions apply. Players may hold more than one non-FIFA nationality.

No.	Pos.	Nation	Player
—	MF	BIH	Haris Seferović (from Iskra)
—	FW	BIH	Rifet Melić (from Travnik U19)
—	FW	BIH	Enver Kunić (from Čelik U19)
—	GK	BIH	Semir Bukvić (from Željezničar)
—	FW	BIH	Mirsad Ramić (on loan from Željezničar)
—	MF	BIH	Almir Pliska (from Velež)
—	MF	BIH	Ajdin Nuhić (from Velež)
—	FW	BIH	Ernad Džananović (from Čelik Zenica)

Out: Note: Flags indicate national team as defined under FIFA eligibility rules; some limited exceptions apply. Players may hold more than one non-FIFA nationality.

No.	Pos.	Nation	Player
—	GK	BIH	Anel Pjanić (released)
17	MF	CRO	Deni Simeunović (released)
9	FW	CRO	Nebojša Popović (released)
—	FW	BIH	Nedo Turković (released)
25	DF	BIH	Senad Tabaković (released)
5	DF	BIH	Nihad Ribić (released)

=== Velež ===
In: Note: Flags indicate national team as defined under FIFA eligibility rules; some limited exceptions apply. Players may hold more than one non-FIFA nationality.

No.	Pos.	Nation	Player
—	FW	BIH	Sabahudin Jusufbašić (from GOŠK)
—	MF	BIH	Sinan Ramović (from GOŠK)
—	FW	BIH	Dejan Rašević (free)

Out: Note: Flags indicate national team as defined under FIFA eligibility rules; some limited exceptions apply. Players may hold more than one non-FIFA nationality.

No.	Pos.	Nation	Player
—	MF	BIH	Aldin Šišić (to Vitez)
21	MF	BIH	Ajdin Nuhić (released)
—	MF	BIH	Ibrahim Škahić (released)
—	MF	BIH	Almir Pliska (to Travnik)
9	FW	BIH	Lazar Vidić (released, next signed Rudar Prijedor)

=== Vitez ===
In: Note: Flags indicate national team as defined under FIFA eligibility rules; some limited exceptions apply. Players may hold more than one non-FIFA nationality.

No.	Pos.	Nation	Player
—	MF	BIH	Aldin Šišić (from Velež)
—	MF	BIH	Zvonimir Kožulj (on loan from Široki Brijeg)
—	DF	BIH	Slavko Brekalo (on loan from Široki Brijeg)
—	MF	CRO	Marko Mišić (from Olimpic)
—	MF	BIH	Armin Kapetan (free, last with Radnik)

Out: Note: Flags indicate national team as defined under FIFA eligibility rules; some limited exceptions apply. Players may hold more than one non-FIFA nationality.

No.	Pos.	Nation	Player

=== Željezničar ===
In: Note: Flags indicate national team as defined under FIFA eligibility rules; some limited exceptions apply. Players may hold more than one non-FIFA nationality.

No.	Pos.	Nation	Player
15	FW	BIH	Armin Hodžić (on loan from (England) Liverpool)
21	DF	SRB	Mladen Zeljković (from Borac Banja Luka)
7	MF	BIH	Sead Bučan (from Olimpic)
19	MF	BIH	Enis Sadiković (free)
32	DF	BIH	Asim Škaljić (free)
1	GK	BIH	Adnan Hadžić (from Zrinjski)
27	GK	CRO	Filip Lončarić (free)
—	MF	BIH	Anel Alibašić (from Bosna Kalesija)

Out: Note: Flags indicate national team as defined under FIFA eligibility rules; some limited exceptions apply. Players may hold more than one non-FIFA nationality.

No.	Pos.	Nation	Player
26	MF	JPN	Eishun Yoshida (to (Germany) TSV Ottersberg)
18	DF	BIH	Josip Ćutuk (released)
7	MF	BIH	Sulejman Smajić (released)
6	DF	BIH	Jadranko Bogičević (to (Israel) Ironi Nir Ramat HaSharon)
30	GK	CRO	Marijan Antolović (loan return to (Poland) Legia Warsaw)
19	DF	BIH	Velibor Vasilić (to (Germany) TSV Hartberg)
22	GK	BIH	Semir Bukvić (to Travnik)
26	FW	BIH	Aleksandar Nikolić (to Mladost Velika Obarska)
14	FW	BIH	Mirsad Ramić (on loan to Travnik)
29	FW	BIH	Šaban Pehilj (released)

=== Zrinjski ===
In: Note: Flags indicate national team as defined under FIFA eligibility rules; some limited exceptions apply. Players may hold more than one non-FIFA nationality.

No.	Pos.	Nation	Player
—	MF	BIH	Srđan Savić (from Zvijezda Gradačac)
—	DF	BIH	Zoran Brković (from Čelik Zenica)
—	GK	BIH	Ratko Dujković (from Slavija)
—	MF	BIH	Vedran Kantar (from Borac Banja Luka)
—	DF	CRO	Damir Rašić (from (Croatia) Split)
—	FW	SRB	Igor Aničić (free)

Out: Note: Flags indicate national team as defined under FIFA eligibility rules; some limited exceptions apply. Players may hold more than one non-FIFA nationality.

No.	Pos.	Nation	Player
1	GK	BIH	Adnan Hadžić (to Željezničar)
20	MF	SRB	Igor Žuržinov (released)
3	DF	BIH	Josip Sesar (released)

=== Zvijezda Gradačac ===
In: Note: Flags indicate national team as defined under FIFA eligibility rules; some limited exceptions apply. Players may hold more than one non-FIFA nationality.

No.	Pos.	Nation	Player
—	DF	SRB	Borko Novaković (from Leotar)
—	MF	BIH	Dušan Bijelić (from Zvijezda Gradačac U19)
—	FW	BIH	Samir Isanović (from Zvijezda Gradačac U19)
—	MF	SRB	Dejan Janković (from Leotar)
—	DF	BIH	Gradimir Crnogorac (free)
—	DF	BIH	Elmir Kuduzović (free)
—	FW	BIH	Almir Šmigalović (free)
—	DF	BIH	Ajdin Maksumić (free, last with GOŠK)
—	MF	SRB	Jovan Radivojević (free, last with (Serbia) Banat Zrenjanin)

Out: Note: Flags indicate national team as defined under FIFA eligibility rules; some limited exceptions apply. Players may hold more than one non-FIFA nationality.

No.	Pos.	Nation	Player
20	FW	BIH	Mirza Džafić (released)
6	MF	MKD	Perica Stančeski (released)
19	MF	BIH	Almir Halilović (released)
13	DF	BIH	Nebojša Šodić (released)
8	FW	SRB	Slobodan Milanović (released)
21	MF	BIH	Srđan Savić (to Zrinjski)
10	DF	BIH	Senad Husić (to (Hungary) DVTK)
—	DF	BIH	Saša Mus (to (Hong Kong) -)

== First League of the Republika Srpska ==
=== Borac Šamac ===
In: Note: Flags indicate national team as defined under FIFA eligibility rules; some limited exceptions apply. Players may hold more than one non-FIFA nationality.

No.	Pos.	Nation	Player
—	DF	BIH	Vlado Koprivica (free, last with Modriča Maxima)
—	DF	BIH	Dragan Đaković (free, last with Modriča Maxima)

Out: Note: Flags indicate national team as defined under FIFA eligibility rules; some limited exceptions apply. Players may hold more than one non-FIFA nationality.

No.	Pos.	Nation	Player
10	FW	BIH	Mirza Hasanović (to Radnik Bijeljina)
—	DF	BIH	Igor Susaković (to Tekstilac)

=== Drina HE ===
In: Note: Flags indicate national team as defined under FIFA eligibility rules; some limited exceptions apply. Players may hold more than one non-FIFA nationality.

No.	Pos.	Nation	Player

Out: Note: Flags indicate national team as defined under FIFA eligibility rules; some limited exceptions apply. Players may hold more than one non-FIFA nationality.

No.	Pos.	Nation	Player
—	DF	BIH	Nebojša Sekulović (released)

=== Drina Zvornik ===
In: Note: Flags indicate national team as defined under FIFA eligibility rules; some limited exceptions apply. Players may hold more than one non-FIFA nationality.

No.	Pos.	Nation	Player

Out: Note: Flags indicate national team as defined under FIFA eligibility rules; some limited exceptions apply. Players may hold more than one non-FIFA nationality.

No.	Pos.	Nation	Player

=== Kozara ===
In: Note: Flags indicate national team as defined under FIFA eligibility rules; some limited exceptions apply. Players may hold more than one non-FIFA nationality.

No.	Pos.	Nation	Player
23	FW	BIH	Ozren Perić (from (Czech Republic) Slavia Orlová-Lutyně)
18	DF	BIH	Miodrag Gigović (free)
14	FW	BIH	Miloš Srndović (free)
2	DF	BIH	Konstantin Perić (from (Hungary) -)
—	MF	BIH	Srđan Berić (from Jedinstvo Žeravica)

Out: Note: Flags indicate national team as defined under FIFA eligibility rules; some limited exceptions apply. Players may hold more than one non-FIFA nationality.

No.	Pos.	Nation	Player
9	FW	BIH	Aleksandar Malbašić (released)
17	DF	BIH	Darko Medić (released)
22	DF	BIH	Srđan Stojnić (released)
16	MF	BIH	Nemanja Vidović (released)
5	DF	BIH	Borislav Vulić (released)

=== Mladost Gacko ===
In: Note: Flags indicate national team as defined under FIFA eligibility rules; some limited exceptions apply. Players may hold more than one non-FIFA nationality.

No.	Pos.	Nation	Player

Out: Note: Flags indicate national team as defined under FIFA eligibility rules; some limited exceptions apply. Players may hold more than one non-FIFA nationality.

No.	Pos.	Nation	Player

=== Modriča ===
In: Note: Flags indicate national team as defined under FIFA eligibility rules; some limited exceptions apply. Players may hold more than one non-FIFA nationality.

No.	Pos.	Nation	Player
—	GK	BIH	Darko Baić (from Sloga Doboj)
—	DF	BIH	Mihajlo Šipovac (from Borac Banja Luka U19)
—	MF	BIH	Ljubiša Petrović (from Željezničar Doboj)
—	FW	BIH	Spasoje Savkić (free)
—	DF	BIH	Tihomir Đokić (free)
—	MF	BIH	Danijel Karamanović (free)

Out: Note: Flags indicate national team as defined under FIFA eligibility rules; some limited exceptions apply. Players may hold more than one non-FIFA nationality.

No.	Pos.	Nation	Player
—	FW	MNE	Nemanja Asanović (to (Serbia) OFK Beograd)
—	MF	BIH	Aleksandar Milaković (released)
—	DF	BIH	Vlado Koprivica (released)
—	DF	BIH	Dragan Đaković (released)
—	MF	BIH	Radoslav Prljeta (released)
—	MF	BIH	Nebojša Prljeta (released)
—	FW	BIH	Mićo Kuzmanović (rto (Croatia) Dinamo Zagreb)
12	GK	BIH	Dušan Milojević (released)
—	MF	BIH	Njegoš Despotović (released)
—	DF	BIH	Darko Rogić (to (Czech Republic) -)
—	MF	MKD	Darko Alekovski (to (North Macedonia) Bregalnica Štip)
—	MF	BIH	Mirnes Došlić (to Kraijna Cazin)

=== Napredak Donji Šepak ===
In: Note: Flags indicate national team as defined under FIFA eligibility rules; some limited exceptions apply. Players may hold more than one non-FIFA nationality.

No.	Pos.	Nation	Player
—	MF	SRB	Nikola Milutinović (from (Serbia) Loznica)
—	DF	SRB	Darko Đukanović (from (Serbia) Loznica)
—	FW	SRB	Darko Perić (from (Serbia) Loznica)
—	MF	BIH	Slobodan Erić (from Drina Zvornik)
—	MF	BIH	Ljubiša Jovanović (from Jedinstvo Brodac)
—	GK	BIH	Mirko Antonić (from (Serbia) Antimon Zajača)
—	FW	BIH	Vladan Maksimović (from (Russia) -)

Out: Note: Flags indicate national team as defined under FIFA eligibility rules; some limited exceptions apply. Players may hold more than one non-FIFA nationality.

No.	Pos.	Nation	Player
—	GK	BIH	Branislav Ružić (to Slavija)
—	FW	BIH	Zoran Novaković (released)
—	MF	BIH	Vedran Milošević (released)
—	DF	BIH	Željko Bogićević (released)
—	FW	BIH	Boško Lazić (released)

=== Podrinje ===
In: Note: Flags indicate national team as defined under FIFA eligibility rules; some limited exceptions apply. Players may hold more than one non-FIFA nationality.

No.	Pos.	Nation	Player

Out: Note: Flags indicate national team as defined under FIFA eligibility rules; some limited exceptions apply. Players may hold more than one non-FIFA nationality.

No.	Pos.	Nation	Player
7	FW	BIH	Dejan Vučić (to Radnik Bijeljina)

=== Rudar Ugljevik ===
In: Note: Flags indicate national team as defined under FIFA eligibility rules; some limited exceptions apply. Players may hold more than one non-FIFA nationality.

No.	Pos.	Nation	Player

Out: Note: Flags indicate national team as defined under FIFA eligibility rules; some limited exceptions apply. Players may hold more than one non-FIFA nationality.

No.	Pos.	Nation	Player
—	FW	BIH	Milivoje Lazić (to Radnik)

=== Sloboda Mrkonjić Grad ===
In: Note: Flags indicate national team as defined under FIFA eligibility rules; some limited exceptions apply. Players may hold more than one non-FIFA nationality.

No.	Pos.	Nation	Player
—	DF	BIH	Darko Medić (free, last with Kozara)
—	GK	BIH	Nikola Đurić (free)
—	FW	BIH	Vladimir Karalić (free)

Out: Note: Flags indicate national team as defined under FIFA eligibility rules; some limited exceptions apply. Players may hold more than one non-FIFA nationality.

No.	Pos.	Nation	Player
21	FW	BIH	Milan Šakić (loan return to Borac Banja Luka)
12	GK	BIH	Marko Reljić (released)
22	MF	BIH	Đorđe Inđić (to Naprijed (BL))

=== Sloboda Novi Grad ===
In: Note: Flags indicate national team as defined under FIFA eligibility rules; some limited exceptions apply. Players may hold more than one non-FIFA nationality.

No.	Pos.	Nation	Player
—	DF	BIH	Stefan Štrbac (from Rudar Prijedor U19)
—	MF	BIH	Danijel Bujić (from Rudar Prijedor U19)
—	FW	BIH	Zoran Popović (free)
—	GK	BIH	Andrej Svjetlica (from Plamen)
—	FW	BIH	Boban Zdjelar (from Radnik Urije)

Out: Note: Flags indicate national team as defined under FIFA eligibility rules; some limited exceptions apply. Players may hold more than one non-FIFA nationality.

No.	Pos.	Nation	Player
—	DF	BIH	Nemanja Pekija (to Rudar Prijedor)
—	MF	BIH	Mladen Zgonjanin (to (Serbia) Proleter Novi Sad)
—	FW	BIH	Nemanja Vejnović (to (Germany) -)
—	MF	BIH	Mario Desnica (to Radnik Bijeljina)
—	GK	BIH	Slobodan Majkić (to (Sweden) -)

=== Sloga Doboj ===
In: Note: Flags indicate national team as defined under FIFA eligibility rules; some limited exceptions apply. Players may hold more than one non-FIFA nationality.

No.	Pos.	Nation	Player
—	DF	DOM	Eduardo Acevedo (free, last with Rudar Prijedor)

Out: Note: Flags indicate national team as defined under FIFA eligibility rules; some limited exceptions apply. Players may hold more than one non-FIFA nationality.

No.	Pos.	Nation	Player
—	GK	BIH	Darko Baić (to Modriča Maxima)
—	MF	BIH	Miloš Dujković (to (Montenegro) Zeta)

=== Sutjeska Foča ===
In: Note: Flags indicate national team as defined under FIFA eligibility rules; some limited exceptions apply. Players may hold more than one non-FIFA nationality.

No.	Pos.	Nation	Player

Out: Note: Flags indicate national team as defined under FIFA eligibility rules; some limited exceptions apply. Players may hold more than one non-FIFA nationality.

No.	Pos.	Nation	Player
—	MF	BIH	Mirko Tica (to Rudar Prijedor)
—	DF	BIH	Darko Mitrović (to Slavija)
—	GK	BIH	Darjan Matović (to (Serbia) Javor)

== First League of the Federation of Bosnia and Herzegovina ==
=== Branitelj ===
In: Note: Flags indicate national team as defined under FIFA eligibility rules; some limited exceptions apply. Players may hold more than one non-FIFA nationality.

No.	Pos.	Nation	Player

Out: Note: Flags indicate national team as defined under FIFA eligibility rules; some limited exceptions apply. Players may hold more than one non-FIFA nationality.

No.	Pos.	Nation	Player

=== Bratstvo ===
In: Note: Flags indicate national team as defined under FIFA eligibility rules; some limited exceptions apply. Players may hold more than one non-FIFA nationality.

No.	Pos.	Nation	Player

Out: Note: Flags indicate national team as defined under FIFA eligibility rules; some limited exceptions apply. Players may hold more than one non-FIFA nationality.

No.	Pos.	Nation	Player
11	MF	BIH	Samir Efendić (to Sloboda Tuzla)
17	MF	BIH	Jasmin Mujkić (to Sloboda Tuzla)

=== Budućnost ===
In: Note: Flags indicate national team as defined under FIFA eligibility rules; some limited exceptions apply. Players may hold more than one non-FIFA nationality.

No.	Pos.	Nation	Player

Out: Note: Flags indicate national team as defined under FIFA eligibility rules; some limited exceptions apply. Players may hold more than one non-FIFA nationality.

No.	Pos.	Nation	Player
17	FW	BIH	Muhamed Mujić (to (Croatia) Pomorac Kostrena)
—	DF	BIH	Igor Sliško (end of career)
—	MF	BIH	Edis Kurtić (end of career)

=== Čapljina ===
In: Note: Flags indicate national team as defined under FIFA eligibility rules; some limited exceptions apply. Players may hold more than one non-FIFA nationality.

No.	Pos.	Nation	Player

Out: Note: Flags indicate national team as defined under FIFA eligibility rules; some limited exceptions apply. Players may hold more than one non-FIFA nationality.

No.	Pos.	Nation	Player

=== GOŠK ===
In: Note: Flags indicate national team as defined under FIFA eligibility rules; some limited exceptions apply. Players may hold more than one non-FIFA nationality.

No.	Pos.	Nation	Player

Out: Note: Flags indicate national team as defined under FIFA eligibility rules; some limited exceptions apply. Players may hold more than one non-FIFA nationality.

No.	Pos.	Nation	Player
18	FW	BIH	Sabahudin Jusufbašić (to Velež)
3	DF	BIH	Vedad Šabanović (to Slavija)
7	MF	BIH	Sinan Ramović (to Velež)
—	DF	BIH	Ajdin Maksumić (released, next signed Zvijezda Gradačac)

=== Gradina ===
In: Note: Flags indicate national team as defined under FIFA eligibility rules; some limited exceptions apply. Players may hold more than one non-FIFA nationality.

No.	Pos.	Nation	Player

Out: Note: Flags indicate national team as defined under FIFA eligibility rules; some limited exceptions apply. Players may hold more than one non-FIFA nationality.

No.	Pos.	Nation	Player
13	MF	BIH	Emir Selimović (to Radnik)

=== Igman ===
In: Note: Flags indicate national team as defined under FIFA eligibility rules; some limited exceptions apply. Players may hold more than one non-FIFA nationality.

No.	Pos.	Nation	Player
—	MF	BIH	Edin Pehlić (free)
—	DF	BIH	Armin Jazvin (from Goražde)

Out: Note: Flags indicate national team as defined under FIFA eligibility rules; some limited exceptions apply. Players may hold more than one non-FIFA nationality.

No.	Pos.	Nation	Player

=== Iskra ===
In: Note: Flags indicate national team as defined under FIFA eligibility rules; some limited exceptions apply. Players may hold more than one non-FIFA nationality.

No.	Pos.	Nation	Player

Out: Note: Flags indicate national team as defined under FIFA eligibility rules; some limited exceptions apply. Players may hold more than one non-FIFA nationality.

No.	Pos.	Nation	Player
11	MF	BIH	Haris Seferović (to Travnik)
—	FW	BIH	Dženan Haračić (to (Croatia) Slaven Belupo)

=== Jedinstvo ===
In: Note: Flags indicate national team as defined under FIFA eligibility rules; some limited exceptions apply. Players may hold more than one non-FIFA nationality.

No.	Pos.	Nation	Player
—	DF	BIH	Fadil Čizmić (free)
—	MF	BIH	Rijad Pljevljak (free)

Out: Note: Flags indicate national team as defined under FIFA eligibility rules; some limited exceptions apply. Players may hold more than one non-FIFA nationality.

No.	Pos.	Nation	Player
—	DF	BIH	Irman Hodžić (to Sloboda Tuzla)

=== Mladost ===
In: Note: Flags indicate national team as defined under FIFA eligibility rules; some limited exceptions apply. Players may hold more than one non-FIFA nationality.

No.	Pos.	Nation	Player

Out: Note: Flags indicate national team as defined under FIFA eligibility rules; some limited exceptions apply. Players may hold more than one non-FIFA nationality.

No.	Pos.	Nation	Player

=== Orašje ===
In: Note: Flags indicate national team as defined under FIFA eligibility rules; some limited exceptions apply. Players may hold more than one non-FIFA nationality.

No.	Pos.	Nation	Player

Out: Note: Flags indicate national team as defined under FIFA eligibility rules; some limited exceptions apply. Players may hold more than one non-FIFA nationality.

No.	Pos.	Nation	Player

=== Podgrmeč ===
In: Note: Flags indicate national team as defined under FIFA eligibility rules; some limited exceptions apply. Players may hold more than one non-FIFA nationality.

No.	Pos.	Nation	Player

Out: Note: Flags indicate national team as defined under FIFA eligibility rules; some limited exceptions apply. Players may hold more than one non-FIFA nationality.

No.	Pos.	Nation	Player

=== Radnički ===
In: Note: Flags indicate national team as defined under FIFA eligibility rules; some limited exceptions apply. Players may hold more than one non-FIFA nationality.

No.	Pos.	Nation	Player

Out: Note: Flags indicate national team as defined under FIFA eligibility rules; some limited exceptions apply. Players may hold more than one non-FIFA nationality.

No.	Pos.	Nation	Player
17	MF	BIH	Semir Slomić (released)
12	GK	BIH	Emir Hodžić (to Sloboda Tuzla)

=== Rudar ===
In: Note: Flags indicate national team as defined under FIFA eligibility rules; some limited exceptions apply. Players may hold more than one non-FIFA nationality.

No.	Pos.	Nation	Player

Out: Note: Flags indicate national team as defined under FIFA eligibility rules; some limited exceptions apply. Players may hold more than one non-FIFA nationality.

No.	Pos.	Nation	Player

=== Sloboda ===
In: Note: Flags indicate national team as defined under FIFA eligibility rules; some limited exceptions apply. Players may hold more than one non-FIFA nationality.

No.	Pos.	Nation	Player
—	GK	BIH	Emir Hodžić (from Radnički Lukavac)
—	MF	BIH	Samir Efendić (from Bratstvo Gračanica)
—	FW	BIH	Jasmin Mujkić (from Bratstvo Gračanica)
—	DF	BIH	Esmir Hasanović (from Orašje)
—	FW	BIH	Mirnes Smajlović (from (Iceland) -)
—	FW	BIH	Miloš Galin (from (Greece) Kalamata)
—	DF	BIH	Esmir Jusić (from Zvijezda Gradačac)
—	DF	BIH	Irman Hodžić (from Jedinstvo Bihać)

Out: Note: Flags indicate national team as defined under FIFA eligibility rules; some limited exceptions apply. Players may hold more than one non-FIFA nationality.

No.	Pos.	Nation	Player
4	DF	BIH	Gradimir Crnogorac (released)
12	GK	BIH	Tino Divković (released)
15	DF	BIH	Renato Gojković (to Čelik Zenica)
9	FW	BIH	Haris Ribić (to Čelik Zenica)
13	MF	BIH	Šerif Hasić (released)

== See also ==
- Premier League of Bosnia and Herzegovina
- First League of the Republika Srpska
- First League of the Federation of Bosnia and Herzegovina
- 2013–14 Premier League of Bosnia and Herzegovina
- 2013–14 First League of the Republika Srpska
- 2013–14 First League of the Federation of Bosnia and Herzegovina
