= Huseinbašić =

Huseinbašić is a Bosnian surname. Notable people with the surname include:

- Denis Huseinbašić (born 2001), Bosnian footballer
- Ermin Huseinbašić (born 1993), Bosnian footballer
