= Miloš Marković =

Miloš Marković may refer to:

- Miloš Marković (footballer born 1986), Serbian football player
- Miloš Marković (footballer born 1992), Montenegrin football player
- Miloš Marković (water polo) (1947–2010), Serbian water polo player
- Miloš Marković (basketball), Serbian basketball player, played for KK Partizan in 2004-05
