= Komazec =

Komazec (Комазец) is a Serbian surname. Notable people with the name include:

- Arijan Komazec (born 1970), Croatian basketball player
- Nikola Komazec (born 1987), Serbian football player
