= 2013–14 Premier League of Bosnia and Herzegovina =

Premijer liga
- Season: 2013–14
- Champions: Zrinjski; 3rd Premier League title 3rd Bosnian title
- Relegated: Rudar (P); Leotar
- Champions League: Zrinjski
- Europa League: Široki Brijeg; Sarajevo; Željezničar
- Matches: 240
- Goals: 583 (2.43 per match)
- Top goalscorer: Wagner Lago (18 goals)
- Biggest home win: Olimpic 6–0 Slavija; Široki Brijeg 6-0; Mladost (VO)
- Biggest away win: Mladost (VO) 0–4 Željezničar; Leotar 0-4 Velež
- Highest scoring: 7 goals Slavija 2-5 Radnik; Velež 5-2 Radnik
- Longest winning run: 5 matches Željezničar
- Longest unbeaten run: 11 matches Željezničar
- Longest winless run: 8 matches Rudar (P)
- Longest losing run: 7 matches Leotar
- Highest attendance: 12,000; Sarajevo 0:0 Željezničar
- Lowest attendance: 150
- Total attendance: 170,000
- Average attendance: 1,214

The 2013–14 Premier League of Bosnia and Herzegovina (known as BH Telecom Premier League for sponsorship reasons) was the fourteenth season of the Premier League of Bosnia and Herzegovina, the highest football league of Bosnia and Herzegovina, since its original establishment in 2000 and twelfth as a unified country-wide league. The season began on 27 July 2013 and ended on 10 May 2014, with a winter break between 2 December 2013 and 1 March 2014.

Zrinjski were crowned national champions for the third time, while defending champions Željezničar ended up in fourth place.

Leotar and Rudar Prijedor were relegated at the end of the season.

== Teams ==
A total of 16 teams contested the league, including 14 sides from the 2012–13 season and two promoted from each of the second-level leagues, the 2012–13 First League of the Federation of Bosnia and Herzegovina and the 2012–13 First League of the Republika Srpska.

Gradina was constantly in last place already since round 5 and was officially relegated 5 rounds before the season finished, ending their debut season rather unsuccessfully, earning only 9 points, which is the third lowest since the league was renamed to the Premier League of Bosnia and Herzegovina in 2000. The relegation of GOŠK Gabela was confirmed only after the last round finished, ending their two-year run in the Premier League.

The relegated teams were replaced by the champions of the two second–level leagues, Vitez from the First League of the Federation of Bosnia and Herzegovina and Mladost Velika Obarska from the First League of the Republika Srpska. Both teams made their debut in the Premier League.

=== Stadiums and locations ===
Location of clubs in 2013–14 Premijer Liga

Team	Location	Stadium	Capacity
Borac	Banja Luka	Gradski Stadion, Banja Luka	13,730
Čelik	Zenica	Bilino Polje	15,292
Leotar	Trebinje	Police	8,550
Mladost	Velika Obarska	Gradski Stadion^{1}	1,000
Olimpic	Sarajevo	Otoka	3,000
Radnik	Bijeljina	Gradski Stadion	6,000
Rudar	Prijedor	Gradski Stadion	5,000
Sarajevo	Sarajevo	Asim Ferhatović Hase	35,630
Slavija	Istočno Sarajevo	SRC Slavija	6,000
Široki Brijeg	Široki Brijeg	Pecara	5,628
Travnik	Travnik	Pirota	3,200
Velež	Mostar	Vrapčići	5,294
Vitez	Vitez	Gradski Stadion^{2}	3,000
Zrinjski	Mostar	Bijeli Brijeg	20,000
Zvijezda	Gradačac	Banja Ilidža	5,000
Željezničar	Sarajevo	Grbavica	16,100

^{1} Mladost played their home games on 7,5 kilometer away Gradski stadion, Bijeljina because their Gradski stadion, Velika Obarska doesn't fulfill criteria for Premier League of Bosnia and Herzegovina.
^{2} Vitez played their home games on 16,5 kilometer away Kamberović polje, Zenica due to their stadium not yet fulfilling criteria for Premier League of Bosnia and Herzegovina. They played at Gradski stadion, Vitez at the beginning of October.

=== Personnel and kits ===
Note: Flags indicate national team as has been defined under FIFA eligibility rules. Players may hold more than one non-FIFA nationality.

Team	Manager	Captain	Kit manufacturer	Shirt Sponsor
Borac	(Bosnia and Herzegovina) Dragan Jović	(Bosnia and Herzegovina) Boris Raspudić	NAAI	m:tel
Čelik	(Bosnia and Herzegovina) Nijaz Hukić	(Bosnia and Herzegovina) Kenan Horić	Joma	RM-LH
Leotar	(Bosnia and Herzegovina) Dragan Spaić	(Bosnia and Herzegovina) (Serbia) Zdravko Šaraba	Kappa	Elnos
Mladost	(Serbia) Dušan Jevrić	?	uhlsport/Nike	—
Olimpic	(Bosnia and Herzegovina) Faik Kolar	(Bosnia and Herzegovina) Veldin Muharemović	NAAI	Europlakat
Radnik	(Bosnia and Herzegovina) Srđan Bajić	?	Bull	—
Rudar	(Bosnia and Herzegovina) Boris Gavran	(Bosnia and Herzegovina) Goran Kotaran	NAAI	Optima / ArcelorMittal
Sarajevo	(Bosnia and Herzegovina) Dženan Uščuplić	(Bosnia and Herzegovina) Amer Dupovac	Haad	Visit Malaysia
Slavija	(Serbia) Slaviša Božičić	?	Joma	Nova Banka
Široki Brijeg	(Bosnia and Herzegovina) (Croatia) Slaven Musa	(Bosnia and Herzegovina) (Croatia) Dalibor Šilić	Jako	Mepas
Travnik	(Bosnia and Herzegovina) Husnija Arapović	?	NAAI	ADK
Velež	(Bosnia and Herzegovina) Nedim Jusufbegović	?	Haad	HEPOK Mostar
Vitez	(Croatia) Ante Miše	(Bosnia and Herzegovina) Dario Pranjković	Joma	—
Zrinjski	(Croatia) Branko Karačić	(Bosnia and Herzegovina) (Croatia) Igor Melher	Zeus	HT-ERONET
Zvijezda	(Bosnia and Herzegovina) Denis Taletović	(Bosnia and Herzegovina) Jasmin Moranjkić	Bull	—
Željezničar	(Bosnia and Herzegovina) Hajrudin Đurbuzović	(Bosnia and Herzegovina) Muamer Svraka	Joma	-

=== Managerial changes ===
Team	Outgoing manager	Manner of departure	Date of vacancy	Position in table	Replaced by	Date of appointment
Leotar	(Bosnia and Herzegovina) Vladimir Gaćinović	Resigned	30 May 2013	Preseason	(Bosnia and Herzegovina) Dragan Spaić	9 July 2013
Rudar	(Bosnia and Herzegovina) Vlado Čapljić	Resigned	30 May 2013	Preseason	(Bosnia and Herzegovina) Slobodan Starčević	11 June 2013
Borac	(Bosnia and Herzegovina) Slobodan Starčević	Resigned	6 June 2013	Preseason	(Bosnia and Herzegovina) Dragan Jović	19 June 2013
Zvijezda	(Bosnia and Herzegovina) Milomir Odović	Mutual agreement	7 June 2013	Preseason	(Bosnia and Herzegovina) Vladimir Gaćinović	7 June 2013
Travnik	(Bosnia and Herzegovina) Nermin Bašić	Resigned	19 June 2013	Preseason	(Bosnia and Herzegovina) Edin Prljača	19 June 2013
Slavija	(Bosnia and Herzegovina) Milomir Šešlija	Resigned	11 July 2013	Preseason	(Bosnia and Herzegovina) Dragan Radović	11 July 2013
Željezničar	(Bosnia and Herzegovina) Amar Osim	Mutual agreement	26 July 2013	Preseason	(Bosnia and Herzegovina) Hajrudin Đurbuzović (Caretaker)	26 July 2013
Zvijezda	(Bosnia and Herzegovina) Vladimir Gaćinović	Resigned	19 August 2013	16	(Bosnia and Herzegovina) Nermin Huseinbašić (Caretaker)	28 August 2013
Travnik	(Bosnia and Herzegovina) Edin Prljača	Resigned	28 August 2013	14	(Bosnia and Herzegovina) Husnija Arapović	6 September 2013
Mladost	(Bosnia and Herzegovina) Mile Milanović	Sacked	4 September 2013	12	(Serbia) Dušan Jevrić	4 September 2013
Rudar	(Bosnia and Herzegovina) Slobodan Starčević	Resigned	17 September 2013	16	(Bosnia and Herzegovina) Boris Gavran	18 September 2013
Velež	(Bosnia and Herzegovina) Ibro Rahimić	Sacked	27 September 2013	7	(Bosnia and Herzegovina) Nedim Jusufbegović	3 October 2013
Olimpic	(Bosnia and Herzegovina) Nedim Jusufbegović	Signed by Velež	3 October 2013	5	(Bosnia and Herzegovina) Faik Kolar	3 October 2013
Zvijezda	(Bosnia and Herzegovina) Nermin Huseinbašić	Sacked	10 October 2013	10	(Bosnia and Herzegovina) Denis Taletović	10 October 2013
Čelik	(Bosnia and Herzegovina) Vlado Jagodić	Mutual agreement	30 October 2013	11	(Bosnia and Herzegovina) Nizah Hukić (Caretaker)	30 October 2013
Slavija	(Bosnia and Herzegovina) Dragan Radović	Sacked	31 October 2013	10	(Bosnia and Herzegovina) Aleksandar Simić (Caretaker)	31 October 2013
Vitez	(Serbia) Valentin Plavčić	Mutual agreement	31 October 2013	15	(Croatia) Ante Miše	2 November 2013
Slavija	(Bosnia and Herzegovina) Aleksandar Simić (Caretaker)	Mutual agreement	13 November 2013	11	(Serbia) Slaviša Božičić	13 November 2013
Sarajevo	(Bosnia and Herzegovina) Husref Musemić	Sacked	1 December 2013	2	(Croatia) Robert Jarni	1 December 2013

== League table ==
Pos	Team	Pld	W	D	L	GF	GA	GD	Pts	Qualification or relegation
1	Zrinjski (C)	30	18	7	5	56	21	+35	61	Qualification to Champions League second qualifying round
2	Široki Brijeg	30	17	8	5	66	23	+43	59	Qualification to Europa League first qualifying round
3	Sarajevo	30	16	10	4	45	21	+24	58	Qualification to Europa League second qualifying round (Note: Sarajevo qualified for 2014–15 UEFA Europa League second qualifying round by winning the 2013–14 Bosnia and Herzegovina Football Cup.)
4	Željezničar	30	16	9	5	51	29	+22	57	Qualification to Europa League first qualifying round
5	Velež	30	15	9	6	42	23	+19	54	
6	Borac Banja Luka	30	13	6	11	39	32	+7	45	
7	Čelik	30	10	13	7	35	32	+3	43	
8	Olimpic	30	10	11	9	39	30	+9	41	
9	Vitez	30	10	6	14	34	39	−5	36	
10	Radnik	30	10	6	14	34	50	−16	36	
11	Mladost Velika Obarska	30	8	9	13	24	38	−14	33	
12	Travnik	30	7	10	13	31	44	−13	31	
13	Slavija (Note: Slavija were deducted 3 points.)	30	9	7	14	27	43	−16	31	
14	Zvijezda	30	9	4	17	25	49	−24	31	
15	Rudar Prijedor (R)	30	5	12	13	24	39	−15	27	Relegation to Prva Liga RS
16	Leotar (R)	30	2	3	25	11	70	−59	9	Relegation to Prva Liga RS

Source: SportSport.ba (in Bosnian)
Rules for classification: 1st points; 2nd goal difference; 3rd goals scored
For deciding champions, qualification to UEFA Europa League and relegation: 1st points; 2nd head-to-head points; 3rd head-to-head goal difference; 4th head-to-head goals scored; 5th head-to-head away goals scored; 6th goal difference; 7th goals scored.
(C) Champions; (R) Relegated

=== Positions by round ===
Team ╲ Round	1	2	3	4	5	6	7	8	9	10	11	12	13	14	15	16	17	18	19	20	21	22	23	24	25	26	27	28	29	30
Borac Banja Luka	5	4	6	5	1	1	3	1	1	1	1	1	1	1	1	1	1	2	5	5	5	5	6	6	7	6	6			
Čelik	8	8	10	10	11	10	10	12	11	11	11	10	11	11	10	10	9	8	8	8	8	8	8	8	8	8	8			
Leotar	16	15	15	15	16	11	15	15	16	16	16	16	16	16	16	16	16	16	16	16	16	16	16	16	16	16	16	16	16	16
Mladost Velika Obarska	11	9	11	12	12	12	13	11	12	12	14	15	13	14	15	15	13	13	13	13	13	13	14	12	12	10	12			
Olimpic	1	2	4	2	4	7	4	6	6	5	4	4	5	4	5	4	6	6	6	6	6	6	5	5	5	7	7			
Radnik	6	5	5	4	5	9	9	7	8	6	5	7	8	9	11	8	10	9	10	9	11	11	11	10	10	11	9			
Rudar Prijedor	7	10	12	11	10	13	16	16	15	15	15	13	15	12	13	13	14	14	14	14	14	15	15	15	15	15	15			
Sarajevo	4	6	8	9	2	2	2	2	4	3	3	2	2	2	2	2	2	5	2	4	4	4	3	4	4	4	4			
Slavija	13	11	9	7	8	5	6	8	9	10	9	9	10	10	9	11	12	11	12	10	12	12	12	13	11	12	11			
Široki Brijeg	12	3	2	3	7	4	7	4	3	4	6	8	6	5	6	5	4	3	3	2	2	2	1	1	3	3	3			
Travnik	9	14	13	13	14	15	12	13	13	13	13	14	12	13	14	14	15	15	15	15	15	14	13	14	14	14	14			
Velež	2	7	3	8	9	8	5	5	7	8	8	6	7	7	7	7	7	7	7	7	7	7	7	7	6	5	5			
Vitez	10	12	14	14	15	16	14	14	14	14	12	12	14	15	12	12	11	12	11	12	10	10	9	9	9	9	10			
Zrinjski	14	13	7	6	6	3	1	3	2	2	2	3	3	3	3	6	5	4	4	3	3	3	2	2	1	1	1			
Zvijezda	15	16	16	16	13	14	11	10	10	9	10	11	9	8	8	9	8	10	9	11	9	9	10	11	13	13	13			
Željezničar	3	1	1	1	3	6	8	9	5	7	7	5	4	6	4	3	3	1	1	1	1	1	4	3	2	2	2			

Leader
2013–14 UEFA Europa League First qualifying round
Relegation to 2014–15 Prva Liga FBiH or 2014–15 Prva Liga RS

Source: SportSport.ba

== Results ==
Home \ Away	BOR	ČEL	LEO	MVO	OLI	RAD	RPR	SAR	SLA	ŠB	TRA	VEL	VIT	ZRI	ZVI	ŽEL
Borac Banja Luka		0–0	1–0	0–1	0–1	2–0	3–0	0–0	2–0	2–2	2–3	0–0	1–0	2–0	1–2	2–1
Čelik	1–1		3–0	4–1	2–2	2–0	4–1	1–0	2–0	0–2	1–1	0–0	0–0	3–2	3–1	2–2
Leotar	0–5	1–2		1–1	0–2	1–2	0–1	1–2	2–0	0–4	0–2	0–4	0–0	0–2	1–0	0–3
Mladost Velika Obarska	2–3	0–0	2–0		1–0	0–1	2–0	0–2	2–0	0–0	0–0	1–1	2–0	0–2	2–0	0–4
Olimpic	1–1	0–0	4–0	2–1		3–0	1–0	0–2	6–0	0–0	1–1	0–1	1–0	1–2	2–3	1–4
Radnik	1–2	0–0	3–0	0–2	2–1		2–0	1–2	2–0	1–1	1–0	0–2	2–1	1–3	1–1	0–0
Rudar Prijedor	1–2	1–1	2–2	0–0	0–1	1–1		0–0	0–1	0–0	1–0	2–1	2–1	0–2	3–0	1–1
Sarajevo	0–3	3–0	3–0	0–0	1–1	3–2	3–2		3–0	1–2	3–1	2–1	4–0	1–0	3–0	0–0
Slavija	2–0	0–0	3–0	3–0	2–0	2–5	1–1	0–0		4–2	1–0	0–2	1–0	0–2	3–1	1–1
Široki Brijeg	3–0	2–0	3–0	6–0	0–0	4–0	3–3	2–0	1–0		5–1	3–0	2–0	1–1	6–0	3–2
Travnik	1–2	2–0	1–0	1–1	2–2	2–2	2–0	2–3	1–1	1–0		0–0	1–1	1–1	3–1	1–2
Velež	3–0	0–2	3–0	0–0	1–1	5–2	1–0	0–0	2–1	0–3	1–0		1–0	1–0	1–1	4–2
Vitez	3–1	1–1	2–0	2–1	2–1	3–0	1–1	0–2	3–0	2–1	3–0	1–5		1–1	3–1	0–1
Zrinjski	2–1	4–0	2–0	2–0	1–1	5–0	0–0	1–1	2–0	3–2	5–1	0–0	2–0		3–0	2–1
Zvijezda	1–0	1–0	4–1	2–1	0–2	1–0	0–0	0–0	0–0	2–0	2–0	1–2	1–3	0–3		0–1
Željezničar	1–0	3–0	4–1	2–1	1–1	2–2	3–1	1–1	0–0	0–3	2–0	1–0	3–1	2–1	1–0	

Source: SportSport.ba
Legend: Blue = home team win; Yellow = draw; Red = away team win.

=== Clubs season-progress ===
Team ╲ Round	1	2	3	4	5	6	7	8	9	10	11	12	13	14	15	16	17	18	19	20	21	22	23	24	25	26	27	28	29	30
Borac Banja Luka	D	W	D	W	W	W	L	W	W	W	W	D	L	W	W	D	L	L	L											
Čelik	D	D	D	D	L	W	L	D	D	D	D	W	D	L	W	D	D	W	W											
Leotar	L	D	L	L	D	W	L	D	L	L	L	W	L	L	L	L	L	L	L											
Mladost Velika Obarska	D	D	D	L	L	D	D	W	L	D	L	L	W	L	L	L	W	L	W											
Olimpic	W	D	D	W	D	L	W	L	D	W	D	W	D	W	D	W	D	W	L											
Radnik	D	W	D	W	D	L	L	W	D	W	D	L	L	L	L	W	L	W	L											
Rudar Prijedor	D	D	L	D	D	L	L	L	W	L	L	W	L	W	L	L	L	D	D											
Sarajevo	W	D	L	W	W	W	D	D	L	W	D	W	W	D	W	D	W	L	W											
Slavija	L	D	W	W	D	W	D	L	L	L	W	L	D	L	W	L	L	D	D											
Široki Brijeg	D	W	W	D	L	W	L	W	D	D	L	D	W	W	D	W	W	W	D											
Travnik	D	L	D	L	D	L	W	D	D	D	D	L	W	L	L	L	L	L	D											
Velež	W	L	W	D	D	D	W	D	L	D	D	W	L	W	D	W	L	W	L											
Vitez	D	L	L	L	D	L	W	D	D	L	W	L	L	L	W	W	W	L	W											
Zrinjski	L	D	W	W	D	W	W	L	W	D	W	L	D	W	D	D	W	W	D											
Zvijezda	L	L	L	L	W	L	W	W	W	D	D	L	W	W	L	L	W	L	D											
Željezničar	W	W	W	L	D	L	D	L	W	D	D	W	W	D	W	W	W	W	W											

Updated to match(es) played on 5 August 2013. Source: SportSport.ba
W = Win; D = Draw; L = Lose

== Season statistics ==
=== Transfers ===
For the list of transfers involving Premier League clubs during 2013–14 season, please see: List of Bosnia and Herzegovina football transfers summer 2013 and List of Bosnia and Herzegovina football transfers winter 2013–14.

=== Top goalscorers ===
Rank	Player	Club	Goals
1	(Brazil) Wagner Santos Lago	Široki Brijeg	18
2	(Bosnia and Herzegovina) (Serbia) Joco Stokić	Borac Banja Luka	10
3	(Serbia) Nikola Komazec	Sarajevo	9
3	(Montenegro) Marko Obradović	Radnik	9
5	(Bosnia and Herzegovina) Armin Hodžić	Željezničar	8
5	(Bosnia and Herzegovina) Amer Bekić	Zrinjski	8
6	(Bosnia and Herzegovina) Krešimir Kordić	Široki Brijeg	7
6	(Bosnia and Herzegovina) (Croatia) Dino Ćorić	Široki Brijeg	7
6	(Bosnia and Herzegovina) Vernes Selimović	Željezničar	7
6	(Bosnia and Herzegovina) Ševko Okić	Velež	7
6	(Bosnia and Herzegovina) Alen Dedić	Čelik	7
6	(Bosnia and Herzegovina) (Serbia) Saša Kajkut	Čelik	7

* Italic highlights the former club, while bold the current one.

==== Hat-tricks ====
Player	For	Against	Result	Date
(Bosnia and Herzegovina) Armin Hodžić	Željezničar	Leotar	4–1	25 September 2013
(Bosnia and Herzegovina) Vedran Vidović	Vitez	Travnik	3–0	9 November 2013
(Bosnia and Herzegovina) Dino Ćorić	Široki Brijeg	Mladost	6–0	10 November 2013

=== Clean sheets ===
- Most clean sheets: 10
  - Sarajevo
- Fewest clean sheets: 2
  - Vitez and Rudar Prijedor

== Attendances ==
#	Club	Average
1	Željezničar	2,800
2	Sarajevo	2,687
3	Čelik	2,127
4	Borac	1,987
5	Zrinjski	1,760
6	Velež	1,183
7	Zvijezda	897
8	Travnik	792
9	Rudar	757
10	Široki	690
11	Vitez	670
12	Olimpik	617
13	Slavija	593
14	Mladost	473
15	Radnik	470
16	Leotar	279

== See also ==
- 2013–14 Bosnia and Herzegovina Football Cup
- Football Federation of Bosnia and Herzegovina
