= Germain Kouadio =

Ivorian footballer

Personal information
- Date of birth: 27 December 1992 (age 33)
- Place of birth: M'Bahiakro, Ivory Coast
- Height: 1.74 m (5 ft 9 in)
- Position: Left winger

Team information
- Current team: ASKO Kara

Youth career
- 2002–2009: Jeunesse Sportive de Bassam

Senior career*
Years	Team	Apps	(Gls)
2010–2014	Moossou		
2014–2016	Sarajevo	0	(0)
2015–2016	→ Travnik (loan)	14	(3)
2016	Travnik	14	(7)
2016–2017	Zrinjski Mostar	1	(0)
2017	České Budějovice	1	(0)
2017–2018	Čelik Zenica	9	(3)
2021–	ASKO Kara		
- * Club domestic league appearances and goals as of 5 November 2022

Germain Toupet Kouadio (born 27 December 1992) is an Ivorian professional footballer who plays as a left winger for Togolese Championnat National club ASKO Kara.

== Club career ==
=== Travnik ===
In February 2016, Kouadio signed for Bosnian club Travnik. After just five months he left the club.

=== Zrinjski Mostar ===
In July 2016, Kouadio signed for another Bosnian club Zrinjski Mostar. In February 2017, Kouadio left the club.

=== České Budějovice ===
One month after he left the Bosnia and Herzegovina, Kouadio signed for Czech club České Budějovice. Kouadio left the club in August.

=== Čelik Zenica ===
In August 2017, Kouadio went back to Bosnia and Herzegovina and signes a contract with Čelik Zenica. Kouadio left the club after one season.

=== ASKO Kara ===
After three years without club, Kouadio signed for Togolese club ASKO Kara.

== Career statistics ==
=== Club ===
As of match played 5 May 2018.

Appearances and goals by club, season and competition
Club	Season	League			Cup		Europe		Total	
Club	Season	League	Apps	Goals	Apps	Goals	Apps	Goals	Apps	Goals
Travnik	2015–16	Bosnian Premier League	26	9	2	1	–		28	10
Zrinjski Mostar	2016–17	Bosnian Premier League	1	0	2	0	–		3	0
České Budějovice	2016–17	Fortuna národní liga	1	0	0	0	–		1	0
Čelik Zenica	2017–18	Bosnian Premier League	9	3	1	1	–		10	4
Career total			37	12	5	2	–		42	14
