= Mario Tadejević =

Croatian footballer

Personal information
- Date of birth: 28 August 1989 (age 37)
- Place of birth: Rijeka, SFR Yugoslavia
- Height: 1.84 m (6 ft 0 in)
- Position: Left back

Team information
- Current team: Orijent
- Number: 28

Youth career
- 2001–2008: Rijeka

Senior career*
Years	Team	Apps	(Gls)
2007–2012	Rijeka	37	(2)
2010–2011	→ Pomorac (loan)	10	(0)
2012–2014	Sarajevo	46	(3)
2015	Pécs	4	(0)
2015–2016	Velež Mostar	7	(0)
2016	Krk	4	(0)
2016–2018	Fjölnir	61	(0)
2019–	Orijent	167	(17)
- * Club domestic league appearances and goals as of 17 June 2026

Mario Tadejević (born 28 August 1989) is a Croatian football defender who plays for Orijent in the Croatian Second Football League.

== Career ==
He started his professional career in 2007 with Rijeka in Croatia's Prva HNL and was with the club until 2012. This included a loan to Pomorac in Croatia's Druga HNL during one of the seasons. He later had a three-year spell in Iceland with Fjölnir.
