= Adriano Strack =

Brazilian footballer (born 1992)

Personal information
- Full name: Adriano Guerra Strack
- Date of birth: 15 February 1992 (age 34)
- Place of birth: Carazinho, Brazil
- Height: 1.80 m (5 ft 11 in)
- Position: Midfielder

Team information
- Current team: Ypiranga

Youth career
- 2002–2006: Juventude
- 2007: Grêmio
- 2008–2010: São José-PA

Senior career*
Years	Team	Apps	(Gls)
2010–2011	Juventude		
2011–2013	Chapecoense		
2013	Três Passos		
2014	Travnik	11	(4)
2015	Dugopolje	4	(0)
2015	Novi Pazar	1	(0)
2015	Segesta	2	(0)
2016	Mitra Kukar		
2016–	Ypiranga		
- * Club domestic league appearances and goals as of 18 October 2015

Adriano Guerra Strack (born 15 February 1992) is a Brazilian professional footballer who plays as a midfielder with Ypiranga.

== Career ==
Born in Carazinho, in the Brazilian state of Rio Grande do Sul, Adriano changed five Brazilian clubs, before he decided to go abroad. He played with the Grêmio youth team in 2007 and with Chapecoense in 2013. He joined NK Travnik in 2014. In nine appearances in the Premier League of Bosnia and Herzegovina, he scored five goals. Adriano helped save the club from relegation in 2013–14 in a match against FK Borac Banja Luka. When Adriano left the reserve bench at the start of interval, the score was 2–0 to FK Borac Banja Luka. Adriano scored 1 goal, his assist led to another goal; he was fouled that led to a third goal and the final score of 3–2. Adriano turned idol of Gerilla fans.

He had four caps for NK Dugopolje in the Croatian Second Football League, before he signed a three-year contract with Serbian SuperLiga club Novi Pazar in summer 2015. However, unhappy with being a substitute in the first games of the season, on 20 August 2015, he and FK Novi Pazar reached an agreement to terminate the contract. Thus Strack left Novi Pazar after playing only nine minutes as a substitute in a game against Partizan in the third round of the SuperLiga. However, Strack left after less than two months.

He signed in 2016 with Mitra Kukar in Indonesia Soccer Championship, and had good performances in a short time. He returned to Brazil in April and to score that did pele, 75 meters from the goal distance, a friendly match between the team of his Clube Atlético Carazinho against Ypiranga Futebol Clube (Erechim) that participates in the Brasileirão series C.

Adriano signed with Ypiranga Futebol Clube (Erechim) team until the end of this year.
