= Miloš Marković (footballer, born 1992) =

Montenegrin footballer

Personal information
- Date of birth: 28 April 1992 (age 34)
- Place of birth: Cetinje, SFR Yugoslavia
- Height: 1.89 m (6 ft 2 1/2 in)
- Position: Defensive midfielder

Team information
- Current team: Ibar

Youth career
- 2008–2009: Rad
- 2009–2010: Partizan
- 2011: Győri ETO

Senior career*
Years	Team	Apps	(Gls)
2011–2012	Győri ETO II	3	(0)
2012–2013	Skënderbeu Korçë	0	(0)
2013–2014	Igalo	15	(0)
2014	Rudar Pljevlja	0	(0)
2014–2015	Leotar	10	(1)
2015	Iskra		
2016–2017	Mladost Lješkopolje		
2017	Ibar	6	(0)
2018–2019	Polet Stars		
2019	Drezga	5	(0)
2020-	Ibar		
- * Club domestic league appearances and goals as of 17:21, 14 December 2019 (UTC)

Miloš Marković (Cyrillic: Милош Марковић, born 28 April 1992) is a Montenegrin football midfielder who plays for FK Ibar.
