= Irfan Vusljanin =

Serbian footballer

Personal information
- Full name: Irfan Vusljanin
- Date of birth: 7 January 1986 (age 40)
- Place of birth: Novi Pazar, SR Serbia, SFR Yugoslavia
- Height: 1.77 m (5 ft 10 in)
- Position: Winger

Senior career*
Years	Team	Apps	(Gls)
2003–2005	Novi Pazar	26	(2)
2005–2008	OFK Beograd	14	(1)
2006	→ Spartak Subotica (loan)	2	(0)
2006	→ Novi Pazar (loan)	19	(1)
2007	→ Borac Čačak (loan)	20	(0)
2008	→ Sevojno (loan)	17	(2)
2008–2011	Jagodina	43	(6)
2011–2013	Novi Pazar	44	(7)
2013	Borac Čačak	11	(0)
2013–2014	Sarajevo	17	(1)
2014–2015	Radnički Kragujevac	18	(0)
2015–2018	Novi Pazar	46	(1)
2018	Belasica	16	(2)
2019	Novi Pazar	34	(7)
2020	Radnički Pirot	3	(0)
2020	Sloboda Užice		
2021–2022	Tutin		
2023	Jošanica		
Total		330	(30)
- * Club domestic league appearances and goals

Irfan Vusljanin (Serbian Cyrillic: Ирфан Вусљанин; born 7 January 1986) is a Serbian retired footballer who played as a midfielder.

== Career ==
He started playing with his home town club FK Novi Pazar. In summer 2005 he moved to play with top league club OFK Beograd where he will stay until 2008, mostly playing as a loaned player with other clubs. His only matches with OFK were in his first 2005-06 season there, but also one match in the last 2007-08 season. During this period he was loaned for half season with Spartak Subotica, another half season with his first club Novi Pazar, two half seasons with FK Borac Čačak and a half season with FK Sevojno. In summer 2008 he moved to a newly top promoted ambitious club FK Jagodina. In summer 2011 he moved back to FK Novi Pazar and played in Serbian Superliga.

== Personal life ==
Vusljanin was born on 7 January 1986 in Novi Pazar, Sandžak, Serbia (then part of Yugoslavia). He is ethnic Bosniak.
