= Mirsad Ramić =

Bosnian association football player

Personal information
- Date of birth: 6 December 1992 (age 33)
- Place of birth: Jablanica, Bosnia and Herzegovina
- Height: 1.92 m (6 ft 4 in)
- Position: Centre-forward

Team information
- Current team: Klis Buturović Polje
- Number: 9

Youth career
- –2011: Turbina Jablanica
- 2011: Željezničar

Senior career*
Years	Team	Apps	(Gls)
2011–2014	Željezničar	22	(2)
2013	→ Zvijezda Gradačac (loan)	6	(0)
2013	→ Travnik (loan)	19	(4)
2014–2015	Turbina Jablanica	14	(4)
2015	Goražde	5	(0)
2016	Zvijezda Gradačac	13	(1)
2016–2019	GOŠK Gabela	80	(29)
2019–2022	Tuzla City	48	(4)
2021–2022	→ Sloboda Tuzla (loan)	29	(6)
2022–2025	Igman Konjic	82	(32)
2025–2026	Makedonija GP	9	(0)
2026–	Klis Buturović Polje	0	(0)
- * Club domestic league appearances and goals as of 14 March 2026

Mirsad Ramić (born 6 December 1992) is a Bosnian professional footballer who plays as a centre-forward for Bosnian Second League club Klis Buturović Polje.

== Club career ==
Ramić had success with Željezničar, winning the Premier League and the cup in the 2011–12 season. In the 2016–17 First League of FBiH season, Ramić won the league with GOŠK Gabela and got promoted to the Bosnian Premier League. In May 2019, he left GOŠK after the club got relegated back to the First League of FBiH.

On 31 May 2019, a few days after leaving GOŠK, Ramić signed a three-year contract with Tuzla City.

== Honours ==
Željezničar

- Bosnian Premier League: 2011–12
- Bosnian Cup: 2011–12

GOŠK Gabela

- First League of FBiH: 2016–17
