= Almir Pliska =

Bosnian-Herzegovinian footballer (born 1987)

Personal information
- Date of birth: 12 August 1987 (age 39)
- Place of birth: Sarajevo, SFR Yugoslavia
- Height: 1.88 m (6 ft 2 in)
- Position: Forward

Senior career*
Years	Team	Apps	(Gls)
2008–2010	Sarajevo	37	(2)
2010–2012	Olimpik Sarajevo	26	(7)
2013	Velež Mostar	12	(0)
2013	Travnik	18	(1)
2014	Partizani Tirana	5	(1)
2014	Goražde		
2015	Moravac Mrštane	11	(4)
2015	Zvijezda Gradačac		
2016	Slavija Sarajevo	5	(0)
2016–2017	Čelik Zenica	12	(1)
- * Club domestic league appearances and goals

Almir Pliska (born 12 August 1987) is a Bosnian-Herzegovinian former professional footballer who played as a forward.

== Career ==
Pliska was, together with Asim Škaljić, snapped up by Olimpik Sarajevo in December 2010 He played in Serbian First League with Moravac Mrštane.
