= Dejan Janković =

Serbian footballer

Personal information
- Full name: Dejan Janković
- Date of birth: 6 January 1986 (age 40)
- Place of birth: Bečej, SFR Yugoslavia
- Height: 1.82 m (6 ft 0 in)
- Position: Central midfielder

Senior career*
Years	Team	Apps	(Gls)
2004–2005	Jedinstvo Ub	3	(0)
2005	Hajduk Beograd	6	(0)
2006–2008	Radnički Obrenovac	57	(9)
2008–2011	Srem	91	(6)
2012	Radnički Obrenovac	12	(3)
2012–2013	Leotar	24	(5)
2013	Voždovac	1	(0)
2014–2016	Velež Mostar	42	(10)
2016–2018	Radnik Bijeljina	39	(4)
2020–2022	Radnički Sremska Mitrovica	48	(3)
- * Club domestic league appearances and goals as of 13 August 2021

Dejan Janković (Serbian Cyrillic: Дејан Јанковић; born 6 January 1986) is a Serbian retired football midfielder who last played for Radnički Sremska Mitrovica.
