= Ivan Matošević =

Croatian footballer (born 1989)

Personal information
- Full name: Ivan Matošević
- Date of birth: 27 February 1989 (age 37)
- Place of birth: Pula, SFR Yugoslavia
- Height: 1.80 m (5 ft 11 in)
- Position: Winger

Youth career
- 1994–2003: Rovinj
- 2003–2004: Varteks
- 2004–2007: NK Dinamo Zagreb
- 2007–2009: HNK Hajduk

Senior career*
Years	Team	Apps	(Gls)
2009–2011	Rovinj	29	(6)
2011	Zadar	18	(2)
2012	Vorwärts Steyr	3	(1)
2012–2013	FK Sarajevo	0	(0)
2013–2014	Rovinj	26	(1)
2014	Pomorac	11	(0)
2015	Wallern	9	(1)
Total		96	(11)
- * Club domestic league appearances and goals

Ivan Matošević (born 27 February 1989) is a Croatian professional footballer.

== Club career ==
Matošević had spells in Austria with Vorwärts Steyr and Wallern.
