= Vule Trivunović =

Bosnian football manager (born 1983)

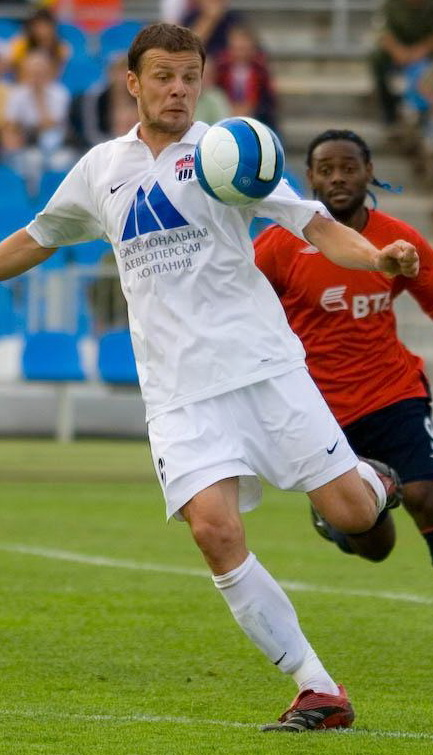
- Trivunović (front) playing for Khimki in 2007

Personal information
- Full name: Vule Trivunović
- Date of birth: 13 March 1983 (age 43)
- Place of birth: Glamoč, SFR Yugoslavia
- Height: 1.88 m (6 ft 2 in)
- Position: Centre-back

Youth career
- 1995–1999: Borac Banja Luka
- 1999: Obilić

Senior career*
Years	Team	Apps	(Gls)
2000	Borac Banja Luka	2	(0)
2000–2002	Obilić	0	(0)
2002–2003	→ Borac Banja Luka (loan)	29	(3)
2003–2004	Obilić	8	(0)
2004–2005	Wacker Burghausen	5	(0)
2005–2006	Sarajevo	41	(3)
2007–2009	Khimki	63	(3)
2010–2011	Borac Banja Luka	27	(1)
2011	Cracovia	11	(2)
2012	Zhetysu	9	(0)
2012–2013	Borac Banja Luka	22	(3)
2013–2014	Sarajevo	24	(0)
Total		241	(15)

International career
2004	Bosnia and Herzegovina U21	1	(0)
2006	Bosnia and Herzegovina	3	(0)

Managerial career
- 2014: BSK Banja Luka
- 2015: Sloboda Mrkonjić Grad
- 2016–2017: Borac Banja Luka
- 2017–2018: Kozara Gradiška
- 2019–2020: GOŠK Gabela
- 2022: Ethnikos Achna
- 2023–2025: Rudar Prijedor
- 2025: Sloga Doboj
- * Club domestic league appearances and goals

Vule Trivunović (Serbian Cyrillic: Вуле Тривуновић; born 13 March 1983) is a Bosnian professional football manager and former player.

== Club career ==
As a player, Trivunović played for Sarajevo and Borac Banja Luka in the Bosnian Premier League, as well as numerous stints abroad in clubs from Serbia, Germany, Russia, Poland and Kazakhstan. In his playing career, he won two Bosnian Cups. His first with Borac and his second one with Sarajevo.

== International career ==
Trivunović played for the Bosnia and Herzegovina U-21 and made his senior debut for Bosnia and Herzegovina in an August 2006 friendly match against France and has earned a total of 3 caps, scoring no goals. His final international was an October 2006 European Championship qualification match away against Moldova.

== Managerial career ==
After retiring, Trivunović became a professional football manager. He managed BSK Banja Luka, Sloboda Mrkonjić Grad, Borac, with whom he won the 2016–17 First League of RS, Kozara Gradiška and GOŠK Gabela. Following GOŠK, he was a manager at Cypriot club Ethnikos Achna and Rudar Prijedor.

On 20 May 2025, Trivunović was appointed manager of Bosnian Premier League side Sloga Doboj. He suffered defeat in his first match in charge, losing 1–0 away to Široki Brijeg on 25 May. Following mixed results in the team's first ten league games of the 2025–26 season, Trivunović left the club by mutual consent on 5 October 2025.

== Managerial statistics ==
As of match played 4 October 2025

Managerial record by team and tenure
Team	From	To	Record							
Team	From	To	G	W	D	L	GF	GA	GD	Win %
BSK Banja Luka	1 July 2014	20 November 2014	13	7	3	3	18	14	+4	53.85
Sloboda Mrkonjić Grad	1 January 2015	30 June 2015	12	5	1	6	15	18	−3	41.67
Borac Banja Luka	11 October 2016	26 May 2017	19	17	2	0	43	7	+36	89.47
Kozara Gradiška	5 December 2017	19 December 2018	33	13	9	11	40	35	+5	39.39
GOŠK Gabela	28 October 2019	22 August 2020	8	4	1	3	12	11	+1	50.00
Ethnikos Achna	1 September 2022	7 November 2022	8	3	1	4	12	16	−4	37.50
Rudar Prijedor	9 October 2023	24 January 2025	42	20	13	9	70	32	+38	47.62
Sloga Doboj	20 May 2025	5 October 2025	12	3	3	6	7	14	−7	25.00
Total			147	72	33	42	217	147	+70	48.98

== Honours ==
=== Player ===
Borac Banja Luka

- Bosnian Cup: 2009–10

Sarajevo

- Bosnian Cup: 2013–14

Individual

- Bosnian Premier League Player of the Year: 2010

=== Manager ===
Borac Banja Luka

- First League of RS: 2016–17
