= Anid Travančić =

Bosnian footballer

Personal information
- Date of birth: 7 September 1993 (age 33)
- Place of birth: Tešanj, Bosnia and Herzegovina
- Height: 1.70 m (5 ft 7 in)
- Position: Attacking midfielder

Team information
- Current team: Vis Simm-Bau
- Number: 9

Youth career
- 2010: Čelik Zenica
- 2010: Zagreb
- 2011: Hajduk Split
- 2011: Lokomotiva

Senior career*
Years	Team	Apps	(Gls)
2012–2013	Čelik Zenica	31	(2)
2013–2014	Sarajevo	17	(3)
2015–2016	TOŠK Tešanj		
2016	Proleter Teslić		
2016–2017	Novi Pazar	15	(3)
2017–2018	Radnički Niš	15	(1)
2019	Team Wiener Linien	10	(3)
2019	TOŠK Tešanj	2	(0)
2020–2021	NK Usora		
2021–	Vis Simm-Bau	4	(0)

International career
2009	Bosnia and Herzegovina U17	10	(1)
2010	Bosnia and Herzegovina U19	3	(0)
2012–2013	Bosnia and Herzegovina U21	2	(0)
- * Club domestic league appearances and goals as of 09:40, 3 April 2021 (UTC)

Anid Travančić (born 30 September 1993) is a Bosnian professional footballer who plays as an attacking midfielder for NK Vis Simm-Bau.

== Club career ==
He started playing in the youth team of a minor club, NK Borac Jelah, from where he moved to Croatia and joined the youth team of NK Zagreb. Then, after a short come-back to Bosnia where he played with Čelik Zenica, he played with other Croatian youth teams, namely, of the giants HNK Hajduk Split, and of Dinamo Zagreb satellite club, NK Lokomotiva.

Then he returned again to Bosnia and Herzegovina and signed with Čelik Zenica, only that this time he was added to the senior squad and he made his senior debut in the 2011–12 Premier League of Bosnia and Herzegovina. He made two solid seasons with Čelik and in summer 2013 he was on the spotlights of many clubs from the region. The first one was Serbian former 1991 European and World champions Red Star Belgrade which brought him for trials, but he failed. After failing to sign with Red Star, he was brought by the Bosnian powerhouse FK Sarajevo, which was in the rise after recently being acquired by the Malaysian businessman and investor Vincent Tan and was strongly investing to form a strong side.

Travančić won with Sarajevo the 2013–14 Bosnian Cup, but the squad failed to achieve the desired exhibitions so the team went under total restoration. Travančić left Sarajevo and during the next season he played the first half with NK TOŠK Tešanj in the Second League of the Federation of Bosnia and Herzegovina, and the second half of the season with Proleter Teslić in the First League of the Republika Srpska. The two leagues he played that season are the two leagues forming the second level of the Bosnian league system.

In the summer of 2016, he signed a contract with Novi Pazar. He made his debut in the 2016–17 Serbian SuperLiga as a starter on July 30, 2016, in an away first-round game against Javor Ivanjica, which ended in a 1–1 draw. After Novi Pazar, Travančić also played for FK Radnički Niš and Austrian club SC Team Wiener Linien.

On 2 July 2019, Travančić returned to and signed a contract with TOŠK Tešanj. He played his first match since his return to TOŠK on 24 August 2019, in a 3–0 away league loss against FK Goražde. Only two months after returning to TOŠK, on 30 September 2019, Travančić left the club again after only playing in two of TOŠK's eight league games since the beginning of the season.

In February 2020, Travančić signed with NK Usora.

== International career ==
Travančić made 10 appearances and scored 1 goal for the Bosnia and Herzegovina U17 national team. After the under-17 team, he made three appearances for the Bosnia and Herzegovina U19 national team in 2010.

Finally, from 2012 to 2013, Travančić played 2 times but did not score a goal for the U21 national team.

== Honours ==
Sarajevo

- Bosnian Cup: 2013–14
