= Asim Škaljić =

Bosnian footballer (born 1981)

Personal information
- Date of birth: 9 August 1981 (age 45)
- Place of birth: Mostar, SFR Yugoslavia
- Height: 1.83 m (6 ft 0 in)
- Positions: Centre-back; right-back

Team information
- Current team: Al-Seeb Club (assistant)

Youth career
- 1989–2000: Velež Mostar

Senior career*
Years	Team	Apps	(Gls)
2000–2004	Velež Mostar	27	(0)
2004–2007	Sion	41	(0)
2007	Chiasso	11	(0)
2008–2011	Velež Mostar	50	(0)
2011–2013	Olimpik Sarajevo	48	(0)
2013	Željezničar Sarajevo	6	(0)
2014–2016	Velež Mostar	32	(0)
2016	GOŠK Gabela	13	(0)
Total		228	(0)

International career
2002	Bosnia and Herzegovina	1	(0)
- * Club domestic league appearances and goals

Asim Škaljić (born 9 August 1981) is a Bosnian retired professional footballer who played as a centre-back and sometimes as a right-back.

== Club career ==
In between two spells at hometown club Velež Mostar Škaljić played in Switzerland. He was snapped up together with Almir Pliska by Olimpik in December 2010 and he joined Željezničar in summer 2013 but left them for another stint at Velež in January 2014. He then left Velež for a third time in his career in 2016, when he moved to second tier GOŠK Gabela.

== International career ==
Škaljić made one appearance for Bosnia and Herzegovina, coming on as a second-half substitute for Zlatan Bajramović in an August 2002 friendly match against Serbia and Montenegro.

== Honours ==
Sion

- Swiss Cup: 2006
