= Moossou FC =

Ivorian football club

- Full name: Moossou Football Club
- Founded: 2001; 25 years ago
- Ground: Vitib Bassam; Bassam
- Chairman: Anatole Affouri
- Manager: Théodore Broukou
- League: Ligue 1
- 2018/2019: 14th
Home colours	Away colours

Moossou F.C. is an Ivorian football club based in Bassam. Founded in 2001, the club competes in the Ligue 1.

== Honours ==
- Coupe de la Ligue de Côte d'Ivoire
  - Winners (1): 2016
