= Dino Bišanović =

Bosnian footballer (born 1990)

Personal information
- Date of birth: 13 March 1990 (age 36)
- Place of birth: Bijeljina, SR BiH, SFR Yugoslavia
- Height: 1.83 m (6 ft 0 in)
- Position: Midfielder

Team information
- Current team: SV Eintracht Hohkeppel
- Number: 6

Youth career
- –1999: SC Meschenich
- 1999–2009: 1. FC Köln

Senior career*
| Years | Team | Apps | (Gls) |
| 2009–2013 | 1. FC Köln II | 93 | (9) |
| 2012–2013 | 1. FC Köln | 0 | (0) |
| 2013–2014 | Sarajevo | 12 | (0) |
| 2014–2015 | Fortuna Köln | 4 | (0) |
| 2015 | Fortuna Köln II | 1 | (0) |
| 2015–2023 | TSV Steinbach Haiger | 178 | (20) |
| 2023– | SV Eintracht Hohkeppel | 7 | (1) |
- * Club domestic league appearances and goals as of 24 September 2023

Dino Bišanović (born 13 March 1990) is a Bosnian footballer who plays as a midfielder for German Regionalliga club SV Eintracht Hohkeppel.
