= Dušan Jevtić =

Bosnian-Herzegovinian footballer

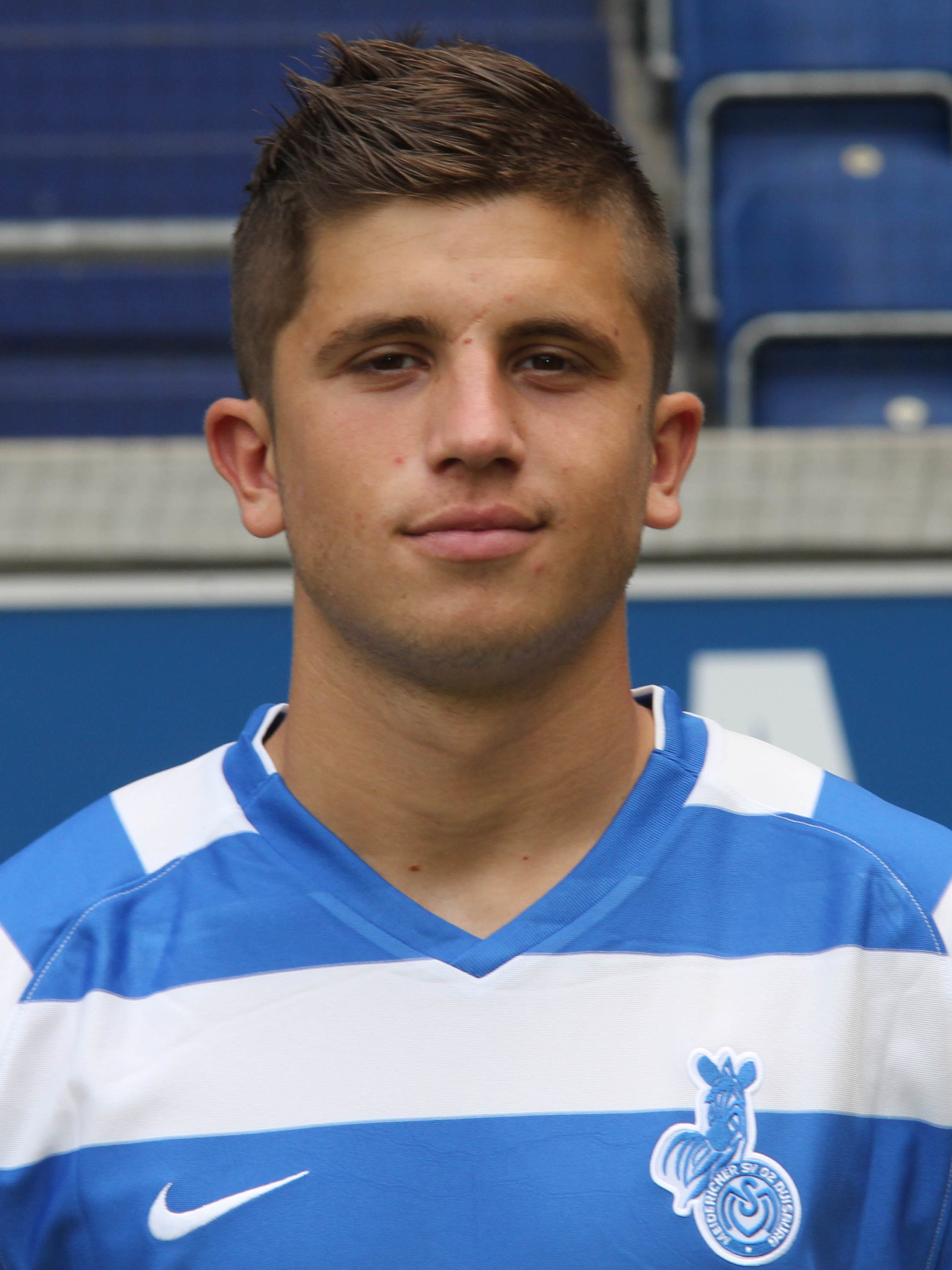
- Jevtic in 2012

Personal information
- Date of birth: 29 March 1992 (age 34)
- Place of birth: Gradačac, Republic of Bosnia and Herzegovina
- Height: 1.75 m (5 ft 9 in)
- Position: Midfielder

Senior career*
Years	Team	Apps	(Gls)
2011	TSV 1860 München II	7	(0)
2012–2013	MSV Duisburg	2	(0)
2013–2014	FK Sarajevo	6	(0)
2015	IK Oddevold	5	(0)
2016	Čelik Zenica	4	(0)
2017–2018	TSV Buchbach	15	(1)
2018	VfR Garching	15	(2)
2018–2019	SV Pullach	13	(1)
2019–2020	Türkspor Augsburg	14	(5)
2020–2022	TSV Schwabmünchen		

International career
2011	Bosnia and Herzegovina U19	1	(0)
2013	Bosnia and Herzegovina U21	1	(0)
- * Club domestic league appearances and goals

Dušan Jevtić (born 29 March 1992) is a Bosnian-Herzegovinian former footballer who played as a midfielder.

== Club career ==
Jevtić was born in Gradačac. He joined FK Sarajevo in August 2013, and was released later that 2013–14 season. He previously played for Duisburg since the winter of 2012, after he spent his youth and first years as a senior playing for 1860 Munich. He spent the majority of his career in the German 4th and 5th tiers.

== Later life ==
Jevtić works as a player agent.
