= Mahir Karić =

Bosnian footballer (born 1992)

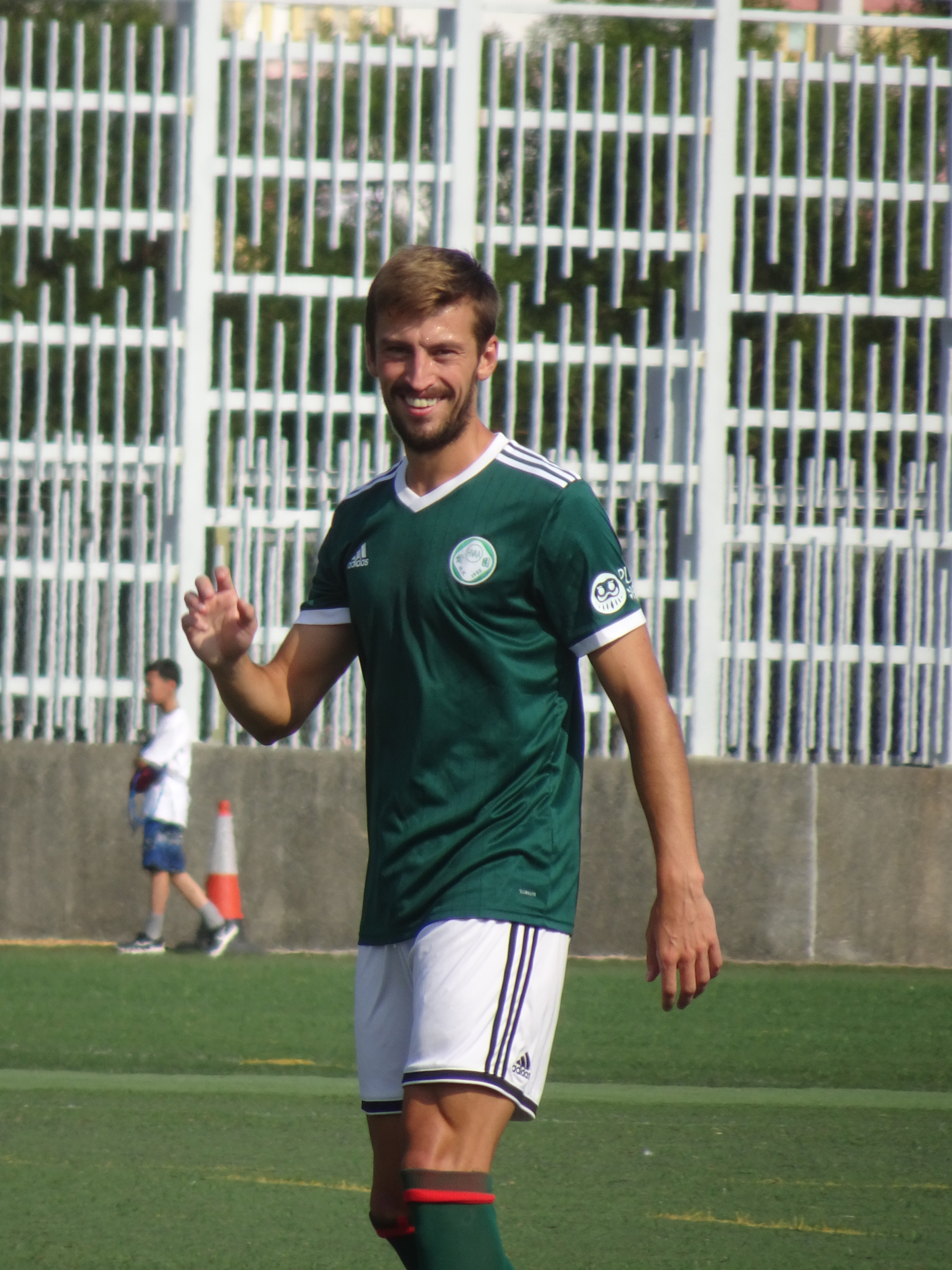
- Karić with Happy Valley in 2018

Personal information
- Date of birth: 5 March 1992 (age 34)
- Place of birth: Sarajevo, Bosnia and Herzegovina
- Height: 1.86 m (6 ft 1 in)
- Position: Midfielder

Team information
- Current team: Leotar
- Number: 19

Youth career
- 2004–2005: Rudar Prijedor
- 2005–2009: Željezničar
- 2010–2011: Slovan Liberec

Senior career*
Years	Team	Apps	(Gls)
2011–2012	Rudar Prijedor	8	(0)
2012–2013	Travnik	5	(0)
2013	Baník Most 1909	0	(0)
2013–2015	Slavija Sarajevo	54	(7)
2015–2017	Olimpik	50	(2)
2017	→ Vitez (loan)	16	(0)
2018	Borac Banja Luka	13	(0)
2018–2020	Happy Valley	33	(19)
2020–2021	Olimpik	20	(0)
2021–2022	Goražde	26	(4)
2022–2023	Leotar	32	(1)
2023–	Slavija Sarajevo	80	(7)
- * Club domestic league appearances and goals as of 26 November 2025

Mahir Karić (born 5 March 1992) is a Bosnian professional footballer who plays as a midfielder for First League of RS club Slavija Sarajevo.

== Career ==
=== Happy Valley ===
On 14 August 2018, Karić left Europe after playing football there for 7 years and signed with Hong Kong First Division club Happy Valley. He scored 17 goals in 25 games and helped the club to promote to the Hong Kong Premier League in the 2019–20 season. On 28 May 2020, Happy Valley announced that Karić would leave the club at the end of his contract.

=== Olimpik ===
On 29 September 2020, Karić signed a contract with Bosnian Premier League club Olimpik. He made his official debut for the club in a league loss against Željezničar on 17 October 2020.

== Honours ==
Happy Valley

- Hong Kong First Division: 2018–19
