= Ermin Huseinbašić =

Bosnian professional footballer (born 1993)

Personal information
- Date of birth: 11 July 1993 (age 33)
- Place of birth: Gradačac, Bosnia and Herzegovina
- Height: 1.80 m (5 ft 11 in)
- Position: Forward

Team information
- Current team: Marsonia
- Number: 11

Youth career
- –2005: Bosna Mionica
- 2005–2010: Zvijezda Gradačac

Senior career*
Years	Team	Apps	(Gls)
2010	Zvijezda Gradačac	15	(6)
2010–2012	Gradina	25	(15)
2013	Sarajevo	15	(4)
2014	Sloboda Tuzla	15	(6)
2014	Istra 1961	14	(4)
2016	Bratstvo Gračanica	20	(8)
2017	Zvijezda Gradačac	22	(10)
2017–2019	Zvijezda 09	52	(16)
2019–2020	Čelik Zenica	17	(2)
2020–2021	Radnik Bijeljna	22	(3)
2022-	Marsonia		
- * Club domestic league appearances and goals as of 18 April 2021

Ermin Huseinbašić (born 11 July 1993) is a Bosnian professional footballer who plays as a forward.

== Club career ==
Born in Gradačac, Huseinbašić started his career at the lower-tier Bosna Mionica, before moving, aged 12, to the bigger Zvijezda Gradačac. As the U17 team and league top scorer, he got his chance to debut, aged 16, in the Bosnian Premier League.

In the summer of 2010, however, he moved to second-tier club Gradina, becoming a regular in the first team. His performance in the first half of the 2011–12 season, becoming the top scorer at the halfway point with 11 goals from the first 15 rounds, he went on trial with the Belgian side Gent. Having satisfied the coaches and having passed the medical exam, Huseinbašić nevertheless failed the fitness exam and wasn't signed.

Gradina qualified for the Bosnian Premier League, however, and after the first half of the season there, he moved to Sarajevo, the team he, according to his words, rooted for. After a year at Sarajevo, Huseinbašić rescinded his contract and moved to Sloboda Tuzla and, the following summer, joined Croatian 1. HNL team Istra 1961, making his debut on 28 July 2014, in a 1–1 away draw against Split.

After Istra, Huseinbašić also played for Bratstvo Gračanica in 2016 and for Zvijezda Gradačac in 2017, before joining Zvijezda 09 on 27 June 2017. With Zvijezda, he won the First League of RS in the 2017–18 season and got promoted to the Bosnian Premier League. On 27 May 2019, after his contract with Zvijezda 09 expired, Huseinbašić left the club. Only hours after leaving the club, he was named the Zvijezda 09 player of the 2018–19 season by the club supporters.

On 2 June 2019, Huseinbašić signed a two-year contract with Čelik Zenica. He made his debut and scored his first goal for Čelik on 22 July 2019, in a 0–1 away league win against Široki Brijeg. Huseinbašić left Čelik on 16 June 2020 after terminating his contract with the club.

On 23 July 2020, he joined Radnik Bijeljna. Huseinbašić made his official debut for Radnik in a league game against his former team Sloboda Tuzla on 1 August 2020. He left Radnik in June 2021.

== Honours ==
Zvijezda 09

- First League of RS: 2017–18

=== Individual ===
Awards

- Zvijezda 09 Player of the Season by supporters: 2018–19
