= Nikola Komazec =

Serbian footballer (born 1987)

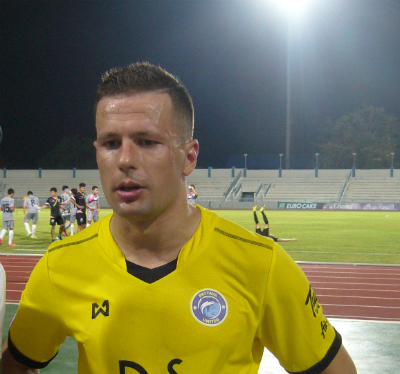
- Komazec with Pattaya United in 2015

Personal information
- Date of birth: 15 November 1987 (age 38)
- Place of birth: Titov Vrbas, SFR Yugoslavia
- Height: 1.89 m (6 ft 2 in)
- Position: Forward

Team information
- Current team: Sloboda Tuzla

Youth career
- Crvenka

Senior career*
Years	Team	Apps	(Gls)
2005–2011	Hajduk Kula	118	(16)
2011–2012	Petrolul Ploiești	12	(2)
2012	Maribor	13	(3)
2013	Suphanburi	1	(0)
2013	Sarajevo	16	(10)
2014	Busan IPark	1	(0)
2014–2015	Haugesund	3	(0)
2015	→ Pattaya United (loan)	14	(7)
2016	Dinamo Batumi	13	(4)
2016–2017	South China	20	(13)
2017	Smouha	0	(0)
2017	Salam Zgharta	6	(1)
2018	Pegasus	5	(1)
2018	Bhayangkara	12	(2)
2018–2019	Southern	17	(7)
2020	Kitchee	7	(3)
2021	Košice	4	(0)
2021	Kasetsart	15	(2)
2022	Ayutthaya United	13	(3)
2022–2023	Sloboda Tuzla	26	(5)
2023–2024	Rudar Prijedor	15	(6)
2024	Sloboda Tuzla	14	(4)
2024–2025	Zvijezda 09	12	(3)
2025	Železničar Inđija		(4)
2025–	Sloboda Tuzla	11	(0)
- * Club domestic league appearances and goals as of 11 June 2026

Nikola Komazec (Serbian Cyrillic: Никола Комазец; born 15 November 1987) is a Serbian professional footballer who plays as a forward for Sloboda Tuzla.

== Club career ==
In July 2014, Komazec signed for Norwegian Tippeligaen side FK Haugesund. He moved on loan to Pattaya United in January 2015 for six months.

In February 2016, he moved to Georgian side FC Dinamo Batumi.

On 19 July 2016, he moved to Hong Kong Premier League club South China. However, after the season, South China decided to voluntarily self-relegate in order to cut costs. The club and Komazec agreed to a compensation package to terminate his contract on 9 August 2017.

On 19 August 2017, Egyptian club Smouha announced that they had signed Komazec.

On 27 December 2019, Komazec joined Hong Kong Premier League side Kitchee.

== Career statistics ==
As of 14 May 2017

Appearances and goals by club, season and competition
Club	Season	League			National cup		Continental		Total	
Club	Season	Division	Apps	Goals	Apps	Goals	Apps	Goals	Apps	Goals
Hajduk Kula	2004–05	Serbian SuperLiga	2	0	0	0	—		2	0
Hajduk Kula	2005–06	Serbian SuperLiga	2	0	0	0	—		2	0
Hajduk Kula	2006–07	Serbian SuperLiga	16	2	0	0	—		16	2
Hajduk Kula	2007–08	Serbian SuperLiga	25	4	0	0	3	2	28	6
Hajduk Kula	2008–09	Serbian SuperLiga	20	1	0	0	—		20	1
Hajduk Kula	2009–10	Serbian SuperLiga	26	3	0	0	—		26	3
Hajduk Kula	2010–11	Serbian SuperLiga	27	6	0	0	—		27	6
Hajduk Kula	Total		118	16	0	0	3	2	121	18
Petrolul Ploiești	2011–12	Liga I	12	2	3	1	—		15	3
Maribor	2012–13	Slovenian PrvaLiga	13	3	1	0	7	0	21	3
Suphanburi	2013	Thai Premier League	1	0	0	0	—		1	0
Sarajevo	2013–14	Premier League	16	10	3	4	0	0	19	14
Busan IPark	2014	K League Classic	1	0	0	0	—		1	0
Haugesund	2014	Tippeligaen	3	0	1	0	0	0	4	0
Pattaya United (loan)	2015	Thai Division 1	14	7	0	0	—		14	7
Dinamo Batumi	2015–16	Umaglesi Liga	13	4	0	0	—		13	4
South China	2016–17	Hong Kong Premier League	20	13	4	2	2	2	26	17
Career total			211	55	12	7	12	4	235	66
