= 2012–13 FK Sarajevo season =

Sarajevo
2012–13 season
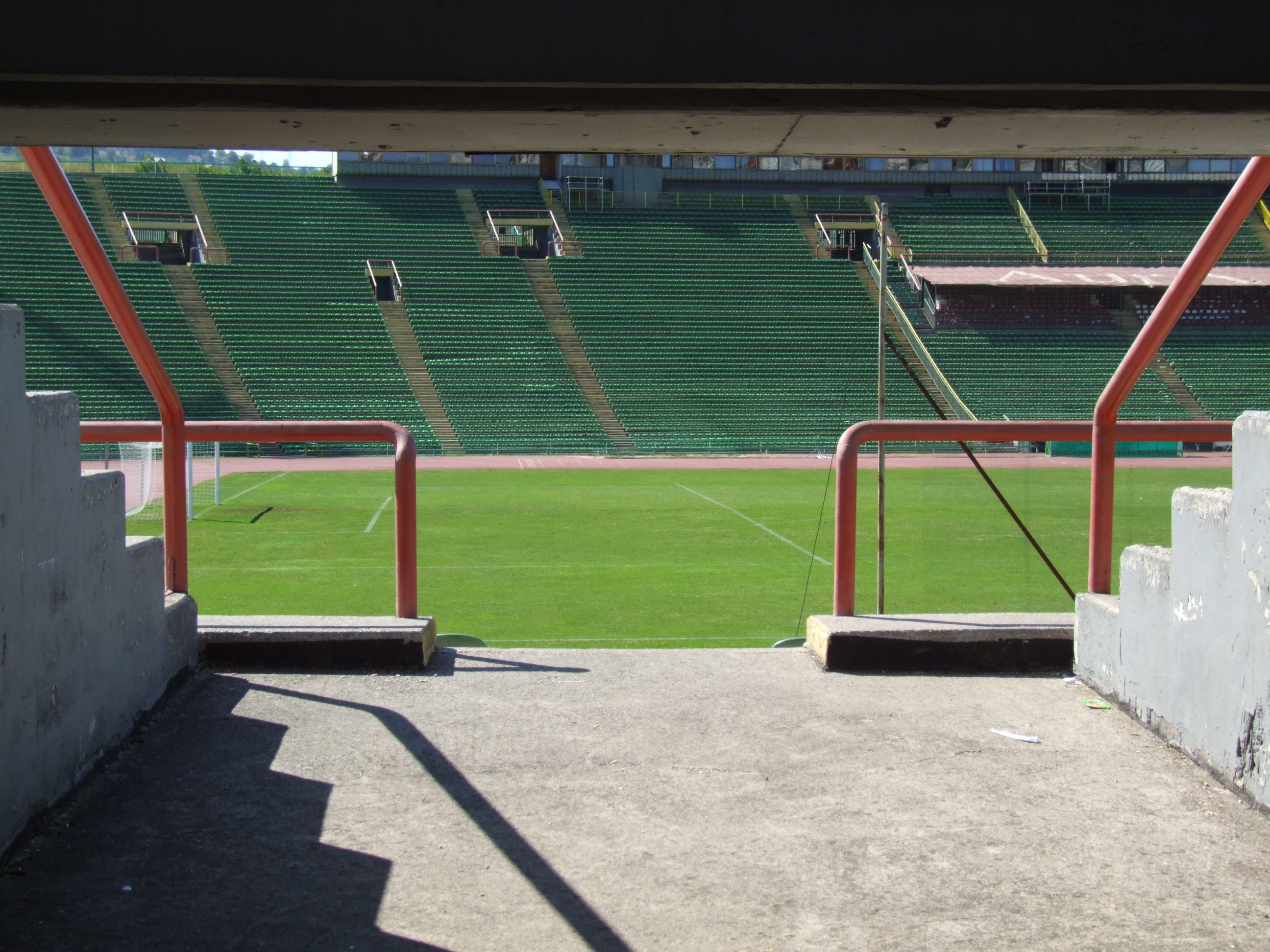
- Koševo stadium, Sarajevo 8.2012.
- General director: Dino Selimović
- Chairman: Amir Rizvanović; Alen Hujić
- Manager: Dragan Jović; Husref Musemić; Abdulah Oruč
- Stadium: Asim Ferhatović Hase Stadium
- Premier League BiH: 2nd
- Cup of BiH: Round of 16
- UEFA Europa League: Third qualifying round
- Top goalscorer: League: Emir Hadžić (20); All: Emir Hadžić (26)
- Highest home attendance: 13,000 vs Željezničar (3 November 2012)
- Lowest home attendance: 700 vs Slavija (11 May 2013)
- Average home league attendance: 4,412
- Biggest win: Sarajevo 5–0 Radnik (26 May 2013)
- Biggest defeat: Zrinjski 3–1 Sarajevo (3 October 2012)

The 2012–13 Sarajevo season was the club's 64th season in history, and their 19th consecutive season in the top flight of Bosnian football, the Premier League of BiH. Besides competing in the Premier League, the team competed in the National Cup and the qualifications for UEFA Europa League.

== Squad information ==
=== First-team squad ===
Note: Flags indicate national team as defined under FIFA eligibility rules; some limited exceptions apply. Players may hold more than one non-FIFA nationality.

No.	Pos.	Nation	Player
1	GK	BIH	Emir Plakalo
4	DF	MNE	Nemanja Mijušković
5	MF	BIH	Ivan Sesar
5	MF	BIH	Adnan Hrelja
6	DF	BIH	Sedin Torlak (Captain)
7	FW	BIH	Ermin Huseinbašić
7	MF	BIH	Said Husejinović
8	MF	BIH	Anes Haurdić
9	FW	BIH	Sulejman Krpić
9	FW	SRB	Alen Melunović
10	MF	BIH	Faris Handžić
11	FW	BIH	Emir Hadžić
12	GK	BIH	Almin Abdihodžić
13	MF	BIH	Ognjen Todorović
14	DF	SRB	Ivan Tatomirović
15	MF	BIH	Samir Radovac
16	MF	SRB	Radan Šunjevarić
17	MF	BIH	Boris Gujić
18	FW	BIH	Edin Ademović

No.	Pos.	Nation	Player
18	FW	BIH	Nermin Haskić
19	GK	BIH	Dejan Bandović
20	FW	SLO	Samir Nuhanović
21	MF	SRB	Žarko Karamatić
22	MF	BIH	Amer Osmanagić
23	MF	CRO	Ivan Matošević
23	DF	SRB	Zoran Belošević
25	FW	SEN	Secouba Diatta
25	DF	BIH	Fadil Čizmić
27	FW	BIH	Almir Aganspahić
28	DF	CRO	Mario Tadejević
29	DF	BIH	Amer Dupovac
34	GK	BIH	Adi Adilović
77	MF	SRB	Nemanja Zlatković
88	MF	BIH	Adin Čiva
89	DF	BIH	Denis Čomor
89	MF	BIH	Muhamed Džakmić (C)
99	MF	BIH	Asmir Suljić

== Transfers ==
=== In ===
Date	Pos.	Player	From	Fee	Ref.
9 June 2012	DF	(Bosnia and Herzegovina) Boris Gujić	(Hungary) Kaposvári Rákóczi	Free transfer	
11 June 2012	DF	(Serbia) Nemanja Zlatković	(Czech Republic) Fastav Zlín	Free transfer	
13 June 2012	FW	(Serbia) Žarko Karamatić	(Bosnia and Herzegovina) Slavija Sarajevo	€3,000	
14 June 2012	GK	(Bosnia and Herzegovina) Almin Abdihodžić	(Bosnia and Herzegovina) Krajina Cazin	Free transfer	
17 June 2012	DF	(Croatia) Mario Tadejević	(Croatia) Rijeka	Free transfer	
18 June 2012	MF	(Serbia) Radan Šunjevarić	(Serbia) Novi Pazar	Undisclosed	
30 June 2012	FW	(Bosnia and Herzegovina) Emir Hadžić	(Hungary) Budapest Honvéd	Free transfer	
1 August 2012	GK	(Bosnia and Herzegovina) Dejan Bandović	(Bosnia and Herzegovina) Velež Mostar	€10,000	
6 August 2012	FW	(Slovenia) Samir Nuhanović	(Bosnia and Herzegovina) Zvijezda Gradačac	Free transfer	
19 September 2012	DF	(Montenegro) Nemanja Mijušković	(Russia) Amkar Perm II	Undisclosed	
18 December 2012	FW	(Serbia) Edin Ademović	(Serbia) Novi Pazar	Free transfer	
23 December 2012	MF	(Bosnia and Herzegovina) Amer Osmanagić	(Norway) Haugesund	Free transfer	
14 January 2013	FW	(Bosnia and Herzegovina) Ermin Huseinbašić	(Bosnia and Herzegovina) OFK Gradina	Free transfer	
18 January 2013	FW	(Bosnia and Herzegovina) Ognjen Todorović	(Israel) Maccabi Petah Tikva	Free transfer	
28 January 2013	MF	(Bosnia and Herzegovina) Muhamed Džakmić	(South Korea) Gangwon	Free transfer	
23 February 2013	FW	(Serbia) Alen Melunović	(Czech Republic) Teplice	Free transfer	
23 February 2013	MF	(Bosnia and Herzegovina) Adnan Hrelja	(Hungary) Pécsi U19	Free transfer	
25 February 2013	MF	(Croatia) Ivan Matošević	(Austria) Vorwärts Steyr	Free transfer	
25 February 2013	MF	(Bosnia and Herzegovina) Anes Haurdić	(Czech Republic) Jablonec	Free transfer	
11 March 2013	FW	(Bosnia and Herzegovina) Almir Aganspahić	(Bosnia and Herzegovina) Olimpic U19	Free transfer	
Total				€13,000	

=== Out ===
Date	Pos.	Player	To	Fee	Ref.
24 May 2012	FW	(Croatia) Matija Matko	(Croatia) Inker Zaprešić	Contract termination	
25 May 2012	GK	(Serbia) Đorđe Pantić	Retired		
28 May 2012	MF	(Serbia) Vučina Sćepanović	(Bosnia and Herzegovina) Zrinjski Mostar	End of contract	
4 June 2012	MF	(Bosnia and Herzegovina) Kenan Handžić	(Croatia) Zagreb	Contract termination	
4 June 2012	FW	(Bosnia and Herzegovina) Amel Handžić	(Bosnia and Herzegovina) Jedinstvo Bihać	Contract termination	
9 June 2012	MF	(Bosnia and Herzegovina) Edin Husić	(Bosnia and Herzegovina) Zvijezda Gradačac	Contract termination	
13 June 2012	MF	(Bosnia and Herzegovina) Semir Bajraktarević	(Bosnia and Herzegovina) Čelik Zenica	End of contract	
16 June 2012	DF	(Bosnia and Herzegovina) Sanel Trebinjac	Free agent	Contract termination	
20 June 2012	FW	(Bosnia and Herzegovina) Emir Obuća	Retired		
29 June 2012	DF	(Bosnia and Herzegovina) Dilaver Zrnanović	(Azerbaijan) Simurq	End of contract	
28 July 2012	GK	(Bosnia and Herzegovina) Adi Adilović	(Greece) Panthrakikos	Undisclosed	
6 August 2012	FW	(Bosnia and Herzegovina) Nermin Haskić	(Serbia) Voždovac	End of contract	
30 November 2012	DF	(Bosnia and Herzegovina) Boris Gujić	(Serbia) Senta	Contract termination	
1 December 2012	FW	(Serbia) Žarko Karamatić	(Bosnia and Herzegovina) Radnik Bijeljina	Contract termination	
1 December 2012	FW	(Bosnia and Herzegovina) Sulejman Krpić	(Serbia) Metalac Gornji Milanovac	End of contract	
1 December 2012	FW	(Senegal) Secouba Diatta	(Bosnia and Herzegovina) Zvijezda Gradačac	Contract termination	
5 January 2013	FW	(Bosnia and Herzegovina) Said Husejinović	(Croatia) Dinamo Zagreb	€50,000	
8 January 2013	FW	(Slovenia) Samir Nuhanović	(Austria) Steinfeld	Contract termination	
10 January 2013	DF	(Serbia) Zoran Belošević	(Greece) Pierikos	End of contract	
14 January 2013	FW	(Serbia) Edin Ademović	(Serbia) BSK Borča	Contract termination	
Total				€50,000	

=== Loans out ===
Start date	End date	Pos.	Player	To	Ref.
26 January 2013	End of season	MF	(Bosnia and Herzegovina) Ivan Sesar	(Turkey) Elazığspor	

== Kit ==
Suppliers	Sponsors	
(Turkey) Lescon (Bosnia and Herzegovina) Haad	(Bosnia and Herzegovina) AurA (Bosnia and Herzegovina) Vakufska banka	Front
(Turkey) Lescon (Bosnia and Herzegovina) Haad	(Bosnia and Herzegovina) BH Telecom	Sleeves
(Turkey) Lescon (Bosnia and Herzegovina) Haad	(European Union) (Czech Republic) Škoda Auto	Shorts

== Pre-season and friendlies ==
Win Draw Loss Fixtures

19 June 2012 Friendly	Maribor (Slovenia)	6–3	(Bosnia and Herzegovina) Sarajevo	Rogoza, Slovenia
		Report	Husejinović; Karamatić; Čomor	Attendance: 400

22 June 2012 Friendly	Sarajevo (Bosnia and Herzegovina)	3–1	(Georgia (country)) Dila Gori	Rogoza, Slovenia
	Diatta; Krpić	Report

25 June 2012 Friendly	Sarajevo (Bosnia and Herzegovina)	1–0	(Ukraine) Tavriya Simferopol	Rogoza, Slovenia
	Husejinović	Report

30 June 2012 Friendly	Sarajevo (Bosnia and Herzegovina)	1–0	(Croatia) Split	Sarajevo
	Haskić	Report		Stadium: Asim Ferhatović Hase Stadium; Attendance: 2,000

29 July 2012 Friendly	Sarajevo (Bosnia and Herzegovina)	0–0	(Bosnia and Herzegovina) Zrinjski Mostar	Sarajevo
				Stadium: Stadion Otoka; Attendance: 1,000

6 September 2012 Friendly	Goražde (Bosnia and Herzegovina)	1–3	(Bosnia and Herzegovina) Sarajevo	Goražde
17:00			Ademović; Hadžić; Čomor	Stadium: Gradski stadion Midhat Drljević; Attendance: 200

8 September 2012 Želimir Vidović Cup	Dobrinja (Bosnia and Herzegovina)	0–5	(Bosnia and Herzegovina) Sarajevo	Sarajevo
			Belošević; Husejinović; Ademović; Nuhanović	Stadium: Stadion Otoka

9 September 2012 Želimir Vidović Cup	Olimpic (Bosnia and Herzegovina)	1–5	(Bosnia and Herzegovina) Sarajevo	Sarajevo
			Husejinović 36'; Čomor 44'; Nuhanović 58'; Hadžić 60'; Karamatić 68'	Stadium: Stadion Otoka; Attendance: 200

12 September 2012 Friendly	Radnik Donji Vakuf (Bosnia and Herzegovina)	0–4	(Bosnia and Herzegovina) Sarajevo	Donji Vakuf
			Tatomirović; Handžić; Krpić	Stadium: Gradski stadion (Donji Vakuf); Attendance: 250

26 September 2012 Friendly	Igman Ilidža (Bosnia and Herzegovina)	1–4	(Bosnia and Herzegovina) Sarajevo	Ilidža
			Own goal Husejinović; Čiva; Belošević	Stadium: Sportski centar Ilidža

21 November 2012 Friendly	Radnik Hadžići (Bosnia and Herzegovina)	0–0	(Bosnia and Herzegovina) Sarajevo	Hadžići
				Stadium: Gradski stadion (Hadžići); Attendance: 50

25 January 2013 Friendly	Sarajevo (Bosnia and Herzegovina)	1–0	(Bosnia and Herzegovina) Vitez	Sarajevo
	Tatomirović	Report		Stadium: Koševo training ground Attendance: 250

30 January 2013 Friendly	Branitelj (Bosnia and Herzegovina)	0–2	(Bosnia and Herzegovina) Sarajevo	Međugorje
		Report	Melunović; Horton

2 February 2013 Friendly	Velež Mostar (Bosnia and Herzegovina)	0–1	(Bosnia and Herzegovina) Sarajevo	Međugorje
		Report	Melunović	Attendance: 50

6 February 2013 Friendly	Sarajevo (Bosnia and Herzegovina)	0–1	(Bosnia and Herzegovina) Borac Banja Luka	Međugorje
		Report		Stadium: Sport Centar Međugorje

11 February 2013 Friendly	Sarajevo (Bosnia and Herzegovina)	6–1	(Hungary) Kaposvári Rákóczi	Opatija, Croatia
	Tadejević; Melunović; Hadžić; Osmanagić	Report

14 February 2013 Friendly	Rudar Velenje (Slovenia)	3–0	(Bosnia and Herzegovina) Sarajevo	Opatija, Croatia

15 February 2013 Friendly	Opatija (Croatia)	1–1	(Bosnia and Herzegovina) Sarajevo	Opatija, Croatia
			Plakalo

16 February 2013 Friendly	Gorica (Croatia)	0–0	(Bosnia and Herzegovina) Sarajevo	Umag, Croatia
				Stadium: Gradski stadion (Umag)

19 February 2013 Friendly	Pomorac Kostrena (Croatia)	2–1	(Bosnia and Herzegovina) Sarajevo	Kostrena, Croatia
		Report	Suljić	Stadium: Stadion Žuknica

23 February 2013 Friendly	Zrinjski Mostar (Bosnia and Herzegovina)	2–2	(Bosnia and Herzegovina) Sarajevo	Mostar
			Torlak; Hadžić	Stadium: Stadion pod Bijelim Brijegom; Attendance: 500; Referee: Dario Karačić (Čitluk)

27 March 2013 Friendly	Sarajevo (Bosnia and Herzegovina)	3–0	(Bosnia and Herzegovina) Famos-SAŠK Napredak	Sarajevo
	Hadžić; Melunović	Report		Stadium: Koševo training ground

== Competitions ==
=== Overview ===
Competition	First match	Last match	Starting round	Final position	Record							
Competition	First match	Last match	Starting round	Final position	Pld	W	D	L	GF	GA	GD	Win %
Premier League	5 August 2012	26 May 2013	Matchday 1	2nd	30	17	9	4	52	19	+33	56.67
Cup of BiH	18 September 2012	24 October 2012	First round	Second round	3	2	0	1	4	4	+0	66.67
Europa League	5 July 2012	9 August 2012	First qualifying round	Third qualifying round	6	3	1	2	14	10	+4	50.00
Total					39	22	10	7	70	33	+37	56.41

Source: Competitions

=== Premier League ===
==== League table ====
Pos	Team	Pld	W	D	L	GF	GA	GD	Pts	Qualification or relegation
1	Željezničar (C)	30	20	6	4	48	20	+28	66	Qualification to Champions League second qualifying round
2	Sarajevo	30	17	9	4	52	19	+33	60	Qualification to Europa League first qualifying round
3	Borac Banja Luka	30	14	9	7	43	25	+18	51	Ineligible for 2013–14 European competitions (Note: Borac Banja Luka, Čelik, Olimpic, Slavija and Leotar failed to get the UEFA license for the competition due to financial or infrastructural problems.)
4	Čelik	30	14	9	7	44	30	+14	51	Ineligible for 2013–14 European competitions
5	Olimpic	30	13	10	7	34	26	+8	49	Ineligible for 2013–14 European competitions

Source: SportSport.ba (in Bosnian)
Rules for classification: 1st points; 2nd goal difference; 3rd goals scored
For deciding champions, qualification to UEFA Europa League and relegation: 1st points; 2nd head-to-head points; 3rd head-to-head goal difference; 4th head-to-head goals scored; 5th head-to-head away goals scored; 6th goal difference; 7th goals scored
(C) Champions

==== Results summary ====
Overall								Home						Away					
Pld	W	D	L	GF	GA	GD	Pts	W	D	L	GF	GA	GD	W	D	L	GF	GA	GD
30	17	9	4	52	19	+33	60	13	2	0	34	5	+29	4	7	4	18	14	+4

Source: Sportsport.ba

==== Results by round ====
Round	1	2	3	4	5	6	7	8	9	10	11	12	13	14	15	16	17	18	19	20	21	22	23	24	25	26	27	28	29	30
Ground	H	A	H	A	H	H	A	H	A	H	A	H	A	H	A	A	H	A	H	A	A	H	A	H	A	H	A	H	A	H
Result	D	W	W	W	W	W	W	W	L	W	D	W	D	W	L	L	W	D	W	W	D	D	L	W	D	W	D	W	D	W
Position	8	1	1	2	1	1	1	1	1	1	1	1	1	1	2	2	2	2	2	2	2	2	2	2	2	2	2	2	2	2

Source: Competitions
A = Away; H = Home; W = Win; D = Draw; L = Loss

==== Matches ====
5 August 2012 1	Sarajevo	0–0	Čelik	Sarajevo
21:00	Husejinović (yellow card) 47'; Dupovac (yellow card) 54'; Belošević (yellow card) 89'	Report		Stadium: Asim Ferhatović Hase Stadium; Attendance: 3,500; Referee: Radislav Vukasović (Trebinje)

12 August 2012 2	Rudar Prijedor	1–3	Sarajevo	Prijedor
17:00		Report	Belošević 10', 58'; Suljić (yellow card) 43'; Husejinović 80'	Stadium: Gradski stadion (Prijedor); Attendance: 2,500; Referee: Goran Paradžik (Ljubuški)

18 August 2012 3	Sarajevo	3–1	Gradina	Sarajevo
17:00	Sesar (yellow card) 27'; Torlak 36' (yellow card) 77'; Hadžić 50'; Belošević (pen.); Suljić (yellow card) 60'	Report		Stadium: Asim Ferhatović Hase Stadium; Attendance: 3,000; Referee: Vedran Zovko (Mostar)

25 August 2012 4	Olimpic	0–1	Sarajevo	Sarajevo
17:00		Report	Torlak (yellow card) 19'; Belošević (pen.); Hadžić (yellow card) 45'; Šunjevarić (yellow card) 60'; Nuhanović (yellow card) 84'; Zlatković (yellow card) 86'	Stadium: Stadion Otoka; Attendance: 1,500; Referee: Vladimir Bjelica (I. Sarajevo)

2 September 2012 5	Sarajevo	4–0	GOŠK	Sarajevo
19:00	Hadžić 29', 40', 60'; Belošević 38'; Suljić (yellow card) 72'	Report		Stadium: Asim Ferhatović Hase Stadium; Attendance: 2,500; Referee: Eldis Prošić (Cazin)

15 September 2012 6	Sarajevo	4–1	Velež	Sarajevo
21:00	Hadžić 28'; Belošević 17' (pen.); Čomor (yellow card) 23' (goal) 46'; Torlak (yellow card) 87'	Report		Stadium: Asim Ferhatović Hase Stadium; Attendance: 2,500; Referee: Edin Jakupović (Bihać)

22 September 2012 7	Leotar	0–3	Sarajevo	Trebinje
16:00		Report	Hadžić 38', 71'; Zlatković (yellow card) 56'; Suljić (yellow card) 63' (goal) 68'	Stadium: Stadion Police; Attendance: 1,500; Referee: Muamer Bureković (Zenica)

30 September 2012 8	Sarajevo	2–1	Široki Brijeg	Sarajevo
18:00	Husejinović 45'; Torlak 63'; Suljić (yellow card) 82'	Report		Stadium: Asim Ferhatović Hase Stadium; Attendance: 7,000; Referee: Danijel Pajić (Bijeljina)

6 October 2012 9	Travnik	1–0	Sarajevo	Travnik
14:00		Report	Šunjevarić (yellow card) 40'	Stadium: Stadion Pirota; Attendance: 2,500; Referee: Edin Jakupović (Bihać)

20 October 2012 10	Sarajevo	2–0	Borac	Sarajevo
19:00	Torlak 21'; Suljić (yellow card) 30'; Šunjevarić (yellow card) 61'; Tadejević 69'	Report		Stadium: Asim Ferhatović Hase Stadium; Attendance: 4,500; Referee: Goran Paradžik (Ljubuški)

27 October 2012 11	Zvijezda	2–2	Sarajevo	Gradačac
14:30		Report	Zlatković (yellow card) 34'; Belošević (pen.); Husejinović 54'; Tadejević (yellow card) 88'; Selimović (red card)	Stadium: Banja Ilidža (Gradačac); Attendance: 2,500; Referee: Darko Obradović (Stolac)

3 November 2012 12	Sarajevo	1–0	Željezničar	Sarajevo
20:00	Dupovac (yellow card) 37'; Suljić (yellow card) 38'; Hadžić (yellow card) 42'; Torlak (yellow card) 44'; Nuhanović 66'	Report		Stadium: Asim Ferhatović Hase Stadium; Attendance: 13,000; Referee: Elmir Pilav

11 November 2012 13	Slavija	0–0	Sarajevo	Istočno Sarajevo
13:00		Report	Sesar (yellow card) 52'; Šunjevarić (yellow card) 76'; Zlatković (yellow card) 80'; Karamatić (yellow card) 83'	Stadium: Gradski SRC Slavija; Attendance: 2,500; Referee: Ilija Živković (Orašje)

18 November 2012 14	Sarajevo	1–0	Zrinjski	Sarajevo
17:00	Dupovac 30'; Sesar (yellow card) 46'; Torlak (yellow card) 80'; Nuhanović (yellow card) 90'	Report		Stadium: Asim Ferhatović Hase Stadium; Attendance: 3,500; Referee: Dragan Skakić (Gradiška)

24 November 2012 15	Radnik	2–1	Sarajevo	Bijeljina
13:00		Report	Dupovac (yellow card) 29'; Hadžić 87'	Stadium: Gradski stadion (Bijeljina); Attendance: 1,600; Referee: Husein Terzić (Travnik)

2 March 2013 16	Čelik	3–2	Sarajevo	Zenica
14:00		Report	Melunović 30' (yellow card); Hadžić 56'; Suljić (yellow card) 67'; Zlatković (yellow card) 74'	Stadium: Bilino Polje Stadium; Attendance: 7,500; Referee: Ognjen Valjić (Banja Luka)

9 March 2013 17	Sarajevo	3–0	Rudar Prijedor	Sarajevo
14:00	Hadžić 19', 73'; Melunović 24'; Dupovac (yellow card) 70'	Report		Stadium: Asim Ferhatović Hase Stadium; Attendance: 2,500; Referee: Eldis Prošić (Cazin)

16 March 2013 18	Gradina	0–0	Sarajevo	Srebrenik
15:00		Report		Stadium: Gradski stadion (Srebrenik); Attendance: 1,600; Referee: Radislav Vukasović (Trebinje)

30 March 2013 19	Sarajevo	3–1	Olimpic	Sarajevo
15:30	Hadžić 14', 77'; Todorović 62'; Melunović (yellow card) 90'	Report		Stadium: Asim Ferhatović Hase Stadium; Attendance: 4,000; Referee: Predrag Stankić (Bijeljina)

7 April 2013 20	GOŠK	0–2	Sarajevo	Gabela
16:30		Report	Hadžić 20' (yellow card) 76'; Haurdić (yellow card) 63'; Džakmić 88'	Stadium: Stadion Podavala; Attendance: 400; Referee: Tomislav Čuić (Tomislavgrad)

10 April 2013 21	Velež	0–0	Sarajevo	Mostar
16:30		Report	Bandović (yellow card) 11'; Šunjevarić (yellow card) 45'; Haurdić (yellow card) 59'; Melunović (yellow card) 80'; Džakmić (yellow card) 88'; Tadejević (yellow card) 90'	Stadium: Vrapčići Stadium; Attendance: 1,500; Referee: Danijel Pajić (Bijeljina)

14 April 2013 22	Sarajevo	0–0	Leotar	Sarajevo
19:00	Haurdić (yellow card) 22'; Osmanagić (yellow card) 45'; Todorović (yellow card) 56'	Report		Stadium: Asim Ferhatović Hase Stadium; Attendance: 2,500; Referee: Ognjen Valjić (Banja Luka)

21 April 2013 23	Široki Brijeg	2–1	Sarajevo	Široki Brijeg
17:00		Report	Tatomirović (yellow card) 1'; Suljić 29' (yellow card) 45'; Todorović (yellow card) 90'	Stadium: Stadion Pecara; Attendance: 2,500; Referee: Radislav Vukasović (Trebinje)

24 April 2013 24	Sarajevo	1–0	Travnik	Sarajevo
17:00	Torlak 45+1' (yellow card) 85'; Dupovac (yellow card) 48'	Report		Stadium: Asim Ferhatović Hase Stadium; Attendance: 1,100; Referee: Ilija Živković (Orašje)

28 April 2013 25	Borac	1–1	Sarajevo	Banja Luka
16:30		Report	Melunović 11' (yellow card) 21'; Todorović (yellow card) 32'; Haurdić (yellow card) 60'; Suljić (yellow card) 86'	Stadium: Banja Luka City Stadium; Attendance: 4,000; Referee: Tomislav Čuić (Tomislavgrad)

4 May 2013 26	Sarajevo	4–1	Zvijezda	Sarajevo
17:00	Suljić 12'; Hadžić 14'; Tatomirović 19'; Haurdić 33'; Bandović (yellow card) 52'	Report		Stadium: Asim Ferhatović Hase Stadium; Attendance: 1,500; Referee: Dragan Petrović (Banja Luka)

8 May 2013 27	Željezničar	0–0	Sarajevo	Sarajevo
20:00		Report	Suljić (yellow card) 38'; Tadejević (yellow card) 40'; Čomor (yellow card) 84'; Hadžić (yellow card) 88'	Stadium: Stadion Grbavica; Attendance: 8,000; Referee: Danijel Pajić (Bijeljina)

11 May 2013 28	Sarajevo	1–0	Slavija	Sarajevo
17:00	Zlatković (yellow card) 35'; Džakmić 51'; Dupovac (yellow card) 90'	Report		Stadium: Asim Ferhatović Hase Stadium; Attendance: 700; Referee: Goran Paradžik (Ljubuški)

18 May 2013 29	Zrinjski	2–2	Sarajevo	Mostar
17:00		Report	Haurdić 41'; Čomor (yellow card) 45'; Todorović 52'; Mijušković (yellow card) 58'	Stadium: Stadion pod Bijelim Brijegom; Attendance: 1,500; Referee: Danijel Pajić (Bijeljina)

26 May 2013 30	Sarajevo	5–0	Radnik	Sarajevo
17:00	Hadžić 9', 12', 24', 41', 90' (yellow card); Tadejević (yellow card) 30'	Report		Stadium: Asim Ferhatović Hase Stadium; Attendance: 800; Referee: Vladimir Bjelica (I. Sarajevo)

=== Cup of Bosnia and Herzegovina ===
==== Round of 32 ====
18 September 2012	Sarajevo	1–0	Gradina	Sarajevo
19:30	Hadžić	Report		Stadium: Asim Ferhatović Hase Stadium; Attendance: 1,000; Referee: Ognjen Valjić (Banja Luka)

==== Round of 16 ====
3 October 2012 First leg	Zrinjski	3–1	Sarajevo	Mostar
17:00		Report	Nuhanović 82'	Stadium: Stadion pod Bijelim Brijegom; Attendance: 4,500; Referee: Predrag Stankić (Bijeljina)

24 October 2012 Second leg	Sarajevo	2–1 (3–4 agg.)	Zrinjski	Sarajevo
17:00	Hadžić 30', 90'	Report		Stadium: Asim Ferhatović Hase Stadium; Attendance: 3,000; Referee: Dragan Skakić (Gradiška)

=== UEFA Europa League ===
==== First qualifying round ====
5 July 2012 First leg	Sarajevo (Bosnia and Herzegovina)	5–2	(Malta) Hibernians	Sarajevo, Bosnia and Herzegovina
19:30 CEST (UTC+2)	Suljić 2'; Torlak 45+1'; Karamatić 54' (pen.); Čomor (yellow card) 55'; Sesar (yellow card) 55'; Tatomirović (yellow card) 63', (goal) 90'; Hadžić 79'	Report	Farrugia 20'; Soares 33', (red card) 52'; Herrera (yellow card) 45+2'; Dias (yellow card) 49'; Lima (yellow card) 82'	Stadium: Asim Ferhatović Hase Stadium; Attendance: 7,000; Referee: Goran Spirkoski (Macedonia)

12 July 2012 Second leg	Hibernians (Malta)	4–4 (6–9 agg.)	(Bosnia and Herzegovina) Sarajevo	Paola, Malta
19:30 CEST (UTC+2)	Dias 22', 35'; Farrugia 40', 44', (yellow card) 44'; Kristensen (yellow card) 83'	Report	Hadžić 13', 27'; Suljić 23'; Torlak (yellow card) 52'; Šunjevarić 90'	Stadium: Hibernians Ground; Attendance: 700; Referee: Adam Nemeth (Hungary)

==== Second qualifying round ====
19 July 2012 First leg	Levski Sofia (Bulgaria)	1–0	(Bosnia and Herzegovina) Sarajevo	Sofia, Bulgaria
19:00 CEST (UTC+2)	Gadzhev (yellow card) 2'; de Carvalho (yellow card) 65'; Elie (yellow card) 68'; Raykov 72'	Report	Husejinović (yellow card) 23'; Čomor (yellow card) 65'	Stadium: Georgi Asparuhov Stadium; Attendance: 12,500; Referee: Bruno Paixão (Portugal)

26 July 2012 Second leg	Sarajevo (Bosnia and Herzegovina)	3–1 (3–2 agg.)	(Bulgaria) Levski Sofia	Sarajevo, Bosnia and Herzegovina
21:00 CEST (UTC+2)	Husejinović 12', 62'; Suljić 14', (yellow card) 15'; Hadžić (yellow card) 19'; Karamatić (yellow card) 88'	Report	de Carvalho 34' (pen.); Marcinho (yellow card) 43'; Angelov (yellow card) 51'; Starokin (yellow card) 67'; Raykov (yellow card) 74'	Stadium: Asim Ferhatović Hase Stadium; Attendance: 11,000; Referee: Cristian Balaj (Romania)

==== Third qualifying round ====
2 August 2012 First leg	Sarajevo (Bosnia and Herzegovina)	2–1	(Montenegro) Zeta	Sarajevo, Bosnia and Herzegovina
21:00 CEST (UTC+2)	Suljić 17'; Šunjevarić (yellow card) 41'; Belošević 43'	Report	Korać (yellow card) 7'; Radulović (yellow card) 23'; Peličić (yellow card) 31' (red card) 71'; Božović 45', (yellow card) 55'; Novović (yellow card) 90'	Stadium: Asim Ferhatović Hase Stadium; Attendance: 12,259; Referee: Anastassios Kakos (Greece)

9 August 2012 Second leg	Zeta (Montenegro)	1–0 (2–2 (a) agg.)	(Bosnia and Herzegovina) Sarajevo	Podgorica, Montenegro
20:00 CEST (UTC+2)	Burzanović 9'; Radulović (yellow card) 45'; Bulatović (yellow card) 89'	Report	Suljić (yellow card) 69'; Sesar (yellow card) 83'; Čomor (yellow card) 87'	Stadium: Podgorica City Stadium; Attendance: 5,000; Referee: Tommy Skjerven (Norway)

== Statistics ==
Appearances

Rank	Player	Games
1.	(Serbia) Ivan Tatomirović	38+15
2.	(Bosnia and Herzegovina) Emir Hadžić	36+11
3.	(Bosnia and Herzegovina) Asmir Suljić	35+14
4.	(Bosnia and Herzegovina) Amer Dupovac	33+15
5.	(Bosnia and Herzegovina) Dejan Bandović	33+14

Goalscorers

Rank	Player	Goals
1.	(Bosnia and Herzegovina) Emir Hadžić	26+8
2.	(Serbia) Zoran Belošević	9+2
3.	(Bosnia and Herzegovina) Asmir Suljić	7+2
4.	(Bosnia and Herzegovina) Said Husejinović	5+5
5.	(Bosnia and Herzegovina) Sedin Torlak	5+1
