= 2011–12 FK Sarajevo season =

Sarajevo
2011–12 season
- Sporting director: Edim Hadžialagić
- Chairman: Amir Rizvanović
- Manager: Jiří Plíšek; Dragan Jović
- Stadium: Asim Ferhatović Hase Stadium
- Premier League BiH: 4th
- Cup of BiH: Quarter-finals
- UEFA Europa League: Third qualifying round
- Top goalscorer: League: Nermin Haskić (8); All: Nermin Haskić (11)
- Highest home attendance: 13,000 vs Željezničar (12 May 2012)
- Lowest home attendance: 500 vs Rudar (28 September 2011)
- Average home league attendance: 4,294
- Biggest win: Slavija 0–4 Sarajevo (24 August 2011); Sarajevo 4–0 Kozara (10 September 2011)
- Biggest defeat: Sparta 5–0 Sarajevo (28 July 2011)

The 2011–12 Sarajevo season was the club's 63rd season in history, and their 18th consecutive season in the top flight of Bosnian football, the Premier League of BiH. Besides competing in the Premier League, the team competed in the National Cup and the qualifications for UEFA Europa League.

== Squad information ==
=== First-team squad ===
Note: Flags indicate national team as defined under FIFA eligibility rules; some limited exceptions apply. Players may hold more than one non-FIFA nationality.

| No. | Pos. | Nation | Player |
|---|---|---|---|
| 1 | GK | BIH | Ibro Hodžić |
| 1 | GK | BIH | Emir Plakalo |
| 2 | DF | BIH | Amer Dupovac |
| 3 | DF | BIH | Sanel Trebinjac |
| 4 | DF | BIH | Dilaver Zrnanović |
| 5 | MF | BIH | Ivan Sesar |
| 6 | DF | BIH | Sedin Torlak (Captain) |
| 7 | FW | BIH | Haris Handžić |
| 7 | MF | BIH | Said Husejinović |
| 8 | MF | BIH | Semir Bajraktarević |
| 9 | FW | BIH | Emir Obuća (C) |
| 10 | MF | MNE | Damir Kojašević |
| 11 | MF | BIH | Damir Hadžić |
| 11 | FW | BIH | Sulejman Krpić |
| 13 | MF | SRB | Vučina Šćepanović |
| 14 | DF | SRB | Ivan Tatomirović |
| 15 | MF | SRB | Aladin Đakovac |

| No. | Pos. | Nation | Player |
|---|---|---|---|
| 16 | MF | BIH | Ajdin Nuhić |
| 17 | DF | BIH | Denis Čomor |
| 18 | FW | BIH | Nermin Haskić |
| 19 | MF | BIH | Ajdin Maksumić |
| 20 | MF | BIH | Edin Husić |
| 20 | FW | BIH | Almir Šmigalović |
| 21 | DF | SRB | Zoran Belošević |
| 22 | GK | BIH | Dino Hamzić |
| 25 | FW | SEN | Secouba Diatta |
| 25 | DF | BIH | Fadil Čizmić |
| 34 | GK | BIH | Adi Adilović |
| 77 | FW | BIH | Adin Džafić |
| 77 | FW | CRO | Matija Matko |
| 80 | GK | SRB | Đorđe Pantić |
| 88 | MF | BIH | Kenan Handžić |
| 99 | MF | BIH | Faris Handžić |
| 19 99 | MF | BIH | Asmir Suljić |

== Kit ==
| Suppliers | Sponsor |
|---|---|
| (Italy) Royal (Turkey) Lescon | (Bosnia and Herzegovina) AurA |

== Pre-season and friendlies ==
Win Draw Loss Fixtures

| 3 September 2011 Želimir Vidović Cup | Sarajevo (Bosnia and Herzegovina) | 10–0 | (Bosnia and Herzegovina) Dobrinja | Sarajevo |
| | Peljto; Handžić; Nuhić; Fočić; Škoro | | | Stadium: Koševo training ground |

| 5 September 2011 Želimir Vidović Cup | Sarajevo (Bosnia and Herzegovina) | 1–1 (3–4 p) | (Bosnia and Herzegovina) Olimpic | Sarajevo |
| | Handžić | | | Stadium: Asim Ferhatović Hase Stadium |
| | Penalties |
| | Šćepanović (penalty scored); Sesar (penalty scored); Peljto (penalty missed); Hadžić (penalty scored) |

| 1 February 2012 Friendly | Čapljina (Bosnia and Herzegovina) | 2–1 | (Bosnia and Herzegovina) Sarajevo | Čapljina |
| | | | Bajraktarević | Stadium: Stadion Bjelave; Attendance: 50 |

| 15 February 2012 Friendly | Sarajevo (Bosnia and Herzegovina) | 7–1 | (Bosnia and Herzegovina) Travnik | Sarajevo |
| 14:00 | Matko; Čomor; Krpić; Handžić; Haskić | Report | | Stadium: Koševo training ground Attendance: 100 |

| 19 February 2012 Friendly | Sarajevo (Bosnia and Herzegovina) | 3–1 | (Bosnia and Herzegovina) Iskra Bugojno | Sarajevo |
| 14:00 | Šćepanović; Obuća; Krpić | | | Stadium: Koševo training ground Attendance: 500 |

| 23 February 2012 Friendly | Mura (Slovenia) | 1–3 | (Bosnia and Herzegovina) Sarajevo | Opatija, Croatia |
| | | | Krpić; Torlak; Bajraktarević |

| 25 February 2012 Friendly | Opatija (Croatia) | 3–1 | (Bosnia and Herzegovina) Sarajevo | Opatija, Croatia |
| | | | Haskić |

| 25 February 2012 Friendly | Triglav Kranj (Slovenia) | 1–2 | (Bosnia and Herzegovina) Sarajevo | Opatija, Croatia |
| | | | Obuća; Tatomirović |

| 28 February 2012 Friendly | Rijeka (Croatia) | 1–1 | (Bosnia and Herzegovina) Sarajevo | Rijeka, Croatia |
| 17:00 | | Report | Krpić | Stadium: Stadion Kantrida |

| 3 March 2012 Friendly | Sarajevo (Bosnia and Herzegovina) | 0–0 | (Bosnia and Herzegovina) Olimpic | Sarajevo |
| 15:00 | | Report | | Stadium: Koševo training ground Attendance: 1,000; Referee: Hamid Lindov |

| 15 March 2012 Friendly | Sarajevo (Bosnia and Herzegovina) | 3–1 | (Bosnia and Herzegovina) UNIS Vogošća | Sarajevo |
| | Krpić 10'; Matko 45'; Haskić 75' | | | Stadium: Koševo training ground |

| 2 April 2012 Friendly | Travnik (Bosnia and Herzegovina) | 1–2 | (Bosnia and Herzegovina) Sarajevo | Travnik |
| | | | Čiva; Haskić | Stadium: Stadion Pirota |

== Competitions ==
=== Overview ===
| Competition | First match | Last match | Starting round | Final position | Record | | | | | | | |
| Competition | First match | Last match | Starting round | Final position | Pld | W | D | L | GF | GA | GD | Win % |
|---|---|---|---|---|---|---|---|---|---|---|---|---|
| Premier League | 7 August 2011 | 23 May 2012 | Matchday 1 | 4th | 30 | 16 | 6 | 8 | 48 | 31 | +17 | 53.33 |
| Cup of BiH | 14 September 2011 | 23 November 2011 | Round of 32 | Quarter-finals | 5 | 2 | 2 | 1 | 8 | 5 | +3 | 40.00 |
| Europa League | 14 July 2011 | 4 August 2011 | Second qualifying round | Third qualifying round | 4 | 1 | 1 | 2 | 2 | 7 | −5 | 25.00 |
| Total | | | | | 39 | 19 | 9 | 11 | 58 | 43 | +15 | 48.72 |

Source: Competitions

=== Premier League ===
==== League table ====
| Pos | Team | Pld | W | D | L | GF | GA | GD | Pts | Qualification or relegation |
|---|---|---|---|---|---|---|---|---|---|---|
| 2 | Široki Brijeg | 30 | 18 | 9 | 3 | 48 | 17 | +31 | 63 | Qualification to Europa League second qualifying round (Note: As Željezničar also won the national cup, their slot as the cup winner was taken by the second-placed team in the league, Široki Brijeg. As Široki Brijeg was also the runner-up in the cup, the fourth placed team on the league table also qualified for UEFA Europa League.) |
| 3 | Borac Banja Luka | 30 | 17 | 4 | 9 | 46 | 26 | +20 | 55 | Qualification to Europa League first qualifying round |
| 4 | Sarajevo | 30 | 16 | 6 | 8 | 48 | 31 | +17 | 54 | Qualification to Europa League first qualifying round |
| 5 | Olimpic | 30 | 15 | 7 | 8 | 44 | 23 | +21 | 52 | |
| 6 | Zrinjski | 30 | 12 | 9 | 9 | 47 | 41 | +6 | 45 | |

Source: SportSport.ba (in Bosnian)
Rules for classification: 1st points; 2nd goal difference; 3rd goals scored
For deciding champions, qualification to UEFA Europa League and relegation: 1st points; 2nd head-to-head points; 3rd head-to-head goal difference; 4th head-to-head goals scored; 5th head-to-head away goals scored; 6th goal difference; 7th goals scored

==== Results summary ====
| Overall | | | | | | | | Home | | | | | | Away | | | | | |
| Pld | W | D | L | GF | GA | GD | Pts | W | D | L | GF | GA | GD | W | D | L | GF | GA | GD |
|---|---|---|---|---|---|---|---|---|---|---|---|---|---|---|---|---|---|---|---|
| 30 | 16 | 6 | 8 | 48 | 31 | +17 | 54 | 10 | 3 | 2 | 29 | 15 | +14 | 6 | 3 | 6 | 19 | 16 | +3 |

Source: Sportsport.ba

==== Results by round ====
| Round | 1 | 2 | 3 | 4 | 5 | 6 | 7 | 8 | 9 | 10 | 11 | 12 | 13 | 14 | 15 | 16 | 17 | 18 | 19 | 20 | 21 | 22 | 23 | 24 | 25 | 26 | 27 | 28 | 29 | 30 |
|---|---|---|---|---|---|---|---|---|---|---|---|---|---|---|---|---|---|---|---|---|---|---|---|---|---|---|---|---|---|---|
| Ground | H | A | H | A | H | H | A | H | A | H | A | H | A | H | A | A | H | A | H | A | A | H | A | H | A | H | A | H | A | H |
| Result | W | W | D | W | W | W | L | L | W | W | D | W | L | W | L | W | L | D | W | D | W | W | L | W | W | W | L | D | L | D |
| Position | 1 | 1 | 1 | 1 | 1 | 1 | 1 | 2 | 2 | 2 | 3 | 3 | 3 | 3 | 3 | 3 | 3 | 3 | 3 | 4 | 3 | 3 | 3 | 3 | 3 | 3 | 3 | 3 | 4 | 4 |

Source: Competitions
A = Away; H = Home; W = Win; D = Draw; L = Loss

==== Matches ====
| 7 August 2011 1 | Sarajevo | 2–1 | Sloboda | Sarajevo |
| 18:00 | Denis Čomor (yellow card); Emir Obuća; Kenan Handžić (yellow card); Damir Kojašević 68'; Almir Šmigalović (yellow card) | Report | | Stadium: Asim Ferhatović Hase Stadium; Attendance: 3,500; Referee: Dragan Skakić (B. Gradiška) |

| 14 August 2011 2 | GOŠK | 1–4 | Sarajevo | Čitluk |
| 17:00 | | | Damir Kojašević 28'; Kenan Handžić (yellow card); Asmir Suljić 55'; Nermin Haskić 62'; Emir Obuća 87'; Ajdin Maksumić (yellow card) | Stadium: Stadion Bare; Attendance: 1,500; Referee: Robert Zrilić (Banja Luka) |

| 20 August 2011 3 | Sarajevo | 1–1 | Velež | Sarajevo |
| 21:00 | Asmir Suljić 4'; Vučina Šćepanović (yellow card) 8'; Emir Obuća (yellow card) 56'; Zoran Belošević (yellow card) 87' | Report | | Stadium: Asim Ferhatović Hase Stadium; Attendance: 6,000; Referee: Vladimir Dominković (Orašje) |

| 24 August 2011 4 | Slavija | 0–4 | Sarajevo | Istočno Sarajevo |
| 17:00 | | Report | Adi Adilović (yellow card); Vučina Šćepanović (yellow card) 37'; Nermin Haskić 42'; Vučina Šćepanović 45+4' 64'; Damir Kojašević (yellow card) 70'; Sedin Torlak 84'; Damir Hadžić (yellow card) 85'; Ajdin Maksumić (yellow card) 87' | Stadium: Gradski SRC Slavija; Attendance: 2,300; Referee: Tomislav Čuić (Tomislavgrad) |

| 27 August 2011 5 | Sarajevo | 4–2 | Čelik | Sarajevo |
| 21:00 | Damir Kojašević 6' (yellow card); Semir Bajraktarević (yellow card); Vučina Šćepanović (yellow card); Asmir Suljić (yellow card); Emir Obuća 38'; Own goal 80'; Damir Kojašević 90+4' | Report | | Stadium: Asim Ferhatović Hase Stadium; Attendance: 6,500; Referee: Semir Kaplan (Stolac) |

| 10 September 2011 6 | Sarajevo | 4–0 | Kozara | Sarajevo |
| 19:00 | Denis Čomor (yellow card); Semir Bajraktarević 34' (yellow card); Asmir Suljić 69'; Damir Kojašević 71'; Sedin Torlak 87' | | | Stadium: Asim Ferhatović Hase Stadium; Attendance: 2,500; Referee: Midhat Arnautović (Tuzla) |

| 17 September 2011 7 | Leotar | 1–0 | Sarajevo | Trebinje |
| 16:00 | | | Dilaver Zrnanović (yellow card) | Stadium: Stadion Police; Attendance: 600; Referee: Goran Paradžik (Ljubuški) |

| 24 September 2011 8 | Sarajevo | 0–1 | Široki Brijeg | Sarajevo |
| 19:00 | Denis Čomor (yellow card); Emir Obuća (yellow card); Ajdin Maksumić (yellow card) | http://fksinfo.com/galerija/8-kolo-plbih-sarajevo---siroki-brijeg/321/slika#12583 FKSinfo | | Stadium: Asim Ferhatović Hase Stadium; Attendance: 5,500; Referee: Robert Zrilić (Banja Luka) |

| 1 October 2011 9 | Rudar Prijedor | 1–2 | Sarajevo | Prijedor |
| 15:30 | | Report | Nermin Haskić 45'; Emir Obuća 56'; Kenan Handžić (yellow card); Adin Džafić (yellow card); Dilaver Zrnanović (yellow card) | Stadium: Gradski stadion (Prijedor); Attendance: 1,400; Referee: Darko Obradović (Stolac) |

| 15 October 2011 10 | Sarajevo | 1–0 | Travnik | Sarajevo |
| 15:00 | Denis Čomor (yellow card) 26'; Emir Obuća 59' | Report | | Stadium: Asim Ferhatović Hase Stadium; Attendance: 2,500; Referee: Eldis Prošić (Cazin) |

| 23 October 2011 11 | Zrinjski | 1–1 | Sarajevo | Mostar |
| 17:00 | | Report | Nermin Haskić 66'; Dilaver Zrnanović (yellow card); Denis Čomor (yellow card) | Stadium: Stadion pod Bijelim Brijegom; Attendance: 0 Referee: Danijel Pajić (Bijeljina) |

| 29 October 2011 12 | Sarajevo | 2–0 | Olimpic | Sarajevo |
| 17:30 | Emir Obuća 48' 65'; Zoran Belošević (yellow card) | Report | | Stadium: Asim Ferhatović Hase Stadium; Attendance: 3,000; Referee: Midhat Arnautović (Tuzla) |

| 5 November 2011 13 | Željezničar | 1–0 | Sarajevo | Sarajevo |
| 17:00 | | Report | Denis Čomor (yellow card); Ivan Sesar (yellow card); Asmir Suljić (yellow card); Denis Čomor (yellow card) (red card) 72' | Stadium: Grbavica Stadium; Attendance: 12,000; Referee: Tomislav Čuić (Tomislavgrad) |

| 19 November 2011 14 | Sarajevo | 3–2 | Zvijezda Gradačac | Sarajevo |
| 13:30 | Nermin Haskić 41'; Amer Dupovac (yellow card) 46'; Nermin Haskić 56'; Semir Bajraktarević 83' (yellow card); Sanel Trebinjac (yellow card) 88' | Report | | Stadium: Asim Ferhatović Hase Stadium; Attendance: 1,500; Referee: Eldis Prošić (Cazin) |

| 26 November 2011 15 | Borac | 2–0 | Sarajevo | Banja Luka |
| 16:00 | | | Ivan Sesar (yellow card); Vučina Šćepanović (yellow card) | Stadium: Banja Luka City Stadium; Attendance: 3,500; Referee: Darko Obradović (Stolac) |

| 11 March 2012 16 | Sloboda | 0–1 | Sarajevo | Tuzla |
| 14:30 | | Report | Sedin Torlak 73'; Zoran Belošević (yellow card); Amer Dupovac (yellow card) | Stadium: Stadion Tušanj; Attendance: 2,500; Referee: Vladimir Bjelica (I. Sarajevo) |

| 18 March 2012 17 | Sarajevo | 0–2 | GOŠK | Sarajevo |
| 15:00 | Denis Čomor (yellow card); Vučina Šćepanović (yellow card); Matija Matko (red card) 78' | Report | | Stadium: Asim Ferhatović Hase Stadium; Attendance: 5,000; Referee: Muamer Bureković (Zenica) |

| 25 March 2012 18 | Velež | 0–0 | Sarajevo | Mostar |
| 15:00 | | Report | Asmir Suljić (yellow card) 84' | Stadium: Vrapčići Stadium; Attendance: 2,500; Referee: Edin Jakupović (Bihać) |

| 1 April 2012 19 | Sarajevo | 2–1 | Slavija | Sarajevo |
| 15:30 | Own goal 50'; Nermin Haskić 65'; Asmir Suljić (yellow card); Denis Čomor (yellow card) | Report | | Stadium: Asim Ferhatović Hase Stadium; Attendance: 2,000; Referee: Darko Obradović (Stolac) |

| 7 April 2012 20 | Čelik | 1–1 | Sarajevo | Zenica |
| 19:00 | | Report | Asmir Suljić 57'; Zoran Belošević (yellow card); Edin Husić (yellow card) | Stadium: Bilino Polje Stadium; Attendance: 2,000; Referee: Danijel Pajić (Bijeljina) |

| 11 April 2012 21 | Kozara | 1–3 | Sarajevo | Gradiška |
| 16:00 | | Report | Matija Matko 20' (yellow card); Ivan Tatomirović 86'; Asmir Suljić 90+2'; Denis Čomor (yellow card); Vučina Šćepanović (yellow card) | Stadium: Gradski stadion (Gradiška); Attendance: 1,000; Referee: Ilija Živković (Orašje) |

| 14 April 2012 22 | Sarajevo | 1–0 | Leotar | Sarajevo |
| 16:00 | Edin Husić 21'; Said Husejinović (yellow card) | Report | | Stadium: Asim Ferhatović Hase Stadium; Attendance: 1,500; Referee: Goran Paradžik (Ljubuški) |

| 21 April 2012 23 | Široki Brijeg | 3–1 | Sarajevo | Široki Brijeg |
| 16:30 | | Report | Said Husejinović 63'; Sedin Torlak (yellow card); Vučina Šćepanović (yellow card); Denis Čomor (yellow card) | Stadium: Stadion Pecara; Attendance: 800; Referee: Danijel Pajić (Bijeljina) |

| 28 April 2012 24 | Sarajevo | 3–1 | Rudar Prijedor | Sarajevo |
| 19:30 | Sanel Trebinjac 11'; Nermin Haskić 14'; Edin Husić 45+2' (yellow card); Zoran Belošević (yellow card) | Report | | Stadium: Asim Ferhatović Hase Stadium; Attendance: 2,000; Referee: Semir Kaplan (Stolac) |

| 2 May 2012 25 | Travnik | 1–2 | Sarajevo | Travnik |
| 17:00 | | | Nermin Haskić (yellow card); Dilaver Zrnanović (yellow card) 62'; Asmir Suljić (yellow card) 66'; Sedin Torlak (yellow card) (goal) 75'; Sulejman Krpić 82' | Stadium: Stadion Pirota; Attendance: 1,500; Referee: Ognjen Valjić (Banja Luka) |

| 6 May 2012 26 | Sarajevo | 2–0 | Zrinjski | Sarajevo |
| 20:00 | Sulejman Krpić 41'; Said Husejinović 45'; Edin Husić (yellow card) 58'; Ivan Sesar (yellow card) 73' | Report | | Stadium: Asim Ferhatović Hase Stadium; Attendance: 4,000; Referee: Radislav Vukasović (Trebinje) |

| 9 May 2012 27 | Olimpic | 1–0 | Sarajevo | Sarajevo |
| 17:00 | | Report | Ivan Tatomirović (yellow card); Denis Čomor (yellow card); Sanel Trebinjac (yellow card); Asmir Suljić (yellow card) | Stadium: Stadion Otoka; Attendance: 2,500; Referee: Ognjen Valjić (Banja Luka) |

| 12 May 2012 28 | Sarajevo | 2–2 | Željezničar | Sarajevo |
| 17:00 | Zoran Belošević 9' (yellow card) 87'; Said Husejinović 30' (yellow card) 36'; Dilaver Zrnanović (yellow card) 53'; Ivan Sesar (yellow card) 80'; Denis Čomor (yellow card) 90+2' | Report | | Stadium: Asim Ferhatović Hase Stadium; Attendance: 12,500; Referee: Edin Jakupović (Bihać) |

| 20 May 2012 29 | Zvijezda Gradačac | 2–0 | Sarajevo | Gradačac |
| 17:00 | | | Asmir Suljić (yellow card); Denis Čomor (yellow card); Sedin Torlak (yellow card) | Stadium: Banja Ilidža (Gradačac); Attendance: 1,500; Referee: Radislav Vukasović (Trebinje) |

| 23 May 2012 30 | Sarajevo | 2–2 | Borac | Sarajevo |
| 17:00 | Said Husejinović 13'; Zoran Belošević 30' | Report | | Stadium: Asim Ferhatović Hase Stadium; Attendance: 1,000; Referee: Darko Obradović (Stolac) |

=== Cup of Bosnia and Herzegovina ===
==== Round of 32 ====
| 14 September 2011 | Sloga Doboj | 0–1 | Sarajevo | Doboj |
| 16:00 | | | Hadžić | Stadium: Gradski stadion Luke (Doboj); Attendance: 2,000 |

==== Round of 16 ====
| 28 September 2011 First leg | Sarajevo | 3–0 | Rudar Prijedor | Sarajevo |
| 15:30 | Džafić 1'; Kojašević (penalty scored); Obuća 65'; Handžić (yellow card) | | | Stadium: Asim Ferhatović Hase Stadium; Attendance: 500; Referee: Vladimir Dominković (Orašje) |

| 19 October 2011 Second leg | Rudar Prijedor | 5–4 (5–7 agg.) | Sarajevo | Prijedor |
| 15:00 | | | Obuća 13'; Šćepanović 53'; Suljić 88' | Stadium: Prijedor City Stadium; Attendance: 350 |

==== Quarter-finals ====
| 2 November 2011 First leg | Sarajevo | 0–0 | Borac | Sarajevo |
| 17:30 | Bajraktarević (yellow card) | Report | | Stadium: Asim Ferhatović Hase Stadium; Attendance: 1,500; Referee: Vladimir Dominković (Orašje) |

| 23 November 2011 Second leg | Borac | 0–0 (0–0 agg.) (6–5 p) | Sarajevo | Banja Luka |
| 16:00 | | Report | Kojašević (yellow card); Handžić (yellow card); Haskić (yellow card) | Stadium: Banja Luka City Stadium; Attendance: 3,000; Referee: Tomislav Čuić (Tomislavgrad) |
| | Penalties |
| | | | (penalty scored) Torlak; (penalty missed) Sesar; (penalty scored) Belošević; (penalty missed) Bajraktarević; (penalty scored) Handžić; (penalty scored) Zrnanović; (penalty scored) Haskić; (penalty missed) Čomor |

=== UEFA Europa League ===
==== Second qualifying round ====
| 14 July 2011 First leg | Örebro (Sweden) | 0–0 | (Bosnia and Herzegovina) Sarajevo | Örebro, Sweden |
| 19:00 CEST (UTC+2) | | Report | Šćepanović (yellow card) 14'; Dupovac (yellow card) 50'; Belošević (yellow card) 60' | Stadium: Behrn Arena; Attendance: 5,529; Referee: Jérôme Efong Nzolo (Belgium) |

| 21 July 2011 Second leg | Sarajevo (Bosnia and Herzegovina) | 2–0 (2–0 agg.) | (Sweden) Örebro | Sarajevo, Bosnia and Herzegovina |
| 19:00 CEST (UTC+2) | Dupovac (yellow card) 30'; Obuća (penalty missed) 45+1', (yellow card) 55'; Haskić 46', 62', (yellow card) 58'; v (yellow card) 73'; Bajraktarević (yellow card) 90+3' | Report | | Stadium: Asim Ferhatović Hase Stadium; Attendance: 10,527; Referee: Ruddy Buquet (France) |

==== Third qualifying round ====
| 28 July 2011 First leg | Sparta Prague (Czech Republic) | 5–0 | (Bosnia and Herzegovina) Sarajevo | Prague, Czech Republic |
| 19:00 CEST (UTC+2) | Kweuke 5', 69', 90+3'; Sionko 36'; Podaný 90+1' | Report | Maksumić (yellow card) 77' | Stadium: Generali Arena; Attendance: 11,626; Referee: Alexandru Deaconu (Romania) |

| 4 August 2011 Second leg | Sarajevo (Bosnia and Herzegovina) | 0–2 (0–7 agg.) | (Czech Republic) Sparta Prague | Sarajevo, Bosnia and Herzegovina |
| 21:00 CEST (UTC+2) | Handžić (yellow card) 18'; Belošević (yellow card) 33' (yellow-red card) 52'; Haskić (yellow card) 82' | Report | | Stadium: Asim Ferhatović Hase Stadium; Attendance: 5,500; Referee: Maksim Layushkin (Russia) |

== Statistics ==
Appearances

| Rank | Player | Games |
|---|---|---|
| 1. | (Bosnia and Herzegovina) Nermin Haskić | 39+8 |
| 2. | (Serbia) Zoran Belošević | 35+9 |
| 3. | (Bosnia and Herzegovina) Denis Čomor | 34+3 |
| 4. | (Bosnia and Herzegovina) Asmir Suljić | 33+8 |

Goalscorers

| Rank | Player | Goals |
|---|---|---|
| 1. | (Bosnia and Herzegovina) Nermin Haskić | 11+4 |
| 2. | (Bosnia and Herzegovina) Emir Obuća | 10+2 |
| 3. | (Bosnia and Herzegovina) Asmir Suljić | 7 |
| 4. | (Montenegro) Damir Kojašević | 6 |
