= 2010–11 FK Sarajevo season =

Sarajevo
2010–11 season
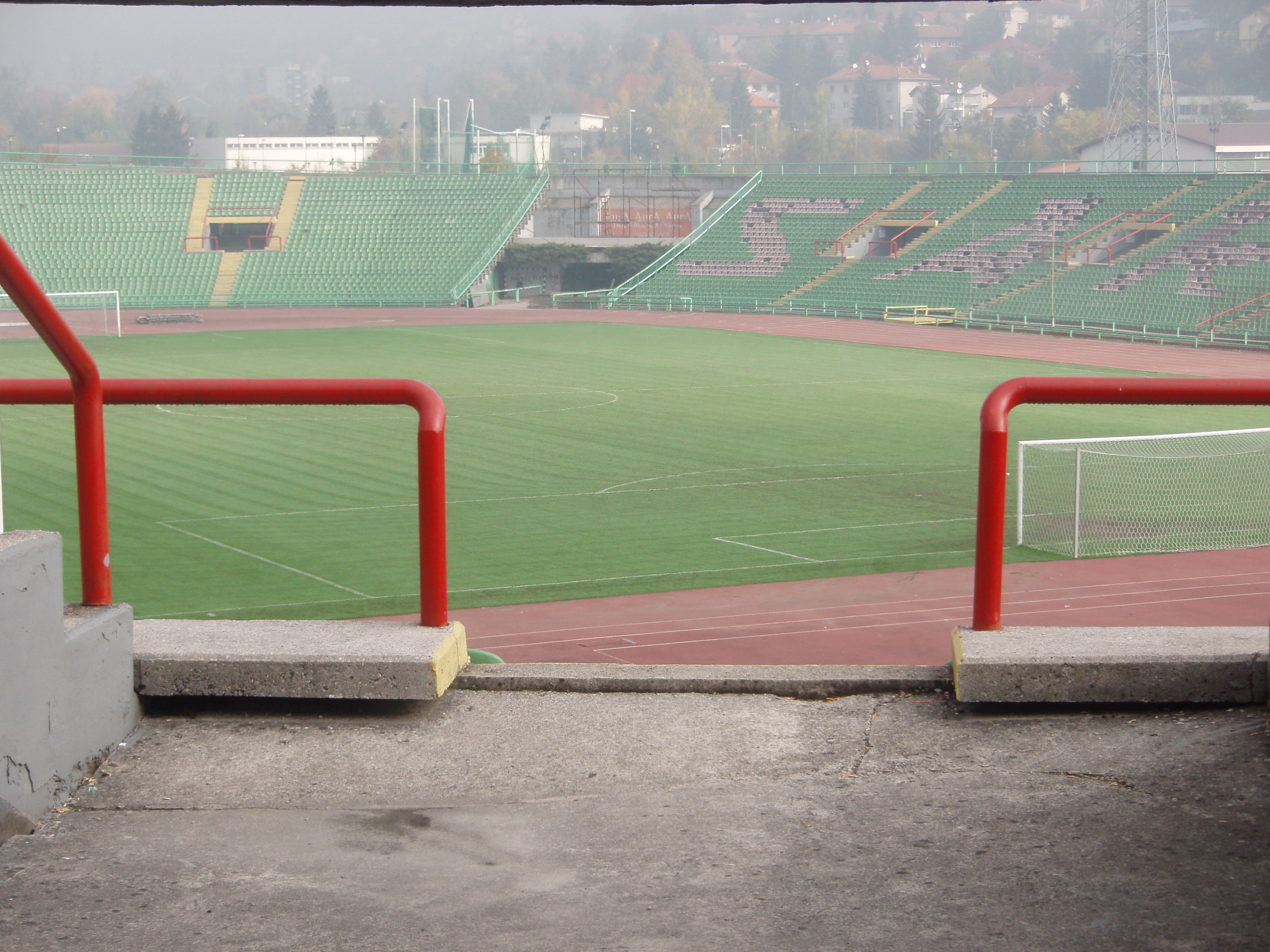
- Stadion Koševo - panoramio 23.10.2010.
- Sporting director: Senad Merdanović; Edin Prljača; Edim Hadžialagić
- Chairman: Zijad Blekić; Amir Rizvanović
- Manager: Mirza Varešanović
- Stadium: Asim Ferhatović Hase Stadium
- Premier League BiH: 2nd
- Cup of BiH: Quarter-finals
- Top goalscorer: League: Emir Obuća (8); All: Alen Avdić (8) (North Macedonia) Adis Jahović 8
- Highest home attendance: 15,000 vs Željezničar (7 May 2011)
- Lowest home attendance: 1,000 vs Zvijezda (30 April 2011)
- Average home league attendance: 3,938
- Biggest win: Drina 0–5 Sarajevo (22 May 2011)
- Biggest defeat: Zrinjski 4–2 Sarajevo (20 March 2011)

The 2010–11 Sarajevo season was the club's 62nd season in history, and their 17th consecutive season in the top flight of Bosnian football, the Premier League of BiH. Besides competing in the Premier League, the team competed in the National Cup

== Squad information ==
=== First-team squad ===
Note: Flags indicate national team as defined under FIFA eligibility rules; some limited exceptions apply. Players may hold more than one non-FIFA nationality.

No.	Pos.	Nation	Player
1	GK	BIH	Muhamed Alaim (C)
1	GK	BIH	Ibro Hodžić
2	DF	BIH	Amer Dupovac
3	MF	BIH	Damir Hadžić
5	DF	MNE	Hilmo Gutić
6	DF	BIH	Sedin Torlak
7	MF	BIH	Faruk Ihtijarević
7	FW	BIH	Emir Obuća
8	MF	BIH	Veldin Muharemović
9	FW	BIH	Alen Avdić
10	MF	MNE	Damir Kojašević
11	FW	BIH	Jasmin Čampara
12	GK	SRB	Bojan Jović
13	MF	SRB	Vučina Šćepanović
14	MF	BIH	Muhamed Džakmić (Captain)
15	MF	BIH	Nail Šehović
16	MF	BIH	Ajdin Nuhić

No.	Pos.	Nation	Player
18	FW	MKD	Adis Jahović
77 13 11 19	MF	BIH	Asmir Suljić
20	DF	SRB	Branislav Arsenijević
21	DF	SRB	Zoran Belošević
22	GK	BIH	Dino Hamzić
23	FW	BIH	Almir Pliska
27	MF	BIH	Edin Pehlić
27	FW	BIH	Amel Handžić
33	DF	BIH	Sanel Trebinjac
38	DF	BIH	Edin Čakal
50	MF	BIH	Nedim Bećirević
74	MF	BIH	Dženaldin Hamzagić
77	FW	BIH	Haris Handžić
87	DF	BIH	Denis Čomor
88	MF	BIH	Kenan Handžić (Captain)
—	DF	SRB	Mirko Todorović
—	MF	BRA	Juninho Botelho

== Kit ==
Suppliers	Sponsor
(United States) Nike (Italy) Legea	(Bosnia and Herzegovina) AurA

== Competitions ==
=== Overview ===
Competition	First match	Last match	Starting round	Final position	Record							
Competition	First match	Last match	Starting round	Final position	Pld	W	D	L	GF	GA	GD	Win %
Premier League	8 August 2010	28 May 2011	Matchday 1	2nd	30	17	6	7	51	26	+25	56.67
Cup of BiH	15 September 2010	10 November 2010	First round	Quarter-finals	5	3	1	1	11	6	+5	60.00
Total					35	20	7	8	62	32	+30	57.14

Source: Competitions

=== Premier League ===
==== League table ====
Pos	Team	Pld	W	D	L	GF	GA	GD	Pts	Qualification or relegation
1	Borac Banja Luka (C)	30	19	7	4	37	15	+22	64	Qualification to Champions League second qualifying round
2	Sarajevo	30	17	6	7	51	26	+25	57	Qualification to Europa League second qualifying round (Note: Željezničar have won the 2010–11 Bosnian Cup and therefore qualified for the second qualifying round of the 2011–12 UEFA Europa League.)
3	Željezničar	30	17	4	9	50	25	+25	55	Qualification to Europa League second qualifying round
4	Široki Brijeg	30	16	2	12	59	45	+14	50	Qualification to Europa League first qualifying round
5	Olimpic	30	14	6	10	35	33	+2	48	

Source: RSSSF
Rules for classification: 1st points; 2nd goal difference; 3rd goals scored
For deciding champions, qualification to UEFA Europa League and relegation: 1st points; 2nd head-to-head points; 3rd head-to-head goal difference; 4th head-to-head goals scored; 5th head-to-head away goals scored; 6th goal difference; 7th goals scored
(C) Champions

==== Results summary ====
Overall								Home						Away					
Pld	W	D	L	GF	GA	GD	Pts	W	D	L	GF	GA	GD	W	D	L	GF	GA	GD
30	17	6	7	51	26	+25	57	12	2	1	30	7	+23	5	4	6	21	19	+2

Source: Sportsport.ba

==== Results by round ====
Round	1	2	3	4	5	6	7	8	9	10	11	12	13	14	15	16	17	18	19	20	21	22	23	24	25	26	27	28	29	30
Ground	H	A	H	H	A	H	A	H	A	H	A	H	A	H	A	A	H	A	A	H	A	H	A	H	A	H	A	H	A	H
Result	W	L	W	W	W	L	D	W	D	W	D	W	L	D	W	L	W	D	L	W	L	W	L	W	W	D	W	W	W	W
Position	5	9	3	1	1	2	2	2	3	2	2	2	3	3	3	3	3	3	3	3	3	3	3	3	3	3	3	3	3	2

Source: Competitions
A = Away; H = Home; W = Win; D = Draw; L = Loss

==== Matches ====
8 August 2010 2	Slavija	2–1	Sarajevo	Istočno Sarajevo
17:30		Report	Arsenijević 74'; Hadžić (yellow card); Suljić (yellow card); Todorović (yellow card) 82'	Stadium: City Stadium SRC Slavija; Attendance: 3,000

14 August 2010 3	Sarajevo	3–0	Sloboda	Sarajevo
19:00	Torlak 49'; Arsenijević 55' (pen.); Jahović 90'	Report		Stadium: Asim Ferhatović Hase Stadium; Attendance: 6,000

18 August 2010 1	Sarajevo	1–0	Čelik	Sarajevo
		Report		Stadium: Asim Ferhatović Hase Stadium; Attendance: 7,000

21 August 2010 4	Sarajevo	1–0	Zrinjski	Sarajevo
		Report		Stadium: Asim Ferhatović Hase Stadium; Attendance: 6,500

28 August 2010 5	Budućnost	1–2	Sarajevo	Banovići
		Report		Stadium: Banovići City Stadium; Attendance: 3,500

12 September 2010 6	Sarajevo	0–1	Borac	Sarajevo
		Report		Stadium: Asim Ferhatović Hase Stadium; Attendance: 7,000

18 September 2010 7	Rudar Prijedor	1–1	Sarajevo	Prijedor
		Report		Stadium: Prijedor City Stadium; Attendance: 2,500

26 September 2010 8	Sarajevo	3–1	Olimpic	Sarajevo
		Report		Stadium: Asim Ferhatović Hase Stadium; Attendance: 3,000

5 October 2010 9	Zvijezda	1–1	Sarajevo	Gradačac
		Report		Stadium: Banja Ilidža; Attendance: 3,500

16 October 2010 10	Sarajevo	1–0	Travnik	Sarajevo
		Report		Stadium: Asim Ferhatović Hase Stadium; Attendance: 1,500

24 October 2010 11	Željezničar	0–0	Sarajevo	Sarajevo
		Report		Stadium: Grbavica Stadium; Attendance: 8,500

30 October 2010 12	Sarajevo	3–0	Leotar	Sarajevo
		Report		Stadium: Asim Ferhatović Hase Stadium; Attendance: 4,000

7 November 2010 13	Široki Brijeg	2–1	Sarajevo	Široki Brijeg
		Report		Stadium: Pecara Stadium; Attendance: 2,000

13 November 2010 14	Sarajevo	1–1	Drina	Sarajevo
		Report		Stadium: Asim Ferhatović Hase Stadium; Attendance: 1,500

20 November 2010 15	Velež	1–2	Sarajevo	Mostar
		Report		Stadium: Vrapčići Stadium; Attendance: 500

26 February 2011 16	Čelik	2–1	Sarajevo	Zenica
		Report		Stadium: Bilino Polje Stadium; Attendance: 5,000

5 March 2011 17	Sarajevo	4–2	Slavija	Sarajevo
		Report		Stadium: Asim Ferhatović Hase Stadium; Attendance: 3,500

12 March 2011 18	Sloboda	0–0	Sarajevo	Tuzla
		Report		Stadium: Tušanj City Stadium; Attendance: 4,500

20 March 2011 19	Zrinjski	4–2	Sarajevo	Mostar
		Report		Stadium: Bijeli Brijeg Stadium; Attendance: 2,000

2 April 2011 20	Sarajevo	2–0	Budućnost	Sarajevo
		Report		Stadium: Asim Ferhatović Hase Stadium; Attendance: 1,500

9 April 2011 21	Borac	2–0	Sarajevo	Banja Luka
		Report		Stadium: Banja Luka City Stadium; Attendance: 9,000

16 April 2011 22	Sarajevo	5–1	Rudar Prijedor	Sarajevo
		Report		Stadium: Asim Ferhatović Hase Stadium; Attendance: 2,000

23 April 2011 23	Olimpic	2–1	Sarajevo	Sarajevo
		Report		Stadium: Asim Ferhatović Hase Stadium; Attendance: 4,000

30 April 2011 24	Sarajevo	2–1	Zvijezda	Sarajevo
		Report		Stadium: Asim Ferhatović Hase Stadium; Attendance: 2,000

4 May 2011 25	Travnik	1–2	Sarajevo	Travnik
		Report		Stadium: Pirota Stadium; Attendance: 1,000

7 May 2011 26	Sarajevo	0–0	Željezničar	Sarajevo
		Report		Stadium: Asim Ferhatović Hase Stadium; Attendance: 15,000

14 May 2011 27	Leotar	0–2	Sarajevo	Trebinje
		Report		Stadium: Police Stadium; Attendance: 400

19 May 2011 28	Sarajevo	3–0	Široki Brijeg	Sarajevo
		Report		Stadium: Asim Ferhatović Hase Stadium; Attendance: 5,000

22 May 2011 29	Drina	0–5	Sarajevo	Zvornik
		Report		Stadium: Zvornik City Stadium; Attendance: 500

28 May 2011 30	Sarajevo	1–0	Velež	Sarajevo
		Report		Stadium: Asim Ferhatović Hase Stadium; Attendance: 1,500

=== Cup of Bosnia and Herzegovina ===
==== Round of 32 ====
15 September 2010	Sarajevo	2–1	Sloga Gornji Vakuf-Uskoplje	Sarajevo
16:00 CEST (UTC+2)		Report		Stadium: Asim Ferhatović Hase Stadium; Attendance: 800

==== Round of 16 ====
29 September 2010 First leg	Sarajevo	4–1	Sloboda Novi Grad	Sarajevo
15:30 CEST (UTC+2)		Report		Stadium: Asim Ferhatović Hase Stadium; Attendance: 500

20 October 2010 Second leg	Sloboda Novi Grad	1–3 (2–7 agg.)	Sarajevo	Novi Grad
14:30 CEST (UTC+2)		Report		Stadium: Mlakve Stadium; Attendance: 500

==== Quarter-finals ====
3 November 2010 First leg	Sarajevo	2–2	Široki Brijeg	Sarajevo
17:00 CET (UTC+1)		Report		Stadium: Asim Ferhatović Hase Stadium; Attendance: 3,000

10 November 2010 Second leg	Široki Brijeg	1–0 (3–2 agg.)	Sarajevo	Široki Brijeg
15:00 CET (UTC+1)		Report		Stadium: Pecara Stadium; Attendance: 1,000

== Statistics ==
Appearances

Rank	Player	Games
1.	(Bosnia and Herzegovina) Alen Avdić	31
2.	(Serbia) Branislav Arsenijević	30
3.	(Bosnia and Herzegovina) Sedin Torlak	30
4.	(Montenegro) Damir Kojašević	29
5.	(Serbia) Vučina Šćepanović	28

Goalscorers

Rank	Player	Goals
1.	(Bosnia and Herzegovina) Alen Avdić	8
2.	(Bosnia and Herzegovina) Emir Obuća	8
3.	(North Macedonia) Adis Jahović	8
4.	(Serbia) Branislav Arsenijević	6
5.	(Serbia) Vučina Šćepanović	5
