= 2012–13 GNK Dinamo Zagreb season =

Dinamo Zagreb
2012–13 season
- Chairman: Mirko Barišić
- Manager: Ante Čačić (until 26 November 2012); Krunoslav Jurčić (from 26 November 2012)
- Prva HNL: 1st (15th title)
- Croatian Cup: Second round (eliminated by Zadar)
- UEFA Champions League: Group stage
- Top goalscorer: League: Sammir (12); All: Duje Čop; Sammir (12)
- Highest home attendance: 25,000 (vs Ludogorets Razgrad, 25 July 2012)
- Lowest home attendance: 500 (vs Zadar, 30 October 2012)
Home colours	Away colours	Third colours

This article shows statistics of individual players for the football club Dinamo Zagreb. It also lists all matches that Dinamo Zagreb played in the 2012–13 season.

Dinamo Zagreb finished first in the league standings to become league champions.

== First-team squad ==
As of 31 January 2013

=== First team squad ===
Note: Flags indicate national team as defined under FIFA eligibility rules; some limited exceptions apply. Players may hold more than one non-FIFA nationality.

No.	Pos.	Nation	Player
3	DF	ARG	Luis Ibáñez
4	DF	CRO	Josip Šimunić (captain)
5	DF	CRO	Jozo Šimunović
6	MF	CRO	Arijan Ademi
7	MF	CRO	Jerko Leko (4th captain)
10	MF	CRO	Sammir (3rd captain)
11	MF	CRO	Ivan Tomečak
13	DF	GHA	Lee Addy (on loan from Dalian Aerbin)
14	DF	CRO	Šime Vrsaljko
15	DF	CRO	Josip Čalušić
16	DF	CRO	Tin Jedvaj
17	MF	BIH	Said Husejinović

No.	Pos.	Nation	Player
18	FW	CRO	Marko Kolar
19	DF	CRO	Josip Pivarić
20	MF	CRO	Zvonko Pamić
21	FW	MNE	Fatos Bećiraj
26	FW	CRO	Fran Brodić
28	MF	CRO	Alen Halilović
30	GK	CRO	Ivan Kelava (vice-captain)
33	GK	BIH	Romeo Mitrović
55	FW	CRO	Ante Rukavina
77	MF	CRO	Marcelo Brozović
90	FW	CRO	Duje Čop
99	FW	CRO	Ivan Krstanović

== Competitions ==
=== Overall ===
Competition	Started round	Final result	First match	Last Match
2012–13 Prva HNL	–	Champions	21 July	26 May
2012–13 Croatian Cup	First round	Second Round	26 September	30 October
2012–13 UEFA Champions League	QR2	Group stage	18 July	4 December

=== Prva HNL ===
==== League table ====
Pos	Team	Pld	W	D	L	GF	GA	GD	Pts	Qualification or relegation
1	Dinamo Zagreb (C)	33	24	5	4	68	20	+48	77	Qualification to Champions League second qualifying round
2	Lokomotiva	33	16	9	8	54	38	+16	57	Qualification to Europa League second qualifying round (Note: Hajduk Split qualify for 2013–14 Europa League Second qualifying round as winners of 2012–13 Croatian Cup.)
3	Rijeka	33	15	8	10	46	42	+4	53	Qualification to Europa League second qualifying round
4	Hajduk Split	33	14	10	9	45	31	+14	52	Qualification to Europa League second qualifying round
5	RNK Split	33	15	7	11	49	37	+12	52	

Source: Sportnet.hr
Rules for classification: 1) points; 2) goal difference; 3) number of goals scored.
For deciding champions, qualification to UEFA Europa League and relegation: 1st points; 2nd head-to-head points; 3rd head-to-head goal difference; 4th head-to-head away goals scored
(C) Champions

==== Results summary ====
Overall								Home						Away					
Pld	W	D	L	GF	GA	GD	Pts	W	D	L	GF	GA	GD	W	D	L	GF	GA	GD
29	21	4	4	61	18	+43	67	12	3	0	40	7	+33	9	1	4	21	11	+10

Last updated: 27 April 2013.
Source: Sportnet.hr

==== Results by round ====
Round	1	2	3	4	5	6	7	8	9	10	11	12	13	14	15	16	17	18	19	20	21	22	23	24	25	26	27	28	29	30	31	32	33
Ground	H	H	A	H	A	H	A	H	A	H	A	A	A	H	A	H	A	H	A	H	A	H	H	A	H	A	H	A	H	A	H	A	H
Result	D	W	W	W	W	W	W	D	L	W	W	W	W	W	L	W	L	W	L	W	W	W	D	D	W	W	W	W	W	D	W	W	W
Position	4	3	2	2	1	1	1	1	1	1	1	1	1	1	1	1	1	1	1	1	1	1	1	1	1	1	1	1	1	1	1	1	1

Updated to match(es) played on 26 May 2013. Source: Competitive matches
A = Away; H = Home; W = Win; D = Draw; L = Loss

=== Champions League ===
==== Group A ====
Pos	Team	Pld	W	D	L	GF	GA	GD	Pts	Qualification	PAR	POR	DKV	DZG
1	(France) Paris Saint-Germain	6	5	0	1	14	3	+11	15	Advance to knockout phase	—	2–1	4–1	4–0
2	(Portugal) Porto	6	4	1	1	10	4	+6	13	Advance to knockout phase	1–0	—	3–2	3–0
3	(Ukraine) Dynamo Kyiv	6	1	2	3	6	10	−4	5	Transfer to Europa League	0–2	0–0	—	2–0
4	(Croatia) Dinamo Zagreb	6	0	1	5	1	14	−13	1		0–2	0–2	1–1	—

Source: Soccerway

== Matches ==
=== Prva HNL ===
Round	Date	Venue	Opponent	Score	Attendance	Dinamo Scorers	Report
1	21 Jul	H	Inter Zaprešić	1 – 1	1,500	Sammir	Sportnet.hr
2	28 Jul	H	Cibalia	2 – 1	3,000	Leko, Čop	Sportnet.hr
3	4 Aug	A	Istra 1961	1 – 0	5,000	Sammir	Sportnet.hr
4	12 Aug	H	RNK Split	4 – 2	3,000	Badelj, Šimunić, Sammir, Čop	Sportnet.hr
5	18 Aug	A	Zadar	3 – 1	3,000	Čop, Sammir	Sportnet.hr
6	25 Aug	H	NK Zagreb	6 – 0	2,470	Alispahić, Vida, Sammir (2), Bećiraj, Leko	Sportnet.hr
7	1 Sep	A	Lokomotiva	3 – 1	600	Rukavina, Vida, Sammir	Sportnet.hr
8	14 Sep	H	Osijek	0 – 0	1,300		Sportnet.hr
9	22 Sep	A	Rijeka	0 – 3	9,500		Sportnet.hr
10	29 Sep	H	Hajduk Split	3 – 1	11,000	Sammir (2), Čop	Sportnet.hr
11	7 Oct	A	Slaven Belupo	4 – 1	2,400	Gregurina (o.g.), Ibáñez, Rukavina, Halilović	Sportnet.hr
12	20 Oct	A	Inter Zaprešić	2 – 0	3,200	Puljić, Čop	Sportnet.hr
13	27 Oct	A	Cibalia	1 – 0	3,500	Krstanović	Sportnet.hr
14	2 Nov	H	Istra 1961	3 – 1	1,000	Vida (2), Sammir	Sportnet.hr
15	10 Nov	A	NK Zagreb	0 – 1	2,000		Sportnet.hr
16	17 Nov	H	Zadar	5 – 0	5,000	Kovačić, Halilović, Bećiraj, Pivarić, Krstanović	Sportnet.hr
17	25 Nov	A	NK Zagreb	0 – 1	4,000		Sportnet.hr
18	30 Nov	H	Lokomotiva	1 – 0	1,000	Čop	Sportnet.hr
19	10 Feb	A	Osijek	1 – 2	3,000	Ademi	Sportnet.hr
20	17 Feb	H	Rijeka	4 – 1	3,500	Krstanović, Čop (3)	Sportnet.hr
21	27 Feb	A	Hajduk Split	2 – 1	25,000	Krstanović, Ibáñez	Sportnet.hr
22	2 Mar	H	Slaven Belupo	3 – 0	2,500	Sammir, Ademi, Pivarić	Sportnet.hr
23	10 Mar	H	Osijek	0 – 0	2,500		Sportnet.hr
24	16 Mar	A	Istra 1961	0 – 0	4,500		Sportnet.hr
25	30 Mar	H	Zadar	5 – 0	973	Krstanović, Šimunović, Bećiraj, Pivarić, Ademi	Sportnet.hr
26	5 Apr	A	NK Zagreb	3 – 0	1,500	Bećiraj, Krstanović (2)	Sportnet.hr
27	14 Apr	H	Inter Zaprešić	2 – 0	1,796	Husejinović, Brozović	Sportnet.hr
28	20 Apr	A	Cibalia	1 – 0	3,500	Jedvaj	Sportnet.hr
29	27 Apr	H	Slaven Belupo	1 – 0	1,000	Bubnjić (o.g.)	Sportnet.hr
30	5 May	A	Rijeka	0 – 0	9,000		Sportnet.hr
31	11 May	H	RNK Split	2 – 0	1,000	Rukavina, Husejinović	Sportnet.hr
32	18 May	A	Lokomotiva	2 – 1	300	Puljić	Sportnet.hr
33	26 May	H	Hajduk Split	3 – 1	8,297	Pamić, Rukavina, Brozović	Sportnet.hr

=== Champions League ===
Round	Date	Venue	Opponent	Score	Attendance	Dinamo Scorers	Report
QR2	18 Jul	A (Bulgaria)	Ludogorets Razgrad (Bulgaria)	1 – 1	23,000	Rukavina	Sportnet.hr
QR2	25 Jul	H	Ludogorets Razgrad (Bulgaria)	3 – 2	25,000	Rukavina (2), Vida	Sportnet.hr
QR3	1 Aug	A (Moldova)	Sheriff Tiraspol (Moldova)	1 – 0	9,000	Bećiraj	Sportnet.hr
QR3	8 Aug	H	Sheriff Tiraspol (Moldova)	4 – 0	15,000	Vida, Bećiraj, Čop, Ibáñez	Sportnet.hr
PO	22 Aug	H	Maribor (Slovenia)	2 – 1	22,000	Čop, Badelj	Sportnet.hr
PO	28 Aug	A (Slovenia)	Maribor (Slovenia)	1 – 0	12,400	Tonel	Sportnet.hr
GS	18 Sep	H	Porto (Portugal)	0 – 2	4,683		Sportnet.hr
GS	3 Oct	A (Ukraine)	Dynamo Kyiv (Ukraine)	0 – 2	47,084		Sportnet.hr
GS	24 Oct	H	Paris Saint-Germain (France)	0 – 2	9,326		Sportnet.hr
GS	6 Nov	A (France)	Paris Saint-Germain (France)	0 – 4	41,060		Sportnet.hr
GS	21 Nov	A (Portugal)	Porto (Portugal)	0 – 3	27,603		Sportnet.hr
GS	4 Dec	H	Dynamo Kyiv (Ukraine)	1 – 1	3,663	Krstanović	Sportnet.hr

=== Croatian Cup ===
Round	Date	Venue	Opponent	Score	Attendance	Dinamo Scorers	Report
R1	25 Sep	A	Vrsar	3 – 0	1,500	Krstanović (3)	Sportnet.hr
R2	30 Oct	H	Zadar	2 – 3 (a.e.t.)	500	Bećiraj, Čop	Sportnet.hr

Sources: Prva-HNL.hr

== Player seasonal records ==
Competitive matches only. Updated to games played 27 April 2013.

=== Top scorers ===
Rank	Name	League	Europe	Cup	Total
1	(Croatia) Duje Čop	9	1	2	12
1	(Croatia) Sammir	12	–	–	12
3	(Croatia) Ivan Krstanović	7	3	1	11
4	(Montenegro) Fatos Bećiraj	4	2	1	7
5	(Croatia) Domagoj Vida	4	–	2	6
6	(Croatia) Ante Rukavina	2	–	3	5
7	(Croatia) Arijan Ademi	3	–	–	3
7	(Argentina) Luis Ibáñez	2	1	–	3
7	(Croatia) Josip Pivarić	3	–	–	3
10	(Croatia) Milan Badelj	1	–	1	2
10	(Croatia) Alen Halilović	2	–	–	2
10	(Croatia) Jerko Leko	2	–	–	2
13	(Bosnia and Herzegovina) Mehmed Alispahić	1	–	–	1
13	(Croatia) Marcelo Brozović	1	–	–	1
13	(Bosnia and Herzegovina) Said Husejinović	1	–	–	1
13	(Croatia) Tin Jedvaj	1	–	–	1
13	(Croatia) Ante Puljić	–	–	1	1
13	(Croatia) Josip Šimunić	–	1	–	1
13	(Croatia) Jozo Šimunović	–	1	–	1
	Own goals	2	–	–	2
	TOTALS	61	13	3	77

Source: Competitive matches
