= Denis Čomor =

Bosnian footballer

Personal information
- Date of birth: 3 January 1990 (age 36)
- Place of birth: Sarajevo, SFR Yugoslavia
- Height: 1.84 m (6 ft 0 in)
- Position: Right-back

Team information
- Current team: NK Kolina

Youth career
- –2009: Sarajevo

Senior career*
Years	Team	Apps	(Gls)
2009–2013	Sarajevo	64	(1)
2013–2014	Slavija Sarajevo	27	(1)
2014–2015	Olimpik	22	(0)
2015–2016	Slavija Sarajevo	24	(0)
2016–2017	Krupa	22	(0)
2017–2018	Mladost Doboj Kakanj	21	(1)
2018–2019	Tuzla City	24	(0)
2019–2020	Borac Banja Luka	5	(0)
2020	Slavija Sarajevo	12	(0)
2021	SV Waldhausen 1926	0	(0)
2021–2022	AC Milan Heidenheim		
2023–	NK Kolina		

International career
2011	Bosnia and Herzegovina U21	1	(0)
- * Club domestic league appearances and goals as of 18:15, 28 February 2023 (UTC)

Denis Čomor (born 3 January 1990) is a Bosnian professional footballer who plays as a right-back for NK Kolina.

== Club career ==
=== Sarajevo ===
Čomor started off his career at hometown club Sarajevo where he played for the club's academy until July 2009, after which he signed a contract with the first team. He spent four years at Sarajevo, making 64 league appearances and scoring 1 goal in the process.

After the end of the 2012–13 season, Čomor left Sarajevo.

=== Slavija Sarajevo ===
On 4 July 2013, Čomor signed a one-year deal with Slavija Sarajevo. His contract expired after the end of the 2013–14 season, and so he left Slavija.

=== Olimpik ===
In the 2014–15 season, Čomor played for another Sarajevan club, Olimpik.

In that season he was a part of the Olimpik team that won the club's first ever significant historic trophy, the Bosnian Cup, after the club beat Široki Brijeg in the final. He left Olimpik in June 2015.

=== 2015–2018 period ===
In between 2015 and 2018, Čomor played for three Bosnian Premier League clubs.

He returned to and played for Slavija from 2015 to 2016, after Slavija, at the time newly promoted Krupa from 2016 to 2017 and after Krupa, from 2017 until June 2018, Mladost Doboj Kakanj.

=== Tuzla City ===
On 30 June 2018, Čomor signed with 2017–18 First League of FBiH champions Tuzla City. He made his debut for Tuzla City on 22 July 2018, in the first matchday of the 2018–19 league season, a 1–0 away loss against Široki Brijeg.

Čomor decided to leave Tuzla City on 2 June 2019.

=== Borac Banja Luka ===
On 11 July 2019, Čomor signed a one-year contract with a possibility of a one more year extension with Borac Banja Luka. He made his official debut for Borac on 10 August 2019, in a 2–1 away league win against Radnik Bijeljina. He decided to leave the club nearly a year later, on 20 May 2020.

=== Return to Slavija ===
On 11 August 2020, Čomor returned to Slavija Sarajevo.

== International career ==
Čomor was a part of the Bosnia and Herzegovina U21 national team and made 1 cap but did not score a goal.

== Career statistics ==
=== Club ===
As of match played 7 November 2020.

Appearances and goals by club, season and competition
Club	Season	League	League		Cup		Continental		Total	
Club	Season	League	Apps	Goals	Apps	Goals	Apps	Goals	Apps	Goals
Sarajevo	2009–10	Bosnian Premier League	14	0	0	0	2	0	16	0
Sarajevo	2010–11	Bosnian Premier League	11	0	0	0	—		11	0
Sarajevo	2011–12	Bosnian Premier League	25	0	2	0	4	0	31	0
Sarajevo	2012–13	Bosnian Premier League	14	1	0	0	6	0	20	1
Sarajevo	Total		64	1	2	0	10	0	76	1
Slavija	2013–14	Bosnian Premier League	27	1	0	0	—		27	1
Olimpik	2014–15	Bosnian Premier League	22	0	4	0	—		26	0
Slavija	2015–16	Bosnian Premier League	24	0	0	0	—		24	0
Krupa	2016–17	Bosnian Premier League	22	0	0	0	—		22	0
Mladost Doboj Kakanj	2017–18	Bosnian Premier League	21	1	0	0	—		21	1
Tuzla City	2018–19	Bosnian Premier League	24	0	1	0	—		25	0
Borac Banja Luka	2019–20	Bosnian Premier League	5	0	2	0	—		7	0
Slavija	2020–21	First League of RS	12	0	2	0	—		14	0
Career total			221	3	11	0	10	0	242	3

== Honours ==
Olimpik

- Bosnian Cup: 2014–15
