= Nermin Haskić =

Bosnian footballer (born 1989)

Personal information
- Date of birth: 27 June 1989 (age 37)
- Place of birth: Banovići, SFR Yugoslavia
- Height: 1.85 m (6 ft 1 in)
- Position: Centre-forward

Team information
- Current team: Velež Mostar
- Number: 17

Youth career
- –2008: Budućnost Banovići

Senior career*
Years	Team	Apps	(Gls)
2008–2011	Budućnost Banovići	28	(9)
2011–2012	Sarajevo	30	(8)
2012–2013	Voždovac	29	(9)
2013–2015	Košice	63	(17)
2015–2017	Žilina	30	(13)
2017	→ Podbeskidzie (loan)	12	(3)
2017–2018	Ružomberok	25	(7)
2018–2019	Radnički Niš	52	(31)
2020–2021	Omiya Ardija	33	(5)
2022–2026	Velež Mostar	106	(33)
Total		408	(135)

International career
2011	Bosnia and Herzegovina	1	(0)
- * Club domestic league appearances and goals

Nermin Haskić (born 27 June 1989) is a Bosnian former professional footballer who played as a centre-forward.

== Club career ==
=== Early career ===
Born in Banovići, SFR Yugoslavia, present-day Bosnia and Herzegovina, Haskić began his career with hometown club Budućnost, making his first-team debut in 2008. He was part of the Budućnost team that won the First League of FBiH in the 2009–10 season, thus achieving their promotion to the Bosnian Premier League.

During the 2010–11 Premier League season, Haskić scored 9 goals in 28 league appearances.

=== Sarajevo ===
In summer 2011, Haskić moved to Premier League side Sarajevo. Soon after arriving, he played with Sarajevo in their 2011–12 UEFA Europa League campaign. He scored the two decisive goals in a 2–0 aggregate victory over Swedish side Örebro SK; however, FK Sarajevo lost in the next round against Sparta Prague.

In the 2011–12 season, Haskić scored 8 goals to finish as FK Sarajevo's top scorer and qualify them for the 2012–13 UEFA Europa League first qualifying round. Haskić moved abroad to Serbia in August 2012, joining Voždovac.

=== Voždovac ===
In the 2012–13 Serbian First League, the season where Haskić played for Voždovac he made 27 league appearances and scored 7 goals.

He was the best foreign top scorer in that season in the Serbian second tier. He left Voždovac in the summer of 2013.

=== Period in Slovakia ===
After his spell in Serbia, Haskić moved to Slovakia, where he played with Košice with whom he won the Slovak Cup in the 2013–14 season, Žilina and Ružomberok.

While he was at Žilina, he was also spontaneously loaned out to the B team of Žilina between 2015 and 2017. From January to June 2017, he was also loaned out to Podbeskidzie Bielsko-Biała.

=== Radnički Niš ===
In June 2018, Haskić moved to the Serbian SuperLiga side FK Radnički Niš.

In the 2018–19 Serbian SuperLiga he was not only the star player of Radnički, but also of the whole league, scoring 24 goals in 34 league games and finished as the league's top scorer. He also led Radnički to be title challengers, even though they did finish on 2nd place.

On 15 May 2019, it was announced that Haskić was included as one of the 11 players in the 2018–19 Serbian SuperLiga team of the season.

=== Omiya Ardija ===
In December 2019, Radnički announced that Haskić signed a contract with J2 League club Omiya Ardija for an undisclosed transfer fee.

=== Velež Mostar ===
In January 2022, Haskić signed with Velež Mostar, returning to the Bosnian Premier League.On 14 February 2022 he scored in the friendly match against Desna Chernihiv at the Winter sports camps in Antalya. In May 2022, he won the Bosnian Cup with Velež.

== International career ==
Haskić made his debut for the Bosnia and Herzegovina national team in an unofficial match on 16 December 2011, in a 1–0 friendly loss against Poland.

== Career statistics ==
=== Club ===
Appearances and goals by club, season and competition
Club	Season	League			National cup (Note: Includes Bosnia and Herzegovina Cup, Slovak Cup, Serbian Cup, Emperor's Cup)		Continental		Total	
Club	Season	Division	Apps	Goals	Apps	Goals	Apps	Goals	Apps	Goals
Budućnost Banovići	2008–09	First League of FBiH					—			
Budućnost Banovići	2009–10	First League of FBiH					—			
Budućnost Banovići	2010–11	Bosnian Premier League	28	9			—		28	9
Budućnost Banovići	Total		28	9			—		28	9
Sarajevo	2011–12	Bosnian Premier League	30	8			4 (Note: Appearance(s) in UEFA Europa League)	2	34	10
Sarajevo	2012–13	Bosnian Premier League	—		—		3	0	3	0
Sarajevo	Total		30	8			7	2	37	10
Voždovac	2012–13	Serbian First League	29	9	—		—		29	9
Košice	2013–14	Slovak First League	28	5	5	0	—		33	5
Košice	2014–15	Slovak First League	31	10	4	4	1	0	36	14
Košice	2015–16	Slovak Second League	4	2	—		—		4	2
Košice	Total		63	17	9	4	1	0	73	21
Žilina	2015–16	Slovak First League	21	8	4	2	—		25	10
Žilina	2016–17	Slovak First League	9	5	3	0	—		12	5
Žilina	Total		30	13	7	2	—		37	15
Podbeskidzie Bielsko-Biała (loan)	2016–17	I liga	12	3	—		—		12	3
Ružomberok	2017–18	Slovak First League	25	7	4	1	4	0	33	8
Radnički Niš	2018–19	Serbian SuperLiga	34	24	4	2	3	2	41	28
Radnički Niš	2019–20	Serbian SuperLiga	18	7	1	0	—		19	7
Radnički Niš	Total		52	31	5	2	3	2	60	35
Omiya Ardija	2020	J2 League	12	1	—		—		12	1
Omiya Ardija	2021	J2 League	21	4	1	0	—		22	4
Omiya Ardija	Total		33	5	1	0	—		34	5
Velež Mostar	2021–22	Bosnian Premier League	8	3	4	2	—		12	5
Velež Mostar	2022–23	Bosnian Premier League	30	12	6	4	2 (Note: Appearance(s) in UEFA Europa Conference League)	0	38	16
Velež Mostar	2023–24	Bosnian Premier League	31	12	3	1	—		34	13
Velež Mostar	2024–25	Bosnian Premier League	23	5	4	0	2	0	29	5
Velež Mostar	2025–26	Bosnian Premier League	14	1	0	0	—		14	1
Velež Mostar	Total		106	33	17	7	4	0	127	40
Career total			408	135	43	16	19	4	466	155

== Honours ==
Budućnost Banovići

- First League of FBiH: 2009–10

Košice

- Slovak Cup: 2013–14

Velež Mostar

- Bosnian Cup: 2021–22

Individual

- Serbian SuperLiga top scorer: 2018–19
- Serbian SuperLiga Team of the Season: 2018–19
