= Sedin Torlak =

Bosnian retired professional footballer (born 1985)

Personal information
- Full name: Sedin Torlak
- Date of birth: 12 January 1985 (age 41)
- Place of birth: Sarajevo, SFR Yugoslavia
- Height: 1.91 m (6 ft 3 in)
- Position: Centre-back

Senior career*
Years	Team	Apps	(Gls)
2006–2008	SAŠK Napredak	41	(3)
2008–2013	Sarajevo	123	(11)
2013	Mes Kerman	0	(0)
2013–2014	Olimpik	20	(1)
Total		184	(15)

International career
2010	Bosnia and Herzegovina	1	(0)

Managerial career
- 2017–2021: Sarajevo U15 (coach)
- 2022: FK Famos Hrasnica
- * Club domestic league appearances and goals

Sedin Torlak (born 12 January 1985) is a Bosnian football manager and retired professional footballer who played as a centre-back. He was most recently a coach at the FK Sarajevo U15 team.

== International career ==
Torlak made one appearance for Bosnia and Herzegovina, in a December 2010 friendly match against Poland, coming on as a second-half substitute for Josip Barišić.

== Career statistics ==
=== Club ===
Appearances and goals by club, season and competition
Club	Season	League			National cup (Note: Includes Bosnia and Herzegovina Cup)		Continental		Total	
Club	Season	Division	Apps	Goals	Apps	Goals	Apps	Goals	Apps	Goals
Sarajevo	2008–09	Bosnian Premier League	23	1			—		23	1
Sarajevo	2009–10	Bosnian Premier League	25	1			6 (Note: Appearance(s) in UEFA Europa League)	0	31	1
Sarajevo	2010–11	Bosnian Premier League	25	1			—		25	1
Sarajevo	2011–12	Bosnian Premier League	25	4			4	0	29	4
Sarajevo	2012–13	Bosnian Premier League	25	4	1	0	6	1	32	5
Sarajevo	Total		123	11	1	0	16	1	140	12
Olimpik	2013–14	Bosnian Premier League	20	1	3	0	—		23	1
Career total			143	12	4	0	16	1	163	13

== Managerial statistics ==
As of match played 5 April 2022

Team	Nat	From	To	Record							
Team	Nat	From	To	G	W	D	L	GF	GA	GD	Win %
Famos Hrasnica	(Bosnia and Herzegovina)	24 August 2021	5 April 2022	18	8	2	8	23	20	+3	44.44
Total				18	8	2	8	23	20	+3	44.44

== Honours ==
Individual

- Ismir Pintol trophy: 2010–11, 2012–13
