= Secouba Diatta =

Senegalese footballer (born 1992)

Personal information
- Date of birth: 22 December 1992 (age 33)
- Place of birth: Dakar, Senegal
- Height: 1.86 m (6 ft 1 in)
- Position: Forward

Senior career*
Years	Team	Apps	(Gls)
–2010	Radnik Hadžići		
2010–2012	Mladá Boleslav B		
2012–2013	Sarajevo	3	(0)
2013–2015	Zvijezda Gradačac	56	(14)
2015–2016	Željezničar	4	(0)
2016	Bratstvo Gračanica	13	(5)
2016–2017	Anagennisi Karditsa	25	(3)
2017–2018	Trikala	1	(0)
2018	Ierapetra		
2018–2019	PS Sparti		
2019	Aspropyrgos		
2019–2020	Egaleo	8	(1)
2020	Ialysos	4	(1)
2020–2021	Anagennisi Deryneia		
2021–2022	Almyros		
2022–2023	Yangiyer	10	(3)
2023	Acharnaikos		
- * Club domestic league appearances and goals as of 7 January 2024

Secouba Diatta (born 25 August 1992) is a Senegalese professional footballer who plays as a forward who last played for Acharnaikos.

== Club career ==
=== Bosnia and Herzegovina ===
In January 2013, Diatta signed a contract with Bosnian club Zvijezda Gradačac. In July 2015, Diatta left the club.

In the summer of 2015, Diatta signed a contract with Bosnian club Željezničar. After half season, Diatta left the club.

In February 2016, Diatta signed for another Bosnian club Bratstvo Gračanica. He left the club next summer.

=== Greece ===
In July 2016, Diatta signed for Greek second-tier club Anagennisi Karditsa. He left the club after one year.

In July 2017, Diatta signed for another Greek club Trikala.

In July 2019, Diatta signed for another Greek club Egaleo. Diatta left the club in January 2020.

== Personal life ==
In November 2014, Diatta received Bosnian citizenship.

== Career statistics ==
=== Club ===
As of match played 10 November 2023

Appearances and goals by club, season and competition
Club	Season	League			National cup (Note: Appearance(s) in Bosnia and Herzegovina Football Cup, Greek Football Cup)		Europe		Total	
Club	Season	League	Apps	Goals	Apps	Goals	Apps	Goals	Apps	Goals
Sarajevo	2011–12	Bosnian Premier League	2	0	0	0	—		2	0
Sarajevo	2012–13	Bosnian Premier League	1	0	0	0	–		1	0
Sarajevo	Total		3	0	0	0	0	0	3	0
Zvijezda Gradačac	2012–13	Bosnian Premier League	13	4	0	0	—		13	4
Zvijezda Gradačac	2013–14	Bosnian Premier League	21	2	0	0	–		21	2
Zvijezda Gradačac	2014–15	Bosnian Premier League	23	8	3	0	–		21	2
Zvijezda Gradačac	Total		56	14	3	0	0	0	59	14
Željezničar	2015–16	Bosnian Premier League	4	0	1	0	3 (Note: Appearance(s) in UEFA Europa League)	0	8	0
Bratstvo Gračanica	2015–16	First League of FBiH	13	5	0	0	–		13	5
Anagennisi Karditsa	2016–17	Super League Greece 2	25	3	2	0	–		27	3
Trikala	2017–18	Super League Greece 2	1	0	1	0	–		2	0
Egaleo	2019–20	Super League Greece 2	12	2	2	0	–		14	2
Yangiyer	2022	Uzbekistan Pro League	10	3	0	0	–		10	3
Career total			125	27	9	0	3	0	137	27
