= Said Husejinović =

Bosnian footballer (born 1988)

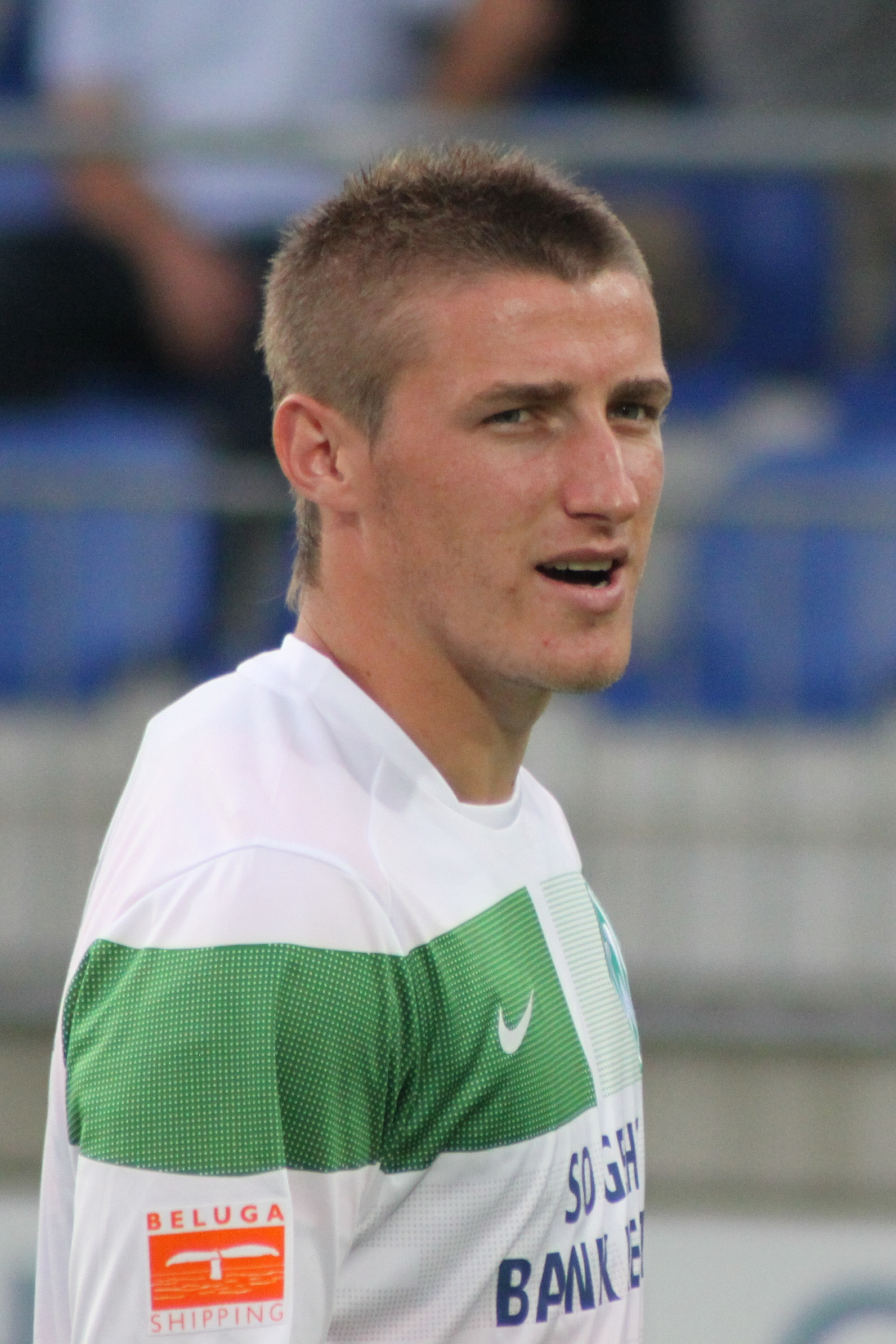
- Husejinović with Werder Bremen in 2009

Personal information
- Date of birth: 17 May 1988 (age 38)
- Place of birth: Zvornik, SFR Yugoslavia
- Height: 1.78 m (5 ft 10 in)
- Position: Attacking midfielder

Team information
- Current team: Sloboda Tuzla
- Number: 8

Youth career
- 2000–2006: Sloboda Tuzla

Senior career*
Years	Team	Apps	(Gls)
2006–2008	Sloboda Tuzla	47	(21)
2008–2011	Werder Bremen	10	(0)
2009	→ Kaiserslautern (loan)	4	(0)
2012	Sarajevo	23	(7)
2013–2016	Dinamo Zagreb	24	(3)
2015	→ Lokomotiva (loan)	3	(0)
2016	→ Dinamo Zagreb II	2	(0)
2016–2018	Sarajevo	16	(2)
2018–2019	Sloboda Tuzla	29	(3)
2019	Tuzla City	16	(1)
2020–	Sloboda Tuzla	145	(14)

International career
2006–2008	Bosnia and Herzegovina U21		
2007–2008	Bosnia and Herzegovina	3	(0)
- * Club domestic league appearances and goals as of 22 March 2026

Said Husejinović (born 17 May 1988) is a Bosnian professional footballer who plays as an attacking midfielder for First League of FBiH club Sloboda Tuzla.

== Club career ==
=== Werder Bremen ===
On 1 July 2008, it was announced that Werder Bremen and Sloboda Tuzla had come to an agreement over the transfer of Husejinović to Werder for €900,000. On 17 January 2009, Husejinović was loaned to 1. FC Kaiserslautern until the end of the season.

=== Sarajevo ===
On 26 July 2012, he scored two goals against Bulgarian side Levski Sofia in a UEFA Europa League match to help his team to a prestigious 3–1 win (the Bosnians advanced to the next round after an aggregate score of 3–2 and were subsequently eliminated by Montenegrin club FK Zeta.

=== Dinamo Zagreb ===
In late December 2012, he was close to signing a contract with CSKA Sofia, but instead joined Dinamo Zagreb in early January 2013. He was injured in a game against RNK Split in October 2013. He was not able to play until May 2014. After the injury, he was loaned out to Lokomotiva Zagreb in 2015 and for a short period in 2016, played for the Dinamo Zagreb second team.

=== Sarajevo ===
After not enough playing time, Husejinović left Dinamo Zagreb and signed a contract with his former club Sarajevo. He left the club after 2 years in 2018.

=== Sloboda Tuzla ===
On 1 July 2018, Husejinović signed with Sloboda Tuzla. He left Sloboda on 15 June 2019 after his contract expired.

During his time in Sloboda, Husejinović was one of the best players of the club during the 2018–19 season, and was also one of the players with the most games played. He played in 29 league games and in 31 games in all competitions (including the league), scoring 3 goals in the process.

=== Tuzla City ===
On 17 June 2019, Husejinović signed a three-year contract with Tuzla City. He made his official debut for Tuzla City on 20 July 2019, in a 1–5 away league win against Zvijezda 09. Husejinović scored his first goal for Tuzla City also in a league match, this time in a 1–3 away win against Široki Brijeg on 15 September 2019.

On 11 December 2019, Tuzla City and Husejinović decided to part ways, mutually terminating his contract with the club.

=== Return to Sloboda Tuzla ===
In January 2020, for a second time in his career, Husejinović decided to come back to Sloboda Tuzla. He scored his first goal for Sloboda since his return on 12 August 2020, in a league match against Mladost Doboj Kakanj.

== International career ==
Husejinović has played for the national U21 team. He made his senior debut for Bosnia and Herzegovina in a March 2008 friendly match against Macedonia and has earned a total of 2 caps, scoring no goals. His other international was an August 2008 friendly against Bulgaria.

== Career statistics ==
=== Club ===
As of match played 22 March 2026

Appearances and goals by club, season and competition
Club	Season	League			National cup (Note: Includes Bosnian Cup, DFB-Pokal, Croatian Cup)		Continental		Other		Total	
Club	Season	Division	Apps	Goals	Apps	Goals	Apps	Goals	Apps	Goals	Apps	Goals
Sloboda Tuzla	2007–08	Bosnian Premier League	25	5			—		—		25	5
Werder Bremen	2008–09	Bundesliga	3	0	0	0	0	0	—		3	0
Werder Bremen	2009–10	Bundesliga	3	0	0	0	0	0	—		3	0
Werder Bremen	2010–11	Bundesliga	4	0	0	0	0	0	—		4	0
Werder Bremen	Total		10	0	0	0	0	0	—		10	0
Kaiserslautern (loan)	2008–09	2. Bundesliga	4	0	—		—		—		4	0
Sarajevo	2011–12	Bosnian Premier League	8	4	—		—		—		8	4
Sarajevo	2012–13	Bosnian Premier League	15	3	3	0	6 (Note: Appearances in UEFA Europa League)	2	—		24	5
Sarajevo	Total		23	7	3	0	6	2	—		32	9
Dinamo Zagreb	2012–13	1. HNL	10	2	—		—		—		10	2
Dinamo Zagreb	2013–14	1. HNL	12	1	2	0	7 (Note: Six appearances in UEFA Champions League; one appearance in UEFA Europa League)	0	1 (Note: Appearance in Croatian Super Cup)	0	22	1
Dinamo Zagreb	2014–15	1. HNL	0	0	—		—		—		0	0
Dinamo Zagreb	2015–16	1. HNL	2	0	—		—		—		2	0
Dinamo Zagreb	Total		24	3	2	0	7	0	1	0	34	3
Lokomotiva (loan)	2015–16	1. HNL	3	0	1	1	—		—		4	1
Dinamo Zagreb II	2015–16	2. HNL	2	0	—		—		—		2	0
Sarajevo	2016–17	Bosnian Premier League	9	1	6	2	—		—		15	3
Sarajevo	2017–18	Bosnian Premier League	7	1	—		—		—		7	1
Sarajevo	Total		16	2	6	2	—		—		22	4
Sloboda Tuzla	2018–19	Bosnian Premier League	29	3	1	0	—		—		30	3
Tuzla City	2019–20	Bosnian Premier League	16	1	—		—		—		16	1
Sloboda Tuzla	2019–20	Bosnian Premier League	3	0	—		—		—		3	0
Sloboda Tuzla	2020–21	Bosnian Premier League	28	4	—		—		—		28	4
Sloboda Tuzla	2021–22	Bosnian Premier League	26	1	3	0	—		—		29	1
Sloboda Tuzla	2022–23	Bosnian Premier League	24	1	1	2	—		—		25	3
Sloboda Tuzla	2023–24	First League of FBiH	29	5	3	0	—		—		32	5
Sloboda Tuzla	2024–25	Bosnian Premier League	23	1	—		—		—		23	1
Sloboda Tuzla	2025–26	First League of FBiH	12	2	1	0	—		—		13	2
Sloboda Tuzla	Total		145	14	8	2	—		—		153	16
Career total			297	35	21	5	13	2	1	0	332	42

=== International ===
Appearances and goals by national team and year
National team	Year	Apps	Goals
Bosnia and Herzegovina
Bosnia and Herzegovina	2007	1	0
Bosnia and Herzegovina	2008	2	0
Total		3	0

== Honours ==
Werder Bremen

- DFB-Pokal: 2008–09

Dinamo Zagreb

- 1. HNL: 2012–13, 2013–14, 2014–15, 2015–16
- Croatian Cup: 2014–15, 2015–16
- Croatian Super Cup: 2013

Sloboda Tuzla

- First League of the FBiH: 2023–24
