= Amer Dupovac =

Bosnian footballer (born 1991)

Personal information
- Date of birth: 29 May 1991 (age 35)
- Place of birth: Sarajevo, SR Bosnia, SFR Yugoslavia
- Height: 1.89 m (6 ft 2 in)
- Position: Centre-back

Youth career
- 2009–2010: Sarajevo

Senior career*
Years	Team	Apps	(Gls)
2010–2014	Sarajevo	95	(4)
2015–2016	Sheriff Tiraspol	17	(1)
2017	Split	23	(0)
2017–2018	Borac Čačak	28	(0)
2018–2023	Sarajevo	78	(1)
2022–2023	→ Igman Konjic (loan)	25	(0)
2023–2024	Igman Konjic	28	(0)
Total		294	(6)

International career
2011–2012	Bosnia and Herzegovina U21	3	(0)
2011	Bosnia and Herzegovina	1	(0)
- * Club domestic league appearances and goals

Amer Dupovac (born 29 May 1991) is a Bosnian former professional footballer who played as a centre-back.

== Club career ==
Dupovac started playing with hometown club Sarajevo where, after playing in the youth squad, he debuted as senior in the 2010–11 Bosnian Premier League season.

He played with Sarajevo in the Bosnian Premier League until the winter break of the 2014–15 season, when he moved to Moldovan National Division side Sheriff Tiraspol. Two years later, at the winter break of the 2016–17 season, Dupovac moved to Croatian side Split, playing in the 1. HNL.

The following summer, he left Croatia and moved to Serbia where he signed with SuperLiga side Borac Čačak. He left Borac in June 2018.

On 22 June 2018, after three and a half years he came back to Sarajevo and signed a two-year contract. Dupovac scored his fifth goals for Sarajevo on 10 April 2019, in a 5–0 home win against Sloga Gornje Crnjelovo in the 2018–19 Bosnian Cup semi final game. He scored two goals in that game. In the 2018–19 season, Dupovac won the double with Sarajevo, winning both the Bosnian Premier League and the Bosnian Cup.

He won his second league title with the club on 1 June 2020, though after the 2019–20 Bosnian Premier League season was ended abruptly due to the COVID-19 pandemic in Bosnia and Herzegovina and after which Sarajevo were by default crowned league champions for a second consecutive time. Dupovac extended his contract with Sarajevo on 17 June 2020, lasting until June 2022. On 21 February 2021, he again extended his contract with the club until June 2024.

== International career ==
Dupovac was a member of the Bosnia and Herzegovina U21 team in 2011.

That same year, on 16 December 2011, Dupovac made an appearance for the Bosnia and Herzegovina national team in a friendly match against Poland.

== Career statistics ==
=== Club ===
Club	Season	League	League		Cup		Continental		Total	
Club	Season	League	Apps	Goals	Apps	Goals	Apps	Goals	Apps	Goals
Sarajevo	2010–11	Bosnian Premier League	9	0	1	0	—		10	0
Sarajevo	2011–12	Bosnian Premier League	21	0	5	0	3	0	29	0
Sarajevo	2012–13	Bosnian Premier League	26	1	3	0	4	0	33	1
Sarajevo	2013–14	Bosnian Premier League	26	1	8	0	4	0	38	1
Sarajevo	2014–15	Bosnian Premier League	13	2	2	0	6	0	21	2
Sarajevo	Total		95	4	19	0	17	0	131	4
Sheriff Tiraspol	2014–15	Divizia Națională	10	1	—		—		10	1
Sheriff Tiraspol	2015–16	Divizia Națională	7	0	—		1	0	8	0
Sheriff Tiraspol	2016–17	Divizia Națională	0	0	—		1	0	1	0
Sheriff Tiraspol	Total		17	1	—		2	0	19	1
RNK Split	2016–17	1. HNL	23	0	3	0	—		26	0
Borac Čačak	2017–18	Serbian SuperLiga	28	0	2	0	—		30	0
Sarajevo	2018–19	Bosnian Premier League	21	0	6	2	2	0	29	2
Sarajevo	2019–20	Bosnian Premier League	6	0	1	1	0	0	7	1
Sarajevo	2020–21	Bosnian Premier League	28	1	5	0	4	0	37	1
Sarajevo	2021–22	Bosnian Premier League	23	0	2	0	2	0	27	0
Sarajevo	2022–23	Bosnian Premier League	0	0	0	0	—		0	0
Sarajevo	Total		78	1	14	3	8	0	100	4
Igman Konjic (loan)	2022–23	Bosnian Premier League	25	0	1	0	—		26	0
Igman Konjic	2023–24	Bosnian Premier League	28	0	1	0	—		29	0
Igman Konjic	Total		53	0	2	0	—		55	0
Career total			294	6	40	3	27	0	361	9

=== International ===
As of match played 16 December 2011.

National team	Year	Apps	Goals
Bosnia and Herzegovina
Bosnia and Herzegovina	2011	1	0
Total		1	0

== Honours ==
Sarajevo

- Bosnian Premier League: 2018–19, 2019–20
- Bosnian Cup: 2013–14, 2018–19, 2020–21

Sheriff Tiraspol

- Divizia Națională: 2015–16
- Moldovan Cup: 2014–15
- Moldovan Super Cup: 2015, 2016
