= Nemanja Zlatković =

Serbian footballer

Personal information
- Full name: Nemanja Zlatković
- Date of birth: 21 August 1988 (age 38)
- Place of birth: Belgrade, SFR Yugoslavia
- Height: 1.79 m (5 ft 10 in)
- Position: Left-back

Team information
- Current team: Sinđelić Beograd (manager)

Youth career
- Red Star Belgrade

Senior career*
Years	Team	Apps	(Gls)
2007–2009	Zemun	33	(1)
2009–2011	Žilina	15	(1)
2010–2011	→ Diagoras (loan)	24	(2)
2012	Fastav Zlín	2	(0)
2012–2013	Sarajevo	19	(0)
2013	Panachaiki	4	(0)
2014	Javor Ivanjica	7	(2)
2014–2015	Voždovac	22	(0)
2016	Novi Pazar	11	(0)
2016	Zemun	5	(0)
2017	Radnik Bijeljina	6	(0)
2017–2018	Ängelholm	5	(0)
2018	Voždovac	5	(0)
2019	Tuzla City	25	(0)
2020	Čelik Zenica	0	(0)
2020–2021	Dinamo Pančevo		
2021	Sloga Kraljevo	12	(0)
2021	OFK Beograd		
2022	Podunavac Belegiš		

International career
2007	Serbia U19	3	(0)

Managerial career
- 2025-: Sinđelić Beograd
- * Club domestic league appearances and goals as of 9 November 2019

Nemanja Zlatković (Serbian Cyrillic: Немања Златковић; born 21 August 1988) is a Serbian retired footballer who played as a left-back.

== Career ==
In August 2020, Zlatković joined FK Dinamo Pančevo. After a spell at FK Sloga Kraljevo, Zlatković moved to OFK Beograd in the summer 2021.
