= Anes Haurdić =

Bosnian-Herzegovinian footballer

Anes Haurdic
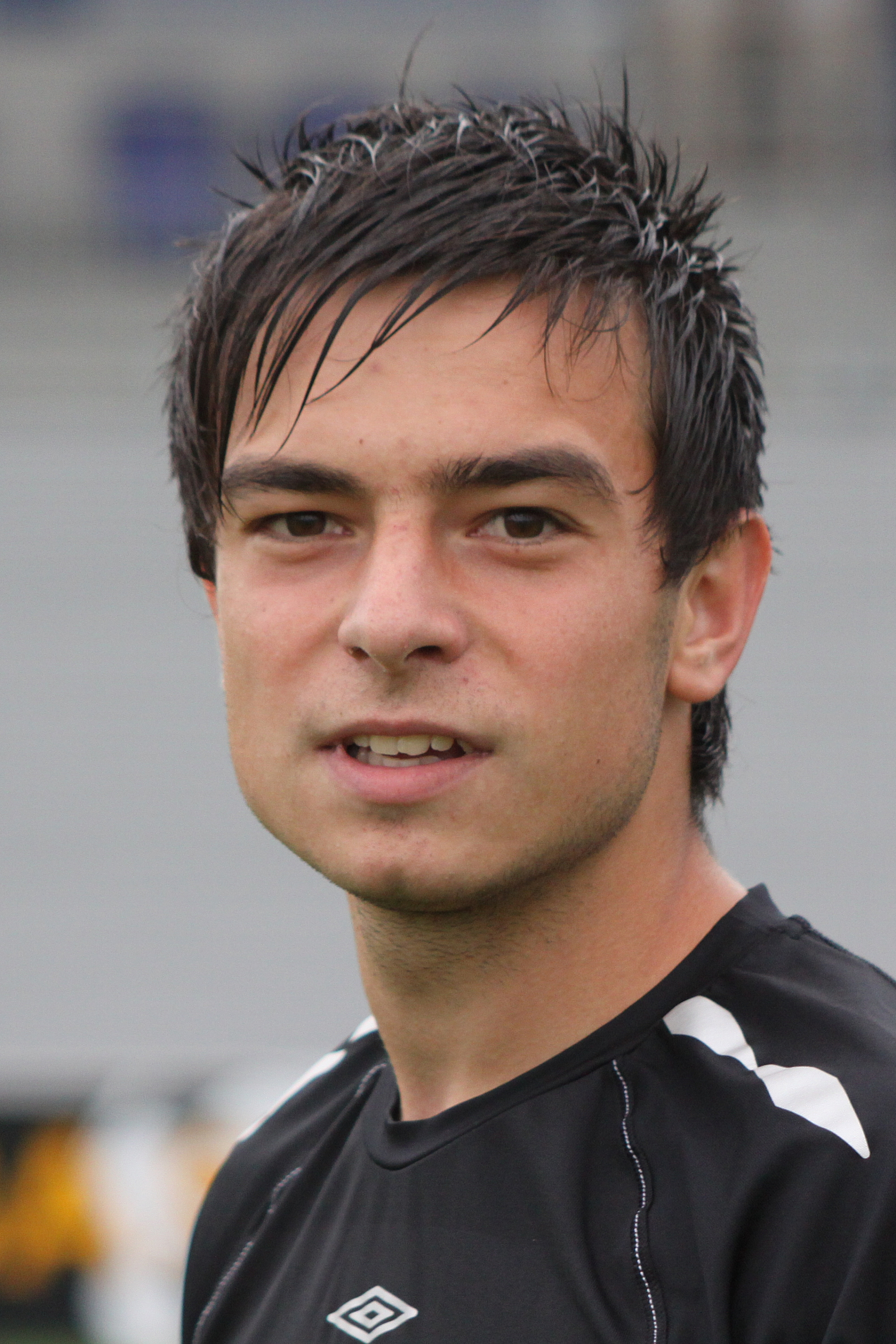

Personal information
- Date of birth: 1 March 1990 (age 36)
- Place of birth: Sarajevo, SFR Yugoslavia
- Height: 1.74 m (5 ft 9 in)
- Position: Midfielder

Team information
- Current team: Baton Sarajevo

Youth career
- 2002–2006: FK Sarajevo
- 2006–2009: Baumit Jablonec

Senior career*
Years	Team	Apps	(Gls)
2009–2013	Baumit Jablonec	61	(5)
2013	FK Sarajevo	12	(2)
2014	Znojmo	9	(0)
2014–2016	Velež Mostar	34	(4)
2016	Sloboda Tuzla	9	(1)
2016–2017	Čelik Zenica	18	(1)
2020–	Unis Vogošća		

International career
2009–2010	Bosnia and Herzegovina U21	7	(2)
- * Club domestic league appearances and goals as of 18 November 2017

Anes Haurdić (born 1 March 1990) is a Bosnian-Herzegovinian football player who plays for Unis Vogošća.

== Club career ==
After a career in the Czech First League and with several Bosnian Premier League clubs, Haurdić returned to football in 2020 after a career break and signed for ambitious Bosnian lower league side Unis Vogošća.
