= Žarko Karamatić =

Serbian footballer

Personal information
- Full name: Žarko Karamatić
- Date of birth: 8 June 1988 (age 38)
- Place of birth: Zvečan, SFR Yugoslavia
- Height: 1.77 m (5 ft 9 1/2 in)
- Positions: Winger; forward

Youth career
- 2000–2001: FK Trepča
- 2001–2007: Mladost Apatin

Senior career*
Years	Team	Apps	(Gls)
2007–2009	Mladost Apatin	41	(3)
2009–2010	Banat Zrenjanin	20	(2)
2010–2012	Radnički 1923	20	(0)
2012	Slavija Sarajevo	15	(7)
2012–2013	FK Sarajevo	8	(0)
2013	Radnik Bijeljina	12	(0)
2013–2014	Slavija Sarajevo	26	(5)
2014–2015	Trepča		
2015	Travnik		
2015–2016	Trepča		
2016–2018	Mokra Gora		
2018-	Trepča		
Total		142	(17)
- * Club domestic league appearances and goals as of 02 February 2016

Žarko Karamatić (Serbian Cyrillic: Жарко Караматић; born 8 June 1988) is a Serbian footballer.

== Career ==
Karamatić was born in Zvečan, to Serbian parents Zoran and Zorica. After starting out with the hometown side FK Trepča, Karamatić was noticed by Mladost Apatin where he moved in the early 2000s. He stayed there until 2010, when he moved to Banat Zrenjanin. After a short spell with them and later with Radnički 1923 and Slavija Sarajevo, Karamatić signed for FK Sarajevo where he managed to score one goal and make two assists in the six games that Sarajevo played in UEFA Europa League qualifications that season.
