= Radan Šunjevarić =

Serbian footballer

Personal information
- Full name: Radan Šunjevarić
- Date of birth: 10 February 1983 (age 43)
- Place of birth: Titovo Užice, SFR Yugoslavia
- Height: 1.72 m (5 ft 8 in)
- Position: Defensive midfielder

Team information
- Current team: Jedinstvo Užice

Senior career*
Years	Team	Apps	(Gls)
2001–2010	Sevojno	202	(11)
2010–2011	Sloboda Užice	29	(1)
2011–2012	Novi Pazar	18	(0)
2012–2013	Sarajevo	23	(0)
2013–2014	Borac Čačak	22	(2)
2015–2019	Jedinstvo Užice	21	(0)
- * Club domestic league appearances and goals as of 4 November 2017

Radan Šunjevarić (Serbian Cyrillic: Радан Шуњеварић; born 10 February 1983) is a Serbian retired footballer.

== Career ==
Šunjevarić spent almost ten seasons at Sevojno, before the club merged with Sloboda Užice in 2010. He also played for Novi Pazar, before moving to Sarajevo in June 2012. In the summer of 2013, Šunjevarić returned to his homeland and signed with Borac Čačak.

== Honours ==
Sevojno

- Serbian Cup: Runner-up 2008–09
