= Adin Džafić =

Bosnian-Herzegovinian footballer

Personal information
- Date of birth: 21 May 1989 (age 37)
- Place of birth: Srebrenik, Bosnia and Herzegovina
- Height: 1.87 m (6 ft 2 in)
- Position: Forward

Youth career
- OFK Beograd

Senior career*
| Years | Team | Apps | (Gls) |
| 2006–2007 | Čelik Zenica | 12 | (0) |
| 2008–2009 | Cibalia | 26 | (2) |
| 2009–2010 | Velež Mostar | 27 | (13) |
| 2010–2011 | Čelik Zenica | 22 | (2) |
| 2011–2012 | FK Sarajevo | 5 | (0) |
| 2012 | Sloboda Tuzla | 5 | (0) |
| 2012 | Gradina | 3 | (2) |
| 2013 | San Antonio Scorpions | 0 | (0) |
| 2014 | Gradina | 10 | (1) |
| 2014–2015 | Sloboda Tuzla | 8 | (0) |
| 2015 | Radnički Lukavac | 8 | (1) |
| 2016 | Jedinstvo Brčko | | |
| 2016 | SC Rabenstein | | |

International career
| 2008–2010 | Bosnia and Herzegovina U21 | 15 | (1) |
| 2010 | Bosnia and Herzegovina | 1 | (0) |
- * Club domestic league appearances and goals

Adin Džafić (born 21 May 1989) is a Bosnian-Herzegovinian retired footballer who last played for Austrian side SC Rabenstein.

== International career ==
He made his debut for Bosnia and Herzegovina in a December 2010 friendly match against Poland. It remained his sole international appearance.
