= Alen Melunović =

Serbian former footballer (born 1990)

Personal information
- Date of birth: 26 January 1990 (age 36)
- Place of birth: Prijepolje, SFR Yugoslavia
- Height: 1.91 m (6 ft 3 in)
- Position: Forward

Youth career
- 2007–2009: Partizan

Senior career*
| Years | Team | Apps | (Gls) |
| 2009 | Radnik Hadžići | | |
| 2009–2013 | Teplice | 20 | (0) |
| 2010 | → Ústí nad Labem (loan) | 10 | (2) |
| 2011–2012 | → Varnsdorf (loan) | 22 | (8) |
| 2012–2013 | Sarajevo | 11 | (3) |
| 2013–2014 | Widzew Łódź | 11 | (1) |
| 2014–2015 | Teplice | 2 | (0) |
| 2015 | → Ústí nad Labem (loan) | 10 | (8) |
| 2015 | Šport Podbrezová | 7 | (1) |
| 2016 | VV Unicum | | |
| 2016–2017 | Rudar Pljevlja | 21 | (7) |
| 2017 | Budućnost Podgorica | 15 | (6) |
| 2018 | Shijiazhuang Ever Bright | 24 | (10) |
| 2019 | Guangdong South China Tiger | 20 | (8) |
| 2020–2021 | Napredak Kruševac | 23 | (14) |
| 2021–2022 | Samsunspor | 0 | (0) |
| 2022 | Napredak Kruševac | 13 | (2) |
| 2022–2023 | Iraklis | 8 | (2) |
| 2023 | Floriana | 9 | (0) |
- * Club domestic league appearances and goals as of 7 January 2024

Alen Melunović (born 26 January 1990) is a Serbian former professional footballer who played as a forward.

== Career ==
Melunović began his professional career at the Czech Gambrinus liga side FK Teplice. He made his first team debut for Teplice as a second-half substitute against Dynamo České Budějovice on 30 May 2009.

On 7 August 2021, he joined Samsunspor in Turkey.

== Career statistics ==
As of 21 April 2023

Appearances and goals by club, season and competition
| Club | Season | League | | | Cup | | Continental | | Other | | Total | |
| Club | Season | Division | Apps | Goals | Apps | Goals | Apps | Goals | Apps | Goals | Apps | Goals |
|---|---|---|---|---|---|---|---|---|---|---|---|---|
| Teplice | 2008–09 | Czech First League | 1 | 0 | 0 | 0 | — | | — | | 0 | 0 |
| Teplice | 2009–10 | Czech First League | 0 | 0 | 0 | 0 | — | | — | | 0 | 0 |
| Teplice | 2010–11 | Czech First League | 6 | 0 | 0 | 0 | — | | — | | 6 | 0 |
| Teplice | 2011–12 | Czech First League | 1 | 0 | 0 | 0 | — | | — | | 1 | 0 |
| Teplice | 2012–13 | Czech First League | 11 | 0 | 0 | 0 | — | | — | | 11 | 0 |
| Teplice | Total | | 19 | 0 | 0 | 0 | — | | — | | 19 | 0 |
| Ústí nad Labem (loan) | 2009–10 | Czech 2. Liga | 10 | 2 | 0 | 0 | — | | — | | 10 | 2 |
| Varnsdorf (loan) | 2011–12 | Czech 2. Liga | 22 | 8 | 0 | 0 | — | | — | | 22 | 8 |
| Sarajevo | 2012–13 | Bosnian Premier League | 11 | 3 | 0 | 0 | — | | — | | 11 | 3 |
| Widzew Łódź | 2013–14 | Ekstraklasa | 11 | 1 | 1 | 0 | 4 | 1 | — | | 16 | 2 |
| Teplice | 2014–15 | Czech First League | 2 | 0 | 0 | 0 | — | | — | | 2 | 0 |
| Ústí nad Labem | 2014–15 | Czech National Football League | 10 | 8 | 0 | 0 | — | | — | | 10 | 8 |
| ŽP Šport Podbrezová | 2015–16 | Fortuna Liga | 7 | 1 | 0 | 0 | — | | — | | 7 | 1 |
| Rudar Pljevlja | 2016–17 | Montenegrin First League | 21 | 7 | 3 | 0 | — | | — | | 24 | 7 |
| Budućnost Podgorica | 2017–18 | Montenegrin First League | 15 | 6 | 3 | 1 | 2 | 0 | — | | 20 | 7 |
| Shijiazhuang Ever Bright | 2018 | China League One | 24 | 10 | 0 | 0 | — | | — | | 24 | 10 |
| Guangdong South China Tiger | 2019 | China League One | 20 | 8 | 0 | 0 | — | | — | | 20 | 8 |
| Napredak Kruševac | 2020–21 | Serbian SuperLiga | 23 | 14 | 0 | 0 | — | | — | | 23 | 14 |
| Samsunspor | 2021–22 | TFF First League | 0 | 0 | 0 | 0 | — | | — | | 0 | 0 |
| Napredak Kruševac | 2021–22 | Serbian SuperLiga | 13 | 2 | 0 | 0 | — | | — | | 13 | 2 |
| Iraklis | 2022–23 | Super League Greece 2 | 8 | 2 | 1 | 0 | — | | — | | 9 | 2 |
| Floriana | 2022–23 | Maltese Premier League | 9 | 0 | 0 | 0 | — | | — | | 9 | 0 |
| Career total | | | 225 | 72 | 8 | 1 | 6 | 1 | 0 | 0 | 239 | 74 |

== Honours ==
=== Individual ===
- Serbian SuperLiga Player of the Week: 2020–21 (Round 33, Round 37)
