= Dino Hamzić =

Bosnian footballer

Personal information
- Full name: Dino Hamzić
- Date of birth: 22 January 1988 (age 38)
- Place of birth: Sarajevo, SFR Yugoslavia
- Height: 1.91 m (6 ft 3 in)
- Position: Goalkeeper

Team information
- Current team: Slavija Sarajevo
- Number: 1

Youth career
- 2006–2007: Sarajevo

Senior career*
Years	Team	Apps	(Gls)
2007–2011	Sarajevo	29	(0)
2012–2014	Olimpik	51	(0)
2014	Widzew Łódź	14	(0)
2015	Olimpik	19	(0)
2016–2020	Chikhura Sachkhere	121	(0)
2020	Olimpik	0	(0)
2021–2023	Torpedo Kutaisi	27	(0)
2023–2024	Igman Konjic	6	(0)
2024–	Slavija Sarajevo	12	(0)

International career
2009	Bosnia and Herzegovina U21	2	(0)
- * Club domestic league appearances and goals as of 6 January 2025

Dino Hamzić (born 22 January 1988) is a Bosnian professional footballer who plays as a goalkeeper for First League of the RS club Slavija Sarajevo.

== International career ==
In 2009, he played for the Bosnia and Herzegovina under-21 national team.

== Honours ==
Olimpik

- Bosnian Cup: 2014–15

Chikhura Sachkhere

- Georgian Cup: 2017

Torpedo Kutaisi

- Georgian Cup: 2022
