= Semir Bajraktarević =

Bosnian footballer

Personal information
- Date of birth: 14 October 1987 (age 39)
- Place of birth: Sarajevo, SFR Yugoslavia
- Height: 1.79 m (5 ft 10 in)
- Position: Attacking midfielder

Team information
- Current team: Olimpik
- Number: 8

Youth career
- Sarajevo

Senior career*
| Years | Team | Apps | (Gls) |
| 2008–2011 | SAŠK Napredak (Note: Stats only for the 2008–09 season) | 2 | (1) |
| 2011–2012 | Sarajevo | 14 | (2) |
| 2012–2014 | Čelik Zenica | 53 | (2) |
| 2014–2015 | Sloboda Tuzla | 12 | (1) |
| 2015–2016 | Čelik Zenica | 38 | (6) |
| 2016–2017 | Ironi Nesher | 17 | (1) |
| 2017 | Hapoel Petah Tikva | 17 | (2) |
| 2017–2018 | Hapoel Hadera | 35 | (8) |
| 2018–2019 | Maccabi Ahi Nazareth | 32 | (0) |
| 2019–2020 | Flamurtari | 6 | (0) |
| 2020 | Čelik Zenica | 2 | (0) |
| 2020– | Olimpik | 18 | (0) |
- * Club domestic league appearances and goals as of 21 March 2021

Semir Bajraktarević (born 14 October 1987) is a Bosnian professional footballer who plays as an attacking midfielder for Bosnian Premier League club Olimpik.
