= Vučina Šćepanović =

Serbian footballer

Personal information
- Full name: Vučina Šćepanović
- Date of birth: 17 November 1982 (age 43)
- Place of birth: Priština, SFR Yugoslavia
- Height: 1.86 m (6 ft 1 in)
- Position: Midfielder

Youth career
- Priština

Senior career*
Years	Team	Apps	(Gls)
1999–2000	Bečej	11	(0)
2000–2002	Sartid Smederevo	10	(0)
2002–2003	Slavija Sarajevo		
2004	Kryvbas Kryvyi Rih	9	(0)
2004	Slavija Sarajevo	9	(0)
2005	Hajduk Beograd	10	(1)
2005–2006	Vardar	14	(3)
2006–2007	Makedonija GP	24	(5)
2007–2010	Slavija Sarajevo	55	(6)
2010–2012	Sarajevo	47	(6)
2012–2016	Zrinjski Mostar	78	(6)
2017	Slavija Sarajevo	14	(6)
2017–2018	Olimpik Sarajevo	17	(2)
2018–2021	Slavija Sarajevo	62	(2)
Total		339	(37)

Managerial career
- 2021-2024: Sarajevo (academy)
- 2024-: Al Ahly Benghazi (asst.)
- * Club domestic league appearances and goals

Vučina Šćepanović (Serbian Cyrillic: Вучина Шћепановић; born 17 November 1982) is a Serbian retired footballer.

== Club career ==
He had previously played with Serbian clubs Priština, Bečej, Sartid Smederevo and Hajduk Beograd, Montenegrin Mogren, Bosnian sides Slavija Sarajevo, Olimpik and Zrinjski, Ukrainian Kryvbas Kryvyi Rih and Macedonian Makedonija Gjorče Petrov and Vardar Skopje.
