= Zoran Belošević =

Serbian footballer

Personal information
- Date of birth: 20 June 1983 (age 43)
- Place of birth: Zaječar, SFR Yugoslavia
- Height: 1.78 m (5 ft 10 in)
- Position: Left-back

Youth career
- Hajduk Veljko

Senior career*
Years	Team	Apps	(Gls)
2001–2003	Timok	49	(9)
2004	Politehnica Timișoara	3	(0)
2005	Kosanica	9	(0)
2005	Sevojno	13	(2)
2006	OFK Niš	13	(0)
2006–2007	Slavija Sarajevo	29	(2)
2007	Modriča	0	(0)
2008	Slavia Sofia	13	(0)
2008–2010	Sarajevo	57	(1)
2010	Universitatea Cluj	4	(0)
2011–2012	Sarajevo	54	(10)
2013	Pierikos	24	(0)
2013–2014	Zrinjski Mostar	14	(1)
2014	Napredak Kruševac	2	(0)
2015	Radnik Surdulica	4	(0)
2015	Milton SC		
2015	London City		
- * Club domestic league appearances and goals

Zoran Belošević (Serbian Cyrillic: Зоран Белошевић; born 20 June 1983) is a Serbian retired footballer who played as a defender.

== Career ==
Born in Zaječar, Belošević started out at Timok, before moving to Romanian club Politehnica Timișoara in the 2004 winter transfer window. He returned to his homeland after spending a year abroad and joined Kosanica until the end of the 2004–05 Serbian Second League. Following two brief spells at Sevojno and OFK Niš, Belošević moved to Bosnia and Herzegovina to play for Slavija Sarajevo and Modriča. When he played with Slavija he played in the 2007 UEFA Intertoto Cup.

In 2008, Belošević briefly played for Bulgarian club Slavia Sofia, before returning to Bosnia and Herzegovina to sign with Sarajevo. He spent two years at the club, earning a transfer to Universitatea Cluj in the summer of 2010. Six months later, Belošević moved back to his previous club Sarajevo. During his tenure with Sarajevo he featured in the 2009–10 UEFA Europa League, 2011–12 UEFA Champions League, and the 2012–13 UEFA Europa League.

In the 2013 winter transfer window, Belošević signed with Greek Football League club, Pierikos. He subsequently won the Premier League of Bosnia and Herzegovina with Zrinjski Mostar in the 2013–14 season. After returning to his native Serbia, Belošević played for Napredak Kruševac and Radnik Surdulica, helping the latter side win the 2014–15 Serbian First League.

In 2015, Belošević went overseas to play in the Canadian Soccer League with Milton SC, and later was transferred to London City midway through the season.

== Honours ==
Zrinjski Mostar

- Premier League of Bosnia and Herzegovina: 2013–14

Radnik Surdulica

- Serbian First League: 2014–15
