= Asmir Suljić =

Bosnian footballer (born 1991)

- Suljić playing for Szeged-Csanád in 2026

Personal information
- Date of birth: 11 September 1991 (age 35)
- Place of birth: Srebrenica, SFR Yugoslavia
- Height: 1.71 m (5 ft 7 in)
- Position: Winger

Team information
- Current team: Radnički 1923
- Number: 99

Youth career
- Butmir

Senior career*
| Years | Team | Apps | (Gls) |
| 2010–2013 | Sarajevo | 77 | (11) |
| 2013–2015 | Újpest | 50 | (4) |
| 2015–2018 | Videoton | 58 | (5) |
| 2018–2019 | Olimpija Ljubljana | 36 | (6) |
| 2019 | Zagłębie Lubin | 5 | (0) |
| 2019 | Zagłębie Lubin II | 2 | (0) |
| 2020–2021 | Maccabi Petah Tikva | 14 | (0) |
| 2021 | Diósgyőr | 22 | (3) |
| 2022–2023 | Sarajevo | 26 | (5) |
| 2023 | Tobol | 14 | (0) |
| 2023–2024 | Velež Mostar | 25 | (2) |
| 2024–2025 | Punjab | 23 | (4) |
| 2025–2026 | Szeged-Csanád | 17 | (0) |
| 2026– | Radnički 1923 | 0 | (0) |

International career
| 2012 | Bosnia and Herzegovina U21 | 1 | (0) |
- * Club domestic league appearances and goals as of 25 June 2026

Asmir Suljić (born 11 September 1991) is a Bosnian professional footballer who plays as a winger for Serbian Superliga club Radnički 1923.

== Club career ==
Suljić started his professional career at one of the biggest Bosnian-Herzegovinian clubs, Sarajevo, for whom he debuted in August 2010, aged 18. He quickly established himself as one of the best players in the league, earning himself nickname šejtan (the devil).

In 2013, he was transferred to Hungarian club Újpest.

At the end of August 2015, he switched clubs again, this time going to the reigning Hungarian champions Videoton.

In February 2018, he signed a two-year contract with Polish side Wisła Kraków, which was to enter into force on 1 July that year, but Suljić refused to play in Wisła and his contract was canceled in June 2018.

On 31 August 2024, it was officially announced by the Indian Super League club Punjab that they have signed Suljić on a one-year deal.

== International career ==
Suljić appeared in one game for Bosnia and Herzegovina under-21 team.

In March 2017, he acquired a Hungarian passport, making him eligible to play for Hungary.

== Career statistics ==
=== Club ===
As of match played 28 October 2017.

| Club | Season | League | | | National cup | | League cup | | Continental | | Other | | Total | |
| Club | Season | Division | Apps | Goals | Apps | Goals | Apps | Goals | Apps | Goals | Apps | Goals | Apps | Goals |
|---|---|---|---|---|---|---|---|---|---|---|---|---|---|---|
| Sarajevo | 2010–11 | Premijer Liga | 19 | 1 | 3 | 2 | — | | — | | — | | 22 | 3 |
| Sarajevo | 2011–12 | Premijer Liga | 26 | 5 | 4 | 1 | — | | 4 | 0 | — | | 34 | 6 |
| Sarajevo | 2012–13 | Premijer Liga | 26 | 3 | 2 | 0 | — | | 6 | 4 | — | | 34 | 7 |
| Sarajevo | 2013–14 | Premijer Liga | 6 | 2 | 0 | 0 | — | | 4 | 0 | — | | 10 | 2 |
| Sarajevo | Total | | 77 | 11 | 9 | 3 | — | | 14 | 4 | — | | 100 | 18 |
| Újpest | 2013–14 | Nemzeti Bajnokság I | 19 | 1 | 5 | 1 | 5 | 0 | — | | — | | 29 | 2 |
| Újpest | 2014–15 | Nemzeti Bajnokság I | 26 | 3 | 5 | 1 | 4 | 1 | — | | 1 (Note: Appearance in 2014 Szuperkupa) | 0 | 36 | 5 |
| Újpest | 2015–16 | Nemzeti Bajnokság I | 5 | 0 | 0 | 0 | — | | — | | — | | 5 | 0 |
| Újpest | Total | | 50 | 4 | 10 | 2 | 9 | 1 | — | | 1 | 0 | 70 | 7 |
| Videoton | 2015–16 | Nemzeti Bajnokság I | 24 | 2 | 5 | 0 | — | | — | | — | | 29 | 2 |
| Videoton | 2016–17 | Nemzeti Bajnokság I | 18 | 2 | 0 | 0 | — | | 6 | 1 | — | | 24 | 3 |
| Videoton | 2017–18 | Nemzeti Bajnokság I | 14 | 1 | 1 | 0 | — | | 7 | 0 | — | | 22 | 1 |
| Videoton | Total | | 56 | 5 | 6 | 0 | — | | 13 | 1 | — | | 75 | 6 |
| Career total | | | 183 | 20 | 25 | 5 | 9 | 1 | 27 | 5 | 1 | 0 | 245 | 31 |

== Honours ==
Újpest

- Magyar Kupa: 2013–14
- Szuperkupa: 2014

Videoton

- Hungarian League: 2017–18

Olimpija Ljubljana

- Slovenian Cup: 2018–19

Tobol

- Kazakhstan Cup: 2023
