= 2013–14 FK Borac Banja Luka season =

Borac Banja Luka
2013–14 season
- President: Srđan Šuput (until 31 March 2014); Draško Ilić
- Head coach: Dragan Jović (until 18 March 2014); Vinko Marinović
- Premijer liga BiH: 6th
- RS Cup: Round of 16
- BiH Cup: Round of 16
- Top goalscorer: League: Jovica Stokić (10); All: Jovica Stokić (10)
Home colours	Away colours

The 2013–14 season is FK Borac 4th season in Premier League of Bosnia and Herzegovina. This article shows player statistics and all matches (official and friendly) that the club have and will play during the 2013–14 season.

Borac placed sixth in the final league table.

== Players ==
=== Squad statistics ===
No.	Name	League		BiH Cup		RS Cup		Europe		Total		Discipline	
No.	Name	Apps	Goals	Apps	Goals	Apps	Goals	Apps	Goals	Apps	Goals	Yellow card	Red card
Goalkeepers
1	(Bosnia and Herzegovina) Asmir Avdukić	19	-18	1	-4	0	0	0	0	20	-22	0	0
30	(Bosnia and Herzegovina) Mladen Ilić	0	0	0	0	0	0	0	0	0	0	0	0
Defenders
12	(Bosnia and Herzegovina) Nebojša Runić	16	0	2	1	0	0	0	0	18	1	0	0
13	(Bosnia and Herzegovina) Siniša Dujaković	6+5	0	2+1	0	1	0	0	0	9+6	0	0	0
18	(Bosnia and Herzegovina) Aleksandar Subić	17	1	2	0	0	0	0	0	19	1	0	0
22	(Bosnia and Herzegovina) Draško Žarić	8+1	0	2	0	0	0	0	0	10+1	0	0	0
26	(Bosnia and Herzegovina) Dušan Komljenović	0	0	0	0	1	0	0	0	1	0	0	0
27	(Bosnia and Herzegovina) Miloš Perović	1+10	0	2	0	1	0	0	0	4+10	0	0	0
28	(Bosnia and Herzegovina) Aleksandar Kondić	2	0	1	1	1	0	0	0	4	1	0	0
Midfielders
4	(Bosnia and Herzegovina) Aleksandar Radulović	18	0	1+1	0	0	0	0	0	19+1	0	0	0
6	(Bosnia and Herzegovina) Dušan Stevandić	0+2	0	1	0	0	0	0	0	1+2	0	0	0
7	(Bosnia and Herzegovina) Momir Zečević	0	0	2	0	0	0	0	0	2	0	0	0
8	(Bosnia and Herzegovina) Mladen Žižović	18	2	1	0	0	0	0	0	19	2	0	0
11	(Bosnia and Herzegovina) Srđan Grahovac	16+1	1	2	0	0	0	0	0	18+1	1	0	0
16	(Bosnia and Herzegovina) Stefan Dujaković	2+16	1	2+1	1	1	1	0	0	5+17	3	0	0
17	(Bosnia and Herzegovina) Ognjen Đelmić	17+1	7	2	0	0	0	0	0	19+1	7	0	0
20	(Serbia) Igor Žuržinov	12+9	0	1+1	0	1	0	0	0	14+10	0	0	0
23	(Bosnia and Herzegovina) Vladan Grujić	18	0	0	0	0	0	0	0	18	0	0	0
24	(Bosnia and Herzegovina) Milan Šakić	0	0	1+1	0	1	0	0	0	1+2	0	0	0
Forwards
5	(Bosnia and Herzegovina) Vladimir Kremenović	0	0	0	0	0	0	0	0	0	0	0	0
10	(Bosnia and Herzegovina) Fedor Predragović	2+6	0	3	1	0	0	0	0	5+6	1	0	0
29	(Bosnia and Herzegovina) Igor Kuzmanović	0	0	1	0	0+1	0	0	0	1+1	0	0	0
Players sold or loaned out during the season
15	(Bosnia and Herzegovina) Boris Raspudić	15	0	0	0	1	0	0	0	16	0	0	0
14	(Bosnia and Herzegovina) Jovica Stokić	17	10	1	0	0	0	0	0	18	10	0	0
19	(Bosnia and Herzegovina) Ognjen Petrović	3+1	0	1	0	1	0	0	0	5+1	0	0	0
25	(Bosnia and Herzegovina) Dragan Đorđić	0	0	1	-1	1	-1	0	0	2	-2	0	0
21	(Bosnia and Herzegovina) Milan Sapardić	0	0	0+2	0	1	0	0	0	1+2	0	0	0

=== Top scorers ===
Includes all competitive matches. The list is sorted by shirt number when total goals are equal.

Position	Nation	Number	Name	League	Cup BiH	Cup RS	Europe	Total
1	(Bosnia and Herzegovina)	14	Stokić	10	0	0	0	10
2	(Bosnia and Herzegovina)	17	Đelmić	7	0	0	0	7
3	(Bosnia and Herzegovina)	16	St. Dujaković	1	1	1	0	3
4	(Bosnia and Herzegovina)	8	Žižović	2	0	0	0	2
5	(Bosnia and Herzegovina)	28	Kondić	0	1	0	0	1
=	(Bosnia and Herzegovina)	10	Predragović	0	1	0	0	1
=	(Bosnia and Herzegovina)	18	Subić	1	0	0	0	1
=	(Bosnia and Herzegovina)	11	Grahovac	1	0	0	0	1
=	(Bosnia and Herzegovina)	12	Runić	0	1	0	0	1

== Transfers ==
=== In ===
Date	Position	Name	From	Type
3 July 2013	MF	(Bosnia and Herzegovina) Ognjen Đelmić	(Bosnia and Herzegovina) Olimpic	Transfer
3 July 2013	FW	(Bosnia and Herzegovina) Fedor Predragović	Promoted from youth squad	Sign
3 July 2013	MF	(Bosnia and Herzegovina) Momir Žečević	Promoted from youth squad	Sign
3 July 2013	DF	(Bosnia and Herzegovina) Miloš Perović	Promoted from youth squad	Sign
3 July 2013	GK	(Bosnia and Herzegovina) Mladen Ilić	Promoted from youth squad	Sign
3 July 2013	FW	(Bosnia and Herzegovina) Milan Šakić	(Bosnia and Herzegovina) Sloboda Mrkonjić Grad	Loan Recall
12 July 2013	GK	(Bosnia and Herzegovina) Dragan Đorđić	(Bosnia and Herzegovina) Radnik Bijeljina	Unattached
30 July 2013	DF	(Bosnia and Herzegovina) Ognjen Petrović	(Serbia) Javor Ivanjica	Loan
5 August 2013	MF	(Serbia) Igor Žuržinov	Free agent	Sign
30 January 2014	MF	(Bosnia and Herzegovina) Boban Đerić	(Bosnia and Herzegovina) Leotar	Transfer
30 January 2014	DF	(Bosnia and Herzegovina) Darko Đajić	(Bosnia and Herzegovina) Leotar	Transfer
30 January 2014	MF	(Bosnia and Herzegovina) Stefan Savić	Promoted from youth squad	Sign
1 February 2014	MF	(Bosnia and Herzegovina) Nebojša Kodžoman	(Bosnia and Herzegovina) Laktaši	Unattached
2 February 2014	MF	(Serbia) Marko Basara	Free agent	Unattached
2 February 2014	DF	(Serbia) Marko Jevtić	(Bosnia and Herzegovina) Radnik Bijeljina	Unattached
3 February 2014	FW	(Bosnia and Herzegovina) Petar Kunić	(Czech Republic) Dukla	Loan

=== Out ===
Date	Position	Name	To	Type
14 June 2013	DF	(Serbia) Mladen Zeljković	(Bosnia and Herzegovina) Željezničar	Transfer
17 June 2013	FW	(Bosnia and Herzegovina) Nemanja Bilbija	(Serbia) Vojvodina	Loan return
19 June 2013	FW	(Bosnia and Herzegovina) Admir Raščić	(Hong Kong) Sun Pegasus	Transfer
19 June 2013	MF	(Bosnia and Herzegovina) Vedran Kantar	(Bosnia and Herzegovina) Zrinjski	Transfer
19 June 2013	MF	(Bosnia and Herzegovina) Dalibor Teinović	Unattached	Released
3 July 2013	GK	(Bosnia and Herzegovina) Mladen Lučić	(Bosnia and Herzegovina) Radnik Bijeljina	Loan
3 July 2013	GK	(Bosnia and Herzegovina) Siniša Marčetić	Unattached	Released
3 July 2013	GK	(Bosnia and Herzegovina) Dalibor Kozić	Unattached	Released
3 July 2013	DF	(Serbia) Milan Stupar	Unattached	Released
4 July 2013	MF	(Bosnia and Herzegovina) Darko Maletić	Unattached	Released
4 July 2013	DF	(Bosnia and Herzegovina) Vule Trivunović	Unattached	Released
4 August 2013	DF	(Bosnia and Herzegovina) Srđan Stojnić	(Germany) Astoria Walldorf	Transfer
5 January 2014	DF	(Bosnia and Herzegovina) Boris Raspudić	Brunei DPMM	Transfer
10 January 2014	FW	(Bosnia and Herzegovina) Jovica Stokić	(South Korea) Jeju United	Transfer
15 January 2014	DF	(Bosnia and Herzegovina) Ognjen Petrović	(Serbia) Javor Ivanjica	Loan return
16 January 2014	GK	(Bosnia and Herzegovina) Dragan Đorđić	Unattached	Released
20 January 2014	GK	(Bosnia and Herzegovina) Mladen Lučić	(Bosnia and Herzegovina) Slavija	Transfer
21 January 2014	MF	(Bosnia and Herzegovina) Milan Sapardić	Unattached	Released
31 January 2014	MF	(Bosnia and Herzegovina) Ognjen Đelmić	(Kazakhstan) Spartak Semey	Transfer

For recent transfers, see List of Bosnian football transfers summer 2013 and List of Bosnian football transfers winter 2013-14

== Tournaments ==
	Competition	Position
(Bosnia and Herzegovina)	Premier League of Bosnia and Herzegovina	
(Bosnia and Herzegovina)	Republika Srpska Cup	1/16
(Bosnia and Herzegovina)	Bosnia and Herzegovina Football Cup	1/16

=== League table ===
Pos	Team	Pld	W	D	L	GF	GA	GD	Pts	Qualification or relegation
4	Željezničar	30	16	9	5	51	29	+22	57	Qualification to Europa League first qualifying round
5	Velež	30	15	9	6	42	23	+19	54	
6	Borac Banja Luka	30	13	6	11	39	32	+7	45	
7	Čelik	30	10	13	7	35	32	+3	43	
8	Olimpic	30	10	11	9	39	30	+9	41	

Source: SportSport.ba (in Bosnian)
Rules for classification: 1st points; 2nd goal difference; 3rd goals scored
For deciding champions, qualification to UEFA Europa League and relegation: 1st points; 2nd head-to-head points; 3rd head-to-head goal difference; 4th head-to-head goals scored; 5th head-to-head away goals scored; 6th goal difference; 7th goals scored.

==== Results and positions by round ====
Round	1	2	3	4	5	6	7	8	9	10	11	12	13	14	15	16	17	18	19	20	21	22	23	24	25	26	27	28	29	30
Ground	A	H	A	H	A	H	A	H	A	H	A	H	A	H	A	H	A	H	A	H	A	H	A	H	A	H	A	H	A	H
Result	D	W	D	W	W	W	L	W	W	W	W	D	L	W	W	D	L	L	L											
Position	5	4	6	5	1	1	3	1	1	1	1	1	1	1	1	1	1	2	5											

A = Away; H = Home; W = Win; D = Draw; L = Loss

==== Matches ====
Date	Round	Opponents	Ground	Result	Scorers
27 July 2013	1	Čelik Zenica	A	1 – 1	Stokić 45' (pen.)
3 August 2013	2	Vitez	H	1 – 0	Stokić 68' (pen.)
11 August 2013	3	Olimpic	A	1 – 1	Đelmić 5'
17 August 2013	4	Željezničar	H	2 – 1	Đelmić 18', 30'
24 August 2013	5	Mladost (VO)	A	3 – 2	Đelmić 25', Stokić 50', 51'
31 August 2013	6	Radnik Bijeljina	H	2 – 0	St. Dujaković 30', Đelmić 77'
15 September 2013	7	Velež	A	0 – 3	
21 September 2013	8	Zrinjski	H	2 – 0	Stokić 44', Đelmić 75'
25 September 2013	9	Sarajevo	A	3 – 0	
28 September 2013	10	Slavija	H	2 – 0	Stokić 10', Subić 60'
5 October 2013	11	Rudar Prijedor	A	2 – 1	Grahovac 35', Stokić 78'
19 October 2013	12	Široki Brijeg	H	2 – 2	Đelmić 7', Stokić 34'
26 October 2013	13	Zvijezda Gradačac	A	0 – 1	
30 October 2013	14	Leotar	H	1 – 0	Žižović 55'
2 November 2013	15	Travnik	A	2 – 1	Žižović 45', Stokić 65'
9 November 2013	16	Čelik Zenica	H	0 – 0	
18 November 2013	17	Vitez	A	1 – 3	Stokić 40'
24 November 2013	18	Olimpic	H	0 – 1	
30 November 2013	19	Željezničar	A	0 – 1	
1 March 2014	20	Mladost (VO)	H	0 – 1	
8 March 2014	21	Radnik Bijeljina	A	1 – 2	

=== Republika Srpska Cup ===
Date	Round	Opponents	Ground	Result	Scorers
2 October 2013	1/16	Rudar Prijedor	A	1 – 1	St. Dujaković 45'

=== Bosnia and Herzegovina Football Cup ===
Borac Banja Luka will participate in the 10th Bosnia and Herzegovina Football Cup starting in the Round of 32.

Date	Round	Opponents	Ground	Result	Scorers
17 September 2013	First Round	Drina HE	H	3 – 0	St. Dujaković 71, Kondić 81', Predragović 83'
22 October 2013	Second Round	Zrinjski	A	0 – 4	
6 November 2013	Second Round	Zrinjski	H	1 – 1	Runić 73'

== Friendlies ==
Date	Opponents	Result	Scorers
8 July 2013	(Bosnia and Herzegovina) Modriča	2 – 0	St. Dujaković 60', Šakić 66'
13 July 2013	(Bosnia and Herzegovina) Zvijezda Gradačac	0 – 0	
14 July 2013	(Bosnia and Herzegovina) Sloboda (MG)	1 – 1	Grujić 90'
20 July 2013	(Bosnia and Herzegovina) Sloboda (MG)	1 – 2	Raspudić 88'
21 July 2013	(Bosnia and Herzegovina) Naprijed (BL)	0 – 0	
24 July 2013	(Bosnia and Herzegovina) Sloga Srbac	6 – 0	Žižović 8', Vrhovac (o.g) 15', Stokić 47',53', St. Dujaković 67', Kremenović 69'
7 September 2013	(Serbia) OFK Beograd	1 – 2	St. Dujaković 89'
25 January 2014	(Bosnia and Herzegovina) Kozara Gradiška	2 – 1	Grujić 45', Leković 86'
1 February 2014	(Bosnia and Herzegovina) Krupa na Vrbasu	1 – 0	Predragović
5 February 2014	(Croatia) Pomorac	0 – 2	
7 February 2014	(Bosnia and Herzegovina) Željezničar	3 – 1	Bogdanović (og) 35', Grahovac 55', St. Dujaković 85'
9 February 2014	(Bosnia and Herzegovina) Zvijezda Gradačac	0 – 3	
10 February 2014	(Slovenia) Olimpija Ljubljana	1 – 1	Zafirović (og) 45'
