= 2014–15 FK Borac Banja Luka season =

Borac Banja Luka
2014–15 season
- President: Draško Ilić
- Head coach: Vinko Marinović
- Premijer liga BiH: Current
- RS Cup: Current
- BiH Cup: Current
Home colours	Away colours

The 2014–15 season is FK Borac 5th season in Premier League of Bosnia and Herzegovina. This article shows player statistics and all matches (official and friendly) that the club have and will play during the 2014–15 season.

== Players ==
=== Squad statistics ===
No.	Name	League		BiH Cup		RS Cup		Europe		Total		Discipline	
No.	Name	Apps	Goals	Apps	Goals	Apps	Goals	Apps	Goals	Apps	Goals	Yellow card	Red card
Goalkeepers
1	(Bosnia and Herzegovina) Asmir Avdukić	0	0	0	0	0	0	0	0	0	0	0	0
30	(Bosnia and Herzegovina) Mladen Ilić	0	0	0	0	0	0	0	0	0	0	0	0
TBA	(Bosnia and Herzegovina) Branislav Ružić	0	0	0	0	0	0	0	0	0	0	0	0
Defenders
5	(Serbia) Marko Jevtić	0	0	0	0	0	0	0	0	0	0	0	0
12	(Bosnia and Herzegovina) Nebojša Runić	0	0	0	0	0	0	0	0	0	0	0	0
13	(Bosnia and Herzegovina) Siniša Dujaković	0	0	0	0	0	0	0	0	0	0	0	0
18	(Bosnia and Herzegovina) Aleksandar Subić	0	0	0	0	0	0	0	0	0	0	0	0
22	(Bosnia and Herzegovina) Draško Žarić	0	0	0	0	0	0	0	0	0	0	0	0
26	(Bosnia and Herzegovina) Dušan Komljenović	0	0	0	0	1	0	0	0	1	0	0	0
27	(Bosnia and Herzegovina) Miloš Perović	0	0	0	0	0	0	0	0	0	0	0	0
TBA	(Bosnia and Herzegovina) Aleksandar Kondić	0	0	0	0	0	0	0	0	0	0	0	0
Midfielders
7	(Bosnia and Herzegovina) Momir Zečević	0	0	0	0	0	0	0	0	0	0	0	0
8	(Bosnia and Herzegovina) Mladen Žižović	0	0	0	0	0	0	0	0	0	0	0	0
11	(Bosnia and Herzegovina) Srđan Grahovac	0	0	0	0	0	0	0	0	0	0	0	0
20	(Serbia) Igor Žuržinov	0	0	0	0	0	0	0	0	0	0	0	0
23	(Bosnia and Herzegovina) Vladan Grujić	0	0	0	0	0	0	0	0	0	0	0	0
24	(Bosnia and Herzegovina) Milan Šakić	0	0	0	0	0	0	0	0	0	0	0	0
Forwards
10	(Bosnia and Herzegovina) Fedor Predragović	2+6	0	3	1	0	0	0	0	5+6	1	0	0
29	(Bosnia and Herzegovina) Igor Kuzmanović	0	0	1	0	0	0	0	0	0	0	0	0
TBA	(Bosnia and Herzegovina) Jovica Stokić	0	0	0	0	0	0	0	0	0	0	0	0
Players sold or loaned out during the season

=== Top scorers ===
Includes all competitive matches. The list is sorted by shirt number when total goals are equal.

Position	Nation	Number	Name	League	Cup BiH	Cup RS	Europe	Total

== Transfers ==
=== In ===
Date	Position	Name	From	Type
10 June 2014	DF	(Bosnia and Herzegovina) Borislav Pilipović	(Croatia) Istra 1961	Unattached
16 June 2014	MF	(Bosnia and Herzegovina) Mihajlo Savanović	(Bosnia and Herzegovina) Sloboda M. Grad	Unattached
16 June 2014	MF	(Bosnia and Herzegovina) Bojan Kremenović	(Bosnia and Herzegovina) Sloboda M. Grad	Unattached
16 June 2014	FW	(Bosnia and Herzegovina) Aleksandar Malbašić	(Bosnia and Herzegovina) Jedinstvo Bihać	Transfer
20 July 2014	DF	(Serbia) Srđan Bečelić	(Montenegro) Sutjeska Nikšić	Transfer
20 July 2014	MF	(Bosnia and Herzegovina) Uglješa Radinović	(Bosnia and Herzegovina) Rudar Prijedor	Unattached

=== Out ===
Date	Position	Name	To	Type
1 July 2014	MF	(Bosnia and Herzegovina) Srđan Grahovac	(Austria) Rapid Wien	Transfer
2 July 2014	FW	(Bosnia and Herzegovina) Haris Handžić	(Russia) Ufa	Transfer
10 July 2014	DF	(Serbia) Marko Jevtić	(Bosnia and Herzegovina) Drina Zvornik	Unattached
11 July 2014	MF	(Bosnia and Herzegovina) Aleksandar Radulović	(Bosnia and Herzegovina) Zrinjski Mostar	Unattached
18 July 2014	MF	(Bosnia and Herzegovina) Dušan Stevandić	(Bosnia and Herzegovina) Sloboda M. Grad	Loan
18 July 2014	MF	(Bosnia and Herzegovina) Stefan Dujaković	(Bosnia and Herzegovina) GOŠK	Loan
18 July 2014	MF	(Bosnia and Herzegovina) Stefan Dujaković	(Bosnia and Herzegovina) GOŠK	Loan
