= 2011–12 Kecskeméti TE season =

Kecskeméti TE
2011–12 season
- Chairmen: (Hungary) Pál Rózsa (Hungary) János Versegi
- Manager: (Serbia) Tomislav Sivić (until 23 November 2011) (Hungary) István Szabó
- NB 1: 5.
- UEFA Europa League: Second qualifying round
- Hungarian Cup: Round of 16
- Hungarian League Cup: Runners-up
- Top goalscorer: League: (Hungary) László Lencse (15); All: (Hungary) László Lencse (18)
- Highest home attendance: 6,000 v Ferencváros (25 September 2011); 6,000 v Diósgyőr (4 March 2012)
- Lowest home attendance: 300 v Paks (12 October 2011)
Home colours	Away colours

The 2011–12 season will be Kecskeméti TE's 4th competitive season, 4th consecutive season in the OTP Bank Liga and 100th year in existence as a football club.

== First team squad ==
Note: Flags indicate national team as defined under FIFA eligibility rules; some limited exceptions apply. Players may hold more than one non-FIFA nationality.

No.	Pos.	Nation	Player
2	DF	HUN	Balázs Koszó
4	DF	HUN	Róbert Varga
6	DF	HUN	Béla Balogh
7	MF	SRB	Aleksandar Alempijević
8	MF	HUN	Zsolt Patvaros
9	FW	HUN	Marcell Balog
10	MF	MNE	Vladan Savić
13	DF	HUN	Krisztián Póti
14	MF	SRB	Vladan Čukić
15	DF	ROU	Attila Gyagya
18	MF	CGO	Francis Litsingi
19	FW	HUN	Ádám Hegedűs

No.	Pos.	Nation	Player
20	FW	HUN	Zoltán Puskás
21	MF	HUN	Gábor Bori
22	DF	HUN	Dávid Mohl
23	DF	HUN	Gyula Forró
26	MF	HUN	Lajos Bertus
29	FW	HUN	László Lencse (on loan from Videoton FC)
33	GK	HUN	Gábor Németh
55	FW	HUN	Attila Tököli
77	FW	HUN	László Pekár
77	FW	HUN	Gergő Máté
88	DF	HUN	Viktor Tölgyesi
99	GK	HUN	Botond Antal

== Transfers ==
=== Summer ===
In: Note: Flags indicate national team as defined under FIFA eligibility rules; some limited exceptions apply. Players may hold more than one non-FIFA nationality.

No.	Pos.	Nation	Player
3	DF	BRA	Robson de Souza (loan return from Mezőkövesd-Zsóry SE)
9	FW	HUN	Attila Simon (loan return from Zalaegerszegi TE)
11	MF	BIH	Jovica Stokić (from (Bosnia and Herzegovina) NK Zvijezda Gradačac)
22	DF	HUN	Dávid Mohl (from Debreceni VSC)
22	MF	HUN	István Bagi (loan return from Mezőkövesd-Zsóry SE)
24	FW	HUN	Gábor Urbán (from MTK Budapest FC)
25	DF	NED	Kelvin Maynard (from (Portugal) S.C. Olhanense)
27	MF	HUN	Ádám Gyurcsó (loan from Videoton FC)
29	FW	HUN	László Lencse (loan from Videoton FC)
33	GK	HUN	Gábor Németh (from Vasas SC)
––	FW	CAN	Igor Pisanjuk (from (Canada) Mississauga Eagles FC)

Out: Note: Flags indicate national team as defined under FIFA eligibility rules; some limited exceptions apply. Players may hold more than one non-FIFA nationality.

No.	Pos.	Nation	Player
1	GK	HUN	Zoltán Tóth (to Szolnoki MÁV FC)
3	DF	BRA	Robson de Souza (loan to Ceglédi VSE)
5	DF	HUN	István Farkas (to Ceglédi VSE)
9	FW	MNE	Goran Vujovic (loan return to Videoton FC)
19	FW	CIV	Sindou Dosso (loan to (Israel) Hapoel Ironi Rishon LeZion F.C.)
31	DF	HUN	Csaba Preklet (loan return to (Italy) Reggina Calcio)
55	FW	HUN	Attila Tököli (loan to Zalaegerszegi TE)

=== Winter ===
In: Note: Flags indicate national team as defined under FIFA eligibility rules; some limited exceptions apply. Players may hold more than one non-FIFA nationality.

No.	Pos.	Nation	Player
4	DF	HUN	Róbert Varga (from Zalaegerszegi TE)
9	FW	HUN	Marcell Balog (loan return from Ceglédi VSE)
20	MF	HUN	Balázs Sarus (from Nyíregyháza Spartacus)
22	MF	HUN	István Bagi (loan return from Mezőkövesd-Zsóry SE)
55	FW	HUN	Attila Tököli (loan return from Zalaegerszegi TE)
83	GK	HUN	Csaba Borszéki (from Dunakanyar-Vác FC)

Out: Note: Flags indicate national team as defined under FIFA eligibility rules; some limited exceptions apply. Players may hold more than one non-FIFA nationality.

No.	Pos.	Nation	Player
4	DF	SRB	Siniša Radanović (to (Serbia) FK Borac Čačak)
9	FW	HUN	Attila Simon (to BFC Siófok)
11	FW	BIH	Jovica Stokić (to (Serbia) FK BSK Borča)
16	DF	HUN	Pál Urbán (to Dunaújváros Pálhalma SE)
17	MF	CGO	Christian Ebala (on loan to (Kazakhstan) FC Astana)
20	MF	CTA	Foxi Kethevoama (on loan to (Kazakhstan) FC Astana)
22	MF	HUN	István Bagi (to Mezőkövesd-Zsóry SE)
23	FW	CAN	Igor Pisanjuk (to Egri FC)
24	FW	HUN	Gábor Urbán (to Szigetszentmiklósi TK)
25	DF	NED	Kelvin Maynard
27	MF	HUN	Ádám Gyurcsó (loan return to Videoton FC)
28	GK	SVK	Ladislav Rybánsky (to BFC Siófok)
92	MF	HUN	András Farkas

- List of Hungarian football transfer summer 2011
- List of Hungarian football transfers winter 2011–12

== Statistics ==
=== Appearances and goals ===
Last updated on 27 May 2012.

No.	Pos	Nat	Player	Total		OTP Bank Liga		Europa League		Hungarian Cup		League Cup	
No.	Pos	Nat	Player	Apps	Goals	Apps	Goals	Apps	Goals	Apps	Goals	Apps	Goals
2	DF	(Hungary) HUN	Balázs Koszó	30	0	20	0	0	0	2	0	8	0
4	DF	(Hungary) HUN	Róbert Varga	14	0	11	0	0	0	0	0	3	0
6	DF	(Hungary) HUN	Béla Balogh	36	0	26	0	2	0	0	0	8	0
7	MF	(Serbia) SRB	Aleksandar Alempijević	22	2	13	1	2	0	0	0	7	1
8	MF	(Hungary) HUN	Zsolt Patvaros	13	0	5	0	0	0	2	0	6	0
9	FW	(Hungary) HUN	Marcell Balog	8	0	5	0	0	0	0	0	3	0
10	MF	(Montenegro) MNE	Vladan Savić	40	5	28	4	2	0	2	0	8	1
13	DF	(Hungary) HUN	Krisztián Póti	3	0	2	0	0	0	0	0	1	0
14	MF	(Serbia) SRB	Vladan Čukić	39	1	25	0	2	0	3	0	9	1
15	DF	(Romania) ROU	Attila Gyagya	22	0	13	0	0	0	3	0	6	0
18	MF	(Republic of the Congo) CGO	Francis Litsingi	32	9	21	4	2	0	2	0	7	5
19	FW	(Hungary) HUN	Ádám Hegedűs	14	0	5	0	0	0	2	0	7	0
20	FW	(Hungary) HUN	Zoltán Puskás	1	0	1	0	0	0	0	0	0	0
21	MF	(Hungary) HUN	Gábor Bori	31	3	19	1	1	0	2	1	9	1
22	DF	(Hungary) HUN	Dávid Mohl	35	3	24	1	2	0	1	1	8	1
23	DF	(Hungary) HUN	Gyula Forró	11	0	7	0	0	0	2	0	2	0
26	MF	(Hungary) HUN	Lajos Bertus	32	4	23	3	1	0	2	0	6	1
29	FW	(Hungary) HUN	László Lencse	31	18	21	15	0	0	3	0	7	3
33	GK	(Hungary) HUN	Gábor Németh	25	-36	21	-28	1	-1	1	-2	2	-5
55	FW	(Hungary) HUN	Attila Tököli	19	7	14	4	1	0	0	0	4	3
77	FW	(Hungary) HUN	László Pekár	21	2	11	1	0	0	1	0	9	1
77	FW	(Hungary) HUN	Gergő Máté	1	0	1	0	0	0	0	0	0	0
88	DF	(Hungary) HUN	Viktor Tölgyesi	12	0	7	0	0	0	2	0	3	0
99	GK	(Hungary) HUN	Botond Antal	14	-13	5	-3	0	0	2	-3	7	-7
Youth players
2	DF	(Hungary) HUN	György Szabó	2	0	0	0	0	0	0	0	2	0
––	MF	(Hungary) HUN	Máté Mihalkó	1	0	0	0	0	0	0	0	1	0
Players currently out on loan
17	MF	(Cameroon) CMR	Christian Bodiong Ebala	13	0	9	0	2	0	0	0	2	0
19	FW	(Ivory Coast) CIV	Sindou Dosso	4	1	2	1	2	0	0	0	0	0
20	MF	(Central African Republic) CTA	Foxi Kethevoama	22	6	16	5	2	0	3	1	1	0
Players no longer at the club
4	DF	(Serbia) SRB	Siniša Radanović	20	2	13	1	2	1	1	0	4	0
9	FW	(Hungary) HUN	Attila Simon	9	3	4	1	1	0	0	0	4	2
11	FW	(Bosnia and Herzegovina) BIH	Jovica Stokić	15	4	10	2	0	0	1	2	4	0
16	DF	(Hungary) HUN	Pál Urbán	8	0	2	0	0	0	1	0	5	0
23	MF	(Canada) CAN	Igor Pisanjuk	2	0	0	0	0	0	0	0	2	0
24	FW	(Hungary) HUN	Gábor Urbán	7	0	1	0	0	0	1	0	5	0
25	DF	(Netherlands) NED	Kelvin Maynard	13	1	8	0	0	0	1	0	4	1
27	MF	(Hungary) HUN	Ádám Gyurcsó	23	4	16	4	2	0	3	0	2	0
28	GK	(Slovakia) SVK	Ladislav Rybánsky	8	-11	5	-7	1	0	0	0	2	-4
92	MF	(Hungary) HUN	András Farkas	4	0	0	0	0	0	0	0	4	0

=== Top scorers ===
Includes all competitive matches. The list is sorted by shirt number when total goals are equal.

Last updated on 27 May 2012

Position	Nation	Number	Name	OTP Bank Liga	Europea League	Hungarian Cup	League Cup	Total
1	(Hungary)	29	László Lencse	15	0	0	3	18
2	(Republic of the Congo)	18	Francis Litsingi	4	0	0	5	9
3	(Hungary)	55	Attila Tököli	4	0	0	3	7
4	(Central African Republic)	20	Foxi Kethevoama	5	0	1	0	6
5	(Montenegro)	10	Vladan Savić	4	0	0	1	5
6	(Hungary)	27	Ádám Gyurcsó	4	0	0	0	4
7	(Hungary)	26	Lajos Bertus	3	0	0	1	4
8	(Bosnia and Herzegovina)	11	Jovica Stokić	2	0	2	0	4
9	(Hungary)	22	Dávid Mohl	1	0	1	1	3
10	(Hungary)	21	Gábor Bori	1	0	1	1	3
11	(Hungary)	9	Attila Simon	1	0	0	2	3
12	(Serbia)	4	Siniša Radanović	1	1	0	0	2
13	(Serbia)	7	Aleksandar Alempijević	1	0	0	1	2
14	(Hungary)	77	László Pekár	1	0	0	1	2
15	(Ivory Coast)	19	Sindou Dosso	1	0	0	0	1
16	(Serbia)	14	Vladan Čukić	0	0	0	1	1
17	(Netherlands)	25	Kelvin Maynard	0	0	0	1	1
/	/	/	Own Goals	0	0	0	0	0
			TOTALS	48	1	5	21	75

=== Disciplinary record ===
Includes all competitive matches. Players with 1 card or more included only.

Last updated on 27 May 2012

Position	Nation	Number	Name	OTP Bank Liga		Europea League		Hungarian Cup		League Cup		Total (Hu Total)	
Position	Nation	Number	Name	Booked	Sent off (straight red)	Booked	Sent off (straight red)	Booked	Sent off (straight red)	Booked	Sent off (straight red)	Booked	Sent off (straight red)
DF	(Hungary)	2	Balázs Koszó	2	0	0	0	0	0	1	0	3 (2)	0 (0)
DF	(Hungary)	4	Róbert Varga	4	0	0	0	0	0	0	0	4 (4)	0 (0)
DF	(Serbia)	4	Siniša Radanović	6	0	1	0	0	0	1	1	8 (6)	1 (0)
DF	(Hungary)	6	Béla Balogh	5	1	0	0	0	0	3	0	8 (5)	1 (1)
MF	(Serbia)	7	Aleksandar Alempijević	5	0	1	0	0	0	3	0	9 (5)	0 (0)
FW	(Hungary)	9	Marcell Balog	1	0	0	0	0	0	0	0	1 (1)	0 (0)
MF	(Montenegro)	10	Vladan Savić	7	0	1	0	0	0	1	0	9 (7)	0 (0)
MF	(Bosnia and Herzegovina)	11	Jovica Stokić	0	0	0	0	0	0	0	1	0 (0)	1 (0)
MF	(Serbia)	14	Vladan Čukić	9	0	0	0	2	0	5	0	16 (9)	0 (0)
DF	(Romania)	15	Attila Gyagya	3	0	0	0	1	0	0	0	4 (3)	0 (0)
DF	(Hungary)	16	Pál Urbán	2	0	0	0	0	0	0	0	2 (2)	0 (0)
MF	(Cameroon)	17	Christian Bodiong Ebala	2	0	0	0	0	0	1	0	3 (2)	0 (0)
MF	(Republic of the Congo)	18	Francis Litsingi	3	0	1	0	0	0	1	0	5 (3)	0 (0)
MF	(Central African Republic)	20	Foxi Kethevoama	4	0	0	0	1	0	0	0	5 (4)	0 (0)
MF	(Hungary)	21	Gábor Bori	5	0	1	0	0	0	0	0	6 (5)	0 (0)
DF	(Hungary)	22	Dávid Mohl	6	2	1	0	0	1	0	0	7 (6)	3 (2)
DF	(Hungary)	23	Gyula Forró	1	0	0	0	0	0	0	0	1 (1)	0 (0)
FW	(Hungary)	24	Gábor Urbán	0	0	0	0	1	0	0	0	1 (0)	0 (0)
DF	(Netherlands)	25	Kelvin Maynard	2	0	0	0	0	0	0	0	2 (2)	0 (0)
MF	(Hungary)	26	Lajos Bertus	3	0	0	0	0	0	0	0	3 (3)	0 (0)
FW	(Hungary)	27	Ádám Gyurcsó	2	0	1	0	0	0	0	0	3 (2)	0 (0)
GK	(Slovakia)	28	Ladislav Rybánsky	2	0	0	0	0	0	0	0	2 (2)	0 (0)
FW	(Hungary)	29	László Lencse	2	0	0	0	0	0	1	1	3 (2)	1 (0)
FW	(Hungary)	55	Attila Tököli	2	0	0	0	0	0	1	0	3 (2)	0 (0)
FW	(Hungary)	77	László Pekár	1	1	0	0	0	0	0	0	1 (1)	1 (1)
DF	(Hungary)	88	Viktor Tölgyesi	2	0	0	0	0	0	0	0	2 (2)	0 (0)
GK	(Hungary)	99	Botond Antal	1	0	0	0	0	0	0	0	1 (1)	0 (0)
			TOTALS	82	4	7	0	5	1	18	3	112 (82)	8 (4)

=== Overall ===
Games played	46 (30 OTP Bank Liga, 2 UEFA Europa League, 3 Hungarian Cup and 11 Hungarian League Cup)
Games won	20 (13 OTP Bank Liga, 0 UEFA Europa League, 1 Hungarian Cup and 6 Hungarian League Cup)
Games drawn	12 (6 OTP Bank Liga, 2 UEFA Europa League, 1 Hungarian Cup and 3 Hungarian League Cup)
Games lost	14 (11 OTP Bank Liga, 0 UEFA Europa League, 1 Hungarian Cup and 2 Hungarian League Cup)
Goals scored	75
Goals conceded	60
Goal difference	+15
Yellow cards	112
Red cards	8
Worst discipline	(Serbia) Vladan Čukić (16 (yellow card) , 0 (red card) )
Best result	4–0 (H) v Kaposvári Rákóczi FC - OTP Bank Liga - 24-07-2011
Best result	4–0 (H) v Debreceni VSC - Ligakupa - 28-03-2012
Worst result	0–4 (A) v Győri ETO FC - OTP Bank Liga - 30-09-2011
Most appearances	(Montenegro) Vladan Savić (40 appearances)
Top scorer	(Hungary) László Lencse (18 goal)
Points	72/138 (52.17%)

Last updated: 27 May 2012

== Nemzeti Bajnokság I ==
=== Matches ===
17 July 2011 1	Paksi SE	3–2	Kecskeméti TE	Paks, Tolna County
19:00 CET (UTC+01)	Hrepka 16'; Bartha 49'; Böde 74'	(Report)	Stokić 30'; Simon 90'	Stadium: Stadion PSE; Attendance: 1,500; Referee: (Hungary) Péter Solymosi

24 July 2011 2	Kecskeméti TE	4–0	Kaposvári Rákóczi FC	Kecskemét, Bács-Kiskun County
19:00 CET (UTC+01)	Foxi 10' 13'; Savić 31' (pen.); Gyurcsó 53'	(Report)		Stadium: Széktói Stadion; Attendance: 2,700; Referee: (Hungary) Roland Veizer

31 July 2011 3	Diósgyőri VTK	1–2	Kecskeméti TE	Miskolc, Borsod-Abaúj-Zemplén County
16:00 CET (UTC+01)	Budovinszky 28'	(Report)	Tököli 30'; Dosso 89'	Stadium: DVTK Stadion; Attendance: 7,000; Referee: (Hungary) Ádám Farkas

7 August 2011 4	Kecskeméti TE	0–1	Debreceni VSC	Kecskemét, Bács-Kiskun County
19:00 CET (UTC+01)		(Report)	Bódi 90+1'	Stadium: Széktói Stadion; Attendance: 4,000; Referee: (Chile) Alvaro Miquel Garcia

13 August 2011 5	Pécsi Mecsek FC	2–2	Kecskeméti TE	Pécs, Baranya County
19:00 CET (UTC+01)	Bajzát 21'; Todorović 24'	(Report)	Gyurcsó 36' 85'	Stadium: Stadion PMFC; Attendance: 4,000; Referee: (Hungary) Zoltán Iványi

20 August 2011 6	Kecskeméti TE	3–1	Budapest Honvéd FC	Kecskemét, Bács-Kiskun County
19:00 CET (UTC+01)	Gyurcsó 37'; Litsingi 47'; Foxi 83'	(Report)	Danilo 8' (pen.)	Stadium: Széktói Stadion; Attendance: 2,500; Referee: (Hungary) Roland Veizer

28 August 2011 7	Szombathelyi Haladás	2–2	Kecskeméti TE	Szombathely, Vas County
18:00 CET (UTC+01)	Vujović 19'; Balogh 73' (o.g.)	(Report)	Bertus 21'; Mohl 78'	Stadium: Rohonci Street Stadium; Attendance: 5,500; Referee: (Hungary) István Vad

10 September 2011 8	Kecskeméti TE	1–1	Vasas SC	Kecskemét, Bács-Kiskun County
19:00 CET (UTC+01)	Lencse 43'	(Report)	Mehmedagić 83'	Stadium: Széktói Stadion; Attendance: 4,000; Referee: (Hungary) Zoltán J. Kovács

17 September 2011 9	Zalaegerszegi TE	1–1	Kecskeméti TE	Zalaegerszeg, Zala County
16:00 CET (UTC+01)	Balázs 40'	(Report)	Lencse 11'	Stadium: ZTE Arena; Attendance: 3,000; Referee: (Hungary) Mihály Fábián

25 September 2011 10	Kecskeméti TE	1–0	Ferencvárosi TC	Kecskemét, Bács-Kiskun County
16:00 CET (UTC+01)	Lencse 33'	(Report)		Stadium: Széktói Stadion; Attendance: 6,000; Referee: (Hungary) Péter Solymosi

30 September 2011 11	Győri ETO FC	4–0	Kecskeméti TE	Győr, Győr-Moson-Sopron County
18:00 CET (UTC+01)	Dudás 12' (pen.) 41'; Trajković 83' 90+1'	(Report)		Stadium: ETO Park; Attendance: 4,000; Referee: (Hungary) Ádám Németh

15 October 2011 12	Videoton FC	0–2	Kecskeméti TE	Székesfehérvár, Fejér County
17:30 CET (UTC+01)		(Report)	Radanović 56'; Savić 67'	Stadium: Stadion Sóstói; Attendance: 2,788; Referee: (Hungary) István Vad

22 October 2011 13	Kecskeméti TE	3–0	Lombard-Pápa TFC	Kecskemét, Bács-Kiskun County
17:30 CET (UTC+01)	Stokić 18'; Bori 33'; Savić 64' (pen.)	(Report)		Stadium: Széktói Stadion; Attendance: 2,500; Referee: (Hungary) Zoltán Iványi

29 October 2011 14	Újpest FC	3–1	Kecskeméti TE	Budapest, Pest County
17:30 CET (UTC+01)	Kovács 38'; Rajczi 87' (pen.); Balajti 90+2'	(Report)	Foxi 66'	Stadium: Szusza Ferenc Stadium; Attendance: 2,000; Referee: (Hungary) Tamás Bognár

5 November 2011 15	Kecskeméti TE	3–2	BFC Siófok	Kecskemét, Bács-Kiskun County
16:00 CET (UTC+01)	Foxi 22'; Litsingi 48'; Lencse 59'	(Report)	Haraszti 21'; Tusori 45'	Stadium: Széktói Stadion; Attendance: 2,000; Referee: (Hungary) Balázs Berke

19 November 2011 16	Kecskeméti TE	0–1	Paksi SE	Kecskemét, Bács-Kiskun County
16:00 CET (UTC+01)		(Report)	Éger 77' (pen.)	Stadium: Széktói Stadion; Attendance: 2,000; Referee: (Hungary) Ádám Farkas

26 November 2011 17	Kaposvári Rákóczi FC	2–1	Kecskeméti TE	Kaposvár, Somogy County
16:00 CET (UTC+01)	Balázs 37'; Graszl 63'	(Report)	Lencse 48'	Stadium: Stadion Kaposvár Rákóczi; Attendance: 2,000; Referee: (Hungary) Zsolt Szabó

4 March 2012 18	Kecskeméti TE	1–0	Diósgyőri VTK	Kecskemét, Bács-Kiskun County
16:00 CET (UTC+01)	Tököli 2' (pen.)	(Report)		Stadium: Széktói Stadion; Attendance: 6,000; Referee: (Hungary) Viktor Kassai

10 March 2012 19	Debreceni VSC	2–1	Kecskeméti TE	Debrecen, Hajdú-Bihar County
17:30 CET (UTC+01)	Szakály 15'; Nagy 90+1'	(Report)	Bertus 40'	Stadium: Stadion Oláh Gábor Út; Attendance: 5,000; Referee: (Hungary) Gábor Oláh

17 March 2012 20	Kecskeméti TE	1–2	Pécsi Mecsek FC	Kecskemét, Bács-Kiskun County
16:00 CET (UTC+01)	Lencse 1'	(Report)	Horváth 5'; Andorka 11'	Stadium: Széktói Stadion; Attendance: 2,000; Referee: (Hungary) János Takács

23 March 2012 21	Budapest Honvéd FC	1–4	Kecskeméti TE	Budapest, Pest County
18:00 CET (UTC+01)	Faggyas 70'	(Report)	Lencse 40' 48' 84'; Savić 63'	Stadium: Bozsik Stadion; Attendance: 1,000; Referee: (Hungary) István Vad

31 March 2012 22	Kecskeméti TE	2–2	Szombathelyi Haladás	Kecskemét, Bács-Kiskun County
16:00 CET (UTC+01)	Lencse 26' (pen.); Tököli 75'	(Report)	Kenesei 35'; Nagy 72'	Stadium: Széktói Stadion; Attendance: 3,000; Referee: (Hungary) Roland Veizer

7 April 2012 23	Vasas SC	2–4	Kecskeméti TE	Budapest, Pest County
17:30 CET (UTC+01)	Kovács 47'; Dajić 87'	(Report)	Alempijević 5'; Lencse 7'; Pekár 43'; Tököli 73'	Stadium: Stadion Rudolf Illovszky; Attendance: 1,000; Referee: (Hungary) Zoltán Iványi

14 April 2012 24	Kecskeméti TE	2–0	Zalaegerszegi TE	Kecskemét, Bács-Kiskun County
17:00 CET (UTC+01)	Lencse 5'; Litsingi 64'	(Report)		Stadium: Széktói Stadion; Attendance: 2,500; Referee: (Hungary) Balázs Böcskei

21 April 2012 25	Ferencvárosi TC	2–1	Kecskeméti TE	Budapest, Pest County
17:30 CET (UTC+01)	Šimić 1'; Grúz 32'	(Report)	Litsingi 47'	Stadium: Stadion Albert Flórián; Attendance: 6,000; Referee: (Hungary) Péter Solymosi

29 April 2012 26	Kecskeméti TE	2–0	Győri ETO FC	Kecskemét, Bács-Kiskun County
18:00 CET (UTC+01)	Lencse 23' (pen.) 33'	(Report)		Stadium: Széktói Stadion; Attendance: 2,000; Referee: (Hungary) Ádám Németh

5 May 2012 27	Kecskeméti TE	0–2	Videoton FC	Kecskemét, Bács-Kiskun County
15:00 CET (UTC+01)		(Report)	Sándor 10' 71'	Stadium: Széktói Stadion; Attendance: 2,500; Referee: (Hungary) Zsolt Szabó

12 May 2012 28	Lombard-Pápa TFC	1–0	Kecskeméti TE	Pápa, Veszprém County
19:00 CET (UTC+01)	Lovrencsics 72'	(Report)		Stadium: Stadion Várkerti; Attendance: 500; Referee: (Hungary) Zoltán Iványi

18 May 2012 29	Kecskeméti TE	0–0	Újpest FC	Kecskemét, Bács-Kiskun County
18:00 CET (UTC+01)		(Report)		Stadium: Széktói Stadion; Attendance: 3,500; Referee: (Hungary) István Vad

26 May 2012 30	BFC Siófok	0–2	Kecskeméti TE	Siófok, Somogy County
15:00 CET (UTC+01)		(Report)	Lencse 45' (pen.); Bertus 69'	Stadium: Révész Street Stadium; Attendance: 500; Referee: (Hungary) Viktor Kassai

=== Classification ===
Pos	Team	Pld	W	D	L	GF	GA	GD	Pts	Qualification or relegation
3	Győr	30	20	3	7	56	31	+25	63	Ineligible for 2012–13 European competitions (Note: Győr have been suspended from participating in UEFA competitions for the first season they qualify between the 2011–12 and 2013–14 seasons in relation to club licensing violations. As a consequence, since they finish in any of the top three positions, the respective qualifying spots have been allocated to the team(s) immediately below.)
4	Honvéd	30	13	7	10	48	40	+8	46	Qualification for Europa League first qualifying round
5	Kecskemét	30	13	6	11	48	38	+10	45	
6	Paks	30	12	9	9	47	51	−4	45	
7	Diósgyőr	30	13	4	13	42	43	−1	43	

Source: MLSZ (in Hungarian)
Rules for classification: 1st points; 2nd overall wins; 3rd goal difference; 4th goals scored

=== Results summary ===
Overall								Home						Away					
Pld	W	D	L	GF	GA	GD	Pts	W	D	L	GF	GA	GD	W	D	L	GF	GA	GD
30	13	6	11	48	38	+10	45	8	3	4	23	12	+11	5	3	7	25	26	−1

Last updated: 27 May 2012.
Source: NB1

=== Results by round ===
Round	1	2	3	4	5	6	7	8	9	10	11	12	13	14	15	16	17	18	19	20	21	22	23	24	25	26	27	28	29	30
Ground	A	H	A	H	A	H	A	H	A	H	A	A	H	A	H	H	A	H	A	H	A	H	A	H	A	H	H	A	H	A
Result	L	W	W	L	D	W	D	D	D	W	L	W	W	L	W	L	L	W	L	L	W	D	W	W	L	W	L	L	D	W
Position	11	7	6	8	7	6	5	7	8	7	7	6	4	7	6	6	7	6	6	7	7	7	5	5	5	5	5	5	5	5

Updated to match(es) played on 27 May 2012. Source: Matches
A = Away; H = Home; W = Win; D = Draw; L = Loss

== Hungarian Cup ==
26 October 2011 4	Mezőkövesd-Zsóry SE	2–3	Kecskeméti TE	Mezőkövesd, Borsod-Abaúj-Zemplén County
14:00	Maynard 7' (o.g.); Lakatos 13'	(Report)	Foxi 20'; Stokić 29' 62'	Stadium: Mezőkövesdi Városi Stadion; Attendance: 600; Referee: (Hungary) János Takács

=== Round of 16 ===
30 November 2011 1st leg	Kecskeméti TE	1–2	Debreceni VSC	Kecskemét, Bács-Kiskun County
16:45	Bori 55'	(Report)	Coulibaly 5'; Korhut 20'	Stadium: Széktói Stadion; Attendance: 400; Referee: (Hungary) Tamás Bognár

3 December 2011 2nd leg	Debreceni VSC	1–1 (3–2 agg.)	Kecskeméti TE	Debrecen, Hajdú-Bihar County
15:00	Kulcsár 89'	(Report)	Mohl 41'	Stadium: Stadion Oláh Gábor Út; Attendance: 2,700; Referee: (Hungary) István Vad

== League Cup ==
=== Group stage ===
31 August 2011 1	Szolnoki MÁV FC	1–3	Kecskeméti TE	Szolnok, Jász-Nagykun-Szolnok County
17:30	Mile 51'	(Report)	Alempijević 40'; Čukić 71'; Lencse 78'	Stadium: Tiszaligeti Stadion; Referee: (Hungary) László Lovas

7 September 2011 2	Kecskeméti TE	4–3	Újpest FC	Kecskemét, Bács-Kiskun County
18:00	Lencse 2'; Savić 59'; Simon 74' 90+2'	(Report)	Bognár 19' (pen.); Üveges 35'; Szabó 55' (pen.)	Stadium: Széktói Stadion; Attendance: 800; Referee: (Hungary) Ferenc Karakó

5 October 2011 3	Paksi SE	1–2	Kecskeméti TE	Paks, Tolna County
15:00	Bartha 49'	(Report)	Pekár 64'; Maynard 67'	Stadium: Stadion PSE; Attendance: 150; Referee: (Hungary) Tibor Gyarmati

12 October 2011 4	Kecskeméti TE	2–1	Paksi SE	Kecskemét, Bács-Kiskun County
17:00	Bertus 11'; Mohl 66'	(Report)	Magasföldi 16'	Stadium: Széktói Stadion; Attendance: 300; Referee: (Hungary) Gábor Kovács

9 November 2011 5	Újpest FC	4–2	Kecskeméti TE	Budapest, Pest County
17:00	Rajczi 15' 49'; Remili 74'; Lázár 85' (pen.)	(Report)	Litsingi 19' 43'	Stadium: Szusza Ferenc Stadium; Attendance: 800; Referee: (Hungary) János Takács

16 November 2011 6	Kecskeméti TE	0–0	Szolnoki MÁV FC	Kecskemét, Bács-Kiskun County
16:00		(Report)		Stadium: Széktói Stadion; Attendance: 300; Referee: (Hungary) Gyöngyi Gaál

==== Classification ====
Pos	Team	Pld	W	D	L	GF	GA	GD	Pts	Qualification
1	Kecskemét	6	4	1	1	13	10	+3	13	Advance to knockout phase
2	Paks	6	3	1	2	24	11	+13	10	Advance to knockout phase
3	Újpest	6	3	1	2	17	15	+2	10	
4	Szolnok	6	0	1	5	3	18	−15	1	

Rules for classification: 1) points; 2) goal difference; 3) number of goals scored.

=== Quarter-final ===
21 February 2012 1st leg	MTK Budapest FC	2–2	Kecskeméti TE	Budapest, Pest County
13:00	Tischler 64' (pen.); Könyves 67'	(Report)	Bori 4'; Litsingi 71'	Stadium: Hidegkuti Nándor Stadium; Referee: (Hungary) Ádám Radványi

7 March 2012 2nd leg	Kecskeméti TE	1–0 (3–2 agg.)	MTK Budapest FC	Kecskemét, Bács-Kiskun County
18:00	Litsingi 74'	(Report)		Stadium: Széktói Stadion; Attendance: 500; Referee: (Hungary) Zsolt Szabó

=== Semi-final ===
28 March 2012 1st leg	Kecskeméti TE	4–0	Debreceni VSC	Kecskemét, Bács-Kiskun County
18:00	Tököli 9' 30' (pen.); Litsingi 44'; Lencse 74'	(Report)		Stadium: Széktói Stadion; Attendance: 500; Referee: (Hungary) Tamás Bognár

4 April 2012 2nd leg	Debreceni VSC	1–1 (1–5 agg.)	Kecskeméti TE	Debrecen, Hajdú-Bihar County
18:00	B. Farkas 23' (pen.)	(Report)	Tököli 54'	Stadium: Stadion Oláh Gábor Út; Attendance: 500; Referee: (Hungary) János Takács

=== Final ===
18 April 2012 Final	Kecskeméti TE	0–3	Videoton FC	Kecskemét, Bács-Kiskun County
17:30		(Report)	Sándor 38'; Gyurcsó 65'; Nikolić 90+1'	Stadium: Széktói Stadion; Attendance: 5,000; Referee: (Hungary) Tamás Bognár

== Europa League ==
The First and Second Qualifying Round draws took place at UEFA headquarters in Nyon, Switzerland on 20 June 2011.

14 July 2011 Q2 Leg 1	Kecskeméti TE (Hungary)	1–1	(Kazakhstan) FC Aktobe	Kecskemét
20:15 CEST	Radanović 23'	(Report)	Mane 59'	Stadium: Széktói Stadion; Attendance: 3,400; Referee: (Israel) Liran Liany

21 July 2011 Q2 Leg 2	FC Aktobe (Kazakhstan)	0–0 (1–1 agg.)	(Hungary) Kecskeméti TE	Aktobe
17:00 CEST		(Report)		Stadium: Aktobe Central Stadium; Attendance: 12,500; Referee: (Ukraine) Sergiy Boiko

== Super Cup ==
8 July 2011 final	Kecskeméti TE	0–1	Videoton FC	Kecskemét
19:00 CEST		(Report)	Alves 82'	Stadium: Széktói Stadion; Attendance: 5,000; Referee: (Hungary) Mihály Fábián

== Pre Season (Winter) ==
21 January 2012	Szolnoki MÁV FC	1–0	Kecskeméti TE	Szolnok, Jász-Nagykun-Szolnok County
	Rokszin 73'	(Report)		Stadium: Tiszaligeti Stadion; Attendance: 200; Referee: (Hungary) Sándor Czékus

25 January 2012	Vasas SC	3–1	Kecskeméti TE	Budapest, Pest County
	Kulcsár; Beliczky; Mehmedagić	(Report)	Vinícius	Stadium: Stadion Rudolf Illovszky; Attendance: 200; Referee: (Hungary) Kömpf

28 January 2012	Paksi SE	1–3	Kecskeméti TE	Paks, Tolna County
	Böde 14'	(Report)	Savić 57'; Pekár 79'; Litsingi 88'	Stadium: Stadion PSE

4 February 2012	Gyirmót SE	2–0	Kecskeméti TE	Novigrad, Istria County, Croatia
	Ferenczi 49'; Tóth 82'	(Report)

5 February 2012	(Croatia) NK Novigrad	2–4	Kecskeméti TE	Novigrad, Istria County, Croatia
		(Report)	Hegedűs; Ebala; Litsingi

9 February 2012	(Croatia) NK Pomorac Kostrena	0–2	Kecskeméti TE	Novigrad, Istria County, Croatia
		(Report)	Bori; Ebala

11 February 2012	(Slovenia) FC Koper	1–1	Kecskeméti TE	Novigrad, Istria County, Croatia
		(Report)	Tököli 5'

12 February 2012	(Croatia) NK Istra 1961	1–2	Kecskeméti TE	Novigrad, Istria County, Croatia
		(Report)	Gyagya; Csizmadia

15 February 2012	(Bosnia and Herzegovina) NK Zvijezda Gradačac	1–1	Kecskeméti TE	Novigrad, Istria County, Croatia
		(Report)	Lencse

25 February 2012	Kecskeméti TE	1–1	Ferencvárosi TC II	Kecskemét, Bács-Kiskun County
	Lencse	(Report)	Papp	Stadium: Széktói Stadion
