= 2011–12 Republika Srpska Cup =

Tournament details
- Country: Bosnia and Herzegovina

Final positions
- Champions: Borac Banja Luka
- Runners-up: Sloboda Mrkonjić Grad

The 2011–12 Republika Srpska Cup was a tournament organized by the Football Association of Republika Srpska.

FK Borac Banja Luka ended up beating FK Sloboda Mrkonjić Grad in the final. That was the club's 5th cup title.

== Round of 32 ==
Home team	Score	Away team
Mladost Gacko	1:1; Pen. 4 - 1	Leotar
Sloboda Novi Grad	2:0	Proleter Teslić
FK Župa Milosavci	0:1	Borac Banja Luka
FK Jedinstvo Žeravica	2:2; Pen. 4 - 3	Rudar Prijedor
FK Kozara Donji Orlovci	0:0; Pen. 1 - 4	Sloboda Mrkonjić Grad
FK Mladost Bogutovo Selo	2:1	Sutjeska Foča
FK Krupa	0:0; Pen. 4 - 5	Kozara Gradiška
Famos Istočna Ilidža	1:0	FK Drina HE
Borac Šamac	0:5	Sloga Doboj
FK Velež Nevesinje	0:3	Drina Zvornik
FK Naprijed	1:2	Modriča
Radnik	0:1	Slavija
FK Zadrugar Tarevci	2:5	Laktaši
OFK Glasinac 2011	3:0	Mladost Velika Obarska
BSK Banja Luka	4:0	OFK Ravan Medjedja
FK Polet Kravica	1:3	Podrinje

== Round of 16 ==
Home team	Score	Away team
Sloboda Mrkonjić Grad	2:0	Mladost Gacko
FK Jedinstvo Žeravica	1:1; Pen. 3 - 4	Podrinje
BSK Banja Luka	2:0	Laktaši
Sloboda Novi Grad	3:0	Slavija
Famos Istočna Ilidža	0:4	Borac Banja Luka
Drina Zvornik	1:1; Pen. 5 - 4	Kozara Gradiška
OFK Glasinac 2011	2:4	Sloga Doboj
FK Mladost Bogutovo Selo	1:0	Modriča
