= Zlatko Juričević =

Personal information
- Full name: Zlatko Juričević
- Date of birth: 28 July 1958
- Place of birth: Zenica, PR Bosnia and Herzegovina, FPR Yugoslavia
- Date of death: 24 November 2018 (aged 60)
- Position: Goalkeeper

Senior career*
Years	Team	Apps	(Gls)
1977–1978	Rudar Prijedor	11	(0)
1979–1981	Čelik Zenica	54	(0)
1984–1986	Čelik Zenica	21	(0)
1987–1992	Karşıyaka	148	(0)
- * Club domestic league appearances and goals

Zlatko Juričević (28 July 1958 – 24 November 2018) was a professional football goalkeeper who played in the former Yugoslavia and Turkey.

== Club career ==
Juričević started playing football for FK Rudar Prijedor in the Yugoslav Second League and later in the Yugoslav First League for NK Čelik Zenica. In the second half of the 1980s, he moved to Turkey where he played for Karşıyaka.

== Personal life ==
He spent the last years of his life in Croatia, on the island of Brač.
