= Nedžad Žerić =

Bosnian footballer (born 1972)

Personal information
- Date of birth: 6 August 1972 (age 54)
- Place of birth: Prijedor, SFR Yugoslavia
- Position: Midfielder

Senior career*
Years	Team	Apps	(Gls)
1995–1996	Travnik	29	(6)
1996–1998	Jedinstvo Bihać	59	(3)
1998–1999	Tzafririm Holon	30	(1)
2001–2003	Jedinstvo Bihać	61	(12)
2004–2006	Travnik	55	(10)
2006–2007	Jedinstvo Bihać	23	(2)
2009–2012	Rudar Prijedor	85	(9)
Total		342	(43)

International career
1997	Bosnia and Herzegovina	2	(0)

Managerial career
- 2016: Podgrmeč
- 2017: Jedinstvo Bihać
- 2018–2019: Rudar Prijedor
- 2019–2022: Kozara Gradiška
- 2023–2024: Jedinstvo Bihać
- 2025: Jedinstvo Bihać
- * Club domestic league appearances and goals

Nedžad Žerić (born 6 August 1972) is a Bosnian professional football manager and former player. Besides Bosnia and Herzegovina, he also played in Israel.

== Club career ==
Žerić was captain of hometown club Rudar Prijedor for four seasons and had a three-year spell in Israel, playing for Tzafririm Holon.

== International career ==
Žerić made his debut for Bosnia and Herzegovina in a September 1997 World Cup qualification match away against Croatia and has earned a total of 2 caps, scoring no goals. His second and final international was a November 1997 friendly match away against Tunisia.

== Managerial career ==
Žerić had worked as an assistant to manager Velimir Stojnić at Rudar Prijedor and temporarily took over when Stojnić was sacked in March 2013. In September 2015, he earned his UEFA coaching license.

Žerić was expected to take over managerial duties from Igor Janković at Kozara Gradiška in 2019, after having managed Jedinstvo Bihać, Rudar Prijedor and Podgrmeč. He became manager of Jedinstvo in January 2017, but left the club after saving them from relegation in June 2017.
