= 2013–14 Republika Srpska Cup =

2013–14 Republika Srpska Football Cup
Tournament details
- Country: Bosnia and Herzegovina
- Teams: 30

Final positions
- Champions: Radnik Bijeljina
- Runners-up: Rudar Prijedor

The Republika Srpska Cup 2013–14 was the tenth season of the Republika Srpska national football tournament.

The competition started on 18 September 2013, and got concluded in June 2014. The defending champions FK Radnik Bijeljina were once again crowned champions as they FK Rudar Prijedor in the final, 5-3 on penalty kicks. Radnik were considered favourites to win the title as Prijedor were missing some players.

== Calendar ==
Round	Date(s)	Number of fixtures	Clubs	New entries this round
Round of 32	18 September 2013	16	32 → 16	none
Round of 16	16 October 2013	8	16 → 8	none
Quarterfinals	13 November 2013	4	8 → 4	none
Semifinals	April and May 2014	2	4 → 2	none
Final	June 2014	1	2 → 1	none

== Competition ==
=== Round of 32 ===
This round consisted of 16 single-legged fixtures. All 32 clubs entered the competition from this round, while the matches were played on 2 October 2013. In case of a draw in the regular time, the winner would have been determined with a penalty shootout.

=== West ===
Tie no	Home team	Score	Away team
1	Rudar Prijedor (I)	1–1 (5–3 pen.)	Borac (BL) (I)
2	Borac (KD) (IV)	1–4	Sloboda (MG) (II)
3	Ljubić (III)	0–2	Tekstilac (III)
4	Karanovac (IV)	1–3	Borac (Š) (II)
5	Sloga Srbac (III)	0–2	Sloga Doboj (II)
6	Omarska (III)	0–1	Sloboda (NG) (II)
7	Krupa (III)	1–2	Kozara (II)
8	Jedinstvo (Ž) (III)	3–1	Modriča (II)

=== East ===
Tie no	Home team	Score	Away team
9	Crvena zvijezda (O) (II)	2–1	Leotar (I)
10	Vlasenica (III)	0–0 (5–3 pen.)	Slavija (I)
11	Drina HE (II)	1–0	Podrinje (II)
12	Mladost (BS) (III)	3–5	Rudar (U) (II)
13	Glasinac 2011 (III)	0–1	Sutjeska (II)
14	Velež (N) (IV)	2–0	Mladost (G) (II)

=== Final ===
Date	Home team	Score	Away team
6 August 2014	Radnik (B)	0–0 (5–3 p)	Rudar Prijedor
