= FK Borac Kozarska Dubica =

Borac Kozarska Dubica
- Full name: Fudbalski klub Borac Kozarska Dubica
- Founded: 1936
- Ground: Đolovi Stadium, Kozarska Dubica
- Capacity: 2,000
- Chairman: Milan Šuvak
- Manager: Slobodan Starčević
- League: First League of RS
- 2023–24: First League of RS, 15th
Home colours	Away colours

Fudbalski klub Borac Kozarska Dubica (Serbian Cyrillic: Фудбалски клуб Борац Козарска Дубица) is a Bosnian football club from the city of Kozarska Dubica, Republika Srpska. They have played in the First League of the Republika Srpska in season 1996–97, but were relegated to the Second League of the Republika Srpska in 1997 as a result of merger of East and West division of First League. In 2004, they were relegated to the Regional League. After many years of playing in regional and local leagues, in 2014 they were promoted back to the Second League, the 3rd level league competition in Bosnia and Herzegovina. In 2020, they were promoted back to the First League.

== History ==
=== Origins ===
Football club Borac was established in July 1936 at the initiative of leather workers of Dubica, Vrbas Banovina, Kingdom of Yugoslavia. Originally it was named Radnički sportski klub Borac, which in English language means Workers Sports Club 'Fighter' , and its roots come from the relation the club had with labour movements during the first half of the 20th century.

The founders were Ahmet Ćelam, Vujo Momčilović and Razim Hadžić, workers from Dubica. Players were mainly the workers, as well as poor youths without jobs. At that time, management and players were members of different faiths and nations who lived in the town. Although he was in a weak financial position and performed in the lower ranks of the competition, the Borac was too popular among fellow citizens.

Borac rallied progressive young people and members of the Communist Party. City authorities did not provide any help to the club because he was considered a "red club". On the contrary, they tried in every way to obstruct the Club activities because was considered an enemy of the social system. However, the Borac has managed to maintain a decent sports team.

Besides playing football and participating in the football league, the Borac administration organized mass trips and celebrations of May Day.

== Club records ==
Season	League									CupRS	Cup	Top goalscorer	
Season	Division	P	W	D	L	F	A	Pts	Pos	CupRS	Cup	Player	Goals
2002–03	2nd RS, W	30	13	3	14	56	52	42	7th	QR	—N/a		
2003–04	2nd RS, W	26	12	2	12	47	41	38	5th	R1	—N/a		
2004–05	2nd RS, W									QR	—N/a		
2005–06	2nd RS, W	30	12	3	15	41	64	39	13th	QR	—N/a		
2006–07	2nd RS, W	30								QR	—N/a		
2007–08	3rd-PR RS	22						50	2nd	QR	—N/a		
2008–09	RL-W RS									QR	—N/a		
2009–10										QR	—N/a		
2010–11	4th-PR RS								1st	R1	—N/a		
2011–12	RL-W RS	26	11	5	10	38	45	38	8th	QR	—N/a		
2012–13	RL-W RS	26	10	4	12	40	48	34	10th	QR	—N/a		
2013–14	RL-W RS	30	18	6	6			60	1st	R1	—N/a		
2014–15	2nd RS, W	26	10	7	9	36	33	37	8th	QR	—N/a	Vladan Reljić	10
2015–16	2nd RS, W	30	8	6	16	41	61	30	14th		—N/a		
2016–17	2nd RS, W	30	5	11	14	29	66	26	15th	R2	—N/a		
2018–19	RL-W RS	28	25	3	0	108	23	78	1st	R1	—N/a		
2019–20	2nd RS, W	15	11	2	2	53	20	35	1st	R2	—N/a		
2020–21	1st RS	30	11	6	13	35	38	39	10th		—N/a		

Key
League: P = Matches played; W = Matches won; D = Matches drawn; L = Matches lost; F = Goals for; A = Goals against; Pts = Points won; Pos = Final position;
Cup: PR = Preliminary round; QR = Qualifying round; R1 = Round of 32; R2 = Round of 16; QF = Quarter-final; SF = Semi-final; RU = Runner-up; W = Competition won;

== Best results ==
- First League of the Republika Srpska
  - 10th place: 1996–97
- Second League of the Republika Srpska, West Division
  - Runners-up (1): 1995–96
  - 1st Place (1): 2022–23
- Republika Srpska Cup
  - Eighth-finals (2): 2001–02, 2016–17
  - 16th-finals (3): 2003–04, 2010–11, 2013–14
- RFA Prijedor Cup
  - Winners (1): 2007

== Players ==
=== Current squad ===
As of 25 February 2022

Note: Flags indicate national team as defined under FIFA eligibility rules; some limited exceptions apply. Players may hold more than one non-FIFA nationality.

No.	Pos.	Nation	Player
—	GK	COL	William Arias
—	GK	CRO	Dušan Plavšić
—	GK	BIH	Zoran Mijić
—	DF	IDN	Nur Yufa
—	DF	IDN	Naufal Khairullah
—	DF	BIH	Bojan Vucen
—	DF	SRB	Marko Ćulibrk
—	DF	BIH	Ognjen Petraković
—	DF	BIH	Nikola Babić
—	DF	BIH	Neven Bunić
—	MF	BIH	Nikola Pekić
—	MF	BIH	Goran Burazor

No.	Pos.	Nation	Player
—	MF	BIH	Marko Gligić
—	MF	BIH	Mile Kovačević
—	MF	BIH	Nikola Krneta
—	MF	BIH	Borislav Topić
—	MF	BIH	Ilija Kovačević
—	FW	BIH	Stefan Radaković
—	FW	BIH	Ognjen Krneta
—	FW	BIH	Alem Suljić
—	FW	COL	Faver Ramírez
—	FW	BIH	Filip Mikić
—	FW	IDN	Ronald Setmot
—	FW	SRB	Stefan Tomaš

=== Notable players ===
List of players who represented FIFA international teams in International matches.

- (Socialist Federal Republic of Yugoslavia) Vlado Kotur
- (Slovenia) Aleksandar Rodić
- (Bosnia and Herzegovina) Nemanja Trkulja

== Historical list of managers ==
- (Bosnia and Herzegovina) Goran Adžić (2013–2014)
- (Bosnia and Herzegovina) Željko Knežević (2014–)
- (Bosnia and Herzegovina) Zoran Bujić (2018–2021)
- (Bosnia and Herzegovina) Rade Drvenica (2021–2023)
- (Bosnia and Herzegovina) Slobodan Starčević (2023–present)
