= Álvaro Roncal =

Spanish footballer

Personal information
- Full name: Álvaro Roncal Rivera
- Date of birth: 25 December 2000 (age 25)
- Place of birth: Burlada, Spain
- Position: Right back

Team information
- Current team: Rudar Prijedor
- Number: 47

Youth career
- 2004–2019: Txantrea

Senior career*
Years	Team	Apps	(Gls)
2019	Txantrea	1	(0)
2019–2021	Eibar Urko	11	(2)
2021–2023	Vitoria	51	(2)
2021–2022	Eibar	1	(0)
2024	Ordino	9	(1)
2024–2025	Atlètic Club d'Escaldes	25	(1)
2025–	Rudar Prijedor	29	(3)
- * Club domestic league appearances and goals as of 12 June 2026

Álvaro Roncal Rivera (born 25 December 2000) is a Spanish professional footballer who plays as a right back for Rudar Prijedor in the Bosnian Premier League.

== Club career ==
An UDC Txantrea youth graduate, Roncal first appeared with the main squad on 4 May 2019, starting in a 1–1 Tercera División home draw against Beti Kozkor KE. In July of that year, he moved to SD Eibar and was assigned to the second reserve team SD Eibar Urko in the regional leagues.

Ahead of the 2021–22 campaign, Roncal was assigned to farm team CD Vitoria in the Tercera División RFEF. He made his first-team debut for the Armeros on 15 December 2021, starting in a 2–1 away win over CD Tenerife in the season's Copa del Rey.

== Personal life ==
Roncal's brother Adrián is also a footballer. A forward, he represented UCD Burladés and CD Valle de Egüés as a senior.
