= Dehninio Muringen =

Surinamese footballer

Personal information
- Date of birth: 1 February 1999 (age 27)
- Place of birth: Amsterdam, Netherlands
- Height: 1.84 m (6 ft 0 in)
- Position: Defender

Team information
- Current team: Milsami Orhei
- Number: 24

Youth career
- Utrecht
- 2018–2019: ADO Den Haag

Senior career*
Years	Team	Apps	(Gls)
2019–2021	ADO Den Haag	1	(0)
2020–2021	→ Dordrecht (loan)	22	(2)
2022	Roda	6	(0)
2022–2024	Paide Linnameeskond	20	(1)
2025–	Milsami Orhei	28	(0)
- * Club domestic league appearances and goals as of 1 June 2026

Dehninio Muringen (born 1 February 1999) is a Dutch professional footballer who plays as a defender for Moldovan Liga club Milsami Orhei.

== Professional career ==
Muringen made his professional debut with ADO Den Haag in a 3-3 Eredivisie tie with Willem II on 23 November 2019.

On 6 January 2022, Muringen signed with Roda.

On 27 September 2022 he joined Estonian Meistriliiga club Paide Linnameeskond with 2-year deal.

== Personal life ==
Born in the Netherlands, Muringen is of Surinamese descent. Muringen is the brother of the late footballer Kelvin Maynard.
