= Aleksandar Rodić =

Slovenian footballer (born 1979)

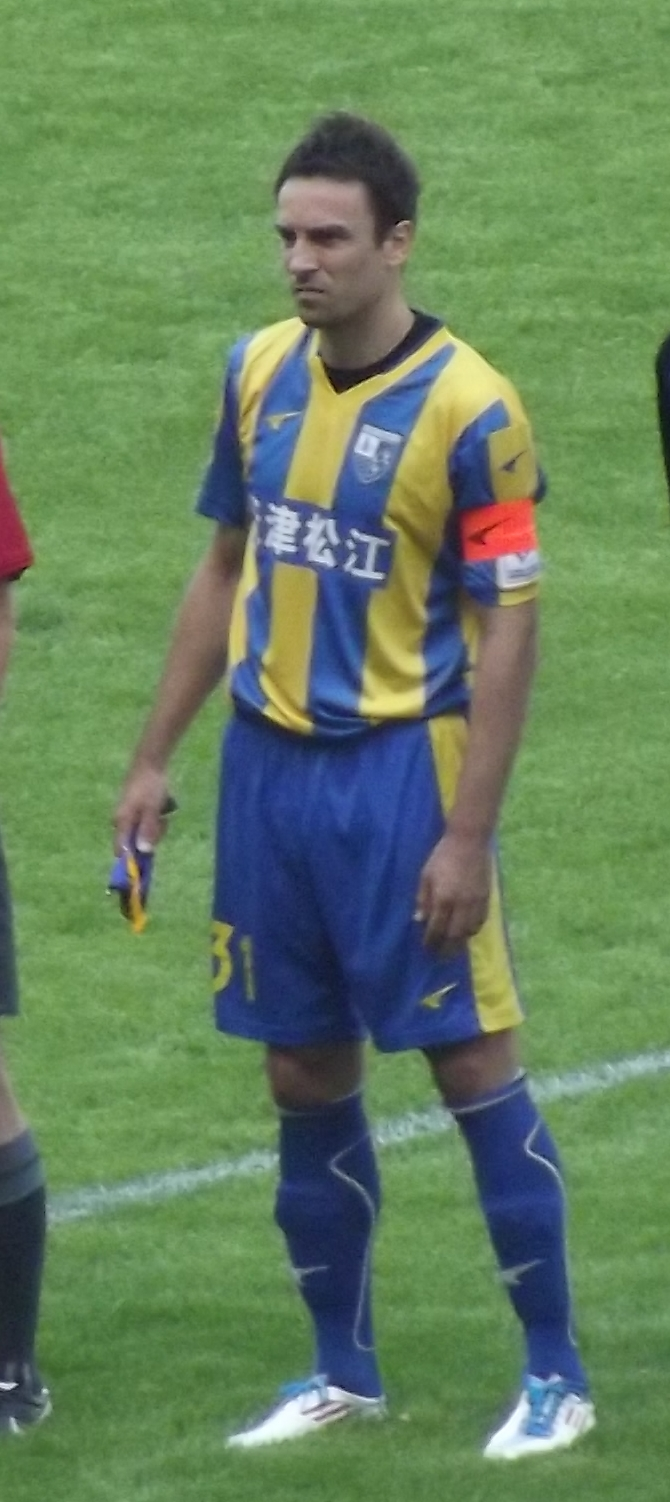

Personal information
- Date of birth: 26 December 1979 (age 46)
- Place of birth: Bosanska Dubica, SFR Yugoslavia
- Height: 1.86 m (6 ft 1 in)
- Position: Forward

Youth career
- 1989–1998: Borac Kozarska Dubica

Senior career*
| Years | Team | Apps | (Gls) |
| 1998–1999 | Borac Kozarska Dubica | | |
| 1999–2000 | Proleter Zrenjanin | 3 | (0) |
| 2000 | Red Star Belgrade | 0 | (0) |
| 2001 | Westerlo | 6 | (0) |
| 2001–2002 | Verbroedering Geel | 30 | (3) |
| 2002–2004 | Gorica | 60 | (18) |
| 2005 | Portsmouth | 4 | (0) |
| 2005–2006 | Kayserispor | 16 | (7) |
| 2006–2007 | Litex Lovech | 16 | (1) |
| 2007–2010 | Interblock | 34 | (6) |
| 2009 | → Shanghai Shenhua (loan) | 28 | (5) |
| 2010 | → Qingdao Jonoon (loan) | 25 | (7) |
| 2011–2012 | Tianjin Songjiang | 44 | (13) |
| 2013 | Chengdu Blades | 23 | (2) |
| 2014–2015 | Olimpija Ljubljana | 33 | (7) |
| 2015 | UF Monfalcone | 8 | (3) |
| 2016–2017 | Itala San Marco | | |

International career
| 2005 | Slovenia | 9 | (1) |

Managerial career
- 2025: Izola
- 2026: Izola
- * Club domestic league appearances and goals

Aleksandar Rodić (Serbian Cyrillic: Александар Родић, pronounced [aleksǎːndar rǒːditɕ, alěksaːn-]; born 26 December 1979) is a retired Slovenian footballer who played as a forward.

== Club career ==
At the beginning of his career, Rodić played in FR Yugoslavia. He made three appearances for Proleter Zrenjanin during the 1999–2000 First League of FR Yugoslavia season.

On transfer deadline day in January 2005, Rodić signed for English club Portsmouth, making his debut as an 81st-minute substitute for Patrik Berger in a 2–1 victory over Middlesbrough. However, he failed to hold down a regular place in the team and the following season (2005–06) he was loaned to Turkish club Kayserispor. Rodić was released in the summer of 2006 and was signed by Bulgarian club Litex Lovech to partner Milivoje Novaković, another Slovenian international and Litex attacker. He made 16 appearances in the league, managing 1 goal. After leaving the team, Rodić accused club owner Grisha Ganchev, manager Ljupko Petrović and the administrative personnel at the team of a lack of professionalism. In 2007, he moved to Interblock for 200,000 euros. On 13 March 2009, Rodić was loaned out to Shanghai Shenhua of the Chinese Super League. In February 2010, he was loaned to another Chinese Super League club, Qingdao Jonoon.

== International career ==
While Rodić was playing for Slovenian club Gorica, he underwent extraordinary naturalization on the recommendation of the Football Association of Slovenia. He made his debut for the Slovenia national team against the Czech Republic on 9 February 2005 and went on to make a total of nine appearances for the team, all in 2005.

== Personal life ==
Rodić was born in Bosanska Dubica, SFR Yugoslavia to a Bosnian Serb family. In 2006, he married Slovenian triple jumper Snežana Vukmirović.

== Career statistics ==
=== International ===
Appearances and goals by national team and year
| National team | Year | Apps | Goals |
|---|---|---|---|
| Slovenia | 2005 | 9 | 1 |
| Total | | 9 | 1 |

Scores and results list Slovenia's goal tally first, score column indicates score after each Rodić goal.

List of international goals scored by Aleksandar Rodić
| No. | Date | Venue | Opponent | Score | Result | Competition |
|---|---|---|---|---|---|---|
| 1 | 30 March 2005 | Arena Petrol, Celje, Slovenia | Belarus | 1–0 | 1–1 | 2006 FIFA World Cup qualification |
