= Fabrizio Danese =

Italian football player

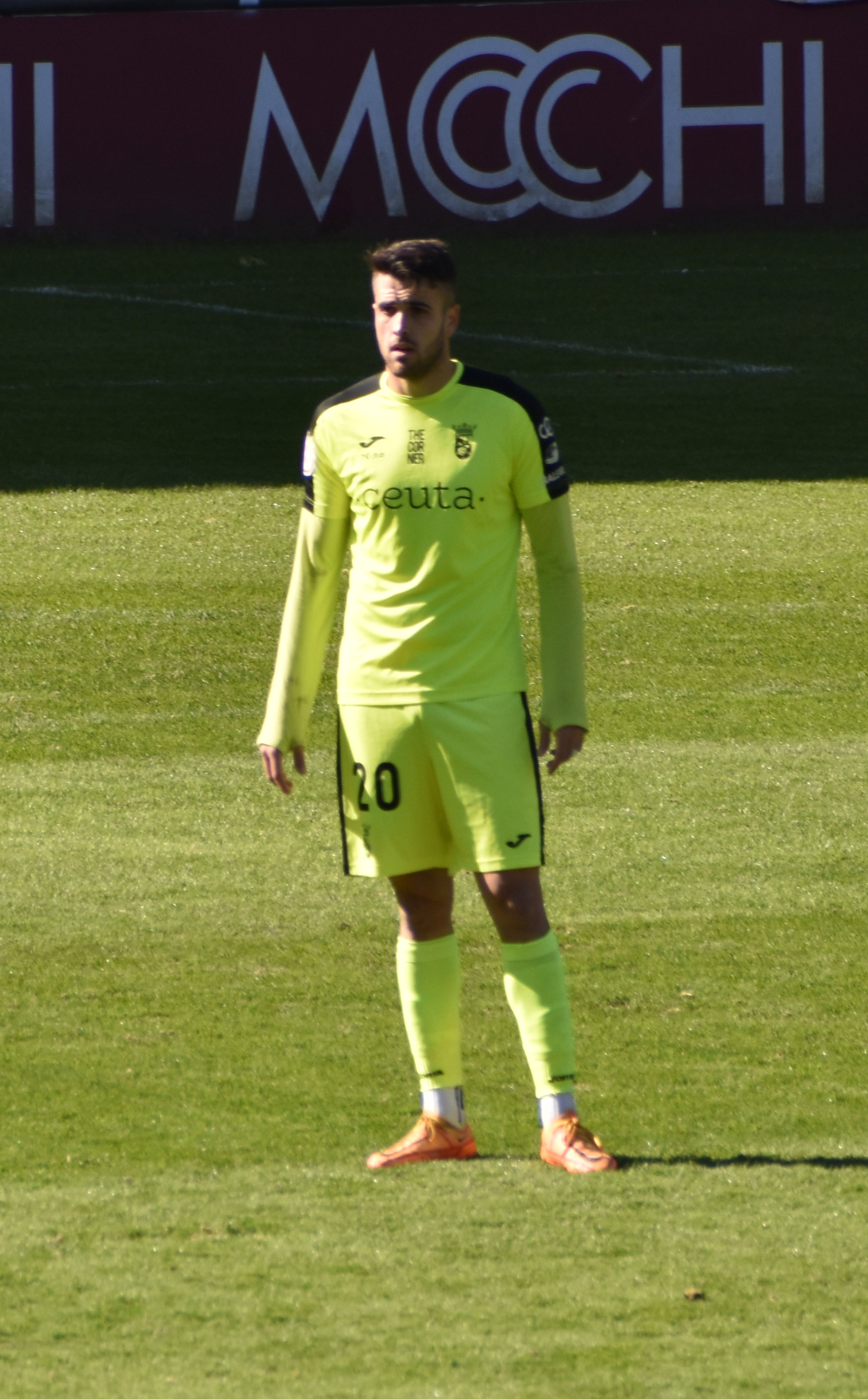

Personal information
- Date of birth: 26 June 1995 (age 31)
- Place of birth: Rome, Italy
- Height: 1.87 m (6 ft 1 1/2 in)
- Position: Defender

Team information
- Current team: Rudar Prijedor
- Number: 6

Senior career*
Years	Team	Apps	(Gls)
2014–2016	Nuorese	35	(1)
2014–2015	→ Ostia Mare (loan)	2	(0)
2016–2018	Chievo	0	(0)
2016–2017	→ Prato (loan)	13	(1)
2017–2018	→ Akragas (loan)	29	(0)
2018–2019	Arezzo	0	(0)
2019	Arzachena	11	(0)
2019–2021	Linense	41	(2)
2021–2022	Eldense	26	(1)
2022–2023	Cornellà	4	(0)
2023–2024	Ceuta	50	(1)
2024–2025	UE Santa Coloma	4	(1)
2025	Numancia	21	(1)
2026–	Rudar Prijedor	15	(2)
- * Club domestic league appearances and goals as of 12 June 2026

Fabrizio Danese (born 26 June 1995) is an Italian football player who plays as a defender for Bosnian Premier League club Rudar Prijedor.

== Club career ==
He started playing football at the age of 5 at the Lodigiani football school. He later wore the shirts of Cisco Lodigiani, Cisco Roma, Pro Roma. At the age of 16 he played his first game in Excellence with Tor Sapienza. age of 17 makes his Serie D debut with Civitavecchia Calcio. In the same year he moved to Brescia Calcio in the spring. He made his Serie C debut for Prato on 14 September 2016 in a game against Carrarese.

On 31 January 2019 he signed with Arzachena.

On 24 July 2019, he signed with the Spanish club Linense. He scored his first goal with Linense on 23 November 2019 against Sevilla Atletico.

In January 2025, Danese joined Numancia following a spell in Andorra with Primera Divisió club UE Santa Coloma.
