= OFK Ravan =

- Full name: Omladinski fudbalski klub Ravan
- Founded: 1971
- Chairman: Mile Mandić
- League: Regional league of the Republika Srpska, West Division
- 2013–14: 7th
Home colours

Omladinski fudbalski klub Ravan (Serbian Cyrillic: Омладински фудбалски клуб Раван, English: Ravan Youth Football Club), commonly known as OFK Ravan, is a Bosnian football club from Kozarska Dubica, Republika Srpska, more precisely from a village Međeđa. They have played in the Second League of the Republika Srpska since 2003, but were relegated to the Regional League in 2012.

== History ==
The club was founded in 1971 under the name "Mladost". After the founding of the club competes in the Dubica Municipal League. In 1978 they were promoted to Gradiška District League where they competed until 1992, when the War in Bosnia stopped activities.

OFK Ravan renewed its work in 1998, when they joined the Prijedor Regional League. In 2003 they were promoted to Second League of the Republika Srpska, West Division.

== Club records ==
Season	League									CupRS	Cup	Top goalscorer	
Season	Division	P	W	D	L	F	A	Pts	Pos	CupRS	Cup	Player	Goals
2002–03	3rd-PR RS									R1	—		
2003–04	2nd RS, W	26	11	2	13	33	48	35	11th	R1	—		
2004–05	2nd RS, W								6th	QR	—		
2005–06	2nd RS, W	30	13	4	13	53	51	43	7th	QR	—		
2006–07	2nd RS, W	30								QR	—		
2007–08	2nd RS, W	30	13	6	11	44	44	45	9th	QR	—		
2008–09	2nd RS, W	30	12	5	13	48	56	41	7th	QR	—		
2009–10	2nd RS, W	30	9	8	13	43	55	35	12th	QR	—		
2010–11	2nd RS, W	26	12	0	14	42	52	36	9th	QR	—		
2011–12	2nd RS, W	26	3	3	20	24	100	12	13th	QR	—		
2012–13	RL-W RS	26	4	4	18	20	63	16	12th	QR	—		
2013–14	RL-W RS	30						45	7th	QR	—		
2014–15	RL-W RS	30	10	2	18	42	64	32	13th	QR	—		

Key
League: P = Matches played; W = Matches won; D = Matches drawn; L = Matches lost; F = Goals for; A = Goals against; Pts = Points won; Pos = Final position;
Cup: PR = Preliminary round; QR = Qualifying round; R1 = Round of 32; R2 = Round of 16; QF = Quarter-final; SF = Semi-final; RU = Runner-up; W = Competition won;

== Best results ==
- Second League of the Republika Srpska, West Division
  - 6th place: 2004–05
- Republika Srpska Cup
  - 16th-finals (2): 2002–03, 2004–05
- RFA Prijedor Cup
  - Winners (2): 2002–03, 2004–05
