= Ognjen Petrović (footballer, born 1993) =

Bosnian-Herzegovinian footballer (born 1993)

Personal information
- Full name: Ognjen Petrović
- Date of birth: 18 October 1993 (age 33)
- Place of birth: Gradiška, Bosnia and Herzegovina
- Height: 1.93 m (6 ft 4 in)
- Position: Defender

Team information
- Current team: Kozara Gradiška
- Number: 3

Youth career
- Kozara Gradiška

Senior career*
Years	Team	Apps	(Gls)
2011–2012	Kozara Gradiška	13	(0)
2013	Javor Ivanjica	5	(0)
2013	→ Borac Banja Luka (loan)	4	(0)
2014–2018	Kozara Gradiška	64	(4)
2018–2019	Jedinstvo Žeravica		
2019–2020	Rudar Prijedor		
2020-	Kozara Gradiška		

International career^{‡}
2012	Bosnia and Herzegovina U-19	2	(0)
2012–	Bosnia and Herzegovina U-21	4	(0)
2014–	Republika Srpska U-23	2	(0)
- * Club domestic league appearances and goals as of 4 August 2013 ‡ National team caps and goals as of 15 August 2013

Ognjen Petrović (Serbian Cyrillic: Огњен Петровић; born 18 October 1993) is a Bosnian-Herzegovinian footballer who plays for FK Jedinstvo Žeravica in the Second League of the Republika Srpska.

== Club career ==
Born in Gradiška, Bosnia and Herzegovina, he played with local club FK Kozara Gradiška in the 2011–12 Premier League of Bosnia and Herzegovina. At the end of the season Kozara was relegated and Petrović played in the 2012–13 First League of the Republika Srpska. During the winter break, he moved to Serbia by signing with top league side FK Javor Ivanjica. He made his debut in the 2012–13 Serbian SuperLiga on March 2, 2013, in a victory of Javor over FK Smederevo by 4–0. In summer 2013 he agreed a loan deal with FK Borac Banja Luka this way returning to the Bosnian top league. He later had a spell with Rudar Prijedor.

== International career ==
Ognjen Petrović was a member of the Bosnian U-19 team. Since 2012 he has been a member of the Bosnian U-21 team.
