= Nemanja Trkulja =

Bosnian-Herzegovina footballer

Personal information
- Full name: Nemanja Trkulja
- Date of birth: 1 January 1996 (age 30)
- Place of birth: Prijedor, Bosnia and Herzegovina
- Height: 1.91 m (6 ft 3 in)
- Position: Goalkeeper

Youth career
- Borac Kozarska Dubica

Senior career*
Years	Team	Apps	(Gls)
- Borac Kozarska Dubica
2014–2016	Kozara Gradiška	18	(0)
2016–2019	Borac Banja Luka	12	(0)

International career^{‡}
2015–2018	Bosnia and Herzegovina U21	9	(0)
- * Club domestic league appearances and goals as of 2 December 2017 ‡ National team caps and goals as of 6 December 2018

Nemanja Trkulja (Serbian Cyrillic: Немања Тркуља, born 1 January 1996) is a Bosnian-Herzegovinian professional footballer who most recently played as a goalkeeper for Premier League of Bosnia and Herzegovina club Borac Banja Luka.

== Club career ==
He decided to look for other opportunities in January 2020, when his contract with Borac expired.
