= Đuro-Giulio Đekić =

Serbian footballer

Personal information
- Date of birth: 30 June 2005 (age 21)
- Place of birth: Zagreb, Croatia
- Height: 1.80 m (5 ft 11 in)
- Position: Defender

Team information
- Current team: Rudar Prijedor
- Number: 2

Youth career
- 2013–2019: Dinamo Zagreb
- 2019-2023: Lokomotiva
- 2023–2024: Gorica

Senior career*
Years	Team	Apps	(Gls)
2024–2025	Gorica	2	(0)
2025	OFK Vršac	8	(1)
2025–	Rudar Prijedor	8	(0)

International career^{‡}
- Serbia U19
- * Club domestic league appearances and goals as of 12 June 2026 ‡ National team caps and goals as of 00:42, 20 October 2015 (UTC)

Đuro-Giulio Đekić (born 30 June 2005) is a Serbian footballer who currently playing for Rudar Prijedor in Bosnia & Herzegovina.

The Serbian U-19 national team was defeated by Denmark 1:3 in the match of the first round of group IV of the final phase of the qualification cycle for the European Championship when Đuro-Giulio Đekić scored the only goal for Serbia.
