= OFK Prijedor =

- Full name: Omladinski Fudbalski Klub Prijedor
- Founded: 1919
Home colours	Away colours

OFK Prijedor (Serbian Cyrillic: OФK Пpиjeдop) is a football club based in city of Prijedor, Republika Srpska, Bosnia-Herzegovina.

== History ==
The club was founded in 1919 and is among the oldest sport collectives in Prijedor, and in Bosnia. Their stadium was the "Gradski Stadion", today their bigger city rival FK Rudar Prijedor plays there.

In 1954 FK Celuloza was formed, followed by the merger in 1958 with another Prijedor club, FK Mladost, thus forming FK Radnički Prijedor. In 1965 FK Željezničar Prijedor merged with Radnički forming a new club named OFK Prijedor.

In 1969 OFK Prijedor played the play-offs for access to the Yugoslav Second League and their opponent was NK Jedinstvo from Zagreb. In the first match played in Zagreb OFK Prijedor lost 4–3 despite initially leading by 3–0. In the second leg match in Prijedor, OFK managed an insufficient 1–1 draw. Afterwards during the 1970s the club plays mostly in the Bosnian Republic League. In the early 1980s the club competes in regional leagues of Banja Luka (also named Krajina) area, all the way until 1987 when the club returns to the Bosnian Republic League after finishing top of the Bosnian Regional League – West. They managed this by winning in the play-offs NK Hajduk Orašje by 3–0 in a match played in Prijedor stadium in front of a crowd of 6,000. In the second match they lost 3–1 however their win in the first match was enough for getting the promotion. In the next seasons the club did well in the Republic League, and in 1988 they managed to get promotion to the so-called Inter-Republic League – West, one of four leagues forming the Yugoslav Third League. In that same season FK Rudar Prijedor was relegated from the Second League, thus playing both city rivals in the same league, awarding the league with the so-called Prijedor derby.

During the 1980s the club was coached by Ivica Milošević, Ale Hrnić, Radoslav Zubanović and Idriz Hošić, and among the players worth mention were Almir Kaltak, Mirsad Karagić, Almir Karagić, Nihad Čaušević, Abdulah Dule Muhić, Mesud Crljenković, Rizvanović, Satko Džamastagić, Suad Bešić, Merim Šećerbegović and Sanimir Ramić.

In this period the derby's with city rivals FK Rudar Prijedor were extremely intense. Both clubs were the first choice for local young players, although Rudar usually also imported other players from throughout the country. The two teams merged in 1996.
