= 2014–15 Republika Srpska Cup =

2014–15 Republika Srpska Football Cup
Tournament details
- Country: Bosnia and Herzegovina
- Teams: 32

Final positions
- Champions: Rudar Prijedor
- Runners-up: Krupa

The 2014–15 Republika Srpska Cup (Serbo-Croatian Latin: Kup Republike Srpske, Serbo-Croatian Cyrillic: Куп Републикe Српскe) is the eleventh occurrence of the Republika Srpska Cup, the secondary knock-out competition for clubs from Republika Srpska.

Organised by the Football Association of Republika Srpska, the tournament started around September 2014 and got concluded in June 2015. The defending champions were FK Radnik Bijeljina, while FK Rudar Prijedor were the new champions after beating FK Krupa in the final.

== Calendar ==
Round	Date(s)	Number of fixtures	Clubs
Round of 32	September 2014	16	32 → 16
Round of 16	7–16 October 2014	8	16 → 8
Quarter-finals	15 November 2014	4	8 → 4
Semi-finals	April and May 2015	2	4 → 2
Final	June 2015	1	2 → 1

== Round of 32 ==
The Round of 32 was played in September 2014. A total of 32 teams competed in one-legged ties, with the winners progressing to the next round. In the result of a draw in regulation time, two 15 minute periods of extra time are to be played, followed by a penalty shoot-out if the scores are still level.
