= Robson de Sousa =

Brazilian footballer

Personal information
- Full name: Robson de Sousa Vasconcelos Goes
- Date of birth: January 20, 1986 (age 40)
- Place of birth: Brasília, Brazil
- Height: 1.81 m (5 ft 11 1/2 in)
- Position: Full back

Team information
- Current team: Cegléd
- Number: 20

Senior career*
Years	Team	Apps	(Gls)
2004–2008	Nova Iguaçu		
2008–2011	Kecskemét	6	(0)
2010–2011	→ Mezőkövesd (loan)	23	(1)
2011–	Cegléd	70	(0)
- * Club domestic league appearances and goals as of 1 June 2014

Robson de Sousa Vasconcelos Goes (born January 20, 1986) is a Brazilian football player who currently plays for Ceglédi VSE.
