= Pál Urbán =

Hungarian footballer

Personal information
- Full name: Pál Urbán
- Date of birth: 14 January 1989 (age 37)
- Place of birth: Kecskemét, Hungary
- Height: 1.85 m (6 ft 1 in)
- Position: Defender

Team information
- Current team: Kiskunfélegyház
- Number: 14

Youth career
- 2003–2010: Kecskemét

Senior career*
Years	Team	Apps	(Gls)
2010–2012	Kecskemét	3	(0)
2012	Dunaújváros PASE	13	(0)
2012–2015	Soroksár	66	(2)
2015	Cegléd	4	(0)
2015–2020	Kecskemét	114	(0)
2020–	Kiskunfélegyház	88	(3)
- * Club domestic league appearances and goals as of 21:03, 5 November 2023 (UTC)

Pál Urbán (born 14 January 1989 in Kecskemét) is a Hungarian football player who currently plays for Kiskunfélegyházi HTK.
