= Kelvin Maynard =

Surinamese footballer (1987–2019)

Personal information
- Full name: Kelvin Ruben Maynard
- Date of birth: 29 May 1987
- Place of birth: Paramaribo, Suriname
- Date of death: 18 September 2019 (aged 32)
- Place of death: Amsterdam, Netherlands
- Position: Right back

Youth career
- Zeeburgia
- FC Volendam

Senior career*
Years	Team	Apps	(Gls)
2006–2010	FC Volendam	82	(0)
2010–2011	Olhanense	1	(0)
2011	Kecskemét	8	(0)
2012–2013	FC Emmen	30	(4)
2013–2014	Royal Antwerp	27	(1)
2014–2016	Burton Albion	9	(1)
2017	SV Spakenburg	4	(1)
2017–2019	Quick Boys		
2019	Alphense Boys		
- * Club domestic league appearances and goals

Kelvin Ruben Maynard (29 May 1987 – 18 September 2019) was a Surinamese professional footballer who played as a right defender.

== Career ==
Born in Paramaribo, Suriname, Maynard made his professional debuts with FC Volendam, playing in four second division games in the 2006–07 season. He contributed with 35 appearances in his second year as the club promoted to Eredivisie.

Maynard made his top flight debut on 31 August 2008, in a 2–3 home loss against SC Heerenveen. The Other Oranje were eventually relegated back, after finishing in 18th position. In the 2010 off-season, he signed with S.C. Olhanense in Portugal, but his input with the Algarve outfit consisted of three League Cup games (three losses, including the 2–3 at S.L. Benfica).

On 5 July 2011, Maynard moved clubs and countries again, joining Kecskeméti TE in Hungary. He was released in December.

Maynard signed for English club Burton Albion in November 2014 until the end of the 2014–15 season. He extended his contract in July 2015. He was injured in August 2015, and ruled out for the 2015–16 season.

== Death ==
Maynard was shot and killed on 18 September 2019 in Amsterdam. He attempted to escape gunmen by driving towards a fire station in the area, but his car hit the building, and he was unable to be resuscitated by local firemen and medics.

He left a wife and a child of eight years.

== Personal life ==
Maynard's brother, Dehninio Muringen, is also a professional footballer.

== Honours ==
FC Volendam

- Eerste Divisie: 2007–08

Burton Albion

- Football League Two: 2014–15
