= Aleksandar Subić =

Bosnian footballer (born 1993)

Personal information
- Date of birth: 27 September 1993 (age 33)
- Place of birth: Banja Luka, Bosnia and Herzegovina
- Height: 1.78 m (5 ft 10 in)
- Position: Left-back

Team information
- Current team: BSK Banja Luka
- Number: 18

Youth career
- –2012: Borac Banja Luka

Senior career*
| Years | Team | Apps | (Gls) |
| 2012–2015 | Borac Banja Luka | 85 | (6) |
| 2015–2019 | Partizan | 10 | (0) |
| 2016–2017 | → Sloboda Tuzla (loan) | 22 | (4) |
| 2017–2018 | → Radnički Niš (loan) | 22 | (1) |
| 2019–2025 | Borac Banja Luka | 89 | (1) |
| 2026– | BSK Banja Luka | 16 | (1) |

International career
| 2013 | Bosnia and Herzegovina U21 | 1 | (0) |
- * Club domestic league appearances and goals as of 1 November 2026

Aleksandar Subić (Serbian Cyrillic: Александар Субић; born 27 September 1993) is a Bosnian professional footballer who play as a left-back for Bosnian Premier League club BSK Banja Luka.

== Club career ==
=== Early career ===
Subić is a product of the Borac Banja Luka youth academy. He made his senior debut for Borac in 2012. After Vladan Grujić moved to FK Voždovac, Subić became the first team captain for the 2015–16 season at Borac.

=== Partizan ===
Subić left Borac and signed a four-year deal with FK Partizan, the last day of the summer 2015 transfer period, and took the jersey number 19. His first official debut for Partizan was on 23 September 2015 in a game against FK Rad. On 1 October 2015, he debuted for Partizan on the European stage in the second round of the group stage of the Europa League against German Bundesliga club FC Augsburg. Subić played well until the 64th minute when he received a second yellow and he had to left the match, but luckily for him Partizan won 3–1. Due to a red card in Augsburg, Subić missed the game in which Partizan hosted Athletic Bilbao.

By the end of the group stage of the Europa League he played three more matches (against AZ Alkmaar, Athletic Bilbao and Augsburg). Those performances were not good enough for Partizan so he was sent on a loan to FK Sloboda Tuzla. He came back to Partizan in the summer od 2017, but was later sent on another loan to FK Radnički Niš where he was until his loan contract expired that summer. After his loan ended, Subić again came back to Partizan, but did not play a single game in the 2018–19 season.

=== Borac Banja Luka ===
After leaving Partizan in the summer of 2019 after his contract expired, on 6 July 2019, Subić signed a two-year contract with the club he started off his career at, Borac Banja Luka. In his first game since his return to Borac, the club tied 0–0 in a league match at home against FK Mladost Doboj Kakanj on 17 August 2019. Subić won his first trophy with Borac on 23 May 2021, getting crowned Bosnian Premier League champions one game before the end of the 2020–21 season.

== International career ==
Subić was a member of the Bosnia and Herzegovina U21 national team for who made one appearance in 2013. He later played for the Republika Srpska official U23 team in an unofficial game against Serbian side FK Teleoptik, played on 15 October 2014.

== Career statistics ==
=== Club ===
As of match played 1 November 2026

Appearances and goals by club, season and competition
| Club | Season | League | | | National cup (Note: Includes Bosnian Cup, Serbian Cup) | | Continental | | Total | |
| Club | Season | Division | Apps | Goals | Apps | Goals | Apps | Goals | Apps | Goals |
|---|---|---|---|---|---|---|---|---|---|---|
| Borac Banja Luka | 2011–12 | Bosnian Premier League | 4 | 0 | 0 | 0 | — | | 4 | 0 |
| Borac Banja Luka | 2012–13 | Bosnian Premier League | 21 | 1 | 1 | 0 | — | | 22 | 1 |
| Borac Banja Luka | 2013–14 | Bosnian Premier League | 28 | 1 | 2 | 0 | — | | 30 | 1 |
| Borac Banja Luka | 2014–15 | Bosnian Premier League | 26 | 4 | 7 | 1 | — | | 33 | 5 |
| Borac Banja Luka | 2015–16 | Bosnian Premier League | 6 | 0 | 0 | 0 | — | | 6 | 0 |
| Borac Banja Luka | Total | | 85 | 6 | 10 | 1 | — | | 95 | 7 |
| Partizan | 2015–16 | Serbian SuperLiga | 10 | 0 | 1 | 0 | 4 (Note: Appearances in UEFA Europa League) | 0 | 15 | 0 |
| Partizan | 2018–19 | Serbian SuperLiga | 0 | 0 | 0 | 0 | 0 | 0 | 0 | 0 |
| Partizan | Total | | 10 | 0 | 1 | 0 | 4 | 0 | 15 | 0 |
| Sloboda Tuzla (loan) | 2016–17 | Bosnian Premier League | 22 | 4 | 0 | 0 | — | | 22 | 4 |
| Radnički Niš (loan) | 2017–18 | Serbian SuperLiga | 22 | 1 | 1 | 0 | — | | 23 | 1 |
| Borac Banja Luka | 2019–20 | Bosnian Premier League | 3 | 0 | — | | — | | 3 | 0 |
| Borac Banja Luka | 2020–21 | Bosnian Premier League | 24 | 1 | 5 | 0 | 0 | 0 | 28 | 1 |
| Borac Banja Luka | 2021–22 | Bosnian Premier League | 28 | 0 | 2 | 0 | 4 (Note: Two appearances in UEFA Champions League; two appearances in UEFA Europa Conference League) | 0 | 34 | 0 |
| Borac Banja Luka | 2022–23 | Bosnian Premier League | 24 | 0 | 1 | 0 | 2 (Note: Appearances in UEFA Europa Conference League) | 0 | 27 | 0 |
| Borac Banja Luka | 2023–24 | Bosnian Premier League | 5 | 0 | 3 | 0 | 1 | 0 | 9 | 0 |
| Borac Banja Luka | 2024–25 | Bosnian Premier League | 5 | 0 | 3 | 0 | 2 (Note: One appearance in UEFA Europa League; one appearance in UEFA Conference League) | 0 | 10 | 0 |
| Borac Banja Luka | Total | | 89 | 1 | 14 | 0 | 9 | 0 | 112 | 1 |
| BSK Banja Luka | 2025–26 | First League of RS | 6 | 0 | — | | — | | 6 | 0 |
| BSK Banja Luka | 2026–27 | Bosnian Premier League | 10 | 1 | 0 | 0 | — | | 10 | 1 |
| BSK Banja Luka | Total | | 16 | 1 | 0 | 0 | — | | 16 | 1 |
| Career total | | | 244 | 13 | 26 | 1 | 13 | 0 | 283 | 14 |

== Honours ==
Partizan

- Serbian Cup: 2015–16

Borac Banja Luka

- Bosnian Premier League: 2020–21, 2023–24
