= Siniša Radanović =

Serbian footballer

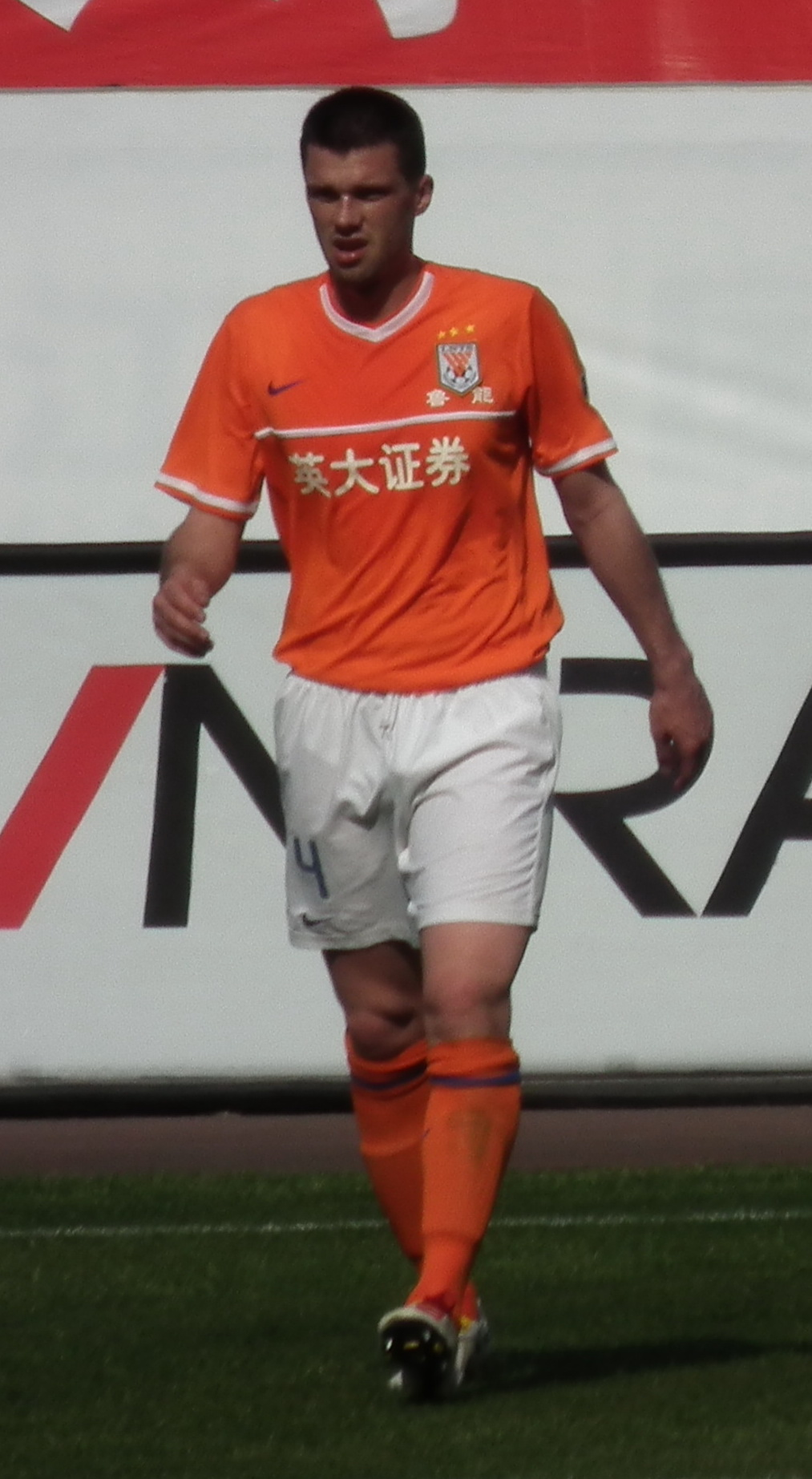
- Radanović with Shandong Luneng in May 2010

Personal information
- Full name: Siniša Radanović
- Date of birth: 23 November 1979 (age 46)
- Place of birth: Subotica, SFR Yugoslavia
- Height: 1.94 m (6 ft 4 1/2 in)
- Position: Defender

Senior career*
Years	Team	Apps	(Gls)
1998–2001	Vrbas	70	(3)
2002–2006	Mladost Apatin	90	(11)
2006–2007	Hajduk Kula	27	(5)
2007–2008	Vitória Guimarães	4	(0)
2008–2009	Hajduk Kula	42	(6)
2010	Shandong Luneng	10	(0)
2010	Hajduk Kula	13	(1)
2011	Kecskemét	23	(1)
2012–2013	Borac Čačak	33	(4)
Total		312	(31)
- * Club domestic league appearances and goals

Siniša Radanović (Serbian Cyrillic: Синиша Радановић; born 23 November 1979) is a Serbian former professional footballer who played as a defender.

After starting out at Vrbas, Radanović represented Mladost Apatin, Hajduk Kula (three spells), and Borac Čačak in his homeland. He also played for Vitória Guimarães, Shandong Luneng, and Kecskemét in the top leagues of Portugal, China, and Hungary, respectively.
