= Velimir Stojnić =

Bosnian footballer (born 1962)

Personal information
- Date of birth: 29 October 1962 (age 63)
- Place of birth: Banja Luka, SFR Yugoslavia
- Height: 1.84 m (6 ft 0 in)
- Positions: Defender; midfielder

Team information
- Current team: Bratstvo Kozinci

Youth career
- 1972–1979: Borac Banja Luka

Senior career*
Years	Team	Apps	(Gls)
1979–1998	Borac Banja Luka	184	(18)

International career
1978–1980	Yugoslavia U16		

Managerial career
- 2002–2011: Bosnia and Herzegovina U17
- 2008: Modriča (caretaker)
- 2009–2010: Borac Banja Luka
- 2011–2012: Borac Banja Luka
- 2012–2013: Rudar Prijedor
- 2015–2017: Kozara Gradiška
- 2019–2020: Krupa U17
- 2020: Krupa
- 2024–2025: Omarska
- 2025–: Bratstvo Kozinci
- * Club domestic league appearances and goals

Velimir Stojnić (Serbian Cyrillic: Велимир Стојнић; born 29 October 1962) is a Bosnian professional football manager and former player who is the manager of Second League of the Republika Srpska club Bratstvo Kozinci.

== Managerial career ==
Stojnić took up the hot seat of Rudar Prijedor in March 2012 after Dragan Radović was sacked. He succeeded Zoran Marić as manager of Krupa in September 2020.

== Honours ==
=== Player ===
Borac Banja Luka

- Yugoslav Cup: 1987–88
- Mitropa Cup: 1992
