= Boban Đerić =

Bosnian footballer (born 1993)

Personal information
- Date of birth: 20 August 1993 (age 33)
- Place of birth: Loznica, SR Yugoslavia
- Height: 1.80 m (5 ft 11 in)
- Position: Right-back

Team information
- Current team: Tuzla City
- Number: 77

Youth career
- Drina Zvornik
- 2011–2012: Inđija

Senior career*
Years	Team	Apps	(Gls)
2010–2011	Drina Zvornik	14	(0)
2011–2012	Inđija	3	(0)
2012–2014	Leotar	37	(1)
2014–2015	Drina Zvornik	39	(1)
2016–2017	Vitez	45	(0)
2018–2020	Javor Ivanjica	55	(1)
2020–	Tuzla City	16	(0)

International career
2011	Bosnia and Herzegovina U19	1	(0)
- * Club domestic league appearances and goals as of 7 May 2021

Boban Đerić (Serbian Cyrillic: Бобан Ђерић; born 20 August 1993) is a Bosnian professional footballer who plays as a right-back for Bosnian Premier League club Tuzla City.

== Club career ==
Born in Loznica, SR Yugoslavia, Đerić is among the group of players from the Bosnian side of the river Drina that was born in the maternity of Loznica located in Serbia because the maternity covers a vast territory on both sides of the border between Serbia and Bosnia and Herzegovina.

He made his senior debut while playing in with Drina Zvornik by making 14 appearances in the 2010–11 Bosnian Premier League season. His debut made such an impact that called the attention of the Bosnia and Herzegovina U19 national team which gave him 3 calls and allowing his to debut in one.

This increase of popularity and labeling as a future talent, called the attention of neighbouring Serbian side Inđija which always kept aspirations to return to the top-league after their debut season a year before. However, Đerić faced tough competition, and in the 2011–12 Serbian First League, he managed to make only 3 league appearances. Wanting more playing time, he decided to return to Bosnia and Herzegovina and joined Bosnian Premier League club Leotar. There he played two seasons as a regular, but at the end of the second season Leotar got relegated, and, in the summer of 2014, Đerić returned to his original club, Drina Zvornik who was playing in the Premier League at the time.

After a year and half at Drina, Đerić became a target of the ambitious Premier Leagie side Vitez, who´se first signings during the winter-break of the 2015–16 season, were him and Mario Barić. He struggled with injuries during the first half-season, but fully recovered, he shined, making 26 league appearances. He continued his regular performance in the next season, and this again called the attention of other clubs.

After a solid first half of the 2017–18 season, making all the 17 possible appearances, it was Serbian side Javor Ivanjica who made an offer and brought him to their squad to help them avoid relegation in the 2017–18 Serbian SuperLiga. Despite the efforts, Javor finished 15th out of 16 and got relegation, however, Đerić stayed with the club as the club management had a plan to return to the top-flight the sooner the better. And so it was. Javor made a strong season in the 2018–19 Serbian First League, secured second place, and gained promotion to the 2019–20 Serbian SuperLiga. Not only that, but Đerić was elected to the best eleven of the 2018–19 Serbian First League season, along 3 more playmates from Javor. He became Javor's indisputable right-back, and was so in the 2019–20 Serbian SuperLiga as well.

After leaving Javor, on 24 June 2020, Đerić came back to the Bosnian Premier League and signed a one-year contract with Tuzla City. He made his official debut for Tuzla City on 8 August 2020 in a league match against Krupa.

== International career ==
In 2011, Đerić debuted for the Bosnia and Herzegovina U19 national team.
