= Igor Žuržinov =

Serbian footballer

Personal information
- Date of birth: 30 May 1981 (age 45)
- Place of birth: Pančevo, SFR Yugoslavia
- Height: 1.83 m (6 ft 0 in)
- Position: Defender

Senior career*
Years	Team	Apps	(Gls)
2001–2003	Dinamo Pančevo		
2004–2005	Slavija Sarajevo	25	(1)
2005–2010	Zrinjski Mostar	111	(9)
2010–2011	Istra 1961	20	(0)
2011–2013	Zrinjski Mostar	35	(5)
2013–2014	Borac Banja Luka	25	(0)
Total		216	(15)
- * Club domestic league appearances and goals

Igor Žuržinov (born 30 May 1981) is a Serbian former professional footballer who played as a defender.
