= Jovica Stokić =

Bosnian footballer

Joco Stokić
Personal information
- Full name: Jovica Stokić
- Date of birth: 7 April 1987 (age 39)
- Place of birth: Gradačac, SR Bosnia, SFR Yugoslavia
- Height: 1.83 m (6 ft 0 in)
- Positions: Second striker; attacking midfielder

Team information
- Current team: FK Borac Šamac

Senior career*
Years	Team	Apps	(Gls)
2004–2010	Modriča	73	(14)
2010	Budapest Honvéd	1	(0)
2011	Zvijezda Gradačac	6	(0)
2011	Kecskemét	10	(2)
2012	BSK Borča	6	(0)
2012–2013	Borac Banja Luka	43	(22)
2014	Jeju United	5	(0)
2014–2015	Borac Banja Luka	26	(10)
2015–2016	Željezničar Sarajevo	14	(0)
2016	Radnik Bijeljina	8	(1)
2016	Al-Jahra	11	(4)
2017	Čelik Zenica	5	(1)
2017–2019	Tuzla City	30	(1)
2019	Sloga GC	11	(3)
2019–2020	Alfa Modriča	11	(2)
2020–	FK Borac Šamac		
Total		260	(60)

International career
2005	Bosnia-Herzegovina U19	3	(0)
	Bosnia-Herzegovina U21	1	(0)

Managerial career
- 12.9.2023-: FK Alfa Modriča
- * Club domestic league appearances and goals as of 4 October 2017

Jovica "Joco" Stokić (Serbian Cyrillic: Јовица "Јоцо" Стокић; born 7 April 1987 in Gradačac) is a Bosnian professional footballer who plays for FK Borac Šamac after a spell at FK Alfa Modriča.

== Club career ==
After playing 5 years with FK Modriča he moved abroad to Hungary in summer 2010 by signing with Nemzeti Bajnokság I side Budapest Honvéd FC. During the winter break he moved back to Bosnia to play with NK Zvijezda Gradačac in the Bosnian Premier League but next summer he moved back to Hungary this time to play with another top flight club, Kecskeméti TE. During the winter break of the 2011–12 season he moved to Serbia to play with SuperLiga side FK BSK Borča. In summer 2017 he left Čelik Zenica after spells earlier in Kuwait and with Bosnian powerhouses Borac Banja Luka and Željezničar Sarajevo among others.

On 18 January 2019, Stokić joined OFK Sloga. Stokić then joined FK Alfa Modriča ahead of the 2019/20 season.

== International career ==
He was part of the Bosnian U19 and U21 teams.
