= Vladan Grujić =

Bosnian footballer (born 1981)

Personal information
- Full name: Vladan Grujić
- Date of birth: 17 May 1981 (age 45)
- Place of birth: Banja Luka, SFR Yugoslavia
- Height: 1.83 m (6 ft 0 in)
- Position: Defensive midfielder

Senior career*
Years	Team	Apps	(Gls)
1998–2001	Borac Banja Luka	45	(23)
1999–2000	→ Obilić (loan)	0	(0)
2002	Red Star Belgrade	3	(0)
2003	Borac Banja Luka	39	(11)
2004	1. FC Köln	12	(0)
2005	Alania Vladikavkaz	26	(0)
2006	Litex Lovech	15	(0)
2007	Sarajevo	39	(7)
2008–2009	Moss	41	(3)
2010	Laktaši	14	(2)
2010–2011	AEP Paphos	27	(3)
2011–2012	Aris Limassol	9	(0)
2012–2013	AEP Paphos	5	(0)
2013–2015	Borac Banja Luka	62	(3)
2015–2016	Voždovac	7	(0)

International career
- Bosnia and Herzegovina U21
2003–2006	Bosnia and Herzegovina	24	(0)
- * Club domestic league appearances and goals

Vladan Grujić (Serbian Cyrillic: Владан Грујић; born 17 May 1981) is a Bosnian retired footballer who played as a defensive midfielder.

== Club career ==
Born in Banja Luka, SR Bosnia and Herzegovina, back then within Yugoslavia, Vladan Grujić played for FK Borac Banja Luka and Serbian clubs FK Obilić and Red Star Belgrade. Since, Grujić has played for the German club 1. FC Köln before moving to Alania Vladikavkaz. In January 2006, he left Alania on a free transfer and joined Bulgarian side Litex Lovech on 28 January 2007. He signed a six-month contract with FK Sarajevo.

On 29 February 2008, he signed a three-year contract with Norwegian club Moss FK.

In November 2009, he was released by Moss FK and was available on free transfer.

In January 2010, he was on trial at the Polish second division club Gornik Zabrze.

In June 2011, he signed a two-year contract with Cypriot club Aris Limassol F.C.

On 21 July 2015, after playing two seasons with FK Borac Banja Luka in the Bosnian Premier League, Grujić returns to Serbia, this time by signing with top-flight club FK Voždovac.

== International career ==
Grujić made his debut for Bosnia and Herzegovina in an October 2002 European Championship qualification match away against Norway and has earned a total of 24 caps, scoring no goals. His final international was an October 2006 European Championship qualification match against Greece.
