= Republika Srpska Cup =

Association football tournament

- Founded: 1993
- Region: Bosnia and Herzegovina → Republika Srpska
- Current champions: Borac Banja Luka (8th title)
- Most championships: Borac Banja Luka (8 titles)
- Website: Kup Republike Srpske (in Serbian)
- 2026–27 Republika Srpska Cup

The Cup of Republika Srpska (Serbian: Kуп Peпубликe Cpпcкe / Kup Republike Srpske), also just known as the Republika Srpska Cup, is a secondary knockout football competition contested annually by clubs from the entity Republika Srpska, Bosnia and Herzegovina. The competition is run by the Football Association of Republika Srpska.

== Cup winners ==
=== Seasons boycotting Bosnia and Herzegovina's FA (1993–2002) ===
Season	Winner	Score	Runner-up
1993–94	Kozara Gradiška	0–0; Pen. 7–6	Sloga Doboj
1994–95	Borac Banja Luka	3–2, 2–2; Agg. 5–4	Rudar Prijedor
1995–96	Borac Banja Luka	1–0, 1–2; Agg. 2–2	Jedinstvo Brčko
1996–97	Sloga Trn	1–0	Romanija Pale
1997–98	Rudar Ugljevik	0–0; Pen. 4–2	Boksit Milići
1998–99	Rudar Ugljevik	0–0; Pen. 4–3	Sloga Trn
1999–00	Kozara Gradiška	1–0	Sloboda Novi Grad
2000–01	Kozara Gradiška	3–0	Boksit Milići
2001–02	Leotar	2–1	Kozara Gradiška

=== Seasons as a Secondary Cup in Bosnia and Herzegovina (2002–present) ===
Season	Winner	Score	Runner-up
2002–03	Jedinstvo Brčko	1–0	Modriča
2003–04	Leotar	0–0; Pen. 6–5	Modriča
2004–05	Jedinstvo Brčko	3–2	Sloga Doboj
2005–06	Slavija Sarajevo	3–2	Rudar Prijedor
2006–07	Modriča	2–1	Radnik Bijeljina
2007–08	Slavija Sarajevo	3–2	Borac Banja Luka
2008–09	Borac Banja Luka	4–0	Radnik Bijeljina
2009–10	Radnik Bijeljina	1–0, 1–2; Agg. 2–2	Kozara Gradiška
2010–11	Borac Banja Luka	2–0	Radnik Bijeljina
2011–12	Borac Banja Luka	0–0; Pen. 3–1	Sloboda Mrkonjić Grad
2012–13	Radnik Bijeljina	0–1, 1–0; Agg. 1–1 (Pen. 4–2)	Borac Banja Luka
2013–14	Radnik Bijeljina	0–0; Pen. 5–3	Rudar Prijedor
2014–15	Rudar Prijedor	2–1, 2–0; Agg. 4–1	Krupa
2015–16	Radnik Bijeljina	3–2	Sloboda Novi Grad
2016–17	Radnik Bijeljina	2–0, 2–1; Agg. 4–1	Leotar
2017–18	Radnik Bijeljina	1–1; Pen. 6–5	Krupa
2018–19	Radnik Bijeljina	3–1	Krupa
2019–20	Abandoned due to COVID-19 pandemic in Bosnia and Herzegovina		
2020–21	Leotar	2–0	Krupa
2021–22	Krupa	2–0	Rudar Prijedor
2022–23	Borac Banja Luka	2–1	Laktaši
2023–24	Zvijezda 09	1–1; Pen. 7–6	Sloga Doboj
2024–25	Borac Banja Luka	2–1	Leotar
2025–26	Borac Banja Luka	3–0	Radnik Bijeljina

== Performance by club ==
Club	Winners	Winning years	Runners-up	Runners-up years
Borac Banja Luka	8	1995, 1996, 2009, 2011, 2012, 2023, 2025, 2026	2	2008, 2013
Radnik Bijeljina	7	2010, 2013, 2014, 2016, 2017, 2018, 2019	4	2007, 2009, 2011, 2026
Kozara Gradiška	3	1994, 2000, 2001	2	2002, 2010
Leotar	3	2002, 2004, 2021	1	2017
Jedinstvo Brčko	2	2003, 2005	1	1996
Rudar Ugljevik	2	1998, 1999	—	—
Slavija Sarajevo	2	2006, 2008	—	—
Rudar Prijedor	1	2015	4	1995, 2006, 2014, 2022
Krupa	1	2022	4	2015, 2018, 2019, 2021
Modriča	1	2007	2	2003, 2004
Sloga Trn	1	1997	1	1999
Zvijezda 09	1	2024	0	—
Sloga Doboj	—	—	3	1994, 2005, 2024
Boksit Milići	—	—	2	1998, 2001
Sloboda Novi Grad	—	—	2	2000, 2016
Romanija Pale	—	—	1	1997
Sloboda Mrkonjić Grad	—	—	1	2012
Laktaši	—	—	1	2023

== See also ==
- Football Federation of Bosnia and Herzegovina
- Football Association of Republika Srpska
- Premier League of Bosnia and Herzegovina
- First League of the Republika Srpska
- Bosnian football league system
