= FK Rudar Prijedor =

Bosnian association football club

Rudar Prijedor
- Full name: Fudbalski klub Rudar Prijedor
- Nickname: Rudar
- Founded: 3 May 1928; 98 years ago
- Ground: Gradski stadion
- Capacity: 3,540
- Chairman: Stanko Vujković
- Manager: Goran Kecman
- League: First League of RS
- 2025–26: Premier League BH, 10th of 10 (relegated)
Home colours	Away colours

Fudbalski klub Rudar Prijedor (Serbian Cyrillic: Фудбалски клуб Pудаp Пpиjeдop) is a professional football club from the city of Prijedor that is situated in Republika Srpska, Bosnia and Herzegovina.

Rudar plays in the First League of the Republika Srpska, and the club plays its home matches on the Gradski stadion which has a capacity that can hold 6,000 spectators.

== History ==
=== Early years ===
The first football was brought to Prijedor in 1918 by Sveto Radetić, Stevan Mitrinović and Pero Čanak, who bought the ball from Austria. In 1919 the first football club was formed by the name of "PNK – Prijedorski nogometni klub" and in 1925 renamed into "Slavija". The first official match was played against FK Sloboda Bosanski Novi, a defeat by 0–10, and it was played so the club could formally join the regional federation and start competing. In 1925 another club was formed in the town FK Građanski, and in 1925 the first field with stands for spectators was built.

More clubs were being formed in the decade of the 1920s. FK Borac was created in 1925 with its field in Lukavica, FK Rudar Ljubija in 1928 and still before the beginning of World War II, the clubs of FK Hajduk in Prijedor, and FK Zmaj from Kozarac, were formed.

The predecessor of today's Rudar Prijedor is FK Rudar Ljubija that was formed on May 3, 1928, in the mining town of Ljubija.

After the end of the war, much help for the development of football in Prijedor was provided by the local paper factory and the iron mining company "Ljubija" from neighbouring Ljubija. The clubs of Grmeč, Željezničar, Jedinstvo and Mladost were formed. In 1954 FK Celuloza was formed, followed by the merger with Mladost and its renaming into FK Radnički in 1958. FK Željezničar merged with FK Radnički, forming OFK Prijedor in 1965. During the following decades great cooperation existed between OFK Prijedor and FK Rudar Ljubić, resulting in a merger between these two clubs in 2005 and subsequent creation of today's FK Rudar Prijedor.

The first official match that Rudar Ljubija played was against local Hajduk in 1929. The match ended with a 2–1 victory for Rudar, and the players in that match were Branko Bjekić, Sadik Burazerović, Milan Prerad, Ivan Sedlaček, Toni Hribar, Drago Nedić, Poldek Mastinjak, Jovo Gvozden, Tone Vikić, Josip Brečević and Božidar Veslić. Among the best players from that early period are also worth mentioning: Ivica Sedlaček, Božo Jelisić and Nikola Lukić.

FK Rudar Ljubija established close ties with many other working-class clubs, especially from the region of Bosnian Krajina, but even further, with clubs as: FK Borac Banja Luka, FK Mladost Prijedor, NK Jedinstvo Bihać, FK Sloboda Bosanski Novi, FK Borac Drvar, FK Borac Bosanska Dubica, FK Velež Mostar, RNK Split, FK Borac Čačak, FK Radnički Kragujevac, among others.

The club didn't compete during the economic crisis between 1931 and 1933 when the mine was almost shut down, with many miners being left without work and in hard living conditions. The economic situation was only improved by 1934 and 1935, and the first match after this economic depression was played July 26, 1936 against FK Zmaj from Kozarci, a win 6–1. In this period it is worthwhile to mention the special contribution and financial support provided to the club and its players by Mr. Dr. Mladen Stojanović, a longtime mdoctor in the mine, a humanist and afterwards a leader of the Partisans from Kozara during WWII. Most players participated in the miners strike in August and September 1940. With the beginning of the war, the club ceased its activities, and most of the club staff joined the partisans in their war against the invading Axis powers, many having lost their lives during the war.

=== (1945–1992) ===
The region of Ljubija and Prijedor was liberated on September 7, 1944, and the first match was played in July 1945 against Partisans unit team. During 1945 and 1946 many friendly matches were played, and those served as a base for the new Rudar team that would compete in the post-war Yugoslavia. In 1947 Rudar joined the Association of Banja Luka. In 1948 a new stadium was built, and in that same year the club started competing in the Yugoslav Cup.

The first success was achieved in 1952 when the club qualified to the regional Bosnia and Herzegovina republic League. A decade later, in 1962, the club achieved further promotion, but it was only in 1967, and after three unsuccessful attempts, that Rudar managed to achieve promotion to the national rang, and qualify to the Yugoslav Second League group West. To achieve this the club had to win NK Slaven Živinice and NK GOŠK Dubrovnik. The players that made this possible were: Izetagić, Bevandić, Baškot, Mustedanagić, Miljević, Radinović, Dervić, Bećarević, Bekan, Porobić and Gombović.

In this period the mining activity was having a major growth, with new mines being opened in other parts of Prijedor's municipality. Prijedor had become the center of production of iron mining, and the direction of the mines moved into the town in 1967. The club also followed, and the direction moved as well to Prijedor, where a new and bigger stadium was available for the club that was now competing at national level and had a growing mass of supporters.

In 1970 Rudar reached the 1/16 final of the Yugoslav Cup playing in its first ever TV-transmitted match, against top league OFK Belgrade. Rudar lost 0–2 and the players that played that match were: Janković, Omerbašić, Porobić, Talić, Milijević, Okanović, Ličina, Damjanović, Torić, Bevandić i Gombović.

In the season 1970/71 Rudar qualified for the knock-out stage for the qualifications for the Yugoslav First League. The opponent was FK Spartak Subotica. In Subotica Rudar displayed a strong exhibition, ending the match with a 2–2 draw. The second hand match played in Prijedor in front of a 10,000 spectators crowd, the team aware of the importance of the match has tremble and ended up losing by 1–3. In this generation are found players like: Janković, Hidić, Vukelja, A. Bašić, Porobić, Škondro, Gombović, Vidović, Ličina, Mandić, Bevandić, Damjanović and Crnkić. The coach was Radoslav Zubanović.

The defeat against Spartak had obvious consequences, and the club finished bottom of the league in 1971/72 and returned to regional republic league. However, in 1974 the club reached the 1/4 finals of the Yugoslav Cup. In 1976 the club returned to the Yugoslav Second League group West, finishing 13th, in 1977/78 was 6th but in 1978/79 was relegated. In December 1979 an entire generation of footballers that provided much success for the club played their fairway match Miroslav Janković, Ivo Baškarada, Omer Bašić, Kemal Porobić, Ante Gombović, Nikola Bevandić, Simo Damjanović, Slobodan Ličina, Aki Bašić, Emsud Ramulić and Ibrahim Okanović-Špico.

In 1981 the club was even further relegated, and the recovery only began in 1983. In the season 1983/84 Rudar returned to the Second League, and the players that earned this promotion were: Sead Rešić, Vitomir Samardžija, Muhamed Cerić, Sabid Sadiković, Vinko Škondro, Mladen Parhamov, Vinko Samardžija, Goran Pekija, Zoran Vuković, Mirzet Bejzurić, Zlatko Abdulović, Fahrudin Bihorac, Edin Begović, Mladen Ćulum, Ilija Marin, Žarko Mandić, Bajram Zgog, Novo Bešević, reserves Panić, Hrvat, Duratović, and the coach Nikola Bevandić.

In 1987/88 the club missed just one point and didn't qualify for the newly formed unified Yugoslav Second League by a goal difference. It achieved that in the following season, 1988/89, by finishing first in the Inter-republics League West, thus qualifying to the Second League.

In 1990 Rudar reached the semi-finals of the Yugoslav Cup, eliminating in its way two top-league clubs, FK Vardar and FK Vojvodina, and playing against another top-league club, FK Velež Mostar in the semis. The first match played in Mostar ended with a minimal 1–0 win for Velež, with the goal being scored by a disputed penalty. The second hand, played in Prijedor in front of a 6,000-spectator crowd, ended up with Rudar winning by same result, 1–0, Bijaljac being the scorer of the lone goal. In the subsequent penalty shoot-out, Velež won. The players of this last match were Rešić, Madžo, Drljača, Lukić, Bihorac, Kevrić, Mušić, substitute Karaman, Vojkić, Kaltak, substitute Zdjelar, and Bjeljac. The coach was Radoslav Zubanović.

=== Recent years ===
With the beginning of the Bosnian War and the break-up of Yugoslavia, the club ceased its activities in 1992. Even in this difficult period, the passion for football was such that the players of FK Rudar Ljubija and OFK Prijedor joined and formed FK Rudar Prijedor. With the end of the war, the club began competing again, and reached the Republika Srpska Cup final in 1995.

Since 1995 the club played 12 times in the First League of Republika Srpska and twice in the Second League. In the season 2008–09 the club finished first and qualified to the 2002-created Premier League of Bosnia and Herzegovina. The following players managed this promotion: Kondić, Despotović, Dobrijević, Muzgonja, Ilinčić, Kovačević, Brkić, Stijepić, Kantar, Golić, Kecman, Dašić and Kotoran. The coach was Darko Nestorović, the Sports Director was Mladen Zgonjanin, the President of the Direction was Branislav Rokvić, and the President of the club's Assembly was Božo Grbić. After the qualification to the Premier League the reconstruction of the stadium began, with the participation of the Prijedor municipality.

On 15 May 2021, Rudar got promoted back from the First League of RS to the Bosnian Premier League.

== Honours ==
=== Domestic ===
==== League ====
- First League of the Republika Srpska
  - Winners (3): 2008–09, 2014–15, 2020–21
  - Runners-up (3): 1995–96, 2017–18, 2019–20

==== Cups ====
- Republika Srpska Cup
  - Winners (1): 2014–15
  - Runners-up (3): 1994–95, 2005–06, 2013–14

== Players ==
=== Current squad ===
As of 17 February 2026

Note: Flags indicate national team as defined under FIFA eligibility rules; some limited exceptions apply. Players may hold more than one non-FIFA nationality.

No.	Pos.	Nation	Player
2	DF	SRB	Đuro-Giulio Đekić
3	DF	ESP	Roberto Corral
5	DF	BIH	Nemanja Pekija
6	DF	ITA	Fabrizio Danese
7	FW	ESP	Dani Romera
8	MF	ESP	Andrés Mohedano
9	FW	CRO	Max Galić
14	MF	ESP	Fernán Ferreiroá
15	MF	BIH	Marko Šebez
16	MF	BIH	Tarik Ramić
17	MF	AUT	Marcel Ritzmaier
18	DF	BIH	Muharem Trako

No.	Pos.	Nation	Player
21	FW	ESP	Jorge Bolívar
23	DF	COL	Camilo Puentes
27	MF	ESP	Dani Molina
31	FW	GEQ	Jordan Gutiérrez
45	FW	BIH	Stefan Marčetić (on loan from Borac Banja Luka)
47	DF	ESP	Álvaro Roncal
70	FW	GEO	Demetre Gvasalia
77	FW	BIH	Nedim Keranović
88	MF	BIH	Viktor Grbić
91	FW	SRB	Aleksa Mrđa
92	GK	SRB	Vasilije Žunić
99	GK	MNE	Mišo Dubljanić (captain)

=== Out on loan ===
Note: Flags indicate national team as defined under FIFA eligibility rules; some limited exceptions apply. Players may hold more than one non-FIFA nationality.

No.	Pos.	Nation	Player
1	GK	BIH	Aleksa Trninić (at Omarska until 30 June 2026)
22	DF	BIH	Boško Radinović (at Omarska until 30 June 2026)

No.	Pos.	Nation	Player
28	MF	GHA	Joseph Amoah (at Čelik Zenica until 30 June 2026)

== Managerial history ==
- (Socialist Federal Republic of Yugoslavia) Radoslav Zubanović
- (Socialist Federal Republic of Yugoslavia) Srboljub Markušević
- (Socialist Federal Republic of Yugoslavia) Mladen Zgonjanin
- (North Macedonia) Milko Djurovski (2003)
- (Bosnia and Herzegovina) Vito Samardžija
- (Serbia) Mihajlo Bošnjak
- (Bosnia and Herzegovina) Darko Nestorović (2009–2010)
- (Bosnia and Herzegovina) Zoran Bujić (interim) (19 March 2010 – 25 March 2010)
- (Bosnia and Herzegovina) Boris Gavran (26 March 2010 – 13 June 2011)
- (Bosnia and Herzegovina) Dragan Radović (13 June 2011 – 25 March 2012)
- (Bosnia and Herzegovina) Velimir Stojnić (26 March 2012 – 23 March 2013)
- (Bosnia and Herzegovina) Vlado Čapljić (25 March 2013 – 31 May 2013)
- (Bosnia and Herzegovina) Slobodan Starčević (11 June 2013 – 18 September 2013)
- (Bosnia and Herzegovina) Boris Gavran (18 September 2013 – 3 February 2014)
- (North Macedonia) Gorazd Mihajlov (3 February 2014 – 19 March 2014)
- (Bosnia and Herzegovina) Darko Nestorović (19 March 2014 – 26 December 2014)
- (Bosnia and Herzegovina) Zoran Bujić (January 2015 – June 2015)
- (Bosnia and Herzegovina) Boris Gavran (18 June 2015 – 1 November 2015)
- (Bosnia and Herzegovina) Zlatko Jelisavac (4 November 2015 – 3 May 2018)
- (Bosnia and Herzegovina) Nedžad Žerić (3 May 2018 – 22 June 2019)
- (Bosnia and Herzegovina) Igor Janković (22 June 2019 – 12 May 2020)
- (Bosnia and Herzegovina) Boris Savić (21 May 2020 – 18 April 2021)
- (Croatia) Nikica Milenković (June 11 2021 – 11 October 2021)
- (Bosnia and Herzegovina) Marko Tešić (14 October 2021 – 5 March 2022)
- (Bosnia and Herzegovina) Srđan Marjanović (5 March 2022 – 6 June 2022)
- (Bosnia and Herzegovina) Zoran Bujić (7 June 2022 – 6 October 2022)
- (Bosnia and Herzegovina) Bojan Krulj (11 January 2023 – 25 September 2023)
- (Bosnia and Herzegovina) Vule Trivunović (9 October 2023 – 24 January 2025)
- (Bosnia and Herzegovina) Goran Kecman (31 January 2025 – 18 June 2025)
- (Serbia) Perica Ognjenović (18 June 2025 – 30 June 2026)
