= 1983–84 FK Sarajevo season =

Sarajevo
1983–84 season
- Director general: Svetozar Vujović
- President: Alija Alić
- Manager: Boško Antić
- Stadium: Koševo City Stadium; Grbavica Stadium
- Yugoslav First League: 9th
- Yugoslav Cup: Quarter-finals
- Top goalscorer: League: H. Musemić 9 All: Husref Musemić 11
- Highest home attendance: 30,000 vs Red Star (30 May 1984)
- Lowest home attendance: 1,500 vs Dinamo Vinkovci (16 November 1983)
- Average home league attendance: 9,971
- Biggest win: Sarajevo 6–0 Prishtina (18 September 1983)
- Biggest defeat: Željezničar 5–2 Sarajevo (18 March 1984)

The 1983–84 Sarajevo season was the club's 37th season in history, and their 35th season in the top flight of Yugoslav football, the Yugoslav First League. Besides competing in the First League, the team competed in the National Cup.

== Squad information ==
=== First-team squad ===
Note: Flags indicate national team as defined under FIFA eligibility rules; some limited exceptions apply. Players may hold more than one non-FIFA nationality.

No.	Pos.	Nation	Player
—	GK	YUG	Miloš Đurković
—	GK	YUG	Slobodan Janjuš
—	DF	YUG	Tomislav Bošnjak
—	DF	YUG	Dragan Božović
—	DF	YUG	Nijaz Ferhatović
6	DF	YUG	Faruk Hadžibegić
—	DF	YUG	Srđan Jovanović
—	DF	YUG	Davor Jozić
—	DF	YUG	Goran Jurišić
—	DF	YUG	Mirza Kapetanović
—	DF	YUG	Nihad Milak
—	DF	YUG	Ferid Radeljaš
—	DF	YUG	Ante Rajković

No.	Pos.	Nation	Player
—	MF	YUG	Boban Božović
—	MF	YUG	Edim Hadžialagić
—	MF	YUG	Mehmed Janjoš
—	MF	YUG	Senad Merdanović
11	MF	YUG	Predrag Pašić (Captain)
—	MF	YUG	Jasminko Velić
—	MF	YUG	Ivica Vujičević
—	MF	YUG	Slaviša Vukičević
—	FW	YUG	Esad Hošić
—	FW	YUG	Husref Musemić
—	FW	YUG	Vladimir Petković
7	FW	YUG	Zijad Švrakić
—	FW	YUG	Muhidin Teskeredžić

== Kit ==
Sponsor
jutro

== Competitions ==
=== Overview ===
Competition	First match	Last match	Starting round	Final position	Record							
Competition	First match	Last match	Starting round	Final position	Pld	W	D	L	GF	GA	GD	Win %
First League	14 August 1983	30 May 1984	Matchday 1	9th	34	11	10	13	53	46	+7	32.35
Yugoslav Cup	13 September 1983	18 April 1984	Round of 32	Quarter-finals	3	2	0	1	7	5	+2	66.67
Total					37	13	10	14	60	51	+9	35.14

Source: Competitions

=== Yugoslav First League ===
==== League table ====
Pos	Team	Pld	W	D	L	GF	GA	GD	Pts
7	Radnički Niš	34	15	3	16	40	47	−7	33
8	Priština	34	15	3	16	36	55	−19	33
9	Sarajevo	34	11	10	13	53	46	+7	32
10	Vojvodina	34	11	10	13	39	36	+3	32
11	Dinamo Vinkovci	34	11	10	13	41	54	−13	32

Source: rsssf.org
Rules for classification: 1) points; 2) goal difference; 3) number of goals scored.

==== Matches ====
14 August 1983 1	Sarajevo	1–2	Velež	Sarajevo
		Report		Stadium: Koševo City Stadium; Attendance: 10,000

21 August 1983 2	Radnički	1–3	Sarajevo	Niš
		Report		Stadium: Čair Stadium; Attendance: 8,000

28 August 1983 3	Sarajevo	0–0	Hajduk	Sarajevo
		Report		Stadium: Koševo City Stadium; Attendance: 20,000

31 August 1983 4	Sloboda	2–2	Sarajevo	Tuzla
		Report		Stadium: Tušanj City Stadium; Attendance: 8,000

4 September 1983 5	Sarajevo	1–1	Željezničar	Sarajevo
		Report		Stadium: Koševo City Stadium; Attendance: 25,000

11 September 1983 6	Budućnost	1–1	Sarajevo	Podgorica
		Report		Stadium: Stadion pod Goricom; Attendance: 7,000

18 September 1983 7	Sarajevo	6–0	Prishtina	Sarajevo
		Report		Stadium: Koševo City Stadium; Attendance: 5,000

25 September 1983 8	Partizan	2–0	Sarajevo	Belgrade
		Report		Stadium: JNA Stadium; Attendance: 8,000

2 October 1983 9	Sarajevo	0–0	Rijeka	Sarajevo
		Report		Stadium: Koševo City Stadium; Attendance: 5,000

5 October 1983 10	Dinamo Zagreb	4–0	Sarajevo	Zagreb
		Report		Stadium: Stadion Maksimir; Attendance: 8,000

16 October 1983 11	Sarajevo	4–0	Olimpija	Sarajevo
		Report		Stadium: Grbavica Stadium; Attendance: 5,000

23 October 1983 12	Vojvodina	2–0	Sarajevo	Novi Sad
		Report		Stadium: Stadion Vojvodine; Attendance: 5,000

30 October 1983 13	Sarajevo	3–0	Dinamo Vinkovci	Sarajevo
		Report		Stadium: Grbavica Stadium; Attendance: 5,000

6 November 1983 14	Sarajevo	3–0	Čelik	Sarajevo
		Report		Stadium: Grbavica Stadium; Attendance: 10,000

20 November 1983 15	Osijek	1–0	Sarajevo	Osijek
		Report		Stadium: Gradski Vrt Stadium; Attendance: 2,000

27 November 1983 16	Sarajevo	3–0	Vardar	Sarajevo
		Report		Stadium: Grbavica Stadium; Attendance: 2,500

4 December 1983 17	Red Star	1–0	Sarajevo	Belgrade
		Report		Stadium: Marakana Stadium; Attendance: 5,000

26 February 1984 18	Velež	3–0	Sarajevo	Mostar
		Report		Stadium: Stadion pod Bijelim Brijegom; Attendance: 7,000

29 February 1984 19	Sarajevo	3–0	Radnički	Sarajevo
		Report		Stadium: Grbavica Stadium; Attendance: 5,000

4 March 1984 20	Hajduk	1–1	Sarajevo	Split
		Report		Stadium: Stadion Poljud; Attendance: 20,000

11 March 1984 21	Sarajevo	2–0	Sloboda	Sarajevo
		Report		Stadium: Grbavica Stadium; Attendance: 4,500

18 March 1984 22	Željezničar	5–2	Sarajevo	Sarajevo
		Report		Stadium: Grbavica Stadium; Attendance: 23,000

25 March 1984 23	Sarajevo	0–2	Budućnost	Sarajevo
		Report		Stadium: Grbavica Stadium; Attendance: 5,000

28 March 1984 24	Prishtina	4–0	Sarajevo	Pristina
		Report		Stadium: Pristina City Stadium; Attendance: 23,000

8 April 1984 25	Sarajevo	0–1	Partizan	Sarajevo
		Report		Stadium: Grbavica Stadium; Attendance: 20,000

15 April 1984 26	Rijeka	3–1	Sarajevo	Rijeka
		Report		Stadium: Stadion Kantrida; Attendance: 5,000

22 April 1984 27	Sarajevo	1–0	Dinamo Zagreb	Sarajevo
		Report		Stadium: Koševo City Stadium; Attendance: 10,000

29 April 1984 28	Olimpija	1–1	Sarajevo	Ljubljana
		Report		Stadium: Bežigrad Stadium; Attendance: 5,000

6 May 1984 29	Sarajevo	2–0	Vojvodina	Sarajevo
		Report		Stadium: Koševo City Stadium; Attendance: 5,000

13 May 1984 30	Dinamo Vinkovci	1–1	Sarajevo	Vinkovci
		Report		Stadium: Stadion Mladosti; Attendance: 5,000

16 May 1984 31	Čelik	2–2	Sarajevo	Zenica
		Report		Stadium: Bilino Polje Stadium; Attendance: 3,000

20 May 1984 32	Sarajevo	5–0	Osijek	Sarajevo
		Report		Stadium: Koševo City Stadium; Attendance: 2,500

27 May 1984 33	Vardar	4–3	Sarajevo	Skopje
		Report		Stadium: Skopje City Stadium; Attendance: 7,000

30 May 1984 34	Sarajevo	2–2	Red Star	Sarajevo
		Report		Stadium: Koševo City Stadium; Attendance: 30,000

=== Yugoslav Cup ===
==== Round of 32 ====
13 September 1983	OFK Titograd	0–3	Sarajevo	Podgorica
		Report		Stadium: Podgorica City Stadium; Attendance: 3,000

==== Round of 16 ====
16 November 1983	Sarajevo	4–1	Dinamo Vinkovci	Sarajevo
13:00 CET (UTC+1)		Report		Stadium: Grbavica Stadium; Attendance: 1,500

==== Quarter-finals ====
18 April 1984	Sarajevo	0–4	Hajduk	Sarajevo
17:15 CEST (UTC+2)		Report		Stadium: Koševo City Stadium; Attendance: 7,000
