= 1980–81 FK Sarajevo season =

Sarajevo
1980–81 season
- Director general: Svetozar Vujović
- President: Ljubomir Grupković
- Manager: Fuad Muzurović
- Stadium: Koševo City Stadium; Grbavica Stadium
- Yugoslav First League: 13th
- Yugoslav Cup: Round of 32
- UEFA Cup: First round
- Highest home attendance: 45,000 vs Hamburger SV (1 October 1980)
- Lowest home attendance: 2,000 vs Olimpija (12 October 1980); 2,000 vs Zagreb (30 November 1980)
- Average home league attendance: 8,430
- Biggest win: Sarajevo 4–2 OFK Beograd (9 November 1980)
- Biggest defeat: Budućnost 4–1 Sarajevo (19 October 1980)

The 1980–81 Sarajevo season was the club's 34th season in history, and their 32nd season in the top flight of Yugoslav football, the Yugoslav First League. Besides competing in the First League, the team competed in the National Cup and the UEFA Cup.

== Squad information ==
=== First-team squad ===
Note: Flags indicate national team as defined under FIFA eligibility rules; some limited exceptions apply. Players may hold more than one non-FIFA nationality.

No.	Pos.	Nation	Player
—	GK	YUG	Miloš Đurković
—	GK	YUG	Irfan Handžić
—	GK	YUG	Slobodan Janjuš
—	DF	YUG	Dragan Božović
—	DF	YUG	Nijaz Ferhatović (Captain)
—	DF	YUG	Faruk Hadžibegić
—	DF	YUG	Davor Jozić
—	DF	YUG	Mirza Kapetanović
—	DF	YUG	Zoran Lukić
—	DF	YUG	Nihad Milak
—	DF	YUG	Ferid Radeljaš
—	DF	YUG	Ante Rajković
—	DF	YUG	Dragan Tomašević
—	DF	YUG	Nenad Vidaković
—	DF	YUG	Želimir Vidović

No.	Pos.	Nation	Player
—	MF	YUG	Abdel Bešović
—	MF	YUG	Edim Hadžialagić
—	MF	YUG	Mehmed Janjoš
—	MF	YUG	Senad Melić
—	MF	YUG	Nijaz Merdanović
—	MF	YUG	Senad Merdanović
—	MF	YUG	Besim Nikolić
7	MF	YUG	Safet Sušić (Captain)
11	MF	YUG	Predrag Pašić
—	MF	YUG	Slaviša Vukičević
—	FW	YUG	Vahid Avdić
—	FW	YUG	Husref Musemić
—	FW	YUG	Agim Nikolić
—	FW	YUG	Mile Urošević

== Competitions ==
=== Overview ===
Competition	First match	Last match	Starting round	Final position	Record							
Competition	First match	Last match	Starting round	Final position	Pld	W	D	L	GF	GA	GD	Win %
Yugoslav First League	19 August 1980	14 June 1981	Matchday 1	13th	34	12	8	14	47	53	−6	35.29
Yugoslav Cup	15 October 1980		Round of 32	Round of 32	1	0	0	1	1	2	−1	0.00
UEFA Cup	17 September 1980	1 October 1980	First round	First round	2	0	1	1	5	7	−2	0.00
Total					37	12	9	16	53	62	−9	32.43

Source: Competitions

=== Yugoslav First League ===
==== League table ====
Pos	Team	Pld	W	D	L	GF	GA	GD	Pts
11	Vardar	34	11	11	12	41	48	−7	33
12	Olimpija	34	8	16	10	29	33	−4	32
13	Sarajevo	34	12	8	14	47	53	−6	32
14	Željezničar	34	11	10	13	42	51	−9	32
15	OFK Belgrade	34	8	14	12	34	39	−5	30

Source: rsssf.org
Rules for classification: 1) points; 2) goal difference; 3) number of goals scored.

==== Matches ====
19 August 1980 1	Sarajevo	1–1	Radnički	Sarajevo
		Report		Stadium: Koševo City Stadium; Attendance: 7,000

24 August 1980 2	Sloboda	3–2	Sarajevo	Tuzla
		Report		Stadium: Tušanj City Stadium; Attendance: 8,000

31 August 1980 3	Sarajevo	3–0	Borac	Sarajevo
		Report		Stadium: Koševo City Stadium; Attendance: 4,000

7 September 1980 4	Vardar	3–1	Sarajevo	Skopje
		Report		Stadium: Skopje City Stadium; Attendance: 20,000

13 September 1980 5	Sarajevo	1–2	Željezničar	Sarajevo
		Report		Stadium: Koševo City Stadium; Attendance: 25,000

21 September 1980 6	Velež	0–1	Sarajevo	Mostar
		Report		Stadium: Bijeli Brijeg Stadium; Attendance: 10,000

5 October 1980 7	Sarajevo	3–1	Dinamo	Sarajevo
		Report		Stadium: Koševo City Stadium; Attendance: 8,000

9 October 1980 8	Vojvodina	2–0	Sarajevo	Novi Sad
		Report		Stadium: Stadion Vojvodine; Attendance: 2,000

12 October 1980 9	Sarajevo	1–1	Olimpija	Sarajevo
		Report		Stadium: Koševo City Stadium; Attendance: 2,000

19 October 1980 10	Budućnost	4–1	Sarajevo	Podgorica
		Report		Stadium: Podgorica City Stadium; Attendance: 9,000

26 October 1980 11	Sarajevo	4–3	Napredak	Sarajevo
		Report		Stadium: Koševo City Stadium; Attendance: 3,000

29 October 1980 12	Hajduk	3–0	Sarajevo	Split
		Report		Stadium: Poljud Stadium; Attendance: 20,000

1 November 1980 13	Sarajevo	2–2	Red Star	Sarajevo
		Report		Stadium: Koševo City Stadium; Attendance: 15,000

9 November 1980 14	Sarajevo	4–2	OFK Beograd	Sarajevo
		Report		Stadium: Koševo City Stadium; Attendance: 2,310

22 November 1980 15	Partizan	1–1	Sarajevo	Belgrade
		Report		Stadium: JNA Stadium; Attendance: 25,000

30 November 1980 16	Sarajevo	3–0	Zagreb	Sarajevo
		Report		Stadium: Koševo City Stadium; Attendance: 2,000

7 December 1980 17	Rijeka	2–0	Sarajevo	Rijeka
		Report		Stadium: Stadion Kantrida; Attendance: 2,500

28 February 1981 18	Radnički	2–1	Sarajevo	Niš
		Report		Stadium: Čair Stadium; Attendance: 1,500

7 March 1981 19	Sarajevo	2–1	Sloboda	Sarajevo
		Report		Stadium: Grbavica Stadium; Attendance: 4,000

15 March 1981 20	Borac	0–0	Sarajevo	Banja Luka
		Report		Stadium: Banja Luka City Stadium; Attendance: 7,000

22 March 1981 21	Sarajevo	3–0	Vardar	Sarajevo
		Report		Stadium: Grbavica Stadium; Attendance: 8,000

29 March 1981 22	Željezničar	2–2	Sarajevo	Sarajevo
		Report		Stadium: Grbavica Stadium; Attendance: 25,000

5 April 1981 23	Sarajevo	0–2	Velež	Sarajevo
		Report		Stadium: Grbavica Stadium; Attendance: 15,000

12 April 1981 24	Dinamo	3–0	Sarajevo	Zagreb
		Report		Stadium: Maksimir Stadium; Attendance: 20,000

15 April 1981 25	Sarajevo	2–0	Vojvodina	Sarajevo
		Report		Stadium: Grbavica Stadium; Attendance: 6,000

19 April 1981 26	Olimpija	0–1	Sarajevo	Ljubljana
		Report		Stadium: Bežigrad Stadium; Attendance: 8,000

3 May 1981 27	Sarajevo	2–1	Budućnost	Sarajevo
		Report		Stadium: Grbavica Stadium; Attendance: 5,000

9 May 1981 28	Napredak	1–0	Sarajevo	Kruševac
		Report		Stadium: Mladost Stadium; Attendance: 5,000

17 May 1981 29	Sarajevo	1–1	Hajduk	Sarajevo
		Report		Stadium: Grbavica Stadium; Attendance: 16,000

27 May 1981 30	Red Star	3–1	Sarajevo	Belgrade
		Report		Stadium: Marakana Stadium; Attendance: 10,000

30 May 1981 31	OFK Beograd	2–0	Sarajevo	Belgrade
		Report		Stadium: Karaburma Stadium; Attendance: 2,000

7 June 1981 32	Sarajevo	1–1	Partizan	Sarajevo
		Report		Stadium: Grbavica Stadium; Attendance: 15,000

10 June 1981 33	Zagreb	3–1	Sarajevo	Zagreb
		Report		Stadium: Stadion Kranjčevićeva; Attendance: 6,000

14 June 1981 34	Sarajevo	2–1	Rijeka	Sarajevo
		Report		Stadium: Grbavica Stadium; Attendance: 6,000

=== Yugoslav Cup ===
==== Round of 32 ====
15 October 1980	Napredak Kruševac	2–1	Sarajevo	Kruševac
14:30 CEST (UTC+2)		Report		Stadium: Mladost Stadium; Attendance: 5,000

=== UEFA Cup ===
==== First round ====
17 September 1980 First leg	Hamburger SV (West Germany)	4–2	(Socialist Federal Republic of Yugoslavia) Sarajevo	Hamburg, West Germany
19:00 CEST (UTC+2)	Magath (yellow card) 26'; Kaltz 33' (pen.); Hrubesch 43', 45'; Hartwig (yellow card) 81', (goal) 89'; Jakobs (yellow card) 85'	Report	Radeljaš (yellow card) 2' (yellow-red card) 39'; Ferhatović (yellow card) 5'; Hadžibegić (yellow card) 6' (yellow-red card) 80'; Sušić 18', 74', (yellow card) 32'; Kapetanović (yellow card) 30'; Milak (yellow card) 68' (yellow-red card) 89'	Stadium: Volksparkstadion; Attendance: 18,000; Referee: Clive Thomas (Wales)

1 October 1980 Second leg	Sarajevo (Socialist Federal Republic of Yugoslavia)	3–3 (5–7 agg.)	(West Germany) Hamburger SV	Sarajevo, Yugoslavia
17:00 CEST (UTC+2)	Lukić 23'; Pašić 36', 80'; Božović (yellow card) 72'	Report	Hrubesch 26', 58', 88', (yellow card) 27'; Reimann (yellow card) 50'	Stadium: Koševo City Stadium; Attendance: 45,000; Referee: Paolo Casarin (Italy)
