= 1982–83 FK Sarajevo season =

Sarajevo
1982–83 season
- Director general: Svetozar Vujović
- President: Duško Cvijetić
- Manager: Srboljub Markušević; Mirsad Fazlagić; Boško Antić
- Stadium: Koševo City Stadium
- Yugoslav First League: 11th
- Yugoslav Cup: Runners-up
- UEFA Cup: Third round
- Top goalscorer: League: Safet Sušić 9 All: Husref Musemić 15
- Highest home attendance: 35,000 vs Slavia Sofia (29 September 1982)
- Lowest home attendance: 2,000 vs Rabotnički (10 November 1982); 2,000 vs Sloboda (10 April 1983)
- Average home league attendance: 10,000
- Biggest win: Red Star 1–4 Sarajevo (15 August 1982); Sarajevo 4–1 Dinamo Vinkovci (30 October 1982)
- Biggest defeat: Rijeka 3–0 Sarajevo (13 April 1983)

The 1982–83 Sarajevo season was the club's 36th season in history, and their 34th season in the top flight of Yugoslav football, the Yugoslav First League. Besides competing in the First League, the team competed in the National Cup and the UEFA Cup.

== Squad information ==
=== First-team squad ===
Note: Flags indicate national team as defined under FIFA eligibility rules; some limited exceptions apply. Players may hold more than one non-FIFA nationality.

No.	Pos.	Nation	Player
—	GK	YUG	Miloš Đurković
1	GK	YUG	Slobodan Janjuš
—	GK	YUG	Dragoslav Vukadin
—	DF	YUG	Dragan Božović
—	DF	YUG	Nijaz Ferhatović
6	DF	YUG	Faruk Hadžibegić
—	DF	YUG	Davor Jozić
3	DF	YUG	Mirza Kapetanović
—	DF	YUG	Zoran Lukić
—	DF	YUG	Nihad Milak
—	DF	YUG	Ferid Radeljaš
4	DF	YUG	Želimir Vidović
—	MF	YUG	Boban Božović

No.	Pos.	Nation	Player
—	MF	YUG	Edim Hadžialagić
—	MF	YUG	Mehmed Janjoš
—	MF	YUG	Senad Merdanović
—	MF	YUG	Predrag Pašić
—	MF	YUG	Haris Smajić
7	MF	YUG	Safet Sušić (Captain)
—	MF	YUG	Ivica Vujičević
—	MF	YUG	Slaviša Vukičević
—	FW	YUG	Ismet Bajrić
—	FW	YUG	Husref Musemić
—	FW	YUG	Muhidin Teskeredžić
—	FW	YUG	Dinko Vrabac

== Kit ==
Sponsors
UNIS
Pobjeda Tešanj

== Competitions ==
=== Overview ===
Competition	First match	Last match	Starting round	Final position	Record							
Competition	First match	Last match	Starting round	Final position	Pld	W	D	L	GF	GA	GD	Win %
First League	15 August 1982	26 June 1983	Matchday 1	11th	34	10	12	12	45	44	+1	29.41
Yugoslav Cup	27 October 1982	24 May 1983	Round of 32	Runners-up	5	3	1	1	11	5	+6	60.00
UEFA Cup	14 September 1982	8 December 1982	First round	Third round	6	3	2	1	16	14	+2	50.00
Total					45	16	15	14	72	63	+9	35.56

Source: Competitions

=== Yugoslav First League ===
==== League table ====
Pos	Team	Pld	W	D	L	GF	GA	GD	Pts
9	Vojvodina	34	12	10	12	38	60	−22	34
10	Željezničar	34	11	11	12	41	40	+1	33
11	Sarajevo	34	10	12	12	45	44	+1	32
12	Dinamo Vinkovci	34	12	7	15	56	59	−3	31
13	Velež	34	11	9	14	54	57	−3	31

Source: rsssf.org
Rules for classification: 1) points; 2) goal difference; 3) number of goals scored.

==== Matches ====
15 August 1982 1	Red Star	1–4	Sarajevo	Belgrade
		Report		Stadium: Marakana Stadium; Attendance: 15,000

22 August 1982 2	Sarajevo	3–1	Partizan	Sarajevo
		Report		Stadium: Koševo City Stadium; Attendance: 25,000

29 August 1982 3	Hajduk	1–1	Sarajevo	Split
		Report		Stadium: Poljud Stadium; Attendance: 30,000

2 September 1982 4	Sarajevo	4–2	Velež	Sarajevo
		Report		Stadium: Koševo City Stadium; Attendance: 6,000

5 September 1982 5	Osijek	1–0	Sarajevo	Osijek
		Report		Stadium: Gradski Vrt Stadium; Attendance: 10,000

10 September 1982 6	Sloboda	2–1	Sarajevo	Tuzla
		Report		Stadium: Tušanj City Stadium; Attendance: 3,000

19 September 1982 7	Sarajevo	2–1	Rijeka	Sarajevo
		Report		Stadium: Koševo City Stadium; Attendance: 15,000

24 September 1982 8	Vardar	1–1	Sarajevo	Skopje
		Report		Stadium: Skopje City Stadium; Attendance: 10,000

3 October 1982 9	Sarajevo	0–0	Vojvodina	Sarajevo
		Report		Stadium: Koševo City Stadium; Attendance: 6,000

6 October 1982 10	Galenika	3–1	Sarajevo	Zemun
		Report		Stadium: Zemun Stadium; Attendance: 5,000

17 October 1982 11	Sarajevo	1–1	OFK Beograd	Sarajevo
		Report		Stadium: Koševo City Stadium; Attendance: 6,000

23 October 1982 12	Radnički Niš	2–1	Sarajevo	Niš
		Report		Stadium: Čair Stadium; Attendance: 3,000

30 October 1982 13	Sarajevo	4–1	Dinamo Vinkovci	Sarajevo
		Report		Stadium: Koševo City Stadium; Attendance: 4,000

7 November 1982 14	Željezničar	1–0	Sarajevo	Sarajevo
		Report		Stadium: Grbavica Stadium; Attendance: 20,000

20 November 1982 15	Sarajevo	2–0	Olimpija	Sarajevo
		Report		Stadium: Koševo City Stadium; Attendance: 5,000

29 November 1982 16	Dinamo Zagreb	2–2	Sarajevo	Zagreb
		Report		Stadium: Maksimir Stadium; Attendance: 5,000

4 December 1982 17	Sarajevo	2–0	Budućnost	Sarajevo
		Report		Stadium: Koševo City Stadium; Attendance: 5,000

6 March 1983 18	Sarajevo	1–1	Red Star	Sarajevo
		Report		Stadium: Koševo City Stadium; Attendance: 25,000

12 March 1983 19	Partizan	0–1	Sarajevo	Belgrade
		Report		Stadium: JNA Stadium; Attendance: 20,000

20 March 1983 20	Sarajevo	1–3	Hajduk	Sarajevo
		Report		Stadium: Koševo City Stadium; Attendance: 20,000

26 March 1983 21	Velež	1–1	Sarajevo	Mostar
		Report		Stadium: Bijeli Brijeg Stadium; Attendance: 800

3 April 1983 22	Sarajevo	1–1	Osijek	Sarajevo
		Report		Stadium: Koševo City Stadium; Attendance: 7,000

10 April 1983 23	Sarajevo	1–1	Sloboda	Sarajevo
		Report		Stadium: Koševo City Stadium; Attendance: 2,000

13 April 1983 24	Rijeka	3–0	Sarajevo	Rijeka
		Report		Stadium: Kantrida Stadium; Attendance: 3,000

17 April 1983 25	Sarajevo	2–1	Vardar	Sarajevo
		Report		Stadium: Koševo City Stadium; Attendance: 5,000

1 May 1983 26	Vojvodina	2–1	Sarajevo	Novi Sad
		Report		Stadium: Stadion Vojvodine; Attendance: 3,000

8 May 1983 27	Sarajevo	2–0	Galenika	Sarajevo
		Report		Stadium: Koševo City Stadium; Attendance: 4,000

14 May 1983 28	OFK Beograd	2–0	Sarajevo	Belgrade
		Report		Stadium: Karaburma Stadium; Attendance: 1,500

21 May 1983 29	Sarajevo	1–2	Radnički Niš	Sarajevo
		Report		Stadium: Koševo City Stadium; Attendance: 3,000

29 May 1983 30	Dinamo Vinkovci	2–0	Sarajevo	Vinkovci
		Report		Stadium: Stadion Mladosti; Attendance: 5,000

5 June 1983 31	Sarajevo	0–0	Željezničar	Sarajevo
		Report		Stadium: Koševo City Stadium; Attendance: 20,000

12 June 1983 32	Olimpija	1–0	Sarajevo	Ljubljana
		Report		Stadium: Bežigrad Stadium; Attendance: 5,000

19 June 1983 33	Sarajevo	1–1	Dinamo Zagreb	Sarajevo
		Report		Stadium: Koševo City Stadium; Attendance: 12,000

26 June 1983 34	Budućnost	3–3	Sarajevo	Podgorica
		Report		Stadium: Podgorica City Stadium; Attendance: 3,000

=== Yugoslav Cup ===
==== Round of 32 ====
27 October 1982	Rudar Kakanj	0–3	Sarajevo	Kakanj
		Report		Stadium: Pod Vardom Stadium; Attendance: 4,000

==== Round of 16 ====
10 November 1982	Sarajevo	5–2	Rabotnički	Sarajevo
12:00 CET (UTC+1)		Report		Stadium: Koševo City Stadium; Attendance: 2,000

==== Quarter-finals ====
6 April 1983	Orijent	0–0 (3–4 p)	Sarajevo	Rijeka
16:00 CEST (UTC+2)		Report		Stadium: Stadion Krimeja; Attendance: 4,000

==== Semi-finals ====
27 April 1983	Sarajevo	1–0	Hajduk Split	Sarajevo
16:30 CEST (UTC+2)		Report		Stadium: Koševo City Stadium; Attendance: 25,000

==== Final ====
24 May 1983	Sarajevo	2–3	Dinamo Zagreb	Belgrade
16:30 CEST (UTC+2)		Report		Stadium: Marakana Stadium; Attendance: 35,000

=== UEFA Cup ===
==== First round ====
14 September 1982 First leg	Slavia Sofia (Bulgaria)	2–2	(Socialist Federal Republic of Yugoslavia) Sarajevo	Sofia, Bulgaria
18:30 EEST (UTC+3)	Radkov 17', 89'	Report	Pašić 22', 85'	Stadium: Ovcha Kupel Stadium; Attendance: 10,000; Referee: Ruedi Renggli (Switzerland)

29 September 1982 Second leg	Sarajevo (Socialist Federal Republic of Yugoslavia)	4–2 (6–4 agg.)	(Bulgaria) Slavia Sofia	Sarajevo, Yugoslavia
15:30 CEST (UTC+2)	Musemić 11', 27', 85'; Sušić 89'	Report	Velichkov 40', 45'	Stadium: Koševo City Stadium; Attendance: 35,000; Referee: John Hunting (England)

==== Second round ====
20 October 1982 First leg	Corvinul Hunedoara (Romania)	4–4	(Socialist Federal Republic of Yugoslavia) Sarajevo	Hunedoara, Romania
15:00 EEST (UTC+3)	Dumitrache 37'; Andone 41'; Petcu 44'; Mateuț 54'	Report	Hadžialagić 7'; Lukić 17', 83'; Pašić 80'	Stadium: Stadionul Corvinul; Attendance: 18,000; Referee: Romualdas Yushka (Soviet Union)

3 November 1982 Second leg	Sarajevo (Socialist Federal Republic of Yugoslavia)	4–0 (8–4 agg.)	(Romania) Corvinul Hunedoara	Sarajevo, Yugoslavia
14:30 CET (UTC+1)	Musemić 33'; Jozić 60'; Sušić 69'; Pašić 78'	Report		Stadium: Koševo City Stadium; Attendance: 25,000; Referee: Gianfranco Menegali (Italy)

==== Third round ====
24 November 1982 First leg	Anderlecht (Belgium)	6–1	(Socialist Federal Republic of Yugoslavia) Sarajevo	Brussels, Belgium
20:00 CET (UTC+1)	Lozano 5', 25'; Vandenbergh 32', 38'; Ferhatović 43' (o.g.); Vercauteren 62'	Report	Sušić 41'	Stadium: Stade Emile Versé; Attendance: 35,000; Referee: Erik Fredriksson (Sweden)

8 December 1982 Second leg	Sarajevo (Socialist Federal Republic of Yugoslavia)	1–0 (2–6 agg.)	(Belgium) Anderlecht	Sarajevo, Yugoslavia
16:00 CET (UTC+1)	Musemić 39'	Report		Stadium: Koševo City Stadium; Attendance: 25,000; Referee: Emilio Carlos Guruceta (Spain)
