= 1984–85 FK Sarajevo season =

Sarajevo
1984–85 season
- director: Svetozar Vujović
- President: Mile Markić
- Manager: Boško Antić
- Stadium: Koševo City Stadium
- Yugoslav First League: Winners
- Yugoslav Cup: Round of 32
- Top goalscorer: League: Husref Musemić (19); All: Husref Musemić (19)
- Highest home attendance: 40,000 vs Red Star (30 June 1985)
- Lowest home attendance: 3,000 (3 games)
- Average home league attendance: 11,647
- Biggest win: Radnički 0–4 Sarajevo (11 November 1984)
- Biggest defeat: Pelister 4–1 Sarajevo (29 August 1984); Red Star 4–1 Sarajevo (9 December 1984)

The 1984–85 Sarajevo season was the club's 38th season in history, and their 36th season in the top flight of Yugoslav football, the Yugoslav First League. Besides competing in the First League, the team competed in the National Cup. In this season Sarajevo became the Yugoslav champion for the second time in the history of the club.

== Squad information ==
=== First-team squad ===
Note: Flags indicate national team as defined under FIFA eligibility rules; some limited exceptions apply. Players may hold more than one non-FIFA nationality.

No.	Pos.	Nation	Player
1	GK	YUG	Miloš Đurković
2	DF	YUG	Ferid Radeljaš
3	DF	YUG	Mirza Kapetanović
4	MF	YUG	Mehmed Janjoš
5	DF	YUG	Davor Jozić
5	DF	YUG	Nihad Milak
6	DF	YUG	Faruk Hadžibegić
7	FW	YUG	Dragan Jakovljević
8	MF	YUG	Slaviša Vukičević
9	FW	YUG	Husref Musemić
10	MF	YUG	Senad Merdanović
11	FW	YUG	Predrag Pašić (Captain)

No.	Pos.	Nation	Player
15	DF	YUG	Edim Hadžialagić
—	DF	YUG	Dejan Raičković
—	DF	YUG	Goran Jurišić
—	DF	YUG	Esad Hošić
—	FW	YUG	Ivica Vujičević
—	FW	YUG	Zijad Švrakić
—	GK	YUG	Irfan Handžić
—	MF	YUG	Vladimir Petković
—	MF	YUG	Agim Nikolić
—	MF	YUG	Dragan Božović
—	MF	YUG	Tomislav Bošnjak

== Kit ==
Supplier	Sponsors
(England) Admiral Sportswear	(Socialist Federal Republic of Yugoslavia) ALHOS, Energoinvest

== Competitions ==
=== Overview ===
Competition	First match	Last match	Starting round	Final position	Record							
Competition	First match	Last match	Starting round	Final position	Pld	W	D	L	GF	GA	GD	Win %
First League	19 August 1984	30 June 1985	Matchday 1	Winners	34	19	10	5	51	30	+21	55.88
Yugoslav Cup	29 August 1984		Round of 32	Round of 32	1	0	0	1	1	4	−3	0.00
Total					35	19	10	6	52	34	+18	54.29

Last updated: complete
Source: Competitions

=== Yugoslav First League ===
==== League table ====
Pos	Team	Pld	W	D	L	GF	GA	GD	Pts	Qualification or relegation
1	Sarajevo (C)	34	19	10	5	51	30	+21	48	Qualification for European Cup first round
2	Hajduk Split	34	16	12	6	65	42	+23	44	Qualification for UEFA Cup first round
3	Partizan	34	14	11	9	46	34	+12	39	Qualification for UEFA Cup first round
4	Red Star Belgrade	34	16	6	12	63	38	+25	38	Qualification for Cup Winners' Cup first round
5	Vardar	34	16	5	13	67	58	+9	37	Qualification for UEFA Cup first round

Source: rsssf.org
Rules for classification: 1) points; 2) goal difference; 3) number of goals scored.
(C) Champions

==== Matches ====
19 August 1984 1	Sarajevo	2–0	Sutjeska	Sarajevo
		Report		Stadium: Koševo City Stadium; Attendance: 6,000

26 August 1984 2	Rijeka	2–0	Sarajevo	Rijeka
		Report		Stadium: Stadion Kantrida; Attendance: 6,000

2 September 1984 3	Sarajevo	3–0	Dinamo Vinkovci	Sarajevo
		Report		Stadium: Koševo City Stadium; Attendance: 5,000

5 September 1984 4	Sloboda	0–0	Sarajevo	Tuzla
		Report		Stadium: Tušanj City Stadium; Attendance: 10,000

9 September 1984 5	Sarajevo	0–0	Željezničar	Sarajevo
		Report		Stadium: Koševo City Stadium; Attendance: 35,000

16 September 1984 6	Dinamo Zagreb	1–2	Sarajevo	Zagreb
		Report		Stadium: Stadion Maksimir; Attendance: 10,000

23 September 1984 7	Sarajevo	1–0	Hajduk	Sarajevo
		Report		Stadium: Koševo City Stadium; Attendance: 15,000

7 October 1984 8	Partizan	1–0	Sarajevo	Belgrade
		Report		Stadium: Stadion JNA; Attendance: 15,000

28 October 1984 9	Sarajevo	0–0	Budućnost	Sarajevo
		Report		Stadium: Koševo City Stadium; Attendance: 3,000

31 October 1984 10	Prishtina	0–2	Sarajevo	Pristina
		Report		Stadium: Pristina City Stadium; Attendance: 20,000

4 November 1984 11	Sarajevo	2–1	Osijek	Sarajevo
		Report		Stadium: Koševo City Stadium; Attendance: 4,000

11 November 1984 12	Radnički	0–4	Sarajevo	Niš
		Report		Stadium: Čair Stadium; Attendance: 5,000

18 November 1984 13	Sarajevo	1–0	Vojvodina	Sarajevo
		Report		Stadium: Koševo City Stadium; Attendance: 8,000

21 November 1984 14	Sarajevo	1–0	Velež	Sarajevo
		Report		Stadium: Koševo City Stadium; Attendance: 12,000

25 November 1984 15	Iskra	1–3	Sarajevo	Bugojno
		Report		Stadium: Stadion Jaklić; Attendance: 10,000

2 December 1984 16	Sarajevo	3–2	Vardar	Sarajevo
		Report		Stadium: Koševo City Stadium; Attendance: 9,000

9 December 1984 17	Red Star	4–1	Sarajevo	Belgrade
		Report		Stadium: Red Star; Attendance: 22,000

17 February 1985 18	Sutjeska	2–0	Sarajevo	Nikšić
		Report		Stadium: Gradski stadion (Nikšić); Attendance: 5,000

24 February 1985 19	Sarajevo	1–0	Rijeka	Sarajevo
		Report		Stadium: Koševo City Stadium; Attendance: 3,000

3 March 1985 20	Dinamo Vinkovci	3–0	Sarajevo	Vinkovci
		Report		Stadium: Stadion Mladosti; Attendance: 5,000

10 March 1985 21	Sarajevo	1–0	Sloboda	Sarajevo
		Report		Stadium: Koševo City Stadium; Attendance: 3,000

17 March 1985 22	Željezničar	2–2	Sarajevo	Sarajevo
		Report		Stadium: Stadion Grbavica; Attendance: 25,000

7 April 1985 23	Sarajevo	0–0	Dinamo Zagreb	Sarajevo
		Report		Stadium: Koševo City Stadium; Attendance: 20,000

14 April 1985 24	Hajduk	0–0	Sarajevo	Split
		Report		Stadium: Stadion Poljud; Attendance: 25,000

17 April 1985 25	Sarajevo	3–1	Partizan	Sarajevo
		Report		Stadium: Koševo City Stadium; Attendance: 12,000

21 April 1985 26	Budućnost	0–0	Sarajevo	Titograd
		Report		Stadium: Stadion Pod Goricom; Attendance: 8,000

5 May 1985 27	Sarajevo	2–0	Prishtina	Sarajevo
		Report		Stadium: Koševo City Stadium; Attendance: 5,000

12 May 1985 28	Osijek	2–2	Sarajevo	Osijek
		Report		Stadium: Gradski Vrt Stadium; Attendance: 7,000

19 May 1985 29	Sarajevo	4–2	Radnički	Sarajevo
		Report		Stadium: Koševo City Stadium; Attendance: 10,000

9 June 1985 30	Vojvodina	1–2	Sarajevo	Novi Sad
		Report		Stadium: Stadion Vojvodine; Attendance: 5,000

12 June 1985 31	Velež	2–2	Sarajevo	Mostar
		Report		Stadium: Stadion pod Bijelim Brijegom; Attendance: 12,000

16 June 1985 32	Sarajevo	3–0	Iskra	Sarajevo
		Report		Stadium: Koševo City Stadium; Attendance: 8,000

23 June 1985 33	Vardar	2–2	Sarajevo	Skopje
		Report		Stadium: Gradski stadion Skopje; Attendance: 20,000

30 June 1985 34	Sarajevo	2–1	Red Star	Sarajevo
		Report		Stadium: Koševo City Stadium; Attendance: 40,000

=== Yugoslav Cup ===
==== Round of 32 ====
29 August 1984	Pelister	4–1	Sarajevo	Bitola
		Report		Stadium: Stadion Tumbe Kafe; Attendance: 12,000

== Statistics ==
Appearances

Rank	Player	Games
1	Miloš Đurković	35
2	Faruk Hadžibegić	35
3	Predrag Pašić	34
4	Slaviša Vukićević	34

Goalscorers

Rank	Player	Goals
1	Husref Musemić	19
2	Dragan Jakovljević	10
3	Predrag Pašić	9
4	Faruk Hadžibegić	4

== Winning squad ==

Champions 1984–85 Yugoslav First League - FK Sarajevo winning squad

Champions: FK Sarajevo
Player	League	
Player	Matches	Goals
(Socialist Federal Republic of Yugoslavia) Faruk Hadžibegić	34	4
(Socialist Federal Republic of Yugoslavia) Miloš Đurković	34	0
(Socialist Federal Republic of Yugoslavia) Predrag Pašić	33	9
(Socialist Federal Republic of Yugoslavia) Slaviša Vukićević	33	3
(Socialist Federal Republic of Yugoslavia) Mehmed Janjoš	32	1
(Socialist Federal Republic of Yugoslavia) Ferid Radeljaš	32	0
(Socialist Federal Republic of Yugoslavia) Husref Musemić	31	19
(Socialist Federal Republic of Yugoslavia) Dragan Jakovljević	30	9
(Socialist Federal Republic of Yugoslavia) Mirza Kapetanović	30	0
(Socialist Federal Republic of Yugoslavia) Davor Jozić	29	2
(Socialist Federal Republic of Yugoslavia) Senad Merdanović	23	3
(Socialist Federal Republic of Yugoslavia) Nihad Milak	17	0
(Socialist Federal Republic of Yugoslavia) Zijad Švrakić	16	0
(Socialist Federal Republic of Yugoslavia) Edin Hadžialagić	13	1
(Socialist Federal Republic of Yugoslavia) Goran Jurišić	10	0
(Socialist Federal Republic of Yugoslavia) Ivica Vujičević	8	0
(Socialist Federal Republic of Yugoslavia) Tomislav Bošnjak	5	0
(Socialist Federal Republic of Yugoslavia) Dragan Božović	5	0
(Socialist Federal Republic of Yugoslavia) Vladimir Petković	2	0
(Socialist Federal Republic of Yugoslavia) Dejan Raičković	2	0
(Socialist Federal Republic of Yugoslavia) Esad Hošić	1	0
(Socialist Federal Republic of Yugoslavia) Agim Nikolić	1	0
Head coach: (Socialist Federal Republic of Yugoslavia) Boško Antić
