= 1979–80 FK Sarajevo season =

Sarajevo
1979–80 season
- Director general: Svetozar Vujović
- President: Ljubomir Grupković
- Manager: Fuad Muzurović
- Stadium: Koševo City Stadium
- Yugoslav First League: 2nd
- Yugoslav Cup: Semi-finals
- Highest home attendance: 40,000 vs Velež (9 September 1979); 40,000 vs Red Star (9 April 1980)
- Lowest home attendance: 3,000 three games
- Average home league attendance: 11,412
- Biggest win: Sarajevo 6–0 Olimpija (1 June 1980)
- Biggest defeat: Red Star 4–1 Sarajevo (15 June 1980)

The 1979–80 Sarajevo season was the club's 33rd season in history, and their 31st season in the top flight of Yugoslav football, the Yugoslav First League. Besides competing in the First League, the team competed in the National Cup.

== Squad information ==
=== First-team squad ===
Note: Flags indicate national team as defined under FIFA eligibility rules; some limited exceptions apply. Players may hold more than one non-FIFA nationality.

No.	Pos.	Nation	Player
—	GK	YUG	Irfan Handžić
—	GK	YUG	Slobodan Janjuš
5	DF	YUG	Nijaz Ferhatović
6	DF	YUG	Faruk Hadžibegić
—	DF	YUG	Davor Jozić
—	DF	YUG	Mirza Kapetanović
3	DF	YUG	Zoran Lukić
—	DF	YUG	Nihad Milak
—	DF	YUG	Ferid Radeljaš
—	DF	YUG	Ante Rajković
—	DF	YUG	Nenad Vidaković
2	DF	YUG	Želimir Vidović
—	MF	YUG	Abdel Bešović

No.	Pos.	Nation	Player
—	MF	YUG	Dušan Đurić
—	MF	YUG	Sead Hodžić
—	MF	YUG	Mehmed Janjoš
—	MF	YUG	Nijaz Merdanović
—	MF	YUG	Senad Merdanović
—	MF	YUG	Besim Nikolić
—	MF	YUG	Predrag Pašić
—	MF	YUG	Haris Smajić
7	MF	YUG	Safet Sušić (Captain)
—	FW	YUG	Vahid Avdić
—	FW	YUG	Husref Musemić
—	FW	YUG	Agim Nikolić

== Competitions ==
=== Overview ===
Competition	First match	Last match	Starting round	Final position	Record							
Competition	First match	Last match	Starting round	Final position	Pld	W	D	L	GF	GA	GD	Win %
Yugoslav First League	15 July 1979	28 June 1980	Matchday 1	2nd	34	17	7	10	55	41	+14	50.00
Yugoslav Cup	17 October 1979	9 April 1980	Round of 32	Semi-finals	4	2	2	0	7	3	+4	50.00
Total					38	19	9	10	62	44	+18	50.00

Source: Competitions

=== Yugoslav First League ===
==== League table ====
Pos	Team	Pld	W	D	L	GF	GA	GD	Pts	Qualification or relegation
1	Red Star Belgrade (C)	34	19	10	5	54	26	+28	48	Qualification for European Cup first round
2	Sarajevo	34	17	7	10	55	41	+14	41	Qualification for UEFA Cup first round
3	Radnički Niš	34	14	11	9	49	32	+17	39	Qualification for UEFA Cup first round
4	Napredak Kruševac	34	13	13	8	41	27	+14	39	Qualification for UEFA Cup first round
5	Hajduk Split	34	15	8	11	53	44	+9	38	

Source: rsssf.org
Rules for classification: 1) points; 2) goal difference; 3) number of goals scored.
(C) Champions

==== Matches ====
15 July 1979 1	Radnički	1–0	Sarajevo	Niš
		Report		Stadium: Čair Stadium; Attendance: 6,000

22 July 1979 2	Sarajevo	3–0	Vardar	Sarajevo
		Report		Stadium: Koševo City Stadium; Attendance: 7,000

29 July 1979 3	Čelik	0–1	Sarajevo	Zenica
		Report		Stadium: Bilino Polje Stadium; Attendance: 13,000

1 August 1979 4	Sarajevo	0–1	Napredak	Sarajevo
		Report		Stadium: Koševo City Stadium; Attendance: 9,000

4 August 1979 5	Rijeka	1–1	Sarajevo	Rijeka
		Report		Stadium: Kantrida Stadium; Attendance: 2,000

12 August 1979 6	Budućnost	0–2	Sarajevo	Podgorica
		Report		Stadium: Podgorica City Stadium; Attendance: 6,000

18 August 1979 7	Sarajevo	2–2	Partizan	Sarajevo
		Report		Stadium: Koševo City Stadium; Attendance: 7,000

26 August 1979 8	Osijek	2–3	Sarajevo	Osijek
		Report		Stadium: Gradski Vrt Stadium; Attendance: 10,000

2 September 1979 9	Sarajevo	2–1	Sloboda	Sarajevo
		Report		Stadium: Koševo City Stadium; Attendance: 10,000

5 September 1979 10	Borac	0–2	Sarajevo	Banja Luka
		Report		Stadium: Banja Luka City Stadium; Attendance: 10,000

9 September 1979 11	Sarajevo	1–0	Velež	Sarajevo
		Report		Stadium: Koševo City Stadium; Attendance: 40,000

7 October 1979 12	Olimpija	2–1	Sarajevo	Ljubljana
		Report		Stadium: Bežigrad Stadium; Attendance: 10,000

14 October 1979 13	Sarajevo	1–0	Vojvodina	Sarajevo
		Report		Stadium: Koševo City Stadium; Attendance: 8,000

21 October 1979 14	Željezničar	1–1	Sarajevo	Sarajevo
		Report		Stadium: Grbavica Stadium; Attendance: 25,000

3 November 1979 15	Sarajevo	2–1	Red Star	Sarajevo
		Report		Stadium: Koševo City Stadium; Attendance: 25,000

18 November 1979 16	Hajduk	1–0	Sarajevo	Split
		Report		Stadium: Poljud Stadium; Attendance: 24,000

25 November 1979 17	Sarajevo	4–2	Dinamo	Sarajevo
		Report		Stadium: Koševo City Stadium; Attendance: 12,000

2 March 1980 18	Sarajevo	2–0	Radnički	Sarajevo
		Report		Stadium: Koševo City Stadium; Attendance: 15,000

9 March 1980 19	Vardar	0–0	Sarajevo	Skopje
		Report		Stadium: Skopje City Stadium; Attendance: 16,000

12 March 1980 20	Sarajevo	2–2	Čelik	Sarajevo
		Report		Stadium: Koševo City Stadium; Attendance: 6,000

16 March 1980 21	Napredak	2–0	Sarajevo	Kruševac
		Report		Stadium: Mladost Stadium; Attendance: 10,000

6 April 1980 22	Sarajevo	2–0	Rijeka	Sarajevo
		Report		Stadium: Koševo City Stadium; Attendance: 4,000

12 April 1980 23	Sarajevo	2–2	Budućnost	Sarajevo
		Report		Stadium: Koševo City Stadium; Attendance: 3,000

20 April 1980 24	Partizan	2–0	Sarajevo	Belgrade
		Report		Stadium: JNA Stadium; Attendance: 18,000

11 May 1980 27	Sarajevo	1–0	Borac	Sarajevo
		Report		Stadium: Koševo City Stadium; Attendance: 3,000

18 May 1980 26	Sloboda	4–2	Sarajevo	Tuzla
		Report		Stadium: Tušanj City Stadium; Attendance: 5,000

21 May 1980 25	Sarajevo	2–1	Osijek	Sarajevo
		Report		Stadium: Koševo City Stadium; Attendance: 5,000

25 May 1980 28	Velež	1–2	Sarajevo	Mostar
		Report		Stadium: Bijeli Brijeg Stadium; Attendance: 4,000

1 June 1980 29	Sarajevo	6–0	Olimpija	Sarajevo
		Report		Stadium: Koševo City Stadium; Attendance: 3,000

4 June 1980 30	Vojvodina	1–0	Sarajevo	Novi Sad
		Report		Stadium: Stadion Vojvodine; Attendance: 12,000

8 June 1980 31	Sarajevo	1–3	Željezničar	Sarajevo
		Report		Stadium: Koševo City Stadium; Attendance: 25,000

15 June 1980 32	Red Star	4–1	Sarajevo	Belgrade
		Report		Stadium: Marakana Stadium; Attendance: 30,000

22 June 1980 33	Sarajevo	4–2	Hajduk	Sarajevo
		Report		Stadium: Koševo City Stadium; Attendance: 12,000

28 June 1980 34	Dinamo	2–2	Sarajevo	Zagreb
		Report		Stadium: Maksimir Stadium; Attendance: 15,000

=== Yugoslav Cup ===
==== Round of 32 ====
17 October 1979	Sarajevo	1–1 (3–1 p)	Rijeka	Sarajevo
16:30 CET (UTC+1)		Report		Stadium: Koševo City Stadium; Attendance: 4,000

==== Round of 16 ====
30 November 1979	Radnički	2–3	Sarajevo	Kragujevac
13:00 CET (UTC+1)		Report		Stadium: Šumarice Stadium; Attendance: 4,500

==== Quarter-finals ====
5 March 1980	Sarajevo	3–0	Sloboda	Sarajevo
15:00 CET (UTC+1)		Report		Stadium: Koševo City Stadium; Attendance: 5,000

==== Semi-finals ====
9 April 1980	Sarajevo	0–0 (1–4 p)	Red Star	Sarajevo
17:00 CEST (UTC+2)		Report		Stadium: Koševo City Stadium; Attendance: 40,000
