= 1978–79 FK Sarajevo season =

Sarajevo
1978–79 season
- Director general: Svetozar Vujović
- President: Ljubomir Grupković
- Manager: Fuad Muzurović
- Stadium: Koševo City Stadium
- Yugoslav First League: 4th
- Yugoslav Cup: Round of 32
- Highest home attendance: 35,000 vs Željezničar (13 August 1978)
- Lowest home attendance: 2,000 vs Sloboda (20 May 1979)
- Average home league attendance: 12,353
- Biggest win: Sarajevo 5–0 OFK Beograd (8 October 1978)
- Biggest defeat: Sloboda 5–0 Sarajevo (29 October 1978); Hajduk Split 5–0 Sarajevo (3 December 1978)

The 1978–79 Sarajevo season was the club's 32nd season in history, and their 30th season in the top flight of Yugoslav football, the Yugoslav First League. Besides competing in the First League, the team competed in the National Cup.

== Squad information ==
=== First-team squad ===
Note: Flags indicate national team as defined under FIFA eligibility rules; some limited exceptions apply. Players may hold more than one non-FIFA nationality.

No.	Pos.	Nation	Player
—	GK	YUG	Miloš Đurković
—	GK	YUG	Sead Gruda
—	GK	YUG	Irfan Handžić
5	DF	YUG	Nijaz Ferhatović
—	DF	YUG	Faruk Hadžibegić
—	DF	YUG	Mirza Kapetanović
—	DF	YUG	Zoran Lukić
—	DF	YUG	Nihad Milak
—	DF	YUG	Ante Rajković
—	DF	YUG	Nenad Vidaković
—	DF	YUG	Želimir Vidović
—	MF	YUG	Abdel Bešović
—	MF	YUG	Branko Bošnjak
—	MF	YUG	Hajrudin Buljetović

No.	Pos.	Nation	Player
—	MF	YUG	Sead Hodžić
—	MF	YUG	Mehmed Janjoš
—	MF	YUG	Nijaz Merdanović
—	MF	YUG	Senad Merdanović
—	MF	YUG	Predrag Pašić
—	MF	YUG	Dragoljub Simić
—	MF	YUG	Haris Smajić
—	MF	YUG	Safet Sušić (Captain)
—	FW	YUG	Vahid Avdić
—	FW	YUG	Sadik Fejzić
—	FW	YUG	Predrag Kurteš
—	FW	YUG	Agim Nikolić
—	FW	YUG	Srebrenko Repčić
—	FW	YUG	Radomir Savić

== Competitions ==
=== Overview ===
Competition	First match	Last match	Starting round	Final position	Record							
Competition	First match	Last match	Starting round	Final position	Pld	W	D	L	GF	GA	GD	Win %
Yugoslav First League	13 August 1978	17 June 1979	Matchday 1	4th	34	17	5	12	56	53	+3	50.00
Yugoslav Cup	30 August 1978		Round of 32	Round of 32	1	0	0	1	0	4	−4	0.00
Total					35	17	5	13	56	57	−1	48.57

Source: Competitions

=== Yugoslav First League ===
==== League table ====
Pos	Team	Pld	W	D	L	GF	GA	GD	Pts	Qualification or relegation
2	Dinamo Zagreb	34	21	8	5	67	38	+29	50	Qualification for UEFA Cup first round
3	Red Star Belgrade	34	16	9	9	51	33	+18	41	Qualification for UEFA Cup first round
4	Sarajevo	34	17	5	12	56	53	+3	39	
5	Velež	34	15	8	11	50	41	+9	38	
6	Budućnost	34	15	8	11	33	36	−3	38	

Source: rsssf.org
Rules for classification: 1) points; 2) goal difference; 3) number of goals scored.

==== Matches ====
13 August 1978 1	Sarajevo	2–0	Željezničar	Sarajevo
		Report		Stadium: Koševo City Stadium; Attendance: 35,000

20 August 1978 2	Dinamo	2–1	Sarajevo	Zagreb
		Report		Stadium: Maksimir Stadium; Attendance: 20,000

24 August 1978 3	Sarajevo	2–1	Radnički	Sarajevo
		Report		Stadium: Koševo City Stadium; Attendance: 3,000

27 August 1978 4	Borac	1–1	Sarajevo	Banja Luka
		Report		Stadium: Banja Luka City Stadium; Attendance: 7,000

3 September 1978 5	Sarajevo	2–0	Osijek	Sarajevo
		Report		Stadium: Koševo City Stadium; Attendance: 10,000

10 September 1978 6	Velež	1–0	Sarajevo	Mostar
		Report		Stadium: Bijeli Brijeg Stadium; Attendance: 15,000

17 September 1978 7	Sarajevo	3–2	Vojvodina	Sarajevo
		Report		Stadium: Koševo City Stadium; Attendance: 10,000

24 September 1978 8	Rijeka	5–2	Sarajevo	Rijeka
		Report		Stadium: Kantrida Stadium; Attendance: 7,000

8 October 1978 9	Sarajevo	5–0	OFK Beograd	Sarajevo
		Report		Stadium: Koševo City Stadium; Attendance: 8,000

15 October 1978 10	Sarajevo	1–1	Zagreb	Sarajevo
		Report		Stadium: Koševo City Stadium; Attendance: 5,000

29 October 1978 11	Sloboda	5–0	Sarajevo	Tuzla
		Report		Stadium: Tušanj City Stadium; Attendance: 6,000

5 November 1978 12	Sarajevo	2–1	Partizan	Sarajevo
		Report		Stadium: Koševo City Stadium; Attendance: 20,000

12 November 1978 13	Red Star	0–1	Sarajevo	Belgrade
		Report		Stadium: Marakana Stadium; Attendance: 10,000

19 November 1978 14	Sarajevo	1–0	Budućnost	Sarajevo
		Report		Stadium: Koševo City Stadium; Attendance: 9,000

26 November 1978 15	Napredak	0–0	Sarajevo	Kruševac
		Report		Stadium: Mladost Stadium; Attendance: 18,000

29 November 1978 16	Sarajevo	3–0	Olimpija	Sarajevo
		Report		Stadium: Koševo City Stadium; Attendance: 4,000

3 December 1978 17	Hajduk	5–0	Sarajevo	Split
		Report		Stadium: Plinara Stadion; Attendance: 20,000

4 March 1979 18	Željezničar	4–2	Sarajevo	Sarajevo
		Report		Stadium: Grbavica Stadium; Attendance: 20,000

11 March 1979 19	Sarajevo	0–1	Dinamo	Sarajevo
		Report		Stadium: Koševo City Stadium; Attendance: 20,000

18 March 1979 20	Radnički	2–0	Sarajevo	Niš
		Report		Stadium: Čair Stadium; Attendance: 6,000

25 March 1979 21	Sarajevo	5–1	Borac	Sarajevo
		Report		Stadium: Koševo City Stadium; Attendance: 6,000

8 April 1979 22	Osijek	0–1	Sarajevo	Osijek
		Report		Stadium: Gradski Vrt Stadium; Attendance: 12,000

16 April 1979 23	Sarajevo	2–1	Velež	Sarajevo
		Report		Stadium: Koševo City Stadium; Attendance: 15,000

22 April 1979 24	Vojvodina	3–4	Sarajevo	Novi Sad
		Report		Stadium: Stadion Vojvodine; Attendance: 8,000

29 April 1979 25	Sarajevo	3–2	Rijeka	Sarajevo
		Report		Stadium: Koševo City Stadium; Attendance: 8,000

6 May 1979 26	OFK Beograd	3–0	Sarajevo	Belgrade
		Report		Stadium: Karaburma Stadium; Attendance: 2,500

9 May 1979 27	Zagreb	3–1	Sarajevo	Zagreb
		Report		Stadium: Stadion Kranjčevićeva; Attendance: 7,000

12 May 1979 28	Sarajevo	2–1	Sloboda	Sarajevo
		Report		Stadium: Koševo City Stadium; Attendance: 2,000

27 May 1979 30	Sarajevo	0–0	Red Star	Sarajevo
		Report		Stadium: Koševo City Stadium; Attendance: 20,000

30 May 1979 31	Budućnost	1–4	Sarajevo	Podgorica
		Report		Stadium: Podgorica City Stadium; Attendance: 7,000

3 June 1979 32	Sarajevo	3–1	Napredak	Sarajevo
		Report		Stadium: Koševo City Stadium; Attendance: 5,000

6 June 1979 29	Partizan	1–1	Sarajevo	Belgrade
		Report		Stadium: JNA Stadium; Attendance: 25,000

10 June 1979 33	Olimpija	3–1	Sarajevo	Ljubljana
		Report		Stadium: Bežigrad Stadium; Attendance: 17,000

17 June 1979 34	Sarajevo	1–2	Hajduk	Sarajevo
		Report		Stadium: Koševo City Stadium; Attendance: 30,000

=== Yugoslav Cup ===
==== Round of 32 ====
30 August 1978	Željezničar	4–0	Sarajevo	Sarajevo
18:30 CEST (UTC+2)		Report		Stadium: Grbavica Stadium; Attendance: 10,000
