= 1982–83 Yugoslav Cup =

1982–83 Yugoslav Football Cup
35th Marshal Tito Cup

Tournament details
- Country: Yugoslavia
- Dates: 26 October 1982 – 24 May 1983
- Teams: 32

Final positions
- Champions: Dinamo Zagreb (7th title)
- Runners-up: Sarajevo

Tournament statistics
- Matches played: 31
- Top goal scorer: Zlatko Kranjčar (8)

The 1982–83 Yugoslav Cup was the 35th season of the top football knockout competition in SFR Yugoslavia, the Yugoslav Cup (Serbo-Croatian: Kup Jugoslavije), also known as the "Marshal Tito Cup" (Kup Maršala Tita), since its establishment in 1946.

The 1981–82 winners Red Star failed to retain the trophy as they were knocked out in the second round by Rijeka. Previous season's runners-up Dinamo Zagreb and Sarajevo reached the tournament final, in which Dinamo won their 7th cup title by beating Sarajevo 3–2 through goals by Zlatko Kranjčar and Snješko Cerin. This was their second major silverware won under the guidance of Miroslav Blažević, with whom they previously won the 1981–82 Yugoslav First League championship, their first league title in 24 years.

Surprise of the tournament were the Rijeka-based minnows Orijent who managed to reach the quarter-finals, where they were knocked on penalties after holding the eventual runners-up Sarajevo to a 0–0 draw.

== Calendar ==
The Yugoslav Cup was a tournament for which clubs from all tiers of the football pyramid were eligible to enter. In addition, amateur teams put together by individual Yugoslav People's Army garrisons and various factories and industrial plants were also encouraged to enter, which meant that each cup edition could have several thousands of teams in its preliminary stages. These teams would play through a number of qualifying rounds before reaching the first round proper, in which they would be paired with top-flight teams.

The cup final was played on 24 May, traditionally scheduled to coincide with Youth Day celebrated on 25 May, a national holiday in Yugoslavia which also doubled as the official commemoration of Josip Broz Tito's birthday.

Round	Legs	Date	Fixtures	Clubs
First round (round of 32)	Single	26 October 1982	16	32 → 16
Second round (round of 16)	Single	10 November 1982	8	16 → 8
Quarter-finals	Single	23 March 1983	4	8 → 4
Semi-finals	Single	27 April 1983	2	4 → 2
Final	Single	24 May 1983	1	2 → 1

== First round ==
In the following tables winning teams are marked in bold; teams from outside top level are marked in italic script.

Tie no	Home team	Score	Away team
1	AIK Bačka Topola	2–4	**Red Star**
2	Prishtina	0–1	**OFK Belgrade**
3	JNA Garrison Raška	1–1 (8–9 p)	**Hajduk Split**
4	Jedinstvo Bijelo Polje	0–2	**Dinamo Zagreb**
5	LIO Osijek	0–0 (2–4 p)	**Vardar**
6	**Orijent**	2–0	Osijek
7	**Partizan**	1–0	Leotar
8	**Rabotnički**	2–2 (6–4 p)	Željezničar
9	Radnički Niš	1–2	**Galenika**
10	Rudar Kakanj	0–3	**Sarajevo**
11	Slovan	0–1	**Velež**
12	Spartak	0–1	**Budućnost**
13	Teteks	1–1 (3–5 p)	**Sloboda**
14	Viko-Omladinac	0–4	**Rijeka**
15	**Vojvodina**	6–1	Borac Čačak
16	NK Zagreb	0–2	**Olimpija**

== Second round ==
Tie no	Home team	Score	Away team
1	Red Star	1–3	**Rijeka**
2	**Dinamo Zagreb**	3–2	Velež
3	**Sarajevo**	5–2	Rabotnički
4	**Hajduk Split**	5–0	Budućnost
5	**OFK Belgrade**	3–2	Galenika
6	Olimpija	0–0 (6–7 p)	**Orijent**
7	**Sloboda**	3–2	Partizan
8	Vardar	0–1	**Vojvodina**

== Quarter-finals ==
Tie no	Home team	Score	Away team
1	**Dinamo Zagreb**	6–0	Sloboda
2	**Rijeka**	1–0	Vojvodina
3	OFK Belgrade	0–2	**Hajduk Split**
4	Orijent	0–0 (3–4 p)	**Sarajevo**

== Semi-finals ==
Tie no	Home team	Score	Away team
1	**Sarajevo**	1–0	Hajduk Split
2	Rijeka	1–3	**Dinamo Zagreb**

== Final ==
1983 Yugoslav Cup Final
Dinamo Zagreb	Sarajevo
3	2
- Date: 24 May 1983
- Venue: Red Star Stadium, Belgrade

The 1983 Yugoslav Cup Final was contested by Dinamo Zagreb and Sarajevo at the Red Star Stadium in Belgrade. Dinamo Zagreb won 3–2, with two goals by Zlatko Kranjčar and one from Snješko Cerin. Dinamo had reached the final eleven times previously, winning six titles (1951, 1960, 1963, 1965, 1969, 1980). It also proved to be their last Yugoslav Cup win as they never repeated the feat until the competition was made defunct in 1991. For Sarajevo, this was their second appearance in the final (having lost the 1967 final to Hajduk Split), and was also their last final appearance.

This was one of the trophies won by Dinamo in their successful spell in the early 1980s, which include winning the 1981–82 Yugoslav First League and the 1979–80 Yugoslav Cup, and was the second major silverware won by Dinamo under the guidance of Miroslav Blažević.

=== Match details ===
24 May 1983

Dinamo Zagreb	3–2	Sarajevo
Kranjčar 14' 35'; Cerin 31'		Musemić 29'; Kapetanović 73'

Red Star Stadium, Belgrade
Attendance: 25,000
Referee: Delević (Belgrade)

**Dinamo Zagreb**	**FK Sarajevo**

GK	**1**	(Socialist Federal Republic of Yugoslavia) Marijan Vlak
DF	**2**	(Socialist Federal Republic of Yugoslavia) Ante Rumora
DF	**3**	(Socialist Federal Republic of Yugoslavia) Zvjezdan Cvetković
DF	**4**	(Socialist Federal Republic of Yugoslavia) Ismet Hadžić
DF	**5**	(Socialist Federal Republic of Yugoslavia) Mladen Munjaković
DF	**6**	(Socialist Federal Republic of Yugoslavia) Srećko Bogdan (c)
MF	**7**	(Socialist Federal Republic of Yugoslavia) Zlatan Arnautović
FW	**8**	(Socialist Federal Republic of Yugoslavia) Snješko Cerin
FW	**9**	(Socialist Federal Republic of Yugoslavia) Zlatko Kranjčar	(substituted off) 81'
MF	**10**	(Socialist Federal Republic of Yugoslavia) Marko Mlinarić
FW	**11**	(Socialist Federal Republic of Yugoslavia) Borislav Cvetković	(substituted off) 79'
Substitutes:
MF	?	(Socialist Federal Republic of Yugoslavia) Velimir Zajec	(substituted on) 79'
FW	?	(Australia) Eddie Krncevic	(substituted on) 81'
Manager:
(Socialist Federal Republic of Yugoslavia) Miroslav Blažević

GK	**1**	(Socialist Federal Republic of Yugoslavia) Slobodan Janjuš
DF	**2**	(Socialist Federal Republic of Yugoslavia) Ferid Radeljaš
DF	**3**	(Socialist Federal Republic of Yugoslavia) Mirza Kapetanović
DF	**4**	(Socialist Federal Republic of Yugoslavia) Želimir Vidović	(substituted off) 36'
DF	**5**	(Socialist Federal Republic of Yugoslavia) Nijaz Ferhatović
DF	**6**	(Socialist Federal Republic of Yugoslavia) Faruk Hadžibegić
MF	**7**	(Socialist Federal Republic of Yugoslavia) Dragan Božović
MF	**8**	(Socialist Federal Republic of Yugoslavia) Slaviša Vukićević
FW	**9**	(Socialist Federal Republic of Yugoslavia) Husref Musemić
DF	**10**	(Socialist Federal Republic of Yugoslavia) Davor Jozić
MF	**11**	(Socialist Federal Republic of Yugoslavia) Boban Božović	(substituted off) 46'
Substitutes:
MF	?	(Socialist Federal Republic of Yugoslavia) Mehmed Janjoš	(substituted on) 36'
MF	?	(Socialist Federal Republic of Yugoslavia) Senad Merdanović	(substituted on) 46'
Manager:
(Socialist Federal Republic of Yugoslavia) Boško Antić

== See also ==
- 1982–83 Yugoslav First League
- 1982–83 Yugoslav Second League
