= Slaviša Vukičević =

Bosnian footballer

Personal information
- Date of birth: 30 April 1962 (age 64)
- Place of birth: Visoko, PR Bosnia and Herzegovina, Yugoslavia
- Position: Midfielder

Youth career
- 1976–1980: Bosna Visoko

Senior career*
Years	Team	Apps	(Gls)
1980–1989	Sarajevo	326	(34)
1989–1996	US Créteil	196	(21)
1996–1998	US Ivry	27	(2)
Total		549	(57)

International career
1992–1995	Bosnia and Herzegovina XI	4	(0)

Managerial career
- 1993–1996: US Créteil (Youth team)
- 1996–1998: US Ivry (youth team)
- 1998–2000: AS Arménienne
- 2000–2001: US Créteil (sporting director)
- 2001–2003: US Créteil
- 2003–2005: US Créteil (sporting director)
- * Club domestic league appearances and goals

Slaviša "Slavko" Vukičević (Serbian Cyrillic: Славиша "Славко" Вукичевић; born 30 April 1962) is a Bosnian retired professional footballer, former football manager, footballing agent and sports official.

== Playing career ==
=== Club ===
Vukičević was born in Visoko, Yugoslavia. Coming through the youth department of his local hometown side FK Bosna Visoko, he was acquired by Yugoslav First League club FK Sarajevo in 1980. Even though considered a massive talent, he did not get much playing time in his first two years with the club, being overlooked by the coaching staff that preferred fielding more experienced footballers. With the departure of a vast array of players after the 1982-1983 season, including club legends Safet Sušić, Srebrenko Repčić and Ante Rajković, the club management decided to build a new team made up of youngsters that either came up through the club's youth department or were, as in the case of Vukičević, brought in as youth players from the Sarajevo region. This young team that he had become an integral part of included the likes of Husref Musemić, Dragan Jakovljević, Boban Božović, Faruk Hadžibegić, Mehmed Janjoš, Predrag Pašić and Zijad Švrakić, and would eventually go on to win the Yugoslav national title in the 1984-1985 season, becoming only the second FK Sarajevo outfit to do so. His last minute goal against a tough Vojvodina side, three matches before the end of the campaign was decisive in the side's title aspirations and was subsequently voted goal of the season. In 1989, he left his native Yugoslavia and joined French club US Créteil whom he represented for six seasons. He eventually retired from professional football in 1998 after playing two seasons for US Ivry.

=== International ===
Between 1992 and 1996, during the Bosnian war, he represented Bosnia and Herzegovina internationally, even though the Bosnian FA was not officially recognized for most of his international tenure, and the team only contested humanitarian matches with the aim of garnering support and aid for the newly independent state. Because of his decision to represent Bosnia and Herzegovina as an ethnic Serb, he received numerous threats from Serb nationalists during the war.

== Managerial career ==
While still a player with Créteil he started his managerial career in the club's youth department. After transferring to US Ivry he again took over the side's youth team, before eventually being named manager of AS Arménienne whom he led for two seasons. In 2000, he was named sporting director of his former club Créteil, that was competing in Ligue 2 at the time. A year later he was named manager of the club, hence holding positions of both sporting director and first team manager for two seasons, before relinquishing the latter. He held the position of sporting director until 2005, before deciding to focus on being a footballing agent.

== Sports official ==
In 1997, he was named board member of the French association of professional managers and Vice-president of the Parisian-Val de Marne association of professional managers. Since 2010 he is a FIFA recognized agent and has worked as an official scout for Paris Saint-Germain, Bordeaux and Saint-Étienne In 2016, he organized a Real Madrid youth camp in his hometown of Visoko.

== Honours ==
=== As a player ===
Sarajevo

- Yugoslav First League: 1984–85
