= Janjuš =

Janjuš is a surname. Notable people with the surname include:

- Milorad Janjuš (born 1982), Serbian footballer
- Slobodan Janjuš (born 1952), Yugoslav football goalkeeper
