= 1984–85 Yugoslav First League =

Prva savezna liga
- Season: 1984–85
- Dates: 19 August 1984 – 30 June 1985
- Champions: Sarajevo (2nd title)
- Promoted: Čelik Zenica; OFK Belgrade
- Relegated: Iskra Bugojno; Radnički Niš
- European Cup: Sarajevo
- UEFA Cup: Hajduk Split; Partizan; Vardar
- Cup Winners' Cup: Red Star Belgrade
- Top goalscorer: Zlatko Vujović (25)
- Average attendance: 8,533

In the 1984-85 Yugoslav First League season, FK Sarajevo has won the second Yugoslavian league title in club's history.

== Teams ==
=== Changes from last season ===
Teams promoted from 1983 to 1984 Yugoslav Second League

- Iskra
- Sutjeska

Teams relegated to 1984–85 Yugoslav Second League

- 17th place: Olimpija
- 18th place: Čelik

=== Overview ===
| Team | Home city | Republic | Stadium | Position in 1983–84 |
|---|---|---|---|---|
| Budućnost | Titograd | MNE | Stadion pod Goricom | 14th |
| Red Star | Belgrade | SRB | Stadion Crvena Zvezda | 1st |
| Dinamo Vinkovci | Vinkovci | CRO | Stadion Mladosti | 11th |
| Dinamo Zagreb | Zagreb | CRO | Stadion Maksimir | 12th |
| Hajduk Split | Split | CRO | Gradski stadion u Poljudu | 5th |
| Iskra | Bugojno | BIH | Stadion Jaklić | |
| Osijek | Osijek | CRO | Stadion Gradski vrt | 6th |
| Partizan | Belgrade | SRB | Stadion JNA | 2nd |
| Priština | Priština | SRB | Gradski stadion Priština | 8th |
| Radnički Niš | Niš | SRB | Stadion Čair | 7th |
| Rijeka | Rijeka | CRO | Stadion na Kantridi | 4th |
| Sarajevo | Sarajevo | BIH | Stadion Koševo | 9th |
| Sloboda | Tuzla | BIH | Stadion Tušanj | 16th |
| Sutjeska | Nikšić | MNE | Gradski stadion Nikšić | |
| Vardar | Skopje | MKD | Gradski stadion Skopje | 15th |
| Velež | Mostar | BIH | Stadion Bijeli Brijeg | 13th |
| Vojvodina | Novi Sad | SRB | Stadion Vojvodine | 10th |
| Željezničar | Sarajevo | BIH | Stadion Grbavica | 3rd |

== League table ==
| Pos | Team | Pld | W | D | L | GF | GA | GD | Pts | Qualification or relegation |
|---|---|---|---|---|---|---|---|---|---|---|
| 1 | Sarajevo (C) | 34 | 19 | 10 | 5 | 51 | 30 | +21 | 48 | Qualification for European Cup first round |
| 2 | Hajduk Split | 34 | 16 | 12 | 6 | 65 | 42 | +23 | 44 | Qualification for UEFA Cup first round |
| 3 | Partizan | 34 | 14 | 11 | 9 | 46 | 34 | +12 | 39 | Qualification for UEFA Cup first round |
| 4 | Red Star Belgrade | 34 | 16 | 6 | 12 | 63 | 38 | +25 | 38 | Qualification for Cup Winners' Cup first round |
| 5 | Vardar | 34 | 16 | 5 | 13 | 67 | 58 | +9 | 37 | Qualification for UEFA Cup first round |
| 6 | Dinamo Zagreb | 34 | 14 | 8 | 12 | 47 | 38 | +9 | 36 | |
| 7 | Željezničar | 34 | 11 | 12 | 11 | 53 | 46 | +7 | 34 | |
| 8 | Rijeka | 34 | 12 | 10 | 12 | 49 | 48 | +1 | 34 | |
| 9 | Sutjeska Nikšić | 34 | 11 | 11 | 12 | 41 | 42 | −1 | 33 | |
| 10 | Priština | 34 | 13 | 6 | 15 | 44 | 49 | −5 | 32 | |
| 11 | Velež | 34 | 10 | 12 | 12 | 39 | 44 | −5 | 32 | |
| 12 | Osijek | 34 | 12 | 7 | 15 | 37 | 46 | −9 | 31 | |
| 13 | Sloboda Tuzla | 34 | 10 | 11 | 13 | 28 | 38 | −10 | 31 | |
| 14 | Dinamo Vinkovci | 34 | 11 | 8 | 15 | 40 | 51 | −11 | 30 | |
| 15 | Budućnost | 34 | 11 | 8 | 15 | 31 | 49 | −18 | 30 | |
| 16 | Vojvodina | 34 | 9 | 11 | 14 | 36 | 47 | −11 | 29 | |
| 17 | Iskra (R) | 34 | 8 | 11 | 15 | 32 | 50 | −18 | 27 | Relegation to Yugoslav Second League |
| 18 | Radnički Niš (R) | 34 | 8 | 11 | 15 | 27 | 46 | −19 | 27 | Relegation to Yugoslav Second League |

Source: rsssf.org
Rules for classification: 1) points; 2) goal difference; 3) number of goals scored.
(C) Champions; (R) Relegated

== Results ==
| Home \ Away | BUD | DVI | DZG | HAJ | ISK | OSI | PAR | PRI | RNI | RSB | RIJ | SAR | SLO | SUT | VAR | VEL | VOJ | ŽEL |
|---|---|---|---|---|---|---|---|---|---|---|---|---|---|---|---|---|---|---|
| Budućnost | | 4–0 | 1–1 | 2–3 | 2–1 | 1–0 | 2–1 | 2–0 | 1–1 | 1–2 | 1–0 | 0–0 | 0–0 | 2–1 | 2–0 | 1–1 | 1–0 | 1–4 |
| Dinamo Vinkovci | 0–0 | | 0–1 | 2–1 | 1–1 | 1–0 | 2–2 | 2–1 | 0–3 | 2–0 | 3–0 | 3–0 | 3–0 | 2–1 | 5–1 | 1–1 | 2–0 | 4–2 |
| Dinamo Zagreb | 0–1 | 0–0 | | 2–2 | 2–1 | 1–1 | 2–0 | 4–1 | 5–1 | 2–1 | 4–1 | 1–2 | 2–0 | 3–0 | 1–2 | 1–2 | 2–0 | 0–2 |
| Hajduk Split | 2–0 | 3–0 | 2–4 | | 2–0 | 1–0 | 3–3 | 2–2 | 4–0 | 1–1 | 5–2 | 0–0 | 2–0 | 1–0 | 3–2 | 3–1 | 5–1 | 2–1 |
| Iskra | 3–1 | 2–1 | 0–1 | 1–0 | | 2–0 | 1–3 | 1–1 | 1–1 | 2–1 | 1–1 | 1–3 | 2–0 | 1–1 | 1–0 | 1–1 | 1–1 | 1–1 |
| Osijek | 1–2 | 1–1 | 2–1 | 1–0 | 1–1 | | 1–0 | 2–1 | 2–0 | 3–0 | 2–2 | 2–2 | 1–0 | 1–0 | 3–1 | 3–1 | 1–0 | 2–1 |
| Partizan | 3–0 | 3–1 | 2–0 | 4–1 | 0–0 | 1–1 | | 2–0 | 2–2 | 2–1 | 1–1 | 1–0 | 1–0 | 1–1 | 4–0 | 2–0 | 0–0 | 1–0 |
| Priština | 1–0 | 3–1 | 2–0 | 1–1 | 2–0 | 3–1 | 1–2 | | 2–0 | 1–1 | 3–0 | 0–2 | 1–1 | 3–0 | 2–0 | 1–0 | 2–0 | 2–0 |
| Radnički Niš | 1–0 | 1–0 | 0–0 | 1–1 | 3–1 | 2–0 | 1–0 | 1–0 | | 0–0 | 3–0 | 0–4 | 0–0 | 1–1 | 1–2 | 0–0 | 0–0 | 0–0 |
| Red Star | 6–0 | 3–0 | 2–0 | 1–3 | 0–0 | 2–1 | 2–0 | 3–0 | 2–1 | | 3–1 | 4–1 | 2–0 | 4–1 | 7–2 | 3–0 | 4–0 | 3–1 |
| Rijeka | 3–1 | 0–0 | 3–1 | 1–1 | 3–1 | 5–0 | 0–0 | 1–2 | 3–0 | 1–0 | | 2–0 | 1–0 | 0–0 | 2–2 | 4–1 | 1–0 | 1–1 |
| Sarajevo | 0–0 | 3–0 | 0–0 | 1–0 | 3–0 | 2–1 | 3–1 | 2–0 | 4–2 | 2–1 | 1–0 | | 1–0 | 2–0 | 3–2 | 1–0 | 1–0 | 0–0 |
| Sloboda Tuzla | 2–1 | 2–0 | 0–1 | 0–0 | 1–0 | 2–1 | 1–1 | 5–1 | 1–0 | 2–1 | 2–1 | 0–0 | | 0–0 | 3–2 | 0–0 | 1–1 | 1–1 |
| Sutjeska | 0–0 | 3–0 | 1–0 | 1–3 | 2–1 | 3–1 | 2–1 | 1–1 | 1–0 | 1–1 | 1–2 | 2–0 | 3–0 | | 2–1 | 2–2 | 3–0 | 3–1 |
| Vardar | 4–1 | 4–1 | 2–0 | 1–2 | 4–0 | 2–0 | 1–0 | 5–0 | 3–0 | 3–1 | 2–1 | 2–2 | 5–2 | 0–0 | | 2–0 | 0–0 | 3–2 |
| Velež | 2–0 | 0–0 | 2–2 | 1–1 | 3–0 | 1–0 | 0–2 | 3–2 | 2–0 | 1–0 | 2–1 | 2–2 | 3–1 | 2–0 | 2–2 | | 0–1 | 0–0 |
| Vojvodina | 4–0 | 3–1 | 1–2 | 1–1 | 1–3 | 3–0 | 0–0 | 2–1 | 2–1 | 1–1 | 2–2 | 1–2 | 0–0 | 3–2 | 2–3 | 3–2 | | 3–2 |
| Željezničar | 2–0 | 2–1 | 1–1 | 4–4 | 3–0 | 1–1 | 4–0 | 2–1 | 2–0 | 2–0 | 2–3 | 2–2 | 0–1 | 2–2 | 3–2 | 2–1 | 0–0 | |

Source: DataSoccer.it
Legend: Blue = home team win; Yellow = draw; Red = away team win.

== Winning squad ==

Champions 1984–85 Yugoslav First League - FK Sarajevo winning squad

Champions: FK Sarajevo
| Player | League | |
| Player | Matches | Goals |
|---|---|---|
| (Socialist Federal Republic of Yugoslavia) Faruk Hadžibegić | 34 | 4 |
| (Socialist Federal Republic of Yugoslavia) Miloš Đurković | 34 | 0 |
| (Socialist Federal Republic of Yugoslavia) Predrag Pašić | 33 | 9 |
| (Socialist Federal Republic of Yugoslavia) Slaviša Vukićević | 33 | 3 |
| (Socialist Federal Republic of Yugoslavia) Mehmed Janjoš | 32 | 1 |
| (Socialist Federal Republic of Yugoslavia) Ferid Radeljaš | 32 | 0 |
| (Socialist Federal Republic of Yugoslavia) Husref Musemić | 31 | 19 |
| (Socialist Federal Republic of Yugoslavia) Dragan Jakovljević | 30 | 9 |
| (Socialist Federal Republic of Yugoslavia) Mirza Kapetanović | 30 | 0 |
| (Socialist Federal Republic of Yugoslavia) Davor Jozić | 29 | 2 |
| (Socialist Federal Republic of Yugoslavia) Senad Merdanović | 23 | 3 |
| (Socialist Federal Republic of Yugoslavia) Nihad Milak | 17 | 0 |
| (Socialist Federal Republic of Yugoslavia) Zijad Švrakić | 16 | 0 |
| (Socialist Federal Republic of Yugoslavia) Edin Hadžialagić | 13 | 1 |
| (Socialist Federal Republic of Yugoslavia) Goran Jurišić | 10 | 0 |
| (Socialist Federal Republic of Yugoslavia) Ivica Vujičević | 8 | 0 |
| (Socialist Federal Republic of Yugoslavia) Tomislav Bošnjak | 5 | 0 |
| (Socialist Federal Republic of Yugoslavia) Dragan Božović | 5 | 0 |
| (Socialist Federal Republic of Yugoslavia) Vladimir Petković | 2 | 0 |
| (Socialist Federal Republic of Yugoslavia) Dejan Raičković | 2 | 0 |
| (Socialist Federal Republic of Yugoslavia) Esad Hošić | 1 | 0 |
| (Socialist Federal Republic of Yugoslavia) Agim Nikolić | 1 | 0 |
Head coach: Boško Antić

== Top scorers ==
| Rank | Player | Club | Goals |
|---|---|---|---|
| 1 | (Socialist Federal Republic of Yugoslavia) Zlatko Vujović | Hajduk Split | 25 |
| 2 | (Socialist Federal Republic of Yugoslavia) Darko Pančev | Vardar | 20 |
| 3 | (Socialist Federal Republic of Yugoslavia) Husref Musemić | Sarajevo | 19 |
| 4 | (Socialist Federal Republic of Yugoslavia) Sulejman Halilović | Red Star | 18 |
| 5 | (Socialist Federal Republic of Yugoslavia) Zoran Batrović | Priština | 15 |
| 6 | (Socialist Federal Republic of Yugoslavia) Ivan Gudelj | Hajduk Split | 12 |
| 6 | (Socialist Federal Republic of Yugoslavia) Dragan Mance | Partizan | 12 |
| 8 | (Socialist Federal Republic of Yugoslavia) Zvonko Varga | Partizan | 11 |
| 8 | (Socialist Federal Republic of Yugoslavia) Zoran Samardžija | Željezničar | 11 |

== Attendance ==
| Club | Average home attendance | Average away attendance |
|---|---|---|
| FK Priština | 18,647 | 6,529 |
| Red Star Belgrade | 17,529 | 19,529 |
| FK Vardar | 13,588 | 7,176 |
| Hajduk Split | 12,941 | 16,176 |
| FK Partizan | 11,471 | 14,588 |
| Dinamo Zagreb | 11,471 | 10,706 |
| FK Sarajevo | 8,471 | 10,176 |
| FK Željezničar | 7,118 | 8,882 |
| Radnički Niš | 6,765 | 6,765 |
| Iskra Bugojno | 6,647 | 5,588 |
| FK Velež | 5,882 | 6,118 |
| NK Rijeka | 5,706 | 6,471 |
| Sutjeska Nikšić | 5,353 | 6,412 |
| FK Vojvodina | 5,176 | 6,000 |
| Budućnost Titograd | 4,824 | 5,941 |
| NK Osijek | 4,176 | 5,176 |
| Dinamo Vinkovci | 3,941 | 5,941 |
| Sloboda Tuzla | 3,882 | 5,412 |

- Overall league attendance per match: 8,533 spectators

== See also ==
- 1984–85 Yugoslav Second League
- 1984–85 Yugoslav Cup
