= Jardol =

- Village
- Location within Bosnia and Herzegovina
- Coordinates: 44.1815921°N 17.7697318°E
- Country: Bosnia and Herzegovina
- Entity: Federation of Bosnia and Herzegovina
- Canton: Central Bosnia
- Municipality: Vitez

Area
  - Total: 0.77 sq mi (1.99 km^{2})

Population (2013)
  - Total: 590
  - Density: 770/sq mi (300/km^{2})
- Time zone: UTC+1 (CET)
  - Summer (DST): UTC+2 (CEST)

Jardol is a village in the municipality of Vitez, Bosnia and Herzegovina.

== Demographics ==
According to the 2013 census, its population was 590.

Ethnicity in 2013
Ethnicity	Number	Percentage
Croats	540	91.5%
Bosniaks	41	6.9%
Serbs	3	0.5%
other/undeclared	6	1.0%
Total	590	100%
