= Muhidin Teskeredžić =

Bosnian professional footballer

Personal information
- Date of birth: July 2, 1958 (age 68)
- Place of birth: Rogatica, FPR Yugoslavia
- Position: Striker

Youth career
- Mladost Rogatica

Senior career*
Years	Team	Apps	(Gls)
1978–1981	Iskra Sarajevo	87	(33)
1981–1986	FK Sarajevo	107	(36)
1986–1987	Sturm Graz	22	(5)
1987–1988	Admira Wacker	19	(4)
1988–1991	FK Sarajevo	37	(9)
- * Club domestic league appearances and goals

Muhidin Teskeredžić (born 2 July 1958 in Rogatica, SR Bosnia, FPR Yugoslavia) is a Bosnian retired footballer.

== Club career ==
He passed the youth ranks of local club Mladost Rogatica and eventually signed with lower-tier side Iskra Sarajevo in 1978. After three seasons with Iskra he moved to FK Sarajevo where he won the Yugoslav First League title in 1985. He went on to play for Austrian sides Sturm Graz and Admira Wacker before moving back to FK Sarajevo, where he retired from professional football in 1991.
