= Tomislav Bošnjak =

Bosnian-Herzegovinian footballer

Personal information
- Full name: Tomislav Bošnjak
- Date of birth: 19 October 1963 (age 63)
- Place of birth: Sarajevo, SFR Yugoslavia
- Position: Defender

Youth career
- Sarajevo

Senior career*
| Years | Team | Apps | (Gls) |
| 1983-1986 | Sarajevo | 31 | (0) |
| 1986-1987 | Zadar | 22 | (0) |
| 1987-1989 | Olimpija Ljubljana | 30 | (1) |
| 1989-1991 | Rabat Ajax | 39 | (5) |
| 1991-1992 | Víkingur | 26 | (3) |
- * Club domestic league appearances and goals

Tomislav Bošnjak (19 October 1963) is a Yugoslav and Bosnian retired footballer who played as a defender.

== Club career ==
Born in Sarajevo, Bošnjak started his professional career with his hometown club, FK Sarajevo in 1983, going on to win the Yugoslav First League title in the 1984-85 season, even though he was given limited playing opportunities, before making a move to Zadar and subsequently to Olimpija Ljubljana, where he established himself as a first-choice sweeper. He played a further three seasons in the Maltese Premier League and Icelandic Besta deild karla with Rabat Ajax and Víkingur, respectively.

== Honours ==
Sarajevo

- Yugoslav First League: 1984–85
