= Zijad Švrakić =

Bosnian footballer (born 1960)

Zijad Švrakić (Ziya Yıldız)
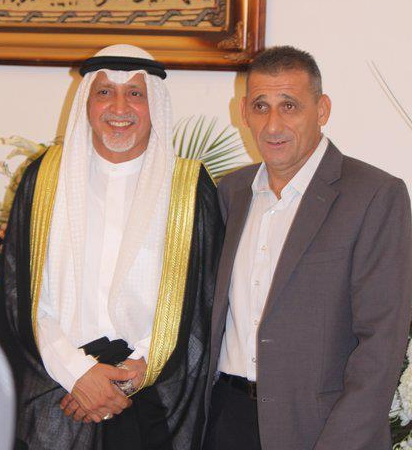
- Švrakić (right) in 2014

Personal information
- Date of birth: 21 September 1960 (age 66)
- Place of birth: Sarajevo, SFR Yugoslavia
- Height: 1.76 m (5 ft 9 in)
- Positions: Winger; forward

Youth career
- 1970–1979: Sarajevo

Senior career*
Years	Team	Apps	(Gls)
1979–1987	Sarajevo	164	(36)
1987–1989	Adana Demirspor	86	(42)
1989–1990	Galatasaray	22	(2)
1990–1991	Ankaragücü	66	(26)
1991–1994	Karşıyaka	120	(37)
1994–2001	Rabat Ajax	148	(34)
Total		606	(177)

International career
1979	Yugoslavia U21	4	(3)
1983–1984	Yugoslavia Olympic	2	(0)
1983	Yugoslavia	1	(0)
1993	Bosnia and Herzegovina	1	(1)

Managerial career
- 1994–1996: Rabat Ajax (interim player-manager)
- 1996–2001: Rabat Ajax
- 2001–2004: Floriana
- 2004–2006: Sarajevo (youth coordinator)
- 2006–2010: Al Jahra
- 2010–2011: Al Salmiya
- 2012–2013: Al-Seeb
- 2014–2015: Sur SC
- 2016–2017: FK Sarajevo (assistant)
- 2020–2021: FK UNIS Vogošća
- * Club domestic league appearances and goals

Zijad Švrakić (born 21 September 1960), also known as Ziya Yıldız after acquiring Turkish citizenship is a Bosnian retired footballer and manager. As a member of the Sarajevo squad that won the Yugoslav First League in 1985, he was best known for his speed and dribbling ability. After leaving his homeland he spent seven years playing professionally in Turkey, where he represented Adana Demirspor, Galatasaray, Ankaragücü and Karşıyaka. He concluded his playing career with Maltese Premier League football club Rabat Ajax.

He represented Yugoslavia and Bosnia and Herzegovina internationally.

== Playing career ==
A Sarajevo native, Švrakić came through the youth set up of FK Sarajevo before signing his first professional contract in 1979, eventually inheriting the number 7 jersey previously worn by club legend Safet Sušić.

In his first season, he took part in the club's runners-up league finish, even though he did not get much playing time, being overlooked by the coaching staff that preferred fielding more experienced footballers. With the departure of a vast array of players after the 1982-1983 season the club management decided to build a new team made up of youngsters that came up through the club's youth department. Švrakić's skill helped the young team eventually win the Yugoslav First League in 1985, becoming the second FK Sarajevo outfit to do so.

In 1987, he joined Turkish Süper Lig side Adana Demirspor whom he represented in the next two seasons, helping the team avoid relegation by scoring 42 goals in 86 matches. In the summer of 1989 he was acquired by Turkish powerhouse Galatasaray for a then-record 800,000 DEM, eventually going on to play for Ankaragücü and Karşıyaka, captaining the latter and thus becoming only the second foreign-born captain in Turkish Süper Lig history.

Švrakić spent two more seasons in the Maltese Premier League with Rabat Ajax before retiring in 1996 at the age of 36.

== International career ==
He earned his first cap for Yugoslavia in 1983, coming on as a 70th-minute substitute in a friendly tie against West Germany, managing to find the back of the net on his debut. After being included in the Yugoslav Olympic national team roster for the 1984 Summer Olympics he had to withdraw after suffering a horrendous knee injury during a tour in Libya with FK Sarajevo. Between 1992 and 1994, during the Bosnian war, he represented Bosnia and Herzegovina internationally, even though the Bosnian FA was not officially recognized for most of his international tenure, and the team only contested humanitarian matches with the aim of garnering support and aid for the newly independent state.

== Managerial career ==
Švrakić began his managerial career as interim player-manager at Rabat Ajax in 1994, eventually taking over the team and managing it for a further seven seasons. In The summer of 2001 Švrakić was appointed manager of Floriana whom he led for the next two seasons, after which he moved back to his native Bosnia and Herzegovina and lead the FK Sarajevo youth academy.

In 2006, he was appointed manager of Kuwaiti club Al Jahra with whom he gained promotion to the top tier and reached the final of the Kuwait Crown Cup, eventually taking home the silver medal. In 2010, he was approached by Al Salmiya, and would go on to manage the team for a season. In 2012, he was appointed manager of Omantel Professional League team Al-Seeb which he kept in the top tier. In the summer of 2014 Švrakić was appointed manager of Omantel Professional League side Sur SC and led the side to a runners-up finish in his first season at the club. On 29 August 2016 Švrakić was named assistant manager of FK Sarajevo.

As of 2022 Švrakić has been a visiting volunteer advisor to BG Elite FC, a premium youth academy established by Bosnian immigrants in Bowling Green, Kentucky. Furthermore, Švrakić has been an advisory member of Denver-based US Soccer Education since 2021.

== Honours ==
=== Player ===
Sarajevo

- Yugoslav First League: 1984–85

Ankaragücü

- Chancellor Cup: 1990–91

Karşıyaka

- TFF Second League: 1991–92

Individual

- Yugoslav First League Team of the Year: 1983–84
- Süper Lig Team of the Year: 1987–88
- Süper Lig Player of the Month: 1987–88, 1988–89, 1990–91
- Adana Demirspor Best Foreign player in club history: 2016
