= Ferid Radeljaš =

Bosnian-Herzegovina footballer

Personal information
- Full name: Ferid Radeljaš
- Date of birth: 22 August 1959 (age 67)
- Place of birth: Foča, FPR Yugoslavia
- Position: Defender

Senior career*
Years	Team	Apps	(Gls)
1979–1988	FK Sarajevo	194	(3)
Total		194	(3)
- * Club domestic league appearances and goals

Ferid Radeljaš (born 22 August 1959) is a retired Bosnian-Herzegovinian professional footballer.

== Club career ==
He was a member of the FK Sarajevo squad that won the Yugoslav First League title in 1985, playing alongside club legends Husref Musemić, Faruk Hadžibegić, Davor Jozić, Dragan Jakovljević and Mehmed Janjoš among others. He left Yugoslavia in 1988 to play in the lower leagues there.

== Personal life ==
As of 2018, Radeljaš still lives in Grandvillars with his wife Mevlida and three children.
