= Nijaz Merdanović =

Bosnian footballer

33rd President of the Assembly of FK Sarajevo
- In office 2005 – June 2010
- Preceded by: Hajrudin Šuman
- Succeeded by: Zijad Blekić

Personal details
- Born: 15 January 1957 (age 69) Kakanj, SR Bosnia and Herzegovina, SFR Yugoslavia
Association football career
- Full name: Nijaz Merdanović
- Position: Winger
Senior career*
Years	Team	Apps	(Gls)
1973–1982	Sarajevo	301	(42)
Total		301	(42)
- * Club domestic league appearances and goals

Nijaz Merdanović (born 15 January 1957) is a Bosnian retired professional footballer and current marketing director of the Football Association of Bosnia and Herzegovina.

== Playing career ==
At the time considered one of Yugoslavia's biggest footballing talents, Merdanić debuted for Sarajevo at the age of 16, becoming the youngest player in the history of the club to appear in a senior league game. A chronic knee injury that resulted in three separate operations would end his playing career at the age of only 27.

== Administrative career ==
After retiring from football, Merdanić was named as Sarajevo's General Secretary, and would eventually go on to become the 33rd President of the club Assembly, staying on that position from September 2005 until June 2010. He is the current marketing director of the Football Association of Bosnia and Herzegovina.

== Personal life ==
Nijaz's younger brother Senad also played for Sarajevo.
