= Boban Božović =

Bosnia and Herzegovina footballer

Personal information
- Date of birth: 24 November 1963 (age 62)
- Place of birth: Sarajevo, SFR Yugoslavia
- Position: Midfielder

Senior career*
Years	Team	Apps	(Gls)
1981–1990	FK Sarajevo	159	(28)
1990–1992	Lens	2	(0)
1992–1993	Istres	31	(4)
1993–1994	Montluçon	7	(1)
1994–1995	GFC Ajaccio	20	(2)

International career
1983	Yugoslavia	1	(0)
- * Club domestic league appearances and goals

Boban Božović (born 24 November 1963) is a retired Bosnian-Herzegovinian midfielder who played for SFR Yugoslavia.

== Club career ==
He was a member of the memorable Sarajevo squad that won the 1984–85 Yugoslav First League.

== International career ==
He made his debut for Yugoslavia in a November 1983 friendly match against France, coming on as a second-half substitute for Zlatko Kranjčar. It remained his sole international appearance.
