= Dragan Božović =

Bosnian-Herzegovinian footballer

Personal information
- Full name: Dragan Božović
- Date of birth: 10 January 1961 (age 65)
- Place of birth: Trnovo, SFR Yugoslavia
- Position: Defender

Youth career
- Sarajevo

Senior career*
| Years | Team | Apps | (Gls) |
| 1980–1989 | Sarajevo | 137 | (3) |
| 1989–1993 | Apollon Pontus | 68 | (1) |
| Total | | 205 | (4) |
- * Club domestic league appearances and goals

Dragan Božović (Serbian Cyrillic: Драган Божовић, 10 January 1961) is a Bosnian and Yugoslav retired footballer who played as a defender.

== Playing career ==
Born in the town of Trnovo, Božović is a graduate of the FK Sarajevo youth academy. He had his official debut for the first team in an UEFA Cup tie versus Hamburger SV at the Koševo City Stadium. He mostly played the position of right back or halfback. In his first two seasons with the club, he only made eight appearances, before becoming a first-team regular in the second half of the 1982-83 season. He was an integral part of the 1984-85 championship-winning team. He left Sarajevo in January 1989, moving to Greek side Apollon Pontus, where he played for four years, before retiring in 1993.

== Personal life ==
His younger brother Boban was also a professional footballer.
