= Irfan Handžić =

Bosnian footballer and manager

Personal information
- Full name: Irfan Handžić
- Date of birth: 1 October 1956 (age 70)
- Place of birth: Sarajevo, FPR Yugoslavia
- Height: 1.86 m (6 ft 1 in)
- Position: Goalkeeper

Youth career
- 1968–1975: FK Sarajevo

Senior career*
Years	Team	Apps	(Gls)
1975–1977	Unis Vogošća	84	(0)
1977–1982	Sarajevo	116	(0)
1983–1987	Mersin İdman Yurdu	76	(0)
1987–1988	Adana Demirspor	31	(0)
Total		307	(0)

Managerial career
- 2000–2003: Sarajevo (Youth team)
- 2003: Čelik Zenica
- 2003–2005: Sarajevo (Youth team)
- 2006: Denizlispor (Assistant manager)
- 2010–2013: Al Jahra (Youth team)
- 2014–2016: Sarajevo (Youth team)
- 2016–2018: Sarajevo (Goalkeeping coach)
- * Club domestic league appearances and goals

Irfan Handžić (born 1 October 1956) is a retired Bosnian professional football goalkeeper and manager.

== Playing career ==
=== Club ===
He spent the majority of his playing career with Sarajevo, before transferring to the Turkish Süper Lig.

== Managerial career ==
As a manager, he worked in Turkey, Kuwait and his native Bosnia. He was most recently the goalkeeping coach of Sarajevo.
