= Ante Rajković =

Bosnian-Herzegovina footballer

Personal information
- Date of birth: 17 August 1952 (age 74)
- Place of birth: Jardol, Vitez, FPR Yugoslavia
- Position: Defender

Senior career*
Years	Team	Apps	(Gls)
–1972	Vitez		
1973–1981	FK Sarajevo	197	(2)
1981–1983	Swansea City	75	(2)
1983	FK Sarajevo	4	(0)
1983–1985	Swansea City	5	(0)

International career
1977–1978	Yugoslavia	6	(0)
- * Club domestic league appearances and goals

Ante Rajković (born 17 August 1952 in Jardol village near Vitez, PR Bosnia and Herzegovina, FPR Yugoslavia) is a Bosnian-Herzegovinian defender who played for SFR Yugoslavia.

== International career ==
He made his debut for Yugoslavia in a June 1977 friendly match away against Brazil and has earned a total of 6 caps, scoring no goals. His final international was a May 1978 friendly against Italy.
