= Miloš Đurković =

Personal information
- Full name: Miloš Đurković
- Date of birth: 29 February 1956 (age 70)
- Place of birth: Sarajevo, FPR Yugoslavia
- Position: Goalkeeper

Youth career
- Glasinac Sokolac

Senior career*
| Years | Team | Apps | (Gls) |
| 1977–1986 | Sarajevo | 140 | (0) |
| 1986–1987 | Beşiktaş | 35 | (0) |
| 1987–1988 | Sarajevo | 6 | (0) |
| 1988–1989 | Adana Demirspor | 24 | (0) |
| Total | | 205 | (0) |

Managerial career
- 1992: Republika Srpska
- 1998–1999: Glasinac Sokolac
- 2001–2002: Glasinac Sokolac
- 2005: Glasinac Sokolac
- * Club domestic league appearances and goals

Miloš Đurković (born 29 February 1956) is a Bosnian Serb former football goalkeeper and manager who played for clubs in the former Yugoslavia and Turkey. He is known locally as Faks.

== Playing career ==
=== Club ===
Born in Sarajevo, Đurković began playing football for local side FK Glasinac Sokolac. In 1977, he joined Yugoslav First League side FK Sarajevo. He spent nine seasons with the club, winning the 1984-85 championship.

Đurković joined Turkish Süper Lig side Beşiktaş J.K. in 1986. He returned to Yugoslavia to play the next season with Sarajevo, before joining Süper Lig side Adana Demirspor in 1988.

== Managerial career ==
In 1992, he was appointed manager of the Republika Srpska official football team for its first match.

After retiring from playing football, Đurković became a goalkeeping coach and was appointed manager of FK Glasinac Sokolac on three occasions.

He returned to FK Sarajevo as a goalkeeping coach, and worked there for couple of years, mainly between 2005 and 2012.
