= Edim Hadžialagić =

Bosnian-Herzegovina footballer

Personal information
- Full name: Edim Hadžialagić
- Date of birth: February 8, 1962 (age 64)
- Place of birth: Sarajevo, PR Bosnia and Herzegovina, FPR Yugoslavia
- Position: Defender

Senior career*
Years	Team	Apps	(Gls)
1980–1985	Sarajevo	85	(10)
1985–1987	Čelik Zenica	47	(2)
1988–1991	Željezničar	81	(6)
1991–1992	Maribor	34	(2)
1992–1996	Olimpija	97	(13)
Total		344	(33)
- * Club domestic league appearances and goals

Edim Hadžialagić (born February 8, 1962, in Sarajevo) is a former Bosnian-Herzegovinian football player.

== Club career ==
On the club level, he played for Sarajevo, Čelik Zenica, Željezničar Sarajevo, Maribor and Olimpija Ljubljana. With the latter he won three league titles and a domestic cup and played in the 1992–93 UEFA Champions League against Italian giants AC Milan.
