= Agim Nikolić =

Personal information
- Full name: Agim Nikolić
- Date of birth: 26 July 1958 (age 68)
- Place of birth: Sarajevo, FPR Yugoslavia
- Position: Midfielder

Youth career
- 1968–1977: Sarajevo

Senior career*
Years	Team	Apps	(Gls)
1977–1984	Sarajevo	46	(1)
1985	Liria Prizren	9	(0)
1985–1986	Rad	18	(1)
1987–1989	Pelister	28	(3)
Total		101	(5)

Managerial career
- 1996–1999: Sarajevo (youth)
- 1999: Sarajevo
- 1999–2003: Sarajevo (youth)
- 2003–2004: Sarajevo
- 2005–2019: Sarajevo (youth)
- * Club domestic league appearances and goals

Agim Nikolić (Albanian: Agim Nikoliq; born 26 July 1958) is a former Yugoslav and Bosnian professional footballer, football manager and youth football development professional.

== Playing career ==
Nikolić started his playing career with Yugoslav First League side FK Sarajevo, making 46 official appearances during seven seasons before being waved by the club. He went on to compete for a further five seasons in the second tier of Yugoslav football.

== Managerial career ==
After the conclusion of the Bosnian War, Nikolić became a football manager. Along with managing the senior team on two separate occasions, he dedicated his professional life to youth development and spent nearly 30 years coaching various FK Sarajevo youth teams.
