= Nijaz Ferhatović =

Bosnian-Herzegovinian footballer

Personal information
- Date of birth: 12 March 1955 (age 71)
- Place of birth: Sarajevo, FPR Yugoslavia
- Position: Defender

Senior career*
Years	Team	Apps	(Gls)
1972–1984	FK Sarajevo	208	(20)
1984–1986	VÖEST Linz	27	(1)

International career
1982	Yugoslavia	2	(0)
- * Club domestic league appearances and goals

Nijaz Ferhatović (born 12 March 1955 in Sarajevo, FPR Yugoslavia) is a retired Bosnian-Herzegovinian defender who played for SFR Yugoslavia.

== International career ==
He made his debut for Yugoslavia in a November 1982 European Championship qualification match away against Bulgaria and earned a total of 2 caps, scoring no goals. His second and final international was another December 1982 European Championship qualification match against Wales.
