= Slobodan Janjuš =

Yugoslav and Bosnian footballer

Personal information
- Full name: Slobodan Janjuš
- Date of birth: January 7, 1952 (age 74)
- Place of birth: Sarajevo, FPR Yugoslavia
- Position: Goalkeeper

Senior career*
Years	Team	Apps	(Gls)
1970–1977	Željezničar	185	(0)
1977–1978	Vojvodina	11	(0)
1978–1979	Radnički Pirot	30	(0)
1979–1981	Sarajevo	53	(0)
1981	Olimpija Ljubljana	17	(0)
1982–1983	Sarajevo	52	(0)
1984	Dinamo Zagreb	11	(0)
1984–1985	Sutjeska Nikšić	12	(0)
1985–1988	Željezničar	62	(0)
1993	Mqabba	7	(0)
1993–1994	Valletta	10	(0)
Total		420	(0)
- * Club domestic league appearances and goals

Slobodan "Čobo" Janjuš (born January 7, 1952) is a Yugoslav and Bosnian retired footballer who played as a goalkeeper.

Čobo gained a legendary status in his hometown Sarajevo, while playing for both Sarajevo clubs, a bitter city rivals, FK "Željo" and FK Sarajevo. He played a record 21 games in the Sarajevo derby.

== Club career ==
Janjuš represented a number of domestic clubs, having played with all of them, beside Second League Radnički Pirot, in the Yugoslav First League, namely, Željezničar Sarajevo, Vojvodina, FK Sarajevo (for whom he played 122 official games), Olimpija Ljubljana, Dinamo Zagreb and Sutjeska Nikšić.

He won the Yugoslav First League in the 1971–72 season with Željezničar.

He played a record 21 games in the Sarajevo derby. Furthermore, he is also third on the list of All time top appearances in Yugoslav First League, with 403 appearances while playing on various occasions between 1970 and 1985 for FK Željezničar, FK Sarajevo, FK Vojvodina, NK Olimpija Ljubljana, NK Dinamo Zagreb, FK Sutjeska Nikšić.

Janjuš also played in Malta and Germany. He was the oldest player to debut in the Maltese Premier League, being 41 years and 248 days old when he started for Mqabba against Birkirkara on 12 September 1993.

== International career ==
Janjuš has also represented Yugoslavia national team at youth levels.

== Post-playing career ==
Since the early 1990s Janjuš has been living in the United States. Usually referred to as "Bobby" in the U.S., he worked as goalkeeping coach with MLS' Tampa Bay Mutiny.

In 2008, he was appointed as the new goalkeeping coach at the newly established Tampa Bay Rowdies of the NASL. With the Rowdies, Bobby trained than USF goalkeeper Jeff Attinella. Attinella developed his skills under Bobby and became NASL best goalkeeper which eventually grabbed MLS's Real Salt Lake's attention who bought Attinella's contract. Bobby also coached youth teams across the county and has developed a youth female goalkeeper that represented the United States in a U-16 game.

Janjuš additionally owns a number of local businesses including a bar which is filled with mementos and memorabilia from his football playing career.

== Legacy ==
Despite living in the United States for many years, Čobo maintained a strong bond with his hometown of Sarajevo and his country, Bosnia and Herzegovina, where he is still loved and respected. In his native Sarajevo, Čobo became a legend despite playing for both Sarajevo clubs, FK "Željo" and FK Sarajevo, which have been fierce city rivals throughout history, including the Yugoslav First League and the Bosnian Premier League.

Čobo played a record 21 games in the Sarajevo derby (16 for Željezničar, 5 for Sarajevo), more than any other player. He was famous for his acrobatic goalkeeping style and technique, expressed through shot-stopping while "diving" towards the ball in the air, while "flying" in an extended dive, involving one or both hands in saves.

In 2023, Federalna TV made a half an hour long documentary film about him, titled "Čobo - Slobodan Janjuš".

== Personal life ==
While an active footballer, Janjuš had relationships with table tennis player Erzsebet Palatinus, while playing for Vojvodina, and singer Izvorinka Milošević.

After moving to the United States, Janjuš met a woman of Serbian origin, Susanne Ferry, and after more than two decades of living together they were married in Las Vegas in 2016 and spent their honeymoon in Sarajevo. His daughter Martina attended UNLV and currently resides in Las Vegas.

On 6 December 2009, Janjuš was arrested for domestic battery by the St. Petersburg Police.

== Honours ==
Željezničar Sarajevo

- Yugoslav First League: 1971–72
