= Predrag Pašić =

Bosnian footballer

Personal information
- Full name: Predrag Pašić
- Date of birth: 18 October 1958 (age 68)
- Place of birth: Sarajevo, PR Bosnia-Herzegovina, FPR Yugoslavia
- Height: 1.81 m (5 ft 11 1/2 in)
- Positions: Attacking midfielder; forward

Youth career
- –1976: Sarajevo

Senior career*
Years	Team	Apps	(Gls)
1975–1985	Sarajevo	203	(46)
1985–1987	VfB Stuttgart	46	(7)
1987–1988	TSV 1860 Munich	4	(1)
Total		253	(54)

International career
1979	Yugoslavia Olympic	5	(2)
1981–1985	Yugoslavia	10	(1)
Medal record
Men's Football
Representing Yugoslavia
Mediterranean Games
Gold medal – first place	1979 Split	Team
- * Club domestic league appearances and goals

Predrag Pašić (born 18 October 1958) is a Bosnian retired professional footballer who played as an attacking midfielder or as a forward.

== Club career ==
During his career, he played for hometown club Sarajevo and German clubs VfB Stuttgart and TSV 1860 Munich. Pašić won the 1984–85 Yugoslav First League with Sarajevo and that same season was named Yugoslav First League Player of the Season.

== International career ==
Pašić played for the Yugoslavia Olympic team, winning a gold medal at the 1979 Mediterranean Games. He made his senior debut for Yugoslavia in a March 1981 friendly match against Bulgaria and has earned a total of 10 caps, scoring 1 goal. He was a non-playing squad member at the 1982 FIFA World Cup and his final international was a March 1985 World Cup qualification match against Luxembourg.

== Career statistics ==
=== Club ===
Club	Season	League	League		Cup		Continental		Total	
Club	Season	League	Apps	Goals	Apps	Goals	Apps	Goals	Apps	Goals
Sarajevo	1975–76	Yugoslav First League	4	0	0	0	—		4	0
Sarajevo	1976–77	Yugoslav First League	1	0	0	0	—		1	0
Sarajevo	1977–78	Yugoslav First League	11	0	2	0	—		13	0
Sarajevo	1978–79	Yugoslav First League	27	5	1	0	—		28	5
Sarajevo	1979–80	Yugoslav First League	33	5	3	1	—		36	6
Sarajevo	1980–81	Yugoslav First League	28	5	1	0	2	2	31	7
Sarajevo	1981–82	Yugoslav First League	31	12	2	3	—		33	15
Sarajevo	1982–83	Yugoslav First League	12	2	1	2	4	4	17	7
Sarajevo	1983–84	Yugoslav First League	16	7	1	0	—		17	6
Sarajevo	1984–85	Yugoslav First League	33	9	1	0	—		34	9
Sarajevo	1985–86	Yugoslav First League	7	1	0	0	2	0	9	1
Sarajevo	Total		203	46	12	6	8	6	223	58
VfB Stuttgart	1985–86	Bundesliga	22	5	5	1	—		27	6
VfB Stuttgart	1986–87	Bundesliga	24	2	0	0	1	0	25	2
VfB Stuttgart	Total		46	7	5	1	1	0	52	8
TSV 1860 Munich	1987–88	Bayernliga	4	1	—		—		4	1
Career total			253	54	17	7	9	6	279	67

=== International ===
National team	Year	Apps	Goals
Yugoslavia	1981	5	1
Yugoslavia	1982	1	0
Yugoslavia	1983	0	0
Yugoslavia	1984	0	0
Yugoslavia	1985	4	0
Total		10	1

=== International goals ===
Scores and results table. Yugoslavia's goal tally first:

#	Date	Venue	Opponent	Score	Result	Competition
1	21 November 1981	Novi Sad, Yugoslavia	Luxembourg	4–0	5–0	1982 World Cup qualifier

== Honours ==
=== Player ===
Sarajevo

- Yugoslav First League: 1984–85

Yugoslavia Olympic

- Mediterranean Games: 1979

=== Individual ===
Awards

- Yugoslav First League Player of the Season: 1984–85
