= Husref Musemić =

Bosnian football manager (born 1961)

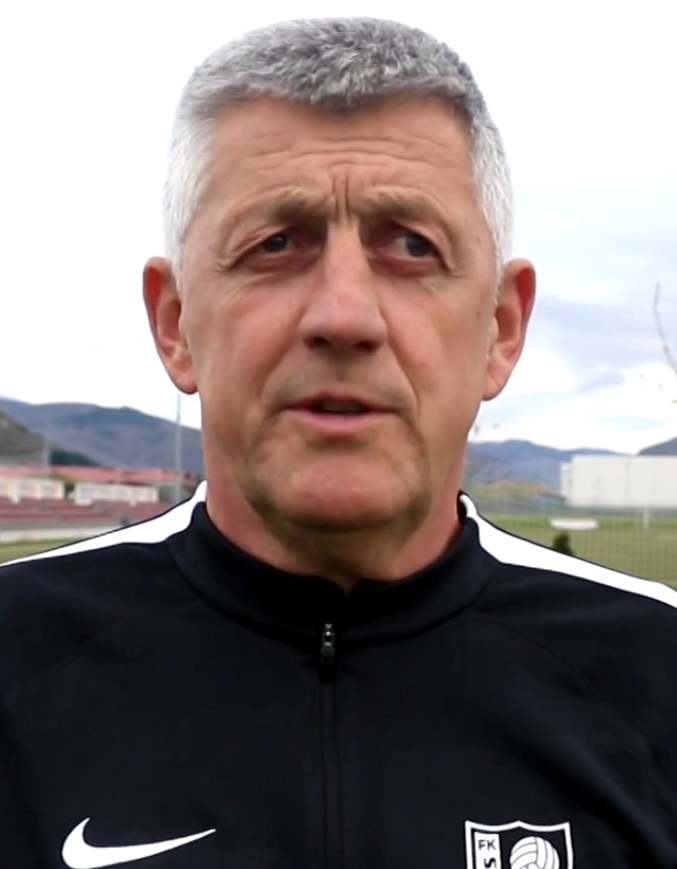
- Musemić with Sarajevo in 2019

Personal information
- Date of birth: 4 July 1961 (age 65)
- Place of birth: Janja, FPR Yugoslavia
- Height: 1.86 m (6 ft 1 in)
- Position: Striker

Senior career*
Years	Team	Apps	(Gls)
1977–1979	Radnik Bijeljina	28	(3)
1979–1985	Sarajevo	118	(47)
1985–1989	Red Star Belgrade	87	(26)
1989	Hearts	6	(3)
1990	Sarajevo	26	(9)
1991	Twente	10	(0)
1992	FC VVV	0	(0)
1992–1994	Pfullendorf	32	(16)
Total		307	(104)

International career
1983	Yugoslavia	1	(0)
1995	Bosnia and Herzegovina	1	(0)

Managerial career
- 1999–2000: Đerzelez
- 2001: Sarajevo
- 2002–2003: Sarajevo
- 2004: Čelik Zenica
- 2005–2008: Sarajevo
- 2008–2009: Olimpik
- 2011–2012: Bosnia and Herzegovina U18
- 2012–2013: Olimpik
- 2013: Sarajevo
- 2015–2016: Sloboda Tuzla
- 2016–2017: Mladost Doboj Kakanj
- 2017–2019: Sarajevo
- 2021–2022: Tuzla City
- 2022–2023: Igman Konjic
- 2024: Igman Konjic
- 2025: Sarajevo
- * Club domestic league appearances and goals

Husref Musemić (born 4 July 1961) is a Bosnian professional football manager and former player. Regarded as one of the most successful Bosnian football managers, he is FK Sarajevo's most decorated manager.

== Club career ==
Born in the town of Janja, near Bijeljina, SR Bosnia and Herzegovina, SFR Yugoslavia, Musemić began his career playing at local club Radnik Bijeljina, which played in the Yugoslav Second League group West. In 1979, he joined Yugoslav First League side FK Sarajevo, where he played for 6 seasons. He was an important member of the memorable Sarajevo squad that won the 1984–85 Yugoslav First League, which earned him a move that summer to Red Star Belgrade.

In Belgrade, Musemić represented the red & whites for the following four seasons, winning another Yugoslav First League title in the 1987–88 season.

He moved abroad in summer of 1989 to join Hearts in Scotland, but he only played the first half of the 1989–90 Scottish Premier Division, though scoring a derby winner against Hibernian in August 1989, though, to cement his place in Hearts' history books.

During the winter break he returned to Yugoslavia and joined his former club, FK Sarajevo. By then, Sarajevo had already lost many of the championship winning squad of 1985, so a year later, Musemić moved abroad again, this time to the Netherlands by joining Twente. He played nine games in the second half of the 1990–91 Eredivisie season, but in the following season he only managed to play one match, so he spent the second part of the season playing with FC VVV. He however played no official games for them.

Before retiring, Musemić played in Germany between 1992 and 1994 with SC Pfullendorf in the Oberliga Baden-Württemberg where he got the chance to show his scoring skills by netting 16 times in 32 matches. He finished his playing career after the end of that season at the age of 33.

== International career ==
Musemić made his debut and played his only match for the Yugoslavia national team in a friendly match played in Timișoara, Romania, on 30 March 1983, in a Yugoslav victory of 2–0 against Romania.

Later, after the break-up of Yugoslavia, in 1995, he played in the first half of the first ever official match of the Bosnia and Herzegovina national team, away against Albania.

== Managerial career ==
=== Early career ===
After retiring from playing, Musemić began his managerial career. Initially, he worked at Sarajevo as an assistant to managers Mehmed Janjoš and Nermin Hadžiahmetović. Afterwards he managed Đerzelez in the late 1990s, before becoming Sarajevo's main manager and winning the 2004–05 Bosnian Cup and two years later, the 2006–07 Bosnian Premier League.

After Sarajevo, Musemić managed Olimpik, with whom he won the 2008–09 First League of FBiH and got them promoted to the Bosnian Premier League. He also managed Sloboda Tuzla and Mladost Doboj Kakanj. While at Sloboda, Musemić also had good success, finishing 2nd in the 2015–16 Premier League season and being the 2015–16 Bosnian Cup runner-up.

In between his two appointments at Olimpik, from 29 June 2011 until 2012, he was head coach of the Bosnia and Herzegovina U18 national team.

=== Return to Sarajevo ===
In August 2017, for the fifth time in his career, Musemić was appointed manager of Sarajevo. In November 2017, he overtook Miroslav Brozović as Sarajevo's manager with the most wins in the club's history. In the 2018–19 season, he had for a second time in his career won the Bosnian Cup after Sarajevo beat Široki Brijeg in the final on 15 May 2019.

Just three days after the cup success, on 18 May 2019, Musemić led Sarajevo to a 4–0 home league win against Zvijezda 09 and won the league title with Sarajevo once again and also won the club's first ever double in history, as well as also the first double ever in his managerial career. On 23 May 2019, he was given the Bosnian Premier League Manager of the Season award for the 2018–19 season. On 12 June 2019, he extended his contract with Sarajevo, which was due to keep him at the club until the summer of 2021.

On 2 December 2019, Musemić got sacked from his position of Sarajevo manager after an underwhelming performance of his team in its 3–1 home league loss against fierce city rivals Željezničar in the Sarajevo derby two days earlier, on 30 November. It was that same season in which Željezničar also beat Sarajevo 5–2 at home on the Grbavica Stadium on 31 August 2019, with Musemić getting most of the blame for the team's loss.

=== Tuzla City ===
On 7 January 2021, it was announced that Musemić had become the new manager of Tuzla City, signing a two-and-a-half-year contract with the club. In his first game in charge, Tuzla City beat city rivals Sloboda in a league match on 28 February 2021.

Musemić oversaw his first loss as Tuzla City manager against his former Sarajevo, in a semi-final cup game on 7 April 2021. He left the club by mutual consent on 10 April 2022, following a string of poor results.

=== Igman Konjic ===
On 22 December 2022, Musemić was appointed manager of relegation threatened Igman Konjic. He was victorious in his first match in charge, as Igman won 3–1 against Željezničar on 25 February 2023.

Musemić suffered his first defeat on 11 March 2023, losing 3–0 at home in a match against Zrinjski Mostar. He finished the season with the side in eighth place, managing to avoid relegation. On 27 July 2023, it was announced by Igman that Musemić had left the club by mutual consent, two days before the start of the new season.

=== Return to Igman Konjic ===
On 22 June 2024, Igman Konjic announced Musemić's return to the club as manager. His first competitive game back in charge of Igman ended in a 1–0 away loss to Posušje on 4 August 2024. After a 7–1 away defeat to Zrinjski Mostar on 21 October 2024, he verbally attacked and threatened the game's referee observer. Following the incident, Musemić was fined and banned from working in Bosnian football for a period of six months. He ultimately resigned as Igman manager on 6 November 2024.

=== Sixth stint at Sarajevo ===
On 10 August 2025, Musemić was appointed Sarajevo manager for a record sixth time, following the departure of Zoran Zekić. Sarajevo was victorious in his first game back, defeating Posušje 2–1 at home on 16 August. Sarajevo then lost 5–1 to Borac on 24 August, its largest ever defeat against the Banja Luka-based side. In Musemić's first Sarajevo derby back, his side lost to rivals Željezničar 2–0 away on 27 September 2025. On 29 September, he left the club by mutual consent, with Sarajevo losing all five of their away games and sitting in seventh place with only three points above the relegation zone.

== Personal life ==
Musemić's older brother, Vahidin, was also a professional footballer, and is one of Sarajevo's greatest ever players.

== Managerial statistics ==
As of match played 27 September 2025

Managerial record by team and tenure
Team	From	To	Record							
Team	From	To	G	W	D	L	GF	GA	GD	Win %
Sarajevo	1 July 2002	14 September 2003	44	20	14	10	90	53	+37	45.45
Sarajevo	1 January 2005	17 June 2008	92	50	16	26	145	90	+55	54.35
Olimpik	4 October 2008	26 August 2009	27	15	5	7	41	27	+14	55.56
Olimpik	20 September 2012	10 February 2013	9	5	2	2	12	6	+6	55.56
Sarajevo	19 March 2013	1 December 2013	35	19	11	5	60	27	+33	54.29
Sloboda Tuzla	15 January 2015	11 September 2016	64	37	14	13	95	53	+42	57.81
Mladost Doboj Kakanj	27 September 2016	1 June 2017	27	9	7	11	49	45	+4	33.33
Sarajevo	26 August 2017	2 December 2019	96	57	17	22	186	88	+98	59.38
Tuzla City	7 January 2021	10 April 2022	47	21	15	11	70	56	+14	44.68
Igman Konjic	22 December 2022	27 July 2023	14	5	5	4	22	16	+6	35.71
Igman Konjic	22 June 2024	6 November 2024	13	5	1	7	12	27	−15	38.46
Sarajevo	10 August 2025	29 September 2025	7	3	0	4	7	12	−5	42.86
Total			475	246	107	122	789	500	+289	51.79

== Honours ==
=== Player ===
Sarajevo

- Yugoslav First League: 1984–85

Red Star Belgrade

- Yugoslav First League: 1987–88

=== Manager ===
Sarajevo

- Bosnian Premier League: 2006–07, 2018–19
- Bosnian Cup: 2004–05, 2018–19; runner-up: 2000–01

Olimpik

- First League of FBiH: 2008–09

Sloboda Tuzla

- Bosnian Cup runner-up: 2015–16

Individual

- Bosnian Premier League Manager of the Season: 2018–19
