= Nihad Milak =

Bosnian-Herzegovinian footballer

Personal information
- Full name: Nihad Milak
- Date of birth: 22 October 1958 (age 68)
- Place of birth: Sarajevo, FPR Yugoslavia
- Position: Defender

Senior career*
Years	Team	Apps	(Gls)
1976–1989	FK Sarajevo	222	(2)
- * Club domestic league appearances and goals

Nihad Milak (born October 22, 1958) is a retired Bosnian footballer. During his senior career he played only for FK Sarajevo.
