= Mirza Kapetanović =

Bosnian-Herzegovina footballer

Personal information
- Date of birth: 30 June 1959 (age 67)
- Place of birth: Sarajevo, FPR Yugoslavia
- Position: Defender

Senior career*
| Years | Team | Apps | (Gls) |
| 1979–1988 | FK Sarajevo | 207 | (2) |
| 1988–1990 | Kickers Offenbach | 57 | (5) |
| 1990-1991 | Wismut Aue | 9 | (3) |

International career
| 1983–1985 | Yugoslavia | 6 | (0) |
- * Club domestic league appearances and goals

Mirza Kapetanović (born 30 June 1959) is a Bosnian-Herzegovinian defender who played for FK Sarajevo and SFR Yugoslavia.

== Club career ==
He was a member of the memorable Sarajevo squad that won the 1984–85 Yugoslav First League.

== International career ==
He made his debut for Yugoslavia in a June 1983 friendly match against Romania and has earned a total of 6 caps, scoring no goals. His final international was a November 1985 FIFA World Cup qualification match away against France.
