= Davor Jozić =

Bosnian footballer (born 1960)

Personal information
- Date of birth: 22 September 1960 (age 66)
- Place of birth: Konjic, PR Bosnia and Herzegovina, FPR Yugoslavia
- Height: 1.81 m (5 ft 11 in)
- Position: Defender

Senior career*
Years	Team	Apps	(Gls)
1979–1987	Sarajevo	169	(15)
1987–1993	Cesena	170	(3)
1993–1994	Club América	11	(0)
1995–1996	Spezia	11	(0)
Total		361	(18)

International career
1984–1991	Yugoslavia	27	(2)
- * Club domestic league appearances and goals

Davor Jozić (born 22 September 1960) is a Bosnian retired footballer.

== Club career ==
Jozić started his career playing for hometown club Igman Konjic and then moved to Sarajevo where he played in 450 games. He was a member of the memorable Sarajevo squad that won the 1984–85 Yugoslav First League. After that, Jozić played for such clubs as Cesena, Club América, and Spezia.

== International career ==
Jozić made his debut for Yugoslavia in a September 1984 friendly match away against Scotland. He earned a total of 27 caps, scoring two goals.

Jozić played in 5 matches at the 1990 FIFA World Cup in Italy, where he scored two goals in the group stage: one headed goal against eventual tournament winners West Germany in a 4–1 defeat and the only goal against Colombia in a 1–0 Yugoslavia win. His final international was a May 1991 European Championship qualification match against Denmark.

== Later years ==
Davor Jozić served as assistant coach alongside Fabrizio Castori's assistant coach at Cesena. Jozić is a family man, having married and raising two children. He has chosen to make Cesena his home, where he continues to reside to the present day.

== Honours ==
Sarajevo

- Yugoslav First League: 1984–85
