= Senad Merdanović =

Bosnian footballer

Personal information
- Date of birth: 7 August 1961 (age 65)
- Place of birth: Kakanj, FPR Yugoslavia
- Positions: Midfielder; winger

Senior career*
Years	Team	Apps	(Gls)
1979–1989	FK Sarajevo		
1989–1990	Kickers Offenbach	5	(1)
1990–1991	FK Sarajevo	4	(0)

International career
	Yugoslavia U21	14	(8)
- * Club domestic league appearances and goals

Senad Merdanović (born 7 August 1961) is a retired Bosnian professional footballer. He was a member of the FK Sarajevo squad that won the Yugoslav First League in 1985. In August 2006 he was named the Director of football of FK Sarajevo, a position he held until 2010.

== Personal life ==
His brother Nijaz Merdanović was also a notable member of FK Sarajevo, and later club chairman.

== Honours ==
Sarajevo

- Yugoslav First League: 1984–85
