= Mehmed Janjoš =

Bosnian footballer and manager (born 1957)

Personal information
- Date of birth: 5 August 1957 (age 69)
- Place of birth: Sarajevo, FPR Yugoslavia
- Position: Midfielder

Youth career
- –1976: Sarajevo

Senior career*
| Years | Team | Apps | (Gls) |
| 1976–1977 | Vratnik | | |
| 1977–1985 | Sarajevo | 194 | (18) |
| 1985–1987 | Hércules | 9 | (1) |
| 1987–1988 | Sarajevo | 28 | (0) |
| 1988–1989 | Adana Demirspor | 27 | (2) |
| Total | | 258 | (21) |

Managerial career
- 1997–1998: Sarajevo
- 2001–2003: Al-Sahel
- 2004–2005: Al-Sahel
- 2008: Jedinstvo Bihać
- 2008–2010: Sarajevo
- 2010–2011: Olimpik
- 2013: Jedinstvo Bihać
- 2015: Jedinstvo Bihać
- 2016–2017: Sarajevo
- * Club domestic league appearances and goals

Mehmed Janjoš (born 5 August 1957) is a Bosnian professional football manager and former player.

== Playing career ==
Born in Sarajevo, SR Bosnia and Herzegovina, SFR Yugoslavia, Janjoš began playing football for local side Sarajevo. He spent eight seasons with the club, winning the Yugoslav First League in the 1984–85 season.

The following season, he moved to Spain to play in La Liga with Hércules. Janjoš went back to Sarajevo after two years in Spain. In 1988 he went to Adana Demirspor in Turkey where he finished his career in 1990.

== Managerial career ==
After retiring from playing football, Janjoš became a manager and enjoyed success with Sarajevo during the 1997–98 season when he led Sarajevo to victory in the Bosnian Cup and only narrowly missed out on the title.

In 1999, he was appointed assistant coach to Faruk Hadžibegić for Bosnia and Herzegovina's UEFA Euro 2000 qualifying campaign.

After Bosnia and Herzegovina, Janjoš was an assistant coach to Hadžibegić in Turkish clubs Gaziantepspor in 2005, Diyarbakırspor in 2006 and Denizlispor also in 2006.

Between 2008 and 2011, he managed Jedinstvo Bihać (2008), Sarajevo (2008–2010) and Olimpik (2010–2011). In the 2009–10 UEFA Europa League season, Janjoš led Sarajevo to the play-off round where the club lost to CFR Cluj 2–3 on aggregate.

During 2013 and 2015, he was for a second and third time the manager of Jedinstvo Bihać in the First League of FBiH.

On 29 August 2016, Janjoš was appointed manager of Sarajevo for a third time. He was given the Bosnian Premier League Manager of the Season award for the 2016–17 season. He left the club after a home league loss against Zrinjski Mostar 1–2 on 23 July 2017.

After Faruk Hadžibegić became the new Montenegro national team head coach on 25 July 2019, in August 2019 it was announced that Janjoš took over the position of Hadžibegić's assistant coach in the national team. After Hadžibegić was let go by the Montenegrin FA on 28 December 2020, Janjoš left the national team.

Following Hadžibegić's appointment as head coach of the Bosnia and Herzegovina national team, Janjoš was once again named as his assistant in January 2023.

== Personal life ==
Janjoš's son Emir also played for Sarajevo.

== Honours ==
=== Player ===
Sarajevo

- Yugoslav First League: 1984–85

=== Manager ===
Sarajevo

- Bosnian Cup: 1997–98; runner-up: 2016–17
- Bosnian Supercup: 1997

Individual

- Bosnian Premier League Manager of the Season: 2016–17
