= Faruk Hadžibegić =

Bosnian footballer and manager (born 1957)

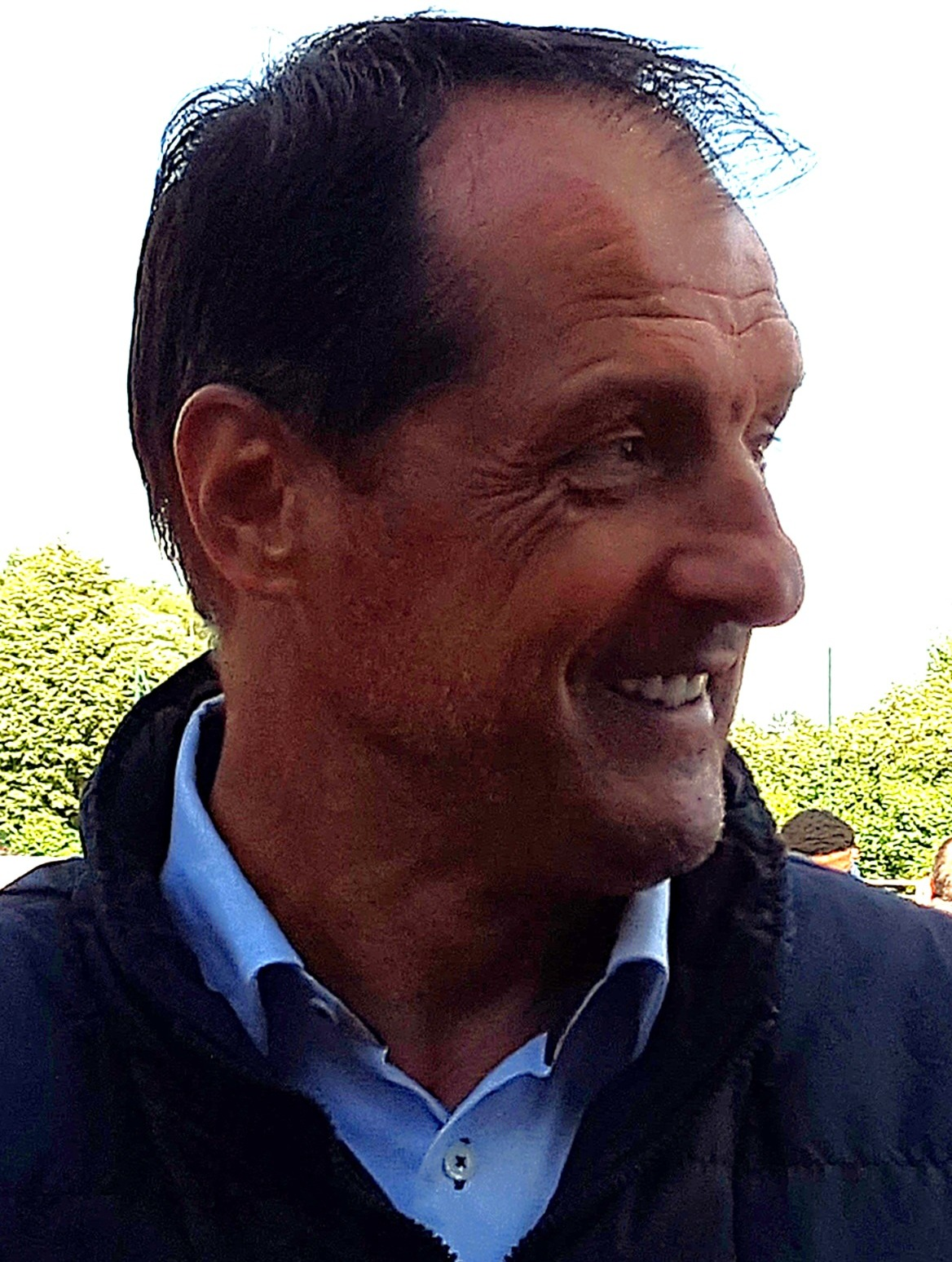
- Hadžibegić in 2016

Personal information
- Date of birth: 7 October 1957 (age 69)
- Place of birth: Sarajevo, PR Bosnia and Herzegovina, Yugoslavia
- Height: 1.83 m (6 ft 0 in)
- Position: Sweeper

Youth career
- 1966–1976: Sarajevo

Senior career*
Years	Team	Apps	(Gls)
1976–1985	Sarajevo	241	(25)
1985–1987	Real Betis	75	(8)
1987–1994	Sochaux	242	(16)
1994–1995	Toulouse	8	(0)
Total		566	(49)

International career
1982–1992	Yugoslavia	61	(6)

Managerial career
- 1996–1998: Sochaux
- 1999: Bosnia and Herzegovina
- 2000: Real Betis
- 2003–2004: Troyes
- 2005: Gaziantepspor
- 2006: Diyarbakırspor
- 2006: Denizlispor
- 2007: Chamois Niortais
- 2007–2009: Dijon
- 2009–2010: Bastia
- 2010–2011: Arles-Avignon
- 2016–2017: Valenciennes
- 2018–2019: Red Star
- 2019–2020: Montenegro
- 2022: MC Alger
- 2023: Bosnia and Herzegovina
- * Club domestic league appearances and goals

Faruk Hadžibegić (pronounced [fǎ:ruk xadʒiběːgitɕ]; born 7 October 1957) is a Bosnian professional football manager and former player who played as a defender. He played for Yugoslavia at UEFA Euro 1984 and at the 1990 FIFA World Cup. With 61 international caps, Hadžibegić is Yugoslavia's fifth-most-capped player.

== Club career ==
During his career, Hadžibegić played for hometown club Sarajevo, Real Betis, Sochaux and Toulouse. He was an important member of the memorable Sarajevo squad that won the 1984–85 Yugoslav First League. At Sochaux he played for years alongside compatriot Mehmed Baždarević.

== International career ==
Hadžibegić is the second most-capped Bosnian player and fifth overall most-capped player for the Yugoslavia national team (61 caps) - first being Zlatko Vujović, who is second overall (70 caps). He made his debut for them in an October 1982 European Championship qualification match away against Norway.

Hadžibegić was a participant in the 1990 FIFA World Cup in Italy for Yugoslavia, appearing in all five of his team's matches. Yugoslavia went on to face Argentina in the quarter-finals, where after a 0–0 draw in regulation and extra time, elimination was decided on a penalty shoot-out. Dragan Stojković, Dragoljub Brnović and Hadžibegić missed an opportunity to score from a penalty, as Stojković missed the first completely, while Sergio Goycochea stopped the fourth by Brnović and final attempt by Hadžibegić, thus sending the Yugoslav team home.

Hadžibegić featured regularly and played his last match for Yugoslavia in March 1992, a friendly game against the Netherlands.

== Managerial career ==
Hadžibegić began his managerial career with his former club Sochaux with whom he gained promotion to Ligue 1 in 1997. He was then manager of the Bosnia and Herzegovina national team. In 2000, Hadžibegić took over Real Betis, with whom he gained promotion to La Liga in 2001. He came back to France with Troyes, before stints in Turkey with Gaziantepspor, Diyarbakırspor and Denizlispor.

Hadžibegić then joined Chamois Niortais. He was named manager of Dijon in December 2007, and was released in June 2009. On 9 December 2009, after sacking coach Philippe Anziani, Bastia named Hadžibegić as the club's new manager. He left the club in 2010. From 2010 to 2011, he managed Arles-Avignon and later Valenciennes, from 2016 until 2017.

In October 2018, Hadžibegić replaced Régis Brouard as Red Star manager in Ligue 2. On 25 March 2019, after a series of poor results, he left Red Star.

On 25 July 2019, it was announced that Hadžibegić became the new manager of the Montenegro national team. The next day, on 26 July, at a press conference, it was revealed that he signed a one-and-a-half-year contract with the team, keeping him manager at least until the end of 2020. He was sacked by the Montenegrin FA on 28 December 2020. On 16 July 2022, Hadžibegić became the new manager of Algerian side MC Alger. On 10 September 2022, he left MC Alger after three games as manager.

In January 2023, Hadžibegić returned to managing the Bosnia and Herzegovina national team, replacing the outgoing Ivaylo Petev. He was tasked with qualifying the team for UEFA Euro 2024. Hadžibegić was victorious in the team's opening qualifying match against Iceland on 23 March 2023. He suffered his first defeat since returning on 26 March, in the second qualifying game against Slovakia. After two more qualifying game defeats against Portugal and Luxembourg, he mutually terminated his contract with the Bosnian FA on 23 June 2023.

== Administrative career ==
From 25 December 2002 until 18 February 2004, Hadžibegić held the role of the 29th President of the Assembly of FK Sarajevo.

== Career statistics ==
Scores and results list Yugoslavia's goal tally first, score column indicates score after each Hadžibegić goal.

List of international goals scored by Faruk Hadžibegić
No.	Date	Venue	Opponent	Score	Result	Competition
1	25 January 1985	Maharaja's College Stadium, Kochi, India	Soviet Union	1–1	2–1	Friendly
2	4 April 1985	Maharaja's College Stadium, Kochi, India	Soviet Union	1–1	1–2	Friendly
3	14 October 1987	Grbavica Stadium, Sarajevo, Yugoslavia	Northern Ireland	3–0	3–0	UEFA Euro 1988 qualifying
4	16 December 1987	Alsancak Stadium, İzmir, Turkey	Turkey	3–0	3–2	UEFA Euro 1988 qualifying
5	11 December 1988	Rajko Mitić Stadium, Belgrade, Yugoslavia	Cyprus	3–0	4–0	1990 FIFA World Cup qualification
6	11 October 1989	Koševo, Sarajevo, Yugoslavia	Norway	1–0	1–0	1990 FIFA World Cup qualification

== Managerial statistics ==
As of match played 20 June 2023

Team	From	To	Record				
Team	From	To	G	W	D	L	Win %
Sochaux	1 July 1996	4 October 1998	87	31	22	34	35.63
Bosnia and Herzegovina	10 March 1999	9 October 1999	7	2	2	3	28.57
Real Betis	1 May 2000	30 June 2000	3	2	0	1	66.67
Troyes	3 January 2003	30 June 2004	61	19	16	26	31.15
Gaziantepspor	1 August 2005	15 December 2005	18	7	6	5	38.89
Diyarbakırspor	15 March 2006	15 May 2006	9	2	1	6	22.22
Denizlispor	7 June 2006	22 December 2006	16	3	6	7	18.75
Chamois Niortais	13 February 2007	30 May 2007	14	6	5	3	42.86
Dijon	23 December 2007	30 June 2009	65	24	17	24	36.92
Bastia	9 December 2009	30 June 2010	21	8	5	8	38.10
Arles-Avignon	1 October 2010	23 November 2011	47	6	15	26	12.77
Valenciennes	15 January 2016	25 September 2017	69	21	23	25	30.43
Red Star	29 October 2018	24 March 2019	20	5	5	10	25.00
Montenegro	1 September 2019	28 December 2020	14	6	4	4	42.86
MC Alger	16 July 2022	10 September 2022	3	0	2	1	0.00
Bosnia and Herzegovina	4 January 2023	23 June 2023	4	1	0	3	25.00
Total			458	143	129	186	31.22

== Honours ==
=== Player ===
Sarajevo

- Yugoslav First League: 1984–85

Sochaux

- French Division 2: 1987–88 (Group A)

== Bibliography ==
- Gigi Riva (2016). L'ultimo rigore di Faruk. Una storia di calcio e di guerra [Faruk's Last Penalty. A story about football and war] (in Italian). Palermo: Sellerio. ISBN 978-8838935640.
