= 1987–88 FK Sarajevo season =

Sarajevo
1987–88 season
- Sporting director: Svetozar Vujović
- President: Mile Markić; Nedeljko Despotović
- Manager: Denijal Pirić
- Stadium: Koševo City Stadium
- Yugoslav First League: 14th
- Yugoslav Cup: Quarter-finals
- Top goalscorer: League: Dragan Jakovljević (11); All: Dragan Jakovljević (12)
- Highest home attendance: 30,000 vs Red Star (20 April 1988)
- Lowest home attendance: 1,000 vs Vardar (9 December 1987)
- Average home league attendance: 7,235
- Biggest win: Sarajevo 4–0 Vardar (20 September 1987)
- Biggest defeat: Hajduk 5–1 Sarajevo (25 October 1987)

The 1987–88 Sarajevo season was the club's 41st season in history, and their 39th season in the top flight of Yugoslav football, the Yugoslav First League. Besides competing in the First League, the team competed in the National Cup.

== Squad information ==
=== First-team squad ===
Note: Flags indicate national team as defined under FIFA eligibility rules; some limited exceptions apply. Players may hold more than one non-FIFA nationality.

No.	Pos.	Nation	Player
—	GK	YUG	Miloš Đurković
—	GK	YUG	Enver Lugušić
—	DF	YUG	Nijaz Arnaut
—	DF	YUG	Dragan Božović
—	DF	YUG	Aleksandar Guzina
—	DF	YUG	Mirza Kapetanović (Vice-captain)
—	DF	YUG	Predrag Koprivica
—	DF	YUG	Nihad Milak (Captain)
—	DF	YUG	Miloš Nedić
—	DF	YUG	Edin Omanović
—	DF	YUG	Ferid Radeljaš
—	DF	YUG	Dejan Raičković
—	DF	YUG	Risto Vidaković
—	MF	YUG	Samir Abdurahmanović
—	MF	YUG	Boban Božović

No.	Pos.	Nation	Player
—	MF	YUG	Haris Jaganjac
—	MF	YUG	Mehmed Janjoš
—	MF	YUG	Dane Kuprešanin
—	MF	YUG	Igor Lazić
—	MF	YUG	Zoran Ljubičić
—	MF	YUG	Senad Merdanović
—	MF	YUG	Ranko Milić
—	MF	YUG	Željko Pustivuk
—	MF	YUG	Slaviša Vukičević
—	FW	YUG	Bernard Barnjak
—	FW	YUG	Midhat Gluhačević
—	FW	YUG	Dragan Jakovljević
—	FW	YUG	Simo Krunić
—	FW	YUG	Nermin Vazda

== Kit ==
Supplier	Sponsor
(England) Admiral	(Socialist Federal Republic of Yugoslavia) Jat Airways (Socialist Federal Republic of Yugoslavia) Gorenje

== Competitions ==
=== Overview ===
Competition	First match	Last match	Starting round	Final position	Record							
Competition	First match	Last match	Starting round	Final position	Pld	W	D	L	GF	GA	GD	Win %
Yugoslav First League	2 August 1987	12 June 1988	Matchday 1	14th	34	11	8	15	37	47	−10	32.35
Yugoslav Cup	12 August 1987	9 December 1987	Round of 32	Quarter-finals	5	3	1	1	8	7	+1	60.00
Total					39	14	9	16	45	54	−9	35.90

Source: Competitions

=== Yugoslav First League ===
==== League table ====
Pos	Team	Pld	W	D	L	GF	GA	GD	Pts	Qualification or relegation
12	Željezničar	34	8	14	12	38	44	−6	30	
13	Hajduk Split	34	8	14	12	40	50	−10	30	
14	Sarajevo	34	11	8	15	37	47	−10	30	
15	Rad	34	11	8	15	44	56	−12	30	Qualification for Intertoto Cup
16	Čelik	34	12	5	17	39	45	−6	29	

Source: rsssf.org
Rules for classification: 1) points; 2) goal difference; 3) number of goals scored.

==== Matches ====
2 August 1987 1	Sloboda	1–0	Sarajevo	Tuzla
		Report		Stadium: Tušanj City Stadium; Attendance: 3,000

9 August 1987 2	Željezničar	1–1	Sarajevo	Sarajevo
		Report		Stadium: Stadion Grbavica; Attendance: 16,000

16 August 1987 3	Sarajevo	0–0	Budućnost	Sarajevo
		Report		Stadium: Koševo City Stadium; Attendance: 6,000

23 August 1987 4	Vojvodina	3–0	Sarajevo	Novi Sad
		Report		Stadium: Stadion Vojvodine; Attendance: 10,000

6 September 1987 5	Sarajevo	0–1	Velež	Sarajevo
		Report		Stadium: Koševo City Stadium; Attendance: 8,000

13 September 1987 6	Čelik	2–0	Sarajevo	Zenica
		Report		Stadium: Bilino Polje Stadium; Attendance: 10,000

20 September 1987 7	Sarajevo	4–0	Vardar	Sarajevo
		Report		Stadium: Koševo City Stadium; Attendance: 4,000

27 September 1987 8	Red Star	3–0	Sarajevo	Belgrade
		Report		Stadium: Marakana Stadium; Attendance: 20,000

4 October 1987 9	Sarajevo	1–0	Rad	Sarajevo
		Report		Stadium: Koševo City Stadium; Attendance: 6,000

7 October 1987 10	Osijek	2–1	Sarajevo	Osijek
		Report		Stadium: Gradski Vrt Stadium; Attendance: 2,000

18 October 1987 11	Sarajevo	2–0	Sutjeska	Sarajevo
		Report		Stadium: Koševo City Stadium; Attendance: 2,000

25 October 1987 12	Hajduk	5–1	Sarajevo	Split
		Report		Stadium: Stadion Poljud; Attendance: 5,000

1 November 1987 13	Sarajevo	2–0	Priština	Sarajevo
		Report		Stadium: Koševo City Stadium; Attendance: 3,000

15 November 1987 14	Radnički	2–0	Sarajevo	Niš
		Report		Stadium: Čair Stadium; Attendance: 5,000

22 November 1987 15	Sarajevo	1–0	Dinamo	Sarajevo
		Report		Stadium: Koševo City Stadium; Attendance: 5,000

29 November 1987 16	Partizan	1–0	Sarajevo	Belgrade
		Report		Stadium: JNA Stadium; Attendance: 5,000

6 December 1987 17	Sarajevo	1–1	Rijeka	Sarajevo
		Report		Stadium: Koševo City Stadium; Attendance: 5,000

6 March 1988 18	Sarajevo	0–0	Sloboda	Sarajevo
		Report		Stadium: Koševo City Stadium; Attendance: 4,000

13 March 1988 19	Sarajevo	2–0	Željezničar	Sarajevo
		Report		Stadium: Koševo City Stadium; Attendance: 15,000

20 March 1988 20	Budućnost	0–0	Sarajevo	Podgorica
		Report		Stadium: Podgorica City Stadium; Attendance: 4,000

27 March 1988 21	Sarajevo	4–1	Vojvodina	Sarajevo
		Report		Stadium: Koševo City Stadium; Attendance: 3,000

3 April 1988 22	Velež	4–0	Sarajevo	Mostar
		Report		Stadium: Bijeli Brijeg Stadium; Attendance: 8,000

10 April 1988 23	Sarajevo	2–1	Čelik	Sarajevo
		Report		Stadium: Koševo City Stadium; Attendance: 5,000

17 April 1988 24	Vardar	0–0	Sarajevo	Skopje
		Report		Stadium: Gradski Stadion Skopje; Attendance: 8,000

20 April 1988 25	Sarajevo	0–0	Red Star	Sarajevo
		Report		Stadium: Koševo City Stadium; Attendance: 30,000

23 April 1988 26	Rad	3–2	Sarajevo	Belgrade
		Report		Stadium: Stadion Banjica; Attendance: 2,000

1 May 1988 27	Sarajevo	3–0	Osijek	Sarajevo
		Report		Stadium: Koševo City Stadium; Attendance: 3,000

4 May 1988 28	Sutjeska	3–1	Sarajevo	Nikšić
		Report		Stadium: Stadion kraj Bistrice; Attendance: 5,000

8 May 1988 29	Sarajevo	2–0	Hajduk	Sarajevo
		Report		Stadium: Koševo City Stadium; Attendance: 5,000

15 May 1988 30	Priština	5–2	Sarajevo	Pristina
		Report		Stadium: Pristina City Stadium; Attendance: 25,000

22 May 1988 31	Sarajevo	1–0	Radnički	Sarajevo
		Report		Stadium: Koševo City Stadium; Attendance: 4,000

29 May 1988 32	Dinamo	4–1	Sarajevo	Zagreb
		Report		Stadium: Stadion Maksimir; Attendance: 8,000

8 June 1988 33	Sarajevo	2–2	Partizan	Sarajevo
		Report		Stadium: Koševo City Stadium; Attendance: 15,000

12 June 1988 34	Rijeka	2–1	Sarajevo	Rijeka
		Report		Stadium: Stadion Kantrida; Attendance: 1,000

=== Yugoslav Cup ===
==== Round of 32 ====
12 August 1987	Dinamo Vinkovci	2–3	Sarajevo	Vinkovci
17:30 CEST (UTC+2)		Report		Stadium: Stadion Mladosti; Attendance: 2,500

==== Round of 16 ====
20 August 1987 First leg	Sarajevo	2–2	Hajduk Split	Sarajevo
19:00 CEST (UTC+2)		Report		Stadium: Koševo City Stadium; Attendance: 4,000

12 November 1987 Second leg	Hajduk Split	1–2 (3–4 agg.)	Sarajevo	Split
		Report		Stadium: Stadion Poljud; Attendance: 1,500

==== Quarter-finals ====
18 November 1987 First leg	Vardar	2–0	Sarajevo	Skopje
16:00 CET (UTC+1)		Report		Stadium: Gradski Stadion Skopje; Attendance: 6,000

9 December 1987 Second leg	Sarajevo	1–0 (1–2 agg.)	Vardar	Sarajevo
13:00 CET (UTC+1)		Report		Stadium: Koševo City Stadium; Attendance: 1,000
