= 1988–89 FK Sarajevo season =

Sarajevo
1988–89 season
- Sporting director: Svetozar Vujović
- President: Nedeljko Despotović; Kemal Hujić
- Manager: Denijal Pirić; Džemaludin Mušović
- Stadium: Koševo City Stadium
- Yugoslav First League: 13th
- Yugoslav Cup: Round of 16
- Top goalscorer: League: B. Barnjak 9 All: Bernard Barnjak (9)
- Highest home attendance: 15,000 vs Red Star (7 May 1989)
- Lowest home attendance: 1,000 vs Vojvodina (17 August 1988); 1,000 vs Radnički (14 December 1988)
- Average home league attendance: 5,353
- Biggest win: Sarajevo 4–1 Budućnost (25 September 1988)
- Biggest defeat: Partizan 6–1 Sarajevo (14 August 1988)

The 1988–89 Sarajevo season was the club's 42nd season in history, and their 40th season in the top flight of Yugoslav football, the Yugoslav First League. Besides competing in the First League, the team competed in the National Cup.

== Squad information ==
=== First-team squad ===
Note: Flags indicate national team as defined under FIFA eligibility rules; some limited exceptions apply. Players may hold more than one non-FIFA nationality.

No.	Pos.	Nation	Player
—	GK	YUG	Enver Lugušić
—	GK	YUG	Dragoslav Vukadin
—	DF	YUG	Srđan Bajić (5th captain)
—	DF	YUG	Dragan Božović
—	DF	YUG	Nudžein Geca
—	DF	YUG	Suad Golubić
—	DF	YUG	Aleksandar Guzina
—	DF	YUG	Nihad Milak (Captain)
—	DF	YUG	Miloš Nedić
—	DF	YUG	Edin Omanović
—	DF	YUG	Dejan Raičković
—	DF	YUG	Goran Šljivić
—	MF	YUG	Boban Božović (4th captain)
—	MF	YUG	Miodrag Ćirković

No.	Pos.	Nation	Player
—	MF	YUG	Haris Jaganjac
—	MF	YUG	Ivica Jozić
—	MF	YUG	Dane Kuprešanin
—	MF	YUG	Igor Lazić
—	MF	YUG	Zoran Ljubičić
—	MF	YUG	Senad Merdanović (Vice-captain)
—	MF	YUG	Ismet Mulavdić
—	MF	YUG	Slaviša Vukičević (3rd captain)
—	FW	YUG	Bernard Barnjak
—	FW	YUG	Midhat Gluhačević
—	FW	YUG	Davor Jakovljević
—	FW	YUG	Goran Kovačević
—	FW	YUG	Miralem Ramić
—	FW	YUG	Nermin Vazda

== Kit ==
Supplier	Sponsor
(Belgium) Patrick	(Socialist Federal Republic of Yugoslavia) Cedevita (Socialist Federal Republic of Yugoslavia) Kraš (Japan) Nissan; Ossa

== Competitions ==
=== Overview ===
Competition	First match	Last match	Starting round	Final position	Record							
Competition	First match	Last match	Starting round	Final position	Pld	W	D	L	GF	GA	GD	Win %
Yugoslav First League	7 August 1988	4 June 1989	Matchday 1	13th	34	11	10	13	35	42	−7	32.35
Yugoslav Cup	3 August 1988	31 August 1988	Round of 32	Round of 16	3	2	0	1	4	3	+1	66.67
Total					37	13	10	14	39	45	−6	35.14

Source: Competitions

=== Yugoslav First League ===
==== League table ====
Pos	Team	Pld	W	PKW	PKL	L	GF	GA	GD	Pts
11	Velež	34	13	2	2	17	42	43	−1	28
12	Sloboda Tuzla	34	11	6	6	11	35	42	−7	28
13	Sarajevo	34	11	6	4	13	35	42	−7	28
14	Budućnost	34	12	4	3	15	32	43	−11	28
15	Spartak Subotica	34	11	4	3	16	30	39	−9	26

Source: rsssf.org
Rules for classification: 1) points; 2) goal difference; 3) number of goals scored.

==== Matches ====
7 August 1988 1	Sarajevo	0–0 (1–2 p)	Vojvodina	Sarajevo
		Report		Stadium: Koševo City Stadium; Attendance: 4,000

14 August 1988 2	Partizan	6–1	Sarajevo	Belgrade
		Report		Stadium: JNA Stadium; Attendance: 12,000

21 August 1988 3	Sarajevo	1–1 (4–2 p)	Sloboda	Sarajevo
		Report		Stadium: Koševo City Stadium; Attendance: 4,000

28 August 1988 4	Sarajevo	0–1	Hajduk	Sarajevo
		Report		Stadium: Koševo City Stadium; Attendance: 7,000

3 September 1988 5	Dinamo	3–0	Sarajevo	Zagreb
		Report		Stadium: Stadion Maksimir; Attendance: 10,000

10 September 1988 6	Sarajevo	1–1 (4–2 p)	Napredak	Sarajevo
		Report		Stadium: Koševo City Stadium; Attendance: 3,000

18 September 1988 7	Osijek	0–3	Sarajevo	Osijek
		Report		Stadium: Gradski Vrt Stadium; Attendance: 4,000

25 September 1988 8	Sarajevo	4–1	Budućnost	Sarajevo
		Report		Stadium: Koševo City Stadium; Attendance: 3,000

2 October 1988 9	Vardar	2–2 (2–4 p)	Sarajevo	Skopje
		Report		Stadium: Gradski Stadion Skopje; Attendance: 6,000

9 October 1988 10	Sarajevo	0–0 (1–4 p)	Rad	Sarajevo
		Report		Stadium: Koševo City Stadium; Attendance: 5,000

22 October 1988 11	Red Star	3–1	Sarajevo	Belgrade
		Report		Stadium: Marakana Stadium; Attendance: 10,000

30 October 1988 12	Sarajevo	2–0	Željezničar	Sarajevo
		Report		Stadium: Koševo City Stadium; Attendance: 12,000

6 November 1988 13	Velež	1–0	Sarajevo	Mostar
		Report		Stadium: Bijeli Brijeg Stadium; Attendance: 3,000

27 November 1988 14	Sarajevo	1–2	Rijeka	Sarajevo
		Report		Stadium: Koševo City Stadium; Attendance: 1,500

4 December 1988 15	Spartak	4–2	Sarajevo	Subotica
		Report		Stadium: Subotica City Stadium; Attendance: 8,000

14 December 1988 16	Sarajevo	2–0	Radnički	Sarajevo
		Report		Stadium: Koševo City Stadium; Attendance: 1,000

18 December 1988 17	Čelik	2–0	Sarajevo	Zenica
		Report		Stadium: Bilino Polje Stadium; Attendance: 3,000

26 February 1989 18	Vojvodina	1–2	Sarajevo	Novi Sad
		Report		Stadium: Stadion Vojvodine; Attendance: 5,000

5 March 1989 19	Sarajevo	0–0 (4–5 p)	Partizan	Sarajevo
		Report		Stadium: Koševo City Stadium; Attendance: 12,000

12 March 1989 20	Sloboda	0–0 (4–5 p)	Sarajevo	Tuzla
		Report		Stadium: Tušanj City Stadium; Attendance: 3,000

19 March 1989 21	Hajduk	3–1	Sarajevo	Split
		Report		Stadium: Stadion Poljud; Attendance: 8,000

26 March 1989 22	Sarajevo	2–1	Dinamo	Sarajevo
		Report		Stadium: Koševo City Stadium; Attendance: 6,000

2 April 1989 23	Napredak	4–0	Sarajevo	Kruševac
		Report		Stadium: Mladost Stadium; Attendance: 10,000

9 April 1989 24	Sarajevo	0–0 (4–3 p)	Osijek	Sarajevo
		Report		Stadium: Koševo City Stadium; Attendance: 4,000

16 April 1989 25	Budućnost	2–0	Sarajevo	Podgorica
		Report		Stadium: Podgorica City Stadium; Attendance: 3,000

19 April 1989 26	Sarajevo	1–0	Vardar	Sarajevo
		Report		Stadium: Koševo City Stadium; Attendance: 3,000

3 May 1989 27	Rad	0–2	Sarajevo	Belgrade
		Report		Stadium: Stadion Banjica; Attendance: 2,000

7 May 1989 28	Sarajevo	1–1 (1–4 p)	Red Star	Sarajevo
		Report		Stadium: Koševo City Stadium; Attendance: 15,000

14 May 1989 29	Željezničar	2–1	Sarajevo	Sarajevo
		Report		Stadium: Stadion Grbavica; Attendance: 20,000

21 May 1989 30	Sarajevo	1–0	Velež	Sarajevo
		Report		Stadium: Koševo City Stadium; Attendance: 5,000

24 May 1989 31	Rijeka	0–0 (2–3 p)	Sarajevo	Rijeka
		Report		Stadium: Stadion Kantrida; Attendance: 2,000

28 May 1989 32	Sarajevo	1–0	Spartak	Sarajevo
		Report		Stadium: Koševo City Stadium; Attendance: 3,500

31 May 1989 33	Radnički	1–0	Sarajevo	Niš
		Report		Stadium: Čair Stadium; Attendance: 6,000

4 June 1989 34	Sarajevo	3–0	Čelik	Sarajevo
		Report		Stadium: Koševo City Stadium; Attendance: 2,000

=== Yugoslav Cup ===
==== Round of 32 ====
3 August 1988	Borac Travnik	1–3	Sarajevo	Turbe
17:00 CEST (UTC+2)		Report		Stadium: Sport Center Vlašić; Attendance: 2,500

==== Round of 16 ====
17 August 1988 First leg	Sarajevo	1–0	Vojvodina	Sarajevo
19:00 CEST (UTC+2)		Report		Stadium: Koševo City Stadium; Attendance: 1,000

31 August 1988 Second leg	Vojvodina	2–0 (2–1 agg.)	Sarajevo	Novi Sad
18:30 CEST (UTC+2)		Report		Stadium: Stadion Vojvodine; Attendance: 8,000
