= 1986–87 FK Sarajevo season =

Sarajevo
1986–87 season
- Sporting director: Svetozar Vujović
- President: Mile Markić
- Manager: Boško Antić; Denijal Pirić
- Stadium: Koševo City Stadium
- Yugoslav First League: 13th
- Yugoslav Cup: Round of 32
- Top goalscorer: League: Dragan Jakovljević (15); All: Dragan Jakovljević (16)
- Highest home attendance: 30,000 vs Željezničar (22 March 1987); 30,000 vs Partizan (7 June 1987)
- Lowest home attendance: 3,000 vs Rijeka (8 March 1987)
- Average home league attendance: 10,294
- Biggest win: Sarajevo 4–0 Priština (5 April 1987)
- Biggest defeat: Rijeka 5–2 Sarajevo (24 August 1986)

The 1986–87 Sarajevo season was the club's 40th season in history, and their 38th season in the top flight of Yugoslav football, the Yugoslav First League. Besides competing in the First League, the team competed in the National Cup.

== Squad information ==
=== First-team squad ===
Note: Flags indicate national team as defined under FIFA eligibility rules; some limited exceptions apply. Players may hold more than one non-FIFA nationality.

No.	Pos.	Nation	Player
—	GK	YUG	Enver Lugušić
—	GK	YUG	Dragan Talajić
—	GK	YUG	Dragoslav Vukadin
—	DF	YUG	Srđan Bajić
—	DF	YUG	Tomislav Bošnjak
—	DF	YUG	Dragan Božović
—	DF	YUG	Davor Jozić
—	DF	YUG	Goran Jurišić
—	DF	YUG	Mirza Kapetanović
—	DF	YUG	Predrag Koprivica
—	DF	YUG	Nihad Milak
—	DF	YUG	Miloš Nedić
—	DF	YUG	Ferid Radeljaš
—	DF	YUG	Dejan Raičković
—	MF	YUG	Boban Božović (Captain)

No.	Pos.	Nation	Player
—	MF	YUG	Muhidin Čoralić
—	MF	YUG	Haris Jaganjac
—	MF	YUG	Mehmed Janjoš
—	MF	YUG	Igor Lazić
—	MF	YUG	Senad Merdanović
—	MF	YUG	Željko Pustivuk
—	MF	YUG	Vladislav Stojanović
—	MF	YUG	Slaviša Vukičević (Captain)
—	FW	YUG	Bernard Barnjak
—	FW	YUG	Dragan Jakovljević
—	FW	YUG	Vladimir Petković
—	FW	YUG	Elfad Struga
9	FW	YUG	Zijad Švrakić
—	FW	YUG	Nermin Vazda

== Kit ==
Supplier	Sponsor
(England) Admiral	(Socialist Federal Republic of Yugoslavia) Jat Airways (Socialist Federal Republic of Yugoslavia) Gorenje

== Competitions ==
=== Overview ===
Competition	First match	Last match	Starting round	Final position	Record							
Competition	First match	Last match	Starting round	Final position	Pld	W	D	L	GF	GA	GD	Win %
Yugoslav First League	10 August 1986	14 June 1987	Matchday 1	13th	34	12	9	13	39	49	−10	35.29
Yugoslav Cup	12 August 1986		Round of 32	Round of 32	1	0	1	0	1	1	+0	0.00
Total					35	12	10	13	40	50	−10	34.29

Source: Competitions

=== Yugoslav First League ===
==== League table ====
Pos	Team	Pld	W	D	L	GF	GA	GD	Pts
11	Osijek	34	15	4	15	40	44	−4	34
12	Čelik Zenica	34	14	5	15	48	52	−4	33
13	Sarajevo	34	12	9	13	39	49	−10	33
14	Priština	34	11	7	16	35	48	−13	29
15	Sloboda Tuzla	34	9	10	15	38	44	−6	28

Source: rsssf.org
Rules for classification: 1) points; 2) goal difference; 3) number of goals scored.

==== Matches ====
10 August 1986 1	Sloboda	2–2	Sarajevo	Tuzla
		Report		Stadium: Tušanj City Stadium; Attendance: 5,000

17 August 1986 2	Sarajevo	0–1	Čelik	Sarajevo
		Report		Stadium: Koševo City Stadium; Attendance: 4,000

24 August 1986 3	Rijeka	5–2	Sarajevo	Rijeka
		Report		Stadium: Stadion Kantrida; Attendance: 1,500

31 August 1986 4	Sarajevo	1–1	Dinamo Zagreb	Sarajevo
		Report		Stadium: Koševo City Stadium; Attendance: 10,000

7 September 1986 5	Željezničar	4–1	Sarajevo	Sarajevo
		Report		Stadium: Stadion Grbavica; Attendance: 20,000

14 September 1986 6	Sarajevo	0–1	Osijek	Sarajevo
		Report		Stadium: Koševo City Stadium; Attendance: 5,000

21 September 1986 7	Priština	0–1	Sarajevo	Pristina
		Report		Stadium: Pristina City Stadium; Attendance: 12,000

27 September 1986 8	Sarajevo	2–1	Red Star	Sarajevo
		Report		Stadium: Koševo City Stadium; Attendance: 25,000

5 October 1986 9	Sutjeska	3–0	Sarajevo	Nikšić
		Report		Stadium: Stadion kraj Bistrice; Attendance: 5,000

12 October 1986 10	Sarajevo	1–0	Vardar	Sarajevo
		Report		Stadium: Koševo City Stadium; Attendance: 5,000

19 October 1986 11	Radnički	2–0	Sarajevo	Niš
		Report		Stadium: Čair Stadium; Attendance: 6,000

1 November 1986 12	Sarajevo	2–2	Hajduk	Sarajevo
		Report		Stadium: Koševo City Stadium; Attendance: 8,000

16 November 1986 13	Velež	2–0	Sarajevo	Mostar
		Report		Stadium: Bijeli Brijeg Stadium; Attendance: 10,000

23 November 1986 14	Spartak	0–0	Sarajevo	Subotica
		Report		Stadium: Subotica City Stadium; Attendance: 8,000

30 November 1986 15	Sarajevo	1–0	Dinamo Vinkovci	Sarajevo
		Report		Stadium: Koševo City Stadium; Attendance: 4,000

7 December 1986 16	Partizan	1–0	Sarajevo	Belgrade
		Report		Stadium: JNA Stadium; Attendance: 10,000

14 December 1986 17	Sarajevo	2–1	Budućnost	Sarajevo
		Report		Stadium: Koševo City Stadium; Attendance: 8,000

22 February 1987 18	Sarajevo	1–0	Sloboda	Sarajevo
		Report		Stadium: Koševo City Stadium; Attendance: 5,000

1 March 1987 19	Čelik	2–0	Sarajevo	Zenica
		Report		Stadium: Bilino Polje Stadium; Attendance: 18,000

8 March 1987 20	Sarajevo	0–0	Rijeka	Sarajevo
		Report		Stadium: Koševo City Stadium; Attendance: 3,000

15 March 1987 21	Dinamo Zagreb	4–0	Sarajevo	Zagreb
		Report		Stadium: Stadion Maksimir; Attendance: 10,000

22 March 1987 22	Sarajevo	1–1	Željezničar	Sarajevo
		Report		Stadium: Koševo City Stadium; Attendance: 30,000

29 March 1987 23	Osijek	2–1	Sarajevo	Osijek
		Report		Stadium: Gradski Vrt Stadium; Attendance: 2,000

5 April 1987 24	Sarajevo	4–0	Priština	Sarajevo
		Report		Stadium: Koševo City Stadium; Attendance: 6,000

12 April 1987 25	Red Star	2–3	Sarajevo	Belgrade
		Report		Stadium: Marakana Stadium; Attendance: 8,000

15 April 1987 26	Sarajevo	2–1	Sutjeska	Sarajevo
		Report		Stadium: Koševo City Stadium; Attendance: 6,000

19 April 1987 27	Vardar	3–2	Sarajevo	Skopje
		Report		Stadium: Gradski Stadion Skopje; Attendance: 15,000

3 May 1987 28	Sarajevo	2–1	Radnički	Sarajevo
		Report		Stadium: Koševo City Stadium; Attendance: 5,000

13 May 1987 29	Hajduk	1–2	Sarajevo	Split
		Report		Stadium: Stadion Poljud; Attendance: 30,000

17 May 1987 30	Sarajevo	1–1	Velež	Sarajevo
		Report		Stadium: Koševo City Stadium; Attendance: 15,000

24 May 1987 31	Sarajevo	3–1	Spartak	Sarajevo
		Report		Stadium: Koševo City Stadium; Attendance: 6,000

31 May 1987 32	Dinamo Vinkovci	2–0	Sarajevo	Vinkovci
		Report		Stadium: Stadion Mladosti; Attendance: 5,000

7 June 1987 33	Sarajevo	1–1	Partizan	Sarajevo
		Report		Stadium: Koševo City Stadium; Attendance: 30,000

14 June 1987 34	Budućnost	1–1	Sarajevo	Podgorica
		Report		Stadium: Podgorica City Stadium; Attendance: 3,000

=== Yugoslav Cup ===
==== Round of 32 ====
12 August 1986	Crvena Zastava	1–1 (4–2 p)	Sarajevo	Kragujevac
16:00 CEST (UTC+2)		Report		Stadium: Šumarice Stadium; Attendance: 3,500
