= 1976–77 FK Sarajevo season =

Sarajevo
1976–77 season
- Director general: Svetozar Vujović
- President: Ljubomir Grupković
- Manager: Vukašin Višnjevac
- Stadium: Koševo City Stadium
- Yugoslav First League: 16th
- Yugoslav Cup: Quarter-finals
- Highest home attendance: 20,000 vs Željezničar (12 September 1976); 20,000 vs Hajduk (31 October 1976)
- Lowest home attendance: 3,000 vs Borac (17 November 1976); 3,000 vs Zagreb (28 November 1976)
- Average home league attendance: 9,408
- Biggest win: Sarajevo 5–0 Željezničar (12 September 1976)
- Biggest defeat: Borac 6–2 Sarajevo (5 June 1977)

The 1976–77 Sarajevo season was the club's 30th season in history, and their 28th season in the top flight of Yugoslav football, the Yugoslav First League. Besides competing in the First League, the team competed in the National Cup.

== Squad information ==
=== First-team squad ===
Note: Flags indicate national team as defined under FIFA eligibility rules; some limited exceptions apply. Players may hold more than one non-FIFA nationality.

No.	Pos.	Nation	Player
—	GK	YUG	Fahrija Dautbegović
—	GK	YUG	Savo Ekmečić
—	DF	YUG	Nijaz Ferhatović
—	DF	YUG	Faruk Hadžibegić
—	DF	YUG	Zoran Lukić
—	DF	YUG	Nihad Milak
—	DF	YUG	Hamdo Radeljaš
—	DF	YUG	Ante Rajković
—	DF	YUG	Anđelko Tešan
—	DF	YUG	Nenad Vidaković
—	DF	YUG	Želimir Vidović
—	MF	YUG	Abdel Bešović
—	MF	YUG	Branko Bošnjak
—	MF	YUG	Enver Heto

No.	Pos.	Nation	Player
—	MF	YUG	Sead Hodžić
—	MF	YUG	Slobodan Lubura
—	MF	YUG	Nijaz Merdanović
—	MF	YUG	Predrag Pašić
—	MF	YUG	Denijal Pirić
—	MF	YUG	Dragoljub Simić (Captain)
—	MF	YUG	Safet Sušić
9	FW	YUG	Zlatko Dupovac
—	FW	YUG	Avdo Murga
—	FW	YUG	Agim Nikolić
—	FW	YUG	Srebrenko Repčić
—	FW	YUG	Radomir Savić
—	FW	YUG	Vladimir Vukadin

== Competitions ==
=== Overview ===
Competition	First match	Last match	Starting round	Final position	Record							
Competition	First match	Last match	Starting round	Final position	Pld	W	D	L	GF	GA	GD	Win %
Yugoslav First League	22 August 1976	19 June 1977	Matchday 1	16th	34	10	10	14	40	55	−15	29.41
Yugoslav Cup	14 October 1976	11 December 1976	Round of 32	Quarter-finals	3	2	0	1	7	4	+3	66.67
Total					37	12	10	15	47	59	−12	32.43

Source: Competitions

=== Yugoslav First League ===
==== League table ====
Pos	Team	Pld	W	D	L	GF	GA	GD	Pts	Qualification or relegation
14	Vojvodina	34	8	14	12	40	50	−10	30	Qualification for Intertoto Cup
15	OFK Belgrade	34	9	12	13	39	51	−12	30	
16	Sarajevo	34	10	10	14	40	55	−15	30	
17	Napredak Kruševac (R)	34	10	8	16	38	55	−17	28	Relegation to Yugoslav Second League
18	Željezničar (R)	34	8	10	16	33	53	−20	26	Relegation to Yugoslav Second League

Source: rsssf.org
Rules for classification: 1) points; 2) goal difference; 3) number of goals scored.
(R) Relegated

==== Matches ====
22 August 1976 1	Sarajevo	2–2	OFK Beograd	Sarajevo
		Report		Stadium: Grbavica Stadium; Attendance: 12,000

29 August 1976 2	Olimpija	2–2	Sarajevo	Ljubljana
		Report		Stadium: Bežigrad Stadium; Attendance: 15,000

1 September 1976 3	Sarajevo	0–2	Budućnost	Sarajevo
		Report		Stadium: Grbavica Stadium; Attendance: 8,000

5 September 1976 4	Radnički	4–2	Sarajevo	Niš
		Report		Stadium: Čair Stadium; Attendance: 10,000

12 September 1976 5	Sarajevo	5–0	Željezničar	Sarajevo
		Report		Stadium: Koševo City Stadium; Attendance: 20,000

19 September 1976 6	Čelik	0–0	Sarajevo	Zenica
		Report		Stadium: Bilino Polje Stadium; Attendance: 10,000

2 October 1976 7	Sarajevo	2–2	Dinamo	Sarajevo
		Report		Stadium: Koševo City Stadium; Attendance: 7,000

17 October 1976 8	Red Star	2–1	Sarajevo	Belgrade
		Report		Stadium: Marakana Stadium; Attendance: 5,000

24 October 1976 9	Sarajevo	1–1	Sloboda	Sarajevo
		Report		Stadium: Koševo City Stadium; Attendance: 9,938

27 October 1976 10	Vojvodina	3–0	Sarajevo	Novi Sad
		Report		Stadium: Stadion Vojvodine; Attendance: 6,000

31 October 1976 11	Sarajevo	3–1	Hajduk	Sarajevo
		Report		Stadium: Koševo City Stadium; Attendance: 20,000

6 November 1976 12	Rijeka	5–1	Sarajevo	Rijeka
		Report		Stadium: Kantrida Stadium; Attendance: 3,000

14 November 1976 13	Sarajevo	1–1	Napredak	Sarajevo
		Report		Stadium: Koševo City Stadium; Attendance: 7,000

17 November 1976 14	Sarajevo	2–0	Borac	Sarajevo
		Report		Stadium: Koševo City Stadium; Attendance: 3,000

21 November 1976 15	Velež	5–0	Sarajevo	Mostar
		Report		Stadium: Bijeli Brijeg Stadium; Attendance: 7,000

28 November 1976 16	Sarajevo	3–2	Zagreb	Sarajevo
		Report		Stadium: Koševo City Stadium; Attendance: 3,000

5 December 1976 17	Partizan	3–0	Sarajevo	Belgrade
		Report		Stadium: JNA Stadium; Attendance: 12,000

6 March 1977 18	OFK Beograd	2–1	Sarajevo	Belgrade
		Report		Stadium: Karaburma Stadium; Attendance: 10,000

13 March 1977 19	Sarajevo	2–0	Olimpija	Sarajevo
		Report		Stadium: Koševo City Stadium; Attendance: 8,000

20 March 1977 20	Budućnost	1–1	Sarajevo	Podgorica
		Report		Stadium: Podgorica City Stadium; Attendance: 7,000

27 March 1977 21	Sarajevo	1–0	Radnički	Sarajevo
		Report		Stadium: Koševo City Stadium; Attendance: 11,000

3 April 1977 22	Željezničar	3–0	Sarajevo	Sarajevo
		Report		Stadium: Grbavica Stadium; Attendance: 20,000

10 April 1977 23	Sarajevo	1–2	Čelik	Sarajevo
		Report		Stadium: Koševo City Stadium; Attendance: 4,000

16 April 1977 24	Dinamo	0–0	Sarajevo	Zagreb
		Report		Stadium: Maksimir Stadium; Attendance: 5,000

20 April 1977 25	Sarajevo	0–2	Red Star	Sarajevo
		Report		Stadium: Koševo City Stadium; Attendance: 18,000

24 April 1977 26	Sloboda	1–0	Sarajevo	Tuzla
		Report		Stadium: Tušanj City Stadium; Attendance: 4,000

18 May 1977 28	Hajduk	1–1	Sarajevo	Split
		Report		Stadium: Plinara Stadion; Attendance: 10,000

22 May 1977 29	Sarajevo	1–0	Rijeka	Sarajevo
		Report		Stadium: Koševo City Stadium; Attendance: 7,000

25 May 1977 27	Sarajevo	2–0	Vojvodina	Sarajevo
		Report		Stadium: Koševo City Stadium; Attendance: 5,000

29 May 1977 30	Napredak	0–1	Sarajevo	Kruševac
		Report		Stadium: Mladost Stadium; Attendance: 25,000

5 June 1977 31	Borac	6–2	Sarajevo	Banja Luka
		Report		Stadium: Banja Luka City Stadium; Attendance: 8,000

8 June 1977 32	Sarajevo	1–1	Velež	Sarajevo
		Report		Stadium: Koševo City Stadium; Attendance: 7,000

12 June 1977 33	Zagreb	0–1	Sarajevo	Zagreb
		Report		Stadium: Stadion Kranjčevićeva; Attendance: 6,000

19 June 1977 34	Sarajevo	0–1	Partizan	Sarajevo
		Report		Stadium: Koševo City Stadium; Attendance: 10,000

=== Yugoslav Cup ===
==== Round of 32 ====
14 October 1976	Sarajevo	2–1	Red Star	Sarajevo
14:00 CET (UTC+1)		Report		Stadium: Koševo City Stadium; Attendance: 8,000

==== Round of 16 ====
1 December 1976	Sarajevo	3–0	Partizan	Sarajevo
13:00 CET (UTC+1)		Report		Stadium: Koševo City Stadium; Attendance: 9,000

==== Quarter-finals ====
11 December 1976	Budućnost	3–2	Sarajevo	Podgorica
13:00 CET (UTC+1)		Report		Stadium: Podgorica City Stadium; Attendance: 5,000
