= 1985–86 FK Sarajevo season =

Sarajevo
1985–86 season
- Sporting director: Svetozar Vujović
- President: Mile Markić
- Manager: Boško Antić
- Stadium: Koševo City Stadium
- Yugoslav First League: 15th
- Yugoslav Cup: Round of 32
- European Cup: First Round
- Top goalscorer: League: Teskeredžić 13; All: Muhidin Teskeredžić (14)
- Highest home attendance: 30,000 vs Red Star (14 June 1986)
- Lowest home attendance: 2,000 vs Osijek (13 April 1986)
- Average home league attendance: 10,324
- Biggest win: Sarajevo 5–0 Čelik (9 October 1985)
- Biggest defeat: Hajduk 6–2 Sarajevo (30 March 1986)

The 1985–86 Sarajevo season was the club's 39th season in history, and their 37th season in the top flight of Yugoslav football, the Yugoslav First League. Besides competing in the First League, the team competed in the National Cup and the European Cup.

== Squad information ==
=== First-team squad ===
Note: Flags indicate national team as defined under FIFA eligibility rules; some limited exceptions apply. Players may hold more than one non-FIFA nationality.

No.	Pos.	Nation	Player
—	GK	YUG	Miloš Đurković
—	DF	YUG	Tomislav Bošnjak
—	DF	YUG	Dragan Božović
—	DF	YUG	Aleksandar Guzina
—	DF	YUG	Davor Jozić (3rd captain)
—	DF	YUG	Goran Jurišić
—	DF	YUG	Mirza Kapetanović
—	DF	YUG	Nihad Milak
—	DF	YUG	Ferid Radeljaš
—	DF	YUG	Dejan Raičković
—	MF	YUG	Boban Božović
—	MF	YUG	Mehmed Janjoš (Vice-captain)
—	MF	YUG	Dane Kuprešanin
—	MF	YUG	Zoran Ljubičić

No.	Pos.	Nation	Player
—	MF	YUG	Senad Merdanović
—	MF	YUG	Predrag Pašić (Captain)
—	MF	YUG	Ivica Vujičević
—	MF	YUG	Slaviša Vukičević
—	FW	YUG	Miloš Aničić
—	FW	YUG	Bernard Barnjak
—	FW	YUG	Dragan Jakovljević
—	FW	YUG	Siniša Jovanović
—	FW	YUG	Vladimir Petković
—	FW	YUG	Zijad Švrakić
—	FW	YUG	Muhidin Teskeredžić
—	FW	YUG	Nedim Tutić
—	FW	YUG	Nermin Vazda

== Kit ==
Supplier	Sponsor
(England) Admiral	(Socialist Federal Republic of Yugoslavia) Bosna Auto (Socialist Federal Republic of Yugoslavia) Kraš

== Competitions ==
=== Overview ===
Competition	First match	Last match	Starting round	Final position	Record							
Competition	First match	Last match	Starting round	Final position	Pld	W	D	L	GF	GA	GD	Win %
Yugoslav First League	11 August 1985	14 June 1986	Matchday 1	15th	34	11	8	15	41	46	−5	32.35
Yugoslav Cup	30 October 1985		Round of 32	Round of 32	1	0	0	1	0	1	−1	0.00
European Cup	18 September 1985	2 October 1985	First Round	First Round	2	0	0	2	2	4	−2	0.00
Total					37	11	8	18	43	51	−8	29.73

Source: Competitions

=== Yugoslav First League ===
==== League table ====
Pos	Team	Pld	W	D	L	GF	GA	GD	Pts	Qualification or relegation
13	Dinamo Vinkovci	34	11	8	15	51	54	−3	30	
14	Budućnost	34	13	4	17	47	52	−5	30	
15	Sarajevo	34	11	8	15	41	46	−5	30	
16	Čelik	34	11	8	15	39	49	−10	30	
17	OFK Belgrade (R)	34	12	6	16	48	63	−15	30	Relegation to Yugoslav Second League

Source: rsssf.org
Rules for classification: 1) points; 2) goal difference; 3) number of goals scored.
(R) Relegated

==== Matches ====
11 August 1985 1	Sarajevo	3–0	Vardar	Sarajevo
		Report		Stadium: Koševo City Stadium; Attendance: 7,000

18 August 1985 2	Budućnost	2–1	Sarajevo	Podgorica
		Report		Stadium: Podgorica City Stadium; Attendance: 6,000

21 August 1985 3	Sarajevo	3–1	Sutjeska	Sarajevo
		Report		Stadium: Koševo City Stadium; Attendance: 8,000

1 September 1985 5	Sarajevo	2–0	Hajduk	Sarajevo
		Report		Stadium: Koševo City Stadium; Attendance: 15,000

4 September 1985 6	Sarajevo	0–0	Velež	Sarajevo
		Report		Stadium: Koševo City Stadium; Attendance: 15,000

8 September 1985 7	Osijek	1–0	Sarajevo	Osijek
		Report		Stadium: Gradski Vrt Stadium; Attendance: 8,000

12 September 1985 4	Prishtina	2–1	Sarajevo	Pristina
		Report		Stadium: Pristina City Stadium; Attendance: 25,000

15 September 1985 8	Sarajevo	1–1	Partizan	Sarajevo
		Report		Stadium: Koševo City Stadium; Attendance: 25,000

6 October 1985 9	Vojvodina	1–0	Sarajevo	Novi Sad
		Report		Stadium: Stadion Vojvodine; Attendance: 5,000

9 October 1985 10	Sarajevo	5–0	Čelik	Sarajevo
		Report		Stadium: Koševo City Stadium; Attendance: 4,000

13 October 1985 11	Dinamo Vinkovci	1–1	Sarajevo	Vinkovci
		Report		Stadium: Stadion Mladosti; Attendance: 4,000

20 October 1985 12	Sarajevo	2–1	Rijeka	Sarajevo
		Report		Stadium: Koševo City Stadium; Attendance: 2,500

27 October 1985 13	Dinamo Zagreb	1–1	Sarajevo	Zagreb
		Report		Stadium: Stadion Maksimir; Attendance: 15,000

2 November 1985 14	Sarajevo	2–1	Željezničar	Sarajevo
		Report		Stadium: Koševo City Stadium; Attendance: 20,000

24 November 1985 15	Sloboda	1–0	Sarajevo	Tuzla
		Report		Stadium: Tušanj City Stadium; Attendance: 500

1 December 1985 16	Sarajevo	3–0	OFK Beograd	Sarajevo
		Report		Stadium: Koševo City Stadium; Attendance: 7,000

8 December 1985 17	Red Star	4–3	Sarajevo	Belgrade
		Report		Stadium: Marakana Stadium; Attendance: 35,000

2 March 1986 18	Vardar	2–1	Sarajevo	Skopje
		Report		Stadium: Skopje City Stadium; Attendance: 10,000

9 March 1986 19	Sarajevo	2–1	Budućnost	Sarajevo
		Report		Stadium: Koševo City Stadium; Attendance: 6,000

16 March 1986 20	Sutjeska	1–0	Sarajevo	Nikšić
		Report		Stadium: Stadion kraj Bistrice; Attendance: 7,000

23 March 1986 21	Sarajevo	3–1	Prishtina	Sarajevo
		Report		Stadium: Koševo City Stadium; Attendance: 10,000

30 March 1986 22	Hajduk	6–2	Sarajevo	Split
		Report		Stadium: Stadion Poljud; Attendance: 8,000

6 April 1986 23	Velež	1–1	Sarajevo	Mostar
		Report		Stadium: Stadion pod Bijelim Brijegom; Attendance: 12,000

13 April 1986 24	Sarajevo	2–2	Osijek	Sarajevo
		Report		Stadium: Koševo City Stadium; Attendance: 2,000

20 April 1986 25	Partizan	2–0	Sarajevo	Belgrade
		Report		Stadium: JNA Stadium; Attendance: 10,000

27 April 1986 26	Sarajevo	0–0	Vojvodina	Sarajevo
		Report		Stadium: Koševo City Stadium; Attendance: 5,000

4 May 1986 27	Čelik	2–0	Sarajevo	Zenica
		Report		Stadium: Bilino Polje Stadium; Attendance: 15,000

7 May 1986 28	Sarajevo	1–0	Dinamo Vinkovci	Sarajevo
		Report		Stadium: Koševo City Stadium; Attendance: 4,000

18 May 1986 29	Rijeka	2–0	Sarajevo	Rijeka
		Report		Stadium: Stadion Kantrida; Attendance: 6,000

25 May 1986 30	Sarajevo	0–0	Dinamo Zagreb	Sarajevo
		Report		Stadium: Koševo City Stadium; Attendance: 12,000

29 May 1986 31	Željezničar	3–0	Sarajevo	Sarajevo
		Report		Stadium: Stadion Grbavica; Attendance: 6,000

1 June 1986 32	Sarajevo	1–0	Sloboda	Sarajevo
		Report		Stadium: Koševo City Stadium; Attendance: 3,000

8 June 1986 33	OFK Beograd	2–0	Sarajevo	Belgrade
		Report		Stadium: Omladinski Stadium; Attendance: 8,000

14 June 1986 34	Sarajevo	0–4	Red Star	Sarajevo
		Report		Stadium: Koševo City Stadium; Attendance: 30,000

=== Yugoslav Cup ===
==== Round of 32 ====
30 October 1985	Rad	1–0	Sarajevo	Belgrade
13:30 CET (UTC+1)		Report		Stadium: Stadion Banjica; Attendance: 5,000

=== European Cup ===
==== First Round ====
18 September 1985 First leg	Kuusysi (Finland)	2–1	(Socialist Federal Republic of Yugoslavia) Sarajevo	Lahti, Finland
19:00 EEST (UTC+3)	Hudd 10'; Kousa 51'	Report	Teskeredžić 42'	Stadium: Lahden Stadion; Attendance: 2,000; Referee: Klaus Peschel (East Germany)

2 October 1985 Second leg	Sarajevo (Socialist Federal Republic of Yugoslavia)	1–2 (2–4 agg.)	(Finland) Kuusysi	Sarajevo, Yugoslavia
17:30 CEST (UTC+2)	Vukićević 32' (pen.)	Report	Lius 13', 15'	Stadium: Koševo City Stadium; Attendance: 9,000; Referee: Hristos Kolokithas (Greece)
