= 1977–78 FK Sarajevo season =

Sarajevo
1977–78 season
- Director general: Svetozar Vujović
- President: Ljubomir Grupković
- Manager: Fuad Muzurović
- Stadium: Koševo City Stadium
- Yugoslav First League: 9th
- Yugoslav Cup: Round of 16
- Highest home attendance: 30,000 vs Red Star (9 October 1977)
- Lowest home attendance: 3,000 four games
- Average home league attendance: 8,706
- Biggest win: Sarajevo 5–0 Borac (7 December 1977); Sarajevo 5–0 OFK Beograd (16 April 1978)
- Biggest defeat: Sarajevo 0–3 three games

The 1977–78 Sarajevo season was the club's 31st season in history, and their 29th season in the top flight of Yugoslav football, the Yugoslav First League. Besides competing in the First League, the team competed in the National Cup.

== Squad information ==
=== First-team squad ===
Note: Flags indicate national team as defined under FIFA eligibility rules; some limited exceptions apply. Players may hold more than one non-FIFA nationality.

No.	Pos.	Nation	Player
—	GK	YUG	Radoslav Bebić
—	GK	YUG	Miloš Đurković
—	GK	YUG	Sead Gruda
—	GK	YUG	Irfan Handžić
—	DF	YUG	Faruk Hadžibegić
—	DF	YUG	Zoran Lukić
—	DF	YUG	Nihad Milak
—	DF	YUG	Salko Nikšić
—	DF	YUG	Ante Rajković (Captain)
—	DF	YUG	Nenad Vidaković
—	DF	YUG	Želimir Vidović
—	MF	YUG	Abdel Bešović
—	MF	YUG	Branko Bošnjak

No.	Pos.	Nation	Player
—	MF	YUG	Hajrudin Buljetović
—	MF	YUG	Sead Hodžić
—	MF	YUG	Mehmed Janjoš
—	MF	YUG	Nijaz Merdanović
—	MF	YUG	Predrag Pašić
—	MF	YUG	Safet Sušić
—	MF	YUG	Edhem Šljivo (Captain)
—	FW	YUG	Zlatko Dupovac
—	FW	YUG	Predrag Kurteš
—	FW	YUG	Agim Nikolić
—	FW	YUG	Srebrenko Repčić
10	FW	YUG	Radomir Savić
—	FW	YUG	Fuad Sultanović

== Competitions ==
=== Overview ===
Competition	First match	Last match	Starting round	Final position	Record							
Competition	First match	Last match	Starting round	Final position	Pld	W	D	L	GF	GA	GD	Win %
Yugoslav First League	14 August 1977	28 May 1978	Matchday 1	9th	34	11	10	13	50	46	+4	32.35
Yugoslav Cup	7 September 1977	26 October 1977	Round of 32	Round of 16	2	1	0	1	3	4	−1	50.00
Total					36	12	10	14	53	50	+3	33.33

Source: Competitions

=== Yugoslav First League ===
==== League table ====
Pos	Team	Pld	W	D	L	GF	GA	GD	Pts	Qualification or relegation
7	Velež	34	13	9	12	42	43	−1	35	
8	Vojvodina	34	14	4	16	46	38	+8	32	Qualification for Intertoto Cup
9	Sarajevo	34	11	10	13	50	46	+4	32	
10	Olimpija	34	13	6	15	44	44	0	32	
11	Budućnost	34	12	7	15	41	51	−10	31	

Source: rsssf.org
Rules for classification: 1) points; 2) goal difference; 3) number of goals scored.

==== Matches ====
14 August 1977 1	Borac	2–1	Sarajevo	Banja Luka
		Report		Stadium: Banja Luka City Stadium; Attendance: 8,000

21 August 1977 2	Sarajevo	0–0	Rijeka	Sarajevo
		Report		Stadium: Koševo City Stadium; Attendance: 8,000

28 August 1977 3	Sloboda	3–1	Sarajevo	Tuzla
		Report		Stadium: Tušanj City Stadium; Attendance: 8,000

31 August 1977 4	Sarajevo	4–2	Velež	Sarajevo
		Report		Stadium: Koševo City Stadium; Attendance: 10,000

4 September 1977 5	Čelik	0–2	Sarajevo	Zenica
		Report		Stadium: Bilino Polje Stadium; Attendance: 15,000

11 September 1977 6	Sarajevo	3–1	Budućnost	Sarajevo
		Report		Stadium: Koševo City Stadium; Attendance: 12,000

18 September 1977 7	Hajduk	1–0	Sarajevo	Split
		Report		Stadium: Plinara Stadion; Attendance: 15,000

21 September 1977 8	Sarajevo	1–1	Dinamo	Sarajevo
		Report		Stadium: Koševo City Stadium; Attendance: 15,000

25 September 1977 9	OFK Beograd	2–0	Sarajevo	Belgrade
		Report		Stadium: Karaburma Stadium; Attendance: 4,000

9 October 1977 10	Sarajevo	1–3	Red Star	Sarajevo
		Report		Stadium: Koševo City Stadium; Attendance: 30,000

12 October 1977 11	Trepça	1–0	Sarajevo	Kosovska Mitrovica
		Report		Stadium: Trepça Stadium; Attendance: 16,000

15 October 1977 12	Sarajevo	2–0	Vojvodina	Sarajevo
		Report		Stadium: Koševo City Stadium; Attendance: 3,000

23 October 1977 13	Osijek	2–0	Sarajevo	Osijek
		Report		Stadium: Gradski Vrt Stadium; Attendance: 10,000

30 October 1977 14	Radnički	1–1	Sarajevo	Niš
		Report		Stadium: Čair Stadium; Attendance: 5,000

6 November 1977 15	Sarajevo	2–1	Olimpija	Sarajevo
		Report		Stadium: Koševo City Stadium; Attendance: 4,000

19 November 1977 16	Zagreb	0–0	Sarajevo	Zagreb
		Report		Stadium: Stadion Kranjčevićeva; Attendance: 1,200

4 December 1977 17	Sarajevo	1–1	Partizan	Sarajevo
		Report		Stadium: Koševo City Stadium; Attendance: 12,000

7 December 1977 18	Sarajevo	5–0	Borac	Sarajevo
		Report		Stadium: Koševo City Stadium; Attendance: 3,000

5 March 1978 19	Rijeka	2–2	Sarajevo	Rijeka
		Report		Stadium: Kantrida Stadium; Attendance: 9,876

12 March 1978 20	Sarajevo	2–1	Sloboda	Sarajevo
		Report		Stadium: Koševo City Stadium; Attendance: 12,000

18 March 1978 21	Velež	2–1	Sarajevo	Mostar
		Report		Stadium: Bijeli Brijeg Stadium; Attendance: 4,000

26 March 1978 22	Sarajevo	3–1	Čelik	Sarajevo
		Report		Stadium: Koševo City Stadium; Attendance: 10,000

2 April 1978 23	Budućnost	3–0	Sarajevo	Podgorica
		Report		Stadium: Podgorica City Stadium; Attendance: 12,000

9 April 1978 24	Sarajevo	0–3	Hajduk	Sarajevo
		Report		Stadium: Koševo City Stadium; Attendance: 10,000

12 April 1978 25	Dinamo	3–3	Sarajevo	Zagreb
		Report		Stadium: Maksimir Stadium; Attendance: 7,000

16 April 1978 26	Sarajevo	5–0	OFK Beograd	Sarajevo
		Report		Stadium: Koševo City Stadium; Attendance: 3,000

22 April 1978 27	Red Star	2–1	Sarajevo	Belgrade
		Report		Stadium: Marakana Stadium; Attendance: 10,000

26 April 1978 28	Sarajevo	2–1	Trepça	Sarajevo
		Report		Stadium: Koševo City Stadium; Attendance: 5,000

30 April 1978 29	Vojvodina	2–0	Sarajevo	Novi Sad
		Report		Stadium: Stadion Vojvodine; Attendance: 7,000

7 May 1978 30	Sarajevo	4–1	Osijek	Sarajevo
		Report		Stadium: Koševo City Stadium; Attendance: 4,000

10 May 1978 31	Sarajevo	1–1	Radnički	Sarajevo
		Report		Stadium: Koševo City Stadium; Attendance: 3,000

13 May 1978 32	Olimpija	2–1	Sarajevo	Ljubljana
		Report		Stadium: Bežigrad Stadium; Attendance: 1,500

21 May 1978 33	Sarajevo	1–1	Zagreb	Sarajevo
		Report		Stadium: Koševo City Stadium; Attendance: 4,000

28 May 1978 34	Partizan	0–0	Sarajevo	Belgrade
		Report		Stadium: JNA Stadium; Attendance: 50,000

=== Yugoslav Cup ===
==== Round of 32 ====
7 September 1977	Sarajevo	3–1	Budućnost	Sarajevo
16:00 CET (UTC+2)		Report		Stadium: Koševo City Stadium; Attendance: 7,000

==== Round of 16 ====
26 October 1977	Zagreb	3–0	Sarajevo	Zagreb
14:00 CET (UTC+1)		Report		Stadium: Stadion Kranjčevićeva; Attendance: 3,000
