= 1981–82 FK Sarajevo season =

Sarajevo
1981–82 season
- Director general: Svetozar Vujović
- President: Duško Cvijetić
- Manager: Fuad Muzurović; Srboljub Markušević; Boško Prodanović
- Stadium: Koševo City Stadium; Grbavica Stadium
- Yugoslav First League: 4th
- Yugoslav Cup: Round of 16
- Highest home attendance: 55,000 vs Željezničar (10 March 1982)
- Lowest home attendance: 2,000 vs Teteks (14 April 1982)
- Average home league attendance: 14,000
- Biggest win: Sarajevo 6–1 Rijeka (14 February 1982)
- Biggest defeat: Red Star 5–1 Sarajevo (31 March 1982)

The 1981–82 Sarajevo season was the club's 35th season in history, and their 33rd season in the top flight of Yugoslav football, the Yugoslav First League. Besides competing in the First League, the team competed in the National Cup.

== Squad information ==
=== First-team squad ===
Note: Flags indicate national team as defined under FIFA eligibility rules; some limited exceptions apply. Players may hold more than one non-FIFA nationality.

No.	Pos.	Nation	Player
—	GK	YUG	Miloš Đurković
—	GK	YUG	Irfan Handžić
1	GK	YUG	Slobodan Janjuš
—	DF	YUG	Dragan Božović
—	DF	YUG	Nijaz Ferhatović
—	DF	YUG	Faruk Hadžibegić
—	DF	YUG	Davor Jozić
—	DF	YUG	Mirza Kapetanović
—	DF	YUG	Zoran Lukić
—	DF	YUG	Nihad Milak
—	DF	YUG	Ferid Radeljaš
—	DF	YUG	Dragan Tomašević
—	DF	YUG	Nenad Vidaković
4	DF	YUG	Želimir Vidović
—	MF	YUG	Boban Božović
—	MF	YUG	Dušan Đurić
—	MF	YUG	Edim Hadžialagić

No.	Pos.	Nation	Player
—	MF	YUG	Mehmed Janjoš
—	MF	YUG	Senad Melić
—	MF	YUG	Nijaz Merdanović
—	MF	YUG	Senad Merdanović
—	MF	YUG	Ramo Muhić
—	MF	YUG	Besim Nikolić
—	MF	YUG	Predrag Pašić
—	MF	YUG	Haris Smajić
7	MF	YUG	Safet Sušić (Captain)
—	MF	YUG	Ivica Vujičević
—	MF	YUG	Slaviša Vukičević
—	FW	YUG	Husref Musemić
—	FW	YUG	Agim Nikolić
—	FW	YUG	Vladimir Petković
—	FW	YUG	Muhidin Teskeredžić
—	FW	YUG	Dinko Vrabac

== Competitions ==
=== Overview ===
Competition	First match	Last match	Starting round	Final position	Record							
Competition	First match	Last match	Starting round	Final position	Pld	W	D	L	GF	GA	GD	Win %
Yugoslav First League	26 July 1981	2 May 1982	Matchday 1	4th	34	16	7	11	57	54	+3	47.06
Yugoslav Cup	7 October 1981	11 November 1981	Round of 32	Round of 16	2	1	0	1	5	2	+3	50.00
Total					36	17	7	12	62	56	+6	47.22

Source: Competitions

=== Yugoslav First League ===
==== League table ====
Pos	Team	Pld	W	D	L	GF	GA	GD	Pts	Qualification or relegation
2	Red Star Belgrade	34	17	10	7	68	40	+28	44	Qualification for Cup Winners' Cup first round
3	Hajduk Split	34	17	10	7	53	31	+22	44	Qualification for UEFA Cup first round
4	Sarajevo	34	16	7	11	57	54	+3	39	Qualification for UEFA Cup first round
5	Željezničar	34	16	6	12	52	37	+15	38	
6	Partizan	34	14	9	11	40	31	+9	37	

Source: rsssf.org
Rules for classification: 1) points; 2) goal difference; 3) number of goals scored.

==== Matches ====
26 July 1981 1	Rijeka	2–1	Sarajevo	Rijeka
		Report		Stadium: Stadion Kantrida; Attendance: 3,000

2 August 1981 2	Sarajevo	0–0	Osijek	Sarajevo
		Report		Stadium: Grbavica Stadium; Attendance: 5,000

9 August 1981 3	Olimpija	4–1	Sarajevo	Ljubljana
		Report		Stadium: Bežigrad Stadium; Attendance: 6,000

16 August 1981 4	Sarajevo	3–1	Vardar	Sarajevo
		Report		Stadium: Grbavica Stadium; Attendance: 8,000

23 August 1981 5	Željezničar	4–1	Sarajevo	Sarajevo
		Report		Stadium: Grbavica Stadium; Attendance: 22,000

30 August 1981 6	Sarajevo	2–3	Dinamo	Sarajevo
		Report		Stadium: Grbavica Stadium; Attendance: 10,000

12 September 1981 7	Velež	4–0	Sarajevo	Mostar
		Report		Stadium: Bijeli Brijeg Stadium; Attendance: 6,000

17 September 1981 8	Sarajevo	2–1	Budućnost	Sarajevo
		Report		Stadium: Grbavica Stadium; Attendance: 8,000

24 September 1981 9	OFK Beograd	1–1	Sarajevo	Belgrade
		Report		Stadium: Karaburma Stadium; Attendance: 5,000

26 September 1981 10	Sarajevo	2–1	Red Star	Sarajevo
		Report		Stadium: Koševo City Stadium; Attendance: 40,000

4 October 1981 11	Hajduk	1–4	Sarajevo	Split
		Report		Stadium: Poljud Stadium; Attendance: 15,000

10 October 1981 12	Sarajevo	1–4	Sloboda	Sarajevo
		Report		Stadium: Koševo City Stadium; Attendance: 6,000

25 October 1981 13	Teteks	2–3	Sarajevo	Tetovo
		Report		Stadium: City Stadium Tetovo; Attendance: 5,000

28 October 1981 14	Radnički	2–4	Sarajevo	Niš
		Report		Stadium: Čair Stadium; Attendance: 3,000

1 November 1981 15	Sarajevo	0–0	Zagreb	Sarajevo
		Report		Stadium: Koševo City Stadium; Attendance: 7,000

7 November 1981 16	Vojvodina	4–1	Sarajevo	Novi Sad
		Report		Stadium: Stadion Vojvodine; Attendance: 2,000

15 November 1981 17	Sarajevo	0–0	Partizan	Sarajevo
		Report		Stadium: Koševo City Stadium; Attendance: 10,000

14 February 1982 18	Sarajevo	6–1	Rijeka	Sarajevo
		Report		Stadium: Koševo City Stadium; Attendance: 17,000

21 February 1982 19	Osijek	1–1	Sarajevo	Osijek
		Report		Stadium: Gradski Vrt Stadium; Attendance: 10,000

27 February 1982 20	Sarajevo	1–0	Olimpija	Sarajevo
		Report		Stadium: Koševo City Stadium; Attendance: 3,000

7 March 1982 21	Vardar	3–2	Sarajevo	Skopje
		Report		Stadium: Skopje City Stadium; Attendance: 8,000

10 March 1982 22	Sarajevo	2–1	Željezničar	Sarajevo
		Report		Stadium: Koševo City Stadium; Attendance: 55,000

14 March 1982 23	Dinamo	3–2	Sarajevo	Zagreb
		Report		Stadium: Maksimir Stadium; Attendance: 45,000

21 March 1982 24	Sarajevo	4–1	Velež	Sarajevo
		Report		Stadium: Koševo City Stadium; Attendance: 20,000

25 March 1982 25	Budućnost	1–0	Sarajevo	Podgorica
		Report		Stadium: Podgorica City Stadium; Attendance: 5,000

28 March 1982 26	Sarajevo	1–1	OFK Beograd	Sarajevo
		Report		Stadium: Koševo City Stadium; Attendance: 8,000

31 March 1982 27	Red Star	5–1	Sarajevo	Belgrade
		Report		Stadium: Marakana Stadium; Attendance: 10,000

4 April 1982 28	Sarajevo	1–0	Hajduk	Sarajevo
		Report		Stadium: Koševo City Stadium; Attendance: 23,000

11 April 1982 29	Sloboda	0–1	Sarajevo	Tuzla
		Report		Stadium: Tušanj City Stadium; Attendance: 7,000

14 April 1982 30	Sarajevo	4–1	Teteks	Sarajevo
		Report		Stadium: Koševo City Stadium; Attendance: 2,000

17 April 1982 31	Sarajevo	3–2	Radnički	Sarajevo
		Report		Stadium: Koševo City Stadium; Attendance: 8,000

25 April 1982 32	Zagreb	0–1	Sarajevo	Zagreb
		Report		Stadium: Stadion Kranjčevićeva; Attendance: 2,000

28 April 1982 33	Sarajevo	1–0	Vojvodina	Sarajevo
		Report		Stadium: Koševo City Stadium; Attendance: 8,000

2 May 1982 34	Partizan	0–0	Sarajevo	Belgrade
		Report		Stadium: JNA Stadium; Attendance: 10,000

=== Yugoslav Cup ===
==== Round of 32 ====
7 October 1981	Sarajevo	5–0	Proleter Zrenjanin	Sarajevo
15:00 CET (UTC+2)		Report		Stadium: Koševo City Stadium; Attendance: 3,000

==== Round of 16 ====
11 November 1981	Red Star	2–0	Sarajevo	Belgrade
16:30 CET (UTC+1)		Report		Stadium: Marakana Stadium; Attendance: 5,000
