= 1975–76 FK Sarajevo season =

Sarajevo
1975–76 season
- Director general: Svetozar Vujović
- President: Ljubomir Grupković
- Manager: Vukašin Višnjevac
- Stadium: Koševo City Stadium
- Yugoslav First League: 7th
- Yugoslav Cup: Round of 32
- Highest home attendance: 30,000 vs Red Star (30 May 1976)
- Lowest home attendance: 2,000 vs Borac (6 June 1976)
- Average home league attendance: 9,618
- Biggest win: Sarajevo 6–0 OFK Beograd (24 August 1975)
- Biggest defeat: Red Star 5–1 Sarajevo (18 October 1975)

The 1975–76 Sarajevo season was the club's 29th season in history, and their 27th season in the top flight of Yugoslav football, the Yugoslav First League. Besides competing in the First League, the team competed in the National Cup.

== Squad information ==
=== First-team squad ===
Note: Flags indicate national team as defined under FIFA eligibility rules; some limited exceptions apply. Players may hold more than one non-FIFA nationality.

No.	Pos.	Nation	Player
—	GK	YUG	Fahrija Dautbegović
—	GK	YUG	Savo Ekmečić
—	GK	YUG	Sead Gruda
—	DF	YUG	Sulejman Demir
—	DF	YUG	Nijaz Ferhatović
—	DF	YUG	Zoran Lukić
—	DF	YUG	Salko Nikšić
—	DF	YUG	Abdulah Oruč
—	DF	YUG	Ante Rajković
—	DF	YUG	Anđelko Tešan
—	DF	YUG	Želimir Vidović
—	MF	YUG	Branko Bošnjak
—	MF	YUG	Goran Bugarin
—	MF	YUG	Enver Heto

No.	Pos.	Nation	Player
—	MF	YUG	Dušan Jovanović
—	MF	YUG	Slobodan Lubura
—	MF	YUG	Nijaz Merdanović
—	MF	YUG	Predrag Pašić
—	MF	YUG	Ranko Petković
—	MF	YUG	Denijal Pirić
—	MF	YUG	Sabit Sadiković
—	MF	YUG	Dragoljub Simić
—	MF	YUG	Safet Sušić
—	MF	YUG	Edhem Šljivo (Captain)
—	MF	YUG	Nedžad Živojević
—	FW	YUG	Zlatko Dupovac
—	FW	YUG	Srebrenko Repčić
—	FW	YUG	Radomir Savić

== Competitions ==
=== Overview ===
Competition	First match	Last match	Starting round	Final position	Record							
Competition	First match	Last match	Starting round	Final position	Pld	W	D	L	GF	GA	GD	Win %
Yugoslav First League	17 August 1975	11 July 1976	Matchday 1	7th	34	12	9	13	45	51	−6	35.29
Yugoslav Cup	17 September 1975		Round of 32	Round of 32	1	0	0	1	0	4	−4	0.00
Total					35	12	9	14	45	55	−10	34.29

Source: Competitions

=== Yugoslav First League ===
==== League table ====
Pos	Team	Pld	W	D	L	GF	GA	GD	Pts	Qualification or relegation
5	Vojvodina	34	11	12	11	41	42	−1	34	Qualification for Intertoto Cup
6	Sloboda Tuzla	34	11	11	12	46	42	+4	33	
7	Sarajevo	34	12	9	13	45	51	−6	33	
8	OFK Belgrade	34	13	7	14	40	48	−8	33	
9	Velež	34	10	12	12	39	37	+2	32	

Source: rsssf.org
Rules for classification: 1) points; 2) goal difference; 3) number of goals scored.

==== Matches ====
17 August 1975 1	Sarajevo	3–1	Vardar	Sarajevo
		Report		Stadium: Koševo City Stadium; Attendance: 8,000

24 August 1975 2	Sarajevo	6–0	OFK Beograd	Sarajevo
		Report		Stadium: Koševo City Stadium; Attendance: 8,000

27 August 1975 3	Vojvodina	1–0	Sarajevo	Novi Sad
		Report		Stadium: Stadion Vojvodine; Attendance: 14,000

31 August 1975 4	Sarajevo	0–0	Velež	Sarajevo
		Report		Stadium: Koševo City Stadium; Attendance: 20,000

7 September 1975 5	Budućnost	2–0	Sarajevo	Podgorica
		Report		Stadium: Podgorica City Stadium; Attendance: 15,000

14 September 1975 6	Sarajevo	2–1	Olimpija	Sarajevo
		Report		Stadium: Koševo City Stadium; Attendance: 6,000

20 September 1975 7	Dinamo	2–0	Sarajevo	Zagreb
		Report		Stadium: Maksimir Stadium; Attendance: 8,000

28 September 1975 8	Sarajevo	1–0	Rijeka	Sarajevo
		Report		Stadium: Koševo City Stadium; Attendance: 8,000

5 October 1975 9	Radnički Niš	2–0	Sarajevo	Niš
		Report		Stadium: Čair Stadium; Attendance: 8,000

8 October 1975 10	Sarajevo	2–2	Željezničar	Sarajevo
		Report		Stadium: Koševo City Stadium; Attendance: 20,000

18 October 1975 11	Red Star	5–1	Sarajevo	Belgrade
		Report		Stadium: Marakana Stadium; Attendance: 20,000

25 October 1975 12	Sarajevo	3–5	Partizan	Sarajevo
		Report		Stadium: Koševo City Stadium; Attendance: 10,000

2 November 1975 13	Borac	3–1	Sarajevo	Banja Luka
		Report		Stadium: Banja Luka City Stadium; Attendance: 11,000

9 November 1975 14	Sarajevo	3–2	Radnički Kragujevac	Sarajevo
		Report		Stadium: Koševo City Stadium; Attendance: 5,000

23 November 1975 15	Čelik	1–0	Sarajevo	Zenica
		Report		Stadium: Bilino Polje Stadium; Attendance: 3,000

3 December 1975 16	Sarajevo	0–0	Hajduk	Sarajevo
		Report		Stadium: Koševo City Stadium; Attendance: 12,000

7 December 1975 17	Sloboda	1–0	Sarajevo	Tuzla
		Report		Stadium: Tušanj City Stadium; Attendance: 3,000

7 March 1976 18	Vardar	2–2	Sarajevo	Skopje
		Report		Stadium: Skopje City Stadium; Attendance: 8,000

14 March 1976 19	OFK Beograd	3–0	Sarajevo	Belgrade
		Report		Stadium: Karaburma Stadium; Attendance: 3,000

21 March 1976 20	Sarajevo	3–0	Vojvodina	Sarajevo
		Report		Stadium: Koševo City Stadium; Attendance: 6,000

24 March 1976 21	Velež	0–1	Sarajevo	Mostar
		Report		Stadium: Bijeli Brijeg Stadium; Attendance: 2,000

28 March 1976 22	Sarajevo	1–1	Budućnost	Sarajevo
		Report		Stadium: Koševo City Stadium; Attendance: 10,000

4 April 1976 23	Olimpija	1–3	Sarajevo	Ljubljana
		Report		Stadium: Bežigrad Stadium; Attendance: 8,000

10 April 1976 24	Sarajevo	1–1	Dinamo	Sarajevo
		Report		Stadium: Koševo City Stadium; Attendance: 2,500

2 May 1976 25	Rijeka	2–0	Sarajevo	Rijeka
		Report		Stadium: Kantrida Stadium; Attendance: 5,000

5 May 1976 26	Sarajevo	1–1	Radnički Niš	Sarajevo
		Report		Stadium: Koševo City Stadium; Attendance: 7,000

9 May 1976 27	Željezničar	0–2	Sarajevo	Sarajevo
		Report		Stadium: Grbavica Stadium; Attendance: 18,000

30 May 1976 28	Sarajevo	2–1	Red Star	Sarajevo
		Report		Stadium: Koševo City Stadium; Attendance: 30,000

3 June 1976 29	Partizan	2–0	Sarajevo	Belgrade
		Report		Stadium: JNA Stadium; Attendance: 15,000

6 June 1976 30	Sarajevo	1–1	Borac	Sarajevo
		Report		Stadium: Koševo City Stadium; Attendance: 2,000

27 June 1976 31	Radnički Kragujevac	0–1	Sarajevo	Kragujevac
		Report		Stadium: Čika Dača Stadium; Attendance: 2,500

30 June 1976 32	Sarajevo	2–1	Čelik	Sarajevo
		Report		Stadium: Koševo City Stadium; Attendance: 4,000

4 July 1976 33	Hajduk	4–0	Sarajevo	Split
		Report		Stadium: Plinara Stadion; Attendance: 28,000

11 July 1976 34	Sarajevo	3–3	Sloboda	Sarajevo
		Report		Stadium: Koševo City Stadium; Attendance: 5,000

=== Yugoslav Cup ===
==== Round of 32 ====
17 September 1975	Sarajevo	0–4	Zagreb	Sarajevo
15:45 CEST (UTC+2)		Report		Stadium: Koševo City Stadium; Attendance: 3,000
