= List of FK Sarajevo seasons =

Fudbalski klub Sarajevo (Cyrillic: Фудбалски клуб Сарајево, IPA: [fûdbalskiː klûːb sɑɹəˈjeɪvəʊ]; English: Sarajevo Football Club) is a professional football club based in Sarajevo, the capital city of Bosnia and Herzegovina and is one of the most successful clubs in the country.

This is a season-by-season record of the club's league performances:

== SFR Yugoslavia (1946–1992) ==
Season	League									Cup	Europe	Top goalscorer^{1}		Notes
Season	Division	P	W	D	L	F	A	Pts	Pos	Cup	Europe	Name	Goals	Notes
1946–47	Republic League	15	9	3	3	66	23	38	1st			Nerćes Novo	6	
1947–48	Yugoslav First League	18	2	7	9	19	40	11	10th	3rd		Mile Novaković	21	
1948–49	Yugoslav Second League	18	11	5	2	27	14	27	1st	R4; R3		Franjo Lovrić	19	^{2}
1950	Yugoslav First League	18	7	3	6	30	27	17	5th	QF		Franjo Lovrić	22	
1951	Yugoslav First League	22	6	8	8	25	39	20	7th	R3		Drago Žigman	19	
1952	Yugoslav First League; Preliminary Group	10	3	0	7	8	21	6	6th			Dobrivoje Živkov	21	^{3}
1952	Yugoslav First League; Relegation group	6	3	2	1	8	3	8	1st			Dobrivoje Živkov	21	^{3}
1952–53	Yugoslav First League	22	9	4	9	39	33	22	6th	SF		Dobrivoje Živkov	28	
1953–54	Yugoslav First League	26	10	4	12	35	45	24	7th	R1		Dobrivoje Živkov	19	
1954–55	Yugoslav First League	26	11	6	9	50	36	28	7th	Q – F		Dobrivoje Živkov	31	
1955–56	Yugoslav First League	26	12	3	11	47	48	37	6th	R1		Osman Jusufbegović	30	^{4}
1956–57	Yugoslav First League	26	9	4	13	38	52	22	13th	Q – SF		Dobrivoje Živkov	29	
1957–58	Yugoslav Second League	15	10	2	3	45	21	22	1st	Q – SF		Salih Šehović	36	
1958–59	Yugoslav First League	22	7	4	11	25	36	18	10th	R1		Zijad Arslanagić	21	
1959–60	Yugoslav First League	22	9	5	8	35	39	23	6th	R1	Mitropa Cup	Zijad Arslanagić	38	
1960–61	Yugoslav First League	22	6	6	10	33	39	18	8th	R1	Balkans Cup	Zijad Arslanagić	26	
1961–62	Yugoslav First League	22	6	10	6	37	40	22	7th	QF	Balkans Cup	Zijad Arslanagić	25	
1962–63	Yugoslav First League	26	9	5	12	28	40	23	9th	R1	Intertoto Cup	Zijad Arslanagić	25	
1963–64	Yugoslav First League	26	11	7	8	47	37	29	4th	R1		Džemaludin Mušović	28	
1964–65	Yugoslav First League	28	15	5	8	52	38	35	2nd	R1	Intertoto Cup	Džemaludin Mušović	32	
1965–66	Yugoslav First League	30	10	9	11	40	44	29	9th	Q – R1	Mitropa Cup	Boško Antić	26	
1966–67	Yugoslav First League	30	18	6	6	51	29	42	1st	Runners-up	Mitropa Cup	Boško Antić	30	^{5}
1967–68	Yugoslav First League	30	13	3	14	46	39	29	7th	Q – QF	European Cup – R2	Boško Antić	23	
1968–69	Yugoslav First League	34	10	13	11	38	44	33	11th	Q – QF		Boško Prodanović	18	
1969–70	Yugoslav First League	34	9	12	13	32	42	30	12th	Q – SF		Vahidin Musemić	23	
1970–71	Yugoslav First League	34	9	11	14	42	51	29	12th	Q – SF		Vahidin Musemić	23	
1971–72	Yugoslav First League	34	10	8	16	43	46	28	15th	R1		Vahidin Musemić	25	
1972–73	Yugoslav First League	34	12	10	12	48	50	34	7th			Džemil Cerić	17	
1973–74	Yugoslav First League	34	11	9	14	29	42	31	14th	R1	Mitropa Cup	Ranko Petković	10	
1974–75	Yugoslav First League	34	8	14	12	38	40	30	13th	R2		Safet Sušić	20	^{4}
1975–76	Yugoslav First League	34	12	9	13	45	51	33	7th	R1		Edhem Šljivo	9	
1976–77	Yugoslav First League	34	10	10	14	40	55	30	16th	QF		Safet Sušić	12	
1977–78	Yugoslav First League	34	11	10	13	50	46	32	9th	R2		Radomir Savić	21	
1978–79	Yugoslav First League	34	17	5	12	56	53	39	4th	R1		Safet Sušić	15	
1979–80	Yugoslav First League	34	17	7	10	55	41	41	2nd	SF		Safet Sušić	17	
1980–81	Yugoslav First League	34	12	8	14	47	53	32	13th	R1	UEFA Cup – R2	Husref Musemić	9	
1981–82	Yugoslav First League	34	16	7	11	57	54	39	4th	R2		Predrag Pašić	15	
1982–83	Yugoslav First League	34	10	12	12	45	44	32	11th	Runners-up	UEFA Cup – R3	Safet Sušić	14	
1983–84	Yugoslav First League	34	11	10	13	53	46	32	9th	QF		Husref Musemić	11	
1984–85	Yugoslav First League	34	19	10	5	51	30	48	1st	R1		Husref Musemić	19	
1985–86	Yugoslav First League	34	11	8	15	41	46	30	15th	R1	European Cup – R1	Dragan Jakovljević	10	
1986–87	Yugoslav First League	34	12	9	13	39	49	33	13th	R1		Dragan Jakovljević	15	
1987–88	Yugoslav First League	34	11	8	15	37	47	30	14th	QF		Dragan Jakovljević	12	
1988–89	Yugoslav First League	34	11	7 (6)	10	13	35	28	13th	R2		Boban Božović	9	^{6}
1989–90	Yugoslav First League	34	13	5 (1)	4	46	49	27	13th	R2		Boban Božović	13	
1990–91	Yugoslav First League	36	13	6 (5)	10	37	48	31	11th	R2		Kuprešanin, Nedić	9	
1991–92	Yugoslav First League	36	12	3 (3)	14	33	45	27	9th	R2		Unknown	n/a	^{5} ^{7}

== Bosnia and Herzegovina (1994–present) ==
Season	League									Cup	Europe	Top goalscorer^{1}		Notes
Season	Division	P	W	D	L	F	A	Pts	Pos	Cup	Europe	Name	Goals	Notes
1994–95	First League of Bosnia and Herzegovina; Jablanica Group	5	5	0	0	18	1	15	1st	QF		Elvir Baljić	8	^{8}
1994–95	First League of Bosnia and Herzegovina; Final Play-off	3	1	1	1	3	4	4	2nd	QF		Elvir Baljić	8	^{8}
1995–96	First League of Bosnia and Herzegovina	30	12	7	11	38	29	43	7th	SF		Reuf Herco	9	
1996–97	First League of Bosnia and Herzegovina	30	16	8	6	57	23	56	2nd	Winners		Smječanin, Uščuplić	12	
1997–98	First League of Bosnia and Herzegovina; Bosniaks First League	30	15	8	7	56	33	53	3rd	Winners		Alen Avdić	14	^{9}
1997–98	First League of Bosnia and Herzegovina; Final Play-off	3	1	1	1	1	2	4	2nd	Winners		Alen Avdić	14	^{9}
1998–99	First League of Bosnia and Herzegovina	30	22	2	6	55	21	68	1st	Runners-up	UEFA Cup – Q	Džemo Smječanin	14	
1999–2000	First League of Bosnia and Herzegovina; Bosniaks First League	30	16	7	7	54	24	55	3rd	QF		Almedin Hota	9	
1999–2000	First League of Bosnia and Herzegovina; Final Play-off	6	4	0	2	14	6	12	3rd	QF		Almedin Hota	9	
2000–01	Premier League of Bosnia and Herzegovina	42	24	9	9	81	35	81	3rd	Runners-up		Edin Šaranović	20	^{10}
2001–02	Premier League of Bosnia and Herzegovina	30	13	8	9	50	34	47	4th	Winners	UEFA Cup – Q	Edin Šaranović	12	^{11}
Current format of Premier League of Bosnia and Herzegovina
2002–03	Premier League of Bosnia and Herzegovina	30	19	7	12	83	39	69	3rd	SF	UEFA Cup – R1	Emir Obuća	27	
2003–04	Premier League of Bosnia and Herzegovina	30	17	5	8	58	25	56	3rd	QF	UEFA Cup – Q	Alen Škoro	20	
2004–05	Premier League of Bosnia and Herzegovina	30	13	6	11	39	37	45	4th	Winners		Emir Obuća	12	
2005–06	Premier League of Bosnia and Herzegovina	30	18	6	6	57	26	60	2nd	QF		Alen Avdić	13	
2006–07	Premier League of Bosnia and Herzegovina	30	17	6	7	44	26	57	1st	SF		Emir Obuća	13	
2007–08	Premier League of Bosnia and Herzegovina	30	14	6	10	40	30	48	5th	QF	UEFA Champions League – QR3	Haris Handžić	9	
2008–09	Premier League of Bosnia and Herzegovina	30	14	7	9	43	30	49	4th	R1		Admir Raščić	9	
2009–10	Premier League of Bosnia and Herzegovina	30	14	8	8	43	25	50	5th	R2	UEFA Europa League – QR4	Alen Škoro	13	
2010–11	Premier League of Bosnia and Herzegovina	30	17	6	7	51	26	57	2nd	QF		Emir Obuća	8	
2011–12	Premier League of Bosnia and Herzegovina	30	16	6	8	48	31	54	4th	QF	UEFA Europa League – QR3	Nermin Haskić	11	
2012–13	Premier League of Bosnia and Herzegovina	30	17	9	4	52	19	60	2nd	R2	UEFA Europa League – QR3	Emir Hadžić	26	
2013–14	Premier League of Bosnia and Herzegovina	30	17	8	5	66	23	58	3rd	Winners	UEFA Europa League – QR2	Nikola Komazec	14	
2014–15	Premier League of Bosnia and Herzegovina	30	19	9	2	55	17	66	1st	QF	UEFA Europa League – QR4	Krste Velkoski	13	
2015–16	Premier League of Bosnia and Herzegovina	30	18	3	9	56	28	57	4th	QF	UEFA Champions League – QR2	Leon Benko	18	
2016–17	Premier League of Bosnia and Herzegovina	32	16	11	5	41	22	59	3rd	Runners-up		Mersudin Ahmetović	12	^{12}
2017–18	Premier League of Bosnia and Herzegovina	32	17	5	10	58	28	56	3rd	R1	UEFA Europa League – QR1	Mersudin Ahmetović	19	
2018–19	Premier League of Bosnia and Herzegovina	33	21	7	5	68	20	70	1st	Winners	UEFA Europa League – QR2	Mersudin Ahmetović	16	^{13}
2019–20	Premier League of Bosnia and Herzegovina	22	13	6	3	38	19	45	1st	R2	UEFA Champions League – QR1; UEFA Europa League – QR3	Mersudin Ahmetović	13	^{14}
2020–21	Premier League of Bosnia and Herzegovina	33	18	11	4	53	24	65	2nd	Winners	UEFA Champions League – QR2; UEFA Europa League – QR4	Benjamin Tatar; Matthias Fanimo	13	
2021–22	Premier League of Bosnia and Herzegovina	33	13	7	13	37	33	46	4th	Runners-up	UEFA Europa Conference League – QR1	Dal Varešanović; Hamza Čataković; Asmir Suljić	5	
2022–23	Premier League of Bosnia and Herzegovina	33	15	7	11	50	46	52	4th	R1		Renan Oliveira	9	
2023–24	Premier League of Bosnia and Herzegovina	33	16	8	9	57	38	53^{15}	4th	QF	UEFA Europa Conference League – QR1	Hamza Čataković	19	
2024–25	Premier League of Bosnia and Herzegovina	33	18	11	4	59	24	65	3rd	Winners	UEFA Conference League – QR2	Giorgi Guliashvili	21	
2025–26	Premier League of Bosnia and Herzegovina	36	19	8	9	54	37	65	3rd	QF	UEFA Conference League – QR2	Agon Elezi	9	

== Notes ==
1 Goals in all competitions are counted.
2 From 1947–48 to 1951 the Yugoslav Second League was known as the United League (Jedinstvena liga).
3 The 1952 season was shortened and sped-up. The reason for the change was a desire to implement the fall-spring competition format. The competition took place in two phases. In the first clubs were divided into two preliminary groups of 6 teams. Based on their ranking at the end of preliminary groups they were promoted to three further groups: Title, Central and Relegation. Each of them containing 4 teams.
4 Cup competition was not held for 1955–56 and 1974–75 seasons.
5 First title in domestic league competitions.
6 Between 1988–89 and 1991–92, drawn games went to penalties with the winners of the shoot out gaining the point. Figures in brackets represent points won in such shoot outs.
7 Midway through the 1991–92 season the club, along with other Bosnian and Macedonian sides, abandoned the competition as Bosnia and Herzegovina gained independence from Yugoslavia (Slovenian and Croatian sides had succeeded a few months prior). The resulting war would halt competitive football in the country for four years.
8 The first season of the First League of Bosnia and Herzegovina was played in 1994–95. Four regional groups were organized, with the winners and runners-up from each group competing in a Play-off format for the title.
9 The 1997–98 season broke the ethnic barrier for the first time since the war, with a Play-off between winners of the all-Bosniak First League of Bosnia and Herzegovina and the Croat First League organized for the national title. This format was kept until the 1999–2000 season when a joint league was formed, with the Play-off system being scrapped.
10 The 2000–01 competition was renamed the Premier League of Bosnia and Herzegovina. It was only contested by Bosniak and Croatian clubs.
11 The 2001–02 season was the debut year for Serbian clubs from the Republika Srpska. They had previously competed in the First League of the Republika Srpska.
12 The 2016–17 season was the first to be organized with 12 team and a two-stage format - Regular season league and Championship/Relegation league rounds. The top six teams in the regular season qualify for the Championship league round, while the bottom six compete between themselves in an effort to avoid relegation.
13 In the 2018–19 season the league returned the one-stage format, by which every team played a total of 33 games. After all teams play each other two times, once at home and once away, the third game is played on a ground which is determined using the Berger system.
14 The 2019–20 season was suspended in March 2020 due to the COVID-19 pandemic in Bosnia and Herzegovina. The season was curtailed and the final standings (including Sarajevo as champions) were declared by a points-per-game ratio on 1 June 2020.
15 Sarajevo were deducted 3 points for having its players leave the pitch in protest of multiple officiating decisions during a Bosnian Cup game against Borac.
