= 1994–95 FK Sarajevo season =

Sarajevo
1994–95 season
- President: Muhamed Granov
- Manager: Fuad Muzurović
- Stadium: Jablanica City Stadium; Bilino Polje Stadium; Koševo City Stadium
- First League of BiH: 2nd
- Cup of BiH: Quarter-finals
- Top goalscorer: League: Almir Turković; Azrudin Valentić (4); All: Elvir Baljić; Elmir Behlulović (8)
- Highest home attendance: 7,000 vs Bosna (10 September 1994)
- Lowest home attendance: 200 vs Velež (26 April 1995)
- Average home league attendance: 2,814
- Biggest win: Sarajevo 7–1 Partizan Sarajevo (8 October 1994)
- Biggest defeat: Velež 6–1 Sarajevo (26 April 1995)

The 1994–95 Sarajevo season was the club's 46th season in history, and their 1st consecutive season in the top flight of Bosnian football, the First League of BiH. Besides competing in the Premier League, the team competed in the National Cup.

== Squad information ==
=== First-team squad ===
Note: Flags indicate national team as defined under FIFA eligibility rules; some limited exceptions apply. Players may hold more than one non-FIFA nationality.

No.	Pos.	Nation	Player
—	GK	BIH	Admir Herco
—	GK	BIH	Ismir Pintol
—	GK	BIH	Edin Tucaković
—	DF	BIH	Emir Alihodžić
—	DF	BIH	Rusmir Burek
—	DF	BIH	Adis Čimić
—	DF	BIH	Muamer Dalipagić
—	DF	BIH	Dino Durak
—	DF	BIH	Nedžad Fazlagić (3rd captain)
—	DF	BIH	Admir Fejzić
—	DF	BIH	Mirza Selimović
—	DF	BIH	Mirza Varešanović (captain)
—	DF	CRO	Boris Živković
—	MF	BIH	Dženan Uščuplić
—	MF	BIH	Elvir Baljić

No.	Pos.	Nation	Player
—	MF	BIH	Nermin Gogalić
—	MF	BIH	Elvir Koljenović
—	MF	BIH	Šahin Pita
—	MF	BIH	Senad Repuh (Vice-captain)
—	MF	BIH	Mladen Šimunović
—	MF	BIH	Azrudin Valentić
—	FW	BIH	Almir Turković
—	FW	BIH	Ismet Alić
—	FW	BIH	Alen Avdić
—	FW	BIH	Elmir Behlulović
—	FW	BIH	Edin Bulbul
—	FW	BIH	Emir Granov
—	FW	BIH	Džemo Smječanin
—	FW	BIH	Vahidin Terzić

== Kit ==
Supplier	Sponsor
(Belgium) Patrick	(Belgium) Patrick

== Competitions ==
=== Overview ===
Competition	First match	Last match	Starting round	Final position	Record							
Competition	First match	Last match	Starting round	Final position	Pld	W	D	L	GF	GA	GD	Win %
First League of BiH – First round	15 July 1994	23 July 1994	Matchday 1	1st	5	5	0	0	18	1	+17	100.00
First League of BiH – Play-off	7 September 1994	14 September 1994	Preliminary round	2nd	4	2	1	1	6	4	+2	50.00
Cup of BiH	8 October 1994	26 April 1995	Qualifications	Quarter-finals	5	4	0	1	20	9	+11	80.00
Total					14	11	1	2	44	14	+30	78.57

Source: Competitions

=== First League of Bosnia and Herzegovina ===
==== First Round (Group Jablanica) ====
Pos	Team	Pld	W	D	L	GF	GA	GD	Pts	Qualification
1	Sarajevo	5	5	0	0	18	1	+17	15	Qualification to play-off
2	Bosna	5	2	2	1	6	4	+2	8	Qualification to play-off
3	Radnički Lukavac	5	2	1	2	5	5	0	7	
4	Vrbanjuša	5	1	1	3	2	4	−2	4	
5	Rudar Kakanj	5	1	1	3	2	9	−7	4	
6	Iskra Bugojno	5	1	1	3	4	14	−10	4	

===== Matches =====
15 July 1994 1	Sarajevo	5–0	Rudar Kakanj	Jablanica
		Report		Stadium: Jablanica City Stadium

17 July 1994 2	Sarajevo	1–0	Vrbanjuša	Jablanica
		Report		Stadium: Jablanica City Stadium

19 July 1994 3	Sarajevo	6–1	Iskra Bugojno	Jablanica
		Report		Stadium: Jablanica City Stadium; Attendance: 2,000

21 July 1994 4	Sarajevo	3–0	Bosna Visoko	Jablanica
		Report		Stadium: Jablanica City Stadium; Attendance: 1,000

23 July 1994 5	Sarajevo	3–0 (awd.)	Radnički Lukavac	Jablanica
		Report		Stadium: Jablanica City Stadium; Attendance: 2,000

==== Play-off ====
===== Preliminary round =====
7 September 1994	Sarajevo	3–0	Slaven Živinice	Zenica
		Report		Stadium: Bilino Polje Stadium

===== Final =====
Pos	Team	Pld	W	D	L	GF	GA	GD	Pts
1	Čelik (C)	3	3	0	0	7	3	+4	9
2	Sarajevo	3	1	1	1	3	4	−1	4
3	Bosna	3	1	0	2	2	3	−1	3
4	Željezničar	3	0	1	2	4	6	−2	1

(C) Champions

10 September 1994 1	Sarajevo	1–0	Bosna	Zenica
		Report		Stadium: Bilino Polje Stadium; Attendance: 7,000

13 September 1994 2	Čelik	3–1	Sarajevo	Zenica
		Report		Stadium: Bilino Polje Stadium; Attendance: 8,000

14 September 1994 3	Sarajevo	1–1	Željezničar	Zenica
		Report		Stadium: Bilino Polje Stadium; Attendance: 5,000

=== Cup of Bosnia and Herzegovina ===
==== Qualifications (Sarajevo Region Cup) ====
8 October 1994 Round of 16	Sarajevo	7–1	Partizan Sarajevo	Sarajevo
		Report		Stadium: Koševo City Stadium

15 October 1994 Quarter-finals	Sarajevo	2–0	Old Stars	Sarajevo
		Report		Stadium: Koševo City Stadium

20 October 1994 Semi-finals	Sarajevo	6–0	Vratnik	Sarajevo
		Report		Stadium: Koševo City Stadium

22 October 1994 Final	Sarajevo	4–2	Željezničar	Sarajevo
		Report		Stadium: Koševo City Stadium; Attendance: 2,500

==== Quarter-finals ====
26 April 1995	Velež Mostar	6–1	Sarajevo	Mostar
		Report		Stadium: Sjeverni logor Attendance: 200
