= FK Lokomotiva Brčko =

Lokomotiva Brčko
- Full name: FK Lokomotiva Brčko
- Founded: 1948
- Manager: Dušan Mokan
- League: Second League of Republika Srpska East
Home colours	Away colours

FK Lokomotiva (Serbian Cyrillic: ФК Лoкoмoтивa Бpчкo) is a football club based in Brčko, Bosnia and Herzegovina.

It competes in the Second League of the Republika Srpska.

== Notable former coaches ==
- (Bosnia and Herzegovina) Savo Obradović
- (Bosnia and Herzegovina) Dragiša Krajšumović
