= Enver Lugušić =

Bosnian footballer and coach

Personal information
- Date of birth: 1 May 1961 (age 65)
- Place of birth: Foča, FPR Yugoslavia
- Height: 1.88 m (6 ft 2 in)
- Position: Goalkeeper

Senior career*
Years	Team	Apps	(Gls)
1979–1981	Lokomotiva Brčko	54	(0)
1981–1986	Jedinstvo Brčko	72	(0)
1986–1990	FK Sarajevo	107	(0)
1990–1992	Konyaspor	81	(0)
1992–1995	Kayserispor	88	(0)

International career
1986–1990	Yugoslav Olympic team	3	(0)

Managerial career
- 1998–2000: FK Sarajevo (goalkeeping coach)
- 2002–2004: Slavia Sofia (goalkeeping coach)
- 2004–2006: Bosnia and Herzegovina U21 (goalkeepingk coach)
- 2006–2007: Pegah (goalkeeping coach)
- 2007–2008: Saba Battery (goalkeeping coach)
- 2008–2010: Shanghai Shenhua (goalkeeping coach)
- 2008–2010: Bosnia and Herzegovina (goalkeeping coach)
- 2010–2011: Shandong Luneng (goalkeeping coach)
- 2011–2012: Persepolis (goalkeeping coach)
- 2012–2013: Al Wahda (goalkeeping coach)
- 2014: Al-Fujairah (goalkeeping coach)
- 2014–2016: Bosnia and Herzegovina (goalkeeping coach)
- 2016–2018: Japan (goalkeeping coach)
- 2018–2020: Al-Fujairah (goalkeeping coach)
- 2022–2023: FK Sarajevo (goalkeeping coordinator)
- * Club domestic league appearances and goals

Enver Lugušić (born 1 May 1961) is a retired Bosnian goalkeeper and current goalkeeping coach, who last managed Al-Fujairah.

== Playing career ==
=== Club ===
Lugušić started his career in FK Lokomotiva Brčko in 1979. Two years later, he moved to FK Jedinstvo Brčko where he played until 1986. Then he left to play in FK Sarajevo, where he spent four seasons before eventually leaving for Turkish Konyaspor. In Konyaspor, he was proclaimed the best goalkeeper of Turkish Süper Lig twice and won Gold Gloves British Petrol twice. In 1992, he left for Kayserispor where he played successfully until 1995.

=== International ===
Between 1986 and 1990, he played three matches for the Yugoslav Olympic team.

== Coaching career ==
Lugušić started his coaching career in 2002 in Bulgarian club PFC Slavia Sofia. In 2004 he joined the Bosnia and Herzegovina national Under-21 football team where he worked with national coach Mišo Smajlović, famous ex FK Željezničar Sarajevo player. In 2006 he left for Iranian club Pegah F.C. where he worked until 2007. In February 2007, Lugušić joined another Iranian club, Saba Battery. In 2008, he left for Chinese Shanghai Shenhua where he spent two years. While in Shanghai, he worked for the Bosnia and Herzegovina national football team with Croatian manager Miroslav Blažević. He left for the Chinese Shandong Luneng in 2010, where he worked with Croatian coach Branko Ivanković. In 2011 he joined Iranian Persepolis with Turkish coach Mustafa Denizli. After their contract ended in 2012, Lugušić left for Al Wahda, UAE Arabian Gulf League. He worked in another club in UAE in 2014, Al Fujairah, coached by Džemal Hadžiabdić, but he soon received an invitation for the Bosnia and Herzegovina national football team coached by Mehmed Baždarević which he didn't turn down. With the Bosnia and Herzegovina national football team he won Kirin Cup held in Japan. In 2016, he received a call from the Japan national football team, led by Vahid Halilhodžić, and signed a contract. In 2017 Lugušić qualified for the FIFA World Cup 2018 with the Japan national football team which was held in Russia. After the contract with head coach Vahid was terminated, Lugušić decided to leave as well. In 2018, he accepted ian invitation from Maktoum, Sheikh of Al-Fujairah SC and joined the staff of Czech coach Ivan Hašek.
