= Midhat Gluhačević =

Bosnian footballer

Personal information
- Date of birth: 2 June 1965 (age 61)
- Place of birth: Sarajevo, SFR Yugoslavia
- Date of death: 14 March 2005 (aged 39)
- Position: Forward

Senior career*
Years	Team	Apps	(Gls)
1987–1989	FK Sarajevo	18	(5)
1989–1990	Osijek	24	(7)
1991–1992	SC Freiburg	21	(1)
1992–1995	FC Stahl Brandenburg	41	(16)
1997–1998	1. FC Passau	12	(1)
1998–1999	Schweinfurt 05	18	(1)
1999–2001	1. FC Passau	34	(10)
2001–2003	Jahn Regensburg	9	(0)
Total		164	(45)
- * Club domestic league appearances and goals

Midhat Gluhačević (2 June 1965 — 14 March 2005) was a Bosnian professional footballer who played as a forward.

== Career ==
Gluhačević started his career with FK Sarajevo in 1987, before transferring to NK Osijek. With the start of the Yugoslav wars he moved to Germany where he played professionally until 2003.

== Death ==
He died after a long illness in 2005 at the age of 40.
