= Nenad Vidaković =

Bosnian-Herzegovinian footballer

Personal information
- Full name: Nenad Vidaković
- Date of birth: 1 January 1957 (age 69)
- Place of birth: Sarajevo, SFR Yugoslavia
- Position: Defender

Youth career
- Sarajevo

Senior career*
Years	Team	Apps	(Gls)
1975-1982	Sarajevo	121	(4)
1982-1986	Čelik Zenica	71	(2)
1986-1989	Kuşadasıspor	65	(3)

International career
1978	Yugoslavia U21	4	(0)
- * Club domestic league appearances and goals

Nenad Vidaković (Serbian Cyrillic: Ненад Видаковић; 1 January 1957) is a retired Yugoslav and a Bosnian professional footballer who played as a defender.
