= Bernard Barnjak =

Bosnian footballer (born 1965)

Personal information
- Date of birth: 1 May 1965 (age 61)
- Place of birth: Sarajevo, SFR Yugoslavia
- Height: 1.91 m (6 ft 3 in)
- Position: Forward

Senior career*
| Years | Team | Apps | (Gls) |
| 1985–1989 | FK Sarajevo | 98 | (18) |
| 1989–1990 | Hajduk Split | 23 | (4) |
| 1990 | Castellón | 3 | (0) |
| 1991 | FK Sarajevo | 17 | (4) |
| 1991–1994 | Famalicão | 48 | (5) |
| 1994–1996 | Apollon Smyrnis | 62 | (28) |
| 1996–1998 | Paniliakos | 46 | (16) |
| Total | | 297 | (75) |
- * Club domestic league appearances and goals

Bernard Barnjak (born 1 May 1965) is a Bosnian former professional footballer who played as a forward.

== Career ==
Born in Sarajevo, Socialist Federal Republic of Yugoslavia, Barnjak played for FK Sarajevo and Hajduk Split in the Yugoslav First League. In 1990, he moved abroad for the first time, joining CD Castellón in La Liga. Unsettled in Spain, he quickly returned to his first professional club.

In the 1991 summer, Barnjak signed for F.C. Famalicão, alongside teammate Dane Kuprešanin. Regularly used during three seasons, he helped the team to consecutive Primeira Liga campaigns.

Barnjak closed out his career at 33, after two years apiece with Greek sides Apollon Smyrnis FC of second division and Paniliakos of the Super League.
