= Dragan Jakovljević =

Bosnian and Yugoslav footballer

Personal information
- Full name: Dragan Jakovljević
- Date of birth: 23 February 1962 (age 64)
- Place of birth: Konjic, FPR Yugoslavia
- Height: 1.90 m (6 ft 3 in)
- Positions: Attacking midfielder; forward

Senior career*
Years	Team	Apps	(Gls)
1982–1984	Igman Konjic		
1984–1989	Sarajevo	126	(46)
1989–1991	Nantes	47	(7)
1991–1996	Royal Antwerp	52	(6)
1996–2003	VV Overpelt-Fabriek		

International career
1987–1989	Yugoslavia	8	(3)
- * Club domestic league appearances and goals

Dragan Jakovljević (Serbian Cyrillic: Драган Јаковљевић; born 23 February 1962) is a Bosnian and Yugoslav former footballer who played as a forward for FK Sarajevo, Nantes, Royal Antwerp as well as the SFR Yugoslavia national team.

== Club career ==
Jakovljević was an important member of the Sarajevo squad that won the 1984–85 Yugoslav First League and later became a Cup Winners Cup runner-up medal winner with Antwerp after losing the 1993 Final to Parma at Wembley Stadium.

== International career ==
He made his debut for Yugoslavia in a December 1987 European Championship qualification match away against Turkey and has earned a total of 8 caps, scoring 3 goals. Jakovljević was included by Yugoslavia national football team to UEFA Euro 1992 as a replacement player to Darko Pančev, who renounced in 24 May by claiming physical reasons, although this statement was believed for just a few people in Belgrade, who saw political views as the true cause of the withdrawal of the Macedonian forward. Jakovljević, however, could never play in the tournament, as the national team would be suspended one week later due to the Yugoslav Wars.

His final international was an October 1989 FIFA World Cup qualification match against Norway, although he later played an unofficial match against ACF Fiorentina in May 1992, as a substitute man to Dejan Petković. The Italian club did won by 2–1, in the last match of the old Yugoslavia team before the Euro ban and before the country being reduced to Serbia and Montenegro federation.

=== International goals ===
Scores and results table. Yugoslavia's goal tally first:

#	Date	Venue	Opponent	Score	Result	Competition
1	23 March 1988	Vetch Field, Swansea, Wales	Wales	2–1	2–1	Friendly
2	31 March 1988	Stadion Poljud, Split, Yugoslavia	Italy	1–1	1–1	Friendly
3	5 April 1989	Olympic Stadium, Athens, Greece	Greece	3–1	4–1	Friendly

== Honours ==
Sarajevo

- Yugoslav First League: 1984-85

Royal Antwerp

- Belgian Cup: 1991-92
- UEFA Cup Winners' Cup: 1992-93 (runners-up)
