= Čair Stadium =

Multipurpose stadium in Niš, Serbia

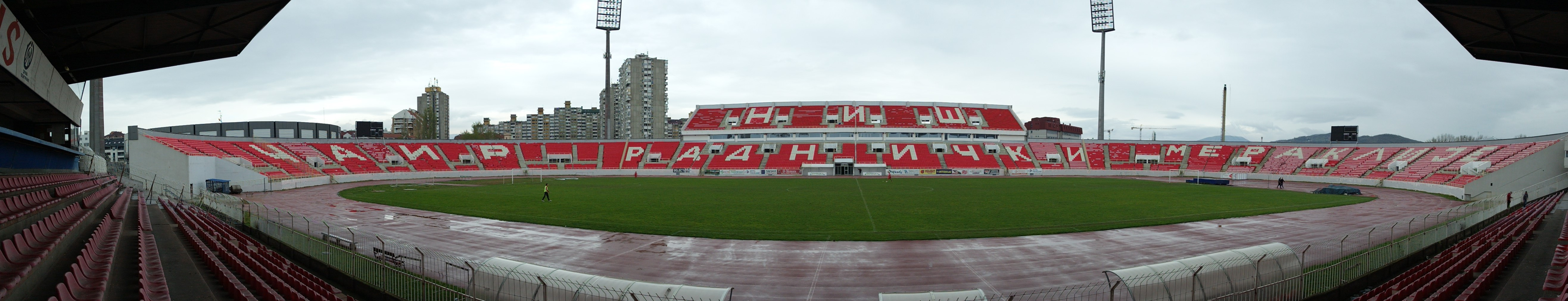
- Ground panorama.
- Interactive map of Čair Stadium
- Full name: Čair Stadium
- Location: Niš, Serbia
- Coordinates: 43°18′55.90″N 21°54′30.72″E
- Owner: City of Niš
- Operator: Radnički Niš
- Capacity: 18,151
- Surface: Hybrid grass
- Scoreboard: Yes
- Field size: 105 x 70 m

Construction
- Built: 1963
- Renovated: 2011–12
- Cost: Over €11 million (2011–12 renovation)

Tenant
- Radnički Niš (1963–present)

Čair Stadium (Serbian Cyrillic: Стадион Чаир, Stadion Čair) is a multi-purpose stadium in Niš, Serbia. It is used mostly for football matches and is the home ground of Radnički Niš. After a partial reconstruction that began in 2011, the renovated stadium re-opened to the public on 15 September 2012. The stadium is part of the Čair Sports Complex, which also includes an indoor swimming pool and an indoor arena.

== History ==
The stadium was built in 1963 and had an original capacity of 40,001 spectators.

A complete reconstruction began during the second half of 2011 in an ambitious project by the Football Association of Serbia and the city of Niš to replace decaying infrastructure at important sports venues. The refurbished stadium had a seating capacity of 18,151 spectators. The cost of the project was 1.1 billion dinars (approximately €10 million). Upon completion, the new stadium met UEFA standards to host international matches. In June 2012, the Football Association of Serbia announced that Čair would host the Serbia national team in their 2014 FIFA World Cup qualification match against Scotland on 26 March 2013. However, the match was played at the Karađorđe Stadium after it was announced that Čair Stadium would not meet all UEFA standards until May 2013. The stadium hosted its first football game after the renovation works on 15 September 2012, in which Radnički Niš beat FK Smederevo 1–0 in front of 7,000 spectators.

On 18 December 2012, it was announced that the city of Niš would devote an additional 250 million dinars to a newly-constructed 9,500-seater west stand to be built in 2013, which would bring the stadium capacity to a minimum of 25,003. However, work has not yet started.

== Gallery ==
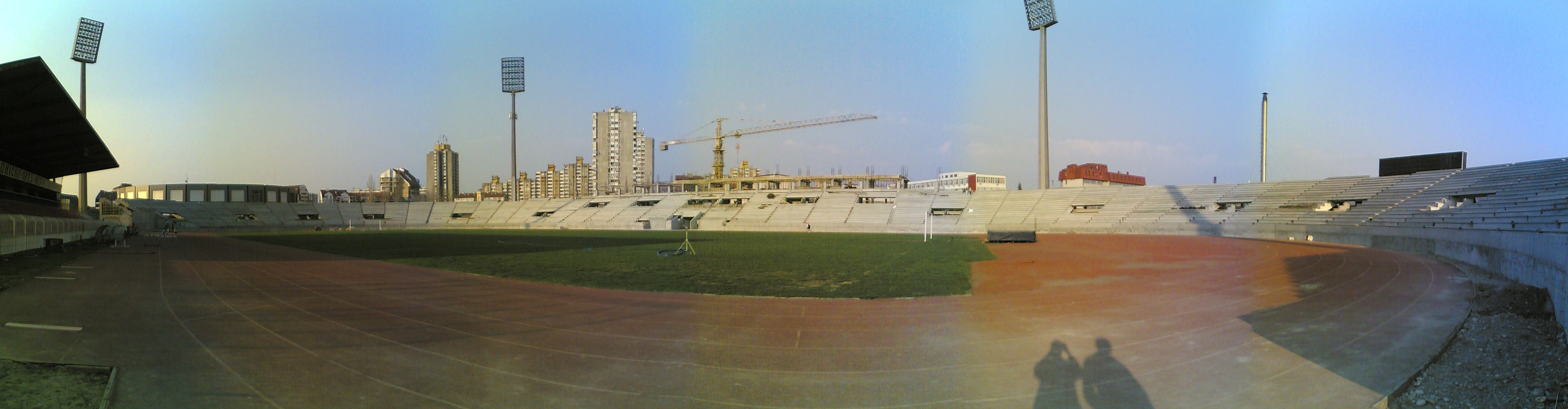
Čair Stadium under reconstruction (March 2012)

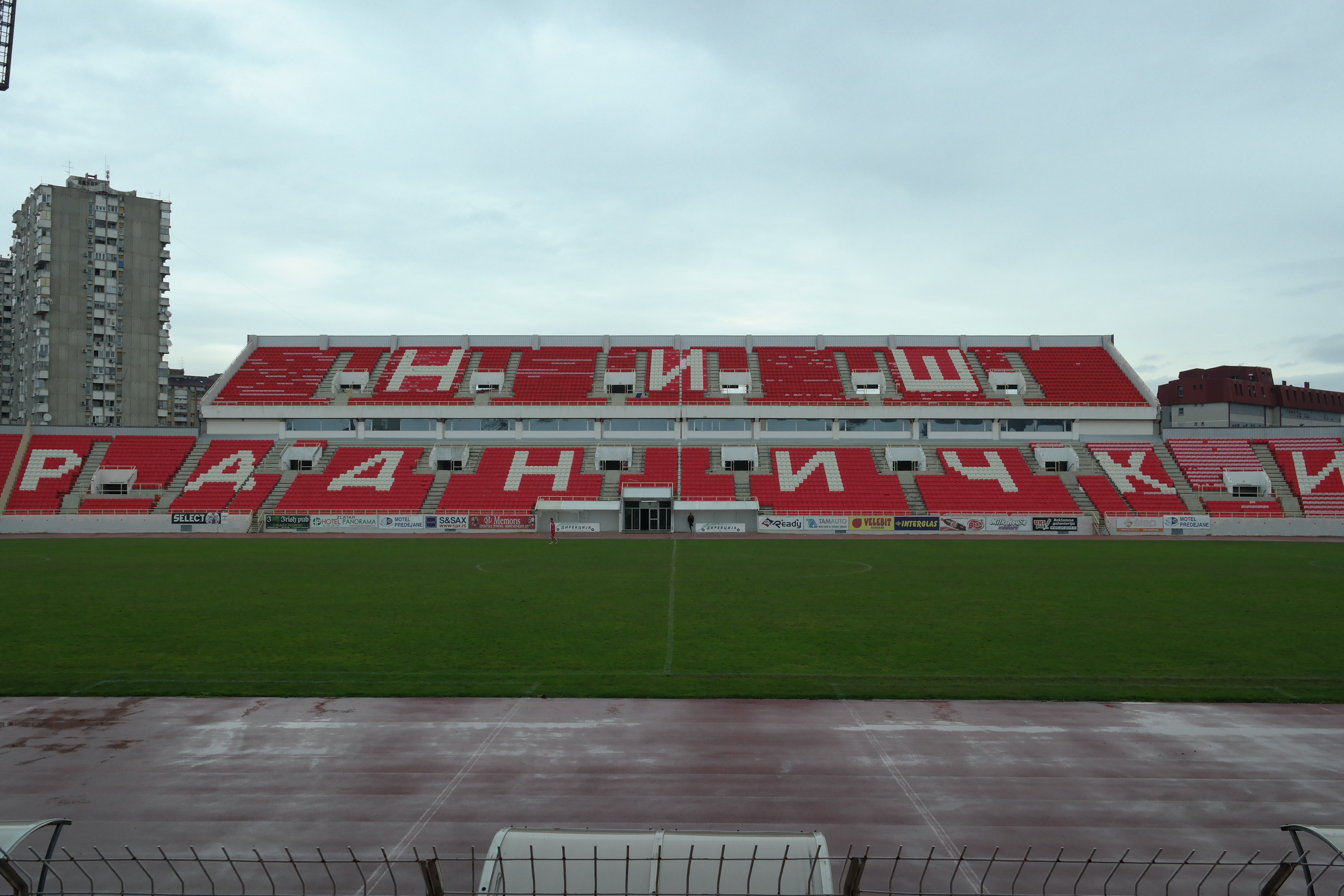
Eastern stand

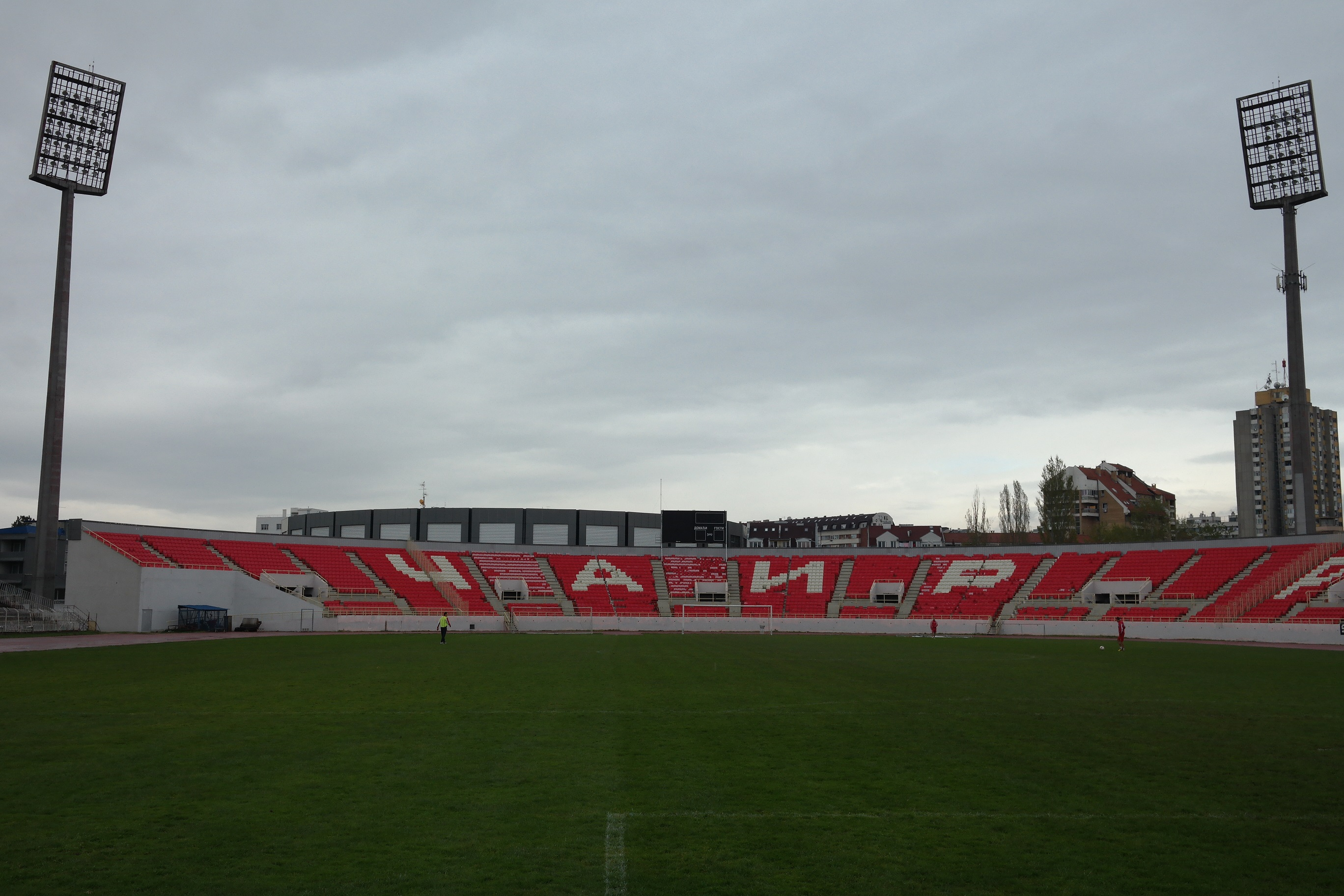
Northern end

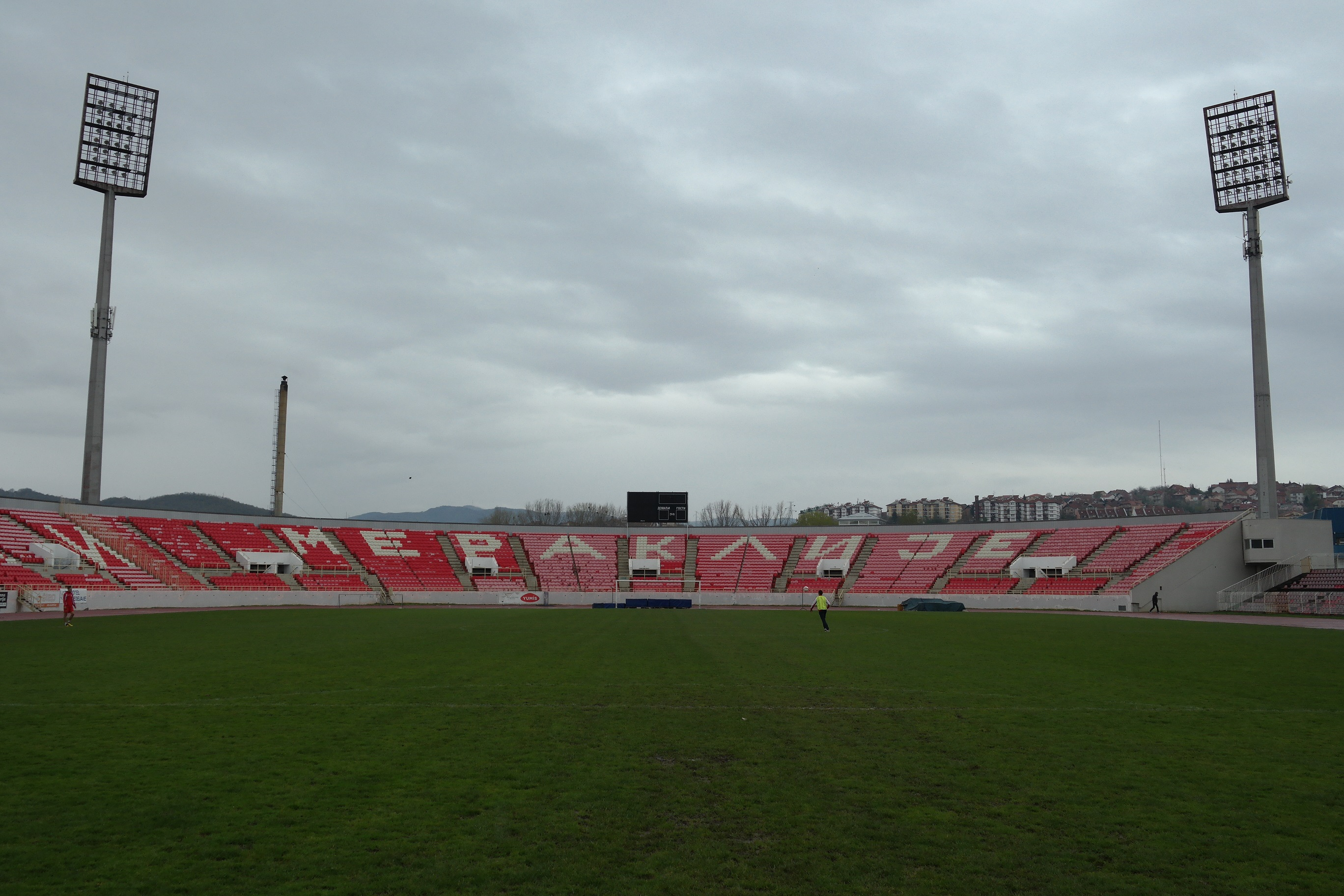
Southern end

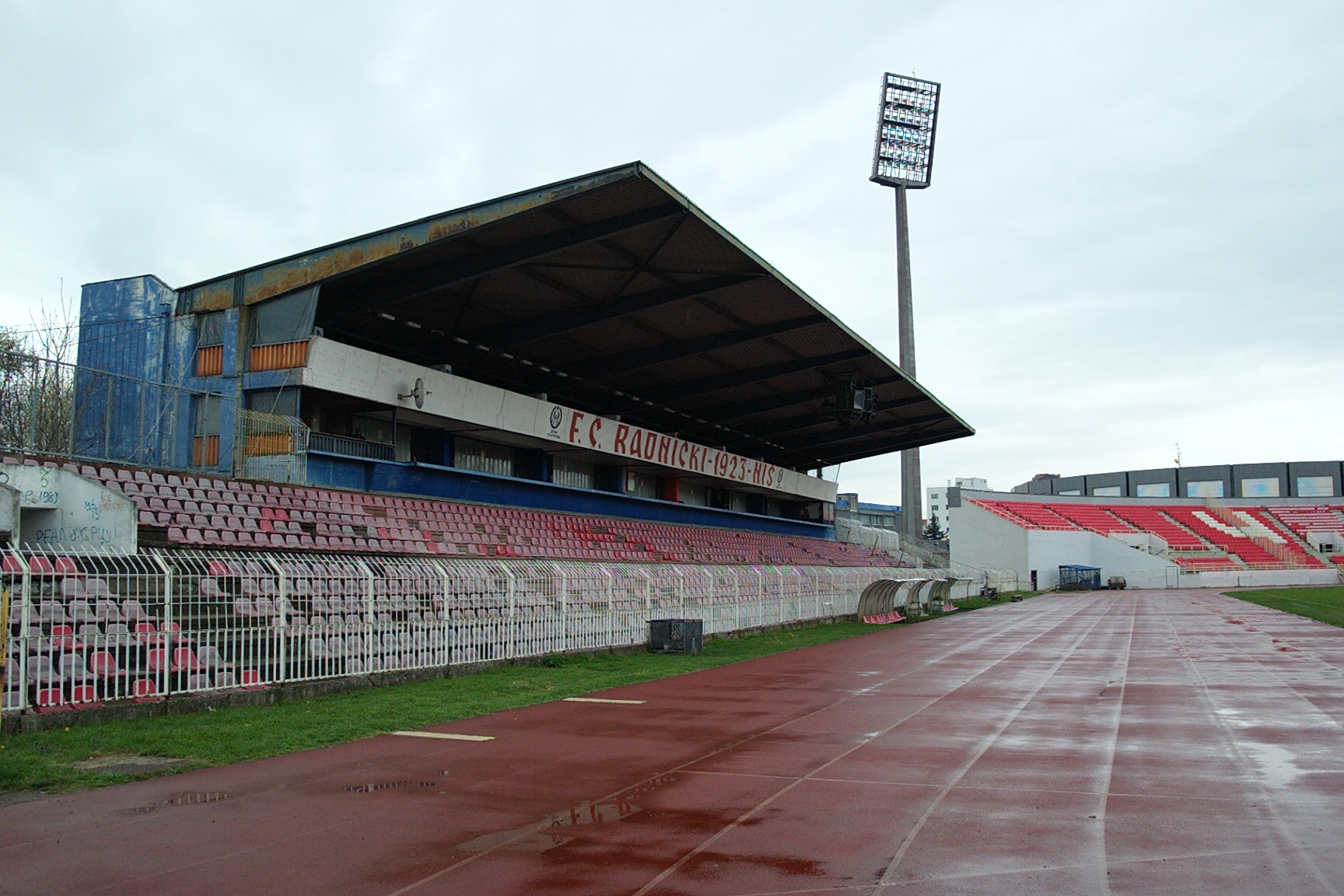
Western side

== See also ==
- List of football stadiums in Serbia
