= Svetozar Vujović =

Personal information
- Date of birth: 3 March 1940
- Place of birth: Baljci, Bileća, Kingdom of Yugoslavia
- Date of death: 16 January 1993 (aged 52)
- Place of death: Sarajevo, Bosnia and Herzegovina
- Position: Defender

Youth career
- 1957–1959: Radnik Hadžići

Senior career*
Years	Team	Apps	(Gls)
1959–1972	Sarajevo	254	(1)

International career
1963–1964	Yugoslavia	8	(0)

Managerial career
- 1973–1974: Sarajevo
- * Club domestic league appearances and goals

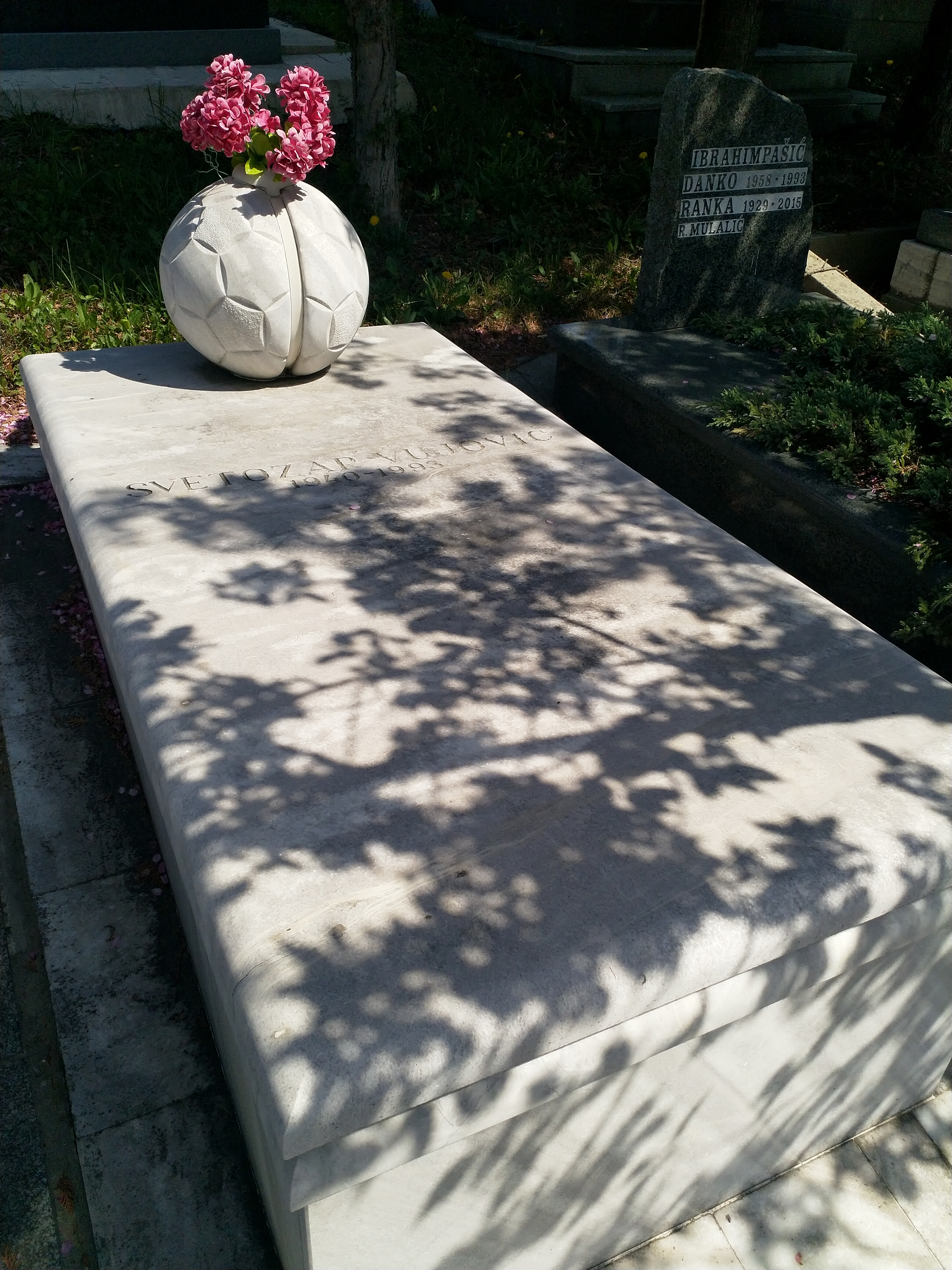
Vujović's grave

Svetozar Vujović (3 March 1940 – 16 January 1993) was a Bosnian and Yugoslav football player and manager, who spent most of his life in the Bosnian capital Sarajevo, and his entire playing, managerial and administrative career with FK Sarajevo. He is the third most capped player in the club's history with 299 official games. After his playing career he went on to manage the team for two years, before taking the position of a long-standing club director, until he died in a besieged city in 1993.

== Playing career ==
=== Club ===
He began playing in 1957 in FK Radnik from the town of Hadžići near Sarajevo, and in 1959 he became a member of the FK Sarajevo. Miroslav Brozović, his coach at the time, put him in the position of right back, and he developed into an excellent football player. Later, he successfully played as a center half.

In the FK Sarajevo jersey he played a total of 444 games, 299 official with 254 in the league, he also scored eight goals along the way. With 299 played official games he is the third most capped player in FK Sarajevo history, behind Ibrahim Biogradlić with 378 and Ihtijarević with 314. Overall number of games (444) places him second on the list of club records, after Biogradlić with 646 games. In his first season with FK Sarajevo 1966/67 he won the title of Yugoslavia champion.

Pathologically afraid of flying, he stopped playing in 1971, officially saying goodbye to the pitch in summer 1972, together with other club player Boško Antić (276 matches and 140 goals) in a match against Sporting CP.

=== International ===
With two games for the young team (1962–1963), he capped eight games for the best selection of Yugoslavia. Debuted in meeting of the Olympic teams against Romania (1:2) in Bucharest on 27 September 1963, and the last game for the national team he played in the Olympic tournament in Japan in Osaka on 22 October 1964, again, against Romania (0:3).

== Administrative career ==
In FK Sarajevo, he began to work as a coach in 1973, and 1975 he was appointed director of the club. In the role of director and later as president Vujović spent twenty years and made great contribution to success and stability of FK Sarajevo.

== Memorial "Svetozar Vujović Salon" ==
Following Svetozar's death in 1993, his club FK Sarajevo named main ceremonial lounge room in their administrative facility, located in downtown Sarajevo, into "Svetozar Vujović Salon" in his honor.
