= Tušanj City Stadium =

Stadium in Tuzla, Bosnia and Herzegovina

Tušanj Stadium
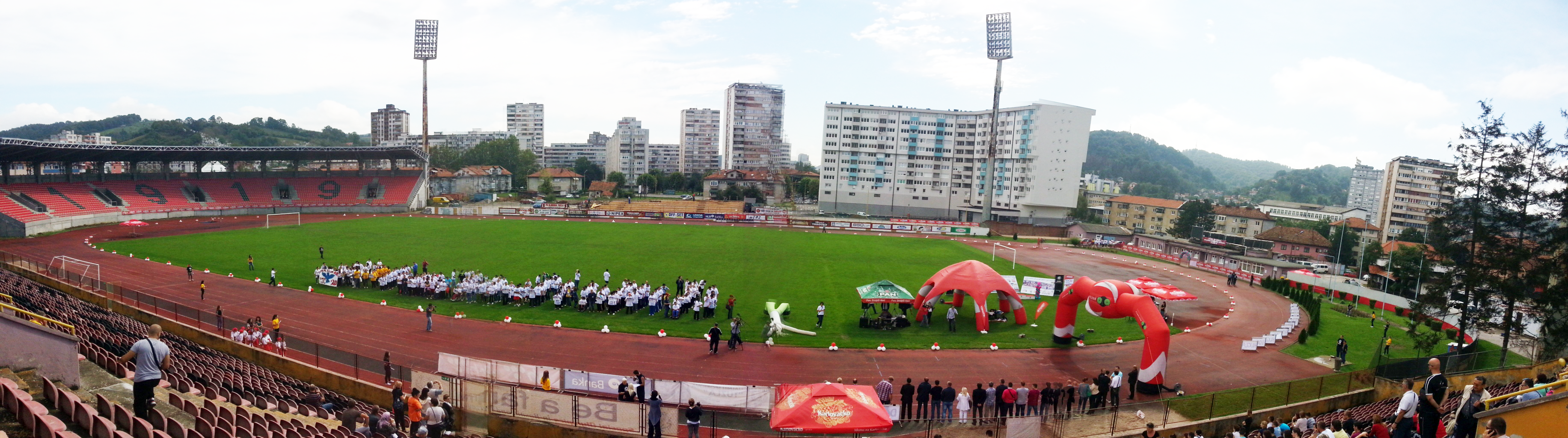
- Interactive map of Tušanj Stadium
- Full name: JU Gradski stadion Tušanj
- Location: Tuzla, Bosnia and Herzegovina
- Capacity: 7,200
- Surface: Hybrid grass
- Scoreboard: LED
- Field size: 105 by 68 metres (114.8 yd × 74.4 yd)

Construction
- Opened: 28 July 1957; 69 years ago
- Renovated: 1979, 2004, 2009, 2023

Tenants
- FK Sloboda Tuzla (1957–present); FK Tuzla City (2018–present)

The Tušanj City Stadium (Bosnian: Gradski stadion Tušanj), commonly known as Tušanj Stadium (Bosnian: Stadion Tušanj) is a multi-purpose stadium in Tuzla, Bosnia and Herzegovina, which is used mostly for football matches and is the home ground of FK Sloboda Tuzla and FK Tuzla City. The stadium has a capacity of around 7,200 seated. The stadium is open to the public from 7:00 to 22:00 for use of the running track. Access to the field is prohibited without permission from the stadium guard. There are two additional stadiums used for player training sessions and private matches.

== International matches ==
On 4 September 2014, it hosted a friendly match of Bosnia and Herzegovina against Liechtenstein and finished with the result 3–0.

#	Date	Competition	Opponent	Score	Att.	Ref
Bosnia and Herzegovina (from 2014)
1.	4 September 2014	Friendly	Liechtenstein	3–0	8,000	
