= Yugoslav football league system =

The Yugoslav football league system refers to the system of interconnected leagues in association football which was in place during the existence of Yugoslavia and organized by the Football Association of Yugoslavia (FSJ).

The exact formats and numbers of levels changed several times, the last time in 1988, when the four inter-republic groups were introduced at third level. The groups were called that way because unlike the fourth tier groups they did not correspond territorially to Yugoslavia's six federal republics.

== The system ==
The following table shows the structure as it was employed in the 1990–91 season, the last season before Slovenian and Croatian clubs departed after their countries declared independence. Bosnian and Macedonian clubs also abandoned the system during and after the following 1991–92 season. Serbia and Montenegro stayed unified as FR Yugoslavia and continued competing together all the way until 2006. The league system structure was kept similar, with the 4 Inter-Republic leagues being replaced by 4 leagues distributed geographically: Montenegrin League, Serbian League East, Serbian League North and Serbian League West.

Lev.	Leagues			
1	First Federal League; 18 clubs – 2 relegations			
2	Second Federal League; 20 clubs – 2 promotions, 4 relegations			
3	Inter-Republic League North; 18 clubs – 1 promotion	Inter-Republic League South; 18 clubs – 1 promotion	Inter-Republic League East; 18 clubs – 1 promotion	Inter-Republic League West; 18 clubs – 1 promotion
4	Bosnia and Herzegovina Republic League; Croatian Republic Football League; Macedonian Republic Football League; Montenegrin Republic League; Serbian Republic Football League; Slovenian Republic Football League; Vojvodina Football League			

== See also ==
- Bosnian football league system
- Croatian football league system
- Serbian football league system
- Kosovo football league system
