= FK Sarajevo records and statistics =

Fudbalski klub Sarajevo (Cyrillic: Фудбалски клуб Сарајево, IPA: [fûdbalskiː klûːb sɑɹəˈjeɪvəʊ]; English: Sarajevo Football Club) is a professional football club based in Sarajevo, the capital city of Bosnia and Herzegovina and is one of the most successful clubs in the country.

This list includes major honours won by FK Sarajevo, records set by the club, its managers and players. The player records section includes details of the club's leading goalscorers and players with the most appearances in first-team competitions.

The club's record appearance maker is Ibrahim Biogradlić, who made 646 appearances between 1951 and 1967. Dobrivoje Živkov is the club's record goalscorer, scoring 212 goals in all competitions (official and unofficial) during his career in FK Sarajevo. The club's top goalscorer in official matches is legendary striker Asim Ferhatović, who found the back of the net on 100 separate occasions (198 in total).

== Honours ==
=== Yugoslavia ===
- Yugoslav First League:
  - Winners (2): 1966–67, 1984–85
  - Runners-up (2): 1964–65, 1979–80
- Yugoslav Cup:
  - Runners-up (2): 1966–67, 1982–83

=== Bosnia and Herzegovina ===
- Premier League of Bosnia and Herzegovina:
  - Winners (5): 1998–1999, 2006–07, 2014–15, 2018–19, 2019–20
  - Runners-up (7): 1994–1995, 1996–1997, 1997–1998, 2005–06, 2010–11, 2012–13, 2020–21
- Bosnia and Herzegovina Football Cup:
  - Winners (8): 1996–1997, 1997–1998, 2001–02, 2004–05, 2013–14, 2018–19, 2020–21, 2024–25
  - Runners-up (4): 1998–1999, 2000–01, 2016–17, 2021–22
- Supercup of Bosnia and Herzegovina:
  - Winners (1): 1997
  - Runners-up (2): 1998, 1999

=== Doubles ===
- Premier League and National Cup: 2018–19

== Player records ==
=== Most appearances ===
Players with most appearances for FK Sarajevo
No.	Name	Years	League	Cup	Europe	Other	Total
1	(Socialist Federal Republic of Yugoslavia) Ibrahim Biogradlić	1951–1967	387	12	6	241	646
2	(Socialist Federal Republic of Yugoslavia) Svetozar Vujović	1959–1972	267	21	7	149	444
3	(Socialist Federal Republic of Yugoslavia) Edhem Šljivo	1968–1978	261	18	12	146	437
4	(Socialist Federal Republic of Yugoslavia) Franjo Lovrić	1947–1959	209	13	0	207	429
5	(Socialist Federal Republic of Yugoslavia) Asim Ferhatović	1952–1967	228	29	12	153	422
6	(Socialist Federal Republic of Yugoslavia) Dobrivoje Živkov	1950–1961	124	14	0	274	412
7	(Socialist Federal Republic of Yugoslavia) Suad Švraka	1947–1960	226	18	4	163	411
8	(Socialist Federal Republic of Yugoslavia) Fahrudin Prljača	1961–1975	275	15	11	105	406
9	(Socialist Federal Republic of Yugoslavia) Fuad Muzurović	1964–1974	172	22	13	198	405
10	(Socialist Federal Republic of Yugoslavia) Mirsad Fazlagić	1961–1972	168	24	18	194	404

=== Top goalscorers - All matches ===
The following is a list of FK Sarajevo top goalscorers in both official and unofficial matches

Top goalscorers for FK Sarajevo in all matches
No.	Name	Years	League	Cup	Europe	Other	Total
1	(Socialist Federal Republic of Yugoslavia) Dobrivoje Živkov	1950–1961	78	29	0	105	212
2	(Socialist Federal Republic of Yugoslavia) Asim Ferhatović	1952–1967	98	25	3	72	198
3	(Socialist Federal Republic of Yugoslavia) Salih Šehović	1954–1965	64	8	0	113	185
4	(Socialist Federal Republic of Yugoslavia) Franjo Lovrić	1947–1959	61	2	0	106	169
5	(Socialist Federal Republic of Yugoslavia) Vahidin Musemić	1965–1974	72	14	3	80	169
6	(Socialist Federal Republic of Yugoslavia) Zijad Arslanagić	1958–1964	62	3	0	103	168
7	(Socialist Federal Republic of Yugoslavia) Boško Antić	1966–1972	75	10	4	51	140
8	(Socialist Federal Republic of Yugoslavia) Boško Prodanović	1963–1973	66	7	1	46	101
9	(Socialist Federal Republic of Yugoslavia) Safet Sušić	1973–1982	53	11	6	26	96
10	(Socialist Federal Republic of Yugoslavia) Edhem Šljivo	1968–1978	41	14	1	35	91

=== Top goalscorers - Official matches ===
The following is a list of FK Sarajevo top goalscorers in official matches

Top goalscorers for FK Sarajevo in official matches
No.	Name	Years	League	Cup	Europe	Total
1	(Socialist Federal Republic of Yugoslavia) Asim Ferhatović	1951–1967	66	34	0	100
2	(Socialist Federal Republic of Yugoslavia) Safet Sušić	1973–1982	81	10	5	96
3	(Socialist Federal Republic of Yugoslavia) Dobrivoje Živkov	1950–1961	83	7	0	90
4	(Bosnia and Herzegovina) Emir Obuća	1996–1998; 2001–2003; 2004–2007; 2010–2012	78	6	6	89
5	(Socialist Federal Republic of Yugoslavia) Vahidin Musemić	1965–1974	72	9	2	83
6	(Socialist Federal Republic of Yugoslavia) Salih Šehović	1958–1964	66	6	3	75
7	(Socialist Federal Republic of Yugoslavia) Boško Antić	1966–1972	58	7	2	67
8	(North Macedonia) Krste Velkoski	2014–2016; 2017–2022	53	10	3	66
8	(Socialist Federal Republic of Yugoslavia) Franjo Lovrić	1963–1973	59	7	0	66
10	(Socialist Federal Republic of Yugoslavia) Husref Musemić	1979–1985; 1989–1990	59	4	1	65

=== Historical goals ===
==== Premier League ====
As of 7 December 2024, Sarajevo have scored 1,158 goals in the Premier League.

Goal	Player	Date	Match
1	(Bosnia and Herzegovina) Džemo Smječanin	3 August 2002	Sarajevo 4–0 Posušje
100	(Bosnia and Herzegovina) Alen Škoro	5 October 2003	Sarajevo 1–1 Željezničar
500	(Bosnia and Herzegovina) Edin Husić	28 April 2012	Sarajevo 3–1 Rudar Prijedor
1,000	(Bosnia and Herzegovina) Hamza Čataković	20 March 2022	Sarajevo 6–0 Pošusje

== Season by season ==
Season by Season statistics from the club's foundation to the present.

=== Games ===
Season	Player	League	Cup	Europe	Total
1946	(Socialist Federal Republic of Yugoslavia) Anton Vlajčić				7
1947–48	(Socialist Federal Republic of Yugoslavia) Lav Mantula	38		0	38
1948–49	(Socialist Federal Republic of Yugoslavia) Đuka Lovrić	39		0	39
1950	(Socialist Federal Republic of Yugoslavia) Franjo Lovrić	35		0	35
1951	(Socialist Federal Republic of Yugoslavia) Safet Alajbegović	38		0	38
1952	(Socialist Federal Republic of Yugoslavia) Dobrivoje Živkov	31		0	31
1952–53	(Socialist Federal Republic of Yugoslavia) Anton Agošton	43		0	43
1953–54	(Socialist Federal Republic of Yugoslavia) Mladen Stipić	46		0	46
1954–55	(Socialist Federal Republic of Yugoslavia) Ibrahim Biogradlić	55		0	55
1955–56	(Socialist Federal Republic of Yugoslavia) Dobrivoje Živkov	46		0	46
1956–57	(Socialist Federal Republic of Yugoslavia) Ibrahim Biogradlić	22		0	22
1957–58	(Socialist Federal Republic of Yugoslavia) Nerćes Novo	50		0	50
1958–59	(Socialist Federal Republic of Yugoslavia) Ibrahim Biogradlić	42		0	42
1959–60	(Socialist Federal Republic of Yugoslavia) Ibrahim Biogradlić				45
1960–61	(Socialist Federal Republic of Yugoslavia) Zijad Arslanagić	46			46
1961–62	(Socialist Federal Republic of Yugoslavia) Ibrahim Biogradlić	53			53
1962–63	(Socialist Federal Republic of Yugoslavia) Ibrahim Biogradlić	52			52
1963–64	(Socialist Federal Republic of Yugoslavia) Sreten Šiljkut	55			55
1964–65	(Socialist Federal Republic of Yugoslavia) Sreten Šiljkut	57			57
1965–66	(Socialist Federal Republic of Yugoslavia) Boško Antić	56			56
1966–67	(Socialist Federal Republic of Yugoslavia) Fahrudin Prljača	58			58
1967–68	(Socialist Federal Republic of Yugoslavia) Boško Antić			4	53
1968–69	(Socialist Federal Republic of Yugoslavia) Fuad Muzurović	55		0	55
1969–70	(Socialist Federal Republic of Yugoslavia) Edhem Šljivo	56		0	56
1970–71	(Socialist Federal Republic of Yugoslavia) Fuad Muzurović	47		0	47
1971–72	(Socialist Federal Republic of Yugoslavia) Edhem Šljivo	47		0	47
1972–73	(Socialist Federal Republic of Yugoslavia) Dragoljub Simić	49		0	49
1973–74	(Socialist Federal Republic of Yugoslavia) Ranko Petković	32			56
1974–75	(Socialist Federal Republic of Yugoslavia) Dragoljub Simić	52		0	52
1975–76	(Socialist Federal Republic of Yugoslavia) Edhem Šljivo	33		0	33
1976–77	(Socialist Federal Republic of Yugoslavia) Srebrenko Repčić	33	1	0	34
1977–78	(Socialist Federal Republic of Yugoslavia) Srebrenko Repčić	34		0	34
1978–79	(Socialist Federal Republic of Yugoslavia) Srebrenko Repčić	34			34
1979–80	(Socialist Federal Republic of Yugoslavia) Želimir Vidović	39			39
1980–81	(Socialist Federal Republic of Yugoslavia) Nijaz Ferhatović	32	1		33
1981–82	(Socialist Federal Republic of Yugoslavia) Faruk Hadžibegić	32			32
1982–83	(Socialist Federal Republic of Yugoslavia) Faruk Hadžibegić	32			32
1983–84	(Socialist Federal Republic of Yugoslavia) Davor Jozić	31		0	31
1984–85	(Socialist Federal Republic of Yugoslavia) Đurković, Hadžibegić	34		0	34
1985–86	(Socialist Federal Republic of Yugoslavia) Dragan Jakovljević	33			33
1986–87	(Socialist Federal Republic of Yugoslavia) Dragan Jakovljević	33		0	33
1987–88	(Socialist Federal Republic of Yugoslavia) Dragan Jakovljević	30		0	30
1988–89	(Socialist Federal Republic of Yugoslavia) Boban Božović	25		0	25
1989–90	(Socialist Federal Republic of Yugoslavia) Boban Božović	31		0	31
1990–91	(Socialist Federal Republic of Yugoslavia) Risto Vidaković	35		0	35
1991–92	(Socialist Federal Republic of Yugoslavia) Risto Vidaković			0	
1993–94	(Bosnia and Herzegovina) Geca, Valentić, Repuh	0	0	0	
1994–95	Unknown			0	
1995–96	(Bosnia and Herzegovina) Uščuplić, Herco	28		0	28
1996–97	(Bosnia and Herzegovina) Dženan Uščuplić	29	5	0	34
1997–98	(Bosnia and Herzegovina) Mirsad Dedić	27	5	0	32
1998–99	(Bosnia and Herzegovina) Mirsad Dedić			2	34
1999–2000	(Bosnia and Herzegovina) Almedin Hota	28		0	28
2000–01	(Bosnia and Herzegovina) Džemal Berberović	38	2	0	40
2001–02	(Bosnia and Herzegovina) Edin Šaranović	38		1	39
2002–03	(Bosnia and Herzegovina) Džemal Berberović			4	41
2003–04	(Bosnia and Herzegovina) Alen Škoro	24		0	24
2004–05	(Bosnia and Herzegovina) Faruk Ihtijarević	26		0	26
2005–06	(Bosnia and Herzegovina) Vule Trivunović	28		0	28
2006–07	(Bosnia and Herzegovina) Faruk Ihtijarević	27		4	31
2007–08	(Bosnia and Herzegovina) Admir Raščić	27		6	33
2008–09	(Bosnia and Herzegovina) Muhamed Alaim	28		0	28
2009–10	(Serbia) Zoran Belošević	30	3	6	39
2010–11	(Bosnia and Herzegovina) Alen Avdić	27	4	0	31
2011–12	(Bosnia and Herzegovina) Nermin Haskić	30	5	4	39
2012–13	(Serbia) Ivan Tatomirović	29	3	6	38
2013–14	(Bosnia and Herzegovina) Dupovac, Cimirot, (Serbia) Tatomirović	26	8	4	38
2014–15	(North Macedonia) Krste Velkoski	14	3	6	23
2015–16	(Croatia) Tomislav Barbarić	17	3	2	22
2016–17	(Bosnia and Herzegovina) Mersudin Ahmetović	30	8	0	38
2017–18	(Serbia) Bojan Pavlović	32	1	2	35
2018–19	(North Macedonia) Krste Velkoski	31	8	4	43
2019–20	(Bosnia and Herzegovina) Kovačević, Šerbečić	20	1	4	25
2020–21	(Bosnia and Herzegovina) Vladan Kovačević	29	4	4	37
2021–22	(Bosnia and Herzegovina) Belmin Dizdarević	31	7	0	38
2022–23	(Bosnia and Herzegovina) Dal Varešanović	30	1	0	31
2023–24	(Bosnia and Herzegovina) Hamza Čataković	33	4	1	38
2024–25	(Ghana) Francis Kyeremeh	30	7	4	41
2025–26	(Croatia) Mihael Kuprešak	33	4	2	39

=== Goals ===
Season	Player	League	Cup	Europe	Total
1946	(Socialist Federal Republic of Yugoslavia) Nerćes Novo	6	0	0	6
1947–48	(Socialist Federal Republic of Yugoslavia) Mile Novaković	21	0	0	24
1948–49	(Socialist Federal Republic of Yugoslavia) Franjo Lovrić	19	2	0	21
1949–50	(Socialist Federal Republic of Yugoslavia) Franjo Lovrić	22	3	0	25
1950–51	(Socialist Federal Republic of Yugoslavia) Drago Žigman	19	0	0	19
1951–52	(Socialist Federal Republic of Yugoslavia) Dobrivoje Živkov	21	3	0	24
1952–53	(Socialist Federal Republic of Yugoslavia) Dobrivoje Živkov	28	0	0	28
1953–54	(Socialist Federal Republic of Yugoslavia) Dobrivoje Živkov	19	0	0	19
1954–55	(Socialist Federal Republic of Yugoslavia) Dobrivoje Živkov	31	0	0	31
1955–56	(Socialist Federal Republic of Yugoslavia) Asim Ferhatović	28	2	0	30
1956–57	(Socialist Federal Republic of Yugoslavia) Asim Ferhatović	28	1	0	29
1957–58	(Socialist Federal Republic of Yugoslavia) Salih Šehović	36	26	0	62
1958–59	(Socialist Federal Republic of Yugoslavia) Zijad Arslanagić	21	0	0	21
1959–60	(Socialist Federal Republic of Yugoslavia) Zijad Arslanagić	35	3	0	38
1960–61	(Socialist Federal Republic of Yugoslavia) Zijad Arslanagić	26	0	0	26
1961–62	(Socialist Federal Republic of Yugoslavia) Zijad Arslanagić	25	0	0	25
1962–63	(Socialist Federal Republic of Yugoslavia) Zijad Arslanagić	20	5	0	25
1963–64	(Socialist Federal Republic of Yugoslavia) Džemaludin Mušović	21	7	0	28
1964–65	(Socialist Federal Republic of Yugoslavia) Džemaludin Mušović	27	5	0	32
1965–66	(Socialist Federal Republic of Yugoslavia) Boško Antić	23	3	0	26
1966–67	(Socialist Federal Republic of Yugoslavia) Boško Antić	21	9	0	30
1967–68	(Socialist Federal Republic of Yugoslavia) Boško Antić	23	27	3	53
1968–69	(Socialist Federal Republic of Yugoslavia) Boško Prodanović	18	0	0	18
1969–70	(Socialist Federal Republic of Yugoslavia) Vahidin Musemić	23	0	0	23
1970–71	(Socialist Federal Republic of Yugoslavia) Vahidin Musemić	23	0	0	23
1971–72	(Socialist Federal Republic of Yugoslavia) Vahidin Musemić	25	0	0	25
1972–73	(Socialist Federal Republic of Yugoslavia) Džemil Cerić	17	0	0	24
1973–74	(Socialist Federal Republic of Yugoslavia) Ranko Petković	16	8	0	24
1974–75	(Socialist Federal Republic of Yugoslavia) Safet Sušić	20		0	20
1975–76	(Socialist Federal Republic of Yugoslavia) Edhem Šljivo	14	1	0	15
1976–77	(Socialist Federal Republic of Yugoslavia) Safet Sušić	9	3	0	12
1977–78	(Socialist Federal Republic of Yugoslavia) Radomir Savić	21	0	0	21
1978–79	(Socialist Federal Republic of Yugoslavia) Safet Sušić	15	0	0	15
1979–80	(Socialist Federal Republic of Yugoslavia) Safet Sušić	17	0	0	17
1980–81	(Socialist Federal Republic of Yugoslavia) Husref Musemić	11	1	0	12
1981–82	(Socialist Federal Republic of Yugoslavia) Predrag Pašić	12	3	0	15
1982–83	(Socialist Federal Republic of Yugoslavia) Safet Sušić	9	2	3	14
1983–84	(Socialist Federal Republic of Yugoslavia) Husref Musemić	9	2	0	11
1984–85	(Socialist Federal Republic of Yugoslavia) Husref Musemić	19	0	0	19
1985–86	(Socialist Federal Republic of Yugoslavia) Dragan Jakovljević	10	1	0	11
1986–87	(Socialist Federal Republic of Yugoslavia) Dragan Jakovljević	15	1	0	16
1987–88	(Socialist Federal Republic of Yugoslavia) Dragan Jakovljević	11	1	0	12
1988–89	(Socialist Federal Republic of Yugoslavia) Boban Božović	10	3	0	13
1989–90	(Socialist Federal Republic of Yugoslavia) Boban Božović	10	3	0	13
1990–91	(Socialist Federal Republic of Yugoslavia) Kuprešanin, Nedić	8		0	8
1991–92	Unknown	n/a	n/a	n/a	n/a
1993–94	(Bosnia and Herzegovina) Elvir Baljić	15	0	0	15
1994–95	(Bosnia and Herzegovina) Elvir Baljić	8	0	0	8
1995–96	(Bosnia and Herzegovina) Reuf Herco	8	1	0	9
1996–97	(Bosnia and Herzegovina) Smječanin, Uščuplić	11	5	0	17
1997–98	(Bosnia and Herzegovina) Alen Avdić	14	0	0	14
1998–99	(Bosnia and Herzegovina) Džemo Smječanin	14	0	0	14
1999–2000	(Bosnia and Herzegovina) Almedin Hota	9	0	0	9
2000–01	(Bosnia and Herzegovina) Edin Šaranović	18	2	0	20
2001–02	(Bosnia and Herzegovina) Edin Šaranović	12	0	0	12
2002–03	(Bosnia and Herzegovina) Emir Obuća	24	1	2	27
2003–04	(Bosnia and Herzegovina) Alen Škoro	20	0	0	20
2004–05	(Bosnia and Herzegovina) Emir Obuća	7	5	0	12
2005–06	(Bosnia and Herzegovina) Alen Avdić	9	4	0	13
2006–07	(Bosnia and Herzegovina) Emir Obuća	6	3	4	13
2007–08	(Bosnia and Herzegovina) Haris Handžić	7	2	0	9
2008–09	(Bosnia and Herzegovina) Admir Raščić	9	0	0	9
2009–10	(Bosnia and Herzegovina) Alen Škoro	13	0	0	13
2010–11	(Bosnia and Herzegovina) Emir Obuća	8	0	0	8
2011–12	(Bosnia and Herzegovina) Nermin Haskić	8	1	2	11
2012–13	(Bosnia and Herzegovina) Emir Hadžić	20	3	3	26
2013–14	(Serbia) Nikola Komazec	10	4	0	14
2014–15	(North Macedonia) Krste Velkoski	7	2	2	11
2015–16	(Croatia) Leon Benko	18	4	0	22
2016–17	(Bosnia and Herzegovina) Mersudin Ahmetović	10	2	0	12
2017–18	(Bosnia and Herzegovina) Mersudin Ahmetović	14	0	0	14
2018–19	(Bosnia and Herzegovina) Mersudin Ahmetović	14	0	2	16
2019–20	(Bosnia and Herzegovina) Mersudin Ahmetović	13	0	0	13
2020–21	(Bosnia and Herzegovina) Tatar, (England) Fanimo	10	0	3	13
2021–22	(Bosnia and Herzegovina) Varešanović, Čataković, Suljić	4	1	0	5
2022–23	(Brazil) Renan Oliveira	9	0	0	9
2023–24	(Bosnia and Herzegovina) Hamza Čataković	17	2	0	19
2024–25	(Georgia (country)) Giorgi Guliashvili	16	4	1	21
2025–26	(North Macedonia) Agon Elezi	9	0	0	9

== Individual awards ==
=== Domestic ===
Yugoslav First League top scorers

Season	Name	Goals
1963-64	(Socialist Federal Republic of Yugoslavia) Asim Ferhatović	19
1977-78	(Socialist Federal Republic of Yugoslavia) Radomir Savić	21
1979-80	(Socialist Federal Republic of Yugoslavia) Safet Sušić	27

Premier League of Bosnia and Herzegovina top scorers

Season	Name	Goals
2002–03	(Bosnia and Herzegovina) Emir Obuća	24
2003–04	(Bosnia and Herzegovina) Alen Škoro	20
2012–13	(Bosnia and Herzegovina) Emir Hadžić	20
2015–16	(Croatia) Leon Benko	18
2019–20	(Bosnia and Herzegovina) Mersudin Ahmetović	13

Yugoslav Footballer of the Year (Socialist Federal Republic of Yugoslavia)

- (Socialist Federal Republic of Yugoslavia) Safet Sušić (1979, 1980)
- (Socialist Federal Republic of Yugoslavia) Predrag Pašić (1985)

Premier League of Bosnia and Herzegovina player of the year

- (Bosnia and Herzegovina) Emir Hadžić (2012), (Bosnia and Herzegovina) Mersudin Ahmetović (2019), (Georgia (country)) Giorgi Guliashvili (2025)

Young Footballer of the Year in Bosnia and Herzegovina

- (Bosnia and Herzegovina) Haris Handžić (2009), (Bosnia and Herzegovina) Nihad Mujakić (2019), (Bosnia and Herzegovina) Dal Varešanović (2023) (Bosnia and Herzegovina) Muhamed Buljubašić (2024)

Premier League of Bosnia and Herzegovina goalkeeper of the year

- (Bosnia and Herzegovina) Muhamed Alaim (2009), * (Bosnia and Herzegovina) Vladan Kovačević (2019)

Sportske novosti Yellow Shirt award (Socialist Federal Republic of Yugoslavia)

- (Socialist Federal Republic of Yugoslavia) Safet Sušić (1979)
- (Socialist Federal Republic of Yugoslavia) Predrag Pašić (1985)

=== International ===
UEFA Euro 1968 team of the tournament

- (Socialist Federal Republic of Yugoslavia) Mirsad Fazlagić (1968)

Bosnia and Herzegovina's UEFA Golden Jubilee inductee

- (Bosnia and Herzegovina) Safet Sušić

Bosnia and Herzegovina managers

- (Bosnia and Herzegovina) Fuad Muzurović (1995–1997)
- (Bosnia and Herzegovina) Džemaludin Mušović (1998–1999)
- (Bosnia and Herzegovina) Faruk Hadžibegić (1999)
- (Bosnia and Herzegovina) Fuad Muzurović (2006–2007)
- (Bosnia and Herzegovina) Meho Kodro (2008)
- (Bosnia and Herzegovina) Denijal Pirić (2008)
- (Croatia) Miroslav Blažević (2008–2009)
- (Bosnia and Herzegovina) Safet Sušić (2009–2014)

=== Other national team managers ===
- (Socialist Federal Republic of Yugoslavia) Vojin Božović (1964–1965) – Libya
- (Socialist Federal Republic of Yugoslavia) Abdulah Gegić (1969–1970) – Turkey
- (Socialist Federal Republic of Yugoslavia) Miroslav Blažević (1976–1977) – Switzerland
- (Socialist Federal Republic of Yugoslavia) Boško Antić (1987–1988) – Togo
- (Socialist Federal Republic of Yugoslavia) (Bosnia and Herzegovina) Džemaludin Mušović (1990–1995) – Qatar
- Miroslav Blažević (1994–2000) – Croatia
- (Croatia) Miroslav Blažević (2001) – Iran
- (Bosnia and Herzegovina) Džemaludin Mušović (2004–2007) – Qatar
- (Bosnia and Herzegovina) Vladimir Petković (2014–present) – Switzerland

=== Players who have played for the national team in international competitions ===
Name	National team	Appearances
Mersudin Ahmetović	(Bosnia and Herzegovina) Bosnia & Herzegovina	2
Almir Bekić	(Bosnia and Herzegovina) Bosnia & Herzegovina	1
Boško Antić	(Socialist Federal Republic of Yugoslavia) Yugoslavia	1
Alen Avdić	(Bosnia and Herzegovina) Bosnia & Herzegovina	3
Zijad Arslanagić	(Socialist Federal Republic of Yugoslavia) Yugoslavia	1
Milenko Bajić	(Socialist Federal Republic of Yugoslavia) Yugoslavia	1
Džemal Berberović	(Bosnia and Herzegovina) Bosnia & Herzegovina	33
Ibrahim Biogradlić	(Socialist Federal Republic of Yugoslavia) Yugoslavia	1
Gojko Cimirot	(Bosnia and Herzegovina) Bosnia & Herzegovina	2
Mirsad Dedić	(Bosnia and Herzegovina) Bosnia & Herzegovina	32
Samir Duro	(Bosnia and Herzegovina) Bosnia & Herzegovina	7
Haris Duljević	(Bosnia and Herzegovina) Bosnia & Herzegovina	5
Predrag Pašić	(Socialist Federal Republic of Yugoslavia) Yugoslavia	11
Giorgi Guliashvili	(Georgia (country)) Georgia	6
Emir Granov	(Bosnia and Herzegovina) Bosnia & Herzegovina	7
Faruk Hadžibegić	(Socialist Federal Republic of Yugoslavia) Yugoslavia	61
Haris Handžić	(Bosnia and Herzegovina) Bosnia & Herzegovina	2
Adis Jahović	North Macedonia	10
Ahmad Kallasi	Syria	5
Mirza Kapetanović	(Socialist Federal Republic of Yugoslavia) Yugoslavia	6
Sead Kapetanović	(Bosnia and Herzegovina) Bosnia & Herzegovina	15
Davor Jozić	(Socialist Federal Republic of Yugoslavia) Yugoslavia	27
Lev Mantula	(Socialist Federal Republic of Yugoslavia) Yugoslavia	1
Ninoslav Milenković	(Bosnia and Herzegovina) Bosnia & Herzegovina	15
Semjon Milošević	(Bosnia and Herzegovina) Bosnia & Herzegovina	1
Milenko Bajić	(Socialist Federal Republic of Yugoslavia) Yugoslavia	1
Alen Škoro	(Bosnia and Herzegovina) Bosnia & Herzegovina	4
Džemo Smječanin	(Bosnia and Herzegovina) Bosnia & Herzegovina	1
Safet Sušić	(Socialist Federal Republic of Yugoslavia) Yugoslavia	54
Ivan Sesar	(Bosnia and Herzegovina) Bosnia & Herzegovina	2
Admir Raščić	(Bosnia and Herzegovina) Bosnia & Herzegovina	2
Srebrenko Repčić	(Socialist Federal Republic of Yugoslavia) Yugoslavia	1
Senad Repuh	(Bosnia and Herzegovina) Bosnia & Herzegovina	14
Faruk Ihtijarević	(Bosnia and Herzegovina) Bosnia & Herzegovina	11
Krste Velkoski	North Macedonia	7
Mirza Varešanović	(Bosnia and Herzegovina) Bosnia & Herzegovina	11
Zijad Švrakić	(Socialist Federal Republic of Yugoslavia) Yugoslavia	2

== Managerial records ==
- First manager: Josip Bulat, served from October 1946 to November 1947.
- First foreign manager: László Fenyvesi, served from August to January 1958.
- Longest-serving manager: Miroslav Brozović, served from September 1948 to June 1956 (8 years).
- Shortest-serving non-interim manager: Ljupko Petrović, served from 8 April 2014 to 10 April 2014 (2 days).
- Only player-manager in club history: Miroslav Brozović, 1948–49; 1950–51
- Managers that won the title both as players and managers: Boško Antić (1967; 1985) and Husref Musemić (1985; 2007, 2019).
- Most tenures as manager: Srboljub Markušević, (1969–1971; 1972–1973; 1981–1983) Fuad Muzurović, (1977–1981; 1991–1996; 2001–2002) (3) Husref Musemić, (2001; 2002–2003; 2005–2008; 2013; 2017–2019) (5)
- Manager with most wins in one season: Boško Antić, 1984–85 (19)
- Manager with fewest wins in one season: Slavko Zagorac, 1947–48 (2)
- Manager with most appearances in European competitions: Husref Musemić, (22)

== Record departures ==
Rank	Pos.	Player	To	Fee	Year	Ref.
1	DF	(Bosnia and Herzegovina) Nidal Čelik	(France) Lens	€2,500,000	2025	
1	FW	(Georgia (country)) Giorgi Guliashvili	(Spain) Racing de Santander	€2,500,000	2026	
3	MF	(The Gambia) Momodou Jatta	(United Arab Emirates) Al Jazira	€1,800,000	2025	
4	MF	(Bosnia and Herzegovina) Gojko Cimirot	(Greece) PAOK	€1,680,000	2015	
5	MF	(Bosnia and Herzegovina) Muhamed Buljubašić	(Turkey) Çaykur Rizespor	€1,500,000	2024	
6	FW	(Colombia) Kevin Viveros	(Colombia) Atlético Nacional	€1,210,000	2025	
7	MF	(Bosnia and Herzegovina) Dal Varešanović	(Turkey) Çaykur Rizespor	€1,200,000	2023	
8	DF	(Bosnia and Herzegovina) Nihad Mujakić	(Belgium) Kortrijk	€1,100,000	2019	
9	DF	(Bosnia and Herzegovina) Nermin Mujkić	(United Arab Emirates) Al Jazira	€1,000,000	2026	
10	MF	(Montenegro) Vladan Bubanja	(Russia) Orenburg	€840,000	2025	

== Homegrown players in notable clubs ==
Name	Nationality	Club	Year
Elvir Baljić	(Bosnia and Herzegovina)	(Spain) Real Madrid	1999–2002
Sead Kapetanović	(Bosnia and Herzegovina)	(Germany) Borussia Dortmund	1999–2001
Mirza Varešanović	(Bosnia and Herzegovina)	(France) Bordeaux	1995–1997
Džemal Berberović	(Bosnia and Herzegovina)	(Germany) Bayer Leverkusen	2003–2005
Emir Granov	(Bosnia and Herzegovina)	(Spain) Rayo Vallecano	2001–2002
Alen Škoro	(Bosnia and Herzegovina)	(France) Olympique Marseille	2000–2002
Safet Sušić	(Socialist Federal Republic of Yugoslavia)	(France) Paris Saint-Germain	1982–1991
Faruk Hadžibegić	(Socialist Federal Republic of Yugoslavia)	(Spain) Real Betis	1985–1987
Ante Rajković	(Socialist Federal Republic of Yugoslavia)	(Wales) Swansea City	1981–1985
Predrag Pašić	(Socialist Federal Republic of Yugoslavia)	(Germany) Stuttgart	1985–1987
Zijad Švrakić	(Socialist Federal Republic of Yugoslavia)	(Turkey) Galatasaray	1989–1991
Dragan Jakovljević	(Socialist Federal Republic of Yugoslavia)	(France) Nantes	1989–1991
Dejan Raičković	(Socialist Federal Republic of Yugoslavia)	(Germany) Hannover 96	1992–1994
Miloš Đurković	(Socialist Federal Republic of Yugoslavia)	(Turkey) Beşiktaş	1986–1987
Risto Vidaković	(Socialist Federal Republic of Yugoslavia)	(Spain) Real Betis	1994–2000
Vahidin Musemić	(Socialist Federal Republic of Yugoslavia)	(France) OGC Nice	1980–1983
Boris Živković	(Croatia)	(Germany) Bayer Leverkusen	1997–2003
Murat Šaran	(Socialist Federal Republic of Yugoslavia)	(Spain) Levante	1979–1981
Davor Jozić	(Socialist Federal Republic of Yugoslavia)	(Italy) Cesena	1987–1993

== All-Time First Yugoslav League Table ==
Top 11 only:

MP = Matches played; W = Matches won; D = Matches drawn; L = Matches lost; GF = Goals for; GA = Goals against; GD = Goal difference; P = Points;HF = Highest finish

Rank	Club	MP	W	D	L	GF	GA	GD	P
1	Red Star Belgrade	1335	719	328	288	2560	1415	+1145	1766
2	Partizan Belgrade	1335	657	354	324	2285	1428	+857	1668
3	Dinamo Zagreb	1302	597	366	339	2151	1495	+1006	1560
4	Hajduk Split	1302	587	346	369	2088	1486	+602	1520
5	Vojvodina	1221	465	311	445	1670	1595	+75	1241
6	Sarajevo	1228	447	311	470	1674	1773	-99	1205
7	Velež Mostar	1174	435	309	430	1668	1615	+53	1179
8	Željezničar	1063	403	274	386	1456	1424	+32	1080
9	OFK Belgrade	977	343	281	353	1355	1355	0	967
10	Radnički Niš	979	339	250	390	1088	1244	-156	928
11	Vardar Skopje	1005	328	251	426	1195	1459	-264	907

== All time table of Premier League of Bosnia and Herzegovina ==
Counting only since the 2002–03 season, the season the league became a unified country-wide league.
As of the end of the 2023–24 season. Teams in bold are part of the 2024–25 season.

Ssn = Number of seasons; Pld = Matches played; W = Matches won; D = Matches drawn; L = Matches lost; GF = Goals for; GA = Goals against; GD = Goal difference; Pts = Points; HF = Highest finish

Rank	Club	Town	Ssn	Pld	W	D	L	GF	GA	GD	Pts	HF
1	**Zrinjski**	Mostar	22	679	382	120	177	1,117	662	+455	1,265 (-1)	1
2	**Sarajevo**	Sarajevo	22	679	358	161	160	1,118	609	+509	1,232 (-3)	1
3	**Željezničar**	Sarajevo	22	679	347	151	181	1,018	627	+391	1,192	1
4	**Široki Brijeg**	Široki Brijeg	22	679	323	165	191	1,016	673	+343	1,134	1
5	**Borac**	Banja Luka	18	554	268	102	184	729	566	+163	906 (-1)	1
6	**Sloboda**	Tuzla	19	586	216	127	243	622	673	−51	775	2
7	Čelik	Zenica	18	547	195	134	218	609	669	−60	716 (-3)	3
8	**Velež**	Mostar	16	492	182	114	196	592	603	−11	657 (-3)	3
9	Leotar	Trebinje	14	434	167	65	202	504	617	−113	566	1
10	Slavija	Istočno Sarajevo	12	360	137	65	158	416	493	−77	476 (-3)	2
11	Travnik	Travnik	12	360	122	64	174	422	538	−116	430	5
12	**Radnik**	Bijeljina	12	365	109	98	158	372	478	−106	425	5
13	**Posušje**	Posušje	10	317	113	63	141	360	473	−113	402	5
14	Olimpik	Sarajevo	9	275	100	67	108	309	333	−24	367	5
15	Modriča	Modriča	7	210	87	34	89	298	290	+8	295	1
16	Orašje	Orašje	7	218	85	33	100	307	325	−18	288	7
17	Zvijezda	Gradačac	7	210	70	49	91	248	304	−56	259	7
18	Tuzla City	Tuzla	6	187	64	48	75	232	259	−27	240	2
19	Rudar (P)	Prijedor	7	213	57	56	100	207	286	−79	227	10
20	Žepče	Žepče	6	188	62	32	94	192	274	−82	218	8
21	Mladost (DK)	Doboj, Kakanj	6	182	53	50	79	196	265	−69	209	6
22	Jedinstvo	Bihać	4	128	53	14	61	171	203	−32	173	7
23	**GOŠK**	Gabela	5	158	41	42	75	148	239	−91	165	7
24	Vitez	Vitez	5	154	39	34	81	126	210	−84	151	9
25	Krupa	Krupa na Vrbasu	4	130	37	36	57	141	170	−29	147	4
26	Budućnost	Banovići	4	128	39	21	68	139	199	−60	138	8
27	Laktaši	Laktaši	3	90	35	14	41	122	125	−3	119	8
28	Rudar (U)	Ugljevik	3	98	34	14	50	118	143	−25	116	9
29	Glasinac	Sokolac	2	68	25	10	33	71	103	−32	85	14
30	**Sloga**	Doboj	2	66	23	10	33	77	105	−28	79	7
31	Drina	Zvornik	3	90	20	12	58	68	159	−91	72	13
32	Brotnjo	Čitluk	2	68	19	14	35	76	114	−38	71	13
33	**Igman**	Konjic	2	66	18	16	32	82	115	−33	70	8
34	Kozara	Gradiška	2	68	19	13	36	74	107	−33	70	15
35	Zvijezda 09	Ugljevik	3	88	16	19	53	78	168	−90	67	9
36	Mladost (VO)	Velika Obarska	2	60	14	17	29	42	82	−40	59	11
37	Mladost (G)	Gacko	1	38	11	6	21	40	65	−25	39	18
38	Metalleghe	Jajce	1	32	7	11	14	25	34	−9	32	11
39	Bosna	Visoko	1	38	4	1	33	28	107	−79	13	20
40	Gradina	Srebrenik	1	30	1	6	23	17	57	−40	9	16

^{1} In the 2004–05 season, Borac were deducted 1 point (Slavija were awarded 3–0 vs Borac in week 11).
^{2} In the 2006–07 season, Zrinjski were deducted 1 point (Orašje were awarded 3–0 vs Zrinjski).
^{3} In the 2013–14 season, Slavija were deducted 3 points.
^{4} In the 2019–20 season, Čelik were deducted 3 points (Željezničar were awarded 3–0 vs Čelik).
^{5} In the 2021–22 season, Velež were deducted 3 points (Borac were awarded 3–0 vs Velež).
^{6} In the 2023–24 season, Sarajevo were deducted 3 points.

== Club records ==
=== Matches ===
==== Firsts ====
- First match: Torpedo 6–0 Bratstvo Travnik, 3 November 1946.
- First Yugoslav First League match: FK Sarajevo 2–2 Ponziana Trieste, Yugoslav First League, 25 August 1947.
- First Yugoslav Cup match: FK Sarajevo 3–1 Velež Mostar, Yugoslav Cup, 1st round, 4 November 1947.
- First unofficial European match: FK Sarajevo 5–3 Olympic Charleroi, 14 February 1950.
- First official European match: FK Sarajevo 2–4 MTK Budapest, Mitropa Cup, first round, 18 July 1960.
- First Bosnian League match: FK Sarajevo 4–0 Turbina Jablanica, first round, 22 May 1994.
- First Bosnian Cup match: FK Sarajevo 4–1 Radnički Goražde, first round, 10 April 1994.

==== Wins ====
- Record European win: 6–0 against Marsaxlokk F.C. in the UEFA Champions League, 21 July 2007.
- Record league win: 13–0 against Neretva Metkovići, 28 October 1957.
- Record Sarajevo derby win: 6–1, 10 October 1954.
- Record Cup win:
- Most league wins in a season: 19 wins from 34 games (during the 1984–85 season).
- Fewest league wins in a season: 2 wins from 18 games (during the 1947–48 season).

==== Defeats ====
- Record defeat: 0–8 loss to Atalanta in the UEFA Europa League, 2 August 2018.
- Record defeat at the Asim Ferhatović Hase Stadium: 0–8 loss to Atalanta in the UEFA Europa League, 2 August 2018.
- Record-scoring defeat: 4–6 loss to Hajduk Split, 11 February 1959
- Record Cup defeat:
- Most league defeats in a season: 17 in 34 games, during the 1989–90 season.
- Fewest defeats in a season: 5 in 34 games, during the 1984–85 season.

=== Points ===
- Most points in a season: 70 in 33 games, during the 2018–19 season.
- Two points for a win: 48 in 34 games, during the 1984–85 season.

=== Goals ===
- Most goals in a season: 83 in 30 games, during the 2003–04 season.
- Fewest goals in a season: 19 in 18 games, during the 1947–48 season.
- Top goal-scorer in a single game: Salih Šehović scored 6 goals against Neretva Metkovići (13–0 win), 28 October 1957.
- Youngest goal-scorer in an official game: Demirel Veladžić, against Slavija Sarajevo (3–1 win), 4 November 2015. He was 16 years, 5 months and 20 days old at the time.

=== Clean sheets ===
- Most consecutive clean sheets: 8, between 22 November 2025 and 21 February 2026 in official matches across the Bosnian Premier League and Bosnian Cup. This surpassed the previous record of 7 consecutive clean sheets set in 2011.
- Longest period without conceding a goal: 734 minutes, between 22 November 2025 and 21 February 2026, breaking the previous club record of 717 minutes, also set in 2011.
- Longest period without conceding a goal (Bosnian Premier League): 644 minutes, recorded during the 2025–26 season, surpassing the previous league-only mark of 608 minutes set in 2011.
- Longest period without conceding a goal (Yugoslav First League): 714 minutes set in 1974.
