= History of FK Sarajevo =

Fudbalski klub Sarajevo (Cyrillic: Фудбалски клуб Сарајево, IPA: [fûdbalskiː klûːb sɑɹəˈjeɪvəʊ]; English: Sarajevo Football Club) is a professional football club based in Sarajevo, the capital city of Bosnia and Herzegovina and is one of the most successful clubs in the country.

This article presents an overview of the club's history from its founding in 1946 to the present day, summarized in ten epochs.

== Club history ==
=== Origins and post World War II years (1946–1965) ===
A red star, Sarajevo's first ever club crest from 1946 until 1947

Less than two years after liberation of Sarajevo from Nazi Germany, FK Sarajevo was established on 24 October 1946 as the result of a merger between local Sarajevo football clubs Udarnik (Vanguard) and Sloboda (Liberty), following an earlier joint meeting between the committees of said clubs and the Sarajevo sports society. The club first appeared on the Yugoslav sports scene in 1946 under the name Fiskulturno društvo Torpedo which was an hommage to Torpedo Moscow. The first Chairman of the newly founded club was Safet Džinović, while the positions of vice-chairmen were granted to Vojo Marković and Alojz Stanarević respectively. Furthermore, Josip Bulat was named manager. On 5 October 1947, on the proposal of the then-editor-in-chief of the popular daily newspaper Oslobođenje Mirko Ostojić, the club name was changed to Fiskulturno društvo Sarajevo, before being changed yet again to Sportsko društvo metalaca Sarajevo a year later. Finally, on 20 May 1949 the name Fudbalski klub Sarajevo was adopted. The newly formed team, which inherited the results and league standings of Udarnik, which was previously ranked 7th in the Republic League standings, was joined by selected players from both Udarnik and Sloboda. Namely, Hodžić, Vlajičić, Šarenkapa, Pauković, Fizović, Konjević, Radović, Viđen and Mustagrudić from the former, and Mantula, Glavočević, Tošić, Pecelj, Novo, Strinić, Đ. Lovrić and Alajbegović from the latter. The team played its first match on 3 November 1946 against Bratstvo Travnik, winning the fixture 6–0. In September 1948 SDM Sarajevo was joined by Yugoslav footballing legend, Miroslav Brozović, who brought in a largely needed level of experience to the new team. The Mostar-native previously wore the black and white jersey of FK Partizan, as well as captaining the Yugoslavia national team. Brozović was offered the position of player-manager which he accepted, turning his attention to promoting the team to the Yugoslav First League. Even though the team concluded the second part of the season without losing a single game, fans hoped for more persuasive results and weren't overly satisfied with the five draws that were mustered. Luckily, even this was enough for a first-place finish and a promotion to the top flight after a playoff series.

Mate, I can't play for cash while listening to others telling me how to play. I'm grateful to them, they were fair and didn't make an issue out of it. I told them I can only play for Sarajevo.

— Asim Ferhatović, in an interview, after returning from a short stint with Fenerbahçe

FK Sarajevo first entered the top-flight Yugoslav First League after eliminating Sloga Novi Sad. They drew the first match 3:3 in Novi Sad but then won the second match 5:1 in Sarajevo. The team was relegated after its first season in the First League but was promoted back to the top tier in 1950. From then on FK Sarajevo played in every season of the First League apart from 1957 to 1958. In February 1950 FK Sarajevo went on a Belgian tour, with the goal of promoting Yugoslav football in the country. This was the club's first international expedition and was concluded with a 2–1 victory over the Top 11 of the Belgian First League. Previously, Sarajevo had defeated Olympic Charleroi and drawn Racing Tirimon. The next season the club finished on 6th spot in the league, and traveled on a large tour across Turkey, playing friendly ties against Galatasaray and Fenerbahçe and recording victories against both of the Turkish powerhouses. The 1951–52 season brought a 6th-place finish for the club, but also bad news for its fans. Namely, team star Lev Mantula transferred to Dinamo Zagreb in the summer transfer window, while Miroslav Brozović retired from professional football, continuing to manage the team. The club brought in future record holders Ibrahim Biogradlić and Mladen Stipić for the next season, in which the maroon-whites met their city rivals FK Željezničar in Sarajevo derby for the first time in a 1952-53 league fixture. Brozović's boys went out on top, winning 5–2, and eventually earned a 7th-place finish in the league standings. The 1955–56 season was the debut for legendary striker Asim Ferhatović, who found the back of the net on 11 occasions and finished the club's league top scorer. The next 1956–57 season a 13th-place league finish brought the club's second and last relegation to the second-tier of Yugoslav football, where they spent a one season. The season also subsequently marked the end of Miroslav Brozović's 8-year reign. The club quickly appointed Aleksandar Tomašević manager for the 1957–58, who promoted the side back to the Yugoslav First league 1958–59 season. Three more campaigns under managers László Fenyvesi, Vojin Božović, Miroslav Brozović for a second time and Ratomir Čabrić brought mediocre results with the club placing 8th, 7th and 9th, before finally earning a 4th-place finish in the 1963–64 season. The following campaign brought an even better result under legendary Yugoslav-Turkish manager Abdulah Gegić, who led the team to a runners-up league conclusion. The club's first taste of official European competitions began during the 1960s when it took part in the 1960 Mitropa Cup and the 1961–63 Balkans Cup, while the first serious European competition the club took part in was the 1962–63 Intertoto Cup. Notable FK Sarajevo players in the early years were Franjo Lovrić, Đuka Lovrić, Dobrivoje Živkov, Ibrahim Biogradlić, Zijad Arslanagić, Salih Šehović, Nerčez Novo, Mladen Stipić and Lev Mantula.

=== First championship generation (1965–1967) ===
By the mid-1960s legendary striker Asim Ferhatović, nicknamed Hase, who played for the club from 1952 to 1967, grew into his own and became the club's leading star. In the 1963–64 season, his total of 19 goals made him the top scorer in the First League, while the club finished fourth, finishing runners-up to Partizan Belgrade for the first time the following season. Sarajevo won their first Yugoslav First League title in 1966–67, becoming the first national champions from Bosnia and Herzegovina. Sarajevo started the historic season with Brozović at the helm of the coaching staff. The team had a dream start with back-to-back wins against FK Sutjeska Nikšić and their city rivals FK Željezničar. This was followed by a draw against the European Cup runners-up, FK Partizan, in which Sarajevo squandered an early lead. With seven points from their first three fixtures, Sarajevo was still not considered a title favorite, but that was to change after Brozović's boys returned from the Dalmatian coast with a win against Hajduk Split. Four days later Sarajevo beat NK Olimpija 2:1 at a sold-out Koševo stadium. Hard-earned wins against HNK Rijeka and Red Star Belgrade followed, and by the winter break, Sarajevo had won 14 out of their first 20 league fixtures, finishing the year at pole position. The team opened the second part of the season away to Dinamo Zagreb in the last sixteen of the Yugoslav Cup winning 1:0 courtesy of a Boško Antić stunner. In the quarterfinals Sarajevo got the better of FK Napredak, but eventually lost in the Cup final to Hajduk Split, played at the Stari plac stadium on May 24. The team was quickly back to winning ways, defeating Red Star Belgrade at the Marakana 3:1 with two goals by Antić and one by Prodanović. A week later OFK Belgrade were defeated by the same margin, but a shock defeat to FK Vojvodina in Novi Sad brought Dinamo Zagreb on level points with three games to go. FK Vardar was defeated next thanks to a Musemić brace, while Dinamo dropped points in Rijeka. In the last league fixture of the season Sarajevo hosted NK Čelik in front of 30,000 spectators and went on to win 5:2, bringing home the club's first league title. The league triumph qualified Sarajevo to the 1967–68 European Cup, where they played their first tie against Cypriots Olympiakos Nicosia, winning 5:3 on aggregate. In the second round (one round short of the quarter-finals), Sarajevo was knocked out 2:1 on aggregate by eventual champions Manchester United of England, despite hosting a goalless draw in the first leg. The first leg was played before an audience of 40,000 spectators and refereed by the Italian Francesco Francescon. The second leg played at Old Trafford ended in controversy after the ball went out of bounds prior to the hosts scoring their second goal. Notable Sarajevo players during this era included Boško Antić, Mirsad Fazlagić, Vahidin Musemić, Fahrudin Prljača and Boško Prodanović.

=== Period of stagnation (1967–1979) ===
Shortly after winning its first Yugoslav league title FK Sarajevo endured a period of general stagnation. The team entered the 1967/68 season as strong title favorites, but the campaign turned out to be a complete disaster. Namely, the maroon-whites, managed by former player Franjo Lovrić, did not manage to enter the championship race in hopes of defending the title, finishing mere 7th. The club management quickly named Munib Saračević manager for the 1968–69 season, but this move also turned out to be fruitless even though the team went on a six-game winning streak after Saračević's initial appointment. Sarajevo went on another large-scale international tour during the winter break, playing friendly fixtures in Malta, Pakistan, Iraq, and Kuwait, before hosting the Brazilian champions Palmeiras in Sarajevo and securing a 4–1 victory. Results from the international scene did not transfer onto the domestic league, with the team concluding the disappointing campaign 11th in the league standings. The next season brought the appointment of Srboljub Markušević as manager, who would in subsequent decades become to be colloquially known as the firefighter, due to the fact that he would be brought in to rescue team results on many occasion. In the 1971 January transfer window six members of the championship-winning generation, including Boško Prodanović, Anđelko Tešan, and Fahrudin Prljača, left the club while three more followed in July of the same year, including star player Boško Antić. Sarajevo concluded the year touring Latin America with Red Star Belgrade, playing friendly fixtures in Colombia, Honduras, and Costa Rica. The next season brought hope with the team going into the winter break clinching first spot, but only managing to finish 7th at the end of the season. New players in the Sarajevo dressing room during the aforementioned campaign included the likes of Denijel Pirić who was brought in from Dinamo Zagreb and Džemil Cerić, acquired from Sloboda Tuzla. The 1973–74 season brought in a handful of new players, including the likes of future club legend Želimir Vidović and former Red Star Belgrade and Bayern Munich striker Dušan Jovanović. Furthermore, that same year 18-year-old Safet Sušić joined the club from Krivaja Zavidovići, and would go on to be one of the main catalysts for the club's second major spell at the top of Yugoslav football in the coming years. All FK Sarajevo was able to muster in the first eleven seasons after taking home the title in 1967 was one 6th place league finish, two 7th place league finishes and a 1/4 final finish in the Yugoslav Cup in 1976–77. In that same year the club barely retained its place in the top-tier with a two-point advantage over relegated Napredak Kruševac. The 1978–79 season though, brought a breath of fresh air for Sarajevo fans, with the team finishing 4th behind Hajduk Split, Dinamo Zagreb and Red Star Belgrade, and in doing so signaled things to come. Notable FK Sarajevo players in this period included Želimir Vidović, Radomir Savić, Edhem Šljivo, Srebrenko Repčić, Fuad Muzurović, Dragoljub Simić and Džemil Cerić.

=== Second championship generation (1980–1985) ===
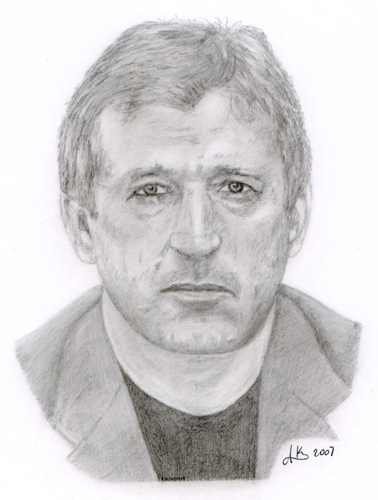
Former Sarajevo attacking midfielder and Bosnia and Herzegovina's UEFA Golden Jubilee inductee Safet Sušić

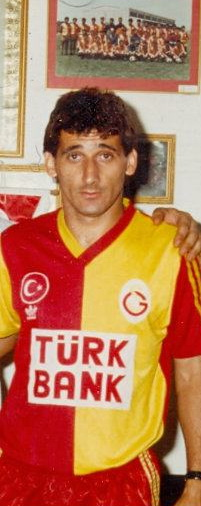
Former club winger Zijad Švrakić signing for Galatasaray

FK Sarajevo had a second successful spell between 1978 and 1985, led by the attacking duo Predrag Pašić – Safet Sušić, which established itself among the most prolific tandems in Yugoslav and Bosnian football history. Predrag Pašić nicknamed "Paja" was a winger or striker and had emerged through the club's youth ranks, eventually going on to play for Sarajevo up until his move to VfB Stuttgart after the title winning season in 1985. On the other hand, Sušić nicknamed "Pape" played the positions of playmaker and attacking midfielder, and wore the maroon-white jersey from 1973 to 1982, when he moved to Paris Saint-Germain F.C. In 1978–79, Sušić scored 15 goals and was named Player of the Season as Sarajevo finished fourth. The following year, Sušić's 17 goals helped retain his Player of the Year title, but he was also joint top scorer in the league. The club came runner-up that season, seven points behind Red Star Belgrade, therefore qualifying for the 1980–81 UEFA Cup. Sarajevo was knocked out in the first round by German powerhouse Hamburger SV, that won 7:5 on aggregate. Sarajevo returned to the UEFA Cup in 1982–83 (having finished fourth during the 1981–82 Yugoslav First League), beating Bulgaria's Slavia Sofia 6:4 in the first round and Romanian club FC Corvinul Hunedoara 8:4 in the second, thanks to a 4:0 home win in the second leg. In the third round (last 16), Sarajevo lost their first leg 6:1 to Belgian club RSC Anderlecht, and despite winning the second leg 1:0, were eliminated by the eventual champions. Sarajevo also reached the Yugoslav Cup final that season, losing 3:2 to Dinamo Zagreb in Belgrade. Sarajevo won their second championship title in 1984–85, finishing four points ahead of runners-up Hajduk Split. The new championship season didn't start in spectacular fashion for Sarajevo. A home win against Sutjeska Nikšić was followed by defeats to HNK Rijeka and Macedonian third division side FK Pelister in the Yugoslav Cup. Exiting the Cup in such shocking fashion garnered a positive reaction in the team which manifested in a 3:0 win against a tough Dinamo Vinkovci side. Furthermore, two draws against Sloboda and Željezničar were followed by a win away at Dinamo Zagreb, which pushed the Croatian side to last place in the league standings. Another Croatian side, Hajduk Split, was defeated seven days later at the Koševo stadium courtesy of a late Faruk Hadžibegić winner. Sarajevo then travelled to Belgrade where they were hosted by FK Partizan at the JNA stadium, but were defeated 1:0. A goalless draw against Budućnost followed, after which an amazing seven-game winning streak began with a victory in Kosovo against FK Priština, followed by a victory over NK Osijek on 4 November.

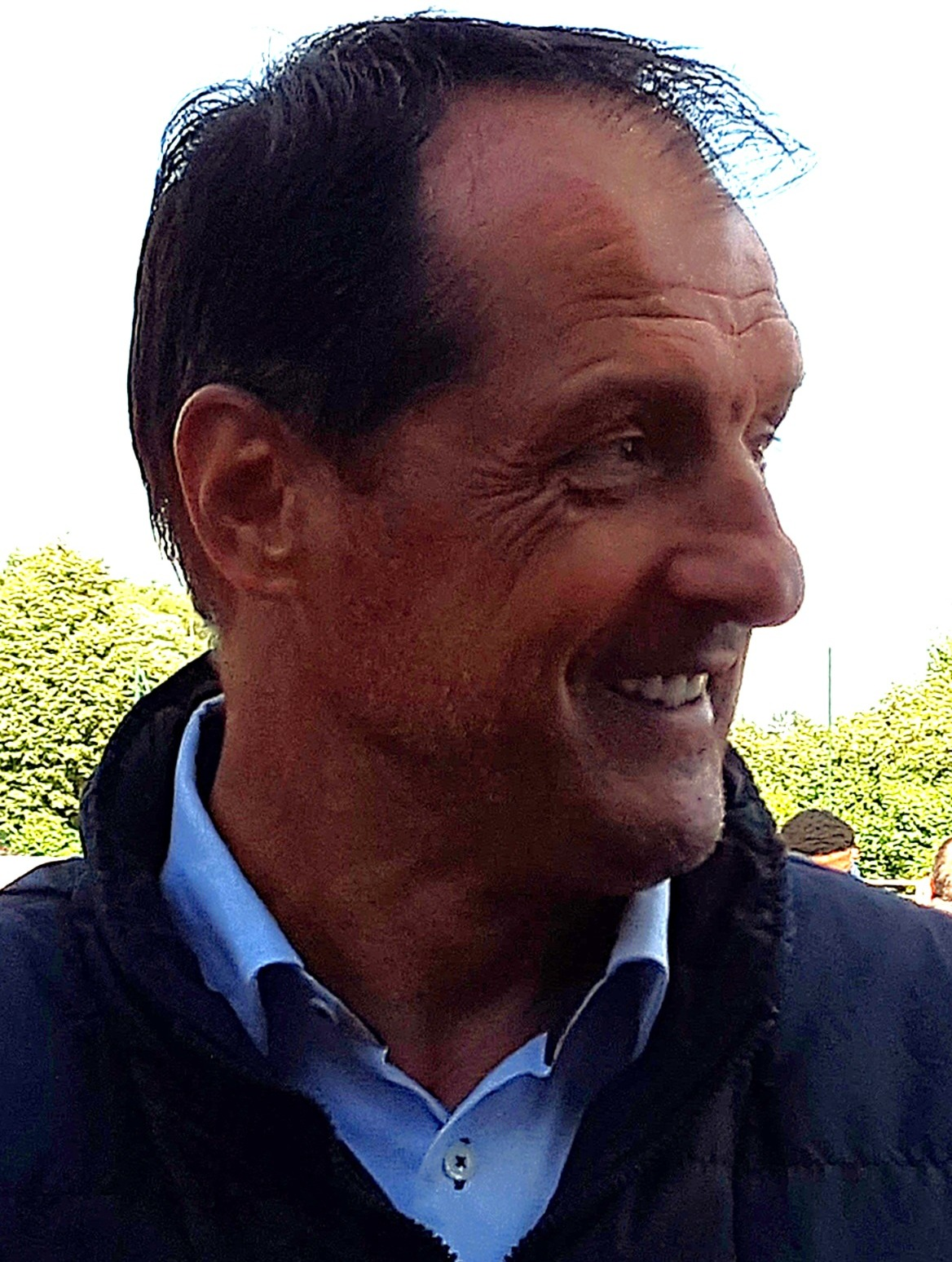
Former captain and Real Betis defender Faruk Hadžibegić

The aforementioned win brought Sarajevo into pole position in the league standings, which it did not drop until the end of the season. A wonderful win over Radnički Niš at the Čair Stadium courtesy of Musemić and Merdanović braces, and two 1:0 victories over Vojvodina and Velež further enhanced Sarajevo's appetites. Husref Musemić, the architect of the maroon-white's charge to the top of the league table, continued showing off his goalscoring abilities, and along with Dragan Jakovljević and Edin Hadžialagić helped Sarajevo defeat Iskra Bugojno 3:1. A victory over FK Vardar in the last league fixture before the winter break kept Sarajevo on the number one spot through the holidays. Boško Antić's boys didn't start the second part of the season in a positive note, winning only two points out of their first three fixtures. Luckily for them, their main rival Hajduk Split also started the second part of the season on the wrong foot, winning just one out of their first three matches, which kept Sarajevo above by one point. Antić's team went on to beat Sloboda and draw Dinamo Zagreb and Željezničar, before travelling to Split for the crucial game against Hajduk. A packed Poljud stadium witnessed a 0:0 draw that ensured Sarajevo's one point advantage over the Croatian side. Hajduk went on to drop points away to Velež, while Sarajevo defeated FK Partizan at home with goals by Musemić, Pašić and Janjoš. The team then travelled to Titograd where they drew a goalless match against Budućnost, while Hajduk defeated Iskra Bugojno, cutting the deficit to one point. Team captain Predrag Pašić and tallyman Husref Musemić combined by scoring in the next two, crucial matches against Priština and Osijek, and in doing so ensured a win and draw. Musemić again snatched a brace in the following fixture against Radnički, while Merdanović and Hadžibegić added a goal a piece for a comfortable 4:2 win. The next round saw Hajduk host Rijeka, while Sarajevo travelled to the Karađorđe Stadium in Novi Sad to play Vojvodina. Hajduk secured a comfortable route over the visitors, while Sarajevo had a much more difficult time in Novi Sad. Namely, the hosts broke the deadlock after just two minutes of play. Luckily for the huge number of travelling fans, Boško Antić's men were able to equalize ten minutes from the break through a Jakovljević effort, and to eventually snatch the win seven minutes from time courtesy of a phenomenal volley from the edge of the box by Slaviša Vukićević. The maroon-whites now needed five points from their three last fixtures to clinch the title. A routine 3:0 victory over Iskra was followed by a tough match against Vardar in Skopje that ended in a 2:2 draw, after the hosts went up 2:0 just before half time. It all came down to the final league game against Red Star Belgrade, played at a sold out Koševo stadium, where the maroon-whites need just a point to mathematically clinch the title. Musemić broke the deadlock in the 23. minute and Jakovljević doubled Sarajevo's lead with fifteen minutes to go. The visitors were able to pull one back through Boško Gjurovski in the 85th. minute, but it was too little too late. The celebrations began, Sarajevo had won its second Yugoslav league title. The triumph qualified the club for the first round of the 1985–86 European Cup, where they shockingly lost both legs to Finnish side FC Lahti. This result is still considered Sarajevo's worst in major European competitions.

The championship winning generation included the likes of Husref Musemić, Faruk Hadžibegić, Davor Jozić, Dragan Jakovljević, Miloš Đurković, Predrag Pašić, Mirza Kapetanović, Slaviša Vukićević, Zijad Švrakić, Senad Merdanović and Mehmed Janjoš.

=== Pre-Bosnian war years (1985–1992) ===
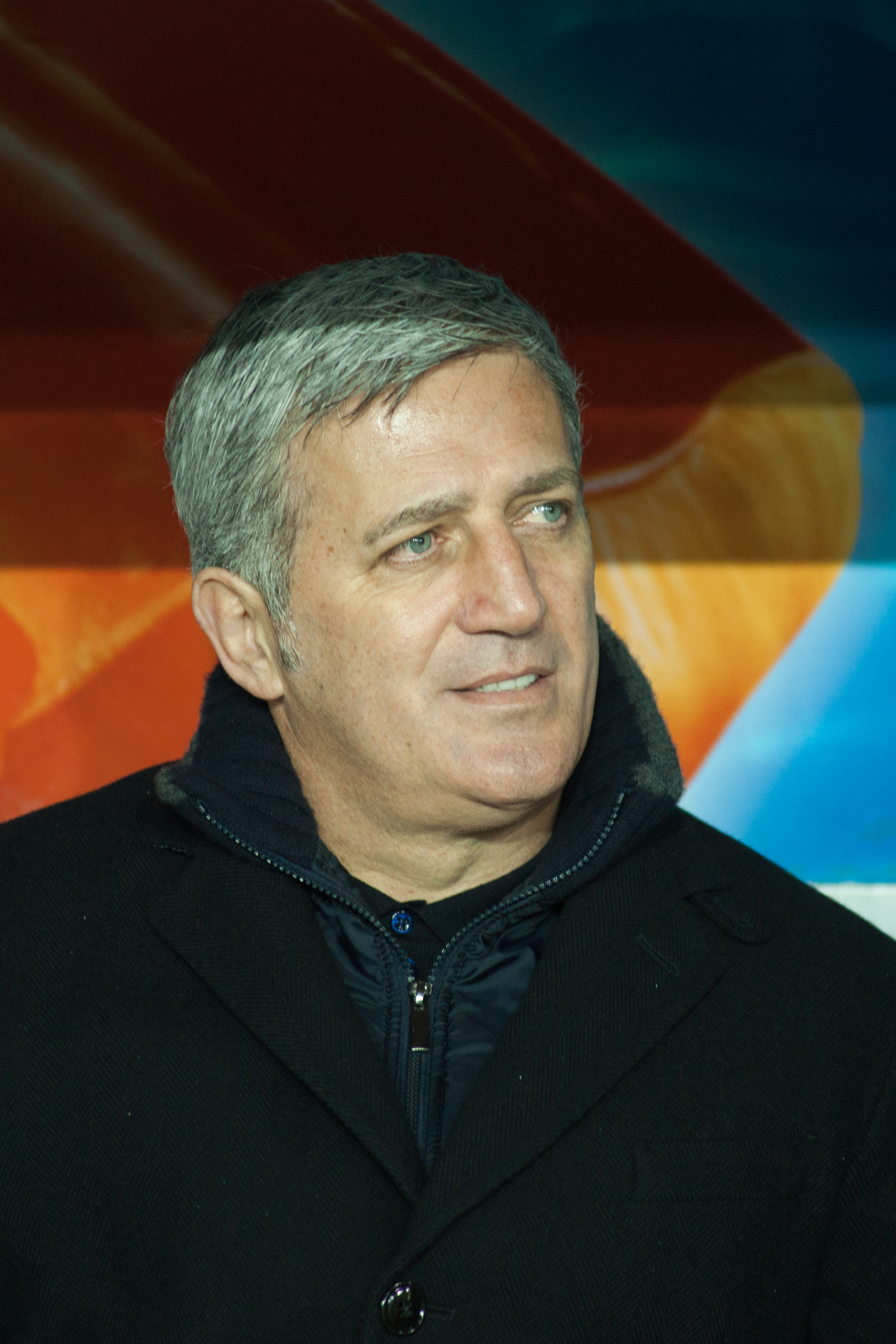
Former Sarajevo midfielder and Switzerland manager Vladimir Petković

FK Sarajevo entered a turbulent period after clinching its second Yugoslav league title. Three major members of the championship winning squad left the team in the summer of 1985. Namely, star striker Husref Musemić joined Red Star Belgrade, Faruk Hadžibegić made a move to Spanish side Real Betis, while team captain Predrag Pašić moved to the Bundesliga and joined VfB Stuttgart. The club management, in search of replacements, turned its sights to young players from lower-trier sides, bringing in Bernard Barnjak, Vladimir Petković and Zoran Ljubičić. Even though the team started the season on a high note, it finished a disappointing 15th at the end of the 1985/86 season, avoiding relegation by virtue of a superior goal-difference compared to relegated OFK Beograd. The following season again culminated in a lowly finish, as new manager Denijel Pirić lead the team to a disappointing 13th place in the league standings. Further departures followed at the end of the season as Miloš Đurković joined Beşiktaş, Muhidin Teskeredžić made the move to Sturm Graz, Davor Jozić joined Serie A side A.C. Cesena, Zijad Švrakić transferred to Adana Demirspor and Branko Bošnjak joined NK Olimpija. The following two seasons again brought mediocre league finishes as the maroon-whites concluded the respective campaigns on 13th and 14th spots, barely avoiding relegation on both occasions. As with previous seasons, a handful of players left the club during the summer transfer window, with Slaviša Vukićević moving to Créteil, goalkeeper Enver Lugušić joining Konyaspor and Dragan Jakovljević moving to FC Nantes. On a positive note, the 1989/90 season brought the return of fan favorite Husref Musemić, who had spent the previous season playing for Scottish side Hearts. His nine goals in 26 appearances did little to improve league results, as the team again concluded the campaign on 13th spot, along with an early exit in the Yugoslav Cup after a defeat to Macedonian third division minnows, FK Sileks. The 1990/91 season saw Fuad Muzurović again being named manager after a ten-year absence. Furthermore, Soviet goalkeeper Aleksei Prudnikov was brought in from Velež Mostar, thus becoming the first foreign player in the history of the club. The team was able to conclude the season on 11th spot, defeating Red Star Belgrade in a crucial, hallmark game, only days after the Belgrade outfit won the European Cup. The 1991/92 season was marked by the disintegration of Yugoslavia, and was subsequently abandoned by Slovenian, Croatian and Bosnian sides. The club played its last game in the Yugoslav First League on 5 April 1992, just a day before the start of the Siege of Sarajevo, away to Red Star Belgrade (2–5). Football was abruptly halted in Bosnia and Herzegovina for the duration of the war that would last for four years.

Notable FK Sarajevo players in the pre-war period were Miloš Nedić, Dragan Jakovljević, Dragan and Boban Božović, Dane Kuprešanin, Ismet Mulavdić, Vladimir Petković, Bernard Barnjak, and Dejan Raičković.

=== Sarajevo as a touring club (1992–1994) ===
The Bosnian War in the early 1990s shut down competitive football in the territory, and as a result FK Sarajevo became a touring club in 1993, under manager Fuad Muzurović, featuring players such as Elvir Baljić, Almir Turković, Senad Repuh and Mirza Varešanović, including Boris Živković, all future national team players for Bosnia and Herzegovina. The club had previously played a friendly against the UN peacekeeping force in the summer of 1992 at the Skenderija Sports Arena, which represented a precursor to future tours. Many of the club's supporters, including the infamous Horde Zla joined the Army of the Republic of Bosnia and Herzegovina and fought in the war. Between 22 February and 1 March 1993 the team, club officials and management staff, under heavy sniper fire, managed to escape the besieged city via the Sarajevo International Airport runway, reaching the Croatian city of Split, where the side played friendly ties against Hajduk and Dinamo Zagreb. The club's next stop was in Slovenia, where humanitarian matches against Olimpija, Maribor, Gorica and Mura were organized, as a way to collect humanitarian aid for Bosnia, but were subsequently called off. With the help of former Yugoslav international goalkeeper Fahrudin Omerović, the club travelled to Turkey where it played a humanitarian match against Kocaelispor, before embarking on a larger tour of Turkey. Further ties were played against Bursaspor, Sakaryaspor and a Top 11 Süper Lig team. An invitation to Saudi Arabia via humanitarian agencies based in Switzerland followed, with the club delegation and team reaching Jedda on 7 May 1993 and playing four humanitarian matches against local sides. A much larger Gulf of Arabia tour was then organized, with stops in Kuwait, Qatar, Oman and the UAE. In September 1993 FK Sarajevo toured Brunei and Malaysia, before visiting Teheran and playing a humanitarian match against the Iranian national team which it convincingly won 3–1. In November 1994 the club was invited to Italy by various Italian aid organizations, where it met Parma in a humanitarian match, losing 2–1 to the Serie A side. Four days later the side played Chievo on the Stadio Marc'Antonio Bentegodi, narrowly losing 2–1. While in Italy the club delegation was invited to a private reception with Pope John Paul II in the Vatican, who promised to visit Sarajevo, which he did in 1997. A tour of Germany followed, with the team playing humanitarian fixtures against Kaiserslautern, Kickers Offenbach, Eintracht Frankfurt and Werder Bremen. After reentering the besieged city, the team defeated a local UN peacekeeping force 4–1, in a hallmark game which was the first played at the Asim Ferhatović Hase Stadium in over two years. The team's exit of the country and subsequent world tour during the siege has become something of a folk tale in Bosnia and Hezegovina.

=== Post-Yugoslavia (1994–2000) ===
In 1994–95, the first-ever Bosnia and Herzegovina championship was held. Sarajevo came first in their six-team league in Jablanica, and came runners-up in the final league stage in Zenica, behind local club NK Čelik. The team went into the season with only six players on the books, seeing that many players transferred abroad during the siege. The 1995–96 season was one to forget for all Sarajevo fans, with the side concluding the respective campaign on 7th position with 43 points. Luckily, next year's campaign was more fruitful. Namely, Sarajevo again finished as runners-up to Čelik in 1996–97 (by two points), but beat the Zenica-based club in the Cup final and Super Cup. The Cup was retained the following year, and despite finishing third in the league, Sarajevo finished runners-up after the play-off series. This championship play-off second leg will be remembered as the first such tie between the maroon-whites and city rivals Željezničar, with the Blues going on to win 1:0 courtesy of a late Hadis Zubanović goal. In 1998–99, Sarajevo came first in the league before winning the play-off series against NK Bosna and being crowned national champions. The team lost 1–0 to the same opponent in the Cup final, missing out on a memorable double. Notable members of the third championship generation were Emir Granov, Muhidin Zukić, Memnun Suljagić, Alen Škoro, Džemo Smječanin and goalkeeper Mirsad Dedić. The 1999–2000 season brought a quarter-final exit in the domestic Cup, with a third-place finish in the league after being topped by NK Brotnjo on a better goal difference.

=== Formation of the joint league (2000–2013) ===
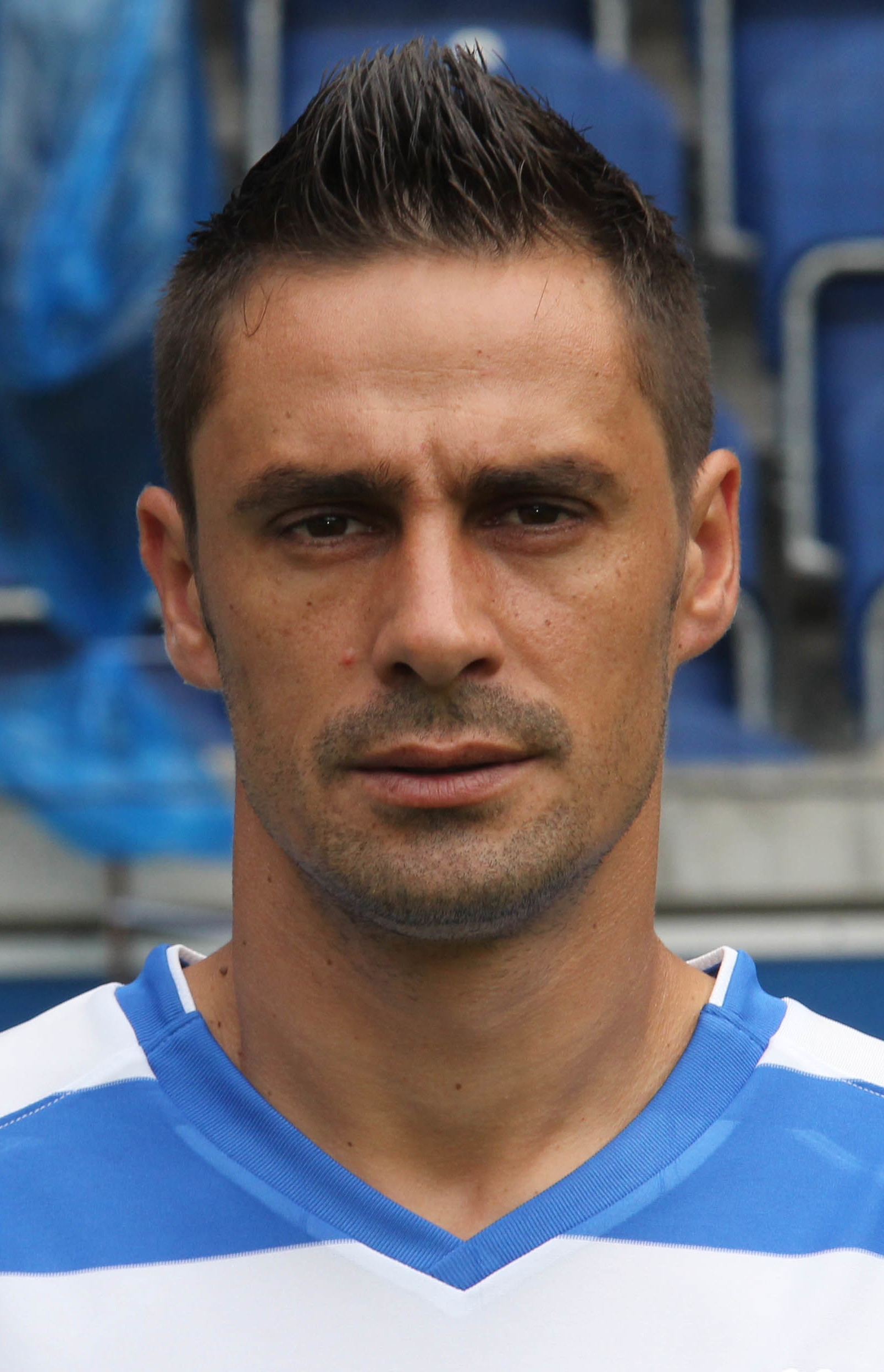
Džemal Berberović earned 201 caps for the club

The 2000–01 top-tier competition was renamed the Premier League of Bosnia and Herzegovina. It was only contested by Bosniak and Croatian clubs, but was subsequently joined by Serbian clubs from Republika Srpska a year later. In 2004, Safet Sušić, who played at FK Sarajevo from 1973 to 1982, was voted Bosnia and Herzegovina's best player of the last 50 years at the UEFA Jubilee Awards. The 2000–2001 season bought another third-place league finish, with the side being edged by NK Brotnjo and Željezničar that was crowned champion. Next year's campaign brought a memorable 2–2 draw away to Beşiktaş in the UEFA Cup, followed by a disappointing 0–5 loss to the Turkish side that still stands as the club's worst home result. After exiting the European scene the maroon whites concluded the season on 3rd place with a 16-point deficit compared to first placed Leotar. The 2003–04 campaign again saw Sarajevo finish 3rd, with Široki Brijeg being crowned with the title. Sarajevo were runners-up in the Bosnia and Herzegovina Premier League in 2005–06, but won their second title the following season, beating Zrinjski Mostar by three points in a memorable year that saw the club celebrate its 60th birthday in style. The final match of the season against Radnik saw 25,000 fans fill the Asim H. Ferhatović stadium and witness a 5–0 rout that brought the title back to Sarajevo. Memorable members of the fourth championship generation were Muhamed Alaim, Veldin Muharemović, Marinko Mačkić, Muhidin Zukić, Vule Trivunović, Ajdin Maksumić, Samir Duro, Senad Repuh, Marciano, Faruk Ihtijarević, Emir Obuća and Almir Turković. The following season was a complete disaster for the club and for its fans alike, which led to the sacking of the manager Husref Musemić. Namely, coming into the campaign as strong favorites to retain the title, the team finished on 5th spot, missing out on European competitions in the process. The 2008–09 was another disappointing season with the team, led by former player Mehmed Janjoš, concluding the respective competition in 4th spot with 49 points. The club has been a regular in Europa League qualification in the 21st century but is yet to make the group stages. Off the back of their 2006–07 league title, Sarajevo played in the UEFA Champions League for the first time in its current format. They beat Maltese champions Marsaxlokk F.C. 6:0 away in their first game, eventually winning 9:1 on aggregate. The second round saw Sarajevo defeat Belgians KRC Genk on away goals due to a 2:1 away win in the first leg, although the club was knocked out in the play-offs for the competition's Group Stage by Ukrainian champions Dynamo Kyiv who won 4:0 on aggregate. The club made the play-offs round of the 2009–10 UEFA Europa League and faced CFR Cluj but lost 3–2 on aggregate. Team defeated Spartak Trnava and Helsingborg to get to the play-offs round.

=== Vincent Tan era (2013–2019) ===
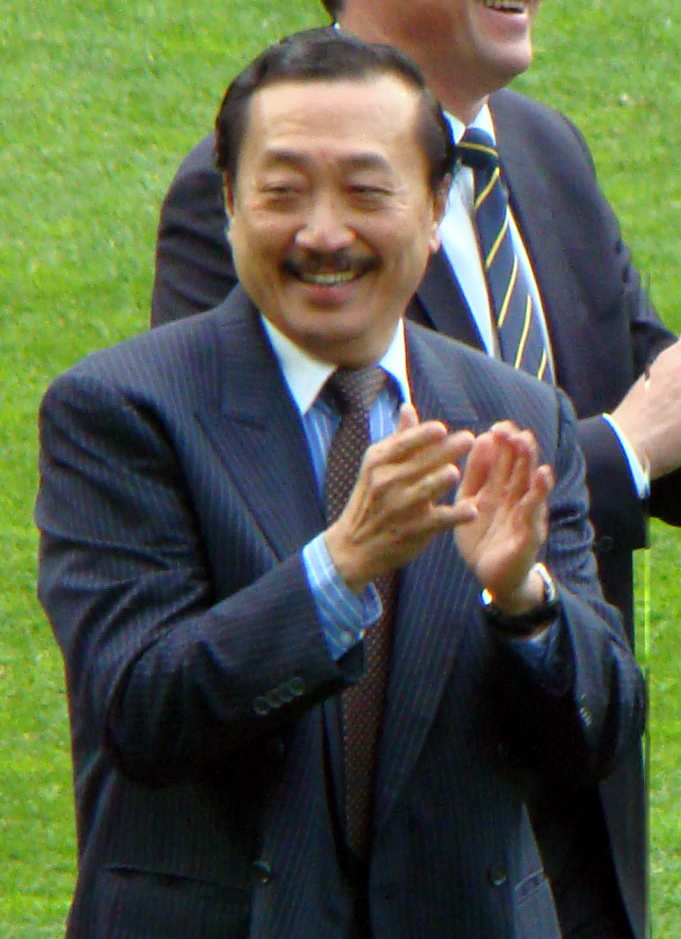
Vincent Tan was worth an estimated US$1.6 billion in 2014

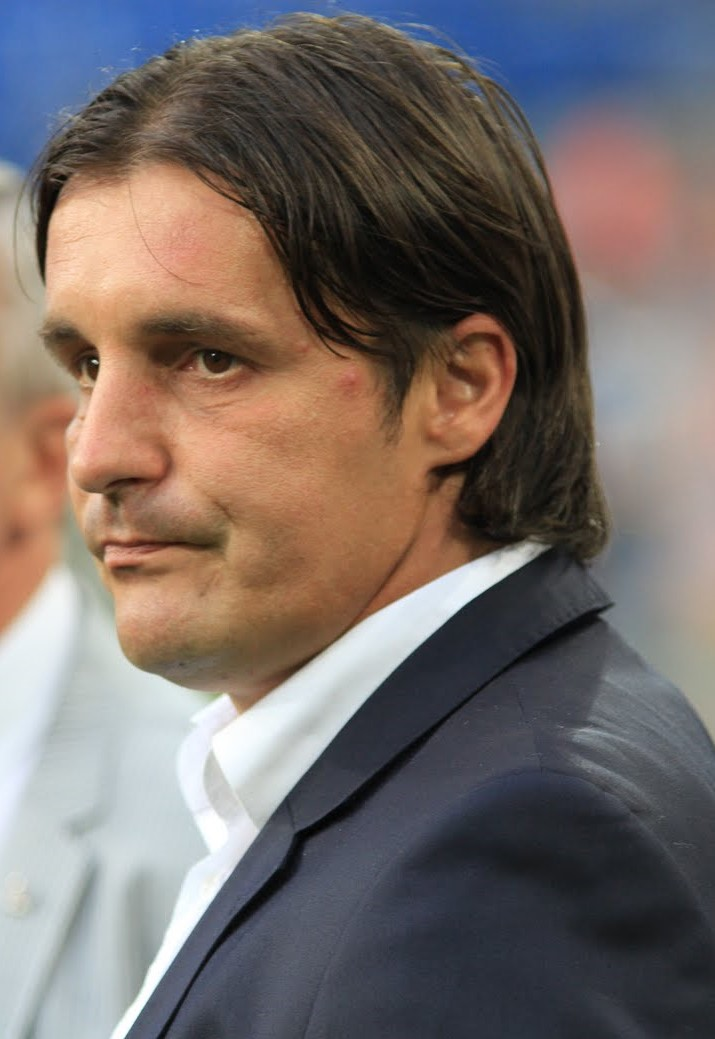
Dženan Uščuplić won the league and cup with the club

Vincent Tan, a Malaysian businessman and the owner of the Championship club Cardiff City, bought FK Sarajevo in late 2013 pledging to invest $2 million into the club. Under the deal, Cardiff will cooperate with FK Sarajevo, exchanging players and taking part in a football academy, yet to be established, which Tan has said would lure new talents. Under Mr Tan's management, the club brought in quality players with the likes of Miloš Stojčev, Džemal Berberović, and Nemanja Bilbija who helped the club win the 2013–14 Bosnian Cup, their first silverware since winning the Premier League in 2006–07. Prior to the Cup triumph, Robert Jarni was brought in as the new manager of the club in December 2013 by Tan, but was quickly dismissed only 4 months into his tenure (on 7 April 2014, while the team was still in the semi-finals of the Bosnian Cup) due to the team failing to keep its chances of winning the domestic league title alive during later stages of the 2013–14 season. FK Sarajevo played a friendly match against Tan's Cardiff City FC U21 winning 4–1.Report In 2014–15 UEFA Europa League, FK Sarajevo eliminated FK Haugesund and Atromitos to qualify for the play-off round, where it lost to German side Borussia Mönchengladbach. On 17 July 2014, Mr Tan presented pledges of assistance of €255,000 each to two hospitals in Doboj and Maglaj during the halftime break of the Europa League qualifying match between FK Sarajevo and Norwegian club FK Haugesund at the Olympic Stadium in Sarajevo. The money raised would be used to purchase and donate much-needed medical equipment for the two hospitals. In June 2014, Mr Vincent Tan made personal donation of €114,000, while people of Malaysia raised a total of €169,000 toward Bosnia's flood relief fund. In May 2014, the heaviest rains and floods in 120 years hit Bosnia and the surrounding region. The worst affected areas were the towns of Doboj and Maglaj, which were cut off from the rest of the country when floods deluged all major roads. Damage from landslides and floods was estimated to run into hundreds of millions of euros and twenty-four people lost their lives. The cost of the disaster, an official said, could exceed that of the Bosnian War. On 5 August 2014 FK Sarajevo signed a cooperation agreement with third-tier Bosnian club NK Bosna, by which Sarajevo will loan its talented youngsters to the Visoko-based side and will have first-buy rights on all NK Bosna players. The agreement was signed by Adis Hajlovac and Mirza Laletović on behalf of Bosna, and Abdulah Ibraković on behalf of Sarajevo. The agreement de facto names Bosna FK Sarajevo's farm team. 26 September 2014 manager Dženan Uščuplić was relieved of his duties as first team manager and was transferred back to the youth academy. On 30 September 2014 former Barcelona, Real Sociedad and Bosnia and Herzegovina international striker Meho Kodro was appointed manager. FK Sarajevo signed a three-and-a-half-year general sponsorship agreement with Turkish Airlines which has been labeled the most lucrative in Bosnian professional sports history. On 21 April, after poor league results, the club sacked Kodro and once again named Dženan Uščuplić manager until the end of the season. On 30 May the team defeated Sloboda Tuzla in the season's last fixture, thus winning the league title after an eight-year drought. The next season was a turbulent one for the club. After Uščuplić left his post, former Partizan and CSKA Sofia manager Miodrag Ješić took over the helm, only to be sacked after a string of disappointing results, with Almir Hurtić leading the side to a disappointing 4th-place finish in the league. On 29 August 2016, after another string of bad results at the start of the 2016–17 season, Hurtić was sacked and Mehmed Janjoš was named manager.

=== Change of ownership (since 2019) ===
Tan sold FK Sarajevo to a Vietnamese businessman Nguyễn Hoài Nam as he wanted to focus on Cardiff primarily.

The club has won back to back Premier League titles in Bosnia; 2018–19 under manager Husref Musemić and 2019–20 under Vinko Marinović. The club has also taken out the 2018–19 Bosnian Cup. The 2019–20 Premier League season ended abruptly on 1 June 2020 due to the ongoing COVID-19 pandemic in Bosnia and Herzegovina. As result FK Sarajevo entered 2020–21 UEFA Champions League First qualifying round where they faced Connah's Quay Nomads at the Cardiff City Stadium. Sarajevo won 2–0 thanks to a brace from Benjamin Tatar.
