= Lovrić =

Lovrić is a Croatian and Serbian surname.

Notable people with the surname include:

- Boris Lovrić (born 1975), Croatian bobsledder
- Darko Lovrić (born 1980), Serbian football player
- Dragan Lovrić (born 1996), Croatian footballer
- Drago Lovrić (born 1961), Croatian general
- Đuka Lovrić (1927–1957), Yugoslav footballer
- Elis Lovrić, Croatian singer-songwriter and actress
- Francesco Lovrić (born 1995), Austrian footballer
- Franjo Lovrić (1923–1982), Bosnian and Yugoslav footballer and manager
- Igor Lovrić (born 1987), Croatian soccer player (goalkeeper)
- Ivan Lovrić (ca. 1756–77), also known as Giovanni Lovrich, Croatian writer and ethnographer
- Ivan Lovrić (footballer) (born 1985), Croatian football player
- Ivana Lovrić (born 1984), Croatian handball player
- Josip Lovrić (born 1968), Bosnian-Herzegovinian basketball player
- Karmen Sunčana Lovrić (born 1986), Croatian actress
- Kristijan Lovrić (born 1995), Croatian professional footballer
- Ljubomir Lovrić (1920–1994), Serbian football player and manager
- Nataša Lovrić (born 2000), Serbian handball player
- Sandi Lovrić (born 1998), Slovenian footballer

== See also ==
- Lovrich (disambiguation)
- Pia Lovrič
