= Dragoljub Simić =

Personal information
- Full name: Dragoljub Simić
- Date of birth: 14 August 1951 (age 75)
- Place of birth: Gračanica, FPR Yugoslavia
- Position: Midfielder

Senior career*
Years	Team	Apps	(Gls)
1968–1979	FK Sarajevo	245	(36)
1979–1980	Burgos	21	(3)
1980–1982	Los Angeles Aztecs	158	(42)
1982–1985	New York Arrows (indoor)	34	(4)
Total		458	(85)

International career
1970–1972	Yugoslavia U21	6	(0)
- * Club domestic league appearances and goals

Dragoljub "Dragan" Simić (Serbian Cyrillic: Драгољуб Симић; born 14 August 1951) is a former Yugoslav and Bosnian footballer who spent the majority of his playing career with FK Sarajevo.

== Club career ==
He made his debut for Sarajevo's first team in May 1969 in Zrenjanin. He played in the halfback position, and after the 1969–70 season, made 17 appearances in all competitions. By the next season, he became irreplaceable in his position. Although he was only 19 years old, he was one of Sarajevo's best players in the 1970–71 season, making a total of 27 appearances and scoring 7 goals. Great games in Sarajevo's jersey earned him a call-up to the Yugoslavia under-21 team, for which he played six times.

He achieved his greatest success with Sarajevo in the summer of 1972 when he won the Champions Summer League. During the seventies, in tandem with Edhem Šljivo, he formed the backbone of the midfield of the team from Koševo, and in the 1976–77 season, he was named club captain. He wore the maroon jersey with the number eight on his back until the summer of 1979, when he moved to Primera division club Real Burgos CF. After a year in Spain, he left for the US, where he performed for the Los Angeles Aztecs and the New York Arrows, before retiring in 1985.

During his ten-year stay at Koševo, Simić made 245 official appearances for Sarajevo and scored 36 goals. He scored most of his goals in matches against the strongest Yugoslav teams. Two goals against Sarajevo's city rival Željezničar in a great victory of 5:0, in the fall of 1976, were especially remembered, as well as the fact that he scored six goals in matches against Red Star Belgrade, which is why only Asim Ferhatović Hase was more effective than him against the Belgrade outfit.
