= Lovrich =

Lovrich is a surname. Notable people with the surname include:

- Anthony Lovrich (born 1961), Australian rower
- Giovanni Lovrich (c. 1756–1777), Croatian writer, ethnographer, and medical student
- Pete Lovrich (1942–2018), American baseball pitcher

== See also ==
- Lovrić
