= 1993–94 in Bosnia and Herzegovina football =

The 1993–1994 season in Bosnia and Herzegovina was affected by Bosnian war.

The Bosnian Serbs team FK Borac Banja Luka played in Second League of FR Yugoslavia. Bosnian Croats held their own league and the first winner was Mladost-Dubint Široki Brijeg.
