= Nerćes Novo =

Yugoslav footballer (b. 1928, d. 1983)

Personal information
- Full name: Nerćes Novo
- Date of birth: 25 September 1928
- Place of birth: Skopje, Kingdom of Yugoslavia
- Date of death: 11 October 1983 (aged 55)
- Place of death: Sarajevo, Yugoslavia
- Position: Attacking midfielder

Senior career*
Years	Team	Apps	(Gls)
1945–1946	Sloboda Sarajevo	4	(0)
1946–1947	Sarajevo	7	(2)
1947–1951	Željezničar	31	(3)
1953–1959	Sarajevo	132	(21)
1959–1960	Igman Ilidža	8	(0)
- * Club domestic league appearances and goals

Nerćes Novo (25 September 1928 – 11 October 1983) was a former Yugoslav and Bosnian footballer that played as an attacking midfielder and occasional forward. Born in Skopje, he moved to Sarajevo as a child and went on to compete for both Sarajevo and Željezničar.

== Football career ==
Novo started his career shortly after the end of World War II with the newly formed club Sloboda Sarajevo. On 24 October 1946, the club merged with Udarnik, another local club formed by the newly established communist authorities. The merger resulted in the creation of FK Sarajevo, for whom Novo competed for one season before moving to city rivals Željezničar. After four years at the Grbavica stadium, he transferred back to Sarajevo and established himself as a first-team regular, playing in the Yugoslav First League. Novo represented the maroon-whites for nine seasons, before going on to compete for Igman Ilidža for one year before retiring from football.

== Life after football ==
Novo graduated from the Faculty of Law, University of Sarajevo in 1961 and had a lustrous career as an attorney.

== Death ==
Nerćes Novo died prematurely on 11 October 1983. He is buried at the Bare Cemetery in Sarajevo.
