= Anton Agošton =

Yugoslav-Serbian footballer (1928–1997)

Personal information
- Full name: Anton Agošton
- Date of birth: 1 May 1928
- Place of birth: Belgrade, Kingdom of Serbs, Croats, and Slovenes
- Date of death: 6 August 1997 (aged 69)
- Place of death: Belgrade, FR Yugoslavia
- Position: Defender

Senior career*
Years	Team	Apps	(Gls)
1947–1952	Red Star Belgrade	3	(0)
1952–1956	Sarajevo	102	(2)
1956–1959	Romanija Sarajevo	28	(0)
- * Club domestic league appearances and goals

Anton Agošton (Serbian Cyrillic: Антон Агоштон; 1 May 1928 – 6 August 1997) was a Yugoslav and Serbian footballer who played as a defender.
