= Zijad Arslanagić =

Bosnian footballer (1936–2020)

Personal information
- Full name: Zijad Arslanagić
- Date of birth: 18 April 1936
- Place of birth: Trebinje, Kingdom of Yugoslavia
- Date of death: 7 January 2020 (aged 83)
- Position: Forward

Youth career
- Gimnazijalac Trebinje

Senior career*
Years	Team	Apps	(Gls)
1953–1956	Leotar Trebinje		
- FK Rakovica
1958–1964	FK Sarajevo	113	(40)
1964–1967	Olimpija Ljubljana	33+	(29)
1967–1968	Beringen	22	(8)
1968–1969	Tasmania Berlin	25	(11)

International career
1965	Yugoslavia	1	(0)
- * Club domestic league appearances and goals

Zijad Arslanagić (18 April 1936 – 7 January 2020) was a Bosnian football player. He had one cap for the Yugoslavia national team.

== Club career ==
After beginning to play in a minor local club in his home town, FK Gimnazijalac, he signed with the city's most prominent club FK Leotar where he played between 1953 and 1956. In 1956 he moved because of the military service to Zemun, and afterwards, for a short while, he played with local club FK IM Rakovica. In 1958 he began playing for FK Sarajevo and played with them in the Yugoslav First League until 1964 when he moved to NK Olimpija Ljubljana. In 1967, he moved abroad and played one season with Belgian First Division club K. Beringen F.C. and in the next year he moved to Germany and played with Tasmania 1900 Berlin before retiring.

== International career ==
He played one match for the Yugoslavia national team in the 1966 FIFA World Cup qualifications on 7 November 1965 in Belgrade against Norway, a 1–1 draw.
