= Ibrahim Biogradlić =

Bosnian-Herzegovinian footballer

Personal information
- Full name: Ibrahim Biogradlić
- Date of birth: 8 March 1931
- Place of birth: Sarajevo, Kingdom of Yugoslavia
- Date of death: 20 February 2015 (aged 83)
- Place of death: Sarajevo, Bosnia and Herzegovina
- Position: Defender

Senior career*
Years	Team	Apps	(Gls)
1951–1967	FK Sarajevo	317	(31)

International career
1956	Yugoslavia	1	(0)

Managerial career
- 1986: Zadar
- 1987–1988: FK Sarajevo U-19
- 1996: Bargh Shiraz
- FK Jedinstvo Brčko
Medal record
Men's Football
Representing Yugoslavia
Olympic Games
Silver medal – second place	1956 Melbourne	Team
- * Club domestic league appearances and goals

Ibrahim "Ibro" Biogradlić (8 March 1931 – 20 February 2015) was a Yugoslav and Bosnian footballer who played at 1956 Summer Olympics for Yugoslavia, winning a silver medal.

== Club career ==
He started his football career first in Udarnik, and then continued in Torpedo. Even as a youth, he got the opportunity to debut in the jersey of the first team of Sarajevo. Biogradlić made his unofficial debut on 13 June 1948 in a match against city rivals Željeznicar played as part of the "Children's Sunday" tournament. He had to wait two more years for his first official appearance, and in the meantime, in the summer of 1950, he won the title of youth champion of Bosnia and Herzegovina with the junior team of Sarajevo.

He made his first official appearance in the Sarajevo jersey on 30 November 1950, in a cup match with Rabotnik in Skenderija. Sarajevo celebrated an 11:0 win, and young Biogradlić left a good impression. In the seasons to come, he became an indispensable part of the team. He played most often in the position of defender, but he was decorated with a powerful shot, so the coaches often decided to assign him to the very top of the attack, when the situation on the field demanded it. Great games in the Sarajevo jersey earned him an invitation to the national team, for which he played at the 1956 Olympic Games in Melbourne, where he won a silver medal.

He wore the jersey of Sarajevo for 18 seasons, never leaving Koševo. Even as he was nearing the end of his career, he was offered the role of technical director of the team, so in his last playing season in 1966/67, he performed two functions in parallel. He helped Miroslav Brozović in leading the team, but managed to make 15 first league appearances and thus leave his stamp on winning the first championship title. He wore the Sarajevo shirt in 379 official matches, scoring 41 goals. Including friendly matches, Biogradlić made 646 appearances and scored 86 goals, and is the club's record holder with the most appearances.

== International career ==
He made his debut for Yugoslavia in a December 1956. He played at the 1956 Olympic Games in Melbourne, where he won a silver medal.

== Death ==
Biogradlić died on 20 February 2015 following a long illness. He was 83.
