= Mladen Stipić =

Yugoslav footballer (b. 1929, d. 2013)

Personal information
- Full name: Mladen Stipić
- Date of birth: 21 September 1929
- Place of birth: Mrkonjić Grad, Kingdom of Yugoslavia
- Date of death: 3 November 2013 (aged 84)
- Place of death: Zagreb, Croatia
- Position: Defender

Senior career*
Years	Team	Apps	(Gls)
1946–1950	Borac Banja Luka	21	(9)
1950–1951	Partizan	1	(0)
1951–1963	Sarajevo	212	(11)

Managerial career
- 1965–1989: Sarajevo (youth)
- * Club domestic league appearances and goals

Mladen Stipić (21 September 1929 - 3 November 2013) was a Yugoslav and Bosnian footballer who spent the majority of his playing career with FK Sarajevo.

== Playing career ==
Mladen Stipić started his career as a striker with Borac Banja Luka. After three seasons with Borac, the talented 21-year-old transferred to Partizan but managed only one appearance for the Belgrade outfit. In November 1951 he earned a move to Sarajevo.

With Sarajevo, he went on a New Year's tour in West Germany, but after returning to his homeland, he failed to impress coach Miroslav Brozović, and in March he decided to return to the ranks of his native Borac. In Borac, Stipić most often played as a midfielder or center forward and was the team's first scorer. At the end of 1952, the Sarajevo team was taken over by Aleksandar Tomašević, who insisted on Stipić's return to Koševo. Thus, in March 1953, Stipić finally made his official debut in the Sarajevo jersey. In his first games, he played in the center forward position and had a dream start. He was the scorer in his first two games, against Spartak Subotica at home and Velež in Mostar, thus cementing his place in the starting line-up.

At the end of the season, Tomašević left Sarajevo, and the team was taken over by newly appointed manager Slavko Zagorac, who reassigned Stipić to the right-back position, which would turn out to be a superb move. Over the next few years, Stipić grew into one of the best right-backs in Yugoslavia at that time. He played his best football in the 1954–55 season, under the bat of Meha Brozović. An experienced manager, he skillfully used Stipić in two positions in the team. He played half of the games in the position of right back, and the other half in attack. The games against Željezničar, in the first league match between the Sarajevo rivals, when he scored two goals, and Zagreb's Lokomotiva, whose net he penetrated three times in an 8:0 thumping, are particularly memorable. In the autumn of 1954, Sarajevo played, according to many, the most beautiful football in Yugoslavia, which is confirmed by the high third position at the end of the autumn half-season.

Great games in the Sarajevo jersey caught the eye of various Yugoslavia managers, so in 1954, Stipić received an invitation to the senior national team for the first time for a match against Belgium, but ending up being an unused substitute. In May of the following year, he sat on the national team's bench two more times, in matches against Scotland and Italy, but was again left without the opportunity to perform. Unlike the "A" national team, which was apparently not destined for him, he made three appearances in the "B" team jersey in the fall of 1955, against the respective selections of England, Austria and Germany.

He wore the Sarajevo jersey until 1963 when he decided to end his career. In the meantime, Mirsad Fazlagić inherited his jersey with the number two. He made a total of 212 official appearances for Sarajevo.

== Coaching career ==
After the end of his playing career, he dedicated himself to coaching and worked in the FK Sarajevo youth department for 24 years.

== Death ==
Mladen Stipić died on 3 November 2013 in Zagreb, Croatia.
