= Dobrivoje Živkov =

Yugoslav footballer

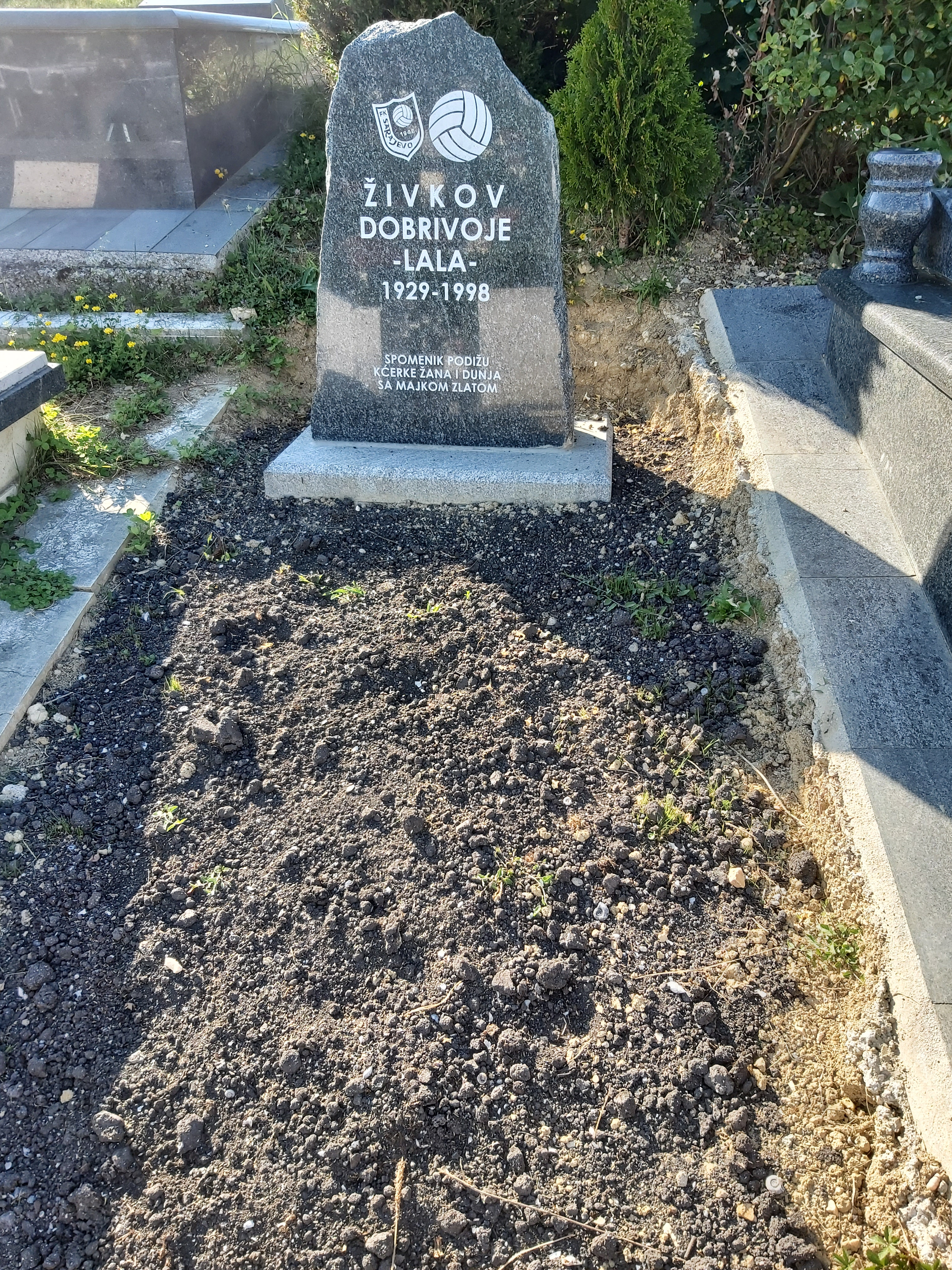
- Živkov's grave at Bare Cemetery

Personal information
- Date of birth: 4 March 1929
- Place of birth: Bečej, Kingdom of SCS
- Date of death: 26 October 1998 (aged 69)
- Place of death: Sarajevo, Bosnia and Herzegovina
- Position: Forward

Senior career*
Years	Team	Apps	(Gls)
1950–1961	FK Sarajevo	412	(212)
- * Club domestic league appearances and goals

Dobrivoje "Lala" Živkov (Serbian Cyrillic: Добривоје Живков; 4 March 1929 – 26 October 1998) was a Yugoslav professional footballer.

Živkov played the position of forward for FK Sarajevo, and is still the club's all-time top scorer in official and unofficial matches, as well as the club's third All-time goal scorer in official competitions.

== Playing career ==
At the age of 19 Živkov arrived in Sarajevo to complete his mandatory military service. After completing it, he remained in Sarajevo and joined FK Sarajevo in the fall of 1950. During the first couple of training sessions, Živkov impressed coach Miroslav Brozović, who gave him his first opportunity in the Yugoslav Cup matches, in November and December of that year.

In his debut season, Živkov established himself in the first line-up of the team from Koševo, and very quickly became a fan favorite. Because of his origin from Vojvodina, fans affectionately called him "Lala", and that nickname followed him throughout his playing career. In the mid-fifties, Živkov played his best games. Although he played on the left wing, he was the team's top goalscorer in those years. In the 1952/53 season, he scored 17 goals for Sarajevo in all competitions, and two seasons later he stopped at 14 goals. Great games in Sarajevo's jersey earned him an invitation to the "B" national team of Yugoslavia, for which he made his debut on 30 October 1955 in Zagreb, against the corresponding selection of Austria. In total, he made two appearances for the "B" team of Yugoslavia.

Together with Šehović, Živkov played a key role in the 1957/58 season during which Sarajevo, carried by the duo, strolled through the Zone League. That season, Šehović and Živkov scored a combined 56 goals together in the Zone League matches, and in the qualifying matches for Sarajevo's triumphant return to the First Federal League. After returning to the First League, problems with injuries followed, so at the end of the 1960/61 season Živkov decided to hang up his football boots and devoted himself to coaching in the youth facility of the team from Koševo.

During eleven years of active playing for Sarajevo, Živkov made 238 official appearances and scored 90 goals, which is why he is in third place on the list of the best club scorers of all time. Including unofficial matches, Živkov made 412 appearances in the Sarajevo jersey and scored 212 goals, which makes him the absolute club record holder for the number of goals, including those in friendly matches.

== Death ==
Dobrivoje Živkov died on 26 October 1998 in Sarajevo and is buried in the Bare cemetery.
