= Srebrenko Repčić =

Bosnia-Herzegovinian footballer (born 1954)

Personal information
- Date of birth: 1 December 1954 (age 71)
- Place of birth: Bosanski Šamac, FPR Yugoslavia
- Position: Attacking midfielder

Senior career*
Years	Team	Apps	(Gls)
1969–1973	Borac Šamac		
1973–1975	Sloga Doboj		
1975–1979	FK Sarajevo	132	(35)
1979–1983	Red Star Belgrade	95	(25)
1983–1985	Fenerbahçe	62	(13)
1985–1988	Standard Liège	91	(18)
1988–1989	Guingamp	33	(7)

International career
1980	Yugoslavia	1	(0)

Managerial career
- Levallois SC
- * Club domestic league appearances and goals

Srebrenko Repčić (Serbian Cyrillic: Cpeбpeнкo Peпчић; born 1 December 1954) is a football manager and former player.

He made his name while playing as an attacking midfielder for FK Sarajevo in partnership with likes of Safet Sušić, Predrag Pašić, and Radomir Savić.

== Club career ==
Repčić started playing as senior with FK Borac Šamac having only 15 years and he also played for FK Sloga Doboj before moving to FK Sarajevo. He finished off his playing days with stints with Fenerbahçe (103 matches and 31 goals) in Turkey between 1983 and 1985, Standard Liège in Belgium and France with En Avant Guingamp. He earned one cap for the Yugoslavia national team.

Alter impressing at FK Sarajevo, where he led the club's scoring charts for four seasons, Repčić, together with Radomir Savić, made a transfer to Red Star Belgrade in the summer of 1979. In his first season in Belgrade (1979–80), he scored 7 league goals in 33 appearances. He also had a memorable showing in that season's UEFA Cup round-of-16 second leg match versus Bayern Munich. Red Star was 2–0 down after the first leg in Munich, but led 3–0 in the 50th minute of the return leg at Marakana courtesy of Repčić double and another goal by "Pižon" Petrović. They could not hold on as Germans countered with two quick goals for 3–2 on the night that spelled painful exit for Red Star. Repčić moved on from Red Star Belgrade in the summer of 1983.

== International career ==
He made one senior appearance for Yugoslavia, coming on as a second-half substitute for Zlatko Vujović in a March 1980 friendly match against Uruguay.

== Managerial career ==
After he wrapped up his career as a player, Repčić tried his hand at coaching. He worked at the French club Levallois Sporting Club Football. During the 1996–97 season, he coached 18-year-old Didier Drogba.

== Personal life ==
During the late 1970s, Repčić married his girlfriend Mira who would later go on to become a paediatrician. The couple's child, son Vedran, was born in 1978.

Repčić's son became involved in criminal activity at an early age. The teenager was a defendant in two separate murder trials after being charged following the 1 October 1996 killing of 71-year-old overnight security guard Milan Budimir during a burglary-robbery in Zaplanjska Street in the Belgrade neighbourhood of Braće Jerković as well as the killing of 22-year-old taxi driver Branko Topalović two weeks later during another robbery in the same neighbourhood. Vedran Repčić ended up being acquitted on both charges due to lack of evidence. He would be charged with murder again following the 3 August 1998 killing of Predrag Milosavljević, owner-and-operator of a convenience kiosk in the Braće Jerković neighbourhood who was gunned down from an AK-47 rifle during a robbery. This time, following a court process that ended in 2003, Repčić was convicted of murder and sentenced to 10 years in prison.

After Vedran's release from prison, an attempt on his life was made in November 2015 on Dragice Končar Street in the Braće Jerković neghbourhood. He survived the shooting, but suffered irreparable damages (a fragment of one of the bullets was embedded in his skull). In November 2020, he was the victim of a second assassination attempt—this time, an unidentified assailant wearing a ball cap and surgical mask shot him to death in Belgrade's neghbourhood of Braće Jerković.

== Career statistics ==
Appearances and goals by club, season and competition
Club	Season	League		Cup		Europe		Total	
Club	Season	Apps	Goals	Apps	Goals	Apps	Goals	Apps	Goals
FK Sarajevo	1975–76	31	10	1	0	–		32	10
FK Sarajevo	1976–77	33	7	2	1	–		35	8
FK Sarajevo	1977–78	34	6	2	1	–		36	7
FK Sarajevo	1978–79	34	12	1	0	–		35	12
FK Sarajevo	Total	132	35	6	2	0	0	138	37
Red Star Belgrade	1979–80	33	7					33	7
Red Star Belgrade	1980–81	33	10					33	10
Red Star Belgrade	1981–82								
Red Star Belgrade	1982–83	29	8					29	8
Red Star Belgrade	Total	95	25					95	25
