= Radomir Savić =

Personal information
- Date of birth: 15 February 1956 (age 70)
- Place of birth: Ilijaš, FPR Yugoslavia
- Position: Forward

Youth career
- Sloga Ilijaš

Senior career*
Years	Team	Apps	(Gls)
1975–1979	FK Sarajevo	91	(31)
1979–1983	Red Star Belgrade	44	(6)
1983–1984	Spartak Subotica	16	(4)
1984–1985	Budućnost Titograd	25	(3)
1985–1991	Wolfsberger AC		
1991–1995	SAK Klagenfurt		
Total		176	(44)

Managerial career
- 1999-2001: SV Schildorn
- 2007-2008: ASKÖ Raika Ampflwang
Medal record
Representing Yugoslavia
Gold medal – first place	UEFA U-21 Euro	1978
- * Club domestic league appearances and goals

Radomir Savić (Serbian Cyrillic: Радомир Савић; born 15 February 1956) is a retired Yugoslav and Bosnian-Herzegovinian, footballer.

== Career ==
Born in Ilijaš, near Sarajevo, SR Bosnia and Herzegovina, back then within Yugoslavia, Savić started playing at the small local club FK Sloga Ilijaš, before getting picked up by the local powerhouse FK Sarajevo in the mid-1970s. Savić went on to spend four seasons with the club, appearing in 91 Yugoslav First League matches and scoring 31 goals.

During his time at Sarajevo Savić became one of the top Yugoslav strikers, and in the 1977–78 season he was the league's top scorer with 21 goals in 33 appearances. In the 1978–79 season he helped the Sarajevo finished fourth, which was the club's best result in years. Together with teammate Srebrenko Repčić, Savić moved to Yugoslav giants Red Star Belgrade in the summer of 1979.

He spent the following four and a half seasons with Red Star, but his time at the Belgrade-based side was less successful. Savić never managed to break into the first team and only scored 6 league goals in 44 appearances. In spite of lack of playing time, Savić was part of the squad which won the 1979–80 and 1980–81 league titles during his time at the club.

In the winter of 1983, he moved on to Yugoslav Second League side Spartak Subotica, with whom he spent the rest of the season, and who finished runners-up in Division West behind Iskra Bugojno, narrowly missing promotion. He then signed for Budućnost Titograd, a top-level side who spent the season struggling to avoid relegation, and helped them finish 15th in 1984–85 with 3 goals in 25 appearances.

In 1985, Savić moved abroad and joined Austrian lower-level side Wolfsberger AC, with whom he spent several years before retiring in the early 1990s and earning a coaching licence. He then became player-coach at SV Schildorn.
