= Džemil Cerić =

Personal information
- Date of birth: August 7, 1949 (age 77)
- Place of birth: Bosanski Novi, FPR Yugoslavia
- Positions: Midfielder; midfielder

Youth career
- 1960–1968: Sloboda Tuzla

Senior career*
Years	Team	Apps	(Gls)
1968–1969	Dinamo Zagreb	8	(1)
1970–1971	Sloboda Tuzla		
1971–1972	FK Sarajevo		
1972–1977	Sloboda Tuzla	18	(3)
- * Club domestic league appearances and goals

Džemil Cerić (born 7 August 1949 in Tuzla, FPR Yugoslavia) is a retired Bosnian-Herzegovinian and Yugoslav professional footballer.

== Club career ==
A graduate of the Sloboda Tuzla youth department, he started his senior career with Croatian powerhouse Dinamo Zagreb in 1968. He further played for Sloboda Tuzla and FK Sarajevo, before retiring prematurely because of chronic injuries in 1977.
