= Salih Šehović =

Bosnian footballer (1936–2022)

Personal information
- Date of birth: 11 May 1936
- Place of birth: Trebinje, Yugoslavia
- Date of death: 27 January 2022 (aged 85)
- Place of death: Bern, Switzerland
- Position: Forward

Senior career*
| Years | Team | Apps | (Gls) |
| 1952–1954 | Leotar | 31 | (18) |
| 1954–1965 | FK Sarajevo | 264 | (185) |
| 1965–1966 | Dinamo Zagreb | 4 | (0) |
| Total | | 299 | (203) |
- * Club domestic league appearances and goals

Salih Šehović (11 May 1936 – 27 January 2022) was a Bosnian professional footballer who played as a forward and spent most of his career in FK Sarajevo.

He is the club's third ranked all time goalscorer, behind Dobrivoje Živkov and legendary Asim Ferhatović. He scored 75 goals in 181 official matches for them.

He died in Bern on 27 January 2022, at the age of 85.
