= Edhem Šljivo =

Bosnian footballer (born 1950)

Personal information
- Date of birth: 16 March 1950 (age 76)
- Place of birth: Sarajevo, FPR Yugoslavia
- Height: 1.78 m (5 ft 10 in)
- Position: Midfielder

Youth career
- 1964–1968: FK Sarajevo

Senior career*
Years	Team	Apps	(Gls)
1968–1978	FK Sarajevo	268	(37)
1978–1981	RFC Liège	91	(29)
1981–1982	Nice	36	(3)
1981–1982	Nice B	1	(0)
1982–1984	1. FC Köln	32	(2)
1983–1987	RFC Liège	101	(14)
Total		529	(85)

International career
1976–1982	Yugoslavia	12	(2)
- * Club domestic league appearances and goals

Edhem "Etko" Šljivo (pronounced [edxem ʃʎiʋo]; born 16 March 1950) is a Bosnian former professional footballer. He started his career with FK Sarajevo, going on to become one of the best midfielders of the Yugoslav First League. At international level, he represented the Yugoslavia national team.

== Club career ==
Born in Sarajevo, Edhem Šljivo joined FK Sarajevo as a kid from elementary school, passed through all club's age categories, and made his first senior team debut at the age of 18. He played 424 games for the club in all competitions, counting friendlies. In Yugoslav First League and Yugoslav Cup (Serbo-Croatian: Kup Maršala Tita) he played for the club 268 games scoring 37 times.

In 1978, he joined Belgian side RFC Liège, whom he represented for three seasons. He made his debut for them 30 August 1978 against Winterslag and later made a move to the French Ligue 1 and joined OGC Nice. From Nice he moved to 1. FC Köln on personal insistence of Rinus Michels and after winning the German cup (the first Bosnian to do so) he moved back to Liège. There he concluded his career in 1987 after a traffic collision on 17 December 1986, in which he was severely injured. Šljivo barely survived a life threatening spinal injuries after 40 days of doctors' struggle to save him. His final game for Liège was on 14 December 1986 against Berchem Sport.

== International career ==
Šljivo debuted for the Yugoslavia national team on 18 February 1976 in a friendly match away against Tunisia. He was capped in 12 official games (four friendlies, five qualifiers for the 1982 FIFA World Cup, and all three matches of the 1982 FIFA World Cup) and scored two goals, while also featuring in two unofficial exhibition-friendlies, 14 games overall. He was first-team regular at play-making midfielder position under Miljan Miljanić, and featured in the same role in 1982 World Cup in Spain. His final international was a June 1982 World Cup match against Honduras.

== Personal life and legacy ==
Šljivo lives and works in Liege, Belgium, where he opened a restaurant "Taverne 8", in reference to a number he used to wear on his shirt as a midfielder. The place is a popular meeting place for Yugoslav expatriate footballers in Belgium and surrounding countries.

=== Challenge Šljivo Tournament ===
The Indoor tournament, largest of its kind in Europe, carrying his name, "Challenge Šljivo", with seniors Futsal competition as a main event, is organized in his honor in Marche-en-Famenne, during pre-New Year Eve week for over three decades. Tournament comprises several competitions in Indoor varieties of Association football, for all categories and age. It takes place at Wallonie Expo S.A. (WEX) venue, in Marche-en-Famenne, on eight pitches. Qualifying rounds of the competitions including more than 400 teams and 5.000 football players, while games are followed up to 40.000 spectators in attendance. In final round 72 qualified teams take part. Tournament is very popular, with final game being in live broadcast in Belgium by public TV service.

=== Family ===
Edhem Šljivo's brother Mehmed was also a football player. He played for Edhem’s FK Sarajevo bitter city rivals, in the "blue side of the city", FK Željezničar Sarajevo.

== Career statistics ==
=== Club ===
Appearances and goals by club, season and competition
Club	Season	League			National cup (Note: Includes DFB-Pokal)		Continental		Total	
Club	Season	Division	Apps	Goals	Apps	Goals	Apps	Goals	Apps	Goals
FK Sarajevo	1968-69	1	15	0						
FK Sarajevo	1969–70	1	34	1						
FK Sarajevo	1970–71	1	26	2						
FK Sarajevo	1971–72	1	33	3						
FK Sarajevo	1972–73	1	30	2						
FK Sarajevo	1973–74	1	33	5						
FK Sarajevo	1974–75	1	32	9						
FK Sarajevo	1975–76	1	33	9						
FK Sarajevo	1977–78	1	32	6						
FK Sarajevo	Total		268	37						
RFC Liège	1978–79	1	31	13						
RFC Liège	1979–80	1	30	8						
RFC Liège	1980–81	1	30	8						
RFC Liège	Total		91	29						
Nice (B)	1981–82		1	0						
Nice	1981–82	1	36	3						
1. FC Köln	1982–83	1	28	2	5	1	6	2	39	5
1. FC Köln	1983–84	1	4	0	1	0	4	0	9	0
1. FC Köln	Total		32	2	6	1	10	2	48	5
RFC Liège	1983–84	1	23	6						
RFC Liège	1984–85	1	33	7						
RFC Liège	1985–86	1	30	1			4	0		
RFC Liège	1986–87	1	15	0						
RFC Liège	Total		101	14			4	0		
Career total			529	85						

=== International ===
Appearances and goals by national team and year
National team	Year	Apps	Goals
Yugoslavia	1976	3	1
Yugoslavia	1980	2	0
Yugoslavia	1981	4	1
Yugoslavia	1982	3	0
Total		12	2
