= Đuka Lovrić =

Yugoslav footballer

Personal information
- Date of birth: 23 August 1927
- Place of birth: Sarajevo, Kingdom of Yugoslavia
- Date of death: 20 February 1957 (aged 29)
- Place of death: Sarajevo, FPR Yugoslavia
- Position: Midfielder

Senior career*
Years	Team	Apps	(Gls)
1945–1946	Sloboda	19	(4)
1946–1955	FK Sarajevo	196	(78)
- * Club domestic league appearances and goals

Đuka Lovrić (born 23 August 1927 in Sarajevo, Kingdom of Yugoslavia - died 20 February 1957 in Sarajevo, FPR Yugoslavia) was a Yugoslav professional footballer. He fell in love with the game by watching his older brother, Bosnian footballer Franjo Lovrić, play.

== Club career ==
After the end of the war he joined newly-formed Sloboda with his brother and the two eventually joined SD Torpedo which was formed a year later by the fusion of Sloboda and another Sarajevo-based side, Udarnik and later renamed FK Sarajevo. He spent 9 years playing for FK Sarajevo during which time he earned 196 caps and scored 78 goals for the maroon-whites, earning him a call-up to the Yugoslavia national team for a friendly against England in Belgrade in 1954. He did however not play.

In the autumn of 1954 he became terminally ill and soon after had to retire from professional football at the age of 27. He played his last match for FK Sarajevo on 5 June 1955 against NK Zagreb.

== Death ==
Lovrić died in Sarajevo, FPR Yugoslavia in 1957, at the age of just 30.
