= Franjo Lovrić =

Yugoslav footballer and manager (1923–1982)

Personal information
- Date of birth: 1 April 1923
- Place of birth: Sarajevo, Kingdom of SCS
- Date of death: 5 February 1982 (aged 58)
- Place of death: Sarajevo, SFR Yugoslavia
- Position: Midfielder

Senior career*
Years	Team	Apps	(Gls)
1938–1941	SAŠK		
1945–1947	Željezničar	63	(23)
1947–1959	FK Sarajevo	209	(59)

International career
1956	Yugoslavia B	1	(0)

Managerial career
- 1965–1967: FK Sarajevo (assistant)
- 1967–1968: FK Sarajevo
- * Club domestic league appearances and goals

Franjo Lovrić (1 April 1923 – 5 February 1982) was a Bosnian and Yugoslav professional footballer and manager who captained FK Sarajevo as a player, and then went on to manage it a decade later.

== Playing career ==
=== Club ===
He began his career in 1938 with local Sarajevo club SAŠK, whom he represented until the Nazi invasion of Yugoslavia in 1941. After the end of the war the new communist authorities placed a ban on numerous football clubs throughout the country including SAŠK. He quickly joined Željezničar, but wore the blue jersey for only two seasons, eventually moving to newly-formed FK Sarajevo in 1947. He would go on to play and captain the club for another 12 years.

=== International ===
He was capped once for Yugoslavia B.

== Managerial career ==
After retiring from professional football he became part of the club's youth coaching staff, a position he held until 1965 when he was named assistant to manager and former team colleague Miroslav Brozović. The duo would go on to win the club's first Yugoslav League title in 1967. After Brozović's departure he took over the helm and led Sarajevo for one more season.

== Personal life ==
His younger brother Đuka Lovrić was also a FK Sarajevo player but died prematurely in 1957 as the result of a serious heart condition.

=== Death ===
Lovrić died on 5 February 1982 in Sarajevo, SFR Yugoslavia, at the age of 58.
