= 1990–91 FK Sarajevo season =

Sarajevo
1990–91 season
- director: Svetozar Vujović
- President: Kemal Hujić
- Manager: Rajko Rašević; Srboljub Markušević; Fuad Muzurović
- Stadium: Koševo City Stadium
- Yugoslav First League: 11th
- Yugoslav Cup: Round of 16
- Top goalscorer: League: Dane Kuprešanin (13); All: Dane Kuprešanin (14)
- Highest home attendance: 15,000 vs Red Star
- Lowest home attendance: 200 vs Borac Čačak
- Average home league attendance: 3,079
- Biggest win: Sarajevo 6–1 Borac Čačak (8 August 1990)
- Biggest defeat: Dinamo Zagreb 8–1 Sarajevo (21 April 1991)

The 1990–91 Sarajevo season was the club's 44th season in history, and their 42nd season in the top flight of Yugoslav football, the Yugoslav First League. Besides competing in the First League, the team competed in the National Cup.

== Squad information ==
=== First-team squad ===
Note: Flags indicate national team as defined under FIFA eligibility rules; some limited exceptions apply. Players may hold more than one non-FIFA nationality.

No.	Pos.	Nation	Player
1	GK	URS	Aleksei Prudnikov
—	GK	YUG	Hajrudin Čardaklija
—	GK	YUG	Dragoslav Vukadin
—	GK	YUG	Predrag Jušić
—	DF	YUG	Srđan Bajić
—	DF	YUG	Aleksandar Guzina
—	DF	YUG	Goran Šljivić
—	DF	YUG	Dejan Raičković
—	DF	YUG	Vejsil Varupa
—	DF	YUG	Nudžein Geca
—	DF	YUG	Memnun Suljagić
—	DF	YUG	Srđan Slagalo
9	DF	YUG	Miloš Nedić
—	DF	YUG	Risto Vidaković
—	MF	YUG	Sretko Vuksanović
—	MF	YUG	Senad Repuh
—	MF	YUG	Senad Merdanović

No.	Pos.	Nation	Player
—	MF	YUG	Ismet Mulavdić
—	MF	YUG	Miodrag Ćirković
—	MF	YUG	Muslija Ramović
—	MF	YUG	Igor Lazić
—	MF	YUG	Dane Kuprešanin (captain)
—	MF	YUG	Haris Jaganjac
—	MF	YUG	Emir Vazda
—	MF	YUG	Zoran Ljubičić
—	FW	YUG	Miralem Ramić
—	FW	YUG	Skender Bišević
—	FW	YUG	Nermin Čengić
—	FW	YUG	Haris Karamehmedović
—	FW	YUG	Goran Kovačević
—	FW	YUG	Davor Jakovljević
9	FW	YUG	Husref Musemić
—	FW	YUG	Bernard Barnjak
—	FW	YUG	Antal Puhalak

== Kit ==
Supplier	Sponsor
(Germany) Uhlsport	(Germany) Volkswagen (Germany) Audi

== Competitions ==
=== Overview ===
Competition	First match	Last match	Starting round	Final position	Record							
Competition	First match	Last match	Starting round	Final position	Pld	W	D	L	GF	GA	GD	Win %
Yugoslav First League	5 August 1990	16 June 1991	Matchday 1	11th	36	13	10	13	37	48	−11	36.11
Yugoslav Cup	8 August 1990	22 August 1990	Round of 32	Round of 16	3	1	0	2	7	6	+1	33.33
Total					39	14	10	15	44	54	−10	35.90

Source: Competitions

=== Yugoslav First League ===
==== League table ====
Pos	Team	Pld	W	PKW	PKL	L	GF	GA	GD	Pts	Qualification or relegation
9	Osijek (Note: After the season, Croatian and Slovenian clubs left the Yugoslav federation and formed their own leagues. Dinamo Zagreb, Hajduk Split, Osijek and Rijeka joined 1992 Prva HNL, while Olimpija joined 1991–92 Slovenian PrvaLiga.)	36	14	4	2	16	52	57	−5	32	Qualification for Prva HNL
10	Radnički Niš	36	14	4	1	17	35	49	−14	32	
11	Sarajevo	36	13	5	5	13	37	48	−11	31	
12	Velež	36	12	6	4	14	54	55	−1	30	
13	Zemun	36	12	6	4	14	40	53	−13	30	

Source: rsssf.org
Rules for classification: 1) points; 2) goal difference; 3) number of goals scored.

==== Matches ====
5 August 1990 1	Željezničar	1–1 (4–3 p)	Sarajevo	Sarajevo
		Report		Stadium: Stadion Grbavica; Attendance: 15,000

12 August 1990 2	Sarajevo	2–0	Olimpija	Sarajevo
		Report		Stadium: Koševo City Stadium; Attendance: 4,000

19 August 1990 3	Budućnost	4–0	Sarajevo	Podgorica
		Report		Stadium: Podgorica City Stadium; Attendance: 7,000

26 August 1990 4	Sarajevo	0–0 (4–3 p)	Velež	Sarajevo
		Report		Stadium: Koševo City Stadium; Attendance: 4,000

2 September 1990 5	Rijeka	2–0	Sarajevo	Rijeka
		Report		Stadium: Stadion Kantrida; Attendance: 2,000

16 September 1990 6	Sarajevo	1–0	Borac	Sarajevo
		Report		Stadium: Koševo City Stadium; Attendance: 3,000

23 September 1990 7	Partizan	2–0	Sarajevo	Belgrade
		Report		Stadium: JNA Stadium; Attendance: 10,000

26 September 1990 8	Sarajevo	1–0	Zemun	Sarajevo
		Report		Stadium: Koševo City Stadium; Attendance: 1,000

7 October 1990 9	Sarajevo	0–0 (4–5 p)	Dinamo	Sarajevo
		Report		Stadium: Koševo City Stadium; Attendance: 6,000

13 October 1990 10	Osijek	1–0	Sarajevo	Osijek
		Report		Stadium: Gradski Vrt Stadium; Attendance: 600

21 October 1990 11	Vojvodina	4–3	Sarajevo	Novi Sad
		Report		Stadium: Stadion Vojvodine; Attendance: 4,000

4 November 1990 12	Sarajevo	1–1 (4–2 p)	Hajduk	Sarajevo
		Report		Stadium: Koševo City Stadium; Attendance: 7,000

18 November 1990 13	Spartak	1–1 (2–4 p)	Sarajevo	Subotica
		Report		Stadium: Subotica City Stadium; Attendance: 1,000

25 November 1990 14	Sarajevo	0–0 (6–5 p)	Sloboda	Sarajevo
		Report		Stadium: Koševo City Stadium; Attendance: 2,000

2 December 1990 15	Red Star	4–1	Sarajevo	Belgrade
		Report		Stadium: Marakana Stadium; Attendance: 3,000

5 December 1990 16	Sarajevo	1–1 (2–4 p)	Rad	Sarajevo
		Report		Stadium: Koševo City Stadium; Attendance: 3,000

9 December 1990 17	Proleter	5–0	Sarajevo	Zrenjanin
		Report		Stadium: Stadion Karađorđev park Attendance: 3,000

16 December 1990 18	Sarajevo	3–0	Radnički	Sarajevo
		Report		Stadium: Koševo City Stadium; Attendance: 1,000

17 February 1991 19	Sarajevo	1–1 (2–4 p)	Željezničar	Sarajevo
		Report		Stadium: Koševo City Stadium; Attendance: 6,000

24 February 1991 20	Olimpija	1–0	Sarajevo	Ljubljana
		Report		Stadium: Bežigrad Stadium; Attendance: 2,000

3 March 1991 21	Sarajevo	1–0	Budućnost	Sarajevo
		Report		Stadium: Koševo City Stadium; Attendance: 3,000

10 March 1991 22	Velež	0–0 (5–4 p)	Sarajevo	Mostar
		Report		Stadium: Bijeli Brijeg Stadium; Attendance: 5,000

17 March 1991 23	Sarajevo	1–0	Rijeka	Sarajevo
		Report		Stadium: Koševo City Stadium; Attendance: 2,000

23 March 1991 24	Borac	3–0	Sarajevo	Banja Luka
		Report		Stadium: Banja Luka City Stadium; Attendance: 5,000

31 March 1991 25	Sarajevo	1–0	Partizan	Sarajevo
		Report		Stadium: Koševo City Stadium; Attendance: 7,000

6 April 1991 26	Zemun	1–0	Sarajevo	Zemun
		Report		Stadium: Zemun Stadium; Attendance: 3,000

21 April 1991 27	Dinamo	8–1	Sarajevo	Zagreb
		Report		Stadium: Stadion Maksimir; Attendance: 6,000

26 April 1991 28	Sarajevo	2–0	Osijek	Sarajevo
		Report		Stadium: Koševo City Stadium; Attendance: 3,500

5 May 1991 29	Sarajevo	1–0	Vojvodina	Sarajevo
		Report		Stadium: Koševo City Stadium; Attendance: 2,500

11 May 1991 30	Hajduk	2–0	Sarajevo	Split
		Report		Stadium: Stadion Poljud; Attendance: 3,000

19 May 1991 31	Sarajevo	4–1	Spartak	Sarajevo
		Report		Stadium: Koševo City Stadium; Attendance: 1,500

26 May 1991 32	Sloboda	0–4	Sarajevo	Tuzla
		Report		Stadium: Tušanj City Stadium; Attendance: 5,000

2 June 1991 33	Sarajevo	3–2	Red Star	Sarajevo
		Report		Stadium: Koševo City Stadium; Attendance: 15,000

6 June 1991 34	Rad	0–0 (4–5 p)	Sarajevo	Belgrade
		Report		Stadium: Stadion Banjica; Attendance: 1,000

9 June 1991 35	Sarajevo	3–1	Proleter	Sarajevo
		Report		Stadium: Koševo City Stadium; Attendance: 2,000

16 June 1991 36	Radnički	2–0	Sarajevo	Niš
		Report		Stadium: Čair Stadium; Attendance: 5,000

=== Yugoslav Cup ===
==== Round of 32 ====
8 August 1990	Sarajevo	6–1	Borac Čačak	Sarajevo
20:00 CEST (UTC+2)		Report		Stadium: Koševo City Stadium; Attendance: 200

==== Round of 16 ====
15 August 1990 First leg	Dinamo Zagreb	1–0	Sarajevo	Rijeka
20:00 CEST (UTC+2)		Report		Stadium: Stadion Kantrida; Attendance: 2,000

22 August 1990 Second leg	Sarajevo	1–4 (1–5 agg.)	Dinamo Zagreb	Sarajevo
19:30 CEST (UTC+2)		Report		Stadium: Koševo City Stadium; Attendance: 5,000

== Statistics ==
Appearances

Rank	Player	Games
1	Risto Vidaković	37
2	Vejsil Varupa	36
3	Srđan Bajić	35
4	Muslija Ramović	35

Goalscorers

Rank	Player	Goals
1	Dane Kuprešanin	14
2	Miloš Nedić	10
3	Bernard Barnjak	9
4	Muslija Ramović	7
