= 1989–90 FK Sarajevo season =

Sarajevo
1989–90 season
- Sporting director: Svetozar Vujović
- President: Kemal Hujić
- Manager: Džemaludin Mušović; Rajko Rašević
- Stadium: Koševo City Stadium
- Yugoslav First League: 13th
- Yugoslav Cup: Round of 16
- Top goalscorer: League: B. Božović 13; All: Boban Božović (13)
- Highest home attendance: 20,000 vs Red Star (22 October 1989); 20,000 vs Partizan (25 February 1990)
- Lowest home attendance: 500 vs Sloboda Užice (2 August 1989)
- Average home league attendance: 6,547
- Biggest win: Sarajevo 6–1 Vardar (16 May 1990)
- Biggest defeat: Dinamo 6–0 Sarajevo (5 November 1989)

The 1989–90 Sarajevo season was the club's 43rd season in history, and their 41st season in the top flight of Yugoslav football, the Yugoslav First League. Besides competing in the First League, the team competed in the National Cup.

== Squad information ==
=== First-team squad ===
Note: Flags indicate national team as defined under FIFA eligibility rules; some limited exceptions apply. Players may hold more than one non-FIFA nationality.

No.	Pos.	Nation	Player
1	GK	YUG	Dragoslav Vukadin
2 13	DF	YUG	Srđan Bajić
3	DF	YUG	Dejan Raičković
4	DF	YUG	Suad Golubić
5	DF	YUG	Vejsil Varupa
6	DF	YUG	Miloš Nedić
7	DF	YUG	Goran Šljivić
8 18	MF	YUG	Dane Kuprešanin
—	GK	YUG	Predrag Jušić
—	GK	YUG	Enver Lugušić
—	DF	YUG	Nudžein Geca
—	DF	YUG	Aleksandar Guzina
—	DF	YUG	Suvad Rovčanin
—	DF	YUG	Risto Vidaković
—	MF	YUG	Haris Jaganjac

No.	Pos.	Nation	Player
9	FW	YUG	Franjo Vuleta
10	MF	YUG	Igor Lazić
11	MF	YUG	Boban Božović (Captain)
12	GK	YUG	Hajrudin Čardaklija
13	DF	YUG	Edin Omanović
14	MF	YUG	Zoran Ljubičić
15	FW	YUG	Davor Jakovljević
16	MF	YUG	Miodrag Ćirković
—	MF	YUG	Ismet Mulavdić
—	MF	YUG	Muslija Ramović
—	FW	YUG	Haris Karamehmedović
—	FW	YUG	Goran Kovačević
—	FW	YUG	Husref Musemić
—	FW	YUG	Denijal Purković
—	FW	YUG	Nermin Vazda

== Kit ==
Supplier	Sponsor
(Germany) Uhlsport	(Germany) Volkswagen, (Germany) Audi

== Competitions ==
=== Overview ===
Competition	First match	Last match	Starting round	Final position	Record							
Competition	First match	Last match	Starting round	Final position	Pld	W	D	L	GF	GA	GD	Win %
Yugoslav First League	30 July 1989	31 July 1990	Matchday 1	13th	34	13	4	17	46	49	−3	38.24
Yugoslav Cup	2 August 1989	16 August 1989	Round of 32	Round of 16	3	2	0	1	3	1	+2	66.67
Total					37	15	4	18	49	50	−1	40.54

Source: Competitions

=== Yugoslav First League ===
==== League table ====
Pos	Team	Pld	W	PKW	PKL	L	GF	GA	GD	Pts
11	Vojvodina	34	13	3	3	15	43	51	−8	29
12	Spartak Subotica	34	12	4	2	16	28	40	−12	28
13	Sarajevo	34	13	1	3	17	46	49	−3	27
14	Borac Banja Luka	34	12	3	4	15	28	40	−12	27
15	Radnički Niš	34	12	2	6	14	42	48	−6	26

Source: rsssf.org
Rules for classification: 1) points; 2) goal difference; 3) number of goals scored.

==== Matches ====
30 July 1989 1	Sarajevo	1–3	Željezničar	Sarajevo
		Report		Stadium: Koševo City Stadium; Attendance: 16,000

6 August 1989 2	Osijek	2–0	Sarajevo	Osijek
		Report		Stadium: Gradski Vrt Stadium; Attendance: 2,000

13 August 1989 3	Sarajevo	1–0	Hajduk	Sarajevo
		Report		Stadium: Koševo City Stadium; Attendance: 6,000

20 August 1989 4	Partizan	1–1 (3–5 p)	Sarajevo	Belgrade
		Report		Stadium: JNA Stadium; Attendance: 20,000

27 August 1989 5	Sarajevo	5–1	Radnički	Sarajevo
		Report		Stadium: Koševo City Stadium; Attendance: 4,000

10 September 1989 6	Borac	2–0	Sarajevo	Banja Luka
		Report		Stadium: Banja Luka City Stadium; Attendance: 10,000

17 September 1989 7	Sarajevo	2–0	Rijeka	Sarajevo
		Report		Stadium: Koševo City Stadium; Attendance: 4,000

24 September 1989 8	Budućnost	1–0	Sarajevo	Podgorica
		Report		Stadium: Podgorica City Stadium; Attendance: 6,000

1 October 1989 9	Sarajevo	0–0 (3–4 p)	Velež	Sarajevo
		Report		Stadium: Koševo City Stadium; Attendance: 6,000

7 October 1989 10	Sarajevo	1–0	Rad	Sarajevo
		Report		Stadium: Koševo City Stadium; Attendance: 3,000

15 October 1989 11	Olimpija	2–1	Sarajevo	Ljubljana
		Report		Stadium: Bežigrad Stadium; Attendance: 7,000

22 October 1989 12	Sarajevo	3–1	Red Star	Sarajevo
		Report		Stadium: Koševo City Stadium; Attendance: 20,000

5 November 1989 13	Dinamo	6–0	Sarajevo	Zagreb
		Report		Stadium: Stadion Maksimir; Attendance: 10,000

12 November 1989 14	Sarajevo	3–3 (2–4 p)	Spartak	Sarajevo
		Report		Stadium: Koševo City Stadium; Attendance: 3,000

19 November 1989 15	Sloboda	2–0	Sarajevo	Tuzla
		Report		Stadium: Tušanj City Stadium; Attendance: 2,000

26 November 1989 16	Sarajevo	3–2	Vojvodina	Sarajevo
		Report		Stadium: Koševo City Stadium; Attendance: 800

3 December 1989 17	Vardar	2–1	Sarajevo	Skopje
		Report		Stadium: Gradski Stadion Skopje; Attendance: 3,000

10 December 1989 18	Željezničar	1–0	Sarajevo	Sarajevo
		Report		Stadium: Stadion Grbavica; Attendance: 12,000

17 December 1989 19	Sarajevo	3–0	Osijek	Sarajevo
		Report		Stadium: Koševo City Stadium; Attendance: 2,000

18 February 1990 20	Hajduk	0–0 (4–3 p)	Sarajevo	Split
		Report		Stadium: Stadion Poljud; Attendance: 0

25 February 1990 21	Sarajevo	1–2	Partizan	Sarajevo
		Report		Stadium: Koševo City Stadium; Attendance: 20,000

4 March 1990 22	Radnički	1–0	Sarajevo	Niš
		Report		Stadium: Čair Stadium; Attendance: 4,000

11 March 1990 23	Sarajevo	2–0	Borac	Sarajevo
		Report		Stadium: Koševo City Stadium; Attendance: 5,000

18 March 1990 24	Rijeka	1–0	Sarajevo	Rijeka
		Report		Stadium: Stadion Kantrida; Attendance: 3,000

25 March 1990 25	Sarajevo	4–1	Budućnost	Sarajevo
		Report		Stadium: Koševo City Stadium; Attendance: 2,000

1 April 1990 26	Velež	3–1	Sarajevo	Mostar
		Report		Stadium: Bijeli Brijeg Stadium; Attendance: 10,000

7 April 1990 27	Rad	3–0	Sarajevo	Belgrade
		Report		Stadium: Stadion Banjica; Attendance: 3,000

15 April 1990 28	Sarajevo	3–0	Olimpija	Sarajevo
		Report		Stadium: Koševo City Stadium; Attendance: 4,000

22 April 1990 29	Red Star	3–0	Sarajevo	Belgrade
		Report		Stadium: Marakana Stadium; Attendance: 20,000

29 April 1990 31	Spartak	2–0	Sarajevo	Subotica
		Report		Stadium: Subotica City Stadium; Attendance: 5,000

6 May 1990 32	Sarajevo	2–1	Sloboda	Sarajevo
		Report		Stadium: Koševo City Stadium; Attendance: 2,500

13 May 1990 33	Vojvodina	2–1	Sarajevo	Novi Sad
		Report		Stadium: Stadion Vojvodine; Attendance: 4,500

16 May 1990 34	Sarajevo	6–1	Vardar	Sarajevo
		Report		Stadium: Koševo City Stadium; Attendance: 1,000

31 July 1990 30	Sarajevo	1–0	Dinamo	Sarajevo
		Report		Stadium: Koševo City Stadium; Attendance: 12,000

=== Yugoslav Cup ===
==== Round of 32 ====
2 August 1989	Sarajevo	2–0	Sloboda Užice	Sarajevo
17:30 CEST (UTC+2)		Report		Stadium: Koševo City Stadium; Attendance: 500

==== Round of 16 ====
9 August 1989 First leg	Sileks	1–0	Sarajevo	Kratovo
17:00 CEST (UTC+2)		Report		Stadium: Gradski Stadion Kratovo; Attendance: 2,000

16 August 1989 Second leg	Sarajevo	1–0 (1–1 agg.) (3–5 p)	Sileks	Sarajevo
19:00 CEST (UTC+2)		Report		Stadium: Koševo City Stadium; Attendance: 2,000
