= 1991–92 FK Sarajevo season =

Sarajevo
1991–92 season
- Sporting director: Svetozar Vujović
- President: Kemal Hujić
- Manager: Fuad Muzurović
- Stadium: Koševo City Stadium
- Yugoslav First League: 9th
- Yugoslav Cup: Round of 32
- Top goalscorer: League: Miloš Nedić 12; All: Miloš Nedić 12
- Highest home attendance: 6,000 vs Red Star Belgrade (6 October 1991)
- Lowest home attendance: 500 vs Vardar (20 October 1991)
- Average home league attendance: 1,923
- Biggest win: Sarajevo 4–1 Budućnost (24 November 1991)
- Biggest defeat: Rad 3–0 Sarajevo (10 August 1991)

The 1991–92 Sarajevo season was the club's 45th season in history, and their 43rd season in the top flight of Yugoslav football, the Yugoslav First League. Besides competing in the First League, the team competed in the National Cup.

== Squad information ==
=== First-team squad ===
Note: Flags indicate national team as defined under FIFA eligibility rules; some limited exceptions apply. Players may hold more than one non-FIFA nationality.

| No. | Pos. | Nation | Player |
|---|---|---|---|
| — | GK | YUG | Mirsad Dedić |
| — | GK | YUG | Anto Jakovljević |
| — | DF | YUG | Ibrahim Duro |
| — | DF | YUG | Said Fazlagić |
| — | DF | YUG | Nudžein Geca |
| — | DF | YUG | Miloš Nedić (3rd captain) |
| — | DF | YUG | Edin Omanović |
| — | DF | YUG | Dejan Raičković (Vice-captain) |
| — | DF | YUG | Srđan Slagalo |
| — | DF | YUG | Memnun Suljagić |
| — | DF | YUG | Goran Šljivić |
| — | DF | YUG | Mirza Varešanović |
| — | DF | YUG | Vejsil Varupa |
| — | DF | YUG | Risto Vidaković (Captain) |
| — | MF | YUG | Samir Abdurahmanović |

| No. | Pos. | Nation | Player |
|---|---|---|---|
| — | MF | YUG | Murat Jašarević |
| — | MF | YUG | Igor Lazić |
| — | MF | YUG | Samir Mekić |
| — | MF | YUG | Senad Merdanović |
| — | MF | YUG | Željko Mijović |
| — | MF | YUG | Ismet Mulavdić |
| — | MF | YUG | Senad Repuh |
| — | MF | YUG | Emir Vazda |
| — | MF | YUG | Sretko Vuksanović |
| — | FW | YUG | Slobodan Franković |
| — | FW | YUG | Senad Lupić |
| — | FW | YUG | Hidajet Mehremić |
| — | FW | YUG | Vladimir Papović |
| — | FW | YUG | Dinko Vrabac |

== Kit ==
| Supplier | Sponsor |
|---|---|
| (Germany) Uhlsport | (Germany) VW, (Germany) Audi (Socialist Federal Republic of Yugoslavia) Cenex |

== Competitions ==
=== Overview ===
| Competition | First match | Last match | Starting round | Final position | Record | | | | | | | |
| Competition | First match | Last match | Starting round | Final position | Pld | W | D | L | GF | GA | GD | Win % |
|---|---|---|---|---|---|---|---|---|---|---|---|---|
| Yugoslav First League | 10 August 1991 | 5 April 1992 | Matchday 1 | 9th | 32 | 12 | 6 | 14 | 33 | 45 | −12 | 37.50 |
| Yugoslav Cup | 14 August 1991 | | Round of 32 | Round of 32 | 1 | 0 | 0 | 1 | 0 | 1 | −1 | 0.00 |
| Total | | | | | 33 | 12 | 6 | 15 | 33 | 46 | −13 | 36.36 |

Source: Competitions

=== Yugoslav First League ===
==== League table ====
| Pos | Team | Pld | W | PKW | PKL | L | GF | GA | GD | Pts |
|---|---|---|---|---|---|---|---|---|---|---|
| 7 | Rad | 33 | 14 | 1 | 2 | 16 | 48 | 43 | +5 | 29 |
| 8 | Borac Banja Luka | 33 | 11 | 6 | 4 | 12 | 24 | 32 | −8 | 28 |
| 9 | Sarajevo | 32 | 12 | 3 | 3 | 14 | 33 | 45 | −12 | 27 |
| 10 | Zemun | 33 | 12 | 2 | 5 | 14 | 44 | 43 | +1 | 26 |
| 11 | Radnički Niš | 33 | 12 | 2 | 3 | 16 | 37 | 48 | −11 | 26 |

Source: rsssf.org
Rules for classification: 1) points; 2) goal difference; 3) number of goals scored.

==== Matches ====
| 10 August 1991 1 | Rad | 3–0 | Sarajevo | Belgrade |
| | | Report | | Stadium: Stadion Banjica; Attendance: 2,000 |

| 17 August 1991 2 | Zemun | 2–0 | Sarajevo | Zemun |
| | | Report | | Stadium: Zemun Stadium; Attendance: 2,000 |

| 25 August 1991 3 | Sarajevo | 1–0 | Sutjeska | Sarajevo |
| | | Report | | Stadium: Koševo City Stadium; Attendance: 1,500 |

| 1 September 1991 4 | Velež | 2–2 | Sarajevo | Mostar |
| | | Report | | Stadium: Stadion pod Bijelim Brijegom; Attendance: 3,000 |

| 8 September 1991 5 | Sarajevo | 2–1 | Vojvodina | Sarajevo |
| | | Report | | Stadium: Koševo City Stadium; Attendance: 1,500 |

| 15 September 1991 6 | Radnički | 3–1 | Sarajevo | Niš |
| | | Report | | Stadium: Čair Stadium; Attendance: 2,000 |

| 22 September 1991 7 | Sarajevo | 2–1 | Spartak | Sarajevo |
| | | Report | | Stadium: Koševo City Stadium; Attendance: 1,000 |

| 29 September 1991 8 | Borac | 0–0 | Sarajevo | Banja Luka |
| | | Report | | Stadium: Banja Luka City Stadium; Attendance: 2,500 |

| 6 October 1991 9 | Sarajevo | 1–0 | Red Star | Sarajevo |
| | | Report | | Stadium: Koševo City Stadium; Attendance: 6,000 |

| 9 October 1991 10 | Željezničar | 0–0 | Sarajevo | Sarajevo |
| | | Report | | Stadium: Stadion Grbavica; Attendance: 10,000 |

| 20 October 1991 11 | Sarajevo | 1–0 | Vardar | Sarajevo |
| | | Report | | Stadium: Koševo City Stadium; Attendance: 500 |

| 27 October 1991 12 | Pelister | 1–0 | Sarajevo | Bitola |
| | | Report | | Stadium: Tumbe Kafe Stadium; Attendance: 3,000 |

| 3 November 1991 13 | Sarajevo | 3–0 | Proleter | Sarajevo |
| | | Report | | Stadium: Koševo City Stadium; Attendance: 3,000 |

| 17 November 1991 14 | Sloboda | 1–0 | Sarajevo | Tuzla |
| | | Report | | Stadium: Tušanj City Stadium; Attendance: 2,000 |

| 24 November 1991 15 | Sarajevo | 4–1 | Budućnost | Sarajevo |
| | | Report | | Stadium: Koševo City Stadium; Attendance: 2,000 |

| 1 December 1991 16 | OFK Beograd | 1–3 | Sarajevo | Belgrade |
| | | Report | | Stadium: Omladinski Stadium; Attendance: 1,500 |

| 8 December 1991 17 | Sarajevo | 0–0 | Partizan | Sarajevo |
| | | Report | | Stadium: Koševo City Stadium; Attendance: 2,000 |

| 16 February 1992 18 | Sarajevo | 2–1 | Rad | Sarajevo |
| | | Report | | Stadium: Koševo City Stadium; Attendance: 1,500 |

| 23 February 1992 19 | Sarajevo | 3–2 | Zemun | Sarajevo |
| | | Report | | Stadium: Koševo City Stadium; Attendance: 1,000 |

| 1 March 1992 20 | Sutjeska | 1–0 | Sarajevo | Nikšić |
| | | Report | | Stadium: Stadion kraj Bistrice; Attendance: 3,000 |

| 8 March 1992 21 | Sarajevo | 0–0 | Velež | Sarajevo |
| | | Report | | Stadium: Koševo City Stadium; Attendance: 2,000 |

| 11 March 1992 22 | Vojvodina | 3–1 | Sarajevo | Novi Sad |
| | | Report | | Stadium: Stadion Vojvodine; Attendance: 2,000 |

| 15 March 1992 23 | Sarajevo | 3–1 | Radnički | Sarajevo |
| | | Report | | Stadium: Koševo City Stadium; Attendance: 2,000 |

| 22 March 1992 24 | Spartak | 0–0 | Sarajevo | Subotica |
| | | Report | | Stadium: Subotica City Stadium; Attendance: 1,000 |

| 29 March 1992 25 | Sarajevo | 3–0 | Borac | Sarajevo |
| | | Report | | Stadium: Koševo City Stadium; Attendance: 1,000 |

| 5 April 1992 26 | Red Star | 3–1 | Sarajevo | Belgrade |
| | | Report | | Stadium: Marakana Stadium; Attendance: 5,000 |

=== Yugoslav Cup ===
==== Round of 32 ====
| 14 August 1991 | Sutjeska | 1–0 | Sarajevo | Nikšić |
| 17:00 CEST (UTC+2) | | Report | | Stadium: Stadion kraj Bistrice; Attendance: 1,000 |
