= Yasar =

Yasar may refer to:

== People ==
- Yaşar (name), a Turkish name, including a list of people with the name
- Mehmet Yasar, 19th century Macedonian politician
- Nedim Yasar (1987–2018), Danish former gangster and radio host of Turkish origin
- Yasar Shah, Indian politician and a member the Legislative Assembly of Uttar Pradesh
- Yasar Onel, Turkish-born Swiss and American physicist

== Places ==
- Yasar, Iran, a village in Khuzestan Province, Iran

== See also ==
- Yaşar (disambiguation)
- Qarah Yasar (disambiguation)
