= Yaşar =

Yaşar may refer to:

- Yaşar (name), a Turkish given name and surname, including a list of people with the name
- Yaşar (singer) (born 1970), Turkish pop singer
- Yaşar, Karkamış, a neighbourhood of Karkamış, Gaziantep Province, Turkey
- Yaşar, Şavşat, a village in Şavşat District, Artvin Province, Turkey
- Yaşar University, in Izmir, Turkey

== See also ==
- Yasar (disambiguation)
- Yashar (disambiguation)
- Selçuk Yaşar (Tram İzmir), light-rail station on the Karşıyaka Tram line of the Tram İzmir network
