= Jashari =

Other names
- Variant forms: Yaşaroğlu, Jašarević

Jashari, meaning "of/relating to Jashar", is an Albanian surname. Notable people with the surname include:

- Abdul Jashari (born 1976), Macedonian Albanian militant
- Adem Jashari (1955–1998), Kosovar soldier
- Adnan Jashari (born 1965), Minister of Justice, lawyer, and member of the Democratic Union for Integration
- Ardon Jashari (born 2002), Swiss footballer
- Baki Jashari, Kosovar composer, conductor and music educator
- Bashkim Jashari (born 1977), Kosovar Albanian three-star general
- Bekim Jashari (born 1975), Kosovo Albanian politician
- Besarta Jashari, Kosovar Albanian survivor and eyewitness of the Attack on Prekaz
- Hamëz Jashari (1950–1998), Kosovar soldier
- Ismet Jashari (1967–1998), Albanian member of the UCK movement
- Kaqusha Jashari (1946–2025), Kosovo Albanian politician and engineer
- Muharrem Jashari (born 1998), Kosovan footballer
- Ragip Jashari (1961–1999), Albanian politician and activist
- Rifat Jashari, Kosovar Albanian public figure and patriarch
- Robert Jashari (1938–2022), Albanian football player
- Shaban Jashari (1924–1998), Kosovar Albanian farmer and patriarch
- Suada Jashari (born 1988), Kosovan-born Albanian former football player and current manager

== See also ==
- Stadiumi Olimpik Adem Jashari, Mitrovica, Kosovo football ground
- Stadiumi Tefik Jashari, Shijak, Albania football ground
