= Yashar =

Yashar may refer to:

== People ==
=== Given name ===
- Yashar Ali (born 1979), American journalist and lobbyist
- Yashar Aliyev (diplomat) (born 1955), Azerbaijani diplomat and United Nations official
- Yashar Aliyev (wrestler) (born ?), Azerbaijani freestyle wrestler
- Yashar Hasanov (born ?), Azerbaijani military officer
- Yashar Kemal (1923–2015), Turkish Kurdish novelist and human rights activist
- Yashar Nuri (1951–2012), Azerbaijani actor
- Yashar Soltani (born ?), Iranian journalist, editor, and anti-corruption activist
- Yashar Vahabzade (born 1960), Azerbaijani footballer
- Yashar Zadeh (a.k.a. Yak Ballz; born 1982), American hip hop artist

=== Surname ===
- Deborah J. Yashar (born 1963), American political scientist and journal editor
- Dzhuneyt Yashar (born 1985), Bulgarian footballer
- Gisele Yashar, fictional character portrayed by Gal Gadot in The Fast and The Furious film franchise

=== Nickname ===
- Isaac Samuel Reggio (1784-1855), Austro-Italian rabbi

== Places ==
- Qerkh Yashar, a village in northwestern Iran
- Yashar Mammadzade Stadium, a sporting venue in Azerbaijan

== Other uses ==
- Yashar (song), a 1983 single by Cabaret Voltaire
- Yashar (political party), an Israeli political party
- Yashar Books, a Jewish Orthodox publishing house owned and operated by Gil Student
- Yashar LaChayal, an Israeli non-profit organization

== See also ==
- Yaşar (disambiguation)
- Yasar (disambiguation)
- Yasha (disambiguation)
- Kav ha-Yashar, a 1705 book of musar literature by Rabbi Tzvi Hirsch Kaidanover
- Sefer haYashar (disambiguation)
