= Jašarević =

Origin
- Language: Bosnian from Turkish
- Meaning: son of Jašar
- Region of origin: Bosnia and Herzegovina

Other names
- Variant form: Jasarevic
- See also: Yaşaroğlu, Jashari

Jašarević (IPA: [ˈjaˌʃarəʋitɕ]) or Jasarevic is a Bosnian surname. It is composed of the masculine Turkish given name and surname Yaşar – the singular, third person conjugation of the Turkish verb yaşamak "to live" and therefore meaning "he/she/it lives" – and the Bosnian patronymic suffix -ević. People with the surname include:

- Ešref Jašarević (born 1951), Yugoslav footballer
- Husein Jašarević (1914–1979), Bosnian footballer
- Irfan Jašarević (born 1995), Bosnian footballer
- Mahir Jasarević (born 1992), Hungarian footballer
- Murat Jašarević (born 1969), former Bosnian footballer
- Senudin Jašarević (born 1955), Bosnian author and journalist
