= Zilek Bridge =

Bridge in Turkey

Zilek Bridge Zilek Köprüsü
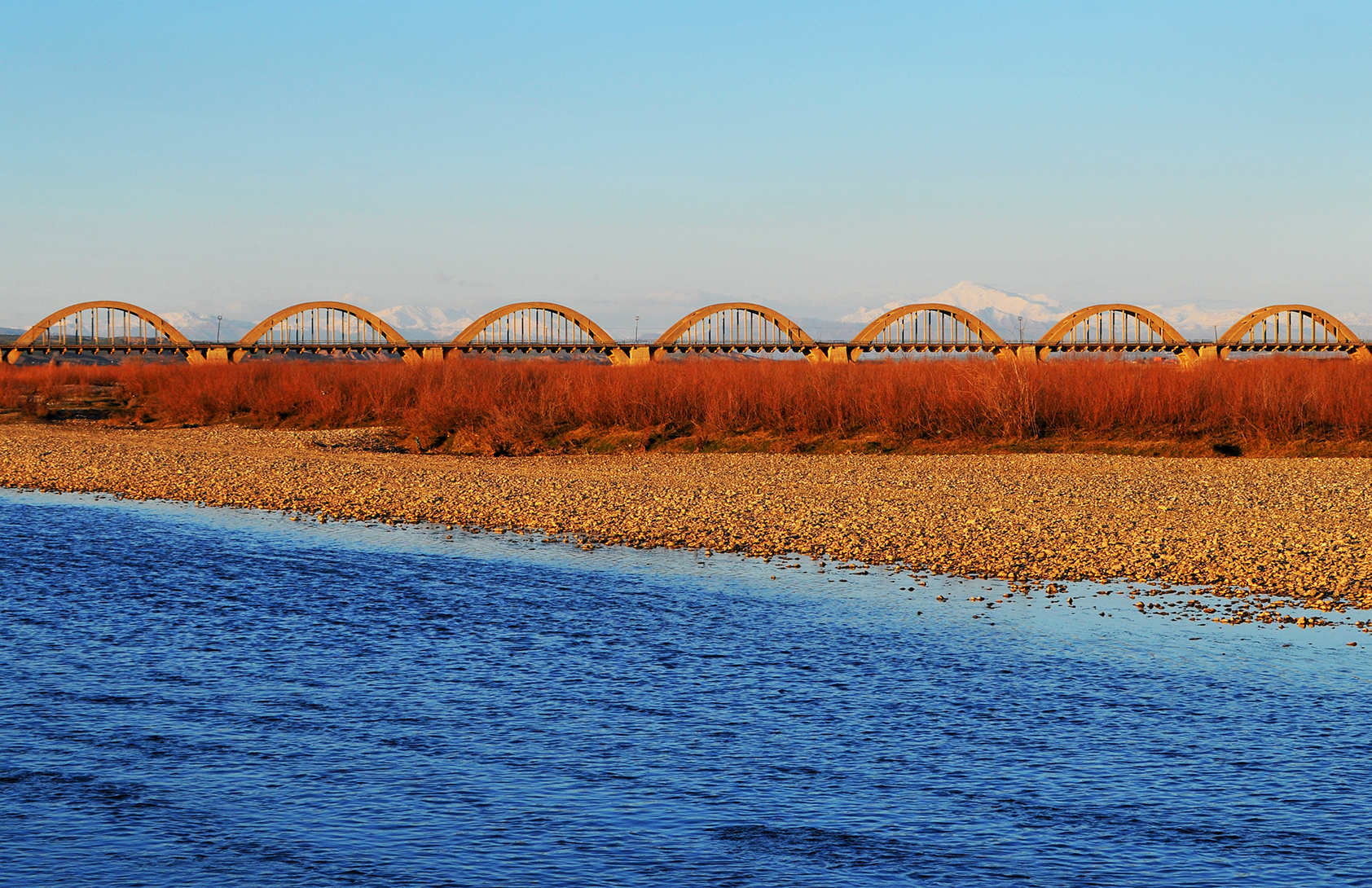
- Coordinates: 37.8291°N 40.9973°E
- Carries: 1 track of the Fevzipaşa-Kurtalan railway
- Crosses: Batman River
- Locale: Ağılköy, Diyarbakır Province and Soğuksu, Batman Province
- Owner: Turkish State Railways

Characteristics
- Material: Reinforced Concrete
- Total length: 508 m (1,667 ft)
- No. of spans: 10

History
- Designer: NOHAB
- Constructed by: Turkish State Railways
- Construction start: 1939
- Construction end: 1944; 81 years ago

The Zilek Bridge is a 508 m (1,667 ft) long Bowstring-arch bridge that crosses the Batman River in southeastern Turkey. Located between the cities Diyarbakır and Batman, the bridge carries the Fevzipaşa-Kurtalan railway.

The bridge was constructed between 1939 and 1944 as part of the extension of the railway from Diyarbakır to Kurtalan. When first completed, it was the second longest railway bridge in the country after the Karkamış Bridge. The bridge has been replaced by a new 1,430 m (4,690 ft) long viaduct that was completed by the end of 2017. The old Zilek bridge has been flooded by the Ilısu Reservoir.
