= Yaşaroğlu =

Origin
- Language: Turkish
- Meaning: son of Yaşar
- Region of origin: Turkey

Other names
- See also: Jašarević, Jashari

Yaşaroğlu (IPA: [ˌjaʃaˈrolu]) or Yasaroglu is a Turkish surname. It is the patronymic of the masculine Turkish given name Yaşar (singular, third person conjugation of the Turkish verb yaşamak "to live" and therefore meaning "he/she/it lives"). People with the surname include:

- Begüm Kütük Yaşaroğlu (born 1980), Turkish actress and model
