= Yaşar (name) =

Yaşar is a masculine Turkish given name, which also appears as a surname that means immortal. In non-Turkish publications, the name would many times appear as Yasar (with no cedilla on the s).

People with the name include:

== Given name ==
=== Yaşar ===
- Yaşar Aliyev (born 1955), Azerbaijani diplomat
- Yaşar Altıntaş (born 1957), Turkish footballer
- Yaşar Alpaslan (1914–1995), Turkish footballer
- Yaşar Bilgin (born 1950), German politician and physician
- Yaşar Turgut Bilgin (born 1957), Turkish author
- Yaşar Büyükanıt (1940–2019), Turkish general, Chief of the Turkish General Staff of the Turkish Armed Forces
- Yaşar Halit Çevik (born 1955), Turkish ambassador
- Yaşar Doğu (1913–1961), Turkish sports wrestler
- Yaşar Erkan (1911–1986), Turkish sports wrestler
- Yaşar Giritli (born 1969), Turkish boxer
- Yaşar Güler (born 1954), Turkish general
- Yasar İsmailoğlu (born 1945), Turkish-Cypriot poet, writer and journalist
- Yaşar Karadağ (born 1976), Turkish politician and educator
- Yaşar Kaya (1938–2016), Kurdish politician
- Yaşar Kemal (1923–2015), Turkish writer and journalist of Kurdish origin
- Yaşar Kurt (born 1968), Turkish musician of Armenian origin
- Yaşar Mumcuoğlu (born 1942), Turkish footballer
- Yaşar Nezihe (1882–1971), Ottoman Turkish poet
- Yaşar Okuyan (1950–2023), Turkish politician
- Yaşar Nuri Öztürk (1951–2016), Turkish politician
- Yaşar Ören (born 1942), Turkish cross-country skier
- Yaşar Topçu (born 1941), Turkish politician and government minister
- Yaşar Tüzün (born 1966), Turkish politician
- Yaşar Yakış (1938–2024), Turkish politician and government minister
- Yaşar Yılmaz (born 1930), Turkish sports wrestler

=== Yasar ===
- Yasar Onel, Turkish-born Swiss and American physicist
- Yasar Shah, Indian politician

== Middle name ==
- Murat Yaşar Günaçgün (born 1970), Turkish pop singer
- Turhan Yaşar Erdoğan (1938–2019), Turkish academic
- Ümit Yaşar Oğuzcan (1926–1984), Turkish poet
- Umit Yasar Toprak (died 2014), Turkish militant and sniper

== Surname ==
=== Yaşar ===
- Ali Yaşar (born 1995), Belgian footballer
- Ebru Yaşar (born 1978), Turkish female musician
- Ece Yaşar (born 1990), Turkish female karateka
- Muhsin Yaşar (born 1995), Turkish basketball player
- Necdet Yaşar (1930–2017), Turkish tanbur (lute) player and teacher
- Nurettin Yaşar (born 1961), Turkish politician and member of Parliament
- Osman Yaşar, American computer scientist
- Özcan Yaşar (born 2002), Turkish footballer
- Selim Yaşar (born 1990), Ingushetia-born Russian and Turkish wrestler
- Seyfettin Anıl Yaşar (born 2002), Turkish footballer

=== Yasar ===
- Farrukh Yasar (1441–1500), Iranian monarch
- Farrukh Yasar II, 16th-century Iranian monarch
- Mehmet Yasar, 19th-century Ottoman governor
- Nedim Yasar (1987–2018), Danish former gangster and radio host of Turkish origin
- Özgür Yasar (born 1981), Swedish footballer
- Ursal Yasar (born 1980), Swiss footballer and manager

== See also ==
- Yashar (disambiguation)
- Yaşar, Karkamış, village in Gaziantep Province, Turkey
