= Igor Lazić =

Igor Lazić may refer to:

- Igor Lazić (footballer born 1967) (born 1967), Bosnian footballer
- Igor Lazić, birth name of Niggor (born 1971), Montenegrin hip-hop artist

== See also ==
- Igor Lazič (born 1979), Slovenian footballer
