= Karkamış =

Municipality in Gaziantep District, Turkey

- District and municipality
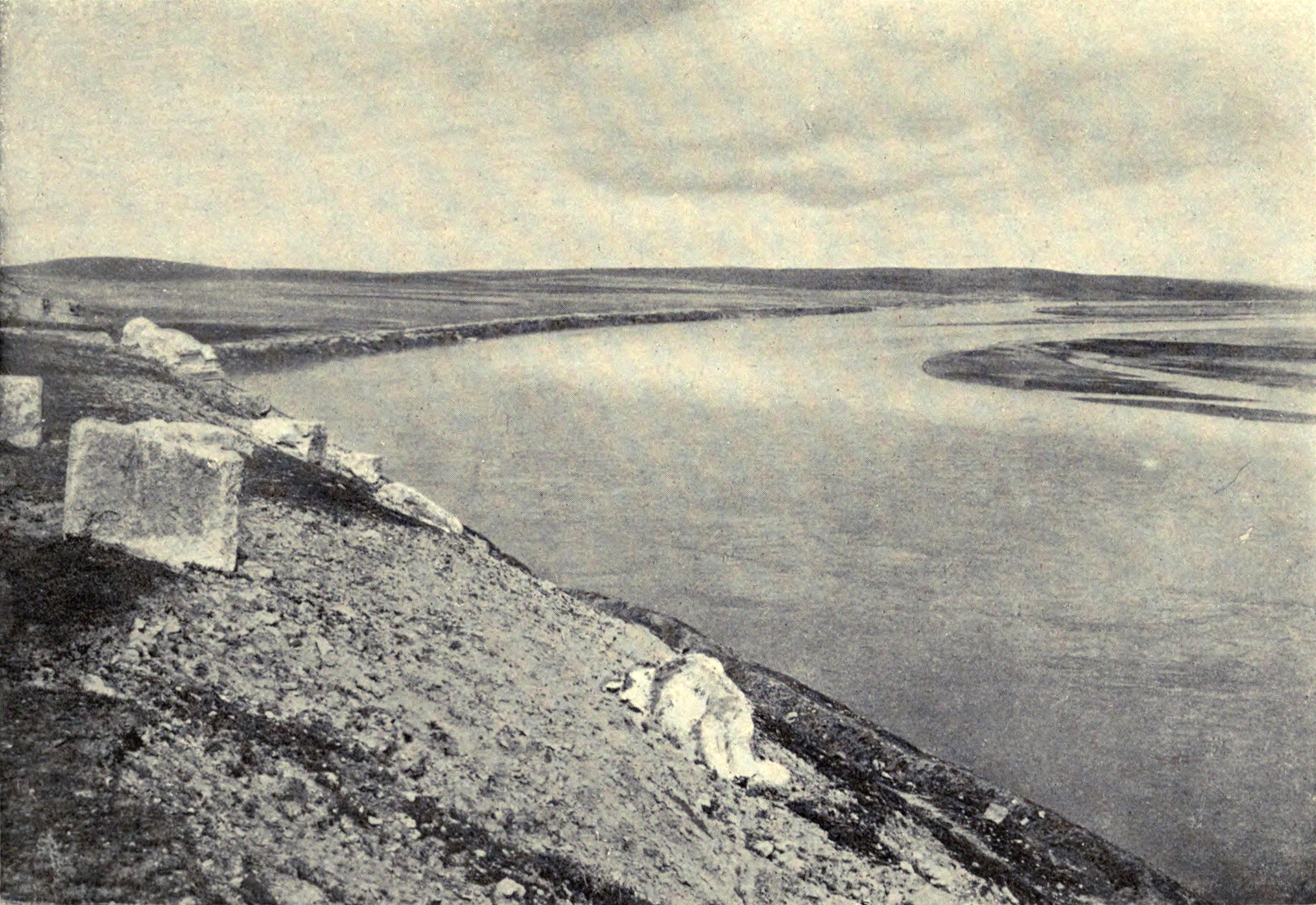
- Euphrates River from Karkamış, 1910

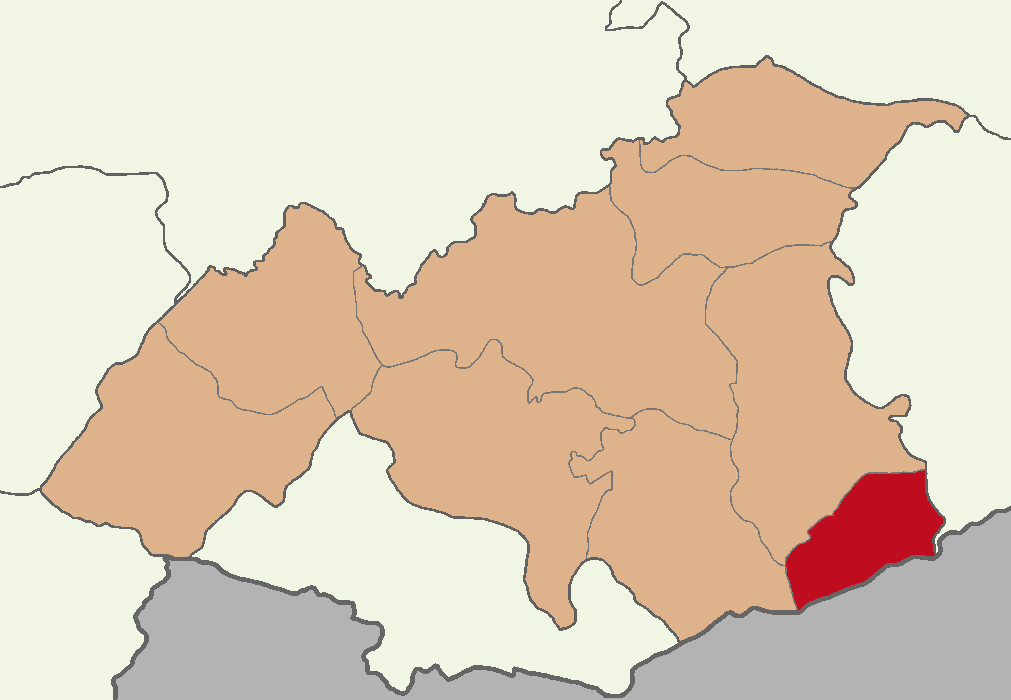
- Map showing Karkamış District in Gaziantep Province

- Location within Turkey
- Coordinates: 36°50′2″N 37°59′49″E
- Country: Turkey
- Province: Gaziantep

Government
  - Mayor: Mustafa Güzel (AK Party)
- Area: 298 km^{2} (115 sq mi)
- Population (2022): 9,379
  - Density: 31.5/km^{2} (81.5/sq mi)
- Time zone: UTC+3 (TRT)
- Postal code: 27880
- Area code: 0342
- Website: www.karkamis.bel.tr

Karkamış, formerly Carablus, is a municipality and district of Gaziantep Province, Turkey. Its area is 298 km^{2}, and its population is 9,379 (2022). It is next to the site of ancient Carchemish.

It is a border checkpoint on the road to Jarabulus in Syria.

== History ==
What is now the present-day town of Karkamış was essentially a constituent neighborhood of the town Jarabulus known as Şeyhavi. Upon the formation of the Syria–Turkey border, which followed the railroad running through the town, this neighborhood was isolated from the rest. The newly isolated settlement was initially renamed to Cerablus in 1928 after the main town, Barak in 1946 after a local Turkmen tribe found in the region, and lastly Karkamış after the ancient town Carchemish.

== Geography ==
The Euphrates runs east of Karkamış southward into Syria. At this place, a railway bridge of 870 m (2,850 ft) that was built between 1911 and 1913 by German engineers as part of the Istanbul-Baghdad Railway, crosses the river parallel to the border line.

One of the 21 dams of the Southeastern Anatolia Project (GAP), the Karkamış Dam and hydroelectric power station is located 4.5 km (2.8 mi) upstream from the border crossing of Euphrates.

== Composition ==
There are 39 neighbourhoods in Karkamış District:

- Akçaköy
- Alaçalı
- Alagöz
- Arıkdere
- Ayyıldız
- Balaban
- Beşkılıç
- Çarşı
- Çiftlik
- Eceler
- Elifoğlu
- Erenyolu
- Etiler
- Gürçay
- Karacurun
- Karanfil
- Karşıyaka
- Kelekli
- Kepirler
- Kıvırcık
- Korkmazlar
- Kuruyazı
- Lojmanlar
- Öncüler
- Örmetaş
- Savaş
- Şenlik
- Soylu
- Subağı
- Teketaşı
- Tosunlu
- Türkyurdu
- Yarımca
- Yaşar
- Yazır
- Yeşerti
- Yolağzı
- Yurtbağı
- Zührecik

== Demographics ==
The district is mostly populated by Turkmens from the Barak tribe, which inhabits all villages in the district while sharing some with other groups. Arabs are also found in the town of Karkamış and two villages.

== Archeology ==
In March 2011, the Turkish military base which included the ruins of Karkemish was cleared of mines. Archaeologists from Italy and Turkey began excavations, still ongoing, in the ancient town in September 2011.

The ancient site of Karkemish is now an extensive set of ruins, located on the West bank of Euphrates River, about 60 kilometres (37 mi) south-east of Gaziantep, Turkey and 100 kilometres (62 mi) northeast of Aleppo, Syria. The site is crossed by the Syria–Turkey border. A Turkish military base has been built after 1920 on the Karkemish acropolis and Inner Town, and access to the acropolis is still restricted. Most of the Outer Town lies in Syrian territory.

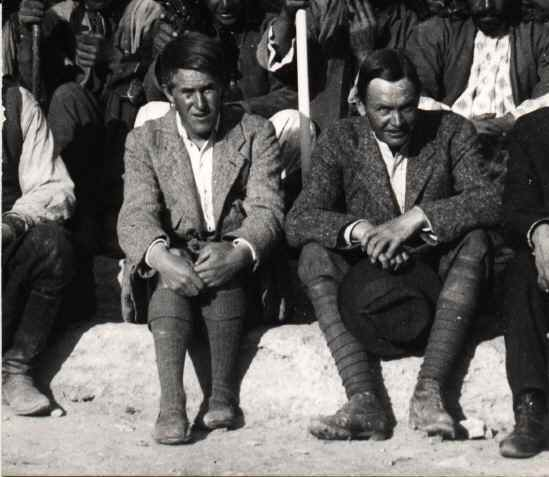
T.E. Lawrence and Leonard Woolley (right) in Karkemish, Spring 1913

Karkemish has always been well known to scholars because of several references to it in the Bible (Jer. 46:2; 2 Chr. 35:20; Isa. 10:9) and in Egyptian and Assyrian texts. However, its location was identified only in 1876 by George Smith.

The site was excavated by the British Museum, 1878–1881 by Patrick Henderson, 1911 by D. G. Hogarth and R. C. Thompson, and from 1912 to 1914 by C. L. Woolley, and T. E. Lawrence ("Lawrence of Arabia"). Excavations were interrupted in 1914 by World War I, resumed in 1920 with Woolley and then ended with the Turkish War of Independence. These expeditions uncovered substantial remains of the Neo-Hittite and Neo-Assyrian periods, including defensive structures, temples, palaces, and numerous basalt statues and reliefs with Luwian hieroglyphic inscriptions.

Following the completion in March 2011 of mine clearing operations on the Turkish portion of the site, archaeological work was resumed in September 2011 by a Turco-Italian joint archaeological expedition under the direction of Prof. Nicolò Marchetti of the University of Bologna.

== Border Crossing ==
Karkamış is the site of one of the 11 formal border crossing points between Turkey and Syria, connecting the Turkish town of Karkamış to the Syrian town of Jarablus, signifying the only Border Gate in the province of Gaziantep. Karkamış-Jarablus Border Gate is currently operational between 7:00 and 19:00 everyday including weekends and used by Turkish and Syrian nationals. The border gate has a smaller capacity compared to Öncüpınar and Cilvegözü border gates and thus lacks the truck traffic present at those gates, only offering a crossing by foot. As of Summer 2025, it is closed to visits into Syria by land to 3rd country nationals like all land borders with Syria. The border gate is surrounded by the Turkish-Syria Border Wall from both sides. Before the end of Syrian Civil War, in 2022, the border site was also targeted by mortar shells by military elements Northern Syria, resulting in the injury of Turkish soldiers and the death of a teacher in the adjacent primary school.
