= Yarımca, Karkamış =

Village in Gaziantep Province, Turkey

Yarımca
- Neighbourhood
- Location in Turkey
- Coordinates: 36°50′23″N 37°59′16″E
- Country: Turkey
- Province: Gaziantep
- District: Karkamış
- Population (2022): 61
- Time zone: UTC+3 (TRT)

Yarımca is a neighbourhood in the municipality and district of Karkamış, Gaziantep Province, Turkey. The village had a population of 61 in 2022 and is inhabited by Turkmens of the Barak tribe.
