= Kıvırcık, Karkamış =

Village in Gaziantep Province, Turkey

Kıvırcık
- Neighbourhood
- Location in Turkey
- Coordinates: 36°49′55″N 37°56′56″E
- Country: Turkey
- Province: Gaziantep
- District: Karkamış
- Population (2022): 235
- Time zone: UTC+3 (TRT)

Kıvırcık is a neighbourhood in the municipality and district of Karkamış, Gaziantep Province, Turkey. The village had a population of 235 in 2022 and is inhabited by Turkmens of the Barak tribe.
