= Elvedin Varupa =

Bosnian footballer

Personal information
- Full name: Elvedin Varupa
- Date of birth: 16 November 1975
- Place of birth: Vitez, SFR Yugoslavia
- Date of death: 1 August 2015 (aged 39)
- Place of death: Vitez, Bosnia and Herzegovina
- Height: 1.82 m (5 ft 11 1/2 in)
- Position: Left-back

Youth career
- Vitez
- Sarajevo
- –1994: Varteks Varaždin

Senior career*
| Years | Team | Apps | (Gls) |
| 1994–1995 | Suhopolje | 21 | (3) |
| 1995–1996 | Garić Garešnica | 25 | (2) |
| 1996–2014 | Travnik | 432 | (29) |
| Total | | 478 | (34) |

Managerial career
- 2014–2015: Travnik (youth)
- * Club domestic league appearances and goals

Elvedin Varupa (16 November 1975 – 1 August 2015) was a Bosnian professional footballer who played as a left-back.

== Club career ==
He played in over 400 league games and in about 700 games in all competitions for Travnik, whose captain he was from 2004 to 2014. Varupa is regarded as a legend of the Bosnian Premier League.

After finishing his playing career, he held the position of coach in the youth team of Travnik from 2014 until his sudden death on 1 August 2015.

== Personal life ==
He was the younger brother of former FK Sarajevo player Vejsil Varupa.

=== Death ===
Varupa died suddenly on 1 August 2015 in his hometown of Vitez, Bosnia and Herzegovina at the age of 39. He was buried at the "Grbavica" Cemetery near Vitez on 2 August 2015, one day after his death.

== Honours ==
=== Player ===
Travnik

- First League of FBiH: 2002–03, 2006–07
