= Arıkdere, Karkamış =

Village in Gaziantep Province, Turkey

Arıkdere
- Neighbourhood
- Location in Turkey
- Coordinates: 36.819°N 37.840°E
- Country: Turkey
- Province: Gaziantep
- District: Karkamış
- Population (2022): 265
- Time zone: UTC+3 (TRT)

Arıkdere, also known as Germiş, is a neighbourhood in the municipality and district of Karkamış, Gaziantep Province, Turkey. The village had a population of 265 in 2022 and is inhabited by Turkmens of the Barak tribe.
