= Kepirler, Karkamış =

Village in Gaziantep Province, Turkey

Kepirler
- Neighbourhood
- Location in Turkey
- Coordinates: 36°55′42″N 37°57′31″E
- Country: Turkey
- Province: Gaziantep
- District: Karkamış
- Population (2022): 46
- Time zone: UTC+3 (TRT)

Kepirler, formerly Karahamut, is a neighbourhood in the municipality and district of Karkamış, Gaziantep Province, Turkey. The village had a population of 46 and is inhabited by Turkmens of the Barak tribe.
