= Çiftlik, Karkamış =

Village in Gaziantep Province, Turkey

Çiftlik
- Neighbourhood
- Location in Turkey
- Coordinates: 36.827°N 37.796°E
- Country: Turkey
- Province: Gaziantep
- District: Karkamış
- Population (2022): 551
- Time zone: UTC+3 (TRT)

Çiftlik is a neighbourhood in the municipality and district of Karkamış, Gaziantep Province, Turkey. The village had a population of 551 in 2022 and is inhabited by Turkmens of the Barak and Elbegli tribes.
