= Karanfil, Karkamış =

Village in Gaziantep Province, Turkey

Karanfil
- Neighbourhood
- Location in Turkey
- Coordinates: 36°49′47″N 37°58′23″E
- Country: Turkey
- Province: Gaziantep
- District: Karkamış
- Population (2022): 165
- Time zone: UTC+3 (TRT)

Karanfil, formerly and still informally called Çakıroğlu, is a neighbourhood in the municipality and district of Karkamış, Gaziantep Province, Turkey. The village had a population of 165 in 2022. It is inhabited by Turkmens of the Barak tribe.
