= Öncüler, Karkamış =

Village in Gaziantep Province, Turkey

Öncüler
- Neighbourhood
- Location within Turkey
- Coordinates: 36°46′45″N 37°51′3″E
- Country: Turkey
- Province: Gaziantep
- District: Karkamış
- Population (2022): 163
- Time zone: UTC+3 (TRT)

Öncüler, formerly and still informally called Hülmen, is a neighbourhood in the municipality and district of Karkamış, Gaziantep Province, Turkey. The village had a population of 163 in 2022 and is inhabited by Turkmens of the Barak tribe.
