= Kuruyazı, Karkamış =

Village in Gaziantep Province, Turkey

Kuruyazı
- Neighbourhood
- Location in Turkey
- Coordinates: 36°51′55″N 37°48′57″E
- Country: Turkey
- Province: Gaziantep
- District: Karkamış
- Population (2022): 89
- Time zone: UTC+3 (TRT)

Kuruyazı, formerly and still informally called Hasanız, is a neighbourhood in the municipality and district of Karkamış, Gaziantep Province, Turkey. The village had a population of 89 in 2022 and is inhabited by Turkmens of the Barak tribe.
