= Ayyıldız, Karkamış =

Village in Gaziantep Province, Turkey

Ayyıldız
- Neighbourhood
- Location in Turkey
- Coordinates: 36.793°N 37.768°E
- Country: Turkey
- Province: Gaziantep
- District: Karkamış
- Population (2022): 108
- Time zone: UTC+3 (TRT)

Ayyıldız, also known as Noho, is a neighbourhood in the municipality and district of Karkamış, Gaziantep Province, Turkey. The village had a population of 108 in 2022. It is inhabited by Turkmens of the Barak tribe.
