= Alaçalı, Karkamış =

Village in Gaziantep Province, Turkey

Alaçalı
- Neighbourhood
- Location in Turkey
- Coordinates: 36.830°N 37.771°E
- Country: Turkey
- Province: Gaziantep
- District: Karkamış
- Population (2022): 247
- Time zone: UTC+3 (TRT)

Alaçalı, also known as Kılcan, is a neighbourhood in the municipality and district of Karkamış, Gaziantep Province, Turkey. The village is inhabited by Turkmens of the Barak tribe and had a population of 247 in 2022.
