= Yurtbağı, Karkamış =

Village in Gaziantep Province, Turkey

Yurtbağı
- Neighbourhood
- Location in Turkey
- Coordinates: 36°51′42″N 38°0′17″E
- Country: Turkey
- Province: Gaziantep
- District: Karkamış
- Population (2022): 163
- Time zone: UTC+3 (TRT)

Yurtbağı, formerly and still informally called Merchamis, is a neighbourhood in the municipality and district of Karkamış, Gaziantep Province, Turkey. The village is inhabited by Turkmens of the Barak tribe and had a population of 163 in 2022.
