= Balaban, Karkamış =

Village in Gaziantep Province, Turkey

Balaban
- Neighbourhood
- Location in Turkey
- Coordinates: 36.812°N 37.769°E
- Country: Turkey
- Province: Gaziantep
- District: Karkamış
- Population (2022): 49
- Time zone: UTC+3 (TRT)

Balaban, also known as Seydümen, is a neighbourhood in the municipality and district of Karkamış, Gaziantep Province, Turkey. The village had a population of 49 in 2022 and is inhabited by Turkmens of the Barak tribe.
