= Şenlik, Karkamış =

Village in Gaziantep Province, Turkey

Şenlik
- Neighbourhood
- Location within Turkey
- Coordinates: 36°49′37″N 37°49′12″E
- Country: Turkey
- Province: Gaziantep
- District: Karkamış
- Population (2022): 22
- Time zone: UTC+3 (TRT)

Şenlik is a neighbourhood in the municipality and district of Karkamış, Gaziantep Province, Turkey. The village had a population of 22 in 2022 and is inhabited by Turkmens of the Barak tribe.
