= Elifoğlu, Karkamış =

Village in Gaziantep Province, Turkey

Elifoğlu
- Neighbourhood
- Location in Turkey
- Coordinates: 36°56′49″N 37°59′20″E
- Country: Turkey
- Province: Gaziantep
- District: Karkamış
- Population (2022): 560
- Time zone: UTC+3 (TRT)

Elifoğlu is a neighbourhood in the municipality and district of Karkamış, Gaziantep Province, Turkey. The village had a population of 560 in 2022 and is inhabited by Turkmens of the Barak tribe.
