= Erenyolu, Karkamış =

Village in Gaziantep Province, Turkey

Erenyolu
- Neighbourhood
- Location in Turkey
- Coordinates: 36°52′24″N 37°58′27″E
- Country: Turkey
- Province: Gaziantep
- District: Karkamış
- Population (2022): 105
- Time zone: UTC+3 (TRT)

Erenyolu, formerly and still informally called Tilhabeş (lit. 'Ethiopian tell'), is a neighbourhood in the municipality and district of Karkamış, Gaziantep Province, Turkey. The village had a population of 105 in 2022 and is inhabited by Turkmens of the Barak tribe.
