= Yeşerti, Karkamış =

Village in Gaziantep Province, Turkey

Yeşerti
- Neighbourhood
- Location in Turkey
- Coordinates: 36°51′11″N 37°50′42″E
- Country: Turkey
- Province: Gaziantep
- District: Karkamış
- Population (2022): 334
- Time zone: UTC+3 (TRT)

Yeşerti, formerly and still informally called Kefrik, is a neighbourhood in the municipality and district of Karkamış, Gaziantep Province, Turkey. The village had a population of 334 in 2022 and is inhabited by Turkmens of the Barak tribe.
