= Eceler, Karkamış =

Village in Gaziantep Province, Turkey

Eceler
- Neighbourhood
- Location in Turkey
- Coordinates: 36.916°N 37.924°E
- Country: Turkey
- Province: Gaziantep
- District: Karkamış
- Population (2022): 244
- Time zone: UTC+3 (TRT)

Eceler, also known as Melikâ, is a neighbourhood in the municipality and district of Karkamış, Gaziantep Province, Turkey. The village had a population of 244 in 2022 and is inhabited by Turkmens of the Barak tribe.
