= Ragip Jashari =

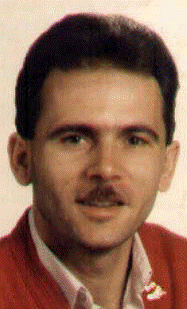
Ragip Jashari

Ragip Jashari (Serbo-Croat: Ragip Jašari; November 11, 1961 – April 19, 1999), was an Albanian politician and activist.

== Early life and political activities ==
Ragip Jashari was born in a village in the municipality of Lipljan, FPR Yugoslavia. He was an activist for the independence of Kosovo for which he was persecuted by the Yugoslav government. As president of the youth in Lipljan in 1988–1989, he objected the constitution of 1974 by supporting the 1989 Kosovo miners' strike in Kosovska Mitrovica. This was a political step to favour the promptness of Kosovo's youth for independence of the land.

This act was the cause for many political changes in the Lipljan government causing Jashari to leave Kosovo and seek political asylum in Germany. During his time in Germany, the Yugoslav secret police twice tried to assassinate him.

In March 1998, he left Germany and returned to Kosovo where the war against FR Yugoslavia had started.

After his return on April 19, 1999, he was executed by Serbian forces in his birthplace, Mali Alas. On the same day, his home was burnt along with all his manuscripts, novels, poetry and documents.
