= Yashar LaChayal =

Israeli non-profit organization supporting IDF soldiers

- ישר לחייל
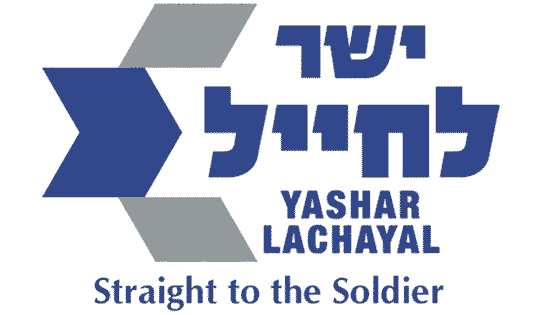
- Yashar LaChayal logo
- Formation: 2006; 20 years ago
- Purpose: Providing support and supplies to Israel Defense Forces soldiers
- Executive Director: Leon Blankrot

Yashar LaChayal (Hebrew: ישר לחייל) ("Straight to the Soldier") is an Israeli non-profit organization established in 2006 that provides soldiers of the Israel Defense Forces with toiletries, relaxation corners, warm jackets, free food and beverages and other creature comforts.

== History ==
During the Second Lebanon War in 2006, a group of volunteers drove hygienic supplies to soldiers stationed on the northern border of Israel. Dubbing the project "Operation Northern Points," they decided to continue their work after the war by founding the Yashar LaChayal organization. The organization's overhead expenses are paid for by a philanthropist.

The name of the organization, Hebrew for "straight to the soldier," alludes to the fact that donations go towards the humanitarian needs of Israeli soldiers and not the organization's overhead costs. The executive director of the organization is Leon Blankrot, co-founder of Volunteers for Israel, which sends groups of Americans to volunteer on army bases around Israel.

Yashar LaChayal's operating expenses are paid for by philanthropists. Beyond that, the aid provided by Yashar LaChayal to Israel's soldiers is funded by individual donors.

== Projects ==
The "Warm Corner – Pina Chama" project is a network of cabins near IDF patrol routes where soldiers can stop to rest, and have coffee and a snack.

== Services ==
- Providing non-military equipment for I.D.F. soldiers beyond what the army itself provides.
- Support for "lone soldiers" (soldiers who immigrated, are orphans, or for other reasons have no family support) and injured soldiers
- Support for soldiers from needy families.
- Support for minorities serving in the I.D.F.

== See also ==
- Charitable organizations
