= Anto Jakovljević =

Bosnian-Herzegovinian footballer (1962–2025)

Personal information
- Date of birth: 25 September 1962
- Place of birth: Banja Luka, PR Bosnia and Herzegovina, FPR Yugoslavia
- Date of death: 20 October 2025 (aged 63)
- Position: Goalkeeper

Youth career
- Borac Banja Luka

Senior career*
Years	Team	Apps	(Gls)
1981–1991	Borac Banja Luka		
1991–1992	FK Sarajevo	25	(0)
1992	Pazinka	6	(0)
1992	Mura	5	(0)
1993	NK Ljubljana	23	(0)
1994–1996	Hrvatski Dragovoljac		(0)
1996–1997	NK Mladost 127	28	(0)
- * Club domestic league appearances and goals

Anto Jakovljević (25 September 1962 – 20 October 2025) was a Bosnian-Herzegovinian footballer who played as a goalkeeper.

== Career ==
Jakovljević played for Borac Banja Luka and FK Sarajevo in the Yugoslav First League. Later he played for some lower-league clubs in Slovenia and Croatia.

His first name has also been spelled Anton and Ante.

== Death ==
Jakovljević died on 20 October 2025, at the age of 63.
