= Karkamış Bridge =

Karkamış Bridge Karkamış Köprüsü
- Coordinates: 36.8301°N 38.0246°E
- Carries: 1 track of the Baghdad railway
- Crosses: Euphrates
- Locale: Karkamış, Gaziantep Province and Çiçekalan, Şanlıurfa Province
- Named for: Karkamış
- Owner: Turkish State Railways

Characteristics
- Material: Steel
- Total length: 870 m (2,850 ft)
- No. of spans: 10

History
- Designer: Holzmann & Co.
- Constructed by: CIOB
- Construction start: 1911
- Construction end: 1913; 113 years ago
- Inaugurated: 11 July 1914

Location
- Interactive map of Karkamış Bridge

The Karkamış Bridge (Turkish: Karkamış Köprüsü) is a Parker-truss bridge carrying the Baghdad Railway across the Euphrates in southeastern Turkey.

The bridge was built by the Baghdad Railway between 1911 and 1913 in the Ottoman Empire and played an important role for transporting troops and supplies during World War I, as it was the only permanent crossing of the Euphrates in the area. After the war, the bridge and the railway fell under British military control until the Allies withdrew their forces from Turkey. The French-owned Chemins de fer de Cilicie Nord-Syrie, headquartered in French Syria (CNS) took over the railway in 1921 and operated the route until being sold to the Turkish-owned Southern Railway in 1933. This new company owned and operated the railway until being absorbed by the Turkish State Railways in 1948.

When first completed, the structure was the second longest bridge in the Ottoman Empire and later Turkey, after Uzunköprü Bridge in East Thrace.
