= Qerkh Yashar =

Qerkh Yashar قرخ ياشار
- Village
- Location within Iran
- Coordinates: 38°37′09″N 44°53′39″E
- Country: Iran
- Province: West Azerbaijan
- County: Khoy
- Bakhsh: Central
- Rural District: Dizaj

Population (2006)
  - Total: 233
- Time zone: UTC+3:30 (IRST)
  - Summer (DST): UTC+4:30 (IRDT)

Qerkh Yashar (Persian: قرخ ياشار, also Romanized as Qerkh Yāshār) is a village in Dizaj Rural District, in the Central District of Khoy County, West Azerbaijan Province, Iran. At the 2006 census, its population was 233, in 47 families.
