= Yaşar Önel =

Turkish-born physicist

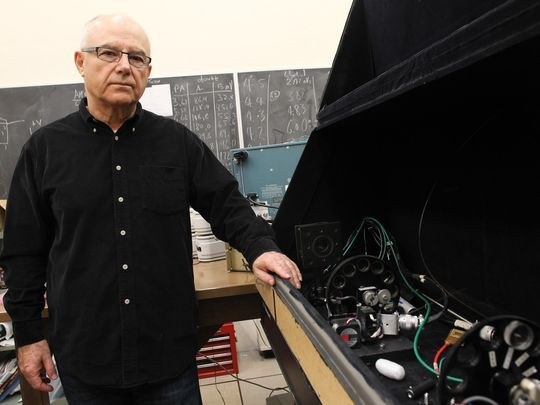
Professor Yaşar Önel is at one of his labs at the University of Iowa

Yaşar Önel is a Turkish-born physicist who holds Swiss and American citizenship. He received his Ph.D. in Physics from London University in 1975. He worked at the Queen Mary University of London in the United Kingdom, and Neuchatel and Geneva Universities in Switzerland before joining the University of Texas at Austin in 1986. Then, he moved to the University of Iowa in 1988. He is a tenured faculty professor. of Physics at the University of Iowa in Iowa City, IA, USA.

He is an experimental high energy physicist who has expertise in building particle physics detectors for which he has five invention disclosures. His focus is on photodetectors, optical systems, and calibrations systems used in large scale experiments. He has been a part of a number of high energy particle physics collaborations including: FERMILAB Experiment E683 (deputy spokesman), Fermilab Experiment E863 (co-spokesman), Fermilab Experiments E704, E781 and E907, SPRIT Collaboration at Brookhaven National Laboratory (spokesman), GEM Collaboration at SSC, Spinsplitter Collaboration at IUCF (co-spokesman), SING Collaboration at CERN LEAR, CALICE Collaboration, LHC-CMS Collaboration and FCC Collaboration. He has been the US coordinator and the upgrade project manager of Forward Calorimetry of the CMS at LHC for many years. He is funded by the US Department of Energy (DOE) and previously had grants from the US NSF and NATO. He has acquired about $25 million in total from grant funding for his research activities so far.

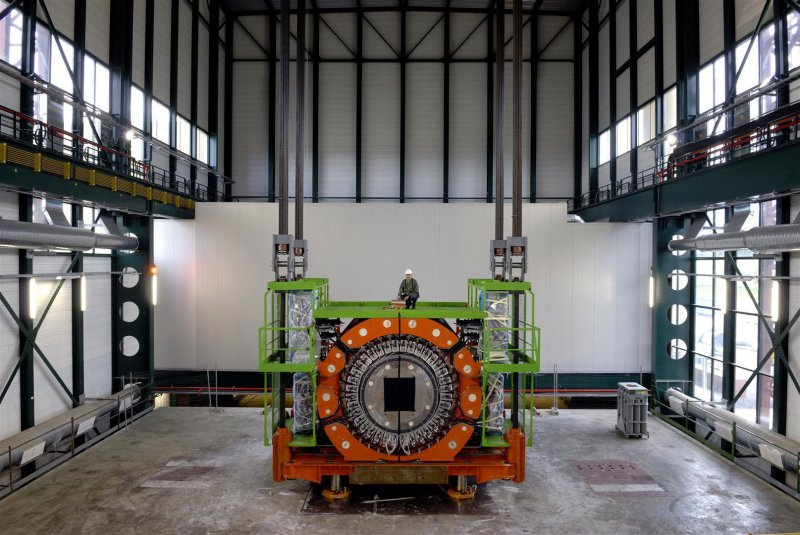
The Hadronic Forward Calorimeter of the CMS at LHC before it is lowered into the experimental cavern

Onel has more than 900 publications in peer-reviewed journals and is the co-author of two books; Trends in Collider Spin Physics, and Spin and Polarization Dynamics in Nuclear & Particle Physics. He has been James Van Allen Natural Sciences Fellow since 1998 and American Physical Society (APS) Fellow since 2008

He has supervised more than 15 Ph.D. students at the UI since 1988. Most of them are working at different universities in the US and abroad as a faculty and some of them are working in the private sector, running R&D departments or running their own companies. He has been serving in the NSF&CMS Education and Outreach Committee for a number of years and he is an Iowa team mentor of the QuarkNet project at Fermilab.
