= Yaşar (singer) =

Turkish musical artist (born 1970)

- Born: Murat Yaşar Günaçgün; 5 April 1970 (age 55); Adana, Turkey
- Genres: Turkish pop
- Occupations: Singer, poet
- Instruments: Vocals, guitar
- Years active: 1990–present
- Labels: Topkapı (1996–2007); Lirik (1996–2000); Tempo (1998–2000); Seyhan (2007–)

Murat Yaşar Günaçgün (born 5 April 1970), known by the mononym Yaşar, is a Turkish pop music artist.

== Life and career ==
Murat Yaşar Günaçgün was born to Mustafa Erdal and Mukaddes Leyla Günaçgün. His family originates from Çukurova. He attended Adana İsmet İnönü Primary School and later enrolled in Adana Special New High School (New College). While at high school, he was part of the school orchestra. He first performed on stage in November 1985 on Teachers' Day. In 1987, he moved to Istanbul and enrolled in Marmara University's business school. While studying, he continued to perform at various venues, including Moda Han Bar. In addition to performing, he started writing poems during this period. In 1991, he formed a small band with whom he took the stage in Mersin. After graduating from Marmara University, he received his master's degree in international finance from Istanbul University.

His first studio album, titled Divane was released in September 1996. Divane was awarded a gold certification. In 1997, Yaşar received the Best Debut by a Male Artist at the Kral TV Video Music Awards. This was followed by Esirinim in 1998 and Masal in 2001. In July 2002, he went on a nationwide tour under the title "Masal Konserleri". In January 2003, he released the album Sevdiğim Şarkılar, followed by Hatırla in May 2005. Several songs from the album Sevda Sinemalarda, which was released in 2006, entered Turkey's official music chart.

On 28 May 2011, Yaşar married Merve Oğuz with whom he has a son named Kerim.

== Discography ==
=== Albums, singles and EPs ===
- Divane (1996)
- Divane Remixes (1997)
- Esirinim (29 October 1998/1999)
- Masal (2001)
- Masal Remixes (2002)
- Sevdiğim Şarkılar (2003)
- Sevdiğim Şarkılar Remixes (2003)
- Hatırla (2005)
- Sevda Sinemalarda (2006)
- Dem (2008)
- Gençlik Marşı (single) (2008)
- Eski Yazlar (2010)
- Eski Yazlar – Revised (2011)
- Cadde (2013)
- Şehir Yalnızlığı (2017)
- Küller Alevlenmeye Başladı/Camları Tükenmez Pencerelerin (single) (2021)
- İhanet Ettin (single) (2022)
- Deniz Şarkıları (2024)

=== As featured artist/contributor ===
- Onur Mete – Bitmesin – "İltifat Et" (lyrics-music-vocals) (1997)
- Richard Clayderman – Turquie Mon Amour (Aşkım Türkiye) – "Divane" (Instrumantal) (1998)
- Bülent Ortaçgil – Karma – "Bu İş Zor Yonca" (vocals) (2000)
- Bengü – Hoş Geldin – "Hep Yanındayım" (music) (2000)
- Yeşim Salkım – Hep Böyle Kal – "Selam Aleyküm" (duet) (2000)
- Devlerin Aşkı TV series soundtrack – "Gel Benimle" (2000)
- Yeşim Vatan – "Ay Benim Aklım" (single) (lysics-music) (2000)
- Melih Kibar – Yadigâr – "İşte Öyle Bir Şey" (vocals) (2001)
- Nilüfer – Büyük Aşkım – "Ölmek Var Dönmek Yok" (lyrics-music) (2001)
- Arto – Emrin Olur – "Neydi Ki Derdin" (duet) (2003)
- Soner Arıca – Aşkla Oldu Best Of – "Beni Bırakma" (duet) (2003)
- Aynı Mahallenin Çocukları – "Ara Beni Yar"/"Divane"/"Akdeniz Akşamları" (vocals) (2004)
- Yeşim Vatan – "Beni Arayabilir Misin?" (lyrics-music; producer) (2004)
- Türkiyeli Noel Baba – Karma – "Umut Dolu Tebessüm" (vocals) (2004)
- Ezginin Günlüğü – Çeyrek – "Ebruli" (vocals) (2007)
- Ayla Dikmen – Seninle Sonsuza Kadar – "İlk ve Son Aşkım Sen Olacaksın" (duet) (2007)
- Ercan Özaksoy – Hüthüt – "To Dede" (vocals) (2008)
- "Gel Sen de Katıl Umudun Şarkısına" (vocals) (2008)
- Çocuk soundtrack – "Dondurma Şeker" (vocals) (2008)
- Teoman – Söz Müzik Teoman – "Rüzgâr Gülü" (vocals) (2008)
- Ömer Bayramoğlu – Biz Önemliyiz – "Adı Sevdadır"/"Yeniden" (duet/vocals) (2008)
- Yıldız Usmanova – Dünya – "Seni Severdim" (duet) (2009)
- Emir Ersoy – Projecto Cubano – "Masal" (vocals) (2010)
- Uzun Yol Türküleri 2 – Karma – "Az Bana Gönder" (vocals) (2011)
- Koz – Beklemeye Devam – "Kör Bıçak" (duet-poem) (2012)
- Kürşat Başar – Keşke Burada Olsaydın – "Kimse Bilmez" (vocals) (2012)
- Orhan Gencebay ile Bir Ömür – "Yorgun Gözler" (vocals) (2012)
- "Minigon" – English Teaching Series for Preschool Children (2012)
- Emir Ersoy – Karnaval – "Maskeli Balo" (vocals) (2013)
- Onur Akın – Onurlu 25 Yıl – "Firari" (vocals) (2013)
- Ayça Varlıer – Elif – "Beni Benimle Bırak" (duet) (2013)
- Aysel'in – "Yine Yeni Yeniden" (vocals) (2013)
- Ayhan Günyıl – Rengarenk – "Gitme Sana Muhtacım" (vocals) (2013)
- Tavşan Görenkulak – Social Responsibility Project-Audio Tales (2013)
- Seyfi Yerlikaya – Sen Gidince – "Beni Koyup Gitme" (music) (2014)
- Eda-Metin Özülkü – Bizim Şarkılar – "Sen Daha Dur" (vocals) (2015)
- Yıldız Usmanova – Hayat Bana Aşk Borcun Var – "Vur Vur" (duet) (2015)
- Cüneyt Tek – "Gel Gel" (duet) (2016)
- Ebru Cündübeyoğlu – "Kalbimin Efendisi" (duet) (2016)
- Harun Kolçak – Çeyrek Asır – "Hak Etmedim Ayrılığı" (duet) (2016)
- Zülfü Livaneli – Bir Kuşaktan Bir Kuşağa "50. Sanat Yılı Saygı Albümü" – "Gün Olur" (vocals) (2016)
- Ahmet Selçuk İlkan – Ahmet Selçuk İlkan Unutulmayan Şarkılar, Vol. 2 – "Ya Seninle Ya Sensiz" (vocals) (2018)
- Tolga Futacı – Yol Ayrımı – "İltifat Et" (lyrics-music) (2020)
- Melih Kibar – MESAJ – Melih Kibar Saygı Albümü – "Söyle Canım" (vocals) (2020)
- Daniska – Keşke Meyhanesi – "Peki Ya Şimdi?" (duet) (2021)
- İzmir Türküleri – Harmandalı – (vocals) (2022)
- Var Mı? (Barbaros Büyükakkan ile Düet) (Single) (2022)
- Bora Öztoprak – 30. Yıl – "Akdeniz Geceleri" (Düet) (2023)
- Seda Akay – Söz ve Seda Akay Vol.1 – "Deli Mavi" (Karma Sanatçılarla Yorum) (2023)
- İbrahim Erkal – Hürmet (3. albüm) – Dönemem (Yorum) (2023)
- Ayşen – Nerdesin – Tekli (Düet) (2024)
- Barış Kömürcüoğlu – Sebepsiz Fırtına (cover; Söz-Müzik) (2025)
- Kaan Öztürk (e.e. Yaşar) – Bu Gece İstanbul'da (2025)
- Suat Suna - Hayata Dokunan Şarkılar (Düet albüm) – Son Bir Defa (Düet) (2025)
- Söz ve Seda Akay Vol. 2 - Seda Akay Saygı Albümü – Sebebim (Yorum) (2025)

== Charts ==
Album	Single	Peak
Album	Single	TR
Sevda Sinemalarda	"Hayırdır İnşallah"	1
Sevda Sinemalarda	"Sevda Sinemalarda"	3
Sevda Sinemalarda	"Başımda Sevdan"	20
Sevda Sinemalarda	"Kayıkçı"	—
Sevda Sinemalarda	"Şarkı Halinde Kal"	17
Çeyrek	"Ebruli"	10
Dem	"Cezayir Menekşesi"	7

== Books ==
- Yalnızlık Dört Bin Perde, August 2003, (Şiir kitabı)
- Kuş Ökseleri, Poetry book, Prepared by: Kadri Karahan, January 2013
- Gelen Yolcu, Story book, Writer: Sıtkı Silah, voiceover for the section 'Artısı', 2013

== Authored articles ==
- Kral magazine, Nezleli Karga (24 January 2007 – 9 May 2007), weekly articles
- Kral magazine, Otomatik Portakal (30 May 2007 – 11 July 2007), weekly articles
- KAFA magazine, October 2014, Issue: 2, Back Cover writing
- KAFA magazine, December 2014, Issue: 4, Title: An Gelir...
- KAFA magazine, February 2015, Issue: 6, Title: f.r.i.e.n.d.s
- KAFA magazine, March 2015, Issue: 7, Title: nia nia
- KAFA magazine, May 2015, Issue: 9, Title: Müzisyen olmasaydım ne olurdum
- BAVUL magazine, August 2016, Issue: 11, Tittle: Arkadaşım, Yoldaşım, Dedem: Attilâ İlhan
- KAFA magazine, May 2021, Musicians Special Issue: Periwinkle

== Radio programs ==
- Neşeli Kargalar – Pal FM (together with Levent Erim) (2009)
- Her Dem Yaşar – TRT FM (2011–2012)

== Filmography ==
- 2000 – Ağlayan Kadın (Ali)
- 2001 – Kimse Beni Sevmiyor (Ruhi)
- 2008 – Benim Annem Bir Melek (Himself)
- 2010 – Yahşi Cazibe (Himself)
- 2014 – Arkadaşım Hoş Geldin (Guest artist – hotel customer)
- 2017 – Güldüy Güldüy Show Çocuk (guest appearance on episode 23)
- 2018 – Beş Mevsim (music video by Murat Güneş)

=== Commercials ===
- 2007 – Turkcell Support to the National Team (sesiyle)
- 2010 – Pakpen
- 2011 – Panda Ice Cream
- 2012 – Arçelik
- 2015 – Demirdöküm Kombi
- 2022 – Helis Serina Bodrum
