= Nedim Yasar =

Nedim Yasar (born in Turkey as Nedim Yaşar in 1987 - died in Copenhagen, Denmark, 20 November 2018) was a former Danish-Kurdish gang member, and later a radio host on the Danish talk station Radio24syv with the programme titled Police Radio. On 20 November 2018 he was murdered, and after a ceremony at the Alaadin Mosque in Albertslund was buried in a Muslim burial ground in Brøndby.

== Life ==
Yaşar was born in Turkey of Kurdish parents and immigrated when he was four years old with his family to Denmark. He grew up in the residential planned community area of Grantoften in Ballerup on Copenhagen West suburbs. He was expelled from school in sixth grade after threatening another student. He became part of the gang environment from the age of 15 until he was 25 and founded and headed the Danish motorcycle gang Los Guerreros, a support club of the Bandidos. He was imprisoned for extortion and violence. After serving a sentence in jail, he signed up for an exit program catered for gang members. After leaving his criminal life behind, Yaşar had become a mentor for troubled youths, and talked about his experiences.

== Murder and investigations ==
On 19 November 2018, Yasar was hit by gunshots while sitting in his car. He died the following day with Danish Police confirming that he had died succumbing to his wounds.

A book about Yaşar's life had been written and just released by his co-host Marie Louise Toksvig titles Rødder: En Gangsters Udvej (meaning Roots: A Gangster's Way Out). Yasar was shot when he was leaving the reception for the book launch.

In December 2018, three men were arrested and charged with his murder, with a fourth arrest following in January 2019.

In February 2020, 25 year old Alexander Findanis and 26 year old Martin Binni Svanberg were found guilty of the murder of Yasar, and both were sentenced to life in prison. In February 2021, Martin Binni Svanberg was acquitted when it was found that he had no part in the murder, and while he was a driver for Findanis, he did not know of any plans to murder Yaşar.
