= Dragoslav Vukadin =

Bosnian footballer

Personal information
- Date of birth: 19 February 1963 (age 63)
- Place of birth: Sarajevo, SR Bosnia and Herzegovina, SFR Yugoslavia
- Position: Goalkeeper

Senior career*
Years	Team	Apps	(Gls)
1981–1993	Sarajevo	25	(0)
1987	→ Jedinstvo Bihać (loan)	17	
1988	→ Jedinstvo Bihać (loan)	19	
1994–1995	SpVgg Edenkoben		
- * Club domestic league appearances and goals

Dragoslav Vukadin (born 19 February 1963) is a Bosnian former professional footballer who played as a goalkeeper, primarily for FK Sarajevo in the Yugoslav First League.

== Club career ==
Vukadin began his senior career with FK Sarajevo, making his Yugoslav First League debut on 10 September 1982 in a match against HNK Rijeka that ended in a 2–1 win for Sarajevo. He played as part of the Sarajevo squad between 1981 and 1993, recording 25 league appearances across several seasons, including 1982–83, 1986–87, 1988–89, and 1989–90.

During his time at Sarajevo, Vukadin had loan spells at Jedinstvo Bihać in 1987 and again in 1988.

After leaving Sarajevo, he played for German club SpVgg Edenkoben in the 1994–95 season.
