= Murat Jašarević =

Bosnian footballer

Personal information
- Full name: Murat Jašarević
- Date of birth: 18 March 1969 (age 57)
- Place of birth: Sarajevo, SFR Yugoslavia
- Height: 1.87 m (6 ft 2 in)
- Position: Defender

Senior career*
Years	Team	Apps	(Gls)
1987–1988	Goražde		
1988-1992	Sarajevo		
1992–1993	Pazinka	11	(0)
1993–1995	MSV Duisburg	17	(1)
1995-1996	Hannover 96	26	(1)
1996–1998	FSV Zwickau	33	(0)
1998–2000	Wuppertaler SV	46	(0)
2000-2003	Erzgebirge Aue	53	(1)
2003–2004	Germania Ratingen	17	(0)

International career^{‡}
1996-1997	Bosnia and Herzegovina	5	(0)
- * Club domestic league appearances and goals ‡ National team caps and goals as of 19 June 2021

Murat Jašarević (born 18 March 1969) is a Bosnian retired football player.

== Club career ==
After leaving Croatian top tier-side Pazinka Pazin he had spells with several clubs in Germany.

== International career ==
Jašarević made his debut for Bosnia and Herzegovina in a November 1996 friendly match away against Italy and has earned a total of 5 caps, scoring no goals. His final international was a September 1997 World Cup qualification match against Slovenia.
