= Muslija Ramović =

Montenegrin footballer

Personal information
- Full name: Muslija Ramović
- Date of birth: 13 September 1965
- Place of birth: Bijelo Polje, SFR Yugoslavia
- Position: Forward

Youth career
- Jedinstvo Bijelo Polje

Senior career*
Years	Team	Apps	(Gls)
1982-1985	Jedinstvo Bijelo Polje	41	(12)
1985-1989	Jedinstvo Brčko	50	(21)
1989-1990	Spartak Subotica	31	(3)
1990-1991	Sarajevo	32	(3)
1991-1995	Novi Pazar	40	(8)
Total		194	(47)
- * Club domestic league appearances and goals

Muslija Ramović (born 13 September 1965) is a Montenegrin retired footballer who played as a forward.
