= Miodrag Ćirković =

Serbian footballer

- Ćirković with Sarajevo in 1990

Personal information
- Full name: Miodrag Ćirković
- Date of birth: 23 October 1965 (age 61)
- Place of birth: Kosovo Polje, SFR Yugoslavia
- Height: 1.82 m (6 ft 0 in)
- Position: Midfielder

Youth career
- 1980–1984: Red Star Belgrade

Senior career*
Years	Team	Apps	(Gls)
1984–1985	Vrbas	8	(0)
1985	Maribor	13	(0)
1985–1986	Priština	24	(1)
1987–1988	Sutjeska	1	(1)
1988–1989	Priština	2	(0)
1989–1991	Sarajevo	49	(2)

Managerial career
- 2003: Leonidio
- 2009: Kastoria
- 2009–2010: Platanias
- 2011: Ionikos
- 2011: Ilioupoli
- 2011: Pannafpliakos
- 2012: Trikala
- 2012: Atromitos Lappa
- 2012: Diagoras
- 2012–2013: Doxa Nea Manolada
- 2013: Ilioupoli
- * Club domestic league appearances and goals

Miodrag Ćirković (Serbian Cyrillic: Миодраг Ћирковић; born 23 October 1965) is a Serbian retired footballer.
