= Srđan Slagalo =

Bosnian footballer

Personal information
- Date of birth: 8 July 1966 (age 60)
- Place of birth: Bosnia and Herzegovina
- Position: Defender

Senior career*
Years	Team	Apps	(Gls)
1986-1990	FK UNIS Vogošća		
1990-1992	FK Sarajevo		
1992-1993	Atlético CP	24	(3)
1993-1995	Espinho	39	(5)
1995-1998	Varzim	95	(9)
1998-1999	Leça	10	(0)
1999-2000	Famalicão	24	(6)
2000-2002	Esposende	50	(3)
- * Club domestic league appearances and goals

Srđan Slagalo (born 8 July 1966 in Bosnia and Herzegovina) is a Bosnian retired footballer.

== Club career ==
After playing for his local side, FK UNIS Vogošća, Slagalo earned a move to FK Sarajevo, the most successful team in Bosnia and Herzegovina.

Because of the Bosnian War, Slagalo left his family and girlfriend, who he never saw again, to play for Atlético Clube de Portugal in the Portuguese lower leagues in 1992.
