= Dane Kuprešanin =

Bosnian-Herzegovinian retired footballer (born 1966)

Personal information
- Full name: Dane Kuprešanin
- Date of birth: 12 June 1966 (age 60)
- Place of birth: Sarajevo, SFR Yugoslavia
- Height: 1.84 m (6 ft 1/2 in)
- Position: Midfielder

Senior career*
Years	Team	Apps	(Gls)
–1985	FK UNIS		
1986–1991	FK Sarajevo	112	(22)
1991–1992	Famalicão	31	(8)
1992–1996	Vitória Guimarães	78	(13)
Total		221	(43)
- * Club domestic league appearances and goals

Dane Kuprešanin (born 12 June 1966) is a Bosnian-Herzegovinian retired footballer who played as an attacking midfielder.

== Club career ==
Born in Sarajevo, Socialist Federal Republic of Yugoslavia, Kuprešanin started playing professionally with hometown's FK Sarajevo, making his Yugoslav First League debuts at the age of 19 and remaining six seasons with the club, for which he scored 17 top division goals in his last two years combined.

In the summer of 1991 Kuprešanin moved to Portugal and signed for F.C. Famalicão, alongside Sarajevo teammate Bernard Barnjak, as the northern side was coached by compatriot Josip Skoblar. In his debut campaign he ranked second in goals scored in the team, as it managed to maintain its top division status.

Subsequently, Kuprešanin moved to another club in the country, perennial UEFA Cup qualification candidates Vitória de Guimarães. In his first year he only appeared in 18 league games, but proved instrumental in the season's UEFA Cup, netting twice in a 3–0 first-round home win against Real Sociedad (3–2 aggregate win). He spent a further three seasons in Minho, suffering a serious knee injury in 1996 which forced him to retire from the game at only 30.
