= Vejsil Varupa =

Bosnian footballer

Personal information
- Full name: Vejsil Varupa
- Date of birth: 25 January 1971 (age 55)
- Place of birth: Vitez, SR Bosnia and Herzegovina, SFR Yugoslavia
- Height: 1.82 m (6 ft 0 in)
- Position: Defender

Senior career*
| Years | Team | Apps | (Gls) |
| 1986–1988 | Vitez | | |
| 1988–1992 | Sarajevo | 63 | (0) |
| 1992–1994 | Varteks | 0 | (0) |

International career
| 1991–1992 | Yugoslavia U21 | 13 | (1) |
- * Club domestic league appearances and goals

Vejsil Varupa (born 25 January 1971) is a Bosnian former footballer.

A big talent, he played alongside future stars like Zlatko Zahović and Mario Stanić for Yugoslav representative teams, but his career ended at age 22 after he was seriously injured in a road accident where teammate Esad Zilkić died.

== Personal life ==
He was the older brother of Elvedin Varupa.
