= Miloš Nedić =

Bosnian-Herzegovinian footballer

Personal information
- Full name: Miloš Nedić
- Date of birth: 17 October 1964 (age 62)
- Place of birth: Ustikolina, SFR Yugoslavia
- Height: 1.89 m (6 ft 2 1/2 in)
- Positions: Sweeper; defender

Senior career*
| Years | Team | Apps | (Gls) |
| –1986 | Sutjeska Foča | | |
| 1986–1992 | FK Sarajevo | 158 | (21) |
| 1992–1994 | Eintracht Braunschweig | 41 | (4) |
| 1994–1997 | Carl Zeiss Jena | 92 | (5) |
| 1997–1998 | Sachsen Leipzig | 13 | (0) |
| 1998–1999 | Rot-Weiß Erfurt | 9 | (0) |
| 1999 | Wolfenbütteler SV | | |
- * Club domestic league appearances and goals

Miloš Nedić (born 17 October 1964) is a Bosnian-Herzegovinian former footballer who played as sweeper or defender for FK Sarajevo and several German clubs.
