= Nudžein Geca =

Bosnian footballer (born 1966)

Personal information
- Date of birth: 10 May 1966 (age 60)
- Place of birth: Goražde, SFR Yugoslavia
- Position: Defender

Senior career*
Years	Team	Apps	(Gls)
1985–1988	Radnički Goražde	51	(3)
1988–1995	FK Sarajevo	94	(4)
1995–2000	Bosna Visoko	22	(0)
2001–2002	Željezničar	15	(0)
2003–2003	Bosna Visoko	7	(0)

International career
1996–1998	Bosnia and Herzegovina	6	(0)
- * Club domestic league appearances and goals

Nudžein Geca (born 10 May 1966) is a retired Bosnian-Herzegovinian professional footballer who played as a defender.

== Club career ==
Geca started his senior professional career as a 16 year old with Radnički Goražde. In the summer of 1988 he was transferred to Yugoslav First League side FK Sarajevo, whom he represented until 1995. He further played for Bosna Visoko and Željezničar, before retiring in 2003.

== International career ==
He made his debut for Bosnia and Herzegovina in an October 1996 FIFA World Cup qualification match against Croatia and has earned a total of 6 caps, scoring no goals. His final international was a November 1997 friendly match against Tunisia.
