= Igor Lazić (footballer, born 1967) =

Bosnian-Herzegovinian footballer (born 1967)

Personal information
- Date of birth: 8 August 1967 (age 59)
- Place of birth: Sarajevo, SFR Yugoslavia
- Position: Attacking midfielder

Senior career*
Years	Team	Apps	(Gls)
1985–1992	Sarajevo	117	(7)
1992–1994	Valence	44	(8)
1994–1995	Norcap Olympique		
1995	FC St. Gallen		
1995–1996	Dynamo Dresden	40	(17)
1998–2000	VfB Leipzig	46	(9)
2000–2002	SV Babelsberg 03	33	(8)
2002–2003	Ludwigsfelder FC		
2003–2004	FSV Hoyerswerda		
2004	BSV Sebnitz		

Managerial career
- 2005–2006: Arminia Bielefeld II
- 2009–2010: TuS Koblenz
- 2011: BFC Dynamo
- * Club domestic league appearances and goals

Igor Lazić (born 8 August 1967) is a Bosnian-Herzegovinian former professional footballer who played as an attacking midfielder.

== Career ==
Lazić began his career with Sarajevo, winning the 1984–85 Yugoslav First League. He played for Energie Cottbus in the DFB-Pokal.
