= Slovenian PrvaLiga records and statistics =

Football league statistics

The top tier of Slovenian football, the Slovenian PrvaLiga, was formed in 1991 after Slovenia became an independent country, and was firstly contested in the 1991–92 season. The following page details the football records and statistics of the Slovenian PrvaLiga since then. All statistics below are correct as of end of the 2025–26 Slovenian PrvaLiga season.

== League records ==
=== Titles ===
- Most titles: 16, Maribor
- Most consecutive title wins: 7, Maribor (between 1996–97 and 2002–03)
- Biggest title-winning margin: 20 points, 2011–12; Maribor (85 points) over Olimpija Ljubljana (65 points)
- Smallest title-winning margin: 0 points, joint record:
  - 2017–18 (Olimpija Ljubljana and Maribor both finished with 80 points; Olimpija won the title due to better head-to-head record)
  - 2020–21 (Mura and Maribor both finished with 63 points; Mura won the title due to better head-to-head record)

=== Points ===
- Most points in a season: 85, Maribor (2011–12)
- Most points in a season without winning the league: 80, Maribor (2017–18)
- Fewest points in a season: 3, Jadran Dekani (1994–95)
- Fewest points in a season while winning the league (2 points awarded for a win): 44, Olimpija (1994–95)
- Fewest points in a season while winning the league (3 points awarded for a win): 56, Gorica (2003–04)
- Most points in total: 2,266, Maribor

=== Wins ===
- Most wins in a season (40 games): 30, Olimpija (1991–92)
- Fewest wins in a season: 0, joint record:
  - Jadran Dekani (1994–95)
  - Rudar Velenje (2019–20)
- Most home wins in a season: 19, Olimpija (1991–92)
- Most away wins in a season: 14, Maribor (2013–14 and 2018–19)
- Most consecutive wins: 12, joint record:
  - Olimpija (between 8 March 1992 and 6 May 1992)
  - Maribor (between 22 May 1999 and 3 October 1999)
- Most consecutive games without a win: 31, Jadran Dekani (Note: Jadran Dekani were relegated in the 1994–95 season, when they were without a win for 31 consecutive games. The record may be extended if they are ever promoted back to the top division.) (between 12 June 1994 and 31 May 1995)
- Most wins in total: 680, Maribor

=== Defeats ===
- Most defeats in a season: 30, Izola (1995–96)
- Fewest losses in a season: 2, joint record:
  - Olimpija (1993–94)
  - Maribor (1999–2000)
  - Olimpija Ljubljana (2017–18)
- Longest unbeaten run: 32 games, Domžale (between 13 May 2006 and 15 April 2007)
- Fewest home losses in a season: 0, joint record:
  - Maribor (1991–92, 1992–93, 1998–99, and 1999–2000)
  - Olimpija (1991–92, 1992–93, and 1993–94)
  - Gorica (1995–96 and 2005–06)
  - Izola (1991–92)
  - Beltinci (1994–95)
  - Mura (1995–96)
  - Primorje (1996–97)
  - Koper (2001–02)
  - Domžale (2006–07)
  - Olimpija Ljubljana (2017–18)
- Fewest away losses in a season: 0, Maribor (2002–03)
- Most consecutive losses: 15, Izola (between 17 March 1996 and 8 June 1996)
- Most losses in total: 417, Celje

=== Draws ===
- Most draws in a season: 18, Naklo (1991–92)
- Fewest draws in a season: 3, Jadran Dekani (1994–95)
- Most home draws in a season: 10, joint record:
  - Naklo (1991–92)
  - Radomlje (2022–23)
- Most consecutive draws: 8, Koper (between 12 August 2006 and 23 September 2006)
- Most draws in total: 313, Celje

=== Attendances ===
- Highest attendance, single game: 14,000, joint record:
  - Maribor v. Beltinci, 1 June 1997
  - Olimpija Ljubljana v. Maribor, 7 May 2016
- Highest average home attendance: 5,289, Maribor (1996–97)

==== All-time attendances ====
List of year ranges, representing the league's total and average attendance figures, the highest single match attendance, and the highest average club attendance during those timeframes
Year	Number of matches (teams)	Total attendance	Average attendance	Highest match attendance	Highest average home attendance (team)
1991–92	420 (21)	318,160	757	7,000	1,512 (Maribor)
1992–93	306 (18)	291,250	951	7,000	2,276 (Maribor)
1993–94	240 (16)	262,300	1,092	5,000	2,867 (Mura)
1994–95	240 (16)	270,450	1,126	7,000	2,720 (Maribor)
1995–96	180 (10)	296,600	1,647	7,000	2,717 (Maribor)
1996–97	180 (10)	304,900	1,693	14,000	5,289 (Maribor)
1997–98	180 (10)	254,800	1,415	8,000	3,178 (Maribor)
1998–99	198 (12)	258,450	1,305	8,000	2,959 (Maribor)
1999–2000	198 (12)	190,200	960	6,000	2,424 (Maribor)
2000–01	198 (12)	234,780	1,185	8,000	2,788 (Maribor)
2001–02	198 (12)	230,150	1,162	9,000	2,947 (Maribor)
2002–03	185 (12)	230,300	1,244	9,000	2,672 (Olimpija)
2003–04	192 (12)	229,850	1,197	7,000	2,563 (Mura)
2004–05	192 (12)	156,414	818	4,000	1,394 (Mura)
2005–06	180 (10)	170,114	966	5,000	2,156 (Maribor)
2006–07	180 (10)	177,679	987	3,500	1,944 (Maribor)
2007–08	180 (10)	181,965	1,010	12,435	2,502 (Maribor)
2008–09	180 (10)	215,830	1,199	9,000	3,694 (Maribor)
2009–10	180 (10)	152,600	847	6,000	1,778 (Maribor)
2010–11	180 (10)	217,830	1,210	11,000	3,589 (Maribor)
2011–12	180 (10)	246,290	1,368	12,500	3,800 (Maribor)
2012–13	180 (10)	158,530	880	9,000	2,833 (Maribor)
2013–14	180 (10)	158,947	883	6,500	3,089 (Maribor)
2014–15	180 (10)	194,590	1,081	10,000	4,406 (Maribor)
2015–16	180 (10)	282,490	1,569	14,000	4,350 (Olimpija Ljubljana)
2016–17	180 (10)	248,750	1,381	13,770	4,222 (Maribor)
2017–18	180 (10)	214,675	1,199	13,000	3,550 (Olimpija Ljubljana)
2018–19	180 (10)	263,300	1,462	12,000	4,750 (Maribor)
2019–20 (Note: Attendances were affected by the COVID-19 pandemic in Slovenia; many games were played either behind closed doors or at reduced capacity.)	180 (10)	185,693	1,043	9,000	2,830 (Maribor)
2020–21	180 (10)	13,488	86	3,200	180 (Maribor)
2021–22	180 (10)	180,364	1,019	9,999	3,053 (Maribor)
2022–23	180 (10)	227,209	1,276	9,611	3,384 (Maribor)
2023–24	180 (10)	223,148	1,254	10,460	3,081 (Maribor)
2024–25	180 (10)	248,958	1,383	9,845	3,850 (Maribor)
2025–26	162 (10) (Note: Domžale withdrew from the competition after 18 rounds.)	214,515	1,332	8,900	3,500 (Maribor)

=== Goals ===
- Most goals scored in a season: 102, Olimpija (1991–92)
- Fewest goals scored in a season: 12, Jadran Dekani (1994–95)
- Most goals conceded in a season: 140, Izola (1995–96)
- Fewest goals conceded in a season: 17, Olimpija Ljubljana (2017–18)
- Best goal difference in a season: +84, Olimpija (1991–92)
- Worst goal difference in a season: –127, Izola (1995–96)
- Most goals scored in total: 2,280, Maribor
- Most goals conceded in total: 1,573, Celje

== Player records ==
=== Appearances ===
- Most PrvaLiga appearances: 488, Sebastjan Gobec (Celje, 2 March 1997 to 30 May 2015)
- Most PrvaLiga minutes played: 40,577, Sebastjan Gobec
- Most seasons appeared in: 19, Sebastjan Gobec (every season from 1996–97 to 2014–15)
- Oldest player: Jasmin Handanović, 42 years, 166 days (for Maribor v. Celje, 12 July 2020)

Rank	Name	Seasons	Appearances
1	Sebastjan Gobec	19	488
2	Marcos Tavares	15	436
3	Dušan Kosič	14	421
3	Janez Strajnar	18	421
5	Mitja Viler	18	411
6	Danijel Brezič	16	406
7	Simon Sešlar	15	405
8	Miran Srebrnič	14	400
9	Dejan Djuranovič	14	388
10	Andrej Poljšak	14	381

=== Goals ===
- First PrvaLiga goal: Miljenko Dovečer (for Nafta v. Beltinci, 18 August 1991)
- Most PrvaLiga goals: 159, Marcos Tavares
- Most goals in a season: 29, Zoran Ubavič (1991–92)
- Fastest goal: 8 seconds, Marcos Tavares (for Maribor v. Domžale, 22 April 2017)
- Youngest goalscorer: Martin Kramarič, 16 years, 4 months and 29 days (for Krka v. Rudar, 12 April 2014)
- Most consecutive PrvaLiga appearances scored in: 10, Novica Nikčević (1997–98 and 1998–99)
- Highest number of different clubs to score for: 8, Ermin Rakovič (Celje, Olimpija, Maribor, Mura, Domžale, Interblock, Drava Ptuj, Olimpija Ljubljana)
- Most goals in a game: 5, joint record:
  - Štefan Škaper (for Beltinci v. Kočevje, 31 May 1995)
  - Zoran Ubavič (for Olimpija v. Jadran Dekani, 7 June 1992)
- Most PrvaLiga hat-tricks: 8, Štefan Škaper
- Most PrvaLiga own goals: 5, Alen Jogan
- Most own goals in a season: 4, Žan Žužek (2020–21)

Rank	Name	Goals	Appearances	Average	First goal	Last goal
1	Marcos Tavares	159	436	0.36	2007–08	2021–22
2	Štefan Škaper	130	226	0.58	1991–92	1999–2000
3	Kliton Bozgo	109	207	0.53	1993–94	2004–05
4	Ermin Rakovič	108	269	0.4	1995–96	2010–11
5	Milan Osterc	106	276	0.38	1994–95	2011–12
5	Rok Kronaveter	106	335	0.32	2005–06	2022–23
7	Damir Pekič	103	266	0.39	1999–2000	2011–12
8	Marko Kmetec	95	271	0.35	1995–96	2012–13
9	Dalibor Volaš	92	241	0.38	2005–06	2018–19
10	Ismet Ekmečić	90	199	0.45	1994–95	2002–03
10	Anton Žlogar	90	300	0.3	1996–97	2004–05

=== Disciplinary ===
- Most red cards for a player: 11, Gregor Blatnik
- Most yellow cards for a player: 146, Sebastjan Gobec

== Match records ==
=== Scorelines ===
- Biggest home win: 12–0, Olimpija v. Jadran Dekani (7 June 1992)
- Biggest away win: 0–10, Jadran Dekani v. Slavija Vevče (22 October 1994)

== All-time PrvaLiga table ==
The all-time Slovenian PrvaLiga table is a cumulative record of all official match results, points and goals of every team that has played in the PrvaLiga since its inception in 1991. The competition structure has changed over time and the number of clubs in the league varied, ranging from 21 in the first season to 10 in its present form. In addition, the 1995–96 season was the first one with the rule of three points being awarded for each win. Prior to that, each winning team received two points. The table that follows is accurate as of the end of the 2025–26 season.

Current status of clubs
†	Member of the 2026–27 Slovenian PrvaLiga
‡	Member of the 2026–27 Slovenian Second League
#	Club competes outside the top two divisions or does not have a senior team.
§	Club was disbanded and no longer exist.

List of PrvaLiga results, representing seasons, and displaying the types of accomplishments by the clubs during those timeframes
Rank	Club	Seasons	Pld	W	D	L	GF	GA	Pts	1st	2nd	3rd	First season	Last season	Best result
1	Maribor †	35	1224	680	302	242	2280	1201	2266	16	10	4	1991–92	2025–26	Champions
2	Celje †	35	1224	494	313	417	1799	1573	1739	3	3	1	1991–92	2025–26	Champions
3	Gorica §	30	1046	431	271	344	1521	1293	1508	4	5	5	1991–92	2022–23	Champions
4	Koper †	29	1011	397	283	331	1335	1241	1428	1	4	4	1991–92	2025–26	Champions
5	Domžale §	28	974	374	258	342	1385	1261	1375	2	3	5	1991–92	2025–26	Champions
6	Olimpija Ljubljana †	17	610	314	143	153	1007	621	1085	4	3	5	2009–10	2025–26	Champions
7	Rudar Velenje ‡	25	874	293	214	367	1123	1263	1041	—	—	4	1991–92	2019–20	3rd
8	NK Primorje §	18	616	233	157	226	888	809	824	—	2	1	1991–92	2010–11	Runners-up
9	Olimpija §	14	469	237	104	128	935	553	720	4	3	1	1991–92	2004–05	Champions
10	NK Mura §	14	470	204	120	146	673	545	660	—	2	2	1991–92	2004–05	Runners-up
11	NŠ Mura †	8	286	100	89	97	378	361	389	1	—	—	2018–19	2025–26	Champions
12	Korotan Prevalje §	9	290	102	62	126	352	399	354	—	—	—	1994–95	2002–03	4th
13	Nafta Lendava §	9	326	96	78	152	380	537	347	—	—	—	1991–92	2011–12	6th
14	Bravo †	7	250	90	76	84	311	303	346	—	—	1	2019–20	2025–26	3rd
15	Aluminij †	9	322	86	80	156	365	528	338	—	—	—	2012–13	2025–26	5th
16	Beltinci §	9	308	96	70	142	414	526	304	—	—	—	1991–92	1999–2000	5th
17	Drava Ptuj §	7	244	81	56	107	311	367	299	—	—	—	2003–04	2009–10	4th
18	Triglav Kranj ‡	9	318	74	68	176	315	606	290	—	—	—	1998–99	2019–20	7th
19	Ljubljana §	7	230	86	57	87	300	324	261	—	—	—	1991–92	2004–05	4th
20	Radomlje †	7	250	57	61	132	246	453	232	—	—	—	2014–15	2025–26	6th
21	Tabor Sežana ‡	5	177	42	46	89	178	274	172	—	—	—	2000–01	2022–23	6th
22	IB 1975 Ljubljana #	4	144	41	33	70	170	225	156	—	—	—	2006–07	2009–10	5th
23	Krka ‡	5	172	42	44	86	148	262	155	—	—	—	1992–93	2015–16	7th
24	Zavrč §	3	108	40	22	46	128	156	142	—	—	—	2013–14	2015–16	5th
25	Izola §	5	170	49	41	80	195	336	140	—	—	1	1991–92	1995–96	3rd
26	Dravograd #	4	129	37	28	64	167	232	139	—	—	—	1999–2000	2003–04	7th
27	Krško Posavje ‡	4	144	32	42	70	128	224	138	—	—	—	2015–16	2018–19	6th
28	Naklo §	4	134	45	44	45	170	174	134	—	—	—	1991–92	1994–95	5th
29	Šmartno §	3	97	31	33	33	130	133	126	—	—	—	2001–02	2003–04	4th
30	Svoboda #	3	104	37	27	40	120	147	101	—	—	—	1991–92	1993–94	6th
31	Bela Krajina §	3	104	21	33	50	104	169	96	—	—	—	2004–05	2006–07	9th
32	Mura 05 §	2	72	27	11	34	95	112	92	—	—	1	2011–12	2012–13	3rd
33	Slovan ‡	3	104	28	33	43	131	153	89	—	—	—	1991–92	1993–94	10th
34	Zagorje #	3	106	25	26	55	94	146	78	—	—	—	1991–92	2004–05	12th
35	ND Primorje ‡	2	70	17	14	39	72	135	65	—	—	—	2024–25	2025–26	6th
36	Steklar §	2	74	16	26	32	90	147	58	—	—	—	1991–92	1992–93	16th
37	Jadran Dekani ‡	3	100	11	17	72	60	254	39	—	—	—	1991–92	1994–95	14th
38	Slavija Vevče §	2	66	12	11	43	73	141	39	—	—	—	1994–95	1997–98	10th
39	Rogaška #	1	36	10	6	20	37	64	36	—	—	—	2023–24	2023–24	8th
40	Rudar Trbovlje #	1	40	12	9	19	47	60	33	—	—	—	1991–92	1991–92	18th
41	Nafta 1903 †	1	36	6	10	20	33	69	28	—	—	—	2024–25	2024–25	10th
42	Ankaran Hrvatini §	1	36	5	11	20	33	84	26	—	—	—	2017–18	2017–18	10th
43	Medvode #	1	40	9	5	26	26	84	23	—	—	—	1991–92	1991–92	20th
44	Železničar Maribor §	1	34	6	8	20	30	62	20	—	—	—	1992–93	1992–93	17th
45	Pohorje #	1	33	4	6	23	26	73	18	—	—	—	1999–2000	1999–2000	11th
46	Ivančna Gorica #	1	36	4	5	27	39	95	17	—	—	—	2007–08	2007–08	10th
47	Kočevje #	1	30	4	9	17	24	91	17	—	—	—	1994–95	1994–95	15th
48	Brinje Grosuplje †	—	—	—	—	—	—	—	—	—	—	—	2026–27	2026–27	—

== Managers ==
- Most PrvaLiga winner's medals: 6, joint record:
  - Bojan Prašnikar (Olimpija and Maribor) – 1993, 1994, 1997, 1998, 1999, 2002
  - Darko Milanič (Maribor) – 2009, 2011, 2012, 2013, 2017, 2019
