= List of Slovenian football champions =

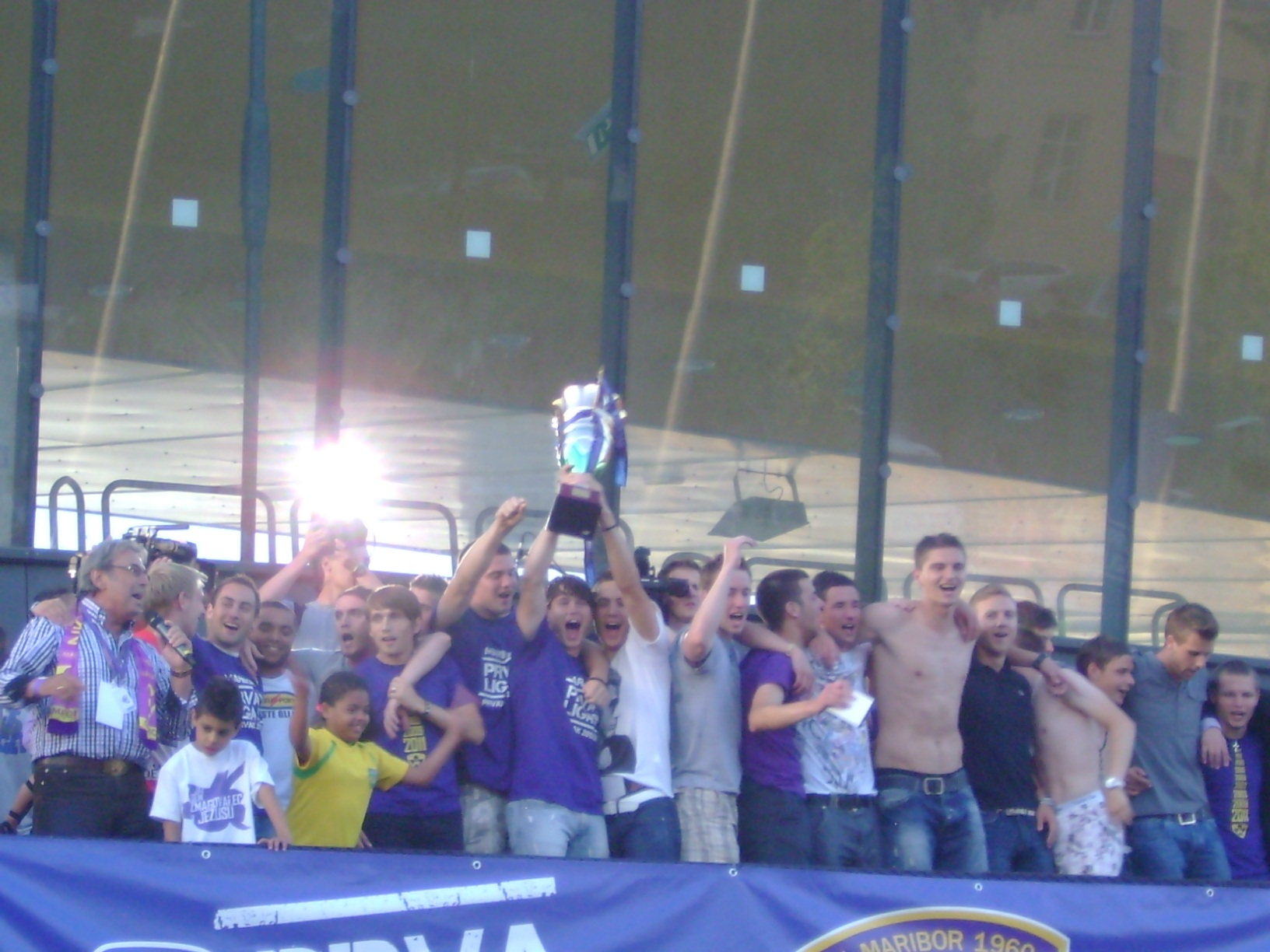
PrvaLiga trophy being lifted in celebration of Maribor's ninth league title in 2011

The Slovenian football champions are the winners of the highest league of association football in Slovenia, PrvaLiga. Also known by the abbreviation 1. SNL, PrvaLiga is contested on a round-robin basis and the championship is awarded to the club that finishes top of the league at the end of the season. The league was established after the independence of Slovenia in 1991, originally containing 21 clubs. Before that, Maribor, Nafta Lendava and Olimpija were the only Slovenian teams who participated in the Yugoslav top division, Yugoslav First League, between the end of World War II in 1945 and the breakup of Yugoslavia in 1991. While being a part of the Yugoslav football system, most of the Slovenian clubs competed for the title of regional champions in the Slovenian Republic Football League. However, the Republic League was officially the third tier of football most of the time and the competition was usually without the top Slovenian clubs, who played in the Yugoslav Second League or the country's top division.

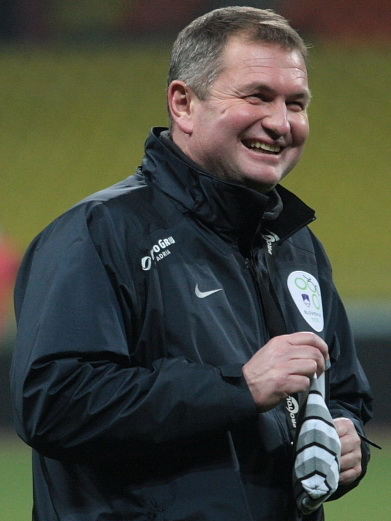
Matjaž Kek won the PrvaLiga title as a footballer and manager.

Following the independence of Slovenia, the Football Association of Slovenia separated from the Football Association of Yugoslavia and established its own football competitions. Of the founding clubs in the PrvaLiga, only Celje and Maribor have never been relegated as of the 2025–26 season. The format and the number of clubs in the league has changed over time, ranging from 21 clubs in the first season to 10 clubs in its present form. The top three clubs at the end of the season are awarded a qualifying spot in the UEFA Champions League and the UEFA Conference League, with the bottom one being relegated to the Slovenian Second League.

Olimpija won the first title. They had a long tradition of playing in the Yugoslav top division and their squad was still composed of players from that era. Olimpija dominated the league and won a further three championships before Gorica won their first in the 1995–96 season. Following Gorica's success, Maribor won their first championship in 1997. This started a record-breaking streak of seven successive league championships which came to an end when Gorica won their second title in the 2003–04 season. The club from Nova Gorica went on to win an additional two titles, becoming the third club to win three consecutive championships. During the 2006–07 season, Domžale, a club that played in the Slovenian second division four seasons earlier, won their first title, a feat they repeated the next season. Between 2009 and 2019, Maribor became a major force in Slovenian football for the second time, winning eight out of eleven championships in that period. In 2020 and 2021, Celje and Mura won their first titles, respectively.

Maribor is the most successful club; they have won the championship 16 times. Seven of Maribor's titles came during the late 1990s and early 2000s when the club was led alternately by managers Bojan Prašnikar, Ivo Šušak and Matjaž Kek. Between 2009 and 2013, Darko Milanič led the club to four championships. In 2017 and 2019, during his second spell with Maribor, Milanič won additional two titles with the club. Olimpija won four titles, all in successive years between 1992 and 1995. In addition, Olimpija became the first Slovenian football champion to no longer exist, as it was dissolved by the end of the 2004–05 season when it declared bankruptcy. Tied with four championships are Gorica and Olimpija Ljubljana, with the latter being founded in 2005 as a successor club of the dissolved Olimpija. They are followed by Celje with three titles and Domžale with two titles, while Koper and Mura have won one title each. Maribor have won the most doubles, winning the league and the Slovenian Cup four times in the course of the same season. The current champions are Celje, who won the 2025–26 edition.

== Champions ==
Correct as of the 2025–26 Slovenian PrvaLiga season. For the information on the season in progress, see 2026–27 Slovenian PrvaLiga.

Key
†	Champions also won the Slovenian Cup that season

List of year ranges, representing seasons, and displaying the types of accomplishments of awards by the clubs and top players during those timeframes
Year	Champions (number of titles)	Runners-up	Third place	Leading goalscorer (top scorer's club(s))	Goals
1991–92	Olimpija	Maribor	Izola	Zoran Ubavič (Olimpija)	29
1992–93	Olimpija (2) †	Maribor	Mura	Sašo Udovič (Slovan)	25
1993–94	Olimpija (3)	Mura	Maribor	Štefan Škaper (Beltinci)	23
1994–95	Olimpija (4)	Maribor	Gorica	Štefan Škaper (Beltinci)	25
1995–96	Gorica	Olimpija	Mura	Ermin Šiljak (Olimpija)	28
1996–97	Maribor †	Primorje	Gorica	Faik Kamberović (Celje)	21
1997–98	Maribor (2)	Mura	Gorica	Ismet Ekmečić (Olimpija)	21
1998–99	Maribor (3) †	Gorica	Rudar Velenje	Novica Nikčević (Gorica)	17
1999–2000	Maribor (4)	Gorica	Rudar Velenje	Kliton Bozgo (Maribor)	24
2000–01	Maribor (5)	Olimpija	Primorje	Damir Pekič (Celje)	23
2001–02	Maribor (6)	Primorje	Koper	Romano Obilinović (Primorje)	16
2002–03	Maribor (7)	Celje	Olimpija	Marko Kmetec (Ljubljana/Olimpija)	22
2003–04	Gorica (2)	Olimpija	Maribor	Dražen Žeželj (Ljubljana/Primorje)	19
2004–05	Gorica (3)	Domžale	Celje	Kliton Bozgo (Maribor)	18
2005–06	Gorica (4)	Domžale	Koper	Miran Burgič (Gorica)	24
2006–07	Domžale	Gorica	Maribor	Nikola Nikezić (Gorica)	22
2007–08	Domžale (2)	Koper	Gorica	Dario Zahora (Domžale)	22
2008–09	Maribor (8)	Gorica	Rudar Velenje	Etien Velikonja (Gorica)	17
2009–10	Koper	Maribor	Gorica	Milan Osterc (Koper)	23
2010–11	Maribor (9)	Domžale	Koper	Marcos Tavares (Maribor)	16
2011–12	Maribor (10) †	Olimpija Ljubljana	Mura 05	Dare Vršič (Olimpija Ljubljana)	22
2012–13	Maribor (11) †	Olimpija Ljubljana	Domžale	Marcos Tavares (Maribor)	17
2013–14	Maribor (12)	Koper	Rudar Velenje	Mate Eterović (Rudar Velenje)	19
2014–15	Maribor (13)	Celje	Domžale	Marcos Tavares (Maribor)	17
2015–16	Olimpija Ljubljana	Maribor	Domžale	Rok Kronaveter (Olimpija Ljubljana); Jean-Philippe Mendy (Maribor); Andraž Šporar (Olimpija Ljubljana)	17
2016–17	Maribor (14)	Gorica	Olimpija Ljubljana	John Mary (Rudar Velenje)	17
2017–18	Olimpija Ljubljana (2) †	Maribor	Domžale	Luka Zahović (Maribor)	18
2018–19	Maribor (15)	Olimpija Ljubljana	Domžale	Luka Zahović (Maribor)	18
2019–20	Celje	Maribor	Olimpija Ljubljana	Ante Vukušić (Olimpija Ljubljana)	26
2020–21	Mura	Maribor	Olimpija Ljubljana	Jan Mlakar (Maribor); Nardin Mulahusejnović (Koper)	14
2021–22	Maribor (16)	Koper	Olimpija Ljubljana	Ognjen Mudrinski (Maribor)	17
2022–23	Olimpija Ljubljana (3) †	Celje	Maribor	Žan Vipotnik (Maribor)	20
2023–24	Celje (2)	Maribor	Olimpija Ljubljana	Aljoša Matko (Celje)	18
2024–25	Olimpija Ljubljana (4)	Maribor	Koper	Raul Florucz (Olimpija Ljubljana)	15
2025–26	Celje (3)	Koper	Bravo	Nikita Iosifov (Celje); Benjamin Tetteh (Maribor)	12

== Total titles won ==
Correct as of the 2025–26 Slovenian PrvaLiga season. As of 2026, a total of eight different clubs have been Slovenian football champions during the 35 PrvaLiga seasons.

List of accomplishments of awards by the clubs and displaying their best seasons
Club	Winners	Runners-up	Winning years
Maribor	16	10	1996–97, 1997–98, 1998–99, 1999–2000, 2000–01, 2001–02, 2002–03, 2008–09, 2010–11, 2011–12, 2012–13, 2013–14, 2014–15, 2016–17, 2018–19, 2021–22
Gorica	4	5	1995–96, 2003–04, 2004–05, 2005–06
Olimpija	4	3	1991–92, 1992–93, 1993–94, 1994–95
Olimpija Ljubljana	4	3	2015–16, 2017–18, 2022–23, 2024–25
Celje	3	3	2019–20, 2023–24, 2025–26
Domžale	2	3	2006–07, 2007–08
Koper	1	4	2009–10
Mura	1	0	2020–21

== Footnotes ==
1. Olimpija was declared bankrupt and dissolved following the 2004–05 season. In March 2005, a new club named Bežigrad (later renamed as Olimpija Ljubljana) was established. Legally, the new club was not entitled to claim the history and honours won by the old club, and the records and statistics are kept separately by the Football Association of Slovenia.
2. Nikola Nikezić began the 2006–07 season with Domžale, making one appearance for the club, before transferring to Gorica. His 22 goals were scored playing for Gorica.
