= Žikica Vuksanović =

Slovenian footballer

Personal information
- Date of birth: 11 May 1974 (age 51)
- Place of birth: SFR Yugoslavia
- Height: 1.95 m (6 ft 5 in)
- Position(s): Defender

Senior career*
Years	Team	Apps	(Gls)
–1997	Železničar Maribor		
1997–1999	Maribor	6	(0)
1999–2000	Korotan Prevalje	28	(2)
2000–2001	Koper	25	(0)
2001–2007	Maribor	114	(5)
2007–2010	Grazer AK	62	(7)
2010	Veržej	6	(0)
- *Club domestic league appearances and goals

Žikica Vuksanović (born 11 May 1974) is a Slovenian retired football defender. He spent most of his career playing for Maribor in the Slovenian PrvaLiga.

== Honours ==
Maribor

- Slovenian Championship (4): 1997–98, 1998–99, 2001–02, 2002–03
- Slovenian Cup (2): 1998–99, 2003–04
