= Matjaž Kek =

Slovenian footballer and manager (born 1961)

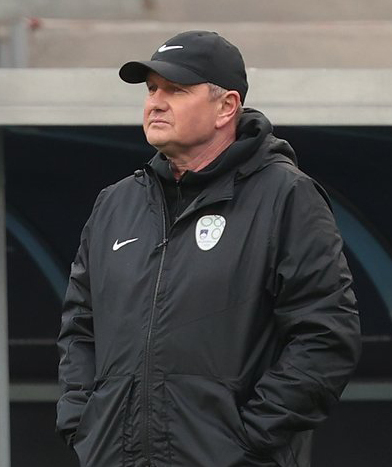
- Kek in 2021 managing Slovenia

Personal information
- Date of birth: 9 September 1961 (age 65)
- Place of birth: Maribor, PR Slovenia, Yugoslavia
- Height: 1.84 m (6 ft 0 in)
- Position: Defender

Team information
- Current team: Rijeka (head coach)

Youth career
- Maribor
- Železničar Maribor

Senior career*
Years	Team	Apps	(Gls)
1979–1980	Železničar Maribor		
1980–1985	Maribor	114	(36)
1985–1988	Spittal/Drau	98	(32)
1988–1995	GAK	113	(19)
1995–1999	Maribor	126	(17)

International career
1992	Slovenia	1	(0)

Managerial career
- 2000: Maribor
- 2001: Maribor (interim)
- 2002–2004: Maribor
- 2006: Slovenia U15
- 2006–2007: Slovenia U16
- 2007–2011: Slovenia
- 2011–2012: Al-Ittihad
- 2013–2018: Rijeka
- 2018–2025: Slovenia
- 2026–: Rijeka
- * Club domestic league appearances and goals

Matjaž Kek (born 9 September 1961) is a Slovenian professional football manager and former player who is the manager of Croatian Football League club Rijeka.

In his managerial career, he has won the Slovenian First League twice with Maribor. As manager of the Slovenia national team, he led the team to two major tournaments, qualifying for the 2010 FIFA World Cup and UEFA Euro 2024.

== Playing career ==
Kek started his career at his home club NK Maribor, before moving to another Maribor-based team, Železničar Maribor. In 1980, he returned to Maribor. In 1985 he joined the Austrian club Spittal/Drau, where he stayed for three seasons. Kek then transferred to another Austrian club, GAK of the Austrian Bundesliga where he played for seven years. After that, he returned to Maribor, where between 1995 and 1999 he won three Slovenian league titles, before retiring. Overall, Kek made 280 appearances for Maribor in all competitions over the span of eleven seasons. He spent most of his career playing in defense, mostly in the centre-back position and was known for his leadership abilities.

He was capped once by Slovenia, in a 1992 friendly match against Cyprus.

== Managerial career ==
=== Maribor ===
After finishing his career as a player, Kek stayed at Maribor, serving as an assistant manager for one season, before being appointed as manager in March 2000 after Bojan Prašnikar left the club. He immediately won the league title in the 1999–2000 season. He resigned in September 2000 after a 3–1 defeat against Korotan Prevalje. In October 2001, Kek returned to Maribor as an interim manager after Ivo Šušak resigned. A couple weeks later, he was moved to the assistant manager position after Prašnikar took over the managerial role. In September 2002, he once again became a manager of the team, and won the league title in the 2002–03 season. Kek was sacked by the team on 20 September 2004 after a string of poor results.

=== Slovenia national team ===
Between 2006 and 2007, Kek was the head coach of Slovenia's under-15 and under-16 youth teams. On 5 January 2007, Kek was appointed manager of the Slovenia national team, which he led to the 2010 FIFA World Cup after beating Russia in the play-off. On 24 October 2011, after the unsuccessful UEFA Euro 2012 qualifications, Kek and the Football Association of Slovenia came to a mutual agreement on the early termination of his contract. He was succeeded by Slaviša Stojanović.

=== Al-Ittihad ===
On 20 December 2011, Kek became the head coach of Saudi Arabian club Al-Ittihad, however, his brief encounter with the Arabian football finished abruptly when he was sacked less than two months later, on 8 February 2012.

=== Rijeka ===
On 27 February 2013, after more than a year without contract, Kek took over Croatian top division club HNK Rijeka. He led Rijeka to the group stage of the UEFA Europa League in both the 2013–14 and 2014–15 seasons. In the 2016–17 season, Kek led Rijeka to their first-ever championship title and the historic double. He also won the 2013–14 and 2016–17 editions of the Croatian Cup, as well as the 2014 Croatian Super Cup. In the 2013–14, 2014–15 and 2015–16 seasons of the Croatian First League, Rijeka finished as runners-up. With over five years at the club, Kek holds numerous club records, including for most wins and appearances for a manager. On 24 October 2016, he became Rijeka's longest-serving manager by single appointment. In June 2017, Kek signed a new three-year contract with Rijeka, which ties him with the club until June 2020. On 7 September 2017, Kek became the longest-serving manager by single appointment in the history of the Croatian First Football League. He resigned on 6 October 2018 after a 2–1 defeat against HNK Gorica.

=== Return to the Slovenia national team ===
On 27 November 2018, Kek was appointed as the manager of Slovenia for the second time in his career, replacing caretaker manager Igor Benedejčič. He managed the team in the UEFA Euro 2020 qualifiers, where Slovenia finished in fourth place with four wins out of ten games. In 2020, Slovenia went undefeated for a record eight consecutive games, and also finished first in Group 3 of the 2020–21 UEFA Nations League C and was thus promoted to League B.

In the UEFA Euro 2024 qualifiers, Kek guided Slovenia to second place in the group after defeating Kazakhstan 2–1 on the final matchday, securing the country's first European Championship appearance in 24 years. At the main tournament, Slovenia drew in all three group stage games against Denmark, Serbia and England and advanced to the knockout stages of a major tournament for the first time.

After a disappointing 2026 FIFA World Cup qualification campaign, where Slovenia failed to win any of its six games, Kek left the team on 1 December 2025 after his contract expired.

== Personal life ==
Matjaž's father, Franc, played for NK Maribor during the early 1960s, earning 51 appearances for the club and scoring one goal. His son, also named Matjaž, is a former footballer.

== Managerial statistics ==
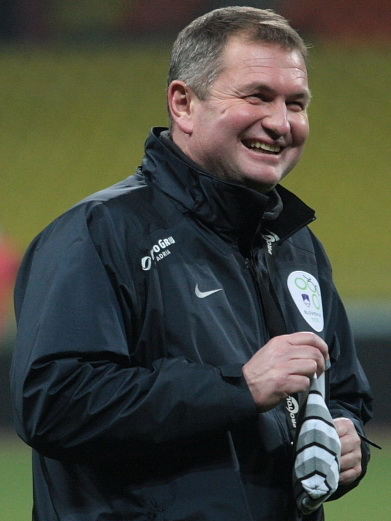
Kek as Slovenia manager in 2009

As of match played 18 November 2025

Managerial record by team and tenure
Team	From	To	Record					Ref.
Team	From	To	P	W	D	L	Win %	Ref.
Maribor	9 March 2000	10 September 2000	25	21	2	2	84.00	
Maribor	9 September 2002	20 September 2004	80	41	20	19	51.25	
Slovenia	5 January 2007	24 October 2011	49	20	9	20	40.82	
Al-Ittihad	20 December 2011	8 February 2012	11	3	2	6	27.27	
Rijeka	27 February 2013	6 October 2018	275	164	66	45	59.64	
Slovenia	27 November 2018	1 December 2025	75	32	27	16	42.67	
Total			515	281	126	108	54.56	—

== Honours ==
=== Player ===
Maribor

- Slovenian PrvaLiga: 1996–97, 1997–98, 1998–99
- Slovenian Cup: 1996–97, 1998–99

=== Manager ===
Maribor

- Slovenian PrvaLiga: 1999–2000, 2002–03
- Slovenian Cup: 2003–04

Rijeka

- Croatian First League: 2016–17
- Croatian Cup: 2013–14, 2016–17
- Croatian Super Cup: 2014
