= Eternal derby of Slovenian football (1962–2004) =

NK Maribor–NK Olimpija Ljubljana rivalry

Večni derbi
- Other names: Slovenski derbi
- Location: Ljubljana – Maribor, Slovenia
- Teams: Maribor; Olimpija
- First meeting: Olimpija 1–1 Maribor; Yugoslav Second League (2 September 1962)
- Latest meeting: Olimpija 1–0 Maribor; Slovenian PrvaLiga (7 November 2004)
- Stadiums: Bežigrad (Olimpija); Ljudski vrt (Maribor)

Statistics
- Total meetings: 83
- Most wins: Maribor (31)
- Largest victory: Olimpija 6–1 Maribor (20 July 2003)

The Eternal derby of Slovenian football, simply known as the Eternal derby (Slovene: Večni derbi) or Slovenian derby (Slovene: Slovenski derbi) was a football rivalry between NK Maribor and NK Olimpija, which was dissolved in 2005.

In 2005, a new club under the name of NK Bežigrad was founded and later changed its name to NK Olimpija Ljubljana. Because most of the fans that supported the dissolved Olimpija started to support Bežigrad, the continuation of the rivalry is considered by most Slovenian media and fans as the matches between Maribor and the new Olimpija Ljubljana, established in 2005 as NK Bežigrad. The new club consider themselves as the spiritual continuation of the dissolved club, however, legally, the current Olimpija Ljubljana is a distinct and separate club as treated by the Football Association of Slovenia.

Location of both teams

== History and rivalry culture ==
=== In Yugoslavia ===
The rivalry between Maribor and Olimpija began in the early 1960s, when the first match between the two clubs was played. Although the first match was played in 1962 it was not until the independence of Slovenia from 1991 onwards when most of the matches were played. The main reason being the fact that both clubs were part of the Yugoslav football system and, during the period from 1960 (establishment of NK Maribor) until 1991 (establishment of Slovenian league, the Slovenian PrvaLiga), played only a total of ten seasons in the same league. The two clubs were one of only three Slovenian football clubs, the other being Nafta Lendava, to play in the Yugoslav First League. Maribor played in the Yugoslav top division for a total of five seasons, between 1967–68 and 1971–72, with the best result of tenth place in 1969–70. Olimpija played in the Yugoslav first league for a total of twenty seasons, in 1953–54 and between 1965–66 and 1983–84, with the best result of seventh place in 1970–71 and 1982–83. Both clubs also played in the Yugoslav Cup, where Maribor achieved its best result in 1973 and 1980 with reaching quarter-finals, while Olimpija was the runner-up in the 1970 edition.

=== In Slovenia ===
In 1991, after Slovenia declared independence, both clubs were the founding members of the Slovenian top division, 1. SNL, and played there up until the end of the 2004–05 season and the dissolution of NK Olimpija. Until the dissolution of Olimpija, both clubs were the most successful teams in Slovenian club football. From 1991 until 2005 Maribor and Olimpija had won a combined total of eleven out of fourteen Slovenian championships (Maribor 7, Olimpija 4), and nine out of fourteen Slovenian cups (Maribor 5, Olimpija 4).

The rivalry reached its peak in the final round of the 2000–01 season, when one of the most celebrated matches in the 1. SNL history was played, when Olimpija met Maribor at their home stadium, Bežigrad. Both teams were competing for their fifth Slovenian league title. The home team needed a win for the title, while a draw was enough for Maribor. The atmosphere was electric days before the kick-off and the stadium with 8,500 seats was completely sold out. At the end, the match ended with a draw (1–1) and Maribor won their fifth consecutive title in front of 3,000 their fans that gathered in Ljubljana that day.

After the 2004–05 season, Olimpija folded due to financial issues. On 2 March 2005 a new club was established, under the name NK Bežigrad, retaining Olimpija's fans, colours and most of the youth team players. NK Bežigrad later changed its name twice. First to NK Olimpija Bežigrad and finally to NK Olimpija Ljubljana. Although the board of the newly established club and its fans see the team as the spiritual continuation of the old club, they are not regarded as the legal successors of the old NK Olimpija by the Football Association of Slovenia and are not entitled to claim the honours won by the defunct club.

However, because the new Olimpija is supported by most of the fans of the previous Olimpija, including their ultras group Green Dragons who has a long-standing rivalry with Maribor's own ultras group Viole Maribor, many see the matches between Maribor and the new club as the continuation of the rivalry and refer to it by the same name.

The first match between NK Maribor and the new NK Olimpija took place on 24 October 2007 in a Slovenian Cup quarter-final match, won by Maribor 3–1. At the time NK Olimpija was still competing under the name NK Olimpija Bežigrad.

== Fans ==
The two teams represented the two largest cities in Slovenia, the capital city of Ljubljana and the second largest city Maribor. Overall, the two clubs were always the most popular football clubs in the country. Traditionally, Ljubljana represents the wealthier western part of the country, while Maribor is the center of the poorer eastern part. In addition, Ljubljana was always the cultural, educational, economic and political center of the country and Olimpija and its fans were considered as the representatives of the upper class. Maribor, on the other hand, was one of the most industrialized cities in Yugoslavia and the majority of its fans were the representatives of the working class, which means that the added tension to the rivalry was usually also political, social and cultural as well. However, this kind of division was much more apparent in the past, as the class differences between the fanbases have faded out and the social gap that once separated the two sides has closed over the years.

Besides the city of Maribor itself and the surrounding area, NK Maribor also has a large fan base in the whole regions of Lower Styria and Slovenian Carinthia. Olimpija on the other hand draws much of its fans from the central part of the country, the majority from the city of Ljubljana with the surrounding area of southern Upper Carniola and northwestern Lower Carniola.

Both clubs always had support on their matches from ultras groups called Viole Maribor, supporting NK Maribor, and Green Dragons who supported NK Olimpija. The two groups are among the largest in the country and it is not uncommon that the matches between the two clubs were sometimes interrupted by clashes between the two groups or with the police. On many occasions, before or after the matches, the fans of the two clubs clashed on the streets. One of the worst incidents, in April 2010 after a match, resulted in a stabbing of a member of the Green Dragons who, with a group of friends, got into a fight with members of the Viole in Ljubljana's railway station. However, to date, there has not been any fatalities in the country related to football violence.

== Players ==
Vili Ameršek is the leading goalscorer among all players that have participated in the matches between Maribor and Olimpija. He has played in the time of SFR Yugoslavia for Olimpija and scored a total of 14 goals against Maribor. Second place is shared between Marko Kmetec and Damir Pekič who both scored 8 goals and are the most successful players after the independence of Slovenia in 1991 and the establishment of the 1. SNL. Gregor Židan, Željko Milinovič and Amir Karić are the only three players who have played for all three clubs involved in the rivalry. Židan played for the old Olimpija in the Yugoslav first league, while later playing for Maribor in the Slovenian first league, 1. SNL. He then retired, only to return to football couple of years later where he played for the new Olimpija Ljubljana, at the time still known by the name NK Bežigrad, in lower tiers of Slovenian football. Milanič on the other hand played in 1. SNL for both clubs and later joined the new Olimpija, at the time known by the name NK Bežigrad where he played less than a season and eventually finished his career. Karić also played for both Maribor and the old Olimpija in 1. SNL. After few years spent abroad he eventually joined the new Olimpija, at the time still known as NK Bežigrad and then Olimpija Bežigrad, where he played in lower tiers of Slovenian football for couple of seasons before moving to Koper.

=== Direct transfers ===
Six players have transferred directly from Maribor to Olimpija, and eight players from Olimpija to Maribor. Kliton Bozgo and Nastja Čeh have transferred directly from Maribor to Olimpija and back.

Maribor to Olimpija

- Kliton Bozgo
- Anton Čeh
- Nastja Čeh
- Edin Hadžialagić
- Marko Kmetec
- Sašo Lukić

Olimpija to Maribor

- Damjan Gajser
- Enver Čirić
- Dejan Djuranović
- Ismet Ekmečić
- Suad Fileković
- Ivica Pešić
- Marko Simeunovič
- Muamer Vugdalić

== Honours ==
Official statistics of honours won by NK Maribor and NK Olimpija, established in 1945 and dissolved in 2005, as listed by the Football Association of Slovenia. The honours are counted until 2005, when Olimpija was dissolved.

Major honours won
Competition	Maribor	Olimpija
1. SNL	7	4
Slovenian Cup	5	4
Slovenian Supercup	0	1
Total	12	9

== Matches list ==
=== Yugoslav football leagues ===
The head-to-head matches shows the results of Maribor and Olimpija, when they played in the same league.

Host	Maribor				Olimpija			
Season	R.	Venue	Atten.	Score	R.	Venue	Atten.	Score
1962–63^{1}	18	Ljudski vrt	12,000	3–2	3	Bežigrad	10,000	1–1
1963–64^{1}	6	Ljudski vrt	12,000	1–1	21	Bežigrad	20,000	1–1
1964–65^{1}	26	Ljudski vrt	10,000	0–4	14	Bežigrad	13,000	3–1
1967–68	13	Ljudski vrt	13,000	0–0	28	Bežigrad	8,000	2–2
1968–69	2	Ljudski vrt	8,000	2–2	19	Bežigrad	5,000	4–1
1969–70	11	Ljudski vrt	7,000	3–2	28	Bežigrad	5,000	2–1
1970–71	22	Ljudski vrt	6,000	1–0	5	Bežigrad	7,000	3–1
1971–72	34	Ljudski vrt	1,500	3–6	17	Bežigrad	5,000	3–0
1984–85^{1}	28	Ljudski vrt	7,000	2–0	11	Bežigrad	4,000	1–0
1985–86^{2}	3	Ljudski vrt	3,500	2–1	16	Bežigrad	1,500	0–0

^{1}Second Yugoslav division; ^{2}Third Yugoslav Division
Source: Archive data on nkmaribor.com
• Total: Olimpija 8 wins (40%), 7 draw (35%), Maribor 5 wins (25%).

=== Slovenian PrvaLiga ===
The head-to-head matches shows the results of Maribor and Olimpija. (Note: Olimpija was established in 1945 and dissolved in 2005, when they played in the 1. SNL.)

Host	Maribor					Olimpija				
Season	R.	Date	Venue	Atten.	Score	R.	Date	Venue	Atten.	Score
1991–92	13	16 October 1991	Ljudski vrt	4,000	2–1	34	6 May 1992	Bežigrad	7,000	2–0
1992–93	22	4 April 1993	Ljudski vrt	7,000	1–0	5	12 September 1992	Bežigrad	1,000	3–0
1993–94	30	12 June 1994	Ljudski vrt	4,500	3–1	15	28 November 1993	Bežigrad	5,000	1–1
1994–95	17	5 March 1995	Ljudski vrt	7,000	0–2	2	14 August 1994	Bežigrad	2,000	2–1
1995–96	4	18 August 1995	Ljudski vrt	7,000	5–1	14	29 October 1995	Bežigrad	3,000	0–1
1995–96	32	11 May 1996	Ljudski vrt	5,000	2–1	22	17 March 1996	Bežigrad	2,000	1–0
1996–97	1	4 August 1996	Ljudski vrt	5,000	0–0	11	12 October 1996	Bežigrad	2,800	1–0
1996–97	29	4 May 1997	Ljudski vrt	7,000	5–2	19	1 March 1997	Bežigrad	2,000	1–2
1997–98	4	17 August 1997	Ljudski vrt	6,500	2–0	14	2 November 1997	Bežigrad	2,000	3–1
1997–98	32	16 May 1998	Ljudski vrt	5,000	4–4	22	21 March 1998	Bežigrad	3,000	1–3
1998–99	19	13 March 1999	Ljudski vrt	7,000	3–1	8	25 September 1998	Bežigrad	5,000	1–4
1998–99	29	15 May 1999	Ljudski vrt	5,000	5–0	—	—	—	—	—
1999–2000	18	4 March 2000	Ljudski vrt	4,000	0–0	7	19 September 1999	Bežigrad	5,000	2–4
1999–2000	29	29 April 2000	Ljudski vrt	4,000	2–0	—	—	—	—	—
2000–01	11	1 October 2000	Ljudski vrt	8,000	1–3	22	31 March 2001	Bežigrad	4,500	1–1
2000–01	—	—	—	—	—	33	27 May 2001	Bežigrad	8,500	1–1
2001–02	10	30 September 2001	Ljudski vrt	5,500	3–2	21	24 February 2002	Bežigrad	5,000	0–1
2001–02	31	24 April 2002	Ljudski vrt	5,000	5–0	—	—	—	—	—
2002–03	14	2 November 2002	Ljudski vrt	5,000	0–3	3	26 July 2002	Bežigrad	5,000	0–1
2002–03	—	—	—	—	—	31	25 May 2003	Bežigrad	5,500	3–3
2003–04	12	18 October 2003	Ljudski vrt	4,000	0–0	1	20 July 2003	Ob Jezeru (N)	2,500	6–1
2003–04	31	23 May 2004	Ljudski vrt	7,000	0–0	26	24 April 2004	Bežigrad	3,500	1–2
2004–05	3	20 October 2004	Ljudski vrt	3,500	0–3	14	7 November 2004	Bežigrad	4,000	1–0

Note: Between 1998–99 and 2002–03, the league used a triple round-robin format.
• Total: Maribor 20 wins (49%), Olimpija 12 wins (29%), 9 draw (22%).

=== Yugoslav Cup ===
The head-to-head matches shows the results of Maribor and Olimpija, when they played in the Yugoslav Cup. The majority of the matches were played as part of the Slovenian Republic Cup and were used as qualifiers for the main event.

Season	Round	Date	Venue	Attendance	Host	Score	Winner
1963–64	Final (Note: Slovenian Republic Cup)	28 November 1963	Bežigrad	5,000	Olimpija	1–0	Olimpija
1966–67	Final	6 November 1966	Bežigrad	10,000	Olimpija	1–1 (0–5 pen.)	Maribor
1967–68	Final	12 November 1967	Bežigrad	8,000	Olimpija	1–2	Maribor
1968–69	Final	28 November 1968	Bežigrad	1,000	Olimpija	3–1	Olimpija
1969–70	Final	18 October 1969	Bežigrad	3,000	Olimpija	1–0	Olimpija
1970–71	Final	29 October 1970	Ljudski vrt	3,500	Maribor	0–0 (1–3 pen.)	Olimpija
1971–72	Final	28 October 1971	Bežigrad	3,000	Olimpija	4–1	Olimpija
1972–73	Final	6 December 1972	Ljudski vrt	3,500	Maribor	1–2	Olimpija
1977–78	Round of 32 (Note: Yugoslav Cup)	7 September 1977	Bežigrad	2,500	Olimpija	4–0	Olimpija
1979–80	Round of 32	17 October 1979	Ljudski vrt	4,000	Maribor	0–0 (5–4 pen.)	Maribor
1985–86	Final	4 September 1985	Bežigrad	1,000	Olimpija	0–1	Maribor
1987–88	Final	6 August 1987	Bežigrad	1,500	Olimpija	4–0	Olimpija
1988–89	Final	30 July 1988	Ljudski vrt	3,000	Maribor	0–0 (6–5 pen.)	Maribor

•Series won: Olimpija 8 (62%), Maribor 5 (38%).

=== Slovenian Cup ===
The head-to-head matches shows the results of Maribor and Olimpija.

Season	Round	Leg	Date	Venue	Attendance	Host	Score	Winner
1991–92	Final	—	24 June 1992	Bežigrad	2,000	Olimpija	0–0 (a.e.t.); 3–4 (pen.)	Maribor
1996–97	Semi-final	First	26 March 1997	Ljudski vrt	4,000	Maribor	2–2	Maribor
1996–97	Semi-final	Second	9 April 1997	Bežigrad	600	Olimpija	0–2	Maribor
1998–99	Final	First	26 May 1999	Bežigrad	2,000	Olimpija	2–3	Maribor
1998–99	Final	Second	16 June 1999	Ljudski vrt	6,500	Maribor	2–0	Maribor
2000–01	Quarter-final	First	18 October 2000	Ljudski vrt	4,500	Maribor	2–0	Olimpija
2000–01	Quarter-final	Second	25 October 2000	Bežigrad	3,000	Olimpija	3–0	Olimpija
2002–03	Quarter-final	First	2 October 2002	Bežigrad	5,200	Olimpija	0–0	Olimpija
2002–03	Quarter-final	Second	23 October 2002	Ljudski vrt	4,000	Maribor	3–4	Olimpija

• Series won: Maribor 3 (66.6%), Olimpija 2 (33.3%).

== Head-to-head ==
=== Statistics ===
The head-to-head statistics shows the results of NK Maribor and NK Olimpija.

	Maribor wins	Draws	Olimpija wins
Yugoslav League
At Maribor home	5	3	2
At Olimpija home	0	4	6
Neutral field	0	0	0
Total	5	7	8
Yugoslav Cup
At Maribor home	0	3	1
At Olimpija home	2	1	6
Neutral field	0	0	0
Total	2	4	7
1. SNL
At Maribor home	12	5	4
At Olimpija home	8	4	7
Neutral field	0	0	1
Total	20	9	12
Slovenian Cup
At Maribor home	2	1	1
At Olimpija home	2	2	1
Neutral field	0	0	0
Total	4	3	2
Total
83	31	23	29

=== League ranking ===
The head-to-head ranking table shows the results of NK Maribor and NK Olimpija, when they played in the same division.

Position	62–63^{1}	63–64^{1}	64–65^{1}	67–68	68–69	69–70	70–71	71–72	84–85^{1}	85–86^{2}	91–92	92–93	93–94	94–95	95–96	96–97	97–98	98–99	99–00	00–01	01–02	02–03	03–04	04–05
1			1							1	1	1	1	1		1	1	1	1	1	1	1		
2		2									2	2		2	2					2			2	
3	3		3							3			3									3	3	
4		4													4						4			
5																5	5							
6	6																	6						6
7							7												7					7
8																								
9								9																
10						10																		
11				11																				
12				12	12																			
13							13																	
14																								
15									15															
16					16	16			16															
17																								
18								18																
19																								
20																								
21																								

^{1}Second Yugoslav division; ^{2}Third Yugoslav division; • Total: Maribor 12 times higher (50%), Olimpija 12 times higher (50%).
