= 2000–01 Slovenian PrvaLiga =

Slovenian PrvaLiga
- Season: 2000–01
- Champions: Maribor (5th title)
- Relegated: Tabor Sežana; Dravograd
- Champions League: Maribor
- UEFA Cup: Olimpija; Gorica (cup winners)
- Intertoto Cup: Celje
- Matches played: 198
- Goals scored: 592 (2.99 per match)
- Top goalscorer: Damir Pekič (23 goals)
- Biggest home win: Olimpija 6–0 Tabor
- Biggest away win: Tabor 0–5 Primorje
- Highest scoring: Domžale 2–6 Rudar
- Longest winning run: 5 games Maribor
- Longest unbeaten run: 10 games Maribor
- Longest winless run: 8 games Tabor; Rudar
- Longest losing run: 6 games Dravograd
- Highest attendance: 8,000; Olimpija 1–1 Maribor
- Lowest attendance: 200; Rudar 2–0 Primorje
- Total attendance: 234,780
- Average attendance: 1,185

The 2000–01 Slovenian PrvaLiga season started on 21 July 2000 and ended on 27 May 2001. Each team played a total of 33 matches.

== League table ==
| Pos | Team | Pld | W | D | L | GF | GA | GD | Pts | Qualification or relegation |
|---|---|---|---|---|---|---|---|---|---|---|
| 1 | Maribor (C) | 33 | 18 | 8 | 7 | 61 | 36 | +25 | 62 | Qualification to Champions League second qualifying round |
| 2 | Olimpija | 33 | 18 | 6 | 9 | 73 | 46 | +27 | 60 | Qualification to UEFA Cup qualifying round |
| 3 | Primorje | 33 | 16 | 8 | 9 | 47 | 34 | +13 | 56 | |
| 4 | Mura | 33 | 14 | 9 | 10 | 43 | 39 | +4 | 51 | |
| 5 | Celje | 33 | 15 | 5 | 13 | 59 | 52 | +7 | 50 | Qualification to Intertoto Cup first round |
| 6 | Koper | 33 | 12 | 10 | 11 | 43 | 43 | 0 | 46 | |
| 7 | Gorica | 33 | 13 | 4 | 16 | 52 | 46 | +6 | 43 | Qualification to UEFA Cup qualifying round (Note: Gorica won the 2000–01 Slovenian Football Cup and qualified for the qualifying round of the UEFA Cup.) |
| 8 | Rudar Velenje | 33 | 12 | 7 | 14 | 43 | 44 | −1 | 43 | |
| 9 | Korotan Prevalje | 33 | 12 | 7 | 14 | 44 | 51 | −7 | 43 | |
| 10 | Domžale | 33 | 11 | 4 | 18 | 45 | 64 | −19 | 37 | |
| 11 | Dravograd (R) | 33 | 10 | 5 | 18 | 48 | 62 | −14 | 35 | Relegation to Slovenian Second League |
| 12 | Tabor Sežana (R) | 33 | 7 | 7 | 19 | 34 | 75 | −41 | 28 | Relegation to Slovenian Second League |

Source: PrvaLiga (in Slovene)
(C) Champions; (R) Relegated

== Results ==
=== Matches 1–22 ===
| Home \ Away | CEL | DOM | DRG | GOR | KOP | KPR | MAR | MUR | OLI | PRI | RUD | TAB |
|---|---|---|---|---|---|---|---|---|---|---|---|---|
| Celje | | 0–0 | 1–3 | 2–1 | 2–0 | 3–0 | 3–3 | 1–1 | 4–1 | 2–0 | 0–2 | 3–1 |
| Domžale | 2–3 | | 3–2 | 1–1 | 1–0 | 3–1 | 0–2 | 3–1 | 2–3 | 0–1 | 2–6 | 1–0 |
| Dravograd | 2–0 | 0–1 | | 1–0 | 0–3 | 2–0 | 1–1 | 3–1 | 2–3 | 3–1 | 2–0 | 1–2 |
| Gorica | 0–4 | 4–2 | 3–2 | | 2–0 | 4–1 | 0–2 | 3–0 | 5–0 | 0–1 | 1–0 | 2–1 |
| Koper | 0–0 | 3–0 | 3–2 | 2–2 | | 3–2 | 1–2 | 0–0 | 1–0 | 2–2 | 3–2 | 2–1 |
| Korotan Prevalje | 2–0 | 4–0 | 0–4 | 2–1 | 2–0 | | 2–4 | 0–0 | 3–2 | 1–1 | 0–1 | 4–0 |
| Maribor | 5–0 | 1–1 | 3–0 | 1–2 | 4–0 | 1–3 | | 2–1 | 1–3 | 2–1 | 1–0 | 3–0 |
| Mura | 4–2 | 2–0 | 1–1 | 0–1 | 1–0 | 0–0 | 1–1 | | 1–3 | 3–0 | 1–1 | 1–0 |
| Olimpija | 3–1 | 4–2 | 5–0 | 3–1 | 2–2 | 5–1 | 1–1 | 3–0 | | 1–0 | 1–1 | 5–1 |
| Primorje | 2–2 | 3–0 | 1–0 | 1–0 | 2–0 | 0–3 | 4–0 | 1–2 | 3–3 | | 2–1 | 1–1 |
| Rudar Velenje | 1–0 | 1–0 | 2–2 | 1–1 | 0–0 | 4–0 | 0–0 | 1–1 | 0–2 | 3–1 | | 3–2 |
| Tabor Sežana | 0–2 | 4–3 | 2–2 | 2–2 | 1–1 | 1–1 | 1–3 | 1–0 | 3–2 | 0–0 | 2–0 | |

Source: PrvaLiga (in Slovene)
Legend: Blue = home team win; Yellow = draw; Red = away team win.

=== Matches 23–33 ===
| Home \ Away | CEL | DOM | DRG | GOR | KOP | KPR | MAR | MUR | OLI | PRI | RUD | TAB |
|---|---|---|---|---|---|---|---|---|---|---|---|---|
| Celje | | 1–3 | 3–1 | | 5–1 | | 3–1 | 0–2 | | | 3–1 | |
| Domžale | | | | 1–0 | | 3–0 | | | 1–2 | | 4–1 | 3–1 |
| Dravograd | | 2–0 | | | 3–2 | 1–2 | | 1–3 | | | | 2–2 |
| Gorica | 2–1 | | 6–1 | | | 1–4 | | | 0–1 | 0–1 | | 4–0 |
| Koper | | 3–0 | | 3–2 | | | | 0–0 | 3–1 | | 2–0 | |
| Korotan Prevalje | 1–2 | | | | 0–0 | | 0–1 | | | 0–0 | | 1–0 |
| Maribor | | 1–1 | 1–0 | 2–1 | 2–0 | | | 4–1 | | | 4–1 | |
| Mura | | 4–2 | | 2–0 | | 3–1 | | | 2–0 | | 2–1 | |
| Olimpija | 4–0 | | 2–1 | | | 0–0 | 1–1 | | | 1–2 | | 6–0 |
| Primorje | 2–1 | 3–0 | 2–1 | | 0–0 | | 1–0 | 3–0 | | | | |
| Rudar Velenje | | | 3–0 | 1–0 | | 1–3 | | | 1–0 | 2–0 | | 1–2 |
| Tabor Sežana | 1–5 | | | | 0–3 | | 2–1 | 0–2 | | 0–5 | | |

Source: PrvaLiga (in Slovene)
Legend: Blue = home team win; Yellow = draw; Red = away team win.

== Top goalscorers ==
| Rank | Player | Club | Goals |
|---|---|---|---|
| 1 | (Slovenia) Damir Pekič | Maribor | 23 |
| 2 | (Slovenia) Sebastjan Cimirotič | Olimpija | 19 |
| 3 | (Slovenia) Ermin Rakovič | Olimpija | 16 |
| 4 | (Bosnia and Herzegovina) Goran Gutalj | Gorica | 15 |
| 5 | (Slovenia) Vanja Starčević | Primorje | 13 |
| 6 | (Slovenia) Slavko Komar | Domžale | 12 |
| 6 | (Slovenia) Saša Jakomin | Koper | 12 |
| 6 | (Slovenia) Anton Žlogar | Gorica | 12 |
| 9 | (Slovenia) Patrik Ipavec | Gorica | 11 |
| 10 | (Slovenia) Samo Vidovič | Dravograd | 10 |
| 10 | (Slovenia) Marko Vogrič | Primorje | 10 |

Source: PrvaLiga.si

== See also ==
- 2000–01 Slovenian Football Cup
- 2000–01 Slovenian Second League
