= 1985–86 Slovenian Republic League =

Slovenian Republic League
- Season: 1985–86
- Champions: Maribor
- Relegated: Ilirija; Aluminij
- Matches played: 182
- Goals scored: 510 (2.8 per match)

== Final table ==
Pos	Team	Pld	W	D	L	GF	GA	GD	Pts
1	Maribor	26	17	6	3	65	17	+48	40
2	Triglav Kranj	26	17	3	6	54	40	+14	37
3	Olimpija	26	16	4	6	46	21	+25	36
4	Slovan	26	11	11	4	42	20	+22	33
5	Rudar Trbovlje	26	11	7	8	44	37	+7	29
6	Mura	26	12	4	10	39	32	+7	28
7	Domžale	26	9	8	9	21	25	−4	26
8	Rudar Velenje	26	8	8	10	29	32	−3	24
9	Kovinar Maribor	26	6	11	9	31	43	−12	23
10	Vozila	26	6	10	10	32	42	−10	22
11	Železničar Maribor	26	8	5	13	31	45	−14	21
12	Kladivar Celje	26	5	9	12	29	44	−15	19
13	Ilirija	26	3	8	15	22	35	−13	14
14	Aluminij	26	3	6	17	25	67	−42	12
