= 1993–94 Slovenian PrvaLiga =

Slovenian PrvaLiga
- Season: 1993–94
- Champions: Olimpija (3rd title)
- Relegated: Krka; Slovan
- Cup Winners' Cup: Maribor
- UEFA Cup: Olimpija; Mura
- Matches played: 240
- Goals scored: 693 (2.89 per match)
- Top goalscorer: Štefan Škaper (23 goals)
- Biggest home win: Olimpija 11–0 Slovan
- Biggest away win: Krka 0–6 Olimpija
- Highest scoring: Olimpija 11–0 Slovan
- Longest winning run: 9 games Olimpija
- Longest unbeaten run: 17 games Olimpija
- Longest winless run: 13 games Krka
- Longest losing run: 7 games Krka
- Highest attendance: 5,000; Maribor 1–0 Beltinci
- Lowest attendance: 100; Slovan 1–1 Izola
- Total attendance: 262,300
- Average attendance: 1,092

The 1993–94 Slovenian PrvaLiga season started on 22 August 1993 and ended on 12 June 1994. Each team played a total of 30 matches.

== League table ==
Pos	Team	Pld	W	D	L	GF	GA	GD	Pts	Qualification or relegation
1	Olimpija (C)	30	23	5	2	95	20	+75	51	Qualification to UEFA Cup preliminary round
2	Mura	30	19	7	4	59	23	+36	45	Qualification to UEFA Cup preliminary round
3	Maribor	30	16	10	4	55	24	+31	42	Qualification to Cup Winners' Cup qualifying round
4	Celje	30	14	10	6	50	34	+16	38	
5	Gorica	30	12	11	7	40	38	+2	35	
6	Beltinci	30	13	6	11	57	40	+17	32	
7	Koper	30	11	10	9	43	38	+5	32	
8	Naklo	30	11	7	12	32	40	−8	29	
9	Rudar Velenje	30	10	7	13	37	49	−12	27	
10	Izola	30	9	8	13	45	51	−6	26	
11	Ljubljana	30	8	9	13	29	44	−15	25	
12	Primorje	30	8	8	14	46	55	−9	24	
13	Svoboda	30	9	5	16	31	59	−28	23	
14	Jadran Dekani	30	7	7	16	25	50	−25	21	
15	Slovan (R)	30	5	8	17	35	70	−35	18	Relegation to Slovenian Second League
16	Krka (R)	30	2	8	20	14	58	−44	12	Relegation to Slovenian Second League

Source: PrvaLiga (in Slovene)
(C) Champions; (R) Relegated

== Results ==
Home \ Away	BEL	CEL	GOR	IZO	JAD	KOP	KRK	LJU	MAR	MUR	NAK	OLI	PRI	RUD	SLO	SVO
Beltinci		2–2	1–1	6–2	0–0	4–1	3–0	4–0	0–0	1–2	2–1	0–4	7–1	2–0	3–1	6–0
Celje	2–0		3–0	3–1	1–1	2–1	3–0	3–0	2–2	0–4	3–0	3–0	3–0	4–0	4–3	3–2
Gorica	0–0	4–2		1–1	2–0	2–1	3–1	2–0	2–3	2–1	0–2	1–1	0–0	1–0	3–3	2–0
Izola	4–1	2–0	0–2		7–0	0–0	2–1	3–1	2–2	1–3	2–1	1–1	3–2	3–1	0–0	2–1
Jadran Dekani	1–1	0–2	0–0	1–0		3–1	2–1	1–1	0–2	0–2	1–0	1–2	1–0	2–0	0–2	3–0
Koper	5–0	0–0	0–1	0–0	1–0		5–0	3–2	2–1	2–2	2–0	0–0	3–1	2–2	2–1	3–0
Krka	0–3	1–2	0–0	4–1	1–0	0–1		0–0	1–1	0–2	0–2	0–6	1–1	0–1	1–1	0–1
Ljubljana	1–0	0–0	0–0	2–1	3–2	1–2	0–0		1–0	0–0	0–1	1–1	0–0	4–1	1–0	3–0
Maribor	1–0	3–0	4–2	2–0	3–0	2–0	1–1	3–2		0–0	3–0	3–1	4–0	2–0	4–0	0–1
Mura	2–1	0–0	3–1	3–2	2–0	1–1	5–0	4–0	1–1		2–0	1–2	2–0	2–0	4–0	2–1
Naklo	2–1	2–1	0–0	2–1	5–2	0–0	1–1	2–0	1–1	0–0		0–1	1–1	0–2	2–1	1–2
Olimpija	3–1	4–0	7–1	2–0	4–0	6–1	1–0	5–0	1–1	1–0	4–0		2–1	9–1	11–0	5–0
Primorje	1–3	0–0	4–2	5–1	4–2	2–0	2–0	2–1	1–2	0–1	2–2	1–2		3–0	4–4	6–1
Rudar Velenje	3–1	1–1	0–0	1–0	1–1	2–2	3–0	2–1	1–1	5–1	1–2	0–2	3–1		3–0	1–1
Slovan	0–2	1–1	0–3	1–1	0–0	2–1	3–0	1–1	2–1	2–5	1–2	0–3	4–1	0–2		2–3
Svoboda	1–2	0–0	1–2	2–2	2–1	1–1	2–0	1–3	0–2	0–2	3–0	2–5	0–0	1–0	2–0	

Source: PrvaLiga (in Slovene)
Legend: Blue = home team win; Yellow = draw; Red = away team win.

== Top goalscorers ==
Rank	Player	Club	Goals
1	(Slovenia) Štefan Škaper	Beltinci	23
2	(Slovenia) Ermin Šiljak	Svoboda/Olimpija	19
3	(Bosnia and Herzegovina) Nedeljko Topić	Olimpija	17
4	(Slovenia) Vlado Miloševič	Beltinci	16
5	(Slovenia) Primož Gliha	Mura	15
6	(Slovenia) Andrej Goršek	Celje	14
7	(Slovenia) Samir Zulič	Olimpija	13
7	(Slovenia) Željko Spasojevič	Rudar Velenje	13
7	(Albania) Kliton Bozgo	Maribor	13
7	(Bosnia and Herzegovina) Mirza Golubica	Celje	13

== See also ==
- 1993–94 Slovenian Football Cup
- 1993–94 Slovenian Second League
