= 1999–2000 Slovenian PrvaLiga =

Annual soccer tournament

Slovenian PrvaLiga
- Season: 1999–2000
- Champions: Maribor (4th title)
- Relegated: Beltinci; Pohorje
- Champions League: Maribor
- UEFA Cup: Gorica; Olimpija (cup winners)
- Intertoto Cup: Primorje
- Matches played: 198
- Goals scored: 613 (3.1 per match)
- Top goalscorer: Kliton Bozgo (24 goals)
- Biggest home win: Celje 7–0 Beltinci
- Biggest away win: Beltinci 0–6 Maribor
- Highest scoring: Pohorje 3–5 Korotan
- Longest winning run: 11 games Maribor
- Longest unbeaten run: 16 games Maribor
- Longest winless run: 20 games Beltinci
- Longest losing run: 8 games Beltinci
- Highest attendance: 6,000; Maribor 2–1 Rudar
- Lowest attendance: 150; Olimpija 3–1 Pohorje
- Total attendance: 190,200
- Average attendance: 960

The 1999–2000 Slovenian PrvaLiga season started on 1 August 1999 and ended on 20 May 2000. Each team played a total of 33 matches.

== League table ==
Pos	Team	Pld	W	D	L	GF	GA	GD	Pts	Qualification or relegation
1	Maribor (C)	33	25	6	2	90	30	+60	81	Qualification to Champions League second qualifying round
2	Gorica	33	19	5	9	55	34	+21	62	Qualification to UEFA Cup qualifying round
3	Rudar Velenje	33	17	7	9	49	35	+14	58	
4	Korotan Prevalje	33	15	7	11	58	43	+15	52	
5	Primorje	33	13	11	9	56	49	+7	50	Qualification to Intertoto Cup first round
6	Celje	33	11	14	8	53	45	+8	47	
7	Olimpija	33	14	4	15	64	58	+6	46	Qualification to UEFA Cup qualifying round (Note: Olimpija won the 1999–2000 Slovenian Football Cup and qualified for the qualifying round of the UEFA Cup.)
8	Dravograd	33	11	10	12	44	54	−10	43	
9	Domžale	33	11	8	14	50	51	−1	41	
10	Mura	33	10	6	17	47	53	−6	36	
11	Pohorje (R)	33	4	6	23	26	73	−47	18	Relegation to Slovenian Second League
12	Beltinci (R)	33	3	6	24	21	88	−67	15	Relegation to Slovenian Second League

Source: PrvaLiga (in Slovene)
(C) Champions; (R) Relegated

== Results ==
=== Matches 1–22 ===
Home \ Away	BEL	CEL	DOM	DRG	GOR	KPR	MAR	MUR	OLI	POH	PRI	RUD
Beltinci		0–0	1–1	1–1	0–0	1–3	0–2	0–3	0–5	1–0	0–5	1–2
Celje	2–0		3–0	0–0	3–3	2–1	1–2	3–2	3–0	1–1	3–1	0–0
Domžale	4–1	5–0		1–1	0–2	1–1	1–4	1–0	2–0	2–1	3–1	0–3
Dravograd	2–0	1–1	2–4		2–4	0–2	1–3	2–1	0–4	2–1	0–0	3–1
Gorica	2–0	1–0	2–0	1–1		2–0	2–1	2–1	2–1	5–0	5–0	0–1
Korotan Prevalje	2–1	1–1	2–2	1–2	0–1		2–4	1–1	3–2	4–0	3–1	1–0
Maribor	5–1	2–1	3–2	2–0	4–0	0–0		3–1	0–0	5–0	2–2	4–1
Mura	1–0	1–3	3–1	2–2	2–0	0–2	2–2		3–0	2–0	1–1	0–3
Olimpija	5–0	3–0	2–0	4–2	4–0	1–5	2–4	2–1		3–1	1–3	1–2
Pohorje	2–1	0–0	1–2	1–3	0–0	3–5	2–1	0–1	0–3		0–0	1–3
Primorje	2–2	2–2	5–1	1–0	1–0	2–2	1–3	1–0	6–0	1–0		2–1
Rudar Velenje	1–0	1–1	1–0	2–0	3–0	2–2	2–2	1–2	0–1	1–0	2–1	

Source: PrvaLiga (in Slovene)
Legend: Blue = home team win; Yellow = draw; Red = away team win.

=== Matches 23–33 ===
Home \ Away	BEL	CEL	DOM	DRG	GOR	KPR	MAR	MUR	OLI	POH	PRI	RUD
Beltinci			0–4		0–3		0–6			2–3	2–0	
Celje	7–0		0–0	2–2				2–1		5–1		
Domžale						3–2		0–0	1–2	6–1		0–0
Dravograd	2–0		2–1		1–1		0–3				2–4	
Gorica		4–0	2–0			2–1	1–3		3–0	1–0		
Korotan Prevalje	1–2	2–1		1–2				3–0			0–1	2–0
Maribor		4–0	1–0			3–0			2–0	3–1		2–1
Mura	6–0			2–3	1–2		1–3				2–1	
Olimpija	3–3	2–2		0–1		0–2		5–1				2–2
Pohorje				1–0		0–1		2–2	1–4			2–3
Primorje		2–2	2–2		2–1		2–2		3–2	0–0		
Rudar Velenje	2–0	0–2		1–1	2–1			2–1			3–0	

Source: PrvaLiga (in Slovene)
Legend: Blue = home team win; Yellow = draw; Red = away team win.

== Top goalscorers ==
Rank	Player	Club	Goals
1	(Albania) Kliton Bozgo	Maribor	24
2	(Slovenia) Oskar Drobne	Domžale/Gorica	23
3	(Slovenia) Uroš Barut	Primorje	17
4	(Slovenia) Marko Kmetec	Olimpija	16
5	(Slovenia) Aljoša Sivko	Dravograd	14
6	(Slovenia) Anton Žlogar	Gorica	13
7	(Slovenia) Andrej Goršek	Celje	12
8	(Slovenia) Dejan Djuranović	Maribor	11
8	(Slovenia) Vanja Starčević	Primorje	11
8	(Slovenia) Aleksander Radosavljević	Celje	11

== See also ==
- 1999–2000 Slovenian Football Cup
- 1999–2000 Slovenian Second League
