= Pavel Pinni =

Slovenian football manager

Personal information
- Date of birth: 5 December 1950 (age 75)

Managerial career
- Years: Team
- 2001–2006: Gorica
- 2007–2008: Celje
- 2008–2009: Primorje

Pavel Pinni (born 5 December 1950) is a Slovenian retired football manager.

== Career ==
Pinni started his managerial career with Slovenian side Gorica, helping them win three consecutive league titles between 2004 and 2006.
