= Gregor Blatnik =

Slovenian footballer

Personal information
- Date of birth: 15 December 1972 (age 53)
- Place of birth: SFR Yugoslavia
- Height: 1.82 m (6 ft 0 in)
- Position: Defender

Youth career
- –1991: Celje

Senior career*
Years	Team	Apps	(Gls)
1991–1995	Publikum Celje	107	(7)
1995–1996	Korotan Prevalje	31	(0)
1996–2001	Publikum Celje	136	(0)
2001–2002	Mura	1	(0)
2002–2003	Šmartno	4	(0)
Total		279	(7)

International career
1992	Slovenia U21	1	(0)
1993–1995	Slovenia	2	(0)
- * Club domestic league appearances and goals

Gregor Blatnik (born 15 December 1972) is a Slovenian retired international footballer who played as a defender. (Note: Gregor Blatnik at WorldFootball.net)

== Career ==
Blatnik was capped twice by the Slovenian national team, in friendly matches in 1993 and 1995.
