= Marko Vogrič =

Slovenian footballer

Personal information
- Date of birth: 26 June 1976 (age 50)
- Position: Forward

Senior career*
| Years | Team | Apps | (Gls) |
| 1993–1999 | Gorica | 66 | (7) |
| 1999 | Rudar Velenje | 11 | (0) |
| 2000–2004 | Primorje | 132 | (49) |
| 2004 | Ionikos | 4 | (0) |
| 2009–2010 | unknown | 22 | (14) |
| 2017 | Bilje | 1 | (0) |
- * Club domestic league appearances and goals

Marko Vogrič (born 26 June 1976) is a Slovenian retired football striker.
