= 2004–05 Slovenian PrvaLiga =

Slovenian PrvaLiga
- Season: 2004–05
- Champions: Gorica (3rd title)
- Relegated: Zagorje; Olimpija (excluded); Mura (excluded); Ljubljana (excluded)
- Champions League: Gorica
- UEFA Cup: Domžale; Celje (cup winners)
- Intertoto Cup: Drava
- Matches played: 192
- Goals scored: 470 (2.45 per match)
- Best Player: Saša Ranić
- Top goalscorer: Kliton Bozgo (18 goals)
- Best goalkeeper: Mitja Pirih
- Biggest home win: Gorica 6–0 Zagorje
- Biggest away win: Olimpija 0–6 Celje
- Highest scoring: Domžale 6–1 Ljubljana
- Longest winning run: 5 games Gorica
- Longest unbeaten run: 11 games Gorica
- Longest winless run: 21 games Zagorje
- Longest losing run: 8 games Koper
- Highest attendance: 4,000; Olimpija 1–0 Maribor
- Lowest attendance: 100; Ljubljana 0–0 Bela Krajina
- Total attendance: 156,414
- Average attendance: 818

The 2004–05 Slovenian PrvaLiga season started on 1 August 2004 and ended on 29 May 2005. Each team played a total of 32 matches.

== First stage ==
=== Table ===
Pos	Team	Pld	W	D	L	GF	GA	GD	Pts	Qualification
1	Gorica	22	14	5	3	39	20	+19	47	Qualification to championship group
2	Celje	22	11	4	7	33	18	+15	37	Qualification to championship group
3	Primorje	22	10	5	7	28	20	+8	35	Qualification to championship group
4	Olimpija	22	10	5	7	28	26	+2	35	Qualification to championship group
5	Domžale	22	9	6	7	33	27	+6	33	Qualification to championship group
6	Drava Ptuj	22	9	5	8	27	27	0	32	Qualification to championship group
7	Maribor	22	9	5	8	30	27	+3	32	Qualification to relegation group
8	Ljubljana	22	7	8	7	30	32	−2	29	Qualification to relegation group
9	Mura	22	7	7	8	31	28	+3	28	Qualification to relegation group
10	Bela Krajina	22	5	6	11	20	39	−19	21	Qualification to relegation group
11	Koper	22	4	7	11	20	30	−10	19	Qualification to relegation group
12	Zagorje	22	2	7	13	11	36	−25	13	Qualification to relegation group

Source: PrvaLiga (in Slovene)
Rules for classification: 1) points; 2) head-to-head points; 3) head-to-head goal difference; 4) head-to-head goals scored; 5) goal difference; 6) number of goals scored.

=== Results ===
Home \ Away	BKR	CEL	DOM	DRA	GOR	KOP	LJU	MAR	MUR	OLI	PRI	ZAG
Bela Krajina		2–1	1–2	2–3	0–1	1–4	1–1	1–2	2–2	1–0	1–0	1–0
Celje	2–0		2–3	0–1	1–1	3–0	3–0	2–2	2–0	4–1	2–0	2–0
Domžale	3–1	2–0		3–2	1–2	1–1	6–1	2–1	0–0	0–1	1–2	0–0
Drava Ptuj	0–1	1–0	0–1		2–2	3–2	2–4	2–0	2–0	0–0	0–2	2–1
Gorica	1–1	0–1	2–0	1–2		2–0	0–0	2–1	2–0	2–0	0–0	6–0
Koper	1–1	0–1	0–2	0–0	0–2		2–2	1–3	0–0	1–1	1–0	3–0
Ljubljana	1–1	0–2	1–1	1–1	4–0	2–0		1–2	1–4	0–1	3–0	2–0
Maribor	5–0	2–0	1–1	2–1	1–2	0–0	0–2		1–1	0–3	1–0	2–0
Mura	3–1	0–0	2–0	3–1	1–2	1–3	1–2	2–3		1–1	2–2	2–0
Olimpija	2–0	1–4	1–1	2–1	2–3	2–0	4–1	1–0	0–2		2–1	1–0
Primorje	4–0	1–0	3–1	0–0	2–3	2–1	0–0	3–1	3–1	2–0		0–0
Zagorje	1–1	1–1	3–2	0–1	1–3	1–0	1–1	0–0	0–3	2–2	0–1	

Source: PrvaLiga (in Slovene)
Legend: Blue = home team win; Yellow = draw; Red = away team win.

== Second stage ==
=== Championship group ===
==== Table ====
Pos	Team	Pld	W	D	L	GF	GA	GD	Pts	Qualification
1	Gorica (C)	32	18	11	3	49	23	+26	65	Qualification to Champions League first qualifying round
2	Domžale	32	14	10	8	48	36	+12	52	Qualification to UEFA Cup first qualifying round
3	Celje	32	16	4	12	47	28	+19	52	Qualification to UEFA Cup second qualifying round (Note: Celje won the 2004–05 Slovenian Football Cup and qualified for the second qualifying round of the UEFA Cup.)
4	Primorje	32	12	10	10	37	30	+7	46	
5	Drava Ptuj	32	12	10	10	40	36	+4	46	Qualification to Intertoto Cup first round
6	Olimpija (D, R)	32	10	7	15	34	52	−18	37	Excluded from the league (Note: Olimpija were dissolved during the season due to the financial problems, and then were excluded from the league.)

Source: PrvaLiga (in Slovene)
Rules for classification: 1) points; 2) head-to-head points; 3) head-to-head goal difference; 4) head-to-head goals scored; 5) goal difference; 6) number of goals scored.
(C) Champions; (D) Disqualified; (R) Relegated

==== Results ====
Home \ Away	CEL	DOM	DRA	GOR	OLI	PRI
Celje		3–1	1–2	0–1	2–1	1–0
Domžale	1–0		3–3	1–1	3–0	1–1
Drava Ptuj	0–1	0–1		0–0	4–1	1–1
Gorica	2–0	0–0	0–0		2–0	1–1
Olimpija	0–6	1–3	0–2	1–1		2–3
Primorje	2–0	0–1	1–1	0–2	0–0	

Source: PrvaLiga (in Slovene)
Legend: Blue = home team win; Yellow = draw; Red = away team win.

=== Relegation group ===
==== Table ====
Pos	Team	Pld	W	D	L	GF	GA	GD	Pts	Relegation
7	Maribor	32	15	6	11	47	36	+11	51	
8	Mura (D, R)	32	11	11	10	43	39	+4	44	Excluded from the league (Note: Mura and Ljubljana were dissolved during the season due to the financial problems, and then were excluded from the league.)
9	Ljubljana (D, R)	32	10	12	10	38	43	−5	42	Excluded from the league
10	Bela Krajina	32	9	10	13	31	44	−13	37	
11	Koper	32	9	9	14	38	41	−3	36	
12	Zagorje (R)	32	2	8	22	18	62	−44	14	Relegation to Slovenian Second League

Source: PrvaLiga (in Slovene)
Rules for classification: 1) points; 2) head-to-head points; 3) head-to-head goal difference; 4) head-to-head goals scored; 5) goal difference; 6) number of goals scored.
(D) Disqualified; (R) Relegated

==== Results ====
Home \ Away	BKR	KOP	LJU	MAR	MUR	ZAG
Bela Krajina		1–0	3–0	3–0	1–1	0–0
Koper	1–0		1–1	3–1	0–2	5–0
Ljubljana	0–0	0–1		1–0	0–0	2–1
Maribor	2–0	1–1	3–0		2–0	3–0
Mura	0–0	3–2	1–1	1–3		2–1
Zagorje	1–3	2–4	1–3	0–2	1–2	

Source: PrvaLiga (in Slovene)
Legend: Blue = home team win; Yellow = draw; Red = away team win.

== Top goalscorers ==
Rank	Player	Club	Goals
1	(Albania) Kliton Bozgo	Maribor	18
2	(Slovenia) Saša Ranić	Gorica	14
3	(Slovenia) Darko Djukić	Koper	13
3	(Bosnia and Herzegovina) Sead Zilić	Drava Ptuj	13
5	(Slovenia) Dalibor Stevanović	Domžale	11
6	(Slovenia) Sebastjan Cimirotič	Celje/Olimpija	10
6	(Slovenia) Slaviša Dvorančič	Domžale	10
6	(Slovenia) Dražen Žeželj	Primorje	10
6	(Slovenia) Ermin Rakovič	Mura	10
6	(Nigeria) Abdulrazak Ekpoki	Ljubljana	10

Source: PrvaLiga.si

== See also ==
- 2004–05 Slovenian Football Cup
- 2004–05 Slovenian Second League
