= 2002–03 Slovenian PrvaLiga =

Slovenian PrvaLiga
- Season: 2002–03
- Dates: 12 July 2002 – 1 June 2003
- Champions: Maribor (7th title)
- Relegated: Rudar Velenje; Korotan (excluded)
- Champions League: Maribor
- UEFA Cup: Celje; Olimpija (cup winners)
- Intertoto Cup: Koper
- Matches played: 185
- Goals scored: 525 (2.84 per match)
- Top goalscorer: Marko Kmetec (22 goals)
- Biggest home win: Mura 5–0 Gorica; Primorje 5–0 Ljubljana; Maribor 5–0 Dravograd
- Biggest away win: Korotan 0–5 Celje; Ljubljana 1–6 Maribor
- Highest scoring: Šmartno 5–5 Maribor
- Longest winning run: 8 games Celje, Maribor
- Longest unbeaten run: 16 games Celje
- Longest winless run: 13 games Rudar Velenje
- Highest attendance: 9,000; Maribor 2–1 Celje
- Total attendance: 230,300
- Average attendance: 1,244

The 2002–03 Slovenian PrvaLiga season started on 14 July 2002 and ended on 1 June 2003.

== League table ==
Pos	Team	Pld	W	D	L	GF	GA	GD	Pts	Qualification or relegation
1	Maribor (C)	31	18	8	5	57	32	+25	62	Qualification to Champions League second qualifying round
2	Celje	31	15	10	6	57	38	+19	55	Qualification to UEFA Cup qualifying round (Note: Olimpija won the 2002–03 Slovenian Football Cup and qualified for the qualifying round of the UEFA Cup.)
3	Olimpija	31	14	12	5	54	32	+22	54	Qualification to UEFA Cup qualifying round
4	Šmartno	31	12	10	9	46	42	+4	46	
5	Koper	31	12	9	10	41	41	0	45	Qualification to Intertoto Cup first round
6	Primorje	31	13	5	13	47	44	+3	44	
7	Dravograd	31	9	9	13	40	43	−3	36	
8	Gorica	31	7	13	11	34	43	−9	34	
9	Mura	31	9	7	15	38	48	−10	34	
10	Ljubljana (Note: 3 points deducted)	31	9	6	16	41	66	−25	30	
11	Rudar Velenje (R)	31	6	7	18	32	51	−19	25	Relegation to Slovenian Second League
12	Korotan Prevalje (Note: 7 points deducted) (D)	11	2	4	5	7	14	−7	3	Excluded from the league (Note: Korotan Prevalje were excluded from the league in March 2003 for failing to appear in two matches. Only their matches from the 1st to the 11th round were taken into account.)

Source: RSSSF, 24ur.com
(C) Champions; (D) Disqualified; (R) Relegated

== Results ==
=== Matches 1–22 ===
Note: The table below lists all the results of the completed matches; however, all matches involving Korotan after the eleventh round were later annulled and do not count towards the final league standings.

Home \ Away	CEL	DRG	GOR	KOP	KPR	LJU	MAR	MUR	OLI	PRI	RUD	ŠMA
Celje		2–1	2–2	3–3	0–0	3–1	3–3	4–0	0–0	3–1	4–1	3–0
Dravograd	0–1		0–0	3–4		1–0	0–0	2–1	1–1	4–0	2–0	0–0
Gorica	0–2	0–0		3–0	2–1	1–1	0–2	1–1	3–4	0–1	1–1	1–2
Koper	0–0	3–2	3–0		3–0	2–1	1–2	1–0	0–0	3–0	1–0	0–1
Korotan Prevalje	0–5	2–1	2–3	0–1		1–1	0–1	2–0	0–3	0–1	0–0	3–0
Ljubljana	1–1	1–4	0–2	2–1	2–0		0–2	3–1	0–1	0–4	3–1	4–1
Maribor	0–3	2–1	2–3	0–1	3–0	0–2		0–0	0–3	2–0	1–0	0–0
Mura	1–2	3–2	5–0	1–1	3–2	1–2	0–0		0–1	3–0	1–0	0–3
Olimpija	1–0	3–0	1–1	3–0	4–0	2–2	0–1	3–1		1–3	1–2	2–2
Primorje	1–3	1–0	1–1	1–1	0–3	5–0	1–1	3–3	1–3		1–0	4–0
Rudar Velenje	2–1	0–1	1–1	2–1	3–1	3–0	1–2	1–1	1–2	3–1		1–3
Šmartno	1–2	1–1	1–0	1–1	1–1	2–2	5–5	1–0	0–0	1–0	3–1	

Source: PrvaLiga (in Slovene)
Legend: Blue = home team win; Yellow = draw; Red = away team win.

=== Matches 23–33 ===
Home \ Away	CEL	DRG	GOR	KOP	LJU	MAR	MUR	OLI	PRI	RUD	ŠMA
Celje		1–0	0–0	3–3			3–0	1–3	2–1		
Dravograd			4–1		2–2		2–1			3–1	
Gorica				3–0	2–0		1–1	1–2	3–3		
Koper		2–2			3–0			2–2		2–1	1–0
Ljubljana	4–1					1–6				2–1	1–2
Maribor	2–1	5–0	2–0	1–0			4–2		2–0		
Mura				2–0	4–2			1–0	2–1	1–0	
Olimpija		1–1			5–1	3–3				1–1	1–1
Primorje		1–0		2–0	1–2			2–0		4–0	
Rudar Velenje	2–2		0–0			1–2					4–3
Šmartno	4–1	3–0	0–1			0–2	3–1		1–2		

Source: PrvaLiga (in Slovene)
Legend: Blue = home team win; Yellow = draw; Red = away team win.

== Top goalscorers ==
Rank	Player	Club	Goals
1	(Slovenia) Marko Kmetec	Ljubljana/Olimpija	22
2	(Slovenia) Marko Vogrič	Primorje	17
3	(Slovenia) Ramiz Smajlović	Šmartno	15
4	(Slovenia) Dražen Žeželj	Ljubljana	14
5	(Slovenia) Marjan Dominko	Mura	13
5	(Slovenia) Ermin Rakovič	Maribor	13
5	(Slovenia) Matej Rebol	Dravograd	13
8	(Slovenia) Oskar Drobne	Dravograd	12
8	(Slovenia) Alen Mujanović	Rudar Velenje	12
8	(Slovenia) Damir Pekič	Maribor	12

Source: PrvaLiga.si

== See also ==
- 2002–03 Slovenian Football Cup
- 2002–03 Slovenian Second League
