= 1998–99 Slovenian PrvaLiga =

Slovenian PrvaLiga
- Season: 1998–99
- Champions: Maribor (3rd title)
- Relegated: Triglav; Koper
- Champions League: Maribor
- UEFA Cup: Gorica; Olimpija (cup finalist)
- Intertoto Cup: Rudar; Korotan
- Matches played: 198
- Goals scored: 533 (2.69 per match)
- Top goalscorer: Novica Nikčević (17 goals)
- Biggest home win: Mura 6–0 Domžale; Olimpija 6–0 Beltinci
- Biggest away win: Koper 0–4 Domžale
- Highest scoring: Mura 6–2 Koper
- Longest winning run: 5 games Maribor
- Longest unbeaten run: 13 games Rudar
- Longest winless run: 9 games Celje
- Longest losing run: 4 games Domžale; Olimpija; Primorje
- Highest attendance: 8,000; Maribor 2–0 Gorica
- Lowest attendance: 200; Celje 0–1 Koper
- Total attendance: 258,450
- Average attendance: 1,305

The 1998–99 Slovenian PrvaLiga season started on 2 August 1998 and ended on 13 June 1999. Each team played a total of 33 matches.

== League table ==
Pos	Team	Pld	W	D	L	GF	GA	GD	Pts	Qualification or relegation
1	Maribor (C)	33	19	9	5	72	29	+43	66	Qualification to Champions League second qualifying round
2	Gorica	33	18	8	7	55	31	+24	62	Qualification to UEFA Cup qualifying round
3	Rudar Velenje	33	16	8	9	43	33	+10	56	Qualification to Intertoto Cup first round
4	Mura	33	16	5	12	53	35	+18	53	
5	Korotan Prevalje	33	14	6	13	44	45	−1	48	Qualification to Intertoto Cup first round
6	Olimpija	33	12	8	13	54	50	+4	44	Qualification to UEFA Cup qualifying round (Note: Olimpija lost to Maribor in the final of 1998–99 Slovenian Football Cup competition; since Maribor have qualified for the Champions League, Olimpija were entered the qualifying round of UEFA Cup.)
7	Celje	33	10	12	11	30	35	−5	42	
8	Domžale	33	10	11	12	40	49	−9	41	
9	Primorje	33	11	7	15	39	45	−6	40	
10	Beltinci	33	10	6	17	41	62	−21	36	
11	Koper (R)	33	8	8	17	34	61	−27	32	Relegation to Slovenian Second League
12	Triglav Kranj (R)	33	5	10	18	28	58	−30	25	Relegation to Slovenian Second League

Source: PrvaLiga (in Slovene)
(C) Champions; (R) Relegated

== Results ==
=== Matches 1–22 ===
Home \ Away	BEL	CEL	DOM	GOR	KOP	KPR	MAR	MUR	OLI	PRI	RUD	TRI
Beltinci		4–1	2–0	2–2	2–2	2–1	1–2	2–0	2–0	1–1	0–2	4–1
Celje	0–1		0–0	2–1	0–1	1–1	0–0	0–1	0–2	3–0	0–0	1–0
Domžale	3–0	2–2		1–1	4–0	1–3	2–2	0–1	0–3	3–1	0–1	0–0
Gorica	3–1	3–0	3–0		3–1	1–0	2–5	3–1	4–1	2–1	2–1	3–1
Koper	0–1	1–1	3–1	2–3		0–1	2–1	0–3	1–1	0–2	1–0	0–2
Korotan Prevalje	5–0	1–1	0–1	0–0	3–0		1–4	1–1	2–1	2–1	1–1	1–0
Maribor	5–1	2–2	4–0	1–0	2–2	3–0		4–1	3–1	1–1	1–0	3–2
Mura	3–0	0–1	6–0	0–1	6–2	4–0	1–0		0–0	2–1	0–0	4–0
Olimpija	1–0	3–0	5–0	2–1	2–3	3–4	1–4	0–1		1–0	0–0	1–1
Primorje	2–1	0–0	0–0	0–2	0–1	3–2	0–1	2–1	3–0		2–0	5–1
Rudar Velenje	2–0	0–0	1–3	3–0	2–1	2–0	2–0	2–2	1–2	4–1		1–0
Triglav Kranj	2–0	1–0	1–0	0–2	1–1	1–2	2–2	0–0	2–2	0–0	0–1	

Source: PrvaLiga (in Slovene)
Legend: Blue = home team win; Yellow = draw; Red = away team win.

=== Matches 23–33 ===
Home \ Away	BEL	CEL	DOM	GOR	KOP	KPR	MAR	MUR	OLI	PRI	RUD	TRI
Beltinci		0–1	3–3		2–2					0–2		5–1
Celje					1–0	1–0	0–0	3–1				2–2
Domžale		2–1		0–0					2–2	4–1	0–1	
Gorica	3–0	0–1				3–0		4–1		1–1		0–0
Koper			0–4	0–0					3–3	0–1	0–2	
Korotan Prevalje	2–0		0–0		1–2		1–0	1–2	0–3			
Maribor	1–1		1–1	2–0	5–0				5–0		3–0	
Mura	1–2		1–2		1–0		0–2		2–0		4–0	
Olimpija	6–0	2–3		0–1						1–0	1–1	4–1
Primorje		2–1				1–4	1–0	0–1				1–1
Rudar Velenje	2–1	2–1		1–1		1–2				4–3		3–1
Triglav Kranj			0–1		0–3	1–2	1–3	2–1				

Source: PrvaLiga (in Slovene)
Legend: Blue = home team win; Yellow = draw; Red = away team win.

== Top goalscorers ==
Rank	Player	Club	Goals
1	(Slovenia) Novica Nikčević	Gorica	17
2	(Albania) Kliton Bozgo	Maribor	15
2	(Ghana) Issah Moro	Beltinci	15
4	(Federal Republic of Yugoslavia) Živojin Vidojević	Rudar Velenje	12
4	(Croatia) Dalibor Filipović	Maribor	12
6	(Slovenia) Dean Baranja	Mura	10
6	(Slovenia) Ivica Vulič	Primorje	10
8	(Slovenia) Janez Mrak	Domžale	9
8	(Slovenia) Saša Jakomin	Koper	9
8	(Bosnia and Herzegovina) Goran Gutalj	Mura	9

== See also ==
- 1998–99 Slovenian Football Cup
- 1998–99 Slovenian Second League
