= 2001–02 Slovenian PrvaLiga =

Slovenian PrvaLiga
- Season: 2001–02
- Dates: 21 July 2001 – 5 May 2002
- Champions: Maribor (6th title)
- Relegated: Domžale; Triglav Kranj
- Champions League: Maribor
- UEFA Cup: Primorje; Gorica (cup winners)
- Intertoto Cup: Koper
- Matches played: 198
- Goals scored: 504 (2.55 per match)
- Top goalscorer: Romano Obilinović (16 goals)
- Biggest home win: Maribor 7–0 Gorica
- Biggest away win: Domžale 1–5 Šmartno; Triglav 0–4 Celje
- Highest scoring: Maribor 6–2 Triglav; Maribor 7–1 Triglav
- Longest winning run: 6 games Primorje, Gorica
- Longest unbeaten run: 14 games Maribor
- Longest winless run: 14 games Domžale
- Longest losing run: 9 games Domžale
- Highest attendance: 9,000; Maribor 3–0 Primorje
- Lowest attendance: 200; Gorica 1–3 Celje
- Total attendance: 230,150
- Average attendance: 1,162

The 2001–02 Slovenian PrvaLiga season started on 21 July 2001 and ended on 5 May 2002.

== League table ==
Pos	Team	Pld	W	D	L	GF	GA	GD	Pts	Qualification or relegation
1	Maribor (C)	33	19	9	5	64	23	+41	66	Qualification to Champions League second qualifying round
2	Primorje	33	18	6	9	57	26	+31	60	Qualification to UEFA Cup qualifying round
3	Koper	33	15	11	7	45	26	+19	56	Qualification to Intertoto Cup first round
4	Gorica	33	14	9	10	38	40	−2	51	Qualification to UEFA Cup qualifying round (Note: Gorica won the 2001–02 Slovenian Football Cup and qualified for the qualifying round of the UEFA Cup.)
5	Olimpija	33	15	6	12	39	42	−3	51	
6	Celje	33	14	6	13	50	39	+11	48	
7	Mura	33	14	6	13	36	35	+1	48	
8	Rudar Velenje	33	11	9	13	46	52	−6	42	
9	Šmartno	33	9	13	11	41	40	+1	40	
10	Korotan Prevalje	33	10	7	16	28	46	−18	37	
11	Triglav Kranj (R)	33	9	5	19	34	60	−26	32	Relegation to Slovenian Second League
12	Domžale (R)	33	3	7	23	26	75	−49	16	Relegation to Slovenian Second League

Source: PrvaLiga (in Slovene)
(C) Champions; (R) Relegated

== Results ==
=== Matches 1–22 ===
Home \ Away	CEL	DOM	GOR	KOP	KPR	MAR	MUR	OLI	PRI	RUD	ŠMA	TRI
Celje		3–3	1–0	0–0	2–0	0–1	2–0	2–0	1–3	3–2	3–4	2–2
Domžale	1–1		1–2	1–2	1–4	0–2	1–2	1–2	0–0	2–2	1–5	1–0
Gorica	1–3	0–0		1–1	1–0	1–0	0–0	1–3	0–0	0–2	0–0	4–3
Koper	1–0	4–0	2–0		2–0	3–0	4–1	1–0	1–0	2–2	3–1	1–1
Korotan Prevalje	2–0	0–1	3–1	1–0		0–2	0–3	1–1	1–2	1–2	1–2	1–0
Maribor	2–0	1–1	1–1	1–0	6–1		0–1	3–2	1–1	2–1	1–2	6–2
Mura	1–0	3–1	0–2	1–0	0–0	1–0		2–2	1–0	0–0	0–3	2–0
Olimpija	1–0	2–0	2–1	0–0	1–1	0–1	1–0		1–3	1–0	1–1	4–0
Primorje	1–0	6–0	0–2	2–1	2–0	1–2	2–0	3–0		6–0	1–1	1–0
Rudar Velenje	3–4	2–1	0–2	3–2	0–0	1–2	0–0	2–0	3–0		1–1	3–1
Šmartno	1–1	6–1	0–0	1–1	0–1	0–0	3–2	1–2	0–1	1–1		0–1
Triglav Kranj	0–4	1–1	2–0	0–2	2–0	1–1	3–1	0–1	2–0	0–3	1–2	

Source: PrvaLiga (in Slovene)
Legend: Blue = home team win; Yellow = draw; Red = away team win.

=== Matches 23–33 ===
Home \ Away	CEL	DOM	GOR	KOP	KPR	MAR	MUR	OLI	PRI	RUD	ŠMA	TRI
Celje		2–1		2–0	5–1	1–2					4–0	
Domžale			2–3	1–3		0–2					1–0	1–2
Gorica	0–0						3–1	2–1	3–1			2–1
Koper			0–0			1–1	2–1	0–0		3–1		1–0
Korotan Prevalje		1–0	0–2	1–1		0–0					1–0	
Maribor			7–0				2–0	5–0	3–0	0–0		7–1
Mura	2–0	2–0			0–1			4–0	0–2	1–0		
Olimpija	1–0	3–0			2–0				0–3	1–3	3–1	
Primorje	1–2	5–0		2–0	1–1					4–0	3–0	
Rudar Velenje	0–1	2–1	3–2		2–3							1–4
Šmartno			0–1	1–1		0–0	1–1			1–1		2–0
Triglav Kranj	2–1	1–1			2–1		0–3	0–1	0–0			

Source: PrvaLiga (in Slovene)
Legend: Blue = home team win; Yellow = draw; Red = away team win.

== Top goalscorers ==
Rank	Player	Club	Goals
1	(Croatia) Romano Obilinović	Primorje	16
2	(Bosnia and Herzegovina) Samir Duro	Maribor	15
3	(Slovenia) Damir Pekič	Maribor	14
4	(Slovenia) Senad Tiganj	Olimpija	12
4	(Bosnia and Herzegovina) Jovica Vico	Šmartno	12
4	(Slovenia) Anton Žlogar	Olimpija	12
7	(Slovenia) Simon Gregorič	Primorje	11
7	(Slovenia) Andrej Kvas	Celje/Maribor	11
7	(Slovenia) Ramiz Smajlović	Šmartno	11
7	(Hungary) Barnabas Sztipanovics	Maribor	11

Source: PrvaLiga.si

== See also ==
- 2001–02 Slovenian Football Cup
- 2001–02 Slovenian Second League
