= 2012–13 Slovenian PrvaLiga =

Slovenian PrvaLiga
- Season: 2012–13
- Dates: 14 July 2012 – 26 May 2013
- Champions: Maribor (11th title)
- Relegated: Mura 05; Aluminij
- Champions League: Maribor
- Europa League: Olimpija; Domžale; Celje (cup finalists)
- Matches: 180
- Goals: 487 (2.71 per match)
- Best player: Agim Ibraimi
- Top goalscorer: Marcos Tavares (17 goals)
- Biggest home win: Maribor 5–1 Celje
- Biggest away win: Gorica 1–6 Maribor
- Highest scoring: Aluminij 3–5 Rudar
- Longest winning run: 7 games Maribor
- Longest unbeaten run: 12 games Maribor
- Longest winless run: 11 games Aluminij
- Longest losing run: 6 games Mura 05
- Highest attendance: 9,000; Maribor 1–0 Olimpija
- Lowest attendance: 0^{[A]} Mura 05 3–0 Koper
- Total attendance: 158,530
- Average attendance: 880

The 2012–13 Slovenian PrvaLiga was the 22nd edition of the Slovenian PrvaLiga since its establishment in 1991. Also known by the abbreviation 1. SNL, PrvaLiga was contested by the top ten clubs in Slovenia, for the title of national champions. The fixture schedule was released on 26 June 2012. The season began on 14 July 2012 and ended on 26 May 2013.

Maribor were the defending champions, having won their 10th league title the previous season. The season featured nine teams from the 2011–12 Slovenian PrvaLiga and one team from the 2011–12 Slovenian Second League, Aluminij, who was promoted directly as the winners of the second division, replacing Nafta. This was the first season for Aluminij in the top division.

== Teams ==
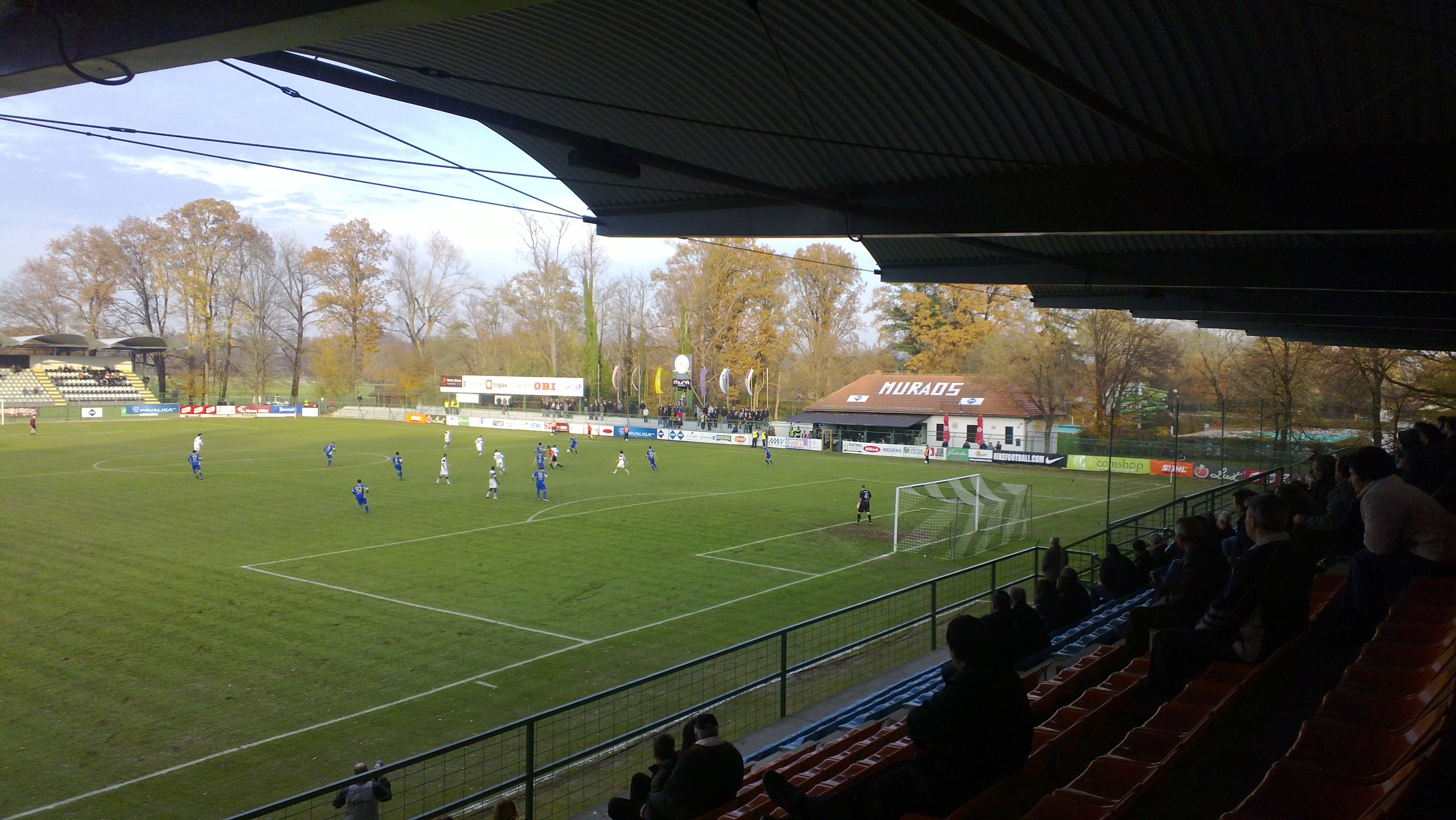
Mura 05 and Domžale at Fazenarija stadium on 8 November 2012.

A total of ten teams contested the league, including nine from the 2011–12 Slovenian PrvaLiga and one promoted from the 2011–12 Slovenian Second League. Aluminij secured direct promotion as champions of the Slovenian Second League. They replaced Nafta Lendava in the top division, who finished at the bottom of the PrvaLiga table, ending their seven-season tenure in the top division. This was the first season for Aluminij in the Slovenian PrvaLiga. Even though Dob won the relegation play-offs against Triglav Kranj, they declined promotion to the top division because of financial reasons; as a result, Triglav was not relegated and remained in the PrvaLiga for the 2012–13 season.

=== Stadiums and locations ===
Location of teams in the 2012–13 Slovenian PrvaLiga

Team	Location	Stadium	Capacity^{1}
Aluminij	Kidričevo	Sports Park	600
Celje	Celje	Arena Petrol	13,059
Domžale	Domžale	Sports Park	3,100
Gorica	Nova Gorica	Sports Park	3,100
Koper	Koper	Bonifika	4,047
Maribor	Maribor	Ljudski vrt	12,702
Mura 05	Murska Sobota	Fazanerija	3,782
Olimpija	Ljubljana	Stožice	16,038
Rudar	Velenje	Ob Jezeru	1,864
Triglav	Kranj	Stanko Mlakar	2,060

^{1}Seating capacity only. Some stadiums (e.g. Aluminij, Mura 05, Rudar) also have standing areas.

== League table ==
Pos	Team	Pld	W	D	L	GF	GA	GD	Pts	Qualification or relegation
1	Maribor (C)	36	24	6	6	80	35	+45	78	Qualification to Champions League second qualifying round
2	Olimpija	36	21	7	8	73	35	+38	70	Qualification to Europa League second qualifying round
3	Domžale	36	17	9	10	42	34	+8	60	Qualification to Europa League first qualifying round
4	Koper	36	14	13	9	52	42	+10	55	
5	Celje	36	12	13	11	39	39	0	49	Qualification to Europa League first qualifying round (Note: Maribor won the 2012–13 Slovenian Football Cup, so the cup-winner spot in 2013–14 UEFA Europa League second qualifying round passed to the 2nd-placed Olimpija Ljubljana, and Celje took the first qualifying round spot as cup runners-up.)
6	Gorica	36	10	11	15	45	60	−15	41	
7	Rudar	36	11	7	18	42	59	−17	40	
8	Triglav Kranj	36	9	11	16	35	50	−15	38	
9	Mura 05 (R)	36	9	6	21	43	66	−23	33	Relegation play-offs cancelled
10	Aluminij (R)	36	7	9	20	36	67	−31	30	Relegation to Slovenian Second League

Source: Slovenian PrvaLiga (in Slovene)
Rules for classification: 1) points; 2) goal difference; 3) number of goals scored.
(C) Champions; (R) Relegated

=== Positions by round ===
Team ╲ Round	1	2	3	4	5	6	7	8	9	10	11	12	13	14	15	16	17	18	19	20	21	22	23	24	25	26	27	28	29	30	31	32	33	34	35	36
Maribor	2	3	1	1	1	1	1	1	1	1	1	1	1	1	1	1	1	1	1	1	1	1	1	1	1	1	1	1	1	1	1	1	1	1	1	1
Olimpija	7	4	7	5	5	7	7	6	5	3	2	2	2	2	2	2	2	2	2	2	2	2	2	2	2	2	2	2	2	2	2	2	2	2	2	2
Domžale	3	6	4	6	4	5	3	2	4	5	5	3	3	3	3	3	4	4	4	4	3	3	3	3	3	3	3	3	3	3	4	4	4	4	3	3
Koper	1	2	5	2	2	3	2	4	2	2	3	4	6	5	4	4	3	3	3	3	4	4	4	4	4	4	4	4	4	4	3	3	3	3	4	4
Celje	4	1	2	3	3	2	4	3	3	4	4	5	5	4	5	5	5	5	5	5	5	5	5	5	5	5	5	5	5	5	5	5	5	5	5	5
Gorica	9	5	3	4	6	4	6	7	7	7	7	9	8	7	8	9	7	8	9	7	7	7	6	6	7	7	8	8	8	8	8	7	7	7	8	6
Rudar	6	9	8	9	9	8	9	9	10	8	9	7	9	9	10	7	9	6	8	9	9	8	8	7	8	8	6	6	6	6	6	6	8	8	6	7
Triglav Kranj	8	7	6	7	8	9	8	8	8	9	10	8	7	8	7	8	6	7	6	6	6	6	7	8	6	6	7	7	7	7	7	8	6	6	7	8
Mura 05	5	8	9	10	10	10	10	10	9	10	8	10	10	10	9	10	10	10	10	10	10	10	10	10	10	10	10	10	10	10	10	10	10	9	9	9
Aluminij	10	10	10	8	7	6	5	5	6	6	6	6	4	6	6	6	8	9	7	8	8	9	9	9	9	9	9	9	9	9	9	9	9	10	10	10

Leader
Qualification for relegation play-offs
Relegated to 2013–14 Slovenian Second League

Source: Slovenian PrvaLiga (in Slovene)

=== Relegation play-offs ===
Mura 05, who finished in ninth place in the league, should play against Dob, who finished in second place in the Slovenian Second League. However, Mura 05 did not get the competition licence for the 2013–14 season and was dissolved, while Dob declined promotion, so the third-placed team of the Slovenian Second League, Krka, got promoted.

== Results ==
Every team plays four times against their opponents, twice at home and twice on the road, for a total of 36 matches.

=== First half of the season ===
Home \ Away	ALU	CEL	DOM	GOR	KOP	MAR	MUR	OLI	RUD	TRI
Aluminij		1–2	0–1	2–1	0–3	1–5	0–2	2–1	3–0	1–0
Celje	2–1		0–0	0–0	0–1	0–2	1–0	1–2	1–1	1–0
Domžale	2–0	0–1		0–1	0–1	2–2	0–2	0–2	2–0	2–1
Gorica	4–1	1–1	1–2		2–0	1–3	3–1	0–1	0–4	2–2
Koper	0–0	1–0	1–2	4–0		2–3	4–1	2–0	1–0	0–0
Maribor	2–1	1–2	2–1	4–0	0–0		1–0	1–0	4–0	1–0
Mura 05	1–3	2–2	1–2	3–1	2–3	1–3		1–2	1–1	2–1
Olimpija	3–0	2–2	1–2	1–3	4–1	0–0	3–1		2–1	5–1
Rudar	1–2	1–0	1–0	2–2	0–0	0–3	2–1	0–5		1–0
Triglav Kranj	1–0	0–0	0–1	2–1	4–0	1–0	3–1	0–3	2–2	

Source: Slovenian PrvaLiga (in Slovene)
Legend: Blue = home team win; Yellow = draw; Red = away team win.

=== Second half of the season ===
Home \ Away	ALU	CEL	DOM	GOR	KOP	MAR	MUR	OLI	RUD	TRI
Aluminij		1–3	1–4	1–3	1–1	1–2	2–2	2–0	3–5	2–2
Celje	0–0		0–0	2–3	2–2	2–1	4–0	2–2	1–1	1–2
Domžale	1–1	1–2		3–0	1–1	1–1	1–1	0–4	2–0	1–1
Gorica	2–0	0–0	0–1		1–1	1–6	2–0	1–1	3–2	0–0
Koper	3–0	0–1	3–0	2–2		2–1	3–1	0–1	2–2	1–1
Maribor	2–2	5–1	1–3	2–1	3–0		4–0	2–1	3–1	4–1
Mura 05	1–1	1–0	0–1	1–1	3–0	1–2		0–4	4–0	2–1
Olimpija	2–0	3–1	1–2	2–2	2–2	1–1	2–1		1–0	4–0
Rudar	3–0	0–1	0–1	1–0	1–4	3–1	3–0	0–1		3–1
Triglav Kranj	0–0	1–0	0–0	2–0	1–1	1–2	0–2	1–4	2–0	

Source: Slovenian PrvaLiga (in Slovene)
Legend: Blue = home team win; Yellow = draw; Red = away team win.

== Season statistics ==
=== Top goalscorers ===
Rank	Player	Club	Goals
1	(Brazil) Marcos Tavares	Maribor	17
2	(Montenegro) Nikola Nikezić	Olimpija	15
2	(Slovenia) Dejan Žigon	Gorica	15
4	(Slovenia) Enis Đurković	Triglav	14
4	(Croatia) Mate Eterović	Mura 05; Rudar	14
4	(Slovenia) Robert Kurež	Aluminij	14
7	(Slovenia) Robert Berić	Maribor	13
8	(Slovenia) Goran Cvijanović	Maribor	12
9	(Slovenia) Andraž Šporar	Olimpija	11
10	(Slovenia) Elvis Bratanovič	Rudar	10
10	(Croatia) Ivan Brečević	Koper	10

=== Hat-tricks ===
Player	For	Against	Result	Date
(Slovenia) Dejan Žigon	Gorica	Mura 05	3–1	22 July 2012
(Brazil) Marcos Tavares	Maribor	Gorica	6–1	17 November 2012
(Brazil) Marcos Tavares	Maribor	Celje	5–1	18 May 2013
(Croatia) Goran Vuk	Domžale	Gorica	3–0	22 May 2013

=== Attendance ===
Rank	Club	Total attendance	Matches played	Average
1	Maribor	51,000	18	2,833
2	Olimpija	22,050	18	1,225
3	Mura 05	15,410^{[A]}	18	856
4	Koper	12,400	18	689
5	Rudar Velenje	12,350	18	686
6	Domžale	11,550	18	669
7	Celje	10,650	18	592
8	Triglav Kranj	8,700	18	483
9	Aluminij	8,100	18	450
10	Gorica	6,320	18	351

== Awards ==
=== PrvaLiga Player of the season ===
- Agim Ibraimi

=== PrvaLiga U23 Player of the season ===
- Boban Jović

=== SPINS XI ===
PrvaLiga Team of the Year 2013
Player	Team	Position
Aleksander Šeliga	Olimpija	Goalkeeper
Aleksander Rajčević	Maribor	Defence
Boban Jović	Olimpija	Defence
Martin Milec	Maribor	Defence
Aleš Mejač	Maribor	Defence
Agim Ibraimi	Maribor	Midfield
Goran Cvijanović	Maribor	Midfield
Nik Omladič	Olimpija	Midfield
Nikola Nikezić	Olimpija	Forward
Enis Đurković	Triglav	Forward
Marcos Tavares	Maribor	Forward

== Footnotes ==
- ^{A} The official figure of 0 attendance on a match between Mura 05 and Koper, during the 34th round, is disputed and presumably wrong. Although the PrvaLiga uses the figure on their official website it can be clearly seen from the official video summary of the match, on the same website, that during the match there were several hundred spectators on the stands. A report from the Slovenian Press Agency uses the figure of 500 spectators for the match.

== See also ==
- 2012 Slovenian Supercup
- 2012–13 Slovenian Football Cup
- 2012–13 Slovenian Second League
