= Andrej Goršek =

Slovenian footballer

Personal information
- Date of birth: 21 October 1970 (age 56)
- Place of birth: SFR Yugoslavia
- Height: 1.87 m (6 ft 2 in)
- Position: Forward

Senior career*
Years	Team	Apps	(Gls)
1991–1992	Rudar Velenje	40	(15)
1992–2000	Celje	209	(67)
2000	Dravograd	4	(1)
2001	Rudar Velenje	13	(1)
2003–2004	Šoštanj	18	(10)
Total		284	(94)

International career
1997	Slovenia	1	(0)
- * Club domestic league appearances and goals

Andrej Goršek (born 21 October 1970) is a Slovenian retired international footballer who played as a forward.

== Career ==
Goršek was capped once by the Slovenian national team, in a 1997 loss against Bosnia and Herzegovina.
