= NK Domžale =

Association football club in Slovenia

Domžale
- Full name: Nogometni klub Domžale
- Nicknames: Ravbarji (The Brigands); Rumeni (The Yellows); Rumena družina (The Yellow Family)
- Founded: 7 November 1920; 106 years ago (as SK Disk)
- Dissolved: January 2026; 10 months ago
- Ground: Domžale Sports Park
- Capacity: 3,100
Home colours	Away colours	Third colours

Nogometni klub Domžale (English: Domžale Football Club), commonly referred to as NK Domžale or simply Domžale, was a Slovenian professional football club from the town of Domžale. Founded in 1920, Domžale spent 28 seasons in the Slovenian PrvaLiga, the top tier of Slovenian football, until the club was dissolved in early 2026 due to financial problems. They played their home matches at the Domžale Sports Park.

Domžale's golden era was in the 2000s, when the club was promoted back to the top flight and subsequently won two consecutive top division titles under manager Slaviša Stojanović, in 2007 and 2008. In addition, they also won two Slovenian Cups (2011 and 2017) and two Slovenian Supercups (2007 and 2011).

== History ==
NK Domžale were founded in 1920 as SK Disk.

The club's golden age began in the summer of 2002, when Slaviša Stojanović took over as the head coach and secured promotion to the Slovenian top division. In the 2005–06 season, they advanced through the first two qualifying rounds of the UEFA Cup before being eliminated in the first round by VfB Stuttgart. They also played in the 2006–07 UEFA Cup qualifying rounds, but were eliminated by Hapoel Tel Aviv. After a 4–0 win against Primorje on 13 May 2007, Domžale were confirmed as league champions for the first time, a feat they repeated the following season.

In January 2026, Domžale announced that they had failed to attract an investor who could keep the club alive. Subsequently, the club withdrew from the top division and was dissolved due to financial problems.

== Stadium ==
Domžale played their home games at the 3,100-capacity Domžale Sports Park, built in 1948. The new western stand was built between October 2003 and April 2004. In June 2006, four floodlights were added (in each corner of the stadium), allowing matches to be played at night.

== Honours ==
League

- Slovenian PrvaLiga
  - Winners (2): 2006–07, 2007–08
  - Runners-up (3): 2004–05, 2005–06, 2010–11
- Slovenian Second League
  - Winners (1): 2002–03

Cup

- Slovenian Cup
  - Winners (2): 2010–11, 2016–17
  - Runners-up (1): 2009–10
- Slovenian Supercup
  - Winners (2): 2007, 2011
  - Runners-up (1): 2008
- MNZ Ljubljana Cup
  - Winners (2): 1992–93, 2002–03

== Domestic league and cup results ==
Season	League	Position	Pts	P	W	D	L	GF	GA	Cup
1991–92	1. SNL	19↓	24	40	5	14	21	26	59	Did not qualify
1992–93	2. SNL	8	29	30	10	9	11	50	54	Round of 16
1993–94	2. SNL	12	25	30	6	13	11	28	45	Did not qualify
1994–95	2. SNL	9	31	30	12	7	11	44	38	Did not qualify
1995–96	2. SNL	8	39	29	10	9	10	32	34	Did not qualify
1996–97	2. SNL	7	39	29	11	6	12	40	30	Round of 16
1997–98	2. SNL	3↑	58	30	17	7	6	63	30	First round
1998–99	1. SNL	8	41	33	10	11	12	40	49	First round
1999–2000	1. SNL	9	41	33	11	8	14	50	51	Round of 16
2000–01	1. SNL	10	37	33	11	4	18	45	64	Round of 16
2001–02	1. SNL	12↓	16	33	3	7	23	26	75	Round of 16
2002–03	2. SNL	1↑	74	30	23	5	2	81	28	Round of 16
2003–04	1. SNL	8	41	32	11	8	13	47	53	Round of 16
2004–05	1. SNL	2	52	32	14	10	8	48	36	Quarter-finals
2005–06	1. SNL	2	71	36	20	11	5	69	28	Quarter-finals
2006–07	1. SNL	1	75	36	21	12	3	64	29	Round of 16
2007–08	1. SNL	1	76	36	22	10	4	69	28	Semi-finals
2008–09	1. SNL	5	50	36	12	14	10	44	40	Round of 16
2009–10	1. SNL	8	45	36	12	9	15	51	59	Runners-up
2010–11	1. SNL	2	67	36	20	7	9	57	35	Winners
2011–12	1. SNL	7	40	36	11	7	18	39	52	Round of 16
2012–13	1. SNL	3	60	36	17	9	10	42	34	Round of 16
2013–14	1. SNL	6	45	36	10	15	11	47	36	Quarter-finals
2014–15	1. SNL	3	68	36	21	5	10	52	22	Semi-finals
2015–16	1. SNL	3	55	36	14	13	9	46	31	Semi-finals
2016–17	1. SNL	4	56	36	16	8	12	63	45	Winners
2017–18	1. SNL	3	73	36	22	7	7	79	31	Round of 16
2018–19	1. SNL	3	63	36	18	9	9	76	47	Quarter-finals
2019–20	1. SNL	8	43	36	12	7	17	52	64	Quarter-finals
2020–21	1. SNL	4	55	36	14	13	9	52	41	Semi-finals
2021–22	1. SNL	7	45	36	11	12	13	47	46	Semi-finals
2022–23	1. SNL	4	52	36	13	13	10	50	42	Round of 16
2023–24	1. SNL	7	43	36	13	4	19	52	60	Round of 32
2024–25	1. SNL	9	29	36	7	8	21	35	66	Second round
2025–26	1. SNL	10 (Note: The club withdrew from the competition after 18 rounds.)	12	18	3	3	12	17	38	Second round

Notes

Key

- P – Matches played
- W – Matches won
- D – Matches drawn
- L – Matches lost
- GF – Goals for
- GA – Goals against
- Pts – Points

Winners	Runners-up	Promoted ↑	Relegated ↓

== European record ==
=== Summary ===
Competition	Pld	W	D	L	GF	GA	Last season played
UEFA Champions League	8	4	0	4	10	12	2008–09
UEFA Cup; UEFA Europa League	38	17	10	11	59	48	2019–20
UEFA Europa Conference League	8	3	2	3	10	15	2023–24
Total	54	24	12	18	79	75	—N/a

Pld = Matches played; W = Matches won; D = Matches drawn; L = Matches lost; GF = Goals for; GA = Goals against.

=== By season ===
All results (home and away) list Domžale's goal tally first.

Season	Competition	Round	Opponent	Home	Away	Agg.
2005–06	UEFA Cup	QR1	(San Marino) Domagnano	3–0	5–0	8–0
2005–06	UEFA Cup	QR2	(Israel) Ashdod	1–1	2–2	3–3 (a)
2005–06	UEFA Cup	R1	(Germany) VfB Stuttgart	1–0	0–2	1–2
2006–07	UEFA Cup	QR1	(Bosnia and Herzegovina) Orašje	5–0	2–0	7–0
2006–07	UEFA Cup	QR2	(Israel) Hapoel Tel Aviv	0–3	2–1	2–4
2007–08	UEFA Champions League	QR1	(Albania) Tirana	1–0	2–1	3–1
2007–08	UEFA Champions League	QR2	(Croatia) Dinamo Zagreb	1–2	1–3	2–5
2008–09	UEFA Champions League	QR1	(Luxembourg) F91 Dudelange	2–0	1–0	3–0
2008–09	UEFA Champions League	QR2	(Croatia) Dinamo Zagreb	0–3	2–3	2–6
2011–12	UEFA Europa League	QR2	(Croatia) RNK Split	1–2	1–3	2–5
2013–14	UEFA Europa League	QR1	(Romania) Astra Giurgiu	0–1	0–2	0–3
2015–16	UEFA Europa League	QR1	(Serbia) Čukarički	0–1	0–0	0–1
2016–17	UEFA Europa League	QR1	(Andorra) Lusitanos	3–1	2–1	5–2
2016–17	UEFA Europa League	QR2	(Belarus) Shakhtyor Soligorsk	2–1	1–1	3–2
2016–17	UEFA Europa League	QR3	(England) West Ham United	2–1	0–3	2–4
2017–18	UEFA Europa League	QR1	(Estonia) Flora Tallinn	2–0	3–2	5–2
2017–18	UEFA Europa League	QR2	(Iceland) Valur	3–2	2–1	5–3
2017–18	UEFA Europa League	QR3	(Germany) SC Freiburg	2–0	0–1	2–1
2017–18	UEFA Europa League	PO	(France) Marseille	1–1	0–3	1–4
2018–19	UEFA Europa League	QR1	(Bosnia and Herzegovina) Široki Brijeg	1–1	2–2	3–3 (a)
2018–19	UEFA Europa League	QR2	(Russia) Ufa	1–1	0–0	1–1 (a)
2019–20	UEFA Europa League	QR1	(Malta) Balzan	1–0	4–3	5–3
2019–20	UEFA Europa League	QR2	(Sweden) Malmö FF	2–2	2–3	4–5
2021–22	UEFA Europa Conference League	QR1	(Luxembourg) Swift Hesperange	1–0	1–1	2–1
2021–22	UEFA Europa Conference League	QR2	(Finland) Honka	1–1	1–0	2–1
2021–22	UEFA Europa Conference League	QR3	(Norway) Rosenborg	1–2	1–6	2–8
2023–24	UEFA Europa Conference League	QR1	(Malta) Balzan	1–4	3–1 (a.e.t.)	4–5

QR1 = First qualifying round; QR2 = Second qualifying round; QR3 = Third qualifying round; PO = Play-off round; R1 = First round.
