= ND Gorica =

Association football club in Slovenia

Gorica
- Full name: Nogometno društvo Gorica
- Nicknames: Vrtnice (The Roses); Plavo-beli (The Blue and Whites)
- Founded: October 1947; 79 years ago (as FD Gorica)
- Dissolved: 2026; 0 years ago
- Ground: Nova Gorica Sports Park
- Capacity: 3,100
Home colours	Away colours

Nogometno društvo Gorica, commonly referred to as ND Gorica or simply Gorica, was a Slovenian football club based in Nova Gorica. They were one of the most successful Slovenian clubs with four Slovenian PrvaLiga and three Slovenian Cup titles. The club played its home matches at the Nova Gorica Sports Park with a capacity of 3,100 seats.

In 2026, the club was dissolved due to financial problems.

== History ==
=== Yugoslav period (1947–1991) ===
The history of football in the Goriška region goes back to 1907, when the first football club Jugoslavija was formed by the Slovenes of Gorizia.

October 1947 marks the beginning of the club with the foundation of FD Gorica in Šempeter pri Gorici, where it operated until 1963. They started in the second-level but quickly promoted to the Slovenian Republic League in 1950 under the new name Železničar Nova Gorica. Five years later they became republic champions and qualified for the Yugoslav Second League, which was club's biggest achievement during the time of Yugoslavia. In 1963 the club merged with Branik Solkan and the club's activity was transferred to Nova Gorica, where it remains ever since. They stabilised as a mid-table club in the 1960s, renamed as NK Vozila in 1971 and achieved better results only in the last years before Slovenia's independence. Managed by Pavel Pinni, Vozila finished third in the 1988–89 season of the Slovenian Republic League.

=== Slovenian independence (1991 to 2026) ===
Following Slovenia's independence in 1991, the club played in the 1. SNL under the name HIT Gorica and during the 1995–96 season, Gorica won the Slovenian championship for the first time. In the next season, the club played its first Slovenian Supercup final and won their second trophy with a 3–1 victory over Olimpija. During the league domination of Maribor, the club managed to win two Slovenian cup titles in a row (2000–01 and 2001–02).

On the last day of the 2003–04 season on 30 May 2004, Gorica won its second title after one of the most dramatic rounds in the Slovenian league history. Before the last round, Maribor was leading the table with 54 points, one point ahead of Gorica. In the final round, Maribor played an away match against their rivals Mura and Gorica played at home against Koper. Maribor lost the game 2–1 after a second-half comeback by Mura, meaning that Gorica, who eventually won against Koper 2–0, had secured their second title.

The second title started an impressive run for Gorica as the team won another two league titles in a row (2004–05 and 2005–06). After the last title, Gorica was a runner-up in the 2006–07 and 2008–09 seasons, while finishing third in 2007–08 and 2009–10.

In 2013, Gorica started cooperating with Italian club Parma. In May 2014, they won their first trophy in eight years as they defeated Maribor 2–0 in the cup final. After 28 seasons in the top division, Gorica was relegated for the first time in the 2018–19 season after losing the relegation play-offs against Tabor Sežana.

== Honours ==
League

- Slovenian First League
  - Winners (4): 1995–96, 2003–04, 2004–05, 2005–06
  - Runners-up (5): 1998–99, 1999–2000, 2006–07, 2008–09, 2016–17
- Slovenian Second League
  - Winners: 2021–22

Cup

- Slovenian Cup
  - Winners (3): 2000–01, 2001–02, 2013–14
  - Runners-up (2): 2004–05, 2023–24
- Slovenian Supercup
  - Winners: 1996
  - Runners-up: 2014

== Domestic league and cup results ==
Season	League	Position	Pts	P	W	D	L	GF	GA	Cup
1991–92	1. SNL	4	46	40	15	16	9	63	40	Round of 16
1992–93	1. SNL	12	31	34	11	9	14	39	46	First round
1993–94	1. SNL	5	35	30	12	11	7	40	38	First round
1994–95	1. SNL	3	41	30	18	5	7	66	30	Quarter-finals
1995–96	1. SNL	1	67	36	18	13	5	49	22	Quarter-finals
1996–97	1. SNL	3	65	36	18	11	7	52	33	Round of 16
1997–98	1. SNL	3	65	36	20	5	11	64	36	Round of 16
1998–99	1. SNL	2	62	33	18	8	7	55	31	First round
1999–2000	1. SNL	2	62	33	19	5	9	55	34	Semi-finals
2000–01	1. SNL	7	43	33	13	4	16	52	46	Winners
2001–02	1. SNL	4	51	33	14	9	10	38	40	Winners
2002–03	1. SNL	8	34	31	7	13	11	34	43	Quarter-finals
2003–04	1. SNL	1	56	32	15	11	6	55	29	Round of 16
2004–05	1. SNL	1	65	32	18	11	3	49	23	Runners-up
2005–06	1. SNL	1	73	36	21	10	5	75	30	Semi-finals
2006–07	1. SNL	2	58	36	17	7	12	66	63	Semi-finals
2007–08	1. SNL	3	57	36	16	9	11	61	50	Round of 16
2008–09	1. SNL	2	56	36	17	5	14	60	55	Semi-finals
2009–10	1. SNL	3	55	36	16	7	13	74	60	Quarter-finals
2010–11	1. SNL	5	48	36	13	9	14	42	53	Quarter-finals
2011–12	1. SNL	5	53	36	14	11	11	49	37	Quarter-finals
2012–13	1. SNL	6	41	36	10	11	15	45	60	Quarter-finals
2013–14	1. SNL	4	58	36	16	10	10	60	32	Winners
2014–15	1. SNL	9	37	36	10	7	19	40	46	Quarter-finals
2015–16	1. SNL	4	52	36	15	7	14	48	49	First round
2016–17	1. SNL	2	60	36	16	12	8	48	39	Quarter-finals
2017–18	1. SNL	6	47	36	14	5	17	40	48	Semi-finals
2018–19	1. SNL	9↓	31	36	7	10	19	44	63	Quarter-finals
2019–20 (Note: The season was not completed due to the COVID-19 pandemic.)	2. SNL	2↑	41	20	13	2	5	40	22	Round of 16
2020–21	1. SNL	10↓	29	36	7	8	21	24	58	did not qualify
2021–22	2. SNL	1↑	72	30	23	3	4	55	20	First round
2022–23	1. SNL	9↓	27	36	5	12	19	31	57	First round
2023–24	2. SNL	4	53	30	15	8	7	51	28	Runners-up
2024–25	2. SNL	3	59	30	17	8	5	60	34	Second round
2025–26	2. SNL	15↓	22	30	4	10	16	31	45	Second round

Notes

Key

- P – Matches played
- W – Matches won
- D – Matches drawn
- L – Matches lost
- GF – Goals for
- GA – Goals against
- Pts – Points

Winners	Runners-up	Promoted ↑	Relegated ↓

== European record ==
All results (home and away) list Gorica's goal tally first.

Season	Competition	Round	Opponent	Home	Away	Agg.
1996–97	UEFA Cup	PR	(North Macedonia) Vardar	0–1	1–2	1–3
1997–98	UEFA Cup	1Q	(Romania) Oţelul Galaţi	2–0	2–4	4–4 (a)
1997–98	UEFA Cup	2Q	(Belgium) Club Brugge	3–5	0–3	3–8
1999–2000	UEFA Cup	Q	(Wales) Inter Cardiff	2–0	0–1	2–1
1999–2000	UEFA Cup	1R	(Greece) Panathinaikos	0–1	0–2	0–3
2000–01	UEFA Cup	Q	(Azerbaijan) Neftchi Baku	3–1	0–1	3–2
2000–01	UEFA Cup	1R	(Italy) Roma	1–4	0–7	1–11
2001–02	UEFA Cup	Q	(Azerbaijan) Neftchi Baku	1–0	0–0	1–0
2001–02	UEFA Cup	1R	(Croatia) Osijek	1–2	0–1	1–3
2002–03	UEFA Cup	Q	(Romania) Rapid București	1–3	0–2	1–5
2004–05	UEFA Champions League	1Q	(Estonia) Flora Tallinn	3–1	4–2	7–3
2004–05	UEFA Champions League	2Q	(Denmark) Copenhagen	1–2	5–0	6–2
2004–05	UEFA Champions League	3Q	(France) Monaco	0–3	0–6	0–9
2004–05	UEFA Cup	1R	(Greece) AEK Athens	1–1	0–1	1–2
2005–06	UEFA Champions League	1Q	(Albania) Tirana	2–0	0–3	2–3
2006–07	UEFA Champions League	1Q	(Northern Ireland) Linfield	2–2	3–1	5–3
2006–07	UEFA Champions League	2Q	(Romania) Steaua București	0–2	0–3	0–5
2007–08	UEFA Cup	1Q	(North Macedonia) Rabotnički	1–2	1–2	2–4
2008	UEFA Intertoto Cup	1R	(Malta) Hibernians	0–0	3–0	3–0
2008	UEFA Intertoto Cup	2R	(Bulgaria) Chernomorets Burgas	0–2	1–1	1–3
2009–10	UEFA Europa League	2Q	(Finland) Lahti	1–0	0–2	1–2
2010–11	UEFA Europa League	2Q	(Denmark) Randers	0–3	1–1	1–4
2014–15	UEFA Europa League	2Q	(Norway) Molde	1–1	1–4	2–5
2016–17	UEFA Europa League	1Q	(Israel) Maccabi Tel Aviv	0–1	0–3	0–4
2017–18	UEFA Europa League	1Q	(Armenia) Shirak	2–2	2–0	4–2
2017–18	UEFA Europa League	2Q	(Greece) Panionios	2–3	0–2	2–5

Notes

- PR: Preliminary round
- Q: Qualifying round
- 1Q: First qualifying round
- 2Q: Second qualifying round
- 3Q: Third qualifying round
- 1R: First round
- 2R: Second round

== Notable managers ==
The following managers have won at least one trophy when in charge of Gorica since Slovenia's independence in 1991:

Head coach	Period	Honours
(Slovenia) Milan Miklavič	1995–1996	1995–96 Slovenian First Division; 1996 Slovenian Supercup
(Slovenia) Toni Tomažič	2001	2000–01 Slovenian Football Cup
(Slovenia) Pavel Pinni	2001–2006	2001–02 Slovenian Football Cup; 2003–04 Slovenian First Division; 2004–05 Slovenian First Division; 2005–06 Slovenian First Division
(Slovenia) Miran Srebrnič	2009; 2011–2013; 2014; 2015–2018; 2021–2023; 2023–2024	2021–22 Slovenian Second League
(Italy) Luigi Apolloni	2013–2014	2013–14 Slovenian Football Cup
