= Damir Pekič =

Slovenian footballer

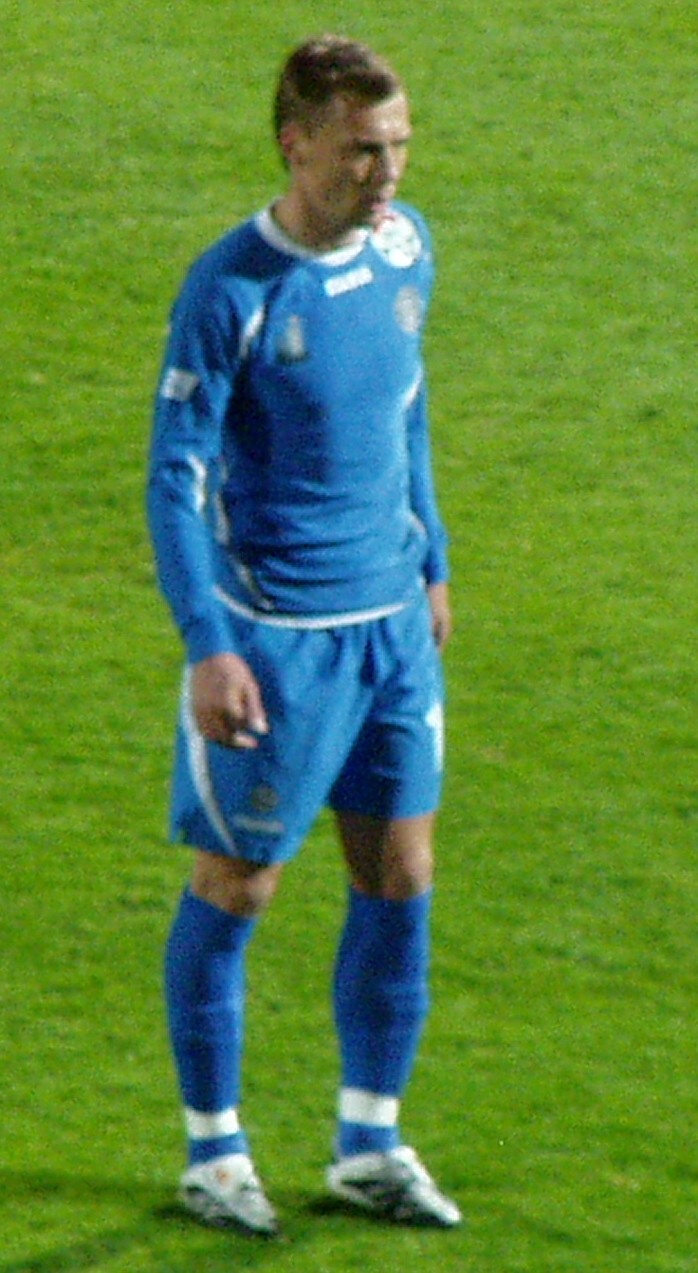
- Pekič in 2007

Personal information
- Full name: Damir Pekič
- Date of birth: 15 January 1979 (age 47)
- Place of birth: Maribor, SFR Yugoslavia
- Height: 1.80 m (5 ft 11 in)
- Position: Striker

Youth career
- –1995: Kovinar Maribor
- 1995–1997: Maribor

Senior career*
Years	Team	Apps	(Gls)
1997–2004	Maribor	96	(39)
1999–2000	→ Železničar Maribor (loan)		
2000–2001	→ Celje (loan)	29	(23)
2004–2005	Rot Weiss Ahlen	0	(0)
2005–2006	Marítimo	0	(0)
2006–2007	Maribor	46	(18)
2007–2009	Zalaegerszeg	27	(5)
2009	Nafta Lendava	13	(1)
2009–2012	Domžale	81	(22)
2012–2013	SV Wildon	27	(8)
2013–2014	Frauental	34	(15)

International career
1994–1995	Slovenia U16	5	(0)
1995–1997	Slovenia U18	10	(3)
1998	Slovenia U20	3	(1)
1999–2001	Slovenia U21	18	(6)
- * Club domestic league appearances and goals

Damir Pekič (born 15 January 1979) is a former Slovenian football player who played as a forward

== Club career ==
Pekič started his senior career in Maribor. Before he was given a real chance in the club he was sent to Celje on loan for a season. There he was the best scorer of the 2000–01 Slovenian PrvaLiga season as he scored 23 goals in 29 games.
