= Kliton Bozgo =

Albanian footballer and manager (born 1971)

Personal information
- Date of birth: 5 December 1971 (age 54)
- Place of birth: Gjirokastër, Albania
- Height: 1.70 m (5 ft 7 in)
- Position: Striker

Youth career
- Tomori Berat

Senior career*
Years	Team	Apps	(Gls)
1989–1992	Tomori	70	(47)
1992–1993	Dubrava		
1993–1995	Maribor	40	(21)
1995–1998	Olimpija	74	(31)
1998–2000	Maribor	60	(39)
2000–2004	Admira Wacker	132	(21)
2004–2005	Maribor	28	(18)
2005	Drava Ptuj	5	(0)
2006	Hartberg	9	(7)
2006–2007	St. Andrä	13	(4)
2007	SV Flavia Solva	13	(4)
2007–2008	Mura 05	21	(2)
2008–2012	FC Gamlitz	75	(12)
2015	SV Sachsenburg	3	(0)

International career
1993–1997	Albania	12	(0)

Managerial career
- 2009–2010: FC Gamlitz
- 2011: FC Gamlitz
- 2011–2012: FC Gamlitz
- 2013: Aluminij (caretaker)
- 2016–2018: SV Kaindorf
- 2018–2019: USV Ragnitz
- 2019: SV Strass
- 2020–2021: USV Ragnitz
- 2023–2024: USV Ragnitz
- 2024–: SV Strass
- * Club domestic league appearances and goals

Kliton Bozgo (born 5 December 1971) is a retired Albanian footballer.

== Club career ==
During his career, Bozgo had played for both Slovenian giants Olimpija and Maribor. He made a big impact in the Slovenian First League, especially with Maribor, where he is still regarded as one of the best forwards to have ever played for the club. Overall, he scored a total of 110 goals for Maribor.

He was the top scorer of the Slovenian First League twice, in 1999–2000 (24 goals) and 2004–05 (18 goals). In the 1999–2000 season, he reached the UEFA Champions League group stages with Maribor. In total, he has played 207 matches in the Slovenian First League, scoring 109 goals in the process.

== International career ==
Bozgo made his debut for Albania in a February 1993 FIFA World Cup qualification match against Northern Ireland, and earned a total of twelve caps for the national team, scoring no goals. His final international was in February 2000 against Malta.

== Managerial career ==
While playing for Mura 05, Bozgo also took over the position of assistant coach to Edin Osmanović. In 2013, he joined Osmanović again, this time as assistant coach at Aluminij. At the end of the season, Aluminij were relegated and Osmanović was replaced by Ante Šimundža who had been Bozgo's teammate at Maribor in the 1999–2000 season and who decided to keep Bozgo at the club as assistant manager. After only three months with the club, Šimundža was hired as the new head coach at Maribor in September 2013, and Aluminij made Bozgo an interim head coach. On 10 October 2013, the club announced Robert Pevnik as the new head coach, and Bozgo stayed on as his assistant until the end of the season. In 2015, he joined SV Sachsenburg as player-manager, and in January 2016, he started a new chapter with SV Kaindorf in the Austrian Gebietsliga. In April 2018, the club replaced him with Gernot Krinner.
