= NK Korotan Prevalje (1933) =

Korotan Prevalje
- Full name: Nogometni klub Korotan Prevalje
- Nickname(s): Plavi (The Blues); Knezi (The Princes)
- Founded: 1933; 92 years ago
- Dissolved: 2003; 22 years ago
- Ground: Stadion na Prevaljah
Home colours	Away colours

Nogometni klub Korotan Prevalje (English: Korotan Prevalje Football Club), commonly referred to as NK Korotan Prevalje or simply Korotan, was a Slovenian football club from Prevalje, which played a total of nine seasons in the Slovenian PrvaLiga, the highest level of football in Slovenia. The club was dissolved during the 2002–03 Slovenian PrvaLiga season, when they folded after only eleven rounds due to financial reasons.

A successor club which claims rights to Korotan's honours and records was established in 2002 under the name DNŠ Prevalje. However, they are not legally considered to be successors to the original Korotan and the two clubs' track records and honours are kept separate by the Football Association of Slovenia.
