= NK Primorje =

Slovenian football club

Primorje
- Full name: Nogometni klub Primorje Ajdovščina
- Nickname(s): Sinovi burje (The Sons of Bora)
- Founded: 1924; 101 years ago
- Dissolved: 2011; 14 years ago
- Ground: Ajdovščina City Stadium
- Capacity: 1,630
Home colours	Away colours

Nogometni klub Primorje (English: Primorje Football Club), commonly referred to as NK Primorje or simply Primorje, was a Slovenian football club from Ajdovščina. After Slovenia's independence in 1991, Primorje spent a total of 18 seasons in the Slovenian First League until the club's disbandment after the 2010–11 season, when it could not obtain a competition license from the Football Association of Slovenia due to high financial indebtedness. Their best league finish was second place in the 1996–97 and 2001–02 seasons.

A successor club was established in June 2011 under the name DNŠ Ajdovščina.

== Stadium ==
The team played their home matches at Ajdovščina City Stadium, a 1,630 capacity stadium in Ajdovščina. The stadium was renovated during the 2009–10 season, and was reopened in September 2010.

== Honours ==
- Slovenian PrvaLiga
  - Runners-up: 1996–97, 2001–02
- Slovenian Second League
  - Winners: 2009–10
- Slovenian Cup
  - Runners-up: 1995–96, 1996–97, 1997–98
