= 2026–27 Slovenian PrvaLiga =

36th season of the Slovenian PrvaLiga

Slovenian PrvaLiga
- Season: 2026–27
- Dates: 17 July 2026 – 22 May 2027
- Matches: 49
- Goals: 129 (2.63 per match)
- Top goalscorer: Amadej Maroša (6 goals)
- Biggest home win: Maribor 3–0 Brinje Grosuplje (25 July 2026); Nafta 1903 5–2 Mura (1 August 2026); Brinje Grosuplje 4–1 Celje (30 August 2026); Olimpija Ljubljana 3–0 Brinje Grosuplje (5 September 2026)
- Biggest away win: Mura 1–6 Aluminij (13 September 2026)
- Highest scoring: Nafta 1903 5–2 Mura (1 August 2026); Mura 1–6 Aluminij (13 September 2026)
- Highest attendance: 7,160; Maribor 2–2 Aluminij (19 September 2026)
- Lowest attendance: 180; Koper 2–0 Nafta 1903 (19 September 2026)
- Total attendance: 59,811
- Average attendance: 1,221
- All statistics correct as of 20 September 2026.

The 2026–27 Slovenian PrvaLiga is the 36th season of the Slovenian PrvaLiga, the top flight of Slovenian football. For sponsorship reasons, the competition is officially known as the Prva liga Telemach. The season began on 17 July 2026 and is scheduled to end on 22 May 2027.

Ten clubs contest the league, playing each other four times for a total of 180 fixtures. All league matches are broadcast live in Slovenia by Sportklub and Šport TV. Celje entered the season as defending champions after winning their third Slovenian league title in 2025–26.

== Summary ==
=== Developments ===
The composition of the league changed substantially from the previous season. NK Domžale ceased operating its senior team in January 2026 and did not complete the 2025–26 campaign. Brinje Grosuplje won the 2025–26 Slovenian Second League on the final day and were promoted to the top flight for the first time in club history. Nafta 1903 returned after one season in the second tier by defeating Primorje 1–0 on aggregate in the promotion/relegation play-off.

Brinje began their first top-flight campaign with a 2–0 away victory against Radomlje, with Nal Lan Koren scoring the club's first PrvaLiga goal. Their first PrvaLiga home match, against Koper on 2 August, finished 1–1 despite Brinje receiving two red cards.

Olimpija Ljubljana changed manager after losing their opening two matches. Mišo Brečko left by mutual consent on 28 July and was replaced the same day by Jugoslav Trenčovski, who had managed Radomlje in the previous season.

The first Eternal derby of the season, played at Stožice on 15 August, finished 1–1 and drew 6,000 spectators. On 30 August, newly promoted Brinje defeated defending champions Celje 4–1, handing Celje their first league defeat of the season and recording the largest victory of the campaign to that point. Celje responded on 2 September by winning their postponed second-round match at Aluminij 2–0.

In the eighth round, Nafta 1903 beat Radomlje 3–1, with Amadej Maroša scoring twice to move to six league goals. Maribor remained unbeaten and top of the table after a 1–1 draw with Mura, while Koper moved to within one point of the leaders by winning 1–0 away to Celje.

In the ninth round, Nafta won 2–1 away to Brinje, with Josip Ivan Zorica scoring his fifth league goal of the season. Olimpija Ljubljana defeated Koper 3–1 in Sežana after Koper's Brown Irabor was sent off in the first half, while Bravo came from behind with two late goals to beat defending champions Celje 2–1. Aluminij recorded the season's largest away win by beating Mura 6–1 at Fazanerija, before Maribor completed the round with a 3–0 victory at Radomlje to remain unbeaten and move four points clear at the top of the table.

After the ninth round, Celje replaced Vítor Campelos with Zoran Zeljković, who left Koper to take charge of the defending champions. Milan Anđelković succeeded Zeljković at Koper.

In the tenth round, Koper beat Nafta 2–0, while Maribor drew 2–2 with Aluminij in front of 7,160 spectators, setting a new season-high attendance. Bravo defeated Olimpija Ljubljana 2–1 for a sixth consecutive Ljubljana derby victory, Mura and Celje drew 0–0, and Brinje beat Radomlje 2–1 through a 90th-minute Haris Vučkić winner.

During the subsequent international break, bottom-placed Radomlje dismissed Ivan Vukomanović on 4 October and appointed Bulgarian coach Radostin Aleksandrov the following day.

== Teams ==
Ten teams participate in the league. The Football Association of Slovenia confirmed the composition of the competition on 18 June 2026.

=== Team changes ===
| Promoted to PrvaLiga | Relegated / departed from PrvaLiga |
|---|---|
| Brinje Grosuplje; 2025–26 Slovenian Second League champions | Domžale; Withdrew during the 2025–26 season |
| Nafta 1903; Won promotion/relegation play-off | Primorje; Lost promotion/relegation play-off |

=== Stadiums and locations ===
Locations of the 2026–27 Slovenian PrvaLiga teams

Note: Table lists clubs in alphabetical order.

| Team | Location | Stadium | Capacity |
|---|---|---|---|
| Aluminij | Kidričevo | Aluminij Sports Park | 789 |
| Bravo | Ljubljana | Stožice Stadium | 16,100 |
| Brinje Grosuplje | Grosuplje | Brinje Football Park | 500 |
| Celje | Celje | Stadion Z'dežele | 13,059 |
| Koper | Koper | Bonifika Stadium | 4,047 |
| Maribor | Maribor | Ljudski vrt | 11,671 |
| Mura | Murska Sobota | Fazanerija City Stadium | 4,706 |
| Nafta 1903 | Lendava | Lendava Sports Park | 2,000 |
| Olimpija Ljubljana | Ljubljana | Stožice Stadium | 16,100 |
| Radomlje | Radomlje | Domžale Sports Park | 3,100 |

=== Personnel and kits ===
| Team | Manager | Captain | Kit manufacturer | Main kit sponsor(s) |
|---|---|---|---|---|
| Aluminij | (Slovenia) Jure Arsić | (Croatia) Tomislav Jagić | Adidas | Talum; Hiša Daril |
| Bravo | (Slovenia) Aleš Arnol | (Slovenia) Sandi Nuhanović | Erreà | Mastercard; Generali; Big Bang |
| Brinje Grosuplje | (Slovenia) Goran Markovič | (Slovenia) Nejc Pušnik | Kelme | GEN-I; Gabrijel Aluminium |
| Celje | (Slovenia) Zoran Zeljković | (Slovenia) Mark Zabukovnik | Nike | Cinkarna Celje; GRAWE |
| Koper | (Slovenia) Milan Anđelković | (Slovenia) Josip Iličić | Macron | Luka Koper |
| Maribor | (Slovenia) Darko Milanič | (Slovenia) Ažbe Jug | Adidas | Zavarovalnica Sava; OTP banka |
| Mura | (Slovenia) Mitja Mörec | (Slovenia) Nino Kouter | Adidas | Generali |
| Nafta 1903 | (Spain) Mere Hermoso | (Slovenia) Aleks Pihler | 2Rule | — |
| Olimpija Ljubljana | (North Macedonia) Jugoslav Trenchovski | (Slovenia) Matevž Vidovšek | Puma | Dongfeng |
| Radomlje | (Bulgaria) Radostin Aleksandrov | (Bosnia and Herzegovina) Ognjen Gnjatić | Joma | Kalcer |

=== Managerial changes ===
| Team | Outgoing manager | Date | Position | Incoming manager | Date |
|---|---|---|---|---|---|
| Olimpija Ljubljana | (Slovenia) Mišo Brečko | 27 July 2026 | 10th | (North Macedonia) Jugoslav Trenchovski | 28 July 2026 |
| Celje | (Portugal) Vítor Campelos | 14 September 2026 | 7th | (Slovenia) Zoran Zeljković | 15 September 2026 |
| Koper | (Slovenia) Zoran Zeljković | 15 September 2026 | 3rd | (Slovenia) Milan Anđelković | 15 September 2026 |
| Radomlje | (Serbia) Ivan Vukomanović | 4 October 2026 | 10th | (Bulgaria) Radostin Aleksandrov | 5 October 2026 |

== League table ==
| Pos | Team | Pld | W | D | L | GF | GA | GD | Pts | Qualification or relegation |
|---|---|---|---|---|---|---|---|---|---|---|
| 1 | Koper | 15 | 8 | 5 | 2 | 26 | 13 | +13 | 29 | Qualification for the Champions League first qualifying round |
| 2 | Olimpija Ljubljana | 16 | 7 | 5 | 4 | 18 | 13 | +5 | 26 | Qualification for the Conference League second qualifying round |
| 3 | Bravo | 16 | 7 | 5 | 4 | 19 | 17 | +2 | 26 | Qualification for the Conference League second qualifying round |
| 4 | Maribor | 15 | 6 | 6 | 3 | 22 | 16 | +6 | 24 | |
| 5 | Celje | 14 | 6 | 5 | 3 | 19 | 13 | +6 | 23 | |
| 6 | Nafta 1903 | 15 | 5 | 4 | 6 | 19 | 21 | −2 | 19 | |
| 7 | Aluminij | 15 | 4 | 5 | 6 | 21 | 14 | +7 | 17 | |
| 8 | Brinje Grosuplje | 15 | 4 | 4 | 7 | 16 | 25 | −9 | 16 | |
| 9 | Mura | 16 | 2 | 8 | 6 | 16 | 28 | −12 | 14 | Qualification for the relegation play-offs |
| 10 | Radomlje | 15 | 1 | 5 | 9 | 16 | 32 | −16 | 8 | Relegation to the Slovenian Second League |

Updated to match(es) played on 21 November 2026. Source: Football Association of Slovenia
Rules for classification: 1) Points; 2) Head-to-head points; 3) Head-to-head goal difference; 4) Head-to-head goals scored; 5) Goal difference; 6) Goals scored

The winners of the 2026–27 Slovenian Football Cup qualify for the Europa League first qualifying round.

== Results ==
The ten clubs play each other four times, twice at home and twice away, for 36 matches per club.

| Home \ Away | ALU | BRA | BRI | CEL | KOP | MAR | MUR | NAF | OLI | RAD | ALU | BRA | BRI | CEL | KOP | MAR | MUR | NAF | OLI | RAD |
|---|---|---|---|---|---|---|---|---|---|---|---|---|---|---|---|---|---|---|---|---|
| Aluminij | | 0–0 | 4–2 | 0–2 | 0–1 | 0–0 | | 1–1 | 0–1 | 5–0 | | | | | | | | | | |
| Bravo | 28 Nov | | 1–1 | 2–1 | 1–2 | 2–1 | 2–0 | 0–3 | 2–1 | 2–2 | | | | | | | | | | |
| Brinje Grosuplje | 1–0 | 0–0 | | 4–1 | 1–1 | 1–2 | 1–2 | 1–2 | 28 Nov | 2–1 | | | | | | | | | | |
| Celje | 1–0 | | 22 Nov | | 0–1 | 1–1 | 2–2 | 4–0 | 1–0 | | | | | | | | | | | |
| Koper | 23 Nov | 0–0 | 5–0 | 28 Nov | | 4–0 | 1–1 | 2–0 | 1–3 | 2–2 | | | | | | | | | | |
| Maribor | 2–2 | 3–1 | 3–0 | 0–0 | 2–0 | | 1–1 | 22 Nov | 0–1 | | | | | | | | | | | |
| Mura | 1–6 | 1–2 | 0–0 | 0–0 | 0–1 | 28 Nov | | 0–0 | 1–0 | 1–3 | | | | | | | | | | |
| Nafta 1903 | 0–0 | 1–0 | | 1–3 | 0–2 | 2–3 | 5–2 | | 1–1 | 3–1 | | | | | | | | | | |
| Olimpija Ljubljana | 1–0 | 0–2 | 3–0 | 1–1 | | 1–1 | 3–3 | 1–0 | | 1–0 | | | | | | | | | | |
| Radomlje | 1–3 | 1–2 | 0–2 | 1–2 | 3–3 | 0–3 | 1–1 | 28 Nov | 0–0 | | | | | | | | | | | |

Updated to match(es) played on 21 November 2026. Source: Football Association of Slovenia
Legend: Blue = home team win; Yellow = draw; Red = away team win.

== Season statistics ==
Statistics are current through matches played on 31 October 2026.

=== Top scorers ===
| Rank | Player | Club | Goals |
|---|---|---|---|
| 1 | (Slovenia) Amadej Maroša | Nafta 1903 | 7 |
| 2 | (Nigeria) Bede Osuji | Aluminij | 6 |
| 3 | (Slovenia) Tio Cipot | Maribor | 5 |
| 3 | (Croatia) Josip Ivan Zorica | Nafta 1903 | 5 |
| 5 | (Slovenia) Niko Kasalo | Mura | 4 |
| 5 | (Nigeria) Brown Irabor | Koper | 4 |
| 5 | (Democratic Republic of the Congo) Isaac Tshipamba | Maribor | 4 |
| 5 | (Albania) Indrit Tuci | Olimpija Ljubljana | 4 |
| 5 | (Croatia) Petar Petriško | Aluminij | 4 |
| 5 | (Slovenia) Svit Sešlar | Celje | 4 |

Source: Football Association of Slovenia

==== Hat-tricks ====
| Player | For | Against | Result | Date |
|---|---|---|---|---|
| (Nigeria) Bede Osuji | Aluminij | Radomlje | 3–1 (A) | 16 August 2026 |

(H) – Home; (A) – Away

=== Discipline ===
Through 20 September, 215 yellow cards and 11 red cards had been shown.

==== Player ====
- Most yellow cards: 5
  - (France) Marwann Nzuzi (Bravo)
- Most red cards: 2
  - (Nigeria) Arinze James Inyere (Bravo)

==== Club ====
- Most yellow cards: 28
  - Mura
  - Koper
- Fewest yellow cards: 13
  - Celje
- Most red cards: 3
  - Bravo
- Fewest red cards: 0
  - Nafta 1903
  - Maribor
  - Olimpija Ljubljana

== Attendances ==
Through 20 September 2026, total attendance was 59,811, an average of 1,221 spectators per match. The highest attendance was 7,160 for Maribor's 2–2 draw with Aluminij on 19 September, while the lowest was 180 for Koper's 2–0 win over Nafta 1903 on the same day. Maribor's 1–1 draw with Mura on 6 September was played behind closed doors.

| Statistic | Match / figure |
|---|---|
| Total attendance | 59,811 |
| Average attendance | 1,221 |
| Highest attendance | 7,160 – Maribor 2–2 Aluminij |
| Lowest attendance | 180 – Koper 2–0 Nafta 1903 |

== Awards ==
=== Player of the Month ===
| Month | Player | Club |
|---|---|---|
| August | (Slovenia) Tio Cipot | Maribor |
| September | (Slovenia) Žan Karničnik | Maribor |
