= 2017–18 Slovenian PrvaLiga =

Slovenian PrvaLiga
- Season: 2017–18
- Dates: 15 July 2017 – 27 May 2018
- Champions: Olimpija Ljubljana (2nd title)
- Relegated: Ankaran
- Champions League: Olimpija Ljubljana
- Europa League: Maribor; Domžale; Rudar Velenje
- Matches played: 180
- Goals scored: 500 (2.78 per match)
- Best Player: Senijad Ibričić
- Top goalscorer: Luka Zahović (18 goals)
- Biggest home win: Domžale 6–0 Ankaran; Celje 7–1 Ankaran
- Biggest away win: Gorica 0–6 Maribor
- Highest scoring: Celje 7–1 Ankaran
- Longest winning run: 11 matches Domžale
- Longest unbeaten run: 18 matches Olimpija
- Longest winless run: 11 matches Triglav
- Longest losing run: 5 matches Triglav
- Highest attendance: 13,000; Olimpija 0–0 Maribor
- Lowest attendance: 25; Triglav 2–0 Krško
- Total attendance: 214,675
- Average attendance: 1,199

The 2017–18 Slovenian PrvaLiga (also known as the Prva liga Telekom Slovenije for sponsorship reasons) was the 27th edition of the Slovenian PrvaLiga since its establishment in 1991. The season began on 15 July 2017 and ended on 27 May 2018.

== Competition format ==
Each team played 36 matches (18 home and 18 away). Teams played four matches against each other (2 home and 2 away).

== Teams ==
A total of ten teams contested the league, including eight from the 2016–17 Slovenian PrvaLiga and two promoted from the 2016–17 Slovenian Second League.

=== Stadiums and locations ===
Seating capacity only; some stadiums also have standing areas. Ankaran played their home matches in Dravograd and Nova Gorica since their stadium, ŠRC Katarina, did not met PrvaLiga criteria.

Aluminij	Ankaran	Celje	Domžale
Aluminij Sports Park	Dravograd Sports Centre	Stadion Z'dežele	Domžale Sports Park
Capacity: 600	Capacity: 1,918	Capacity: 13,059	Capacity: 3,100
Gorica	2017–18 Slovenian PrvaLiga is located in Slovenia		Krško
Nova Gorica Sports Park	2017–18 Slovenian PrvaLiga is located in Slovenia		Matija Gubec
Capacity: 3,100	2017–18 Slovenian PrvaLiga is located in Slovenia		Capacity: 1,470
Maribor	Olimpija Ljubljana	Rudar Velenje	Triglav Kranj
Ljudski vrt	Stožice Stadium	Ob Jezeru City Stadium	Stanko Mlakar Stadium
Capacity: 12,702	Capacity: 16,038	Capacity: 1,864	Capacity: 2,060

=== Personnel and kits ===
Team	Manager	Captain	Kit manufacturer	Shirt sponsor
Aluminij	(Slovenia) Oliver Bogatinov	(Slovenia) Matic Vrbanec	Zeus Sport	Talum, Zavarovalnica Sava
Ankaran	(Slovenia) Vlado Badžim	(Slovenia) Jan Pahor	Nike	None
Celje	(Slovenia) Dušan Kosič	(Slovenia) Jure Travner	Legea	Droga, Cinkarna Celje
Domžale	(Slovenia) Simon Rožman	(Slovenia) Dejan Milić	Joma	Tark
Gorica	(Slovenia) Miran Srebrnič	(Slovenia) Alen Jogan	Erreà	Hit, E 3
Krško	(Slovenia) Alen Ščulac	(Slovenia) Marko Krajcer	Erima	GEN, Kostak
Maribor	(Slovenia) Darko Milanič	(Brazil) Marcos Tavares	Adidas	Zavarovalnica Sava, Nova KBM, Radio City
Olimpija Ljubljana	(Croatia) Igor Bišćan	(Slovenia) Branko Ilić	Nike	None
Rudar Velenje	(Slovenia) Marijan Pušnik	(Slovenia) David Kašnik	Joma	None
Triglav Kranj	(Slovenia) Siniša Brkić	(Slovenia) Elvis Džafić	Peak	Domplan

=== Managerial changes ===
Team	Outgoing manager	Date of vacancy	Position in table	Incoming manager	Date of appointment
Celje	(Slovenia) Tomaž Petrovič	29 August 2017	8th	(Slovenia) Dušan Kosič	1 September 2017
Triglav Kranj	(Slovenia) Anton Žlogar	25 September 2017	10th	(Slovenia) Siniša Brkić	25 September 2017
Krško	(Croatia) Stipe Balajić	28 November 2017	8th	(Slovenia) Alen Ščulac	28 December 2017
Aluminij	(Austria) Slobodan Grubor	22 December 2017	8th	(Slovenia) Oliver Bogatinov	29 December 2017

== League table ==
=== Standings ===
Pos	Team	Pld	W	D	L	GF	GA	GD	Pts	Qualification or relegation
1	Olimpija Ljubljana (C)	36	23	11	2	61	17	+44	80 (Note: Olimpija Ljubljana were ahead of Maribor on head-to-head away goals scored: Olimpija 3 goals, Maribor 1 goal.)	Qualification for the Champions League first qualifying round
2	Maribor	36	24	8	4	76	28	+48	80	Qualification for the Europa League first qualifying round (Note: Olimpija Ljubljana qualified for the Europa League first qualifying round by winning the 2017–18 Slovenian Football Cup. However, since they already qualified for European competition based on their league position, the spot awarded to them as the cup winners was passed to the fourth-placed team.)
3	Domžale	36	22	7	7	79	31	+48	73	Qualification for the Europa League first qualifying round
4	Rudar Velenje	36	15	5	16	50	49	+1	50 (Note: Rudar Velenje were ahead of Celje on head-to-head points: Rudar 9 pts, Celje 3 pts.)	Qualification for the Europa League first qualifying round
5	Celje	36	14	8	14	56	51	+5	50	
6	Gorica	36	14	5	17	40	48	−8	47	
7	Krško	36	9	7	20	36	61	−25	34	
8	Aluminij	36	8	9	19	40	63	−23	33	
9	Triglav Kranj (O)	36	7	7	22	29	68	−39	28	Qualification for the relegation play-offs
10	Ankaran (R)	36	5	11	20	33	84	−51	26	Relegation to Slovenian Second League

Source: PrvaLiga (in Slovene), Soccerway, UEFA.com
Rules for classification: 1) Points; 2) Head-to-head points; 3) Head-to-head goal difference; 4) Head-to-head away goals scored; 5) Goal difference; 6) Goals scored; 7) Away goals scored; 8) Fair play ranking; 9) Draw.
(C) Champions; (O) Play-off winners; (R) Relegated

== Results ==
=== First half of the season ===
Home \ Away	ALU	ANK	CEL	DOM	GOR	KRŠ	MAR	OLI	RUD	TRI
Aluminij		1–1	2–2	0–1	0–3	4–2	2–3	1–2	0–2	2–0
Ankaran	1–1		1–2	1–3	0–2	1–1	1–5	1–3	0–3	0–0
Celje	1–2	4–1		1–1	1–0	0–0	2–1	0–0	2–1	1–1
Domžale	2–2	6–0	4–0		1–1	1–0	0–1	1–0	0–1	6–1
Gorica	1–0	2–2	2–1	1–3		2–1	0–3	0–2	1–0	0–3
Krško	2–0	2–2	3–1	4–2	2–1		0–5	2–4	0–3	1–1
Maribor	1–0	1–0	0–0	0–0	2–1	3–2		1–0	1–0	0–0
Olimpija	4–0	1–0	3–1	1–0	2–1	1–0	0–0		4–0	3–0
Rudar	0–0	3–1	2–1	2–1	2–0	0–1	1–2	0–0		1–2
Triglav Kranj	0–3	1–3	0–2	0–1	1–3	3–1	2–3	0–0	1–2	

Source: PrvaLiga (in Slovene)
Legend: Blue = home team win; Yellow = draw; Red = away team win.

=== Second half of the season ===
Home \ Away	ALU	ANK	CEL	DOM	GOR	KRŠ	MAR	OLI	RUD	TRI
Aluminij		1–1	1–2	1–2	1–0	1–1	0–2	0–2	1–3	3–1
Ankaran	2–1		0–2	0–4	0–2	0–0	0–3	0–3	3–2	2–0
Celje	2–2	7–1		2–1	2–0	5–0	0–4	1–1	1–3	5–2
Domžale	6–1	4–0	1–0		3–0	3–1	1–1	1–1	3–0	3–0
Gorica	1–0	4–1	3–0	4–1		2–0	0–6	0–1	1–1	0–2
Krško	1–2	1–1	0–1	1–2	1–0		1–2	0–1	1–0	2–0
Maribor	0–0	5–1	3–2	1–2	2–0	0–2		2–3	2–2	2–1
Olimpija	5–1	0–0	2–1	1–1	0–0	2–0	1–1		4–0	2–0
Rudar	4–2	2–3	2–1	1–4	0–1	3–0	1–3	1–1		0–1
Triglav Kranj	0–2	2–2	1–0	0–4	1–1	2–0	0–5	0–1	0–2	

Source: PrvaLiga (in Slovene)
Legend: Blue = home team win; Yellow = draw; Red = away team win.

== PrvaLiga play-off ==
A two-legged play-off between Triglav Kranj, the ninth-placed team in the PrvaLiga and Drava Ptuj, the second-placed team in the 2. SNL, was played in June 2018. The winner, Triglav Kranj, secured a place in the 2018–19 PrvaLiga season.

2 June 2018
17:00 CEST

Drava Ptuj	1–2	Triglav Kranj
Rešek 14'	Report	Zec 61'; Poplatnik 81' (pen.)

Ptuj City Stadium, Ptuj
Attendance: 800
Referee: Matej Jug
6 June 2018
16:30 CEST

Triglav Kranj	4–2	Drava Ptuj
Elsner 42'; Poplatnik 44', 81'; Majcen 51'	Report	Bizjak 30', 34'

Stanko Mlakar Stadium, Kranj
Attendance: 1,500
Referee: Dejan Balažič

Triglav Kranj won 6–3 on aggregate.

== Awards ==
=== Annual awards ===
PrvaLiga Player of the Season

- Senijad Ibričić

PrvaLiga U23 Player of the Season

- Luka Zahović

=== PrvaLiga Team of the Season ===

Slovenian PrvaLiga Team of the 2017–18 season – SPINS XI.

Player	Team	Position	Ref.
(Slovenia) Jasmin Handanović	Maribor	Goalkeeper	
(Slovenia) Tilen Klemenčič	Domžale	Defender	
(Slovenia) Elvedin Džinić	Celje	Defender	
(Slovenia) Branko Ilić	Olimpija Ljubljana	Defender	
(Slovenia) Martin Milec	Maribor	Defender	
(Slovenia) Rudi Požeg Vancaš	Celje	Midfielder	
(Portugal) Ricardo Alves	Olimpija Ljubljana	Midfielder	
(Bosnia and Herzegovina) Senijad Ibričić	Domžale	Midfielder	
(Brazil) Marcos Tavares	Maribor	Forward	
(Slovenia) Lovro Bizjak	Domžale	Forward	
(Slovenia) Matej Poplatnik	Triglav Kranj	Forward	

== See also ==
- 2017–18 Slovenian Football Cup
- 2017–18 Slovenian Second League
