= 2018–19 Slovenian PrvaLiga =

Slovenian PrvaLiga
- Season: 2018–19
- Dates: 20 July 2018 – 25 May 2019
- Champions: Maribor (15th title)
- Relegated: Gorica; Krško
- Champions League: Maribor
- Europa League: Olimpija Ljubljana; Domžale; Mura
- Matches: 180
- Goals: 553 (3.07 per match)
- Best player: Rudi Požeg Vancaš
- Top goalscorer: Luka Zahović (18 goals)
- Longest winning run: 5 matches Maribor
- Longest unbeaten run: 17 matches Maribor
- Longest winless run: 10 matches Gorica
- Longest losing run: 7 matches Gorica
- Highest attendance: 12,000; Maribor 1–2 Olimpija
- Lowest attendance: 100; Aluminij 0–0 Gorica
- Total attendance: 263,300
- Average attendance: 1,462

The 2018–19 Slovenian PrvaLiga (also known as the Prva liga Telekom Slovenije for sponsorship reasons) was the 28th edition of the Slovenian PrvaLiga since its establishment in 1991. The season began on 20 July 2018 and ended on 25 May 2019.

== Competition format ==
Each team played 36 matches (18 home and 18 away). Teams played four matches against each other (2 home and 2 away).

== Teams ==
A total of ten teams contested the league, including nine from the 2017–18 Slovenian PrvaLiga and one promoted from the 2017–18 Slovenian Second League.

=== Stadiums and locations ===
Seating capacity only; some stadiums also have standing areas.

Aluminij	Celje	Domžale	Gorica
Aluminij Sports Park	Stadion Z'dežele	Domžale Sports Park	Nova Gorica Sports Park
Capacity: 600	Capacity: 13,059	Capacity: 3,100	Capacity: 3,100
Krško	2018–19 Slovenian PrvaLiga is located in Slovenia		Maribor
Matija Gubec	2018–19 Slovenian PrvaLiga is located in Slovenia		Ljudski vrt
Capacity: 1,470	2018–19 Slovenian PrvaLiga is located in Slovenia		Capacity: 12,702
Mura	Olimpija Ljubljana	Rudar Velenje	Triglav Kranj
Fazanerija City Stadium	Stožice Stadium	Ob Jezeru City Stadium	Stanko Mlakar Stadium
Capacity: 3,782	Capacity: 16,038	Capacity: 1,864	Capacity: 2,060

=== Personnel and kits ===
Team	Manager	Captain	Kit manufacturer	Shirt sponsor
Aluminij	(Slovenia) Oliver Bogatinov	(Slovenia) Matic Vrbanec	Zeus Sport	Talum, Zavarovalnica Sava
Celje	(Slovenia) Dušan Kosič	(Slovenia) Jure Travner	Legea	Droga, Cinkarna
Domžale	(Slovenia) Simon Rožman	(Bosnia and Herzegovina) Senijad Ibričić	Joma	Esad Mulalić s.p.
Gorica	(Slovenia) Saša Kolman	(Slovenia) Alen Jogan	Erreà	Hit, E 3
Krško	(Croatia) Andrej Panadić	(Slovenia) Marko Krajcer	Erima	Kostak, GEN
Maribor	(Slovenia) Darko Milanič	(Brazil) Marcos Tavares	Adidas	Zavarovalnica Sava, Nova KBM, Radio City
Mura	(Slovenia) Ante Šimundža	(Slovenia) Alen Kozar	Adidas	None
Olimpija Ljubljana	(Slovenia) Safet Hadžić	(Slovenia) Nejc Vidmar	Nike	Merkur zavarovalnica
Rudar Velenje	(Slovenia) Almir Sulejmanović	(Slovenia) David Kašnik	Joma	None
Triglav Kranj	(Slovenia) Dejan Dončić	(Slovenia) Elvis Džafić	Peak	Domplan

== League table ==
Pos	Team	Pld	W	D	L	GF	GA	GD	Pts	Qualification or relegation
1	Maribor (C)	36	23	9	4	82	34	+48	78	Qualification for the Champions League first qualifying round
2	Olimpija Ljubljana	36	20	9	7	73	47	+26	69	Qualification for the Europa League first qualifying round (Note: Since the winners of the 2018–19 Slovenian Football Cup, Olimpija Ljubljana, qualified for European competition based on league position, the spot awarded to the cup winners (Europa League first qualifying round) was passed to the fourth-placed team.)
3	Domžale	36	18	9	9	76	47	+29	63	Qualification for the Europa League first qualifying round
4	Mura	36	13	13	10	53	37	+16	52	Qualification for the Europa League first qualifying round
5	Celje	36	12	13	11	45	51	−6	49	
6	Aluminij	36	14	6	16	50	53	−3	48	
7	Rudar Velenje	36	12	7	17	50	73	−23	43	
8	Triglav Kranj	36	10	7	19	51	83	−32	37	
9	Gorica (R)	36	7	10	19	44	63	−19	31	Qualification for the relegation play-offs
10	Krško (R)	36	5	9	22	29	65	−36	24	Relegation to Slovenian Second League

Source: PrvaLiga (in Slovene), Soccerway, UEFA.com
Rules for classification: 1) Points; 2) Head-to-head points; 3) Head-to-head goal difference; 4) Head-to-head away goals scored; 5) Goal difference; 6) Goals scored; 7) Away goals scored; 8) Fair play ranking; 9) Draw.
(C) Champions; (R) Relegated

== Results ==
=== First half of the season ===
Home \ Away	ALU	CEL	DOM	GOR	KRŠ	MAR	MUR	OLI	RUD	TRI
Aluminij		2–1	0–0	0–0	1–0	2–5	0–2	6–2	3–0	2–0
Celje	1–1		0–0	2–2	2–1	0–5	1–0	1–3	2–0	1–3
Domžale	3–1	1–1		3–1	2–0	1–2	2–2	1–2	3–1	1–2
Gorica	0–1	1–1	1–0		1–0	0–3	2–2	2–0	2–2	1–1
Krško	1–3	1–1	0–4	1–0		0–2	2–0	0–0	0–0	1–1
Maribor	2–1	1–1	2–2	5–0	3–0		0–0	1–2	3–0	4–1
Mura	3–2	0–1	5–1	1–0	0–1	4–1		0–2	2–1	1–1
Olimpija	3–1	2–2	4–4	2–2	1–1	0–3	2–2		5–0	2–0
Rudar	3–2	0–1	2–1	0–2	1–1	0–5	3–2	1–2		3–1
Triglav Kranj	1–3	1–2	1–4	2–4	4–3	1–5	3–0	0–4	1–2	

Source: PrvaLiga (in Slovene)
Legend: Blue = home team win; Yellow = draw; Red = away team win.

=== Second half of the season ===
Home \ Away	ALU	CEL	DOM	GOR	KRŠ	MAR	MUR	OLI	RUD	TRI
Aluminij		4–1	0–3	3–1	1–1	0–1	0–1	1–0	4–0	2–1
Celje	1–0		2–3	4–3	0–0	1–3	0–2	1–0	0–2	4–0
Domžale	3–0	1–1		2–1	2–1	2–1	1–1	1–3	6–2	6–1
Gorica	0–0	4–0	2–1		1–2	1–3	0–1	1–3	1–2	1–2
Krško	1–3	1–1	1–2	3–2		0–1	0–3	1–4	1–2	1–3
Maribor	1–1	1–1	1–0	2–1	2–0		1–1	0–3	3–1	3–3
Mura	3–0	1–1	0–0	3–0	5–0	2–2		0–0	3–3	0–0
Olimpija	2–0	2–0	1–4	3–1	3–2	0–0	1–0		3–3	4–2
Rudar	3–0	0–3	1–2	2–2	1–0	1–3	1–0	1–2		2–2
Triglav Kranj	3–0	0–3	1–4	1–1	3–1	1–2	2–1	2–1	0–4	

Source: PrvaLiga (in Slovene)
Legend: Blue = home team win; Yellow = draw; Red = away team win.

== PrvaLiga play-off ==
A two-legged play-off between the ninth-placed team in the PrvaLiga and the second-placed team in the 2. SNL was played. The winner (Tabor Sežana) secured a place in the 2019–20 PrvaLiga season.

29 May 2019
17:00 CEST

Tabor Sežana	2–1	Gorica
Stevanović 14'; Azinović 40'	Report	Velikonja 16' (pen.)

Rajko Štolfa Stadium, Sežana
Attendance: 800
Referee: Nejc Kajtazović
2 June 2019
17:00 CEST

Gorica	0–0	Tabor Sežana
	Report

Nova Gorica Sports Park, Nova Gorica
Attendance: 2,500
Referee: Rade Obrenović

Tabor Sežana won 2–1 on aggregate.

== Awards ==
=== Player of the Month ===
Month	Player	Club
August	(Slovenia) Amir Dervišević	Maribor
September	(Slovenia) Dino Hotić	Maribor
October	(Slovenia) Andrés Vombergar	Olimpija
November	(Albania) Francesco Tahiraj	Aluminij
March	(Slovenia) Luka Majcen	Triglav

=== Annual awards ===
PrvaLiga Player of the Season

- Rudi Požeg Vancaš

PrvaLiga U23 Player of the Season

- Jan Mlakar

PrvaLiga Manager of the Season

- Ante Šimundža

=== PrvaLiga Team of the Season ===

Slovenian PrvaLiga Team of the 2018–19 season – SPINS XI.

Player	Team	Position	Ref.
(Croatia) Matko Obradović	Mura	Goalkeeper	
(Slovenia) Tilen Klemenčič	Domžale	Defender	
(Slovenia) Klemen Šturm	Mura	Defender	
(Serbia) Saša Ivković	Maribor	Defender	
(Slovenia) Martin Milec	Maribor	Defender	
(Slovenia) Rudi Požeg Vancaš	Celje	Midfielder	
(Slovenia) Amir Dervišević	Maribor	Midfielder	
(Bosnia and Herzegovina) Senijad Ibričić	Domžale	Midfielder	
(Slovenia) Luka Majcen	Triglav Kranj	Forward	
(Slovenia) Rok Sirk	Mura	Forward	
(Slovenia) Jan Mlakar	Maribor	Forward	

== See also ==
- 2018–19 Slovenian Football Cup
- 2018–19 Slovenian Second League
