= Eternal derby of Slovenian football (2007) =

NK Maribor–NK Olimpija Ljubljana rivalry

Večni derbi
- Other names: Slovenski derbi
- Location: Ljubljana – Maribor, Slovenia
- Teams: Maribor; Olimpija
- First meeting: 24 October 2007; Slovenian Cup; Maribor 3–1 Bežigrad
- Latest meeting: 31 October 2026; Slovenian PrvaLiga; Maribor 0–1 Olimpija
- Next meeting: 20 February 2027; Slovenian PrvaLiga; Olimpija vs Maribor
- Stadiums: Ljudski vrt (Maribor); Stožice (Olimpija)

Statistics
- Total meetings: 84
- Most wins: Maribor (32)
- Most player appearances: Marcos Tavares (57)
- Top scorer: Marcos Tavares (9)
- Largest victory: Olimpija 4–1 Maribor (28 August 2011); Maribor 4–1 Olimpija (29 April 2015)

The Eternal derby of Slovenian football, simply known as the Eternal derby (Slovene: Večni derbi) or Slovenian derby (Slovene: Slovenski derbi), is a football rivalry between NK Maribor and NK Olimpija Ljubljana. The match between the two rivals was first contested on 24 October 2007 in a quarter-final match of the Slovenian Cup, which was won by Maribor 3–1.

Location of both teams

== History and rivalry culture ==
Olimpija was founded in March 2005 under the name NK Bežigrad. They later changed their name twice, first to NK Olimpija Bežigrad and finally to NK Olimpija Ljubljana. Although the board of the newly established club and its fans see the team as the spiritual continuation of the old club, they are not regarded as the legal successors of the old NK Olimpija by the Football Association of Slovenia.

However, because the new Olimpija is supported by most of the fans of the previous Olimpija, including their ultras group, Green Dragons, who have a long-standing rivalry with Maribor's own ultras group Viole Maribor, many see the matches between Maribor and the new club as the continuation of the rivalry and refer to it by the same name. The first match between NK Maribor and the new NK Olimpija took place on 24 October 2007 in a Slovenian Cup quarter-final match, won by Maribor 3–1. At the time, Olimpija was still competing under the name NK Olimpija Bežigrad.

== Fans ==
Besides the city of Maribor itself and the surrounding area, NK Maribor also has a large fan base in the whole regions of Lower Styria and Slovenian Carinthia. Olimpija on the other hand inherited much of the fan base that belonged to the dissolved club and draws much of its fans from the central part of the country, the majority from the city of Ljubljana with the surrounding area of southern Upper Carniola and northwestern Lower Carniola. Overall, the two clubs have always been the most popular football clubs in the country.

Both clubs always have support on their matches from ultras groups called Viole Maribor, supporting NK Maribor, and Green Dragons who supports NK Olimpija. The two groups are among the largest in the country and it is not uncommon that the matches between the two clubs were sometimes interrupted by clashes between the two groups or with the police. On many occasions, before or after the matches, the fans of the two clubs would also meet up and fight on the streets. One of the worst incidents occurred in April 2010 after a match, when a member of the Green Dragons was stabbed after a group of his friends got into a fight with members of Viole at the Ljubljana railway station. However, to date, there has not been any fatalities in the country related to football violence.

== Honours ==
Official statistics of honours won by NK Maribor and NK Olimpija as listed by the Football Association of Slovenia.

Major honours won
Competition	Maribor	Olimpija
1. SNL	16	4
Slovenian Cup	9	4
Slovenian Supercup	4	0
Total	29	8

== Head-to-head ==
=== Matches ===
==== Slovenian PrvaLiga ====
Host	Maribor						Olimpija					
Season	Round	Date	Venue	Attendance	Score	Report	Round	Date	Venue	Attendance	Score	Report
2009–10	4	8 August 2009	Ljudski vrt	6,000	1–0	Rep.	13	17 October 2009	ŽŠD Ljubljana	2,000	0–1	Rep.
2009–10	22	9 December 2009	Ljudski vrt	2,500	2–1	Rep.	31	16 April 2010	ŽŠD Ljubljana	2,000	1–1	Rep.
2010–11	13	16 October 2010	Ljudski vrt	8,000	0–0	Rep.	4	29 September 2010	Stožice	10,000	0–1	Rep.
2010–11	31	4 May 2011	Ljudski vrt	9,500	2–2	Rep.	22	12 March 2011	Stožice	5,000	0–0	Rep.
2011–12	16	30 October 2011	Ljudski vrt	12,500	2–2	Rep.	7	28 August 2011	Stožice	8,000	4–1	Rep.
2011–12	34	12 May 2012	Ljudski vrt	10,000	3–2	Rep.	25	21 March 2012	Stožice	8,000	1–2	Rep.
2012–13	14	20 October 2012	Ljudski vrt	9,000	1–0	Rep.	5	11 August 2012	Stožice	5,500	0–0	Rep.
2012–13	32	11 May 2013	Ljudski vrt	9,000	2–1	Rep.	23	10 March 2013	Stožice	2,000	1–1	Rep.
2013–14	13	6 October 2013	Ljudski vrt	6,500	2–0	Rep.	4	2 March 2014	Stožice	5,000	0–3	Rep.
2013–14	31	3 May 2014	Ljudski vrt	5,500	2–0	Rep.	22	15 March 2014	Stožice	100 (Note: The match was played behind closed doors.)	2–0	Rep.
2014–15	12	4 October 2014	Ljudski vrt	10,000	3–3	Rep.	3	8 April 2015	Stožice	5,000	0–0	Rep.
2014–15	30	29 April 2015	Ljudski vrt	8,500	4–1	Rep.	21	4 March 2015	Stožice	6,500	0–1	Rep.
2015–16	6	16 August 2015	Ljudski vrt	10,000	0–3	Rep.	15	21 November 2015	Stožice	13,500	2–2	Rep.
2015–16	24	5 March 2016	Ljudski vrt	12,160	0–0	Rep.	33	7 May 2016	Stožice	14,000	1–2	Rep.
2016–17	4	8 August 2016	Ljudski vrt	11,000	1–1	Rep.	13	15 October 2016	Stožice	13,770	1–3	Rep.
2016–17	22	25 February 2017	Ljudski vrt	12,000	1–0	Rep.	31	29 April 2017	Stožice	7,000	0–0	Rep.
2017–18	16	17 November 2017	Ljudski vrt	9,000	1–0	Rep.	7	27 August 2017	Stožice	13,000	0–0	Rep.
2017–18	34	19 May 2018	Ljudski vrt	12,166	2–3	Rep.	25	31 March 2018	Stožice	12,000	1–1	Rep.
2018–19	14	27 October 2018	Ljudski vrt	12,000	1–2	Rep.	5	19 August 2018	Stožice	8,600	0–3	Rep.
2018–19	32	11 May 2019	Ljudski vrt	12,000	0–3	Rep.	23	16 March 2019	Stožice	9,500	0–0	Rep.
2019–20	3	28 July 2019	Ljudski vrt	6,600	0–0	Rep.	12	28 September 2019	Stožice	7,000	2–4	Rep.
2019–20	21	22 February 2020	Ljudski vrt	9,000	1–1	Rep.	30	28 June 2020	Stožice	70 (Note: The match was played behind closed doors due to the COVID-19 pandemic in Slovenia.)	1–0	Rep.
2020–21	6	4 October 2020	Ljudski vrt	0	1–1	Rep.	15	3 December 2020	Stožice	0	2–0	Rep.
2020–21	24	27 February 2021	Ljudski vrt	0	1–1	Rep.	33	9 May 2021	Stožice	0	0–0	Rep.
2021–22	12	2 October 2021	Ljudski vrt	6,600	0–0	Rep.	3	1 August 2021	Stožice	3,500	3–1	Rep.
2021–22	30	9 April 2022	Ljudski vrt	8,250	1–0	Rep.	21	13 February 2022	Stožice	750 (Note: The match was played at reduced capacity due to the COVID-19 pandemic in Slovenia.)	1–0	Rep.
2022–23	4	7 August 2022	Ljudski vrt	7,000	0–2	Rep.	13	15 October 2022	Stožice	8,000	1–0	Rep.
2022–23	22	19 February 2023	Ljudski vrt	9,611	2–0	Rep.	31	16 April 2023	Stožice	9,129	2–0	Rep.
2023–24	17	3 December 2023	Ljudski vrt	7,500	3–1	Rep.	8	16 September 2023	Stožice	5,380	2–1	Rep.
2023–24	35	11 May 2024	Ljudski vrt	10,460	2–1	Rep.	26	17 April 2024	Stožice	6,345	1–2	Rep.
2024–25	6	25 August 2024	Ljudski vrt	9,650	1–1	Rep.	15	10 November 2024	Stožice	9,845	0–0	Rep.
2024–25	24	9 March 2025	Ljudski vrt	9,500	1–0	Rep.	33	3 May 2025	Stožice	9,000	1–2	Rep.
2025–26	16	23 November 2025	Ljudski vrt	8,900	1–1	Rep.	7	31 August 2025	Stožice	5,500	1–0	Rep.
2025–26	34 (Note: The match was abandoned after 52 minutes due to spectators riots and was registered as 3–0 to Olimpija.)	9 May 2026	Ljudski vrt	6,500	0–3	Rep.	25	8 March 2026	Stožice	6,700	0–0	Rep.
2026–27	14	31 October 2026	Ljudski vrt	9,600	0–1	Rep.	5	15 August 2026	Stožice	6,000	1–1	Rep.
2026–27	32	24 April 2027	Ljudski vrt				23	20 February 2027	Stožice			

• Total: Maribor 26 wins (37%), 27 draws (39%), Olimpija 17 wins (24%).

==== Slovenian Cup ====
Season	Round	Leg	Date	Venue	Attendance	Host	Score	Winner	Report
2007–08	Quarter-final	—	24 October 2007	Ljudski vrt	3,500	Maribor	3–1	Maribor	Rep.
2009–10	Round of 16	—	21 October 2009	ŽŠD Ljubljana	1,700	Olimpija	0–1	Maribor	Rep.
2012–13	Quarter-final	First	27 February 2013	Stožice	4,000	Olimpija	1–3	Maribor	Rep.
2012–13	Quarter-final	Second	6 March 2013	Ljudski vrt	5,000	Maribor	0–1	Maribor	Rep.
2013–14	Semi-final	First	26 March 2014	Ljudski vrt	7,000	Maribor	1–0	Maribor	Rep.
2013–14	Semi-final	Second	2 April 2014	Stožice	4,000	Olimpija	1–1	Maribor	Rep.
2016–17	Semi-final	First	5 April 2017	Stožice	6,000	Olimpija	2–1	Olimpija	Rep.
2016–17	Semi-final	Second	12 April 2017	Ljudski vrt	10,500	Maribor	1–1	Olimpija	Rep.
2017–18	Quarter-final	First	11 November 2017	Stožice	7,000	Olimpija	3–0	Olimpija	Rep.
2017–18	Quarter-final	Second	29 November 2017	Ljudski vrt	3,000	Maribor	1–1	Olimpija	Rep.
2018–19	Final	—	30 May 2019	Stadion Z'dežele (N)	8,623	Olimpija	2–1	Olimpija	Rep.
2022–23	Final	—	6 May 2023	Stadion Z'dežele (N)	9,217	Olimpija	2–1	Olimpija	Rep.

• Series won: Maribor 4 (50%), Olimpija 4 (50%).

==== Slovenian Supercup ====
Season	Date	Venue	Attendance	Host	Score	Winner	Report
2012	8 July 2012	Ljudski vrt	4,150	Olimpija	1–2	Maribor	Rep.
2013	7 July 2013	Arena Petrol (N)	1,800	Maribor	3–0	Maribor	Rep.

• Series won: Maribor 2 (100%), Olimpija 0 (0%).

=== Statistics ===
The table below is accurate as of match played 31 October 2026.

	Maribor wins	Draws	Olimpija wins
1. SNL
At Maribor home	15	13	7
At Olimpija home	11	14	10
Total	26	27	17
Slovenian Cup
At Maribor home	2	2	1
At Olimpija home	2	1	2
Neutral field	0	0	2
Total	4	3	5
Slovenian Supercup
At Maribor home (Note: Olimpija Ljubljana was officially selected as the home team during the 2012 Slovenian Supercup, with a draw. However, the match was played at Ljudski vrt stadium in Maribor, the home of NK Maribor.)	1	0	0
At Olimpija home	0	0	0
Neutral field	1	0	0
Total	2	0	0
Total
84	32	30	22

=== League ranking ===
- The head-to-head ranking table shows the results of NK Maribor and NK Olimpija, when they played in the same division.
- Maribor's positions are marked with a purple background, while Olimpija's positions are marked with a green background.

Position	2009–10	2010–11	2011–12	2012–13	2013–14	2014–15	2015–16	2016–17	2017–18	2018–19	2019–20	2020–21	2021–22	2022–23	2023–24	2024–25	2025–26
1		1	1	1	1	1	1	1	1	1			1	1		1	
2	2		2	2			2		2	2	2	2			2	2	
3								3			3	3	3	3	3		
4	4	4				4											4
5																	5
6																	
7					7												
8																	
9																	
10																	

• Total: Maribor 12 times higher (71%), Olimpija 5 times higher (29%).
