= Ekipa =

Ekipa may refer to:

- Ekipa (TV series), a 2007 Polish television drama series
- Ekipa (Slovenia), a Slovenian sports daily established in 1995
