= Eternal derby (Slovenia) =

Football rivalry between NK Maribor and NK Olimpija

The Eternal derby of Slovenian football, simply known as the Eternal derby (Slovene: Večni derbi) or Slovenian derby (Slovene: Slovenski derbi), was a football rivalry between NK Maribor and NK Olimpija, which was dissolved in 2005.

On 2 March 2005, a new club was established under the name NK Bežigrad, retaining Olimpija's fans, colours and most of the youth team players. NK Bežigrad later changed its name twice, first to NK Olimpija Bežigrad and finally to NK Olimpija Ljubljana. Although the board of the newly established club and its fans see the team as the spiritual continuation of the old club, they are not regarded as the legal successors of the old NK Olimpija by the Football Association of Slovenia.

However, since the new Olimpija is supported by most of the old Olimpija's fans, including their ultras group Green Dragons, which has a long-standing rivalry with Maribor's own ultras group Viole Maribor, many see the matches between Maribor and the new club as the continuation of the rivalry and refer to it by the same name.

== See also ==
- Eternal derby of Slovenian football (1962–2004)
- Eternal derby of Slovenian football (2007)
