= Bojan Prašnikar =

Slovenian footballer (born 1953)

Personal information
- Date of birth: 3 February 1953 (age 73)
- Place of birth: Šmartno ob Paki, PR Slovenia, Yugoslavia
- Height: 1.91 m (6 ft 3 in)
- Position: Forward

Senior career*
| Years | Team | Apps | (Gls) |
| 1969–1976 | Šmartno | | |
| 1976–1977 | Olimpija | | |
| 1977–1983 | Šmartno | | |
| 1983–1984 | SVG Bleiburg | | |

Managerial career
- 1984–1989: Elkroj
- 1989–1991: Celje
- 1991–1992: Mura
- 1991–1993: Slovenia
- 1993–1994: Olimpija
- 1995–1996: Rudar Velenje
- 1996–2000: Maribor
- 1998: Slovenia
- 2000–2001: Olimpija
- 2001–2002: Maribor
- 2002–2004: Slovenia
- 2004–2005: Mura
- 2005–2006: AEL Limassol
- 2006–2007: Primorje
- 2007–2009: Energie Cottbus
- 2010–2011: Rudar Velenje
- 2011–2012: Olimpija Ljubljana
- * Club domestic league appearances and goals

Bojan Prašnikar (born 3 February 1953) is a Slovenian football manager and former player who played as a forward. Prašnikar managed the Slovenia national team three times, between 1991 and 1993, in 1998, and between 2002 and 2004.

== Playing career ==
Prašnikar started his professional football career at his home town club Šmartno ob Paki, where he was the top scorer of the Slovenian Republic League in the 1975–76 season. After the season, he moved to Olimpija of Yugoslav First League, spending only one year there before returning to Šmartno, where he played for the next six seasons. During this period he was the league's top scorer on three occasions and won the Slovenian national league title in 1981. In 1983, he transferred to SVG Bleiburg of Austria where he played for one season before retiring.

== Coaching career ==
After retirement, Prašnikar focused on coaching, starting his managerial career at Elkroj, before moving on to coach various other clubs – Celje, Mura, Olimpija, and Rudar Velenje. His most successful spell however, came while in charge of Maribor from 1996 to 2000. Under his guidance, the club won the Slovenian league four times and qualified for the group phase of the UEFA Champions League (the only Slovenian club to ever achieve this), after defeating Genk and Lyon in the qualifying rounds.

Prašnikar was the manager of the Slovenia national team during three time spans. After Slovenia's independence in 1991 he was named the first head coach of the national team. He remained in the position until December 1993, when Zdenko Verdenik took charge of the Slovenian affairs until the end of the unsuccessful qualifying campaign for the FIFA World Cup 1998. Prašnikar was re-installed head coach in December 1997, but his second spell at the helm of Slovenia lasted for only four month as in April 1998 he resigned due to his commitments with Maribor on club-level. He was replaced by Srečko Katanec.

His third spell in charge of the Slovenian national team started in July 2002, when the Football Association of Slovenia appointed him the successor of Katanec after the disappointing first round finish of the national team at the FIFA World Cup 2002 and Katanec's swift resignation. This job lasted until May 2004. Not qualified for the 2004 European Football Championship tournament, the Slovenian FA replaced Prašnikar with Branko Oblak, who was the head coach of the Slovenia under-21 at that time.

On 28 September 2007, he was appointed by Bundesliga outfit Energie Cottbus, who had parted company with head coach Petrik Sander five days earlier. Prašnikar, who was in charge of Primorje in the Slovenian league before that, signed a deal until June 2010 with the former German Cup finalist. On 30 May 2009, Prašnikar announced his leaving at the end of the season from Energie Cottbus, his last game was the 2008–09 Bundesliga relegation playoff game on 31 May 2009 against 1. FC Nürnberg which he lost 5–0 on aggregate. On 6 April 2010, Prašnikar signed a contract until the end of the season with Slovenian team Rudar Velenje.

In April 2012, Prašnikar was dismissed by Olimpija Ljubljana after only eleven league games in charge.

== Personal life ==
His son Luka and daughter Lara are both footballers.
