= Slovenian PrvaLiga =

Men's association football top division of Slovenia

- Organising body: Football Association of Slovenia
- Founded: 1991; 35 years ago
- Country: Slovenia
- Confederation: UEFA
- Number of clubs: 10
- Level on pyramid: 1
- Relegation to: Slovenian Second League
- Domestic cup: Slovenian Cup
- International cups: UEFA Champions League; UEFA Europa League; UEFA Conference League
- Current champions: Celje (3rd title) (2025–26)
- Most championships: Maribor (16 titles)
- Most appearances: Sebastjan Gobec (488)
- Top scorer: Marcos Tavares (159)
- Broadcasters: Sportklub; Šport TV
- Website: nzs.si
- Current: 2026–27 Slovenian PrvaLiga

The Slovenian PrvaLiga (Slovene: Prva slovenska nogometna liga, pronounced [ˈpərʋa slɔˈʋeːnska nɔɡɔˈmetna ˈliːɡa]), currently named Prva liga Telemach due to sponsorship reasons, also known by the abbreviation 1. SNL, is the top level of the Slovenian football league system. Contested by ten clubs, it operates on a system of promotion and relegation with the Slovenian Second League (2. SNL). Seasons typically run from July to May with each team playing 36 matches.

The competition was founded in 1991, after Slovenia became an independent country. From 1920 until the end of the 1990–91 season, the Slovenian Republic League was a lower division within the Yugoslav league system, although the top Slovenian clubs usually competed in the highest levels of the Yugoslav league system. The league is governed by the Football Association of Slovenia. Celje and Maribor are the only two founding clubs that have never been relegated from the league since its foundation in 1991.

48 clubs have competed since the inception of the PrvaLiga in 1991. Eight of them have won the title: Maribor (16), Gorica (4), Olimpija (4), Olimpija Ljubljana (4), Celje (3), Domžale (2), Koper (1), and Mura (1). Maribor are the competition's most successful club and the only Slovenian side to have reached the UEFA Champions League group stage, doing so in 1999–2000, 2014–15 and 2017–18. In 2025, Celje became the first Slovenian club to appear in the quarter-finals of a major UEFA competition when they reached the last eight of the 2024–25 UEFA Conference League.

== History ==
=== Origins and formation (1991–1996) ===
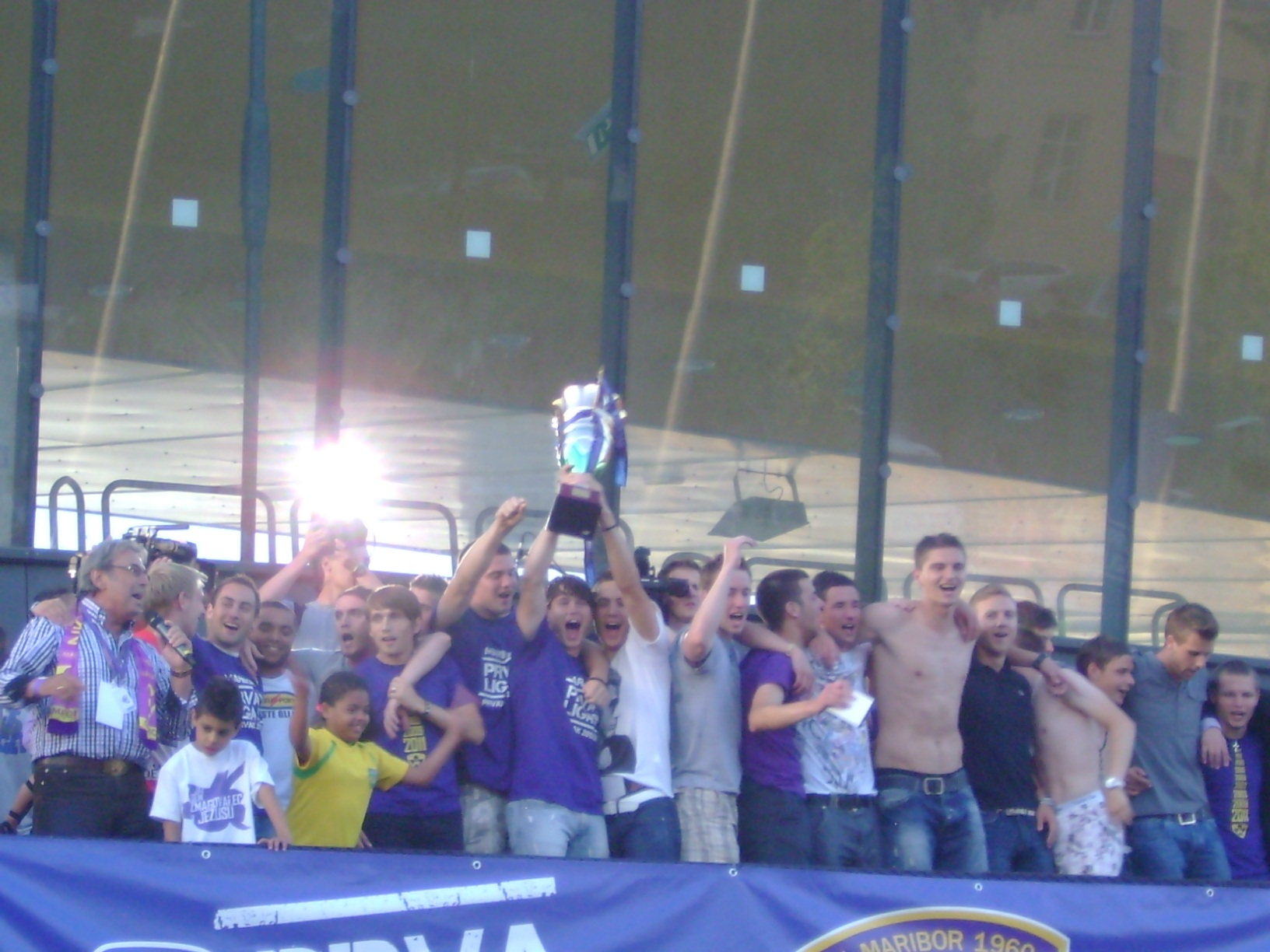
PrvaLiga trophy being lifted after Maribor's ninth league title in 2011.

The Slovenian First League was established in 1991 following Slovenia's independence and the separation of the Football Association of Slovenia from the Yugoslav football authorities. Before independence, most Slovenian clubs competed in the Slovenian Republic League, while Olimpija, Maribor and Nafta were the only Slovenian clubs to appear in the Yugoslav First League after the Second World War.

The inaugural 1991–92 season began in late August 1991 with 21 clubs, by far the largest field in the league's history. Olimpija, whose squad retained considerable experience from Yugoslav top-flight football, won the first championship and went on to take the first four PrvaLiga titles. During the inaugural season, Olimpija also recorded a 12–0 victory over Jadran Dekani, which remains the largest winning margin in the competition's history.

The size and structure of the league changed rapidly during its early years. The field was reduced from 21 clubs to 18 and then 16, before the 1995–96 season became the first to feature ten teams. That season also ended Olimpija's opening dominance when Gorica won their first national championship. As of 2026, Celje and Maribor are the only clubs from the inaugural season to have remained continuously in the top flight.

=== Maribor, Gorica and Domžale (1996–2008) ===
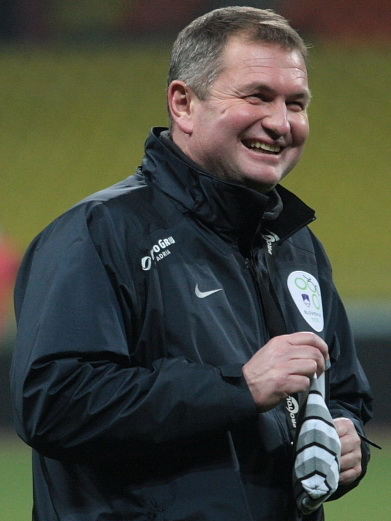
Matjaž Kek won the PrvaLiga title as both a player and manager.

Gorica's breakthrough was followed by the first long period of Maribor dominance. Maribor won their first title in 1996–97 and then became champions in seven consecutive seasons through 2002–03, a PrvaLiga record. Their rise was accompanied by some of the league's strongest attendances: in 1996–97 Maribor averaged more than 5,000 spectators for their home league matches. The period also brought the competition its first major European breakthrough when Maribor qualified for the 1999–2000 UEFA Champions League group stage under Bojan Prašnikar.

Gorica ended Maribor's seven-year title run in 2003–04 and then retained the championship in each of the following two seasons. Coached by Pavel Pinni during their most successful period, Gorica became the first club after Olimpija and Maribor to win three consecutive Slovenian championships. The balance of power changed again in 2006–07, when Domžale, coached by Slaviša Stojanović, won their first title after finishing runners-up in each of the previous two seasons. Domžale retained the title in 2007–08.

Commercial branding also became increasingly visible during this period. In 2006, Telekom Slovenije became the league's title sponsor, beginning a long association under the name Prva liga Telekom Slovenije.

=== Maribor and the renewed Olimpija rivalry (2008–2019) ===
Maribor returned to the top in 2008–09, six years after their previous championship. The revival followed the appointment of former Slovenia international Zlatko Zahovič as sporting director in 2007 and developed into the club's second dominant era. Koper interrupted the sequence by winning their first title in 2009–10, but Maribor then won five consecutive championships from 2010–11 through 2014–15.

The same period established Maribor as Slovenia's most successful representative in UEFA club competition. They reached the UEFA Europa League group stage in 2011–12 and 2012–13, progressed to the round of 32 in 2013–14 and returned to the Champions League group stage in 2014–15. Maribor later made a third Champions League group-stage appearance in 2017–18, having first reached that stage in 1999–2000.

At domestic level, Olimpija Ljubljana emerged as Maribor's principal challenger. Founded in 2005 as a phoenix club of the original Olimpija, which was dissolved due to high debt in the same year, they had returned to the top flight in 2009 and ultimately won the 2015–16 title, ending Maribor's five-year championship run. Maribor regained the championship in 2016–17, before Olimpija won again in 2017–18 and completed a domestic double under Igor Bišćan. Maribor answered with another title in 2018–19, their 15th since independence.

=== More competitive era (2019–present) ===
The 2019–20 season marked a major change in the competitive landscape. The campaign was interrupted by the COVID-19 pandemic and eventually concluded in July 2020. Celje secured the first league title in club history on the final day with a 2–2 draw against direct rivals Olimpija. A year later, Mura won their first championship by beating Maribor in the decisive final-round match at Ljudski vrt.

Maribor returned to the top in 2021–22, winning at Mura on the final day to claim a record-extending 16th championship. Olimpija dominated the following season and secured the 2022–23 title with five rounds remaining by defeating Maribor 2–0 in the Eternal derby.

Celje won their second title in 2023–24, confirming the championship with a home victory over Olimpija in front of more than 7,000 spectators. Olimpija regained the title in 2024–25, clinching first place with a 5–0 victory over Radomlje in the penultimate round. Celje responded in 2025–26 by securing their third championship with five rounds still to play, having also become the first Slovenian side to reach a major UEFA quarter-final during the previous season.

== Competition format ==
=== Competition ===
PrvaLiga is contested on a round-robin basis. Each team plays every other team four times, twice at home and twice away, for a total of 36 matches per club. Teams receive three points for a win, one point for a draw and no points for a loss. Teams are ranked by total points; if teams are level, head-to-head results are used as the first tiebreaking criterion.

=== European qualification and relegation ===
At the end of the season, the highest-placed clubs qualify for the qualifying rounds of the UEFA Champions League and UEFA Conference League, subject to Slovenia's UEFA access list and the outcome of the Slovenian Football Cup. The ninth-placed club enters the promotion/relegation play-off, while the bottom club is relegated to the Slovenian Second League.

=== Historical formats ===
The current ten-club, quadruple round-robin system has been used since 2005. Between 1993 and 1995, a regular double round-robin format with 16 clubs was used, before a ten-club system was introduced for three seasons until 1998. A triple round-robin with twelve clubs and two direct relegations was then used between 1998 and 2003. In 2003–04 and 2004–05, the league was divided into championship and relegation groups after the regular season.

== Clubs ==
=== 2026–27 season ===
The following clubs compete in the 2026–27 Slovenian PrvaLiga.

Locations of the 2026–27 Slovenian PrvaLiga teams

Note: Table lists clubs in alphabetical order.

Club	Location	Stadium	Capacity	PrvaLiga debut	Titles
Aluminij	Kidričevo	Aluminij Sports Park	1,200	2012–13	0
Bravo	Ljubljana	Stožice Stadium	16,038	2019–20	0
Brinje Grosuplje	Grosuplje	Brinje Football Park	500	2026–27	0
Celje	Celje	Stadion Z'dežele	13,059	1991–92	3
Koper	Koper	Bonifika Stadium	4,047	1991–92	1
Maribor	Maribor	Ljudski vrt	11,709	1991–92	16
Mura	Murska Sobota	Fazanerija City Stadium	4,506	2018–19	1
Nafta 1903	Lendava	Lendava Sports Park	3,000	2024–25	0
Olimpija Ljubljana	Ljubljana	Stožice Stadium	16,038	2009–10	4
Radomlje	Radomlje	Domžale Sports Park	3,100	2014–15	0

== Support and rivalries ==
=== Eternal derby ===
The best-known rivalry in the PrvaLiga is the Eternal derby between Maribor and Olimpija Ljubljana. The fixture reflects the long-standing sporting rivalry between Slovenia's two largest cities and regularly attracts crowds well above the league average. After the original Olimpija was liquidated in 2005 due to high debt, the rivalry continued after the re-established club with the same name reached the top flight in 2009; the first league derby played at Stožice in September 2010 was won 1–0 by Maribor.

The derby has also played a direct role in championship races. In 2001, the match between the two clubs was played in the final round of the season, and at that time, Maribor and Olimpija had four titles each. The match ended in a 1–1 draw at Bežigrad, and Maribor clinched its fifth consecutive league title. In May 2016, Maribor came from behind to beat Olimpija 2–1 at Stožice, keeping the title race alive until the closing rounds. Seven years later, Olimpija defeated Maribor 2–0 at the same stadium to secure the 2022–23 championship with five matches remaining.

=== Attendances and television audience ===
Interest in the league has fluctuated considerably by club and season, with Maribor vs. Olimpija fixtures traditionally providing the largest crowds. Maribor averaged more than 5,000 home spectators during their first championship season in 1996–97. The 2015–16 title race produced a particularly strong rise in interest: the Football Association of Slovenia reported that attendance had exceeded 250,000 before the end of the season, around 40% higher than the previous campaign.

The May 2016 derby between Olimpija and Maribor also set a contemporary television benchmark, with the Football Association reporting a peak audience of 377,115 viewers, representing around 40% of people watching television at that time. In the 2018–19 season, league matches attracted 263,300 spectators in total, an average of 1,462 per match, making it the fourth-best attended season in the competition's history to that point.

== Champions ==
=== List of champions ===
Season	Champions	Runners-up
1991–92	Olimpija	Maribor
1992–93	Olimpija	Maribor
1993–94	Olimpija	NK Mura
1994–95	Olimpija	Maribor
1995–96	Gorica	Olimpija
1996–97	Maribor	Primorje
1997–98	Maribor	NK Mura
1998–99	Maribor	Gorica
1999–2000	Maribor	Gorica
2000–01	Maribor	Olimpija
2001–02	Maribor	Primorje
2002–03	Maribor	Celje
2003–04	Gorica	Olimpija
2004–05	Gorica	Domžale
2005–06	Gorica	Domžale
2006–07	Domžale	Gorica
2007–08	Domžale	Koper
2008–09	Maribor	Gorica

Season	Champions	Runners-up
2009–10	Koper	Maribor
2010–11	Maribor	Domžale
2011–12	Maribor	Olimpija Ljubljana
2012–13	Maribor	Olimpija Ljubljana
2013–14	Maribor	Koper
2014–15	Maribor	Celje
2015–16	Olimpija Ljubljana	Maribor
2016–17	Maribor	Gorica
2017–18	Olimpija Ljubljana	Maribor
2018–19	Maribor	Olimpija Ljubljana
2019–20	Celje	Maribor
2020–21	NŠ Mura	Maribor
2021–22	Maribor	Koper
2022–23	Olimpija Ljubljana	Celje
2023–24	Celje	Maribor
2024–25	Olimpija Ljubljana	Maribor
2025–26	Celje	Koper

=== Performance by club ===
Clubs in italics are defunct.

Club	Winners	Runners-up	Winning seasons	Seasons runner-up
Maribor	16	10	1996–97, 1997–98, 1998–99, 1999–2000, 2000–01, 2001–02, 2002–03, 2008–09, 2010–11, 2011–12, 2012–13, 2013–14, 2014–15, 2016–17, 2018–19, 2021–22	1991–92, 1992–93, 1994–95, 2009–10, 2015–16, 2017–18, 2019–20, 2020–21, 2023–24, 2024–25
Gorica	4	5	1995–96, 2003–04, 2004–05, 2005–06	1998–99, 1999–2000, 2006–07, 2008–09, 2016–17
Olimpija	4	3	1991–92, 1992–93, 1993–94, 1994–95	1995–96, 2000–01, 2003–04
Olimpija Ljubljana	4	3	2015–16, 2017–18, 2022–23, 2024–25	2011–12, 2012–13, 2018–19
Celje	3	3	2019–20, 2023–24, 2025–26	2002–03, 2014–15, 2022–23
Domžale	2	3	2006–07, 2007–08	2004–05, 2005–06, 2010–11
Koper	1	4	2009–10	2007–08, 2013–14, 2021–22, 2025–26
NŠ Mura	1	0	2020–21	—
NK Mura	0	2	—	1993–94, 1997–98
Primorje	0	2	—	1996–97, 2001–02

== International competitions ==
=== Qualification for UEFA competitions ===
PrvaLiga clubs qualify for UEFA competitions through their league position and the Slovenian Football Cup, with the precise entry rounds determined by Slovenia's position in the UEFA association coefficient ranking. The league champion enters the UEFA Champions League qualifying path, while other qualified Slovenian clubs enter the UEFA Conference League or, where applicable under the UEFA access list, the UEFA Europa League.

=== Performance in European competition ===
Stadion Z'dežele during Celje's UEFA Champions League play-off against Slovan Bratislava in August 2026.

Maribor have historically recorded the deepest and most frequent European runs by a PrvaLiga club. They became the first Slovenian team to reach the Champions League group stage in 1999–2000, opening that campaign with a 1–0 away win against Dynamo Kyiv. They returned to the competition's group stage in 2014–15 and 2017–18. In the Europa League, Maribor appeared in the group stage in 2011–12 and 2012–13 and reached the round of 32 in 2013–14.

Olimpija Ljubljana established a more sustained European presence in the 2020s. The club reached the 2023–24 UEFA Europa Conference League group stage and then the knockout phase play-offs of the 2024–25 UEFA Conference League, having finished 14th in the league phase.

Celje then produced the most advanced run by a Slovenian club in a major UEFA competition. In 2024–25, they progressed through the Conference League league phase, eliminated APOEL in the knockout phase play-offs and Lugano in the round of 16, becoming the first Slovenian team to reach a major UEFA quarter-final. They lost 4–3 on aggregate to Fiorentina after a 2–1 home defeat and a 2–2 draw in Florence. Celje reached the Conference League round of 16 again in 2025–26.

Club	Notable UEFA achievement	Season(s)
Maribor	UEFA Champions League group stage	1999–2000, 2014–15, 2017–18
Maribor	UEFA Europa League round of 32	2013–14
Olimpija Ljubljana	UEFA Conference League knockout phase play-offs	2024–25
Celje	UEFA Conference League quarter-finals	2024–25

=== UEFA coefficient ===
Correct as of 31 May 2026. The table shows the position of the Slovenian PrvaLiga, based on its UEFA coefficient country ranking, and the four leagues closest to the PrvaLiga's position (two leagues with a higher coefficient and two with a lower coefficient).

Rank	League	2021–22	2022–23	2023–24	2024–25	2025–26	Coeff.
24	(Serbia) Serbian SuperLiga	9.500	5.375	1.400	3.725	5.750	25.750
25	(Romania) Liga I	2.250	6.250	3.250	7.750	5.750	25.250
26	(Slovenia) Slovenian PrvaLiga	3.000	2.125	3.875	9.093	6.375	24.468
27	Azerbaijan Premier League	4.375	4.000	5.875	2.875	5.812	22.937
28	(Russia) Russian Premier League	5.300	4.333	4.333	4.333	4.333	22.632

== Records and statistics ==
=== Notable records ===
Record	Holder	Figure
Most championships	Maribor	16
Most consecutive championships	Maribor	7 (1996–97 to 2002–03)
Largest league victory	Olimpija	12–0 (vs. Jadran Dekani in 1992)
Most player appearances	Sebastjan Gobec	488
Most player goals	Marcos Tavares	159
Most goals in a season	Zoran Ubavič	29 (1991–92)

=== Appearances ===
Sebastjan Gobec holds the all-time PrvaLiga appearance record with 488 league matches. Marcos Tavares is second with 436 appearances, followed by Dušan Kosič and Janez Strajnar with 421 each.

Rank	Player	Appearances
1	Sebastjan Gobec	488
2	Marcos Tavares	436
3	Dušan Kosič	421
3	Janez Strajnar	421
5	Mitja Viler	411
6	Danijel Brezič	406
7	Simon Sešlar	405
8	Miran Srebrnič	400
9	Dejan Djuranovič	388
10	Andrej Poljšak	381

Source: Slovenian PrvaLiga

=== Top scorers ===
As of 26 May 2026

Rank	Name	Goals	Appearances	Average
1	Marcos Tavares	159	436	0.36
2	Štefan Škaper	130	226	0.58
3	Kliton Bozgo	109	207	0.53
4	Ermin Rakovič	108	269	0.4
5	Milan Osterc	106	276	0.38
5	Rok Kronaveter	106	335	0.32
7	Damir Pekič	103	266	0.39
8	Marko Kmetec	95	271	0.35
9	Dalibor Volaš	92	241	0.38
10	Ismet Ekmečić	90	199	0.45
10	Anton Žlogar	90	300	0.3

== Awards ==
=== Trophy ===
The current trophy is being presented since the 2012–13 season and was designed by Mirko Bratuša, a sculptor from Negova. It depicts a ball with eleven star-shaped holes and inside there are eleven players holding together and looking at the sky. It is made of brass, bronze and gold, and weighs 13 kilograms (29 lb; 2 st 1 lb).

=== Player awards ===
The first Player of the Year awards were presented by Slovenian newspaper Dnevnik in the early 1990s. Between 1996 and 1999, they were presented by Ekipa, and since 2004, the awards have been organized by the Union of Professional Football Players of Slovenia (SPINS).

Player of the Year

- 1991 Miloš Breznikar
- 1992 Vlado Miloševič
- 1993 Gregor Židan
- 1994 Džoni Novak
- 1995 Sandi Valentinčič
- 2004 Damir Pekič and Dražen Žeželj
- 2005 Saša Ranić
- 2006 Ermin Rakovič
- 2007–08 Amer Jukan
- 2008–09 Marcos Tavares
- 2009–10 Miran Pavlin
- 2010–11 Marcos Tavares
- 2011–12 Dare Vršič
- 2012–13 Agim Ibraimi
- 2013–14 Massimo Coda
- 2014–15 Benjamin Verbič
- 2015–16 Rok Kronaveter
- 2016–17 Dare Vršič
- 2017–18 Senijad Ibričić
- 2018–19 Rudi Požeg Vancaš
- 2019–20 Mitja Lotrič
- 2020–21 Senijad Ibričić
- 2021–22 Ognjen Mudrinski
- 2022–23 Žan Vipotnik
- 2023–24 Žan Karničnik
- 2024–25 Raul Florucz
- 2025–26 Josip Iličić

Young player of the Year

- 2011–12 Boban Jović
- 2012–13 Boban Jović
- 2013–14 Martin Milec
- 2014–15 Benjamin Verbič
- 2015–16 Miha Zajc
- 2016–17 Luka Zahović
- 2017–18 Luka Zahović
- 2018–19 Jan Mlakar
- 2019–20 Dario Vizinger
- 2020–21 Timi Max Elšnik
- 2021–22 Tomi Horvat
- 2022–23 Žan Vipotnik
- 2023–24 Yegor Prutsev
- 2024–25 Svit Sešlar
- 2025–26 Leo Rimac

=== Manager awards ===
Manager awards weren't presented between 2012 and 2019.

Manager of the Year

- 2011–12 Darko Milanič
- 2018–19 Ante Šimundža
- 2019–20 Dušan Kosič
- 2020–21 Dejan Djuranović
- 2021–22 Zoran Zeljković
- 2022–23 Albert Riera
- 2023–24 Ante Šimundža
- 2024–25 Víctor Sánchez
- 2025–26 Zoran Zeljković

== Sponsorship and branding ==
=== Competition names ===
Since 1991, the league has been named after sponsors on several occasions, giving it the following names:

Period	Sponsor	Name
1991–1999	No sponsor	1. SNL
1999–2004	Si.mobil	Liga Si.mobil
2004–2006	Si.mobil Vodafone	Liga Si.mobil Vodafone
2006–2009	Telekom Slovenije	Prva liga Telekom Slovenije
2009–2013	No sponsor	Prva liga
2013–2021	Telekom Slovenije	Prva liga Telekom Slovenije
2021–present	Telemach	Prva liga Telemach

== Media coverage ==
During the early years, the league was broadcast only by the national public broadcasting television, RTV Slovenija. From 2008 until 2012, they had joint broadcasts with Šport TV, and from 2013 until 2015 with Planet TV. In the 2015–16 and 2016–17 seasons, the league was broadcast exclusively on Kanal A. In the 2017–18 season, the league was broadcast jointly by Kanal A and Šport TV. In the first round of the season, all five games were broadcast live for the first time in league's history.

Between 2018–19 and 2020–21, the league was broadcast jointly by Planet TV and RTV Slovenija. With the start of the 2019–20 season, one match per week is also broadcast on local Sportklub channels in Bosnia and Herzegovina, Croatia, Montenegro, North Macedonia and Serbia. From 2021–22 onwards, the league has been broadcast by Sportklub and Šport TV; all five matches per round are broadcast live, with Sportklub broadcasting four matches and Šport TV one. The arrangement continued into 2026–27, when all 180 scheduled league matches were again made available live. From the 2022–23 season, the league is also broadcast in Poland on Sportklub Polska.

Country	TV channel
Bosnia and Herzegovina	Sportklub
Croatia	Sportklub
Montenegro	Sportklub
North Macedonia	Sportklub
Poland	Sportklub Polska
Serbia	Sportklub
Slovenia	Sportklub
Slovenia	Šport TV
