= Ažbe Jug =

Slovenian footballer (born 1992)

Personal information
- Date of birth: 3 March 1992 (age 34)
- Place of birth: Maribor, Slovenia
- Height: 1.94 m (6 ft 4 in)
- Position: Goalkeeper

Team information
- Current team: Maribor
- Number: 1

Youth career
- Pohorje
- 2005–2009: Maribor

Senior career*
Years	Team	Apps	(Gls)
2009–2011	Interblock	24	(0)
2011–2015	Bordeaux	3	(0)
2011–2015	Bordeaux II	50	(0)
2015–2017	Sporting CP	0	(0)
2016–2017	Sporting CP B	3	(0)
2019–2020	Fortuna Sittard	0	(0)
2020–	Maribor	194	(0)

International career
2007–2009	Slovenia U17 (Note: Official competitive UEFA matches only.)	7	(0)
2009–2010	Slovenia U19	6	(0)
2011–2012	Slovenia U20	4	(0)
2013–2014	Slovenia U21	15	(0)
- * Club domestic league appearances and goals as of 27 October 2026

Ažbe Jug (born 3 March 1992) is a Slovenian professional footballer who plays as a goalkeeper for Slovenian PrvaLiga club Maribor.
