= 1975–76 Slovenian Republic League =

Slovenian Republic League
- Season: 1975–76
- Champions: Maribor
- Relegated: Slovan; Drava Ptuj; Gorica
- Matches played: 182
- Goals scored: 573 (3.15 per match)

== Final table ==
Pos	Team	Pld	W	D	L	GF	GA	GD	Pts
1	Maribor	26	23	1	2	86	21	+65	47
2	Šmartno	26	13	6	7	50	33	+17	32
3	Primorje	26	12	6	8	42	34	+8	30
4	Železničar Maribor	26	12	6	8	43	38	+5	30
5	Mura	26	11	6	9	43	38	+5	28
6	Izola	26	11	5	10	44	39	+5	27
7	Pohorje	26	10	6	10	26	28	−2	26
8	Rudar Trbovlje	26	10	5	11	35	34	+1	25
9	Slavija Vevče	26	10	5	11	41	61	−20	25
10	Kladivar Celje	26	10	2	14	49	43	+6	22
11	Ilirija	26	7	7	12	33	48	−15	21
12	Slovan	26	3	12	11	34	54	−20	18
13	Drava Ptuj	26	5	8	13	25	50	−25	17 (Note: 1 point deducted)
14	Vozila	26	4	7	15	22	43	−21	14
