= Dušan Kosič =

Slovenian footballer and manager (born 1971)

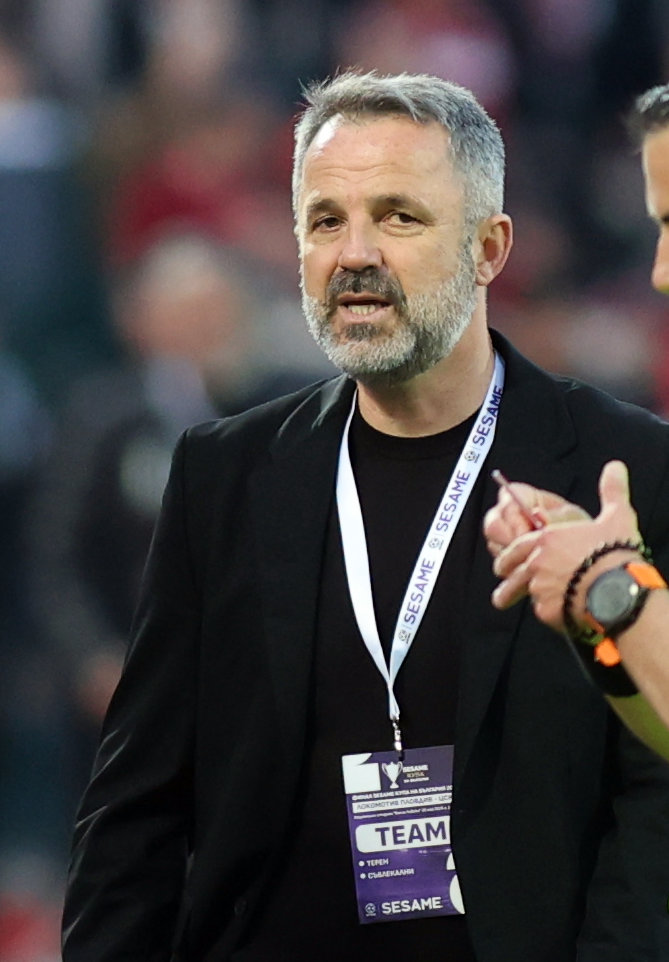
- Kosič in 2026

Personal information
- Full name: Dušan Kosić
- Date of birth: 23 April 1971 (age 55)
- Place of birth: Ljubljana, SR Slovenia, Yugoslavia
- Height: 1.82 m (6 ft 0 in)
- Position: Midfielder

Team information
- Current team: Lokomotiv Plovdiv (head coach)

Senior career*
Years	Team	Apps	(Gls)
1991–1992	Svoboda	38	(16)
1992–1993	Elan	30	(8)
1993–1994	Beltinci	35	(5)
1994–1995	Vevče	18	(6)
1995–1996	Olimpija	21	(3)
1996–1997	Korotan Prevalje	33	(4)
1997–1998	Rudar Velenje	33	(2)
1998–2005	Olimpija	213	(36)
2005–2009	ATUS Ferlach	99	(15)
Total		520	(95)

International career
1992–1994	Slovenia	5	(0)

Managerial career
- 2006–2009: ATUS Ferlach
- 2010–2011: Olimpija Ljubljana
- 2013: Triglav Kranj
- 2013–2017: Slovenia U16/U17
- 2017–2020: Celje
- 2021–2023: Tabor Sežana
- 2023–2024: Domžale
- 2024–: Lokomotiv Plovdiv
- * Club domestic league appearances and goals

Dušan Kosič (born 23 April 1971) is a Slovenian professional football manager and former player who is the manager of Bulgarian club Lokomotiv Plovdiv.

== Club career ==
Kosič is the third-most capped player in the Slovenian PrvaLiga with 421 appearances and had the most appearances for Olimpija (234), winning three Slovenian Cups and one Slovenian Supercup with the club. He also won the cup with Rudar Velenje in 1998.

== International career ==
Kosič made his debut for Slovenia on 18 November 1992 away against Cyprus, coming on as an 80th-minute substitute for Zlatko Zahovič, and earned a total of five caps until his final appearance in 1994.

== Managerial career ==
Between 2006 and 2017, Kosič managed ATUS Ferlach, Olimpija Ljubljana, Triglav Kranj, and the Slovenia under-17 national team.

In August 2017, he was appointed as manager of Celje. In the 2019–20 season, Celje won their first-ever Slovenian championship. For this achievement, Kosič received the Slovenian Manager of the Year award, presented by the Slovenian newspaper EkipaSN. However, he left the club on 21 December 2020 after Celje finished the first part of the 2020–21 season in seventh place.

On 9 September 2021, Kosič was appointed as manager of Tabor Sežana, signing a contract until 2023.

== Honours ==
=== Player ===
Olimpija

- Slovenian Cup: 1995–96, 1999–2000, 2002–03
- Slovenian Supercup: 1995

Rudar Velenje

- Slovenian Cup: 1997–98

=== Manager ===
Celje

- Slovenian PrvaLiga: 2019–20

Personal

- Slovenian Manager of the Year: 2020
