= Viole Maribor =

Sport supporters' group from Slovenia

- Abbreviation: VM89
- Founded: 1989
- Type: Supporters' groups Ultras group
- Team: NK Maribor
- Headquarters: Maribor, Slovenia
- Stadium: Ljudski vrt
- Stand: South
- Colors: Purple, yellow, white
- Website: violemaribor.com

Viole Maribor, or simply Viole, are a Slovenian ultras group that supports NK Maribor. Founded in 1989, they are one of the two major ultras groups in Slovenia, the other being their traditional rivals, Green Dragons, the supporters of NK Olimpija Ljubljana.

The group is known for hooliganism and clashes with the police and fans of other groups, especially with fans of their biggest rivals, Olimpija. Historically, members of Viole Maribor have been affiliated with the nationalist group Hervardi and the nationalist Party of Slovenian People. Among the notable figures associated with Viole is the former leader of the group Andrej Šiško, a political activist and convicted criminal.

== History ==
The first organised support at NK Maribor match occurred on 2 August 1989, when the club played against Spartak Subotica in the Yugoslav Cup. The supporters group was initially called Marinci ("Marines") and consisted mainly of schoolchildren around 14 years old. In 1991, in the last match before Slovenia's independence, the name was changed to Viole Maribor.

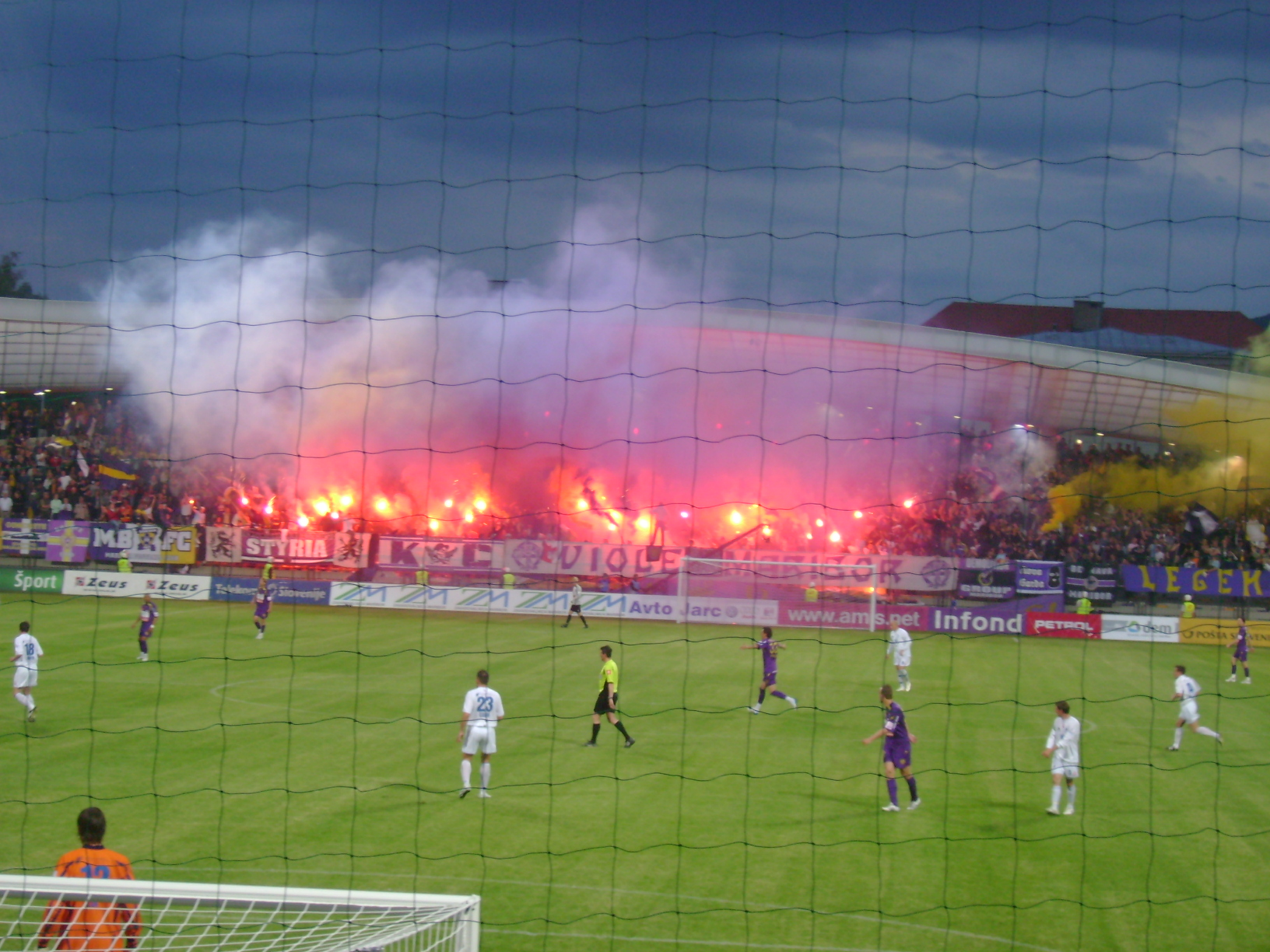
Viole Maribor in the South Stand of Ljudski vrt.

In April 2010, after a derby match between Olimpija Ljubljana and Maribor, Marko Živko, a 27-year-old member of Viole Maribor, stabbed a 23-year-old Green Dragons member under the armpits during a post-match clash in Ljubljana. The attack was treated by the court as attempted manslaughter. Živko denied guilt throughout the trial, and some witnesses recanted their statements, but the Ljubljana District Court found sufficient evidence of intent to kill and sentenced him to seven years in prison.

In 2014, four members of the group were sentenced for violently attacking Sevilla FC fans at the Tepanje motorway rest area following a Europa League match, resulting in injuries and approximately €5,000 in property damage. In the same year, UEFA sanctioned Maribor by ordering the closure of part of their stadium after racist behaviour during European matches.

Viole Maribor has been repeatedly punished by the Football Association of Slovenia (NZS) for incidents at domestic matches. In November 2015, Maribor was fined €15,000 after fans displayed a Celtic cross flag and banners with xenophobic messages during a match against Olimpija Ljubljana. In February 2024, during an away league match against Mura, a stun grenade thrown by a member of Viole injured six Mura players and a 14-year-old ball boy, leading to a €25,000 fine, the match being registered 3–0 for Mura, and a four-match stadium closure for Maribor.
