= NK Maribor =

Association football club in Slovenia

Maribor
- Full name: Nogometni klub Maribor Branik
- Nicknames: Vijoličasti (The Purples); Vijolice (The Violets); Štajerski ponos (The pride of Styria)
- Founded: 12 December 1960; 65 years ago
- Ground: Ljudski vrt
- Capacity: 11,709
- President: Uroš Mlakar
- Head coach: Darko Milanič
- League: Slovenian PrvaLiga
- 2025–26: Slovenian PrvaLiga, 5th of 10
- Website: www.nkmaribor.com
Home colours	Away colours	Third colours

Nogometni klub Maribor (English: Maribor Football Club) is a Slovenian professional football club based in Maribor, Slovenia. It competes in the Slovenian PrvaLiga, the top tier of the Slovenian football league system. Nicknamed "The Purples" (Vijoličasti), the club was founded on 12 December 1960. They are regarded as a symbol of Slovenian football, particularly in their home region of Styria in northeastern Slovenia.

Maribor have won a record 16 Slovenian PrvaLiga titles, 9 Slovenian Cups and 4 Slovenian Supercups. The club won seven consecutive league titles between 1997 and 2003, and five consecutive titles between 2011 and 2015. Prior to Slovenia's independence in 1991, Maribor played in the Yugoslav football system. They won the Yugoslav second division in 1967 and were therefore promoted to the top-level Yugoslav First League, where they stayed until 1972. They are one of three Slovenian teams that participated in the Yugoslavia's highest division between the end of World War II in 1945 and the breakup of Yugoslavia in 1991.

Maribor is the only Slovenian club that reached the group stages of the UEFA Champions League. In addition, the club is one of the two founding members of the Slovenian PrvaLiga (along with Celje) which have never been relegated from the league since the inaugural 1991–92 season.

The club have a long-standing rivalry with Olimpija from the capital Ljubljana, with whom they contest the Eternal derby. Other rivalries include those with Celje, dubbed as the Styrian derby, and the Prekmurje–Styria derby, contested between Maribor and Mura. Maribor's home ground is the Ljudski vrt stadium, which has a capacity of 11,709 seats. The traditional colours of the club are purple, yellow and white.

== History ==
=== Founding and early years (1960–1967) ===
Nogometni klub Maribor was founded on 12 December 1960 by officials and players of NK Branik Maribor, a club that folded a few months earlier. Srečko Koren was appointed the first president of the club, and Andrija Pflander the first head coach. The club played their first friendly match on 5 February 1961 against Kovinar, defeating them 2–1 with two goals by Stefan Tolič. In their first season, Maribor won the Slovenian Republic League (third tier in Yugoslavia) and qualified for the 1961–62 Yugoslav Second League through the play-offs. In 1961, the club also moved to a newly built Ljudski vrt stadium. After six seasons in the second division, Maribor won the league and was promoted to the top flight Yugoslav First League in the 1966–67 season.

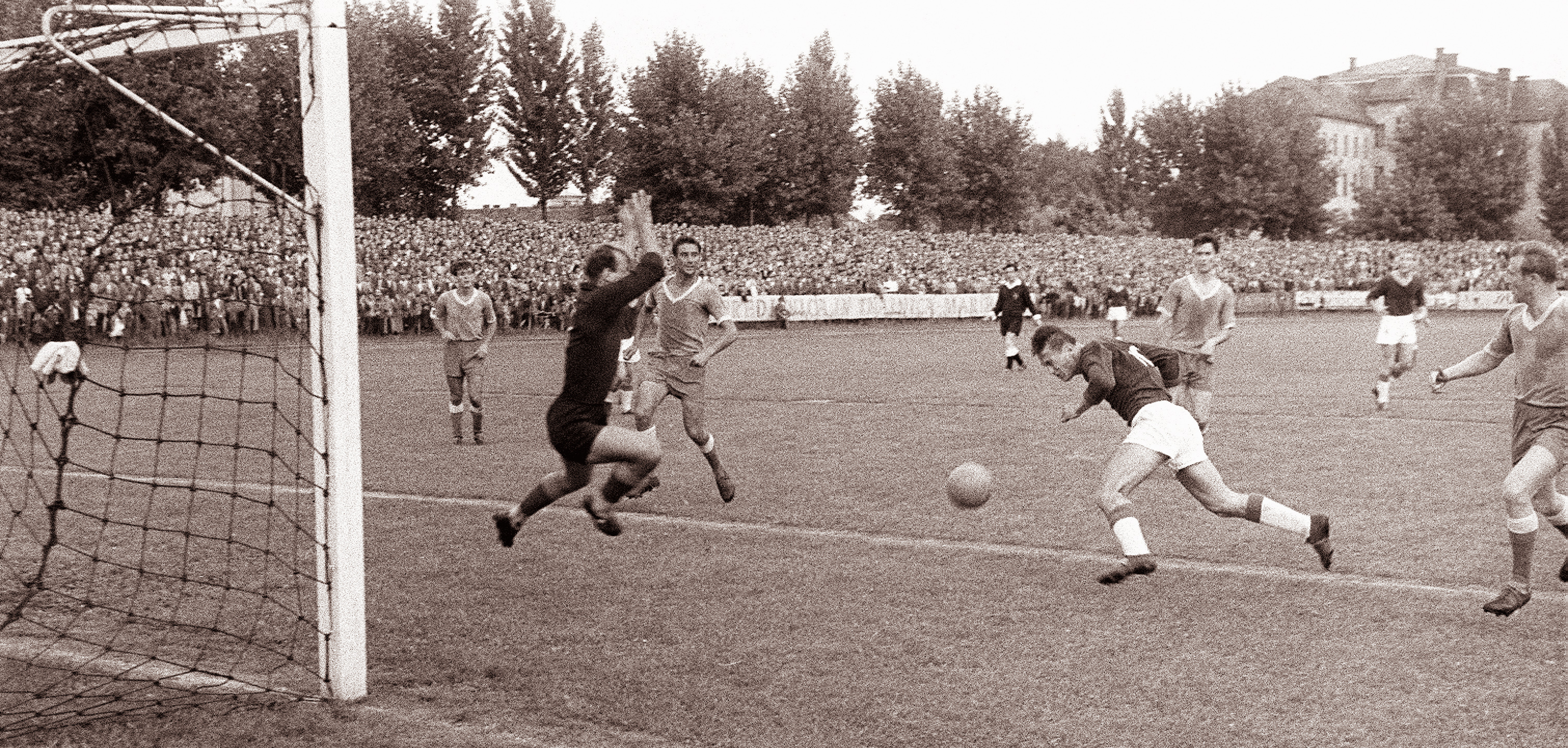
Maribor playing in the promotion play-off against Uljanik in 1961.

=== Yugoslav top division (1967–1972) ===
Maribor played their first match in the Yugoslav top tier against Vardar in Skopje; Maras scored the only goal for Maribor in a 1–1 draw. Their first win came in August 1967, when Maribor defeated Proleter Zrenjanin 3–0 at home. During the season, the first ever match in the Yugoslav top flight involving two clubs from Slovenia was held, when Maribor hosted a goalless match against their rivals Olimpija from Ljubljana in front of 13,000 spectators. Each match between the two sides during this period attracted large crowds, with attendance sometimes as high as 20,000. Maribor finished their inaugural top division season in 12th place out of 16 teams.

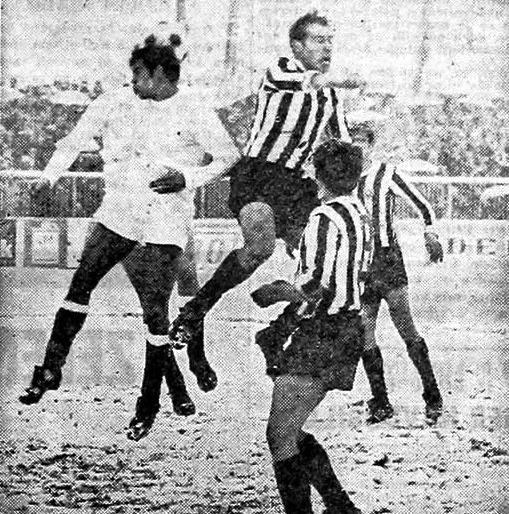
Maribor playing against Partizan in 1969.

In the 1969–70 season, Maribor finished 10th out of 18 clubs, their highest ever ranking in Yugoslav football. Their last season in the top division was 1971–72, when the team finished dead last with just 20 points in 34 matches. Mladen Kranjc was Maribor's top scorer in each of the five Yugoslav top division seasons, scoring a total of 54 league goals, which eventually led to his transfer to one of the top Yugoslav clubs, Dinamo Zagreb. During their five-year stay in Yugoslav's top division, the club played a total of 166 league matches and achieved 40 wins, 57 draws and 69 defeats.

=== Dark years and bribery scandal (1972–1991) ===
In the 1972–73 season, Maribor were competing in the second tier. They finished the season in second place, only behind Zagreb, which meant that they qualified for the Yugoslav first division promotion play-offs. In the first qualifying round against Montenegrin side Budućnost, Maribor won on penalties and qualified for the decisive round against Proleter. The first leg was played at home on 8 July 1973, and is acknowledged as one of the most memorable matches in the history of Maribor, as it still holds the club's home attendance record. There were 20,000 spectators, 15,000 of whom were already present in the stands almost three hours before the start, eventually helping Maribor to win the game 3–1. However, the two-goal advantage proved to be insufficient as Proleter won the second leg 3–0 and was promoted. When the score was 1–0 for Proleter, Josip Ražić equalised in the 23rd minute, but the goal was not awarded by the referee. Later, the television replay showed that the ball had actually crossed the goal line and that the goal should have stood.

The period between 1973 and 1991 is one of the darkest in the club's history. In the following 1973–74 season, the club failed to stay near the top of the second division and finished the season in 13th place. In the 1974–75 season, Maribor were relegated to the third-tier Slovenian Republic League for the first time in 14 years, but the club immediately returned to the second division by being 15 points clear at the top of the Republic League table at the end of the 1975–76 season. The club nearly returned to the top tier in 1978–79 when they finished as runners-up of the second division, six points behind Bosnian side Čelik Zenica, but failed to win the promotion play-offs.

At the end of the 1980–81 season, after Maribor managed to avoid relegation from the second Yugoslav division, a bribery scandal emerged and caused the club to be relegated by the decision of the Football Association of Yugoslavia disciplinary committee. The club allegedly had a secret fund that served to bribe officials and opponents. The fund was abolished in 1968 after the club's promotion to the first division, but was later established again in 1976. After the scandal and the subsequent relegation, Maribor spent the following years bouncing between the second and third Yugoslav divisions until Slovenia's independence in 1991.

=== Domestic domination after independence (1991–2004) ===

The lineup that defeated Dynamo Kyiv 1–0 in the UEFA Champions League.

Following Slovenia's independence in June 1991, Maribor were one of the founding members of the newly formed Slovenian First League for the inaugural 1991–92 season. In the first few seasons, Maribor's rivals Olimpija from Ljubljana dominated the league. Nevertheless, Maribor managed to win the first edition of the Slovenian Cup in 1992 after beating Olimpija 4–3 on penalties in the final. In the next season, Maribor made their debut in international UEFA competitions, appearing in UEFA Cup Winners' Cup. They played their first international match on 19 August 1992, when they hosted Ħamrun Spartans of Malta and won 4–0. Ante Šimundža scored the first European goal for the club. Maribor were Slovenian League runners-up in 1991–92, 1992–93 and 1994–95, before finishing fourth in the 1995–96 season. During this period Maribor won another cup title in 1993–94, defeating Mura 3–2 on aggregate over two legs in the final.

The 1996–97 season proved to be a turning point in the club's history, as Maribor won the league and became champions for the first time. During the season, their average home attendance was 5,289, which is still a record today. The final match of the season was played on 1 June 1997 against Beltinci in front of 14,000 spectators, which is also a joint-record of the Slovenian top division. In that season Maribor also won the 1996–97 Slovenian Cup, thus winning the domestic double, a feat they repeated in the 1998–99 season. After their first title in 1996–97, Maribor went on to win six more titles, bringing their total number to seven consecutive titles by 2003. In the 1999–2000 season, the club, led by head coach Bojan Prašnikar, defeated Genk and Lyon in the qualifying rounds of the 1999–2000 UEFA Champions League and thus qualified for the group stage of the competition for the first time. Maribor were drawn into the group with Dynamo Kyiv, Bayer Leverkusen, and Lazio. They finished in last place with four points out of six games.

=== Financial difficulties (2004–2008) ===
The 2003–04 Slovenian Cup was the last trophy won by Maribor before the club declined for several years. Between 2004 and 2007, the club was plagued by major financial difficulties, and even came close to being disbanded at one point. Due to their large debts, which at one point amounted to over €3 million, the club could not afford to buy new players. As a result, the first team at the time consisted mostly of youth players mixed with a couple of foreign players brought to the club on free transfers. In the autumn of 2006, the leadership of the club changed, and it was not until January 2011 that the club announced that the debt had been paid in full. During this period, Maribor never finished higher than third in the league, and were runners-up of the Slovenian Cup twice, in 2007 and 2008. They were, however, one of the eleven winners of the 2006 UEFA Intertoto Cup, in which they defeated Spanish side Villarreal 3–2 on aggregate in the final round, only a couple of months after Villarreal had played in the semi-final of the UEFA Champions League.

=== Zlatko Zahovič's golden era (2008–2020) ===
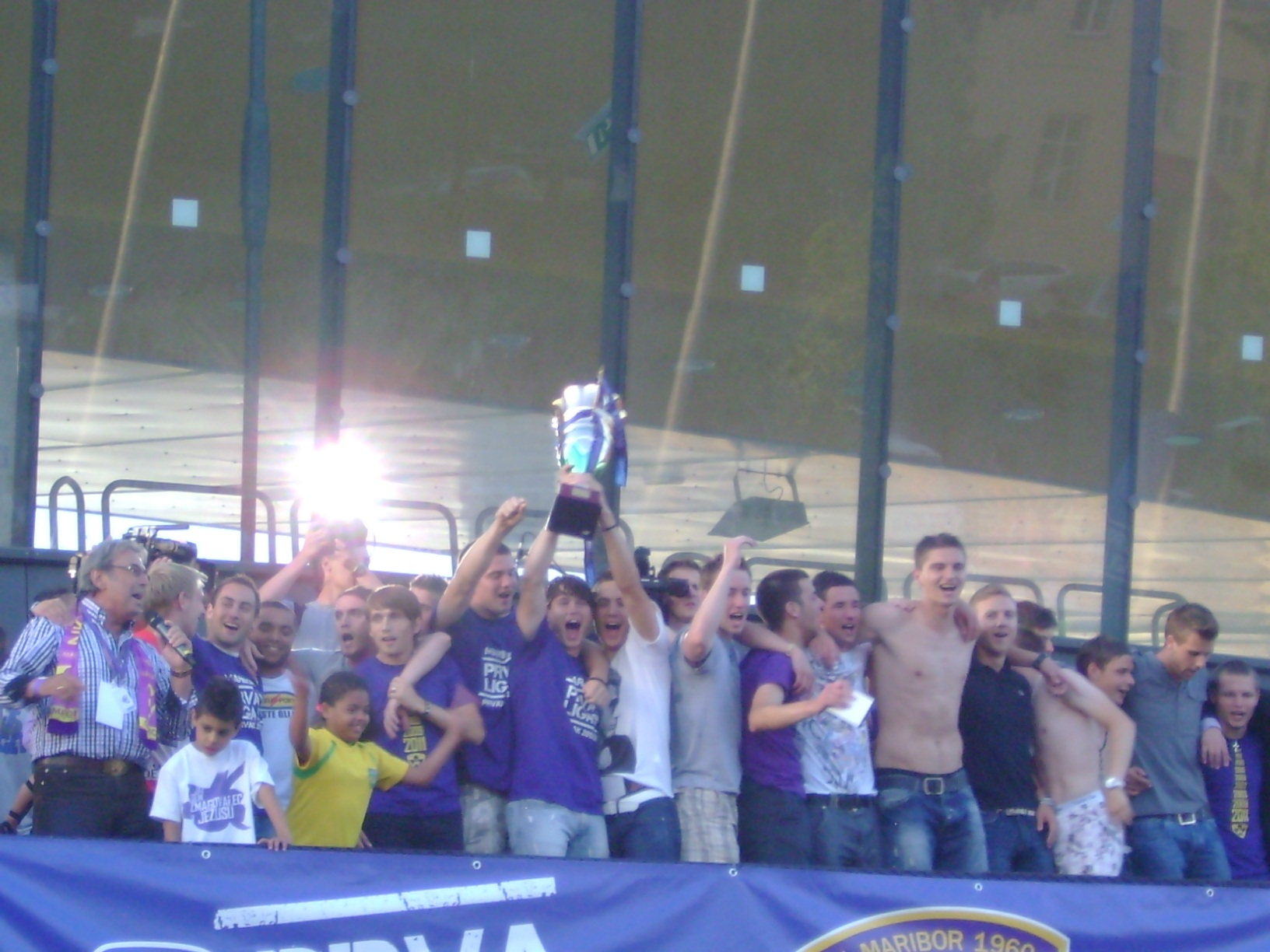
Maribor players celebrating the club's ninth league title in 2011.

In July 2007, Maribor appointed former Slovenian international Zlatko Zahovič as the club's sporting director, which marked the beginning of the golden era of the club.

In May 2008, Maribor played their first match at the renovated stadium in front of over 12,000 spectators. In the same month, Darko Milanič, who later became the most successful manager in the club's history, was appointed as manager. Under his leadership, Maribor won the league in the 2008–09 season, their first title in six years. The following season, they failed to retain the league title, finishing second behind Koper. However, they won the cup title after beating Domžale 3–2 in the final, as well as their first ever Slovenian Supercup title after beating Interblock.

At the end of 2010, the club celebrated its 50th anniversary, and also secured its ninth Slovenian league title during the course of the season. In the following years, Maribor won four more consecutive titles, bringing the total championship tally to 13, before finally losing the title in 2016 to their biggest rivals Olimpija Ljubljana. In 2012, Maribor also obtained a record number of points (85). Furthermore, Maribor also won two back-to-back doubles in this period, beating Celje on both occasions in the 2012 and 2013 Slovenian cup finals.

In 2011, Maribor made a breakthrough in international competitions. They eliminated Rangers in the UEFA Europa League play-offs and qualified for the group stage, their first group stage appearance in European competitions in more than a decade. They obtained one point in six matches, holding Braga to a 1–1 draw at home. In the next season, they again qualified for the group stage, and managed to win four points after defeating Panathinaikos and drawing with Tottenham Hotspur, both at home.

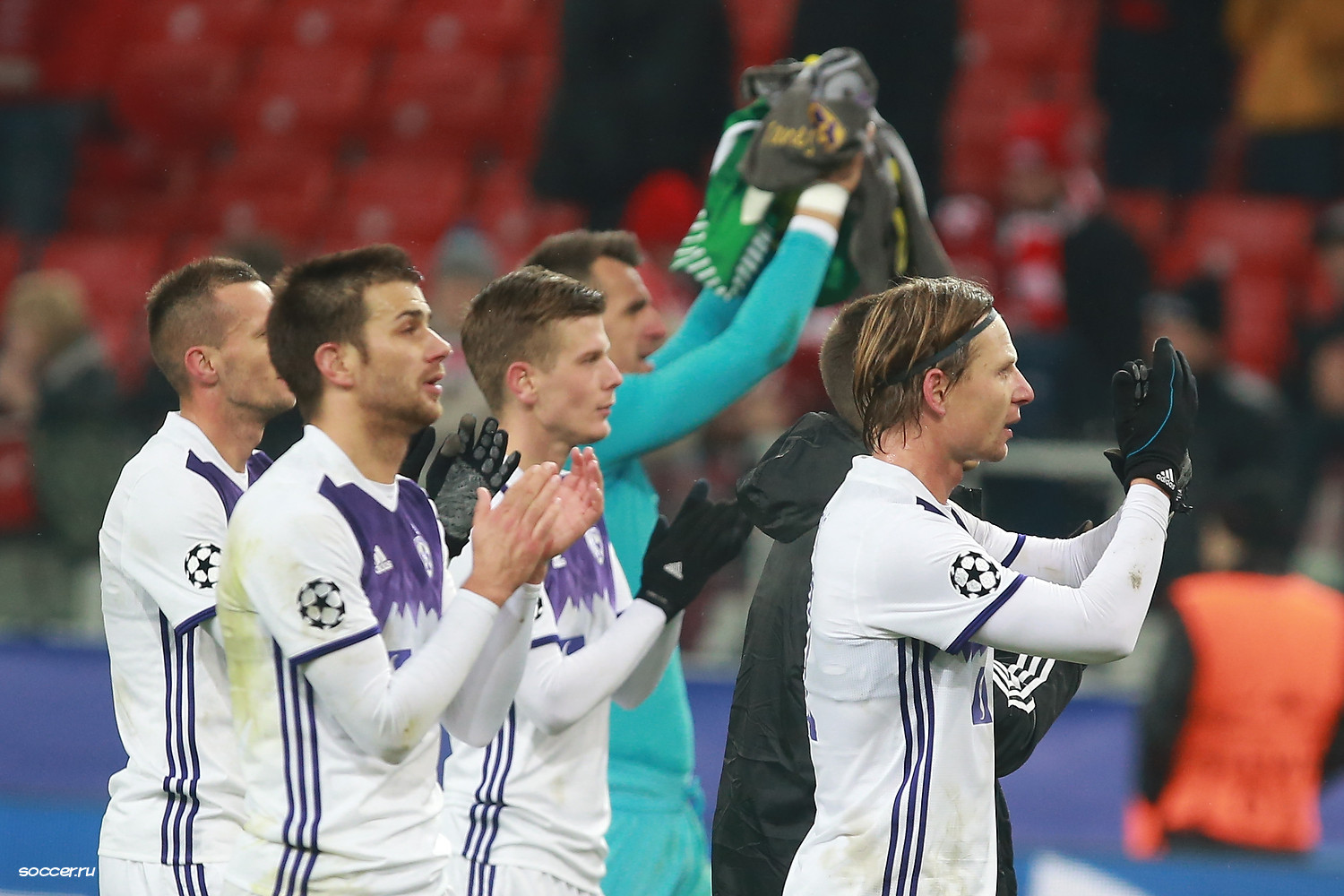
Maribor players after the 1–1 draw against Spartak Moscow in the 2017–18 UEFA Champions League.

In their third consecutive appearance in the group stage, in 2013–14, Maribor advanced to the knockout phase of the 2013–14 UEFA Europa League for the first time. In the round of 32, they were eliminated by the eventual winners of the competition, Sevilla, 4–3 on aggregate. Their successful European run was upgraded in the 2014–15 season, when Maribor finally qualified for the UEFA Champions League group stage for the second time in their history, after eliminating Celtic in the play-offs. They were drawn into Group G with Chelsea, Schalke 04, and Sporting CP. After a draw and a defeat against each team, Maribor won three points in six matches.

In 2015–16, Maribor failed to win the league title for the first time in six years, but reclaimed the throne the following season, winning their 14th national title. As Slovenian champions, Maribor represented Slovenia in the 2017–18 UEFA Champions League, and for the third time in the club's history reached the group stage. Maribor competed in Group E, along with Spartak Moscow, Sevilla, and Liverpool. The club again obtained three points in six matches, the same as in 2014, after drawing with Sevilla at home and twice against Spartak. Their 7–0 defeat to Liverpool was the club's heaviest home defeat in European competitions, and their second highest European defeat overall. In the same season, Maribor failed to win a trophy for the first time since 2007–08, losing the league title to Olimpija on head-to-head record after finishing with the same number of points. Olimpija also eliminated Maribor in the quarter-finals of the national cup, and therefore Maribor failed to reach the semi-finals of the competition for the first time since 2002–03.

In 2018–19, Maribor won its 15th national title under the guidance of Milanič, who won his sixth league title with the club and became the most successful manager in the Slovenian top division. However, Milanič and Zahovič left the club in March 2020 after a series of poor results. During Zahovič's era, Maribor won eight league titles and reached the UEFA Champions League group stages twice.

== Club identity ==
=== Colours, kits and nicknames ===
Throughout the entire history of NK Maribor, the main colour of the club has been purple. For this reason, the team is nicknamed "The Purples" (Vijoličasti) and "The Violets" (Vijolice). The club is also referred to as the "Viole", predominantly in the region of the former Yugoslavia.

When NK Maribor was established, some of the club officials were in favour of red and white colours, inspired by the coat of arms of the city of Maribor. However, because many football teams in Yugoslavia already wore red and white jerseys, Maribor officials decided for a new and fresh combination. They decided to follow the example of Fiorentina and their purple and white combination. Oto Blaznik, the first captain of the club, was the one who suggested the combination after seeing the Italian team in La Gazzetta dello Sport. Since it was almost impossible to get purple kits in Yugoslavia in 1961, the players painted them themselves. The club's secondary colours are yellow and white.

In March 1973, the name of the sponsor first appeared on Maribor kits. Since Slovenia's independence in 1991, the main kit sponsors have been Pivovarna Laško, OTP banka (known as Nova KBM before 2024) and Zavarovalnica Sava (Zavarovalnica Maribor before 2016).

Maribor's first kit in the 1960s had white shorts.

1997 home kit variation with yellow sleeves, when Maribor won its first league title.
In the first part of the 2000s, Maribor occasionally played its home matches in yellow kits.
Current all-purple home kit, predominantly in use with only minor modifications.

==== Kit manufacturers ====
Period	Kit manufacturer
–1995	Erreà
1996–2006	Nike
2007–2011	Zeus Sport
2011–present	Adidas

=== Crest ===
The current crest of the club is based on the official coat of arms of the city of Maribor, which is in turn based on a 14th-century seal with minor differences. The badge is formed in a shape of a shield, and shows the former Piramida Castle that used to stand on top of the Pyramid Hill before it was demolished at the end of the 18th century. A violet blossom forms the backdrop. Unlike the coat of arms of the city of Maribor, the club's current badge does not represent a white dove facing down towards the castle, but a minimalist portrayal of a person. At the top of the shield the name of the club and the year of its foundation is inscribed. The entire badge uses only two colours, purple and yellow. Previous versions of the crest included white, one of the club's traditional colours, in the form of a white castle in the centre and a white ball that was on top of the shield. Since May 2012, the crest includes a yellow star at the top, indicating the first ten domestic titles won.

1960s–1970s

1970s–1980s

Late 1980s

Early 1990s

1990s–2000s

=== Anthem ===
Since 1992, the club's official anthem has been the song "Heja, hej Viole", which was written and composed by the band Čudežna polja. 80 members of the Viole Maribor fan group also participated in the recording as backing vocalists. The premiere performance of the song took place on 16 September 1992, at the European Cup Winners' Cup match between Maribor and Atlético Madrid.

== Stadium ==
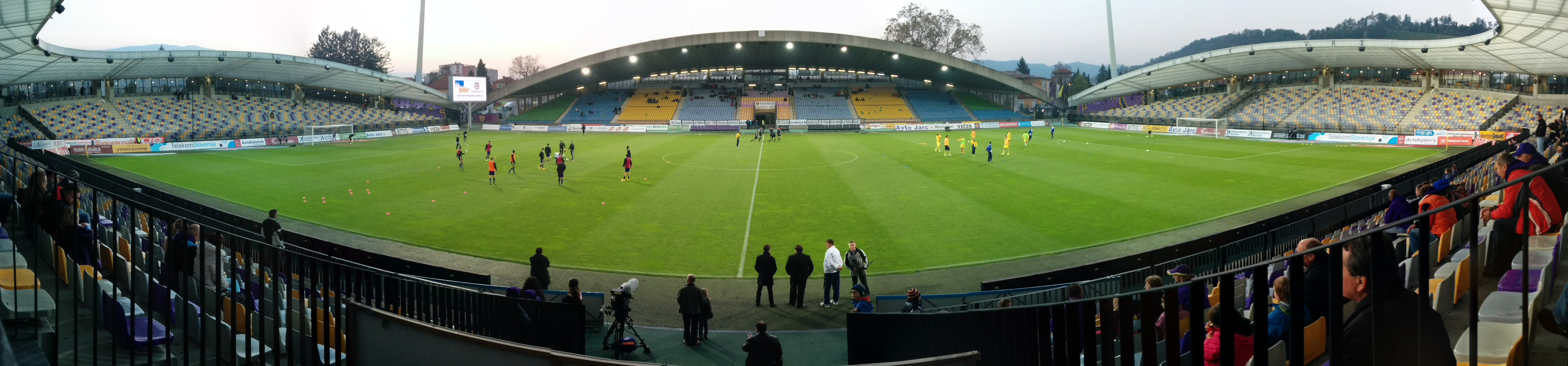
A panorama of Ljudski vrt before the renovation of the West Stand.

Maribor have played their home games at Ljudski vrt since June 1961. Previously, the club played a very short period of its early history at Stadion ob Tržaški cesti. Prior World War II, the ground consisted of just a pitch with a small stand, which was destroyed during the war. The site has been used for football since at least the early 20th century; between 1910 and 1960, it was the home ground of many teams based in Maribor, including Marburger Sportvereinigung, SV Rapid Marburg, SK Hertha, SK Rote Elf, I. SSK Maribor and NK Branik Maribor.

After the war, the ground was renovated and opened in 1952, but the main grandstand was not built until the early 1960s. On 25 June 1961, Maribor played its first match at the stadium, against Mladost Zabok, when the grandstand was still under construction.

Ljudski vrt is the only stadium in Maribor that is located on the left bank of the river Drava. It is considered a natural, cultural, architectural and sports landmark of the city and is named after a public park previously located in the area. A prominent feature of the grandstand is the 129.8 metres long and 18.4 m high concrete arch. In 1994, floodlights were installed and the stadium hosted its first match at night. Since then, the stadium went through several renovations. The most notable was the one between 2006 and 2008, when three of the four stands (South, East and North) were demolished and completely rebuilt. The West Stand was completely renovated in 2021, bringing the stadium's current capacity to 11,709 seats.

In addition to being the home ground of Maribor, the stadium also occasionally hosts matches of the Slovenia national football team. The record attendance of the stadium is 20,000 spectators, achieved in 1973 when Maribor played against Proleter Zrenjanin in the Yugoslav Second League promotion play-offs, while the record for a Slovenian League match is 14,000 spectators, achieved in the last round of the 1996–97 Slovenian PrvaLiga season.

== Supporters and rivalries ==
=== Supporters ===
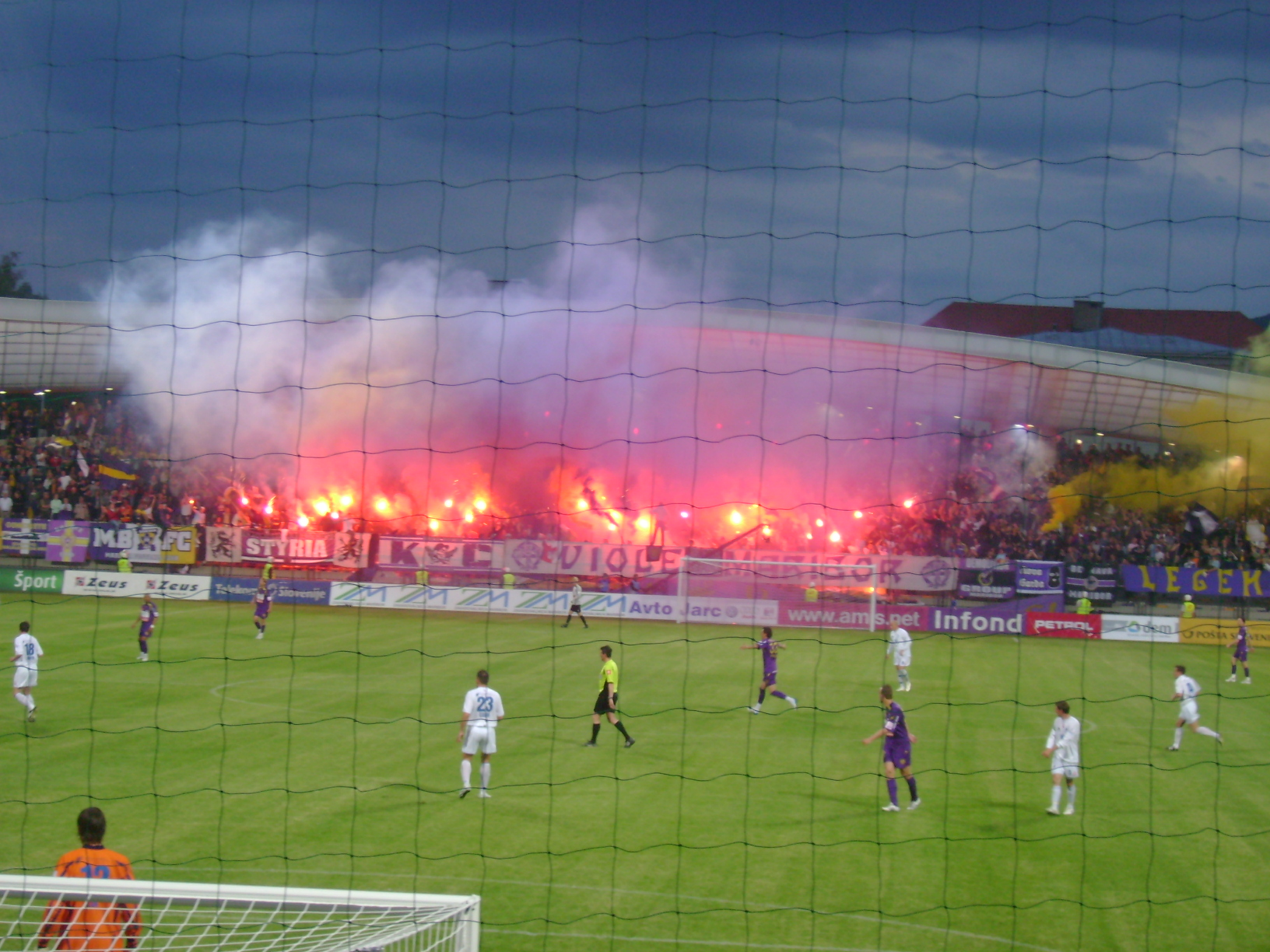
Viole Maribor in the South Stand of Ljudski vrt

NK Maribor is known for having a loyal and passionate supporters. In addition to the city of Maribor and its surroundings, the club also has a large fan base in Styria and Carinthia, with smaller groups of supporters also present in other parts of Slovenia. After its founding, Maribor was marked as a citizens' club, and their city rivals Železničar Maribor as a working class club.

Since the establishment of the Slovenian First League in 1991, Maribor has had the highest average home attendance in 29 out of 35 seasons. The highest average league attendance was in the 1996–97 season, when on average 5,289 people attended Maribor's home matches, which is a record in Slovenian club football. In addition, Maribor is the first team to gather more than two million people at Slovenian First League matches.

The club has an ultras group called Viole Maribor, established in 1989. A self-proclaimed apolitical group, they are located on the South Stand of the stadium. The record for the most travelling fans in domestic competitions was in 2001, when 3,000 Maribor supporters gathered in Ljubljana, while the most fans gathered abroad was in 2017 during the club's UEFA Champions League campaign, when over 2,400 supporters travelled to Liverpool.

Viole Maribor are known for hooliganism and clashes with the police and fans of other groups. One of the most serious incidents occurred in 2010, when a member of Viole stabbed a member of the Green Dragons, fans of Maribor's biggest rivals Olimpija, near the Ljubljana railway station. Another notable incident occurred in 2014, when four members of Viole were convicted of attacking a bus carrying Sevilla FC fans at a motorway rest area after a Europa League match, causing several injuries and property damage.

In 2015, Maribor was fined €15,000 by the Football Association of Slovenia after fans displayed a Celtic cross flag and banners with xenophobic messages during a match against Olimpija. In 2024, at a league match against Mura, a stun grenade thrown by a member of Viole injured six Mura players and a teenage ball boy, leading to a €25,000 fine, the match being registered 3–0 to Mura, and a four-match stadium closure for Maribor.

Maribor's average league attendance over a five-year interval
Season	Avg. attendance	Five-year change
1991–92	1,512	—N/a
1996–97	5,289	+249.85% ▲
2001–02	2,947	–44.29% ▼
2006–07	1,944	–34.05% ▼
2011–12	3,800	+95.45% ▲
2016–17	4,222	+11.11% ▲
2021–22	3,053	–27.68% ▼

=== Rivalries ===
Maribor's biggest rivalry is with Olimpija from the capital Ljubljana, against whom they contest the Eternal derby (Večni derbi). The rivalry dates back to the early 1960s, when both clubs used to play in the Yugoslav Second League. The first official match between the two clubs was played on 2 September 1962 at the Bežigrad Stadium in Ljubljana, and was watched by around 10,000 spectators.

In 2005, the old Olimpija was dissolved due to financial difficulties. In the same year, a phoenix club was established under the name NK Bežigrad, and was later renamed as NK Olimpija Ljubljana. The first derby between Maribor and the newly formed club was played on 24 October 2007 in the quarter-finals of the Slovenian Cup. When Olimpija was promoted to the Slovenian First League in 2009, the rivalry came back to life.

Maribor also developed a rivalry with another Styrian club, Celje, dubbed the Styrian derby (Štajerski derbi). Maribor and Celje contested in three Slovenian Cup finals, all of which were won by Maribor, and also competed for the national title in the 2002–03 season, when Maribor defeated Celje 2–1 in the decisive match with two late-game goals, clinching their seventh consecutive title.

Another rival of Maribor is Mura from Prekmurje, with whom they contest the Prekmurje–Styria derby (Štajersko-prekmurski derbi). In the 2020–21 season, Maribor and Mura contested the title-deciding match on the final day of the season. A draw was enough for Maribor, but Mura won 3–1 and clinched their first-ever title.

== Players ==
=== Current squad ===
As of 8 September 2026

Note: Flags indicate national team as defined under FIFA eligibility rules; some limited exceptions apply. Players may hold more than one non-FIFA nationality.

No.	Pos.	Nation	Player
1	GK	SLO	Ažbe Jug (captain)
3	DF	AUT	Čedomir Bumbić
4	MF	SLO	Nejc Viher
5	MF	SLO	Žan Jevšenak
6	DF	FRA	Bradley M'bondo
7	MF	SLO	Tio Cipot
8	MF	POR	Claude Gonçalves
10	MF	SLO	Žiga Repas
11	MF	IRL	Ali Reghba
14	MF	CIV	Jean Michaël Seri
15	MF	GHA	Eric Taylor
16	DF	SLO	Luka Kokol
17	FW	SLO	Jan Mlakar (on loan from Pisa)
21	DF	SLO	Vid Koderman

No.	Pos.	Nation	Player
23	DF	SLO	Žan Karničnik
25	DF	SLO	Miha Blažič
29	FW	CRO	Dario Vizinger
30	DF	SLO	Petar Stojanović (on loan from Legia Warsaw)
34	DF	SLO	Timon Kikec
38	MF	SLO	Niko Osterc
39	GK	SRB	Ivan Lainović
43	GK	SLO	Tanej Handanović
50	DF	SLO	Lan Vidmar
55	DF	SLO	Mark Španring
70	MF	FRA	Isaac Tshipamba
79	FW	SLO	Luka Zahović
98	GK	MAD	Téva Gardies
99	MF	MKD	Behar Feta

=== Out on loan ===
Note: Flags indicate national team as defined under FIFA eligibility rules; some limited exceptions apply. Players may hold more than one non-FIFA nationality.

No.	Pos.	Nation	Player
—	DF	SLO	Žan Meško (at Brinje Grosuplje until June 2027)
—	MF	SLO	Tine Čuk (at Ilirija 1911 until December 2026)
—	MF	SLO	Niko Grlić (at Ilirija 1911 until December 2026)

No.	Pos.	Nation	Player
—	MF	HUN	György Komáromi (at MTK Budapest until June 2027)
—	FW	SLO	Luka Mlakar (at Tabor Sežana until June 2027)

=== Retired numbers ===
Since 2005, Maribor have not issued the squad number 19. It was retired in honour of Stipe Balajić, who played for the club for eight seasons between 1997–98 and 2004–05. He played his last game for the club on 7 July 2005, a friendly match against his former club Hajduk Split, where he was substituted after 19 minutes of play in a symbolic gesture. In May 2021, the club retired another squad number, 33, in honour of goalkeeper Jasmin Handanović, who made over 350 appearances for Maribor between 2011 and 2021. In May 2022, the number 9 was retired in honour of Marcos Tavares, a longtime captain and the club's all-time most capped player and top goalscorer.

Maribor have also temporarily retired three squad numbers: 22, in honour of Martin Milec, 26, in honour of Aleksander Rajčević, and 28, in honour of Mitja Viler. The latter two were retired in 2020 and will remain unassigned until 2030, while Milec's number was retired in 2025 and will remain unassigned until 2035.

No.	Pos.	Nation	Player
9	FW	BRA	Marcos Tavares (2008–2022)
19	MF	CRO	Stipe Balajić (1998–2005)

No.	Pos.	Nation	Player
33	GK	SLO	Jasmin Handanović (2011–2021)

=== Youth Academy ===
The academy is responsible for the development of young players in the club. It is composed of ten youth selections, ranging from under-8 to under-19, with over 210 youth players in the system. The club has also spread the activities of the football school to primary schools in the city of Maribor, where around 850 of the youngest footballers train as part of the Children's Football School (Otroška nogometna šola).

Since the establishment of Maribor's youth system in its present form in 1990, the academy has been one of the most successful in the country in terms of titles won. The under-19 team holds the national record for most titles, having won the under-19 league eight times. The same team has also won five Youth Cups. Other teams are equally successful as both the under-17 and under-15 teams holds the record for the most titles in their category. In addition, Maribor's youth teams were the first in the country to win championship titles in the four highest youth categories (under-13, under-15, under-17 and under-19) in the same season. In 2012, a record eight Maribor players were called to the Slovenian under-17 national team for the 2012 UEFA European Under-17 Football Championship.

In 2016, the youth team of Maribor participated in the fourth edition of the international children's social programme Football for Friendship, the final events of which took place in Milan. The team won the tournament by defeating Debreceni VSC 1–0 in the final.

=== Purple Warrior ===
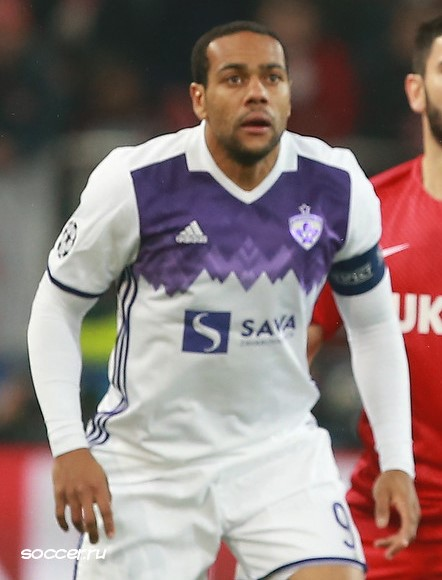
Marcos Tavares has won the Purple Warrior award six times.

The Purple Warrior (Vijol'čni bojevnik) is a trophy awarded to the most distinguished player of the year with the best attitude towards the fans and the club. The winner of the trophy is decided by a vote on the club's official website and also on the club's official Facebook page. To be eligible to participate in a poll, a player must appear for the club in at least 10 league matches.

Year	Winner
2008	(Czech Republic) Lubomir Kubica
2009	(Croatia) Dejan Mezga
2010	(Slovenia) Elvedin Džinić
2011	(Brazil) Marcos Tavares
2012	(Brazil) Marcos Tavares
2013	(Brazil) Marcos Tavares
2014	(Brazil) Marcos Tavares
2015	(Brazil) Marcos Tavares
2016	(Slovenia) Jasmin Handanović

Year	Winner
2017	(Brazil) Marcos Tavares
2018	(Serbia) Saša Ivković
2019	(Slovenia) Rok Kronaveter
2020	(Slovenia) Aljoša Matko
2021	(Serbia) Ognjen Mudrinski
2022	(Slovenia) Martin Milec
2023	(Slovenia) Ažbe Jug
2024	(Algeria) Hillal Soudani
2025	(Algeria) Hillal Soudani

== Management ==
=== Organisation ===
Updated 2 August 2026

Position	Name
President	Uroš Mlakar
Vice presidents	Matjaž Kirbiš; Andrej Plos
Board of directors	Uroš Lorenčič; Rok Moljk; Jure Struc; Miha Pitamic; Jože Kreševič
Director of football	Zlatko Zahovič
General secretary	Uroš Jurišič
Assistant secretary	Tadej Zajmi
Academy director	Sebastijan Harc
Academy sporting director	Boštjan Kreft

=== Technical staff ===
Updated 15 July 2026

Position	Name
Head coach	Darko Milanič
Assistant coaches	Radovan Karanović; Dragan Jelić; Dominik Mohorović
Goalkeeping coaches	Mitja Pirih; Jasmin Handanović
Fitness coaches	Tomaž Zorec; Milan Vulović
Video analyst	Matej Šantek
Doctors	Matjaž Vogrin; Zmago Krajnc; Igor Mijatović
Physiotherapists	Mirzet Sprečo; Jure Horvat; Sani Nasif
Equipment managers	Janko Veselič; Robert Knuplež; Tatjana Fiedler

=== Notable managers ===
The following managers have won at least one trophy when in charge of Maribor since Slovenia's independence in 1991:

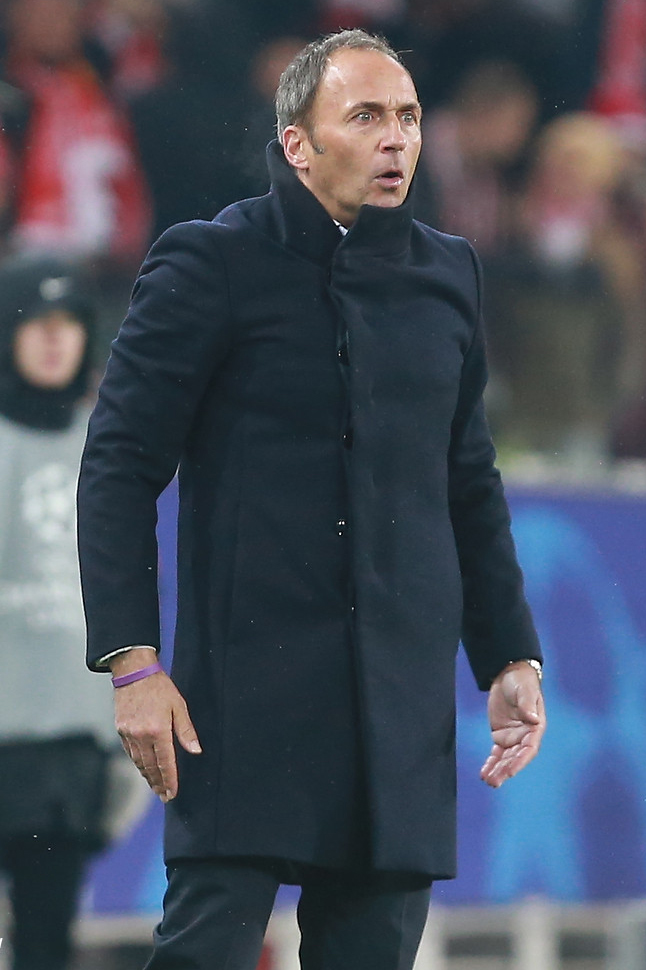
Darko Milanič is Maribor's most successful manager

Name	Years	Honours
Marijan Bloudek	1989–1993; 1994–1995	1991–92 Slovenian Cup
Branko Horjak	1993–1994; 1995; 2004–2005; 2007–2008	1993–94 Slovenian Cup
Bojan Prašnikar	1996–2000; 2001–2002	1996–97 Slovenian Championship; 1996–97 Slovenian Cup; 1997–98 Slovenian Championship; 1998–99 Slovenian Championship; 1998–99 Slovenian Cup; 2001–02 Slovenian Championship
Matjaž Kek	2000; 2001; 2002–2004	1999–2000 Slovenian Championship; 2002–03 Slovenian Championship; 2003–04 Slovenian Cup
Ivo Šušak	2000–2001	2000–01 Slovenian Championship
Darko Milanič	2008–2013; 2016–2020; 2026–present	2008–09 Slovenian Championship; 2009 Slovenian Supercup; 2009–10 Slovenian Cup; 2010–11 Slovenian Championship; 2011–12 Slovenian Championship; 2011–12 Slovenian Cup; 2012 Slovenian Supercup; 2012–13 Slovenian Championship; 2012–13 Slovenian Cup; 2015–16 Slovenian Cup; 2016–17 Slovenian Championship; 2018–19 Slovenian Championship
Ante Čačić	2013	2013 Slovenian Supercup
Ante Šimundža	2013–2015; 2023–2024	2013–14 Slovenian Championship; 2014 Slovenian Supercup; 2014–15 Slovenian Championship
Radovan Karanović	2021–2022	2021–22 Slovenian Championship

== Honours ==
With 16 Slovenian First League titles and 9 Slovenian Cup titles, Maribor is the most successful club in Slovenia in terms of trophies won, and is the record holder for the most consecutive championship titles, with seven. They have also achieved the Slovenian Championship and the Slovenian Cup double on four occasions. In addition, they are the only club which has won the Slovenian version of the treble, having won the league, cup and supercup during the 2012–13 season. On their official website, UEFA states that Maribor have won one international cup, as the club were one of the eleven co-winners of the UEFA Intertoto Cup in 2006. However, the trophy itself was awarded to Newcastle United. Maribor have the best top-flight record in history, having finished below fourth place only twice. In 2008, they became the first team to win over 1,000 points in the Slovenian top flight.

The club's most recent trophy came in May 2022, when they won their 16th Slovenian First League title.

=== Domestic ===
League

- Slovenian First League
  - Winners (16): 1996–97, 1997–98, 1998–99, 1999–2000, 2000–01, 2001–02, 2002–03, 2008–09, 2010–11, 2011–12, 2012–13, 2013–14, 2014–15, 2016–17, 2018–19, 2021–22
  - Runners-up (10): 1991–92, 1992–93, 1994–95, 2009–10, 2015–16, 2017–18, 2019–20, 2020–21, 2023–24, 2024–25
- Yugoslav Second League (second tier in Yugoslavia)
  - Winners (1): 1966–67
  - Runners-up (3): 1963–64, 1972–73, 1978–79
- Slovenian Republic League (third tier in Yugoslavia)
  - Winners (5): 1960–61, 1975–76, 1981–82, 1983–84, 1985–86
  - Runners-up (1): 1987–88

Cup

- Slovenian Cup (since 1991)
  - Winners (9): 1991–92, 1993–94, 1996–97, 1998–99, 2003–04, 2009–10, 2011–12, 2012–13, 2015–16
  - Runners-up (6): 2006–07, 2007–08, 2010–11, 2013–14, 2018–19, 2022–23
- Slovenian Republic Cup (prior 1991)
  - Winners (13): 1961, 1966, 1967, 1972–73, 1973–74, 1976–77, 1978–79, 1980–81, 1982–83, 1984–85, 1985–86, 1987–88, 1988–89
  - Runners-up (8): 1963, 1968, 1969, 1970, 1971, 1972, 1983–84, 1986–87
- Slovenian Supercup
  - Winners (4): 2009, 2012, 2013, 2014
  - Runners-up (3): 2010, 2011, 2015
- MNZ Maribor Cup
  - Winners (1): 1991–92

=== International ===
- UEFA Intertoto Cup
  - Winners (1): 2006 (joint winners)

=== Doubles ===
- League and Cup: 4
  - 1996–97, 1998–99, 2011–12, 2012–13
