= Radio City (Maribor) =

Private radio station in Maribor, Slovenia

Coordinates: 46°33′36.86″N 15°38′34.52″E

- Type: Radio network
- Country: Slovenia
- Availability: North-east Slovenia, internet
- Key people: Bor Greiner, Natalija Veronik, Andrea Atić, Timea Kisuczky Dimkovski
- Launch date: 1995
- Official website: http://www.radiocity.si

Radio City is a private radio station located in the city of Maribor, Slovenia, which broadcasts on three radio frequencies. It can be heard predominantly in the northeastern part of the country on the frequency of 100.6 MHz (Maribor), 100.8 MHz (Celje) and also on 99.5 MHz in Ljubljana. It is also available on the internet through the official website and on DAB+ digital radio.

Broadcasts began in 1995 in Maribor from the HQ in Slovenska ulica 40. Nowadays, programming is broadcast from Razlagova ulica, which is another location in Maribor. The chief editor of Radio City is Bor Greiner.

Radio City is known for programming, such as:

- Vročih 20 (The Hottest 20 chartshow): weekly (every Saturday from 12 PM to 2 PM; rebroadcast on every Thursday from 9 PM to 11 PM) foreign (Top-40 format-styled) popular music chart programming; the listeners can vote, which songs qualify for the chart show
- Slovenskih vročih 20 (The Slovenian Hottest 20 chartshow): weekly (every Tuesday from 9 PM to 11 PM) Slovenian popular music chart programming with Natalija Veronik
- Party hit Mix: weekly (every Friday and Saturday from 8 PM to 12 AM) DJ mix, curated by DJ Enrico Ostendorf
- Osemdeseta ob osmih (80's at Eight o'clock): programme with songs from the 1980s, hosted by Mateja Car; broadcast from Sunday to Thursday from 8 PM to 9 PM
- Reporter Milan: satirical programming (which often draws inspirations from current events and local environment) with Matjaž Šalamun (performing as Šalca), Tine Križanič (performing as Tine) and Dejan Vedlin (performing as the reporter, named Milan).
- Live play-by-play football match (NK Maribor) transmissions
- Dan v mestu (The Day in the city): short daily local news programme; broadcast during the weekdays in the evening
- Kviz brez Googla (Quiz without using Google): quiz with random passers-by as the contestants, who try to answer four progressively harder questions (which are sometimes connected to a specific topic or event(s)) without using the Internet (they can ask the host or another passer-by for help); for each correct answer the contestant gets €10
- Aha efekt ("Say Uh-Huh" Effect): weekday-broadcast programme, which tries to give answers to unusual questions, sent by the listeners

According to various opinion polls, Radio City is the most listened to private radio station in the Slovenian Styria. One of the most recognizable elements of the radio station is the trio known under the slogan "Ni nam lahko" (it is not easy for us).

== See also ==
- List of radio stations in Slovenia
