= Green Dragons =

Sport supporters' group from Slovenija

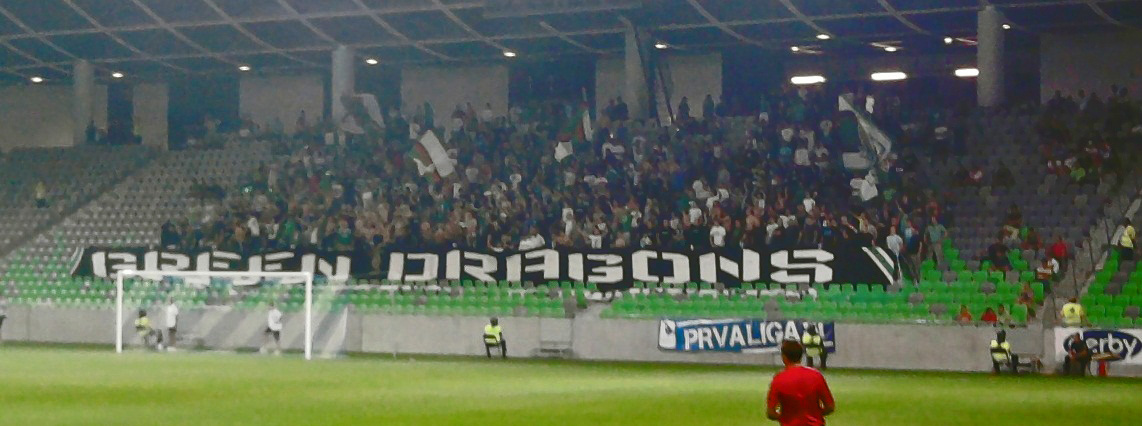
- Green Dragons in 2010
- Abbreviation: GD
- Established: 1988
- Type: Supporters' group Ultras group
- Team: Olimpija Ljubljana
- Location: Ljubljana, Slovenia
- Arena: Stožice Stadium
- Colors: Green, white, black
- Website: green-dragons.com

The Green Dragons, also known simply as "Dragonsi" (The Dragons), are supporters of Slovenian football club Olimpija Ljubljana. They are one of the two major football ultras groups in Slovenia, the other being their traditional rivals, Viole Maribor. They mostly wear green, white and black symbols and clothing, which are also the club's colours.

== The name ==
The name Green Dragons is connected to the symbol of the Slovenian capital, Ljubljana, which is a green dragon. The image of the dragon is therefore familiar to all the residents of the city and it even appears in bronze form on one of the more famous bridges across the Ljubljanica river, the Dragon Bridge. However, the name Green Dragons was first used during a football game against FC Prishtina in the autumn of 1988.
