= Talum =

Aluminum production company in Kidricevo, Slovenia

Coordinates: 46°23′40″N 15°47′23″E

- Type: Public company
- Industry: aluminium
- Founded: 1947
- Headquarters: Kidričevo, Slovenia
- Key people: Marko Drobnič, CEO
- Products: aluminium products, aluminium alloys
- Revenue: 446.701.687 € (2022)
- Number of employees: 1212 (2022)
- Website: http://www.talum.si/

Talum is a major Slovenian company based in Kidričevo and specialising in alumina and aluminium products with an annual production capacity of around 156,000 tonnes.

== History ==
The company was founded in 1942 by the German company Vereinigte Aluminium Werke, which built the first alumina factory in Slovenia in Strnišče (now Kidričevo). By the end of World War II, the factory was 70% completed, but the construction had to be halted.

The factory was finished in February 1954 and the first aluminium was produced in November the same year. The early capacity of the factory was 45,000 tonnes of alumina and 15,000 tonnes of aluminium per year.

The first contract was established in 1957 with the French company Pechiney to supply a quantity of 80,000 tonnes of alumina.

In 2004, a large-scale modernisation programme started at Talum, which involved the construction of other new potlines for aluminium smelting. The total aluminium production from November 1954 to August 2004 amounted to around 2,560,069 tonnes, resulting in an annual production of around 51,000 tonnes of aluminium.

Due to the long-term loss, several subsidiaries were closed in 2015: Talum Ulitki, Talum Livarna.

In 2016, the company became the "best employer in the Podravje region", with Talum employing more than 1,300 workers.

In 2017, the company received the title "Podravska podjetje of the year" by the newspaper Večer and the Styrian Chamber of Commerce. Primary aluminum production was stopped in 2023 after 60 years but aluminum and alumina products are still produced.
