= Ekipa (Slovenia) =

Slovenian daily sports newspaper

EkipaSN
- Type: Daily sports newspaper
- Publisher: Salomon 2000, d.o.o.
- Editor: Goran Obrez
- Founded: 2000
- Headquarters: Ljubljana, Slovenia
- Circulation: 30,000 (2013)
- Website: www.ekipa.org

EkipaSN is a daily sports newspaper published in Ljubljana, Slovenia.

== History and profile ==
Ekipa was first published in 2000. It is a sports paper and is published by Salomon Group.

The circulation of Ekipa was 25,000 copies in 2003. The 2007 circulation of the paper was 14,900 copies. Its circulation was 30,000 copies in 2013.
