= 2004–05 Slovenian Football Cup =

Tournament details
- Country: Slovenia
- Teams: 32

Final positions
- Champions: Celje (1st title)
- Runners-up: Gorica

Tournament statistics
- Matches played: 33
- Goals scored: 128 (3.88 per match)
- Top goal scorer: Jože Benko (7 goals)

The 2004–05 Slovenian Football Cup was the 14th season of the Slovenian Football Cup, Slovenia's football knockout competition. The tournament system was changed for this season. 20 lower league teams played in the first round, two last placed Slovenian PrvaLiga teams joined in the second and the rest in the Round of 16. The final was held as a single-legged match.

== Qualified clubs ==
=== 2003–04 Slovenian PrvaLiga members ===
- Celje
- Domžale
- Drava Ptuj
- Dravograd
- Gorica
- Koper
- Ljubljana
- Maribor
- Mura
- Olimpija
- Primorje
- Šmartno

=== Qualified through MNZ Regional Cups ===
- MNZ Ljubljana: Svoboda, Factor, Krka
- MNZ Maribor: Železničar Maribor, Duplek, Paloma
- MNZ Celje: Rudar Velenje, Krško
- MNZ Koper: Portorož Piran, Izola
- MNZ Nova Gorica: Tolmin, Brda
- MNZ Murska Sobota: Veržej, Tišina
- MNZ Lendava: Nafta Lendava, Hotiza
- MNZG-Kranj: Triglav Kranj, Jesenice
- MNZ Ptuj: Aluminij, Zavrč

== First round ==
The first round matches took place on 4 and 7 August 2004.

4 August 2004	Tolmin	0–3	Factor	Tolmin
17:00 CEST		Report	Jelečević 30'; Gregorn 57'; Kitić 60'	Stadium: Brajda; Attendance: 50; Referee: Aleš Partlič

4 August 2004	Svoboda	0–1	Triglav Kranj	Ljubljana
17:00 CEST		Report	Stanko 55' (pen.)	Stadium: Svoboda Sports Park; Attendance: 100; Referee: Boris Jeneš

4 August 2004	Brda	1–4 (a.e.t.)	Izola	Dobrovo
17:00 CEST	Đerić 85'	Report	Franetič 77'; Šabić 96'; Šabanović 117', 120'	Stadium: Vipolže Stadium; Attendance: 100; Referee: Sašo Habjanič

4 August 2004	Duplek	1–8	Rudar Velenje	Spodnji Duplek
17:00 CEST	Štorgelj 80' (pen.)	Report	Halilović 28'; Mujaković 36'; Rahmanović 40'; Ibrahimovič 47'; Grbić 49'; Rajković 57'; Borštnar 59', 67'	Stadium: Igrišče Duplek; Attendance: 40; Referee: Andrej Tratnjek

4 August 2004	Paloma	2–3	Zavrč	Sladki Vrh
17:00 CEST	Petrovič 51'; A. Ozim 89'	Report	Golob 35'; Krepek 60'; Kokot 75'	Stadium: NK Paloma Stadium; Attendance: 250; Referee: Vojko Goričan

4 August 2004	Hotiza	0–4	Aluminij	Hotiza
17:00 CEST		Report	Pekez 15', 62' (pen.); Fridauer 28'; Kelenc 45'	Stadium: Hotiza Sports Park; Attendance: 70; Referee: Tomislav Horvat

4 August 2004	Veržej	0–2	Nafta	Veržej
17:00 CEST		Report	Bunc 23'; Benko 75'	Stadium: Čistina; Attendance: 200; Referee: Boris Tošeski

4 August 2004	Krka	1–2	Krško	Novo Mesto
17:00 CEST	Perše 56' (pen.)	Report	Kapušin 25'; Omerzu 80'	Stadium: Portoval; Attendance: 200; Referee: Drago Klinc

7 August 2004	Portorož Piran	3–3 (a.e.t.) (4–3 p)	Jesenice	Piran
17:00 CEST	Peršič 4', 101' (pen.); Zelinčević 84' (pen.)	Report	Bošković 33'; Kostadinovič 43'; Rekić 105' (pen.)	Stadium: Pod Obzidjem Stadium; Attendance: 90; Referee: Davor Drečnik
	Penalties
	Udovič (penalty scored); Stolčić (penalty scored); Sotlar (penalty scored); Peršič (penalty scored)		(penalty scored) Bošković; (penalty scored) Tadić; (penalty scored) Alagić

7 August 2004	Tišina	3–3 (a.e.t.) (3–4 p)	Železničar Maribor	Tišina
17:00 CEST	Čontala 29'; Ulen 49', 73'	Report	Glamočič 12'; Kronaveter 22', 72'	Stadium: Tišina Stadium; Attendance: 100; Referee: Aleksander Likič
	Penalties
	Kous (penalty scored); Poredoš (penalty scored); Verban (penalty scored)		(penalty scored) Pavlin; (penalty scored) Letonja; (penalty scored) Mačukat; (penalty scored) Türk

== Second round ==
The second round matches took place on 15 September 2004.

15 September 2004	Aluminij	5–1	Krško	Kidričevo
16:00 CEST	M. Ozim 25'; Pekez 30'; Komljenović 32'; Hodžar 34'; Fridauer 90'	Report	Kelenc 74'	Stadium: Aluminij Sports Park; Attendance: 150; Referee: Roberto Ponis

15 September 2004	Zavrč	2–1	Rudar Velenje	Zavrč
16:00 CEST	Krepek 16'; Ljubanić 69'	Report	Ibrahimovič 43'	Stadium: Sports Park; Attendance: 225; Referee: Janez Babnik

15 September 2004	Železničar Maribor	2–6 (a.e.t.)	Dravograd	Maribor
16:00 CEST	Kronaveter 27'; Verdnik 50'	Report	Aleksič 25', 96'; Pečnik 89'; Rebol 93', 99'; Čavnik 118'	Stadium: Tabor Sports Park; Attendance: 100; Referee: Miran Bukovec

15 September 2004	Nafta	1–0	Drava Ptuj	Lendava
16:00 CEST	Ristić 68'	Report		Stadium: Lendava Sports Park; Attendance: 250; Referee: Emir Huselja

15 September 2004	Izola	1–0	Triglav Kranj	Izola
16:00 CEST	Božič 63'	Report		Stadium: City Stadium; Attendance: 100; Referee: Matej Jug

15 September 2004	Portorož Piran	0–3	Factor	Piran
16:00 CEST		Report	Banič 39'; Radulović 40'; Vencaš Požeg 81'	Stadium: Pod Obzidjem Stadium; Attendance: 90; Referee: Jože Vehar

== Round of 16 ==
The round of 16 matches took place between 29 September and 12 October 2004.

29 September 2004	Aluminij	1–2	Nafta	Kidričevo
15:30 CEST	Fridauer 35'	Report	Madžar 9'; Suljić 53'	Stadium: Aluminij Sports Park; Attendance: 150; Referee: Roberto Ponis

29 September 2004	Domžale	2–1 (a.e.t.)	Ljubljana	Domžale
15:30 CEST	Ljubijankić 16'; Dvorančič 115'	Report	Karapetrović 66'	Stadium: Sports Park; Attendance: 200; Referee: Robert Krajnc

29 September 2004	Dravograd	5–2 (a.e.t.)	Primorje	Dravograd
15:30 CEST	Gostenčnik 45' (pen.); Pečnik 85', 92'; Ostojić 99' (o.g.); Rebol 110'	Report	Mlakar 13'; Škerjanc 20'	Stadium: Dravograd Sports Centre; Attendance: 250; Referee: Matjaž Bohinc

29 September 2004	Olimpija	2–0	Factor	Ljubljana
15:30 CEST	Cimirotič 21'; Žlogar 25'	Report		Stadium: Bežigrad Stadium; Attendance: 300; Referee: Srečko Kandare

29 September 2004	Mura	4–0	Šmartno	Murska Sobota
15:30 CEST	Omladič 2'; Rakovič 14' (pen.); Bulajič 35'; Lukenda 82' (o.g.)	Report		Stadium: Fazanerija; Attendance: 300; Referee: Robert Šegula

29 September 2004	Celje	2–0	Izola	Celje
18:00 CEST	Čadikovski 49', 90'	Report		Stadium: Arena Petrol; Attendance: 500; Referee: Roman Glažar

10 October 2004	Koper	1–2	Maribor	Koper
15:00 CEST	Vitagliano 67'	Report	Komljenović 20', 79'	Stadium: Bonifika Stadium; Attendance: 300; Referee: Robert Šegula

12 October 2004	Gorica	6–0	Zavrč	Nova Gorica
17:00 CEST	Ranić 41', 69'; Burgić 54', 60'; Rodić 63'; Kršić 87'	Report		Stadium: Sports Park; Attendance: 250; Referee: Janez Babnik

== Quarter-finals ==
The quarter-finals took place on 27 October 2004.

27 October 2004	Domžale	2–4 (a.e.t.)	Gorica	Domžale
14:30 CEST	Dvorančič 35'; Stevanović 58'	Report	Puš 26'; Lungu 74'; Komac 108', 120'	Stadium: Sports Park; Attendance: 350; Referee: Drago Kos

27 October 2004	Nafta	9–2	Dravograd	Lendava
14:30 CEST	Bunc 9'; Benko 16', 35', 47', 56', 69', 85'; Ristić 38', 83'	Report	Vrhnjak 20'; Pevec 77'	Stadium: Lendava Sports Park; Attendance: 500; Referee: Matej Jug

27 October 2004	Celje	1–1 (a.e.t.) (4–2 p)	Olimpija	Celje
17:30 CEST	Drobne 100'	Report	Žlogar 106'	Stadium: Arena Petrol; Attendance: 1,100; Referee: Damir Skomina
	Penalties
	Gobec (penalty scored); Sešlar (penalty scored); Drobne (penalty scored); Budimir (penalty scored)		(penalty scored) Jusufbegović; (penalty scored) Dedić

27 October 2004	Maribor	2–0	Mura	Maribor
18:00 CEST	Rakič 41'; Mujanovič 89'	Report		Stadium: Ljudski vrt Attendance: 1,700; Referee: Darko Čeferin

== Semi-finals ==
The first legs of the semi-finals took place on 20 April, and the second legs took place on 27 and 28 April 2005.

=== First legs ===
20 April 2005	Maribor	2–1	Celje	Maribor
20:00 CEST	Brezič 34'; Teinović 88'	Report	Sešlar 3' (pen.)	Stadium: Ljudski vrt Attendance: 5,000; Referee: Damir Skomina

20 April 2005	Gorica	2–0	Nafta	Nova Gorica
20:00 CEST	Komac 51'; Kokot 84' (pen.)	Report		Stadium: Sports Park; Attendance: 400; Referee: Janez Babnik

=== Second legs ===
27 April 2005	Nafta	0–1 (0–3 agg.)	Gorica	Lendava
16:30 CEST		Report	Kokot 82' (pen.)	Stadium: Lendava Sports Park; Attendance: 2,000; Referee: Davor Drečnik

27 April 2005	Celje	3–1 (4–3 agg.)	Maribor	Celje
20:00 CEST	Križnik 68'; Gobec 88'; Robnik 89'	Report	Božičič 24'	Stadium: Arena Petrol; Attendance: 2,200; Referee: Darko Čeferin

== Final ==
17 May 2005
20:00 CEST

Celje	1–0	Gorica
Lungu 73' (o.g.)	Report

Arena Petrol, Celje
Attendance: 3,800
Referee: Drago Kos
