= 2001–02 Slovenian Football Cup =

Tournament details
- Country: Slovenia
- Teams: 32

Final positions
- Champions: Gorica (2nd title)
- Runners-up: Aluminij

Tournament statistics
- Matches played: 38
- Goals scored: 143 (3.76 per match)
- Top goal scorer(s): Damir Pekič; Aleš Čeh (both 7 goals)

The 2001–02 Slovenian Football Cup was the eleventh season of the Slovenian Football Cup, Slovenia's football knockout competition.

== Qualified clubs ==
=== 2000–01 Slovenian PrvaLiga members ===
- Celje
- Domžale
- Dravograd
- Gorica
- Koper
- Korotan Prevalje
- Maribor
- Mura
- Olimpija
- Primorje
- Tabor Sežana
- Rudar Velenje

=== Qualified through MNZ Regional Cups ===
- MNZ Ljubljana: Ljubljana, Elan, Kolpa
- MNZ Maribor: Železničar Maribor, Rogoza, Paloma
- MNZ Celje: Šmartno, Šmarje pri Jelšah
- MNZ Koper: Ankaran, Jadran Dekani
- MNZ Nova Gorica: Brda, Tolmin
- MNZ Murska Sobota: Beltinci, Bakovci
- MNZ Lendava: Odranci, Nafta Lendava
- MNZG-Kranj: Triglav Kranj, Šenčur
- MNZ Ptuj: Ormož, Aluminij

== First round ==
The first round matches took place between 14 July and 5 August 2001.

14 July 2001	Koper	3–0	Triglav Kranj	Koper
17:30 CEST	Huseinović 41', 66'; Benedejčič 53'	Report		Stadium: Bonifika Stadium; Attendance: 1,000; Referee: Gregor Ihan

14 July 2001	Brda	0–9	Maribor	Dobrovo
18:00 CEST		Report	Sešlar 26', 41', 74'; Duro 30'; Sztipanovics 33', 34'; Pekič 64', 80'; Žnuderl 67'	Stadium: Vipolže Stadium; Attendance: 400; Referee: Emir Huselja

15 July 2001	Paloma	0–4	Rudar Velenje	Sladki Vrh
17:30 CEST		Report	Bošković 41'; Plesec 47' (pen.); Mujanovič 56'; Spasojevič 27'	Stadium: NK Paloma Stadium; Attendance: 30; Referee: Andrej Tratnjek

15 July 2001	Šmartno	1–1 (a.e.t.) (6–5 p)	Primorje	Šmartno ob Paki
17:30 CEST	Smajlović 44'	Report	Črnigoj 74'	Stadium: Šmartno Stadium; Attendance: 700; Referee: Srečko Kandare
	Penalties
	Štancar (penalty scored); Borštnar (penalty scored); Mujaković (penalty scored); Mernik (penalty scored); Jakopič (penalty scored); Omladič (penalty scored)		(penalty scored) Vidmar; (penalty scored) Mlakar; (penalty scored) Ranić; (penalty scored) Mulahmetović; (penalty scored) Gregorič

15 July 2001	Elan	0–8	Mura	Novo Mesto
17:30 CEST		Report	Čauševič 31', 75'; Baranja 40', 76'; Gostan 47', 58', 66'; Gabor 83'	Stadium: Portoval; Attendance: 150; Referee: Damir Skomina

15 July 2001	Korotan Prevalje	1–1 (a.e.t.) (3–4 p)	Domžale	Prevalje
17:30 CEST	Jakirović 51'	Report	Klarica 77'	Stadium: Stadion na Prevaljah; Attendance: 400; Referee: Darko Čeferin
	Penalties
	Miškič (penalty scored); Vidojević (penalty scored); Jakirović (penalty scored)		(penalty scored) Protega; (penalty scored) Aranđelović; (penalty scored) Maretić; (penalty scored) Kneževič

15 July 2001	Beltinci	1–5	Gorica	Beltinci
17:30 CEST	Virag 28'	Report	Kovačevič 21'; Kostić 27'; Šakiri 35', 72', 74'	Stadium: Beltinci Sports Park; Attendance: 200; Referee: Bojan Brence

18 July 2001	Olimpija	2–4	Celje	Ljubljana
20:00 CEST	Jolič 18'; Kosič 85' (pen.)	Report	Beršnjak 21'; Kousal 55', 68'; Gobec 79'	Stadium: Bežigrad Stadium; Attendance: 550; Referee: Robert Šegula

5 August 2001	Rogoza	(w/o)^{1}	Ankaran

5 August 2001	Bakovci	1–2	Šmarje pri Jelšah	Bakovci
17:00 CEST	Fajdiga 85' (pen.)	Report	Lončarič 15'; Plošnik 45' (pen.)	Stadium: ŠRC Bakovci; Attendance: 200; Referee: Radenko Kmetec

5 August 2001	Odranci	4–3	Kolpa	Odranci
17:00 CEST	Zadravec 24', 62'; Virag 44', 81'	Report	Halužan 1'; Pezdirc 75'; Princ 89'	Stadium: ŠRC Odranci; Attendance: 300; Referee: Marjan Rajh

5 August 2001	Nafta	1–2 (a.e.t.)	Šenčur	Lendava
17:00 CEST	Zver 58'	Report	Košir 90'; Šantak 97'	Stadium: Lendava Sports Park; Attendance: 150; Referee: Boris Mihelič

5 August 2001	Ljubljana	2–1	Tolmin	Ljubljana
17:00 CEST	Ubavič 61', 82'	Report	Kovač 32'	Stadium: ŽŠD Ljubljana; Attendance: 30; Referee: Milan Kogej

5 August 2001	Ormož	0–8	Aluminij	Ormož
17:00 CEST		Report	Zemljič 13' (pen.); Majcen 15'; Čeh 28', 35'; Panikvar 80'; Pipenbaher 84'; Pučko 88'; Franci 90+2'	Stadium: Ormož Stadium; Attendance: 300; Referee: Vojko Goričan

5 August 2001	Tabor Sežana	2–5	Dravograd	Sežana
17:00 CEST	Božič 20'; Malnar 45'	Report	Pušnik 5', 34', 75'; Živadinović 24', 56'	Stadium: Rajko Štolfa Stadium; Attendance: 100; Referee: Daniel Avdagić

5 August 2001	Železničar Maribor	5–1	Jadran Dekani	Maribor
17:00 CEST	Šprah 28'; Šunko 49', 54'; Bežik 58'; Bešić 90+3'	Report	Vodopija 74'	Stadium: Tabor Sports Park; Attendance: 150; Referee: Franc Pavlič

Notes

- Ankaran qualified for the next round automatically after Rogoza withdrew from the competition.

== Round of 16 ==
The round of 16 matches took place on 19 September 2001.

19 September 2001	Celje	1–1 (a.e.t.) (1–3 p)	Rudar Velenje	Celje
16:00 CEST	Sivko 90+5'	Report	Dedić 86'	Stadium: Skalna Klet; Attendance: 400; Referee: Robert Zirnstein
	Penalties
	Gobec (penalty scored)		(penalty scored) Bošković; (penalty scored) Plesec; (penalty scored) Podvinski

19 September 2001	Ankaran	0–3	Odranci	Ankaran
16:00 CEST		Report	Gostan 40'; Berendijaš 50'; Borovič 78'	Stadium: ŠRC Katarina; Attendance: 200; Referee: Janez Babnik

19 September 2001	Železničar Maribor	1–0	Koper	Maribor
16:00 CEST	Plošnik 31'	Report		Stadium: Tabor Sports Park; Attendance: 100; Referee: Robert Krajnc

19 September 2001	Domžale	0–2	Šmartno	Domžale
16:00 CEST		Report	Vico 32', 67'	Stadium: Sports Park; Attendance: 200; Referee: Damir Skomina

19 September 2001	Dravograd	0–1	Ljubljana	Dravograd
16:00 CEST		Report	Djukić 84'	Stadium: Dravograd Sports Centre; Attendance: 300; Referee: Damjan Mihalič

19 September 2001	Šmarje pri Jelšah	0–6	Maribor	Šmarje pri Jelšah
16:00 CEST		Report	Balajić 3'; Mauher 38' (o.g.); Pekič 40', 55'; Sztipanovics 44'; Sešlar 57'	Stadium: Sports Park; Attendance: 700; Referee: Andrej Tratnjek

19 September 2001	Aluminij	2–1 (a.e.t.)	Mura	Kidričevo
16:00 CEST	Čeh 80'; Rakič 99'	Report	Dvoršak 64'	Stadium: Aluminij Sports Park; Attendance: 450; Referee: Milan Mitrovič

19 September 2001	Šenčur	0–1	Gorica	Šenčur
19:00 CEST		Report	Težački 32'	Stadium: Sports Park; Attendance: 500; Referee: Drago Kos

== Quarter-finals ==
The first legs of the quarter-finals took place on 10 October, and the second legs took place on 24 October 2001.

=== First legs ===
10 October 2001	Odranci	0–5	Gorica	Odranci
15:30 CEST		Report	Srebrnič 10'; Goga 36', 43'; Kremenović 62'; Mihačič 75'	Stadium: Odranci Sports Park; Attendance: 800; Referee: Aleksander Likič

10 October 2001	Aluminij	4–0	Železničar Maribor	Kidričevo
15:30 CEST	Zemljič 8'; Dončec 19', 85'; Čeh 46'	Report		Stadium: Aluminij Sports Park; Attendance: 300; Referee: Robert Zirnstein

10 October 2001	Rudar Velenje	0–1	Šmartno	Velenje
18:00 CEST		Report	Smajlović 55'	Stadium: Ob Jezeru; Attendance: 1,000; Referee: Darko Čeferin

10 October 2001	Maribor	2–1	Ljubljana	Maribor
18:00 CEST	Pekič 36'; Šarkezi 42'	Report	Djukić 48'	Stadium: Ljudski vrt Attendance: 700; Referee: Boris Jeneš

=== Second legs ===
24 October 2001	Železničar Maribor	2–3 (2–7 agg.)	Aluminij	Maribor
14:30 CEST	Šunko 59', 90'	Report	Rakič 15'; Pipenbaher 81'; Širec 83'	Stadium: Tabor Sports Park; Attendance: 100; Referee: Drago Kos

24 October 2001	Ljubljana	2–3 (3–5 agg.)	Maribor	Ljubljana
14:30 CEST	Hanžič 66'; Hadžić 86'	Report	Pekič 29'; Duro 30'; Kvas 45'	Stadium: ŽŠD Ljubljana; Attendance: 900; Referee: Matjaž Bohinc

24 October 2001	Gorica	5–1 (10–1 agg.)	Odranci	Nova Gorica
14:30 CEST	Kovačević 12', 32'; Hozjan 34'; Šturm 40'; Debenjak 49'	Report	Berendijaš 74'	Stadium: Sports Park; Attendance: 100; Referee: Peter Šart

24 October 2001	Šmartno	1–1 (2–1 agg.)	Rudar Velenje	Šmartno ob Paki
14:30 CEST	Romih 84'	Report	Jeseničnik 79'	Stadium: Šmartno Stadium; Attendance: 700; Referee: Milan Mitrovič

== Semi-finals ==
The first legs of the semi-finals took place on 20 March, and the second legs took place on 3 April 2002.

=== First legs ===
20 March 2002	Aluminij	1–0	Šmartno	Kidričevo
15:30 CET	Pekez 13'	Report		Stadium: Aluminij Sports Park; Attendance: 700; Referee: Srečko Kandare

20 March 2002	Maribor	1–0	Gorica	Maribor
18:00 CET	Duro 38'	Report		Stadium: Ljudski vrt Attendance: 2,500; Referee: Damir Skomina

=== Second legs ===
3 April 2002	Šmartno	2–1 (2–2a agg.)	Aluminij	Šmartno ob Paki
16:30 CEST	Plošnik 29'; Mernik 84'	Report	Čeh 56' (pen.)	Stadium: Šmartno Stadium; Attendance: 1,000; Referee: Milan Mitrovič

3 April 2002	Gorica	3–1 (3–2 agg.)	Maribor	Nova Gorica
16:30 CEST	Kovačević 60'; Puš 71'; Goga 89'	Report	Sztipanovics 47'	Stadium: Sports Park; Attendance: 600; Referee: Robert Krajnc

== Final ==
=== First leg ===
1 May 2002
17:00 CEST

Gorica	4–0	Aluminij
Kršič 5'; Puš 26', 60'; Srebrnič 88'	Report

Nova Gorica Sports Park, Nova Gorica
Attendance: 700
Referee: Damir Skomina

=== Second leg ===
8 May 2002
17:00 CEST

Aluminij	1–2	Gorica
Čeh 54'	Report	Ekmečić 61'; Kremenović 90'

Kidričevo Sports Park, Kidričevo
Attendance: 1,200
Referee: Drago Kos

Gorica won 6–1 on aggregate.
