= List of Slovenian football transfers summer 2009 =

This is a list of transfers in Slovenian football for the 2009 summer transfer window. Only moves featuring a PrvaLiga side are listed.

The summer transfer window opened on 1 July 2009 and will close midnight on 1 September 2009. Players without a club may join one at any time, either during or in between transfer windows.

== PrvaLiga ==
=== Celje ===
In: Note: Flags indicate national team as defined under FIFA eligibility rules; some limited exceptions apply. Players may hold more than one non-FIFA nationality.

No.	Pos.	Nation	Player
15	DF	CRO	Boris Bjelkanović (From (Cyprus) Atromitos Yeroskipou)
-	DF	SVN	Levin Operanovič (From (Slovenia) NK Nafta Lendava)
-	DF	SVN	Boris Mijatovič (From (Slovenia) NK Rudar Velenje)

Out: Note: Flags indicate national team as defined under FIFA eligibility rules; some limited exceptions apply. Players may hold more than one non-FIFA nationality.

No.	Pos.	Nation	Player
3	MF	SVN	Aleš Puš (released)
15	DF	SVN	Janez Zavrl (released)
19	MF	SVN	Gregor Režonja (released)
32	MF	SVN	Nejc Pečnik (To (Portugal) C.D. Nacional)
79	MF	SVN	Jalen Pokorn (To (Slovenia) Olimpija)
23	DF	SVN	Jure Travner (To (England) Watford F.C.)
31	GK	SVN	Aleksander Šeliga (To (Netherlands) Sparta Rotterdam)

=== Domžale ===
In: Note: Flags indicate national team as defined under FIFA eligibility rules; some limited exceptions apply. Players may hold more than one non-FIFA nationality.

No.	Pos.	Nation	Player
8	MF	SVN	Blaž Brezovački (From (Slovenia) NK Nafta Lendava)
7	MF	SRB	Dalibor Teinović (From (Slovenia) NK Primorje)
10	FW	SVN	Damir Pekič (From (Slovenia) NK Nafta Lendava)
3	DF	SVN	Darko Topič (From (Austria) SK Kühnsdorf)
—	MF	SVN	Marko Drevenšek (From (Slovenia) Drava)

Out: Note: Flags indicate national team as defined under FIFA eligibility rules; some limited exceptions apply. Players may hold more than one non-FIFA nationality.

No.	Pos.	Nation	Player
3	DF	SVN	Janez Aljančič (To (Slovenia) NK Maribor)
7	MF	SVN	Miha Novak (released)
8	FW	SVN	Jože Benko (To (Cyprus) AEK Larnaca)
18	MF	SVN	Marko Božič (To (Slovenia) Mura)
27	MF	PAR	Diego Coronel Barrios (released)
30	MF	SVN	Andraž Kirm (To (Poland) Wisła Kraków)
76	DF	SVN	Danijel Brezič (To (Slovenia) Interblock)
25	MF	CRO	Ivan Knezović (released)
23	FW	MNE	Blažo Perutović (released)
77	GK	SVN	Dejan Nemec (released)

=== Drava ===
In: Note: Flags indicate national team as defined under FIFA eligibility rules; some limited exceptions apply. Players may hold more than one non-FIFA nationality.

No.	Pos.	Nation	Player
-	MF	CRO	Marko Trojak (From (Croatia) NK Varteks)
-	MF	SVN	Damir Zagoršek (From (Slovenia) NK Stojnci)
-	GK	SVN	Anže Rupnik (From (Slovenia) SC Bonifika)
-	GK	SVN	Miha Bratušek (On Loan from (Slovenia) NK Maribor)
-	MF	SVN	Gorazd Zajc (On Loan from (Slovenia) NK Maribor)
-	DF	SVN	Klemen Medved (On Loan from (Slovenia) NK Maribor)
-	MF	POR	Ricardo Sousa (From (Portugal) U.D. Leiria)
-	FW	NIG	Abdulrazak Mohammed Ekpoki (From (Belgium) K.A.A. Gent)

Out: Note: Flags indicate national team as defined under FIFA eligibility rules; some limited exceptions apply. Players may hold more than one non-FIFA nationality.

No.	Pos.	Nation	Player
7	MF	BRA	Joao Gabriel da Silva (To (Slovenia) Olimpija)
9	FW	SVN	Senad Tiganj (To (Slovenia) Olimpija)
25	MF	SVN	Lucas Mario Horvat (To (Slovenia) Interblock)
29	GK	SVN	Tomaž Murko (To (Slovenia) NK Nafta Lendava)
77	FW	BIH	Sead Zilić (To FC Rapid București)
27	FW	SVN	Saša Lalovič (released)
—	DF	SVN	Marko Grižonič (released)
—	MF	SVN	Marko Drevenšek (To (Slovenia) Domžale)

=== HIT Gorica ===
In: Note: Flags indicate national team as defined under FIFA eligibility rules; some limited exceptions apply. Players may hold more than one non-FIFA nationality.

No.	Pos.	Nation	Player

Out: Note: Flags indicate national team as defined under FIFA eligibility rules; some limited exceptions apply. Players may hold more than one non-FIFA nationality.

No.	Pos.	Nation	Player
8	MF	SVN	Nebojša Kovačevič (To (Slovenia) FC Koper)
17	DF	SVK	Michal Drahno (To (Slovenia) Mura)

=== Interblock ===
In: Note: Flags indicate national team as defined under FIFA eligibility rules; some limited exceptions apply. Players may hold more than one non-FIFA nationality.

No.	Pos.	Nation	Player
5	MF	CMR	Enow Juvette Tabot (From (Cameroon) Tiko United)
7	MF	SVN	Danijel Brezič (From (Slovenia) NK Domžale)
11	FW	SRB	Vladimir Milenković (From (Slovenia) NK Primorje)
19	DF	SVN	Aleš Kokot (From (Germany) SV Wehen)
21	DF	ENG	Ben Gill (From (England) Weymouth F.C.)
25	MF	SVN	Lucas Mario Horvat (From (Slovenia) NK Drava Ptuj)
-	GK	SVN	Ažbe Jug (From (Slovenia) NK Maribor)
12	ST	SVN	Tomislav Mišura (From (Switzerland) FC Gossau)

Out: Note: Flags indicate national team as defined under FIFA eligibility rules; some limited exceptions apply. Players may hold more than one non-FIFA nationality.

No.	Pos.	Nation	Player
14	MF	SVN	Zoran Zeljkovič (To (Cyprus) APOP Kinyras Peyias FC)
15	MF	SVN	Darijan Matič (To (Romania) FC Rapid București)
19	DF	SVN	Erik Salkič (To (Slovenia) Olimpija)
29	MF	SVN	Enes Rujovič (To (Slovenia) Olimpija)
33	MF	SVN	Dejan Grabič (To (Cyprus) APOP Kinyras Peyias FC)
17	MF	CRO	Krunoslav Rendulić (To (Croatia) Lučko)
12	MF	BIH	Ivan Jolić (To (Croatia) NK Varteks)
—	MF	SVN	Rok Elsner ( (Kuwait) Al Arabi)
25	DF	BIH	Mehmedalija Čović (Loan return to (Belgium) AA Gent)

=== Luka Koper ===
In: Note: Flags indicate national team as defined under FIFA eligibility rules; some limited exceptions apply. Players may hold more than one non-FIFA nationality.

No.	Pos.	Nation	Player
8	MF	SVN	Nebojša Kovačevič (From (Slovenia) ND Gorica)
11	MF	SVN	Miran Pavlin (From (Slovenia) NK Olimpija)
20	DF	SVN	Amir Karič (From (Slovenia) NK Olimpija)
22	GK	SVN	Igor Nenezič (From (Slovenia) NK Primorje)
27	DF	SVN	Damir Hadžič (From (Slovenia) NK Primorje)

Out: Note: Flags indicate national team as defined under FIFA eligibility rules; some limited exceptions apply. Players may hold more than one non-FIFA nationality.

No.	Pos.	Nation	Player
7	MF	SVN	Aleš Mertelj (To (Slovenia) NK Maribor)
9	FW	SVN	Darko Djukič (To (Slovenia) NK Rudar)
12	FW	SVN	Patrik Bordon (Loan return to (Italy) US Lecce)
15	MF	ARG	Juan Sebastian Cruz Vitagliano (released)
17	MF	SVN	Boštjan Kreft (To (Slovenia) NK Rudar)
18	FW	SVN	Vladimir Petrovič (released)
20	MF	SVN	Rok Božič (released)
21	MF	SVN	Aleš Šmon (released)

=== Maribor ===
In: Note: Flags indicate national team as defined under FIFA eligibility rules; some limited exceptions apply. Players may hold more than one non-FIFA nationality.

No.	Pos.	Nation	Player
-	MF	SVN	Aleš Mertelj (From (Slovenia) FC Koper)
-	DF	SVN	Dejan Jurkič (From (Slovakia) SK Kladno)
3	DF	SVN	Janez Aljančič (From (Slovenia) NK Domžale)

Out: Note: Flags indicate national team as defined under FIFA eligibility rules; some limited exceptions apply. Players may hold more than one non-FIFA nationality.

No.	Pos.	Nation	Player
23	DF	SVN	Suad Filekovič (released)
70	MF	CPV	Nilton Fernandes (To (Bulgaria) PFC Chernomorets Burgas)
-	GK	SVN	Ažbe Jug (To (Slovenia) NK Interblock)

=== Nafta ===
In: Note: Flags indicate national team as defined under FIFA eligibility rules; some limited exceptions apply. Players may hold more than one non-FIFA nationality.

No.	Pos.	Nation	Player
9	FW	HUN	József Sebők
18	MF	SVN	Borut Gerenčer (From ?)
20	MF	SVN	Amel Mujakovič (From (Austria) SV Stegersbach)
6	FW	NED	Emil Miljković (From (Netherlands) Fortuna Sittard II)
8	MF	HUN	Béla Koplárovics (From (Hungary) Pécsi Mecsek FC)
22	DF	SVN	Tomaž Murko (From (Slovenia) NK Drava Ptuj)

Out: Note: Flags indicate national team as defined under FIFA eligibility rules; some limited exceptions apply. Players may hold more than one non-FIFA nationality.

No.	Pos.	Nation	Player
9	FW	SVN	Damir Pekič (To (Slovenia) NK Domžale)
17	FW	SVN	Tim Lo Duca (To (Slovenia) NK Rudar Velenje)
19	FW	CRO	Eldin Adilović (To (Romania) FC Unirea Alba Iulia)
20	MF	SVN	Blaž Brezovački (To (Slovenia) NK Domžale)
32	GK	SVN	Stanislav Kuzma (To (Cyprus) Olympiakos Nicosia)
-	DF	SVN	Levin Operanovič (To (Slovenia) NK Celje)

=== Olimpija ===
In: Note: Flags indicate national team as defined under FIFA eligibility rules; some limited exceptions apply. Players may hold more than one non-FIFA nationality.

No.	Pos.	Nation	Player
10	MF	SVN	Enes Rujovič (From (Slovenia) NK Interblock)
8	MF	BRA	Joao Gabriel da Silva (From (Slovenia) NK Drava)
33	DF	SVN	Erik Salkič (From (Slovenia) NK Interblock)
32	FW	SVN	Senad Tiganj (From (Slovenia) NK Drava)
5	DF	BRA	Leonardo Augusto Bonifácio (From (Portugal) Gondomar S.C.)
21	MF	SVN	Miroslav Cvijanovič (From (Slovenia) NK Primorje)
15	MF	SVN	Jalen Pokorn (From (Slovenia) NK Celje)
19	MF	SVN	Rok Roj (From (Slovenia) NK Šentjur)
24	FW	SVN	Almir Rahmanović (From (Slovenia) NK Šentjur)
17	FW	SVN	Anto Pejić (From (Croatia) NK Umag)
—	FW	SVN	Boban Jović (From Aluminij)
26	MF	SVN	Davor Škerjanc (From Primorje)
—	MF	SVN	Andrej Dugolin (From Aluminij)

Out: Note: Flags indicate national team as defined under FIFA eligibility rules; some limited exceptions apply. Players may hold more than one non-FIFA nationality.

No.	Pos.	Nation	Player
-	MF	SVN	Miran Pavlin (To (Slovenia) FC Koper)
-	DF	SVN	Amir Karič (To (Slovenia) FC Koper)
-	GK	SVN	Robert Volk (retired)
-	DF	SVN	Andrej Poljšak (retired)
-	DF	SVN	Alen Ščulac (retired)
-	GK	SVN	Ilija Kitič (retired)
-	DF	SVN	Muamer Vugdalič (To Bela Krajina)

=== Rudar Velenje ===
In: Note: Flags indicate national team as defined under FIFA eligibility rules; some limited exceptions apply. Players may hold more than one non-FIFA nationality.

No.	Pos.	Nation	Player
29	MF	SVN	Boštjan Kreft (From (Slovenia) FC Koper)
9	FW	BIH	Mirza Mešić (From (Bosnia and Herzegovina) FK Sloboda Tuzla)
14	FW	SVN	Tim Lo Duca (From (Slovenia) NK Nafta)
7	MF	SVN	Darko Djukić (From (Slovenia) FC Koper)

Out: Note: Flags indicate national team as defined under FIFA eligibility rules; some limited exceptions apply. Players may hold more than one non-FIFA nationality.

No.	Pos.	Nation	Player
1	GK	SVN	Safet Jahič (released)
14	FW	SVN	Uroš Veselič (To (Hungary) Kecskeméti TE)
20	MF	SVN	Alen Mujanovič (To (Slovenia) Šmartno 1928)
23	DF	SVN	Boris Mijatovič (To (Slovenia) NK Celje)
24	DF	SVN	Joviša Kraljevič (To (Slovenia) Šmartno 1928)
25	MF	SVN	Gorazd Zajc (Loan Return To (Slovenia) NK Maribor)
28	FW	BIH	Ozren Perić (Loan Return To (Austria) SK Sturm Graz)
