= 2003–04 Slovenian Football Cup =

Tournament details
- Country: Slovenia
- Teams: 31

Final positions
- Champions: Maribor (5th title)
- Runners-up: Dravograd

Tournament statistics
- Matches played: 37
- Goals scored: 126 (3.41 per match)
- Top goal scorer: Damir Pekič (8 goals)

The 2003–04 Slovenian Football Cup was the 13th season of the Slovenian Football Cup, Slovenia's football knockout competition.

== Qualified clubs ==
=== 2002–03 Slovenian PrvaLiga members ===
- Celje
- Dravograd
- Gorica
- Koper
- Ljubljana
- Maribor
- Mura
- Olimpija
- Primorje
- Rudar Velenje
- Šmartno

=== Qualified through MNZ Regional Cups ===
- MNZ Ljubljana: Domžale, Bela Krajina, Factor
- MNZ Maribor: Železničar Maribor, Fužinar, Paloma
- MNZ Celje: Krško, Šoštanj
- MNZ Koper: Izola, Jadran
- MNZ Nova Gorica: Bilje, Brda
- MNZ Murska Sobota: Bakovci, Cven
- MNZ Lendava: Bistrica, Nafta Lendava
- MNZG-Kranj: Jesenice, Šenčur
- MNZ Ptuj: Drava Ptuj, Aluminij

== First round ==
The first round matches took place between 30 July and 3 September 2003.

30 July 2003	Rudar Velenje	2–0	Bakovci	Velenje
17:00 CEST	Ibrahimovič 28'; Ekmečić 78'	Report		Stadium: Ob Jezeru; Attendance: 400; Referee: Franc Pavlič

30 July 2003	Fužinar	1–9	Ljubljana	Ravne na Koroškem
17:00 CEST	Hodnik 48'	Report	Karapetrović 28', 79', 82'; Žeželj 31', 57', 59'; Djukić 45', 68', 70'	Stadium: City Stadium; Attendance: 200; Referee: Aleš Partlič

30 July 2003	Jesenice	4–2	Šoštanj	Jesenice
17:00 CEST	Rekić 3', 29'; Simonič 50'; Čamdžić 62'	Report	Švarc 83', 85'	Stadium: Podmežakla Sports Park; Attendance: 350; Referee: Matej Jug

30 July 2003	Železničar Maribor	0–2	Nafta	Maribor
17:00 CEST		Report	Gerenčer 41'; Mavriček 42'	Stadium: Tabor Sports Park; Attendance: 70; Referee: Vojko Goričan

30 July 2003	Drava Ptuj	1–0	Šmartno	Ptuj
17:00 CEST	Smajlovič 7'	Report		Stadium: City Stadium; Attendance: 400; Referee: Daniel Avdagić

30 July 2003	Brda	1–2	Factor	Dobrovo
17:00 CEST	Budihna 59'	Report	Kopasić 12'; Kitič 68'	Stadium: Vipolže Stadium; Attendance: 100; Referee: Roberto Ponis

30 July 2003	Cven	0–3	Gorica	Cven
17:00 CEST		Report	Šturm 48', 66'; Ranić 69'	Stadium: Cven Stadium; Attendance: 150; Referee: Robert Šegula

30 July 2003	Izola	0–4	Olimpija	Izola
17:00 CEST		Report	Jusufbegović 37'; Kosič 45'; Žlogar 57'; Kmetec 63'	Stadium: Izola City Stadium; Attendance: 320; Referee: Emir Huselja

30 July 2003	Šenčur	1–2	Dravograd	Šenčur
20:00 CEST	Stojanov 56'	Report	Gostenčnik 17'; Bukovec 64'	Stadium: Sports Park; Attendance: 200; Referee: Damjan Mihalič

31 July 2003	Aluminij	1–3	Mura	Kidričevo
17:00 CEST	Fridauer 32'	Report	Lunder 12'; Bunjevčević 39'; Obilinović 64'	Stadium: Aluminij Sports Park; Attendance: 400; Referee: Peter Šart

3 August 2003	Bela Krajina	3–1	Bistrica	Črnomelj
17:00 CEST	Sever 14'; Struna 39'; Perše 77'	Report	Godina 79'	Stadium: Loka Stadium; Attendance: 150; Referee: Aleksander Likič

5 August 2003	Paloma	(w/o)^{1}	Jadran

5 August 2003	Bilje	(w/o)^{1}	Domžale

27 August 2003	Krško	0–3	Maribor	Krško
19:30 CEST		Report	Pekič 13', 37', 42'	Stadium: Matija Gubec Stadium; Attendance: 1,200; Referee: Gregor Ihan

3 September 2003	Koper	3–0	Primorje	Koper
17:00 CEST	Božičič 37'; Jakomin 69'; Bogatinov 90'	Report		Stadium: Bonifika Stadium; Attendance: 1,000; Referee: Matjaž Bohinc

Notes

- Paloma and Domžale qualified for the next round automatically after Jadran and Bilje withdrew from the competition.
- Celje had received a bye to the next round.

== Round of 16 ==
The round of 16 matches took place on 17 September 2003.

17 September 2003	Paloma	1–4	Jesenice	Šentilj v Slovenskih Goricah
16:00 CEST	Mikiš 3'	Report	Rekić 9', 90'; Halilović 11'; Čindrak 90'	Stadium: Šentilj Field; Attendance: 70; Referee: Miran Bukovec

17 September 2003	Dravograd	2–0	Domžale	Dravograd
16:00 CEST	Kline 65'; Rebol 90'	Report		Stadium: Dravograd Sports Centre; Attendance: 250; Referee: Marjan Rajh

17 September 2003	Bela Krajina	1–0	Koper	Črnomelj
16:00 CEST	Žagar 90'	Report		Stadium: Loka Stadium; Attendance: 400; Referee: Janez Babnik

17 September 2003	Nafta	3–1	Mura	Lendava
16:00 CEST	Šooš 15', 82'; Mavriček 80' (pen.)	Report	Rakovič 31'	Stadium: Lendava Sports Park; Attendance: 900; Referee: Boris Mihelič

17 September 2003	Ljubljana	3–1	Olimpija	Ljubljana
16:00 CEST	Čačić 36'; Kujović 45' (pen.); Karapetrović 70'	Report	Jusufbegović 56'	Stadium: ŽŠD Ljubljana; Attendance: 1,000; Referee: Damir Skomina

17 September 2003	Factor	1–8	Celje	Ljubljana
16:00 CEST	Jakopič 60'	Report	Brulc 8', 75'; Koren 24', 62', 90'; Vršič 58'; Maletić 72'; Kvas 76'	Stadium: Štefan Bele Sports Park; Attendance: 150; Referee: Jože Vehar

17 September 2003	Maribor	2–0	Drava Ptuj	Maribor
18:00 CEST	Pekič 8'; Žnuderl 28'	Report		Stadium: Ljudski vrt Attendance: 1,000; Referee: Boris Jeneš

17 September 2003	Rudar Velenje	2–1	Gorica	Velenje
18:00 CEST	Mujaković 41'; Ibrahimovič 72'	Report	Težački 78'	Stadium: Ob Jezeru; Attendance: 350; Referee: Robert Šegula

== Quarter-finals ==
The first legs of the quarter-finals took place on 1 October, and the second legs took place between 15 and 23 October 2003.

=== First legs ===
1 October 2003	Bela Krajina	0–0	Ljubljana	Črnomelj
15:30 CEST		Report		Stadium: Loka Stadium; Attendance: 500; Referee: Robert Šegula

1 October 2003	Dravograd	3–1	Nafta	Dravograd
15:30 CEST	Gostenčnik 5'; Žager 84'; Bukovec 86'	Report	Novak 10'	Stadium: Dravograd Sports Centre; Attendance: 200; Referee: Darko Čeferin

1 October 2003	Rudar Velenje	2–1	Jesenice	Velenje
17:00 CEST	Šmon 40'; Romih 82'	Report	Sem. Tiganj 30'	Stadium: Ob Jezeru; Attendance: 400; Referee: Srečko Kandare

1 October 2003	Maribor	2–0	Celje	Maribor
18:00 CEST	Pekič 21' (pen.); Karić 81' (pen.)	Report		Stadium: Ljudski vrt Attendance: 2,500; Referee: Robert Krajnc

=== Second legs ===
15 October 2003	Ljubljana	1–0 (a.e.t.) (1–0 agg.)	Bela Krajina	Ljubljana
14:30 CEST	Zavrl 112'	Report		Stadium: ŽŠD Ljubljana; Attendance: 500; Referee: Matjaž Bohinc

15 October 2003	Jesenice	3–1 (4–3 agg.)	Rudar Velenje	Jesenice
14:30 CEST	Čamdžić 6'; E. Tiganj 34'; Rekić 36'	Report	Ekmečić 55'	Stadium: Podmežakla Sports Park; Attendance: 1,200; Referee: Janez Babnik

22 October 2003	Nafta	1–2 (2–5 agg.)	Dravograd	Lendava
14:30 CEST	Mavriček 86'	Report	Rebol 66'; Gostenčnik 90'	Stadium: Lendava Sports Park; Attendance: 400; Referee: Robert Krajnc

23 October 2003	Celje	5–4 (5–6 agg.)	Maribor	Celje
20:10 CEST	Sešlar 34'; Čadikovski 68'; Koren 73', 89'; Plastovski 74'	Report	Mešanović 23'; Pekič 54', 70'; Mostarlić 84'	Stadium: Arena Petrol; Attendance: 1,000; Referee: Peter Šart

== Semi-finals ==
The first legs of the semi-finals took place on 7 April, and the second legs took place on 21 April 2004.

=== First legs ===
7 April 2004	Ljubljana	2–1	Dravograd	Ljubljana
17:00 CEST	Sen. Tiganj 5' (pen.); Zore 72'	Report	Ljubanić 67'	Stadium: ŽŠD Ljubljana; Attendance: 150; Referee: Darko Čeferin

7 April 2004	Maribor	4–0	Jesenice	Maribor
18:00 CEST	Beršnjak 63'; Mujanovič 74'; Djukić 86'; Tadić 89' (o.g.)	Report		Stadium: Ljudski vrt Attendance: 800; Referee: Srečko Kandare

=== Second legs ===
21 April 2004	Jesenice	1–2 (1–6 agg.)	Maribor	Jesenice
16:30 CEST	Golob 16' (o.g.)	Report	Mujanovič 39'; Plošnik 80'	Stadium: Podmežakla Sports Park; Attendance: 2,300; Referee: Janez Babnik

21 April 2004	Dravograd	1–0 (2a–2 agg.)	Ljubljana	Dravograd
16:30 CEST	Ljubanić 68'	Report		Stadium: Dravograd Sports Centre; Attendance: 500; Referee: Damir Skomina

== Final ==
=== First leg ===
19 May 2004
18:00 CEST

Maribor	4–0	Dravograd
Pekič 5' (pen.); Rakič 16'; Franci 44'; Žnuderl 88'	Report

Ljudski vrt, Maribor
Attendance: 1,500
Referee: Robert Krajnc

=== Second leg ===
26 May 2004
17:00 CEST

Dravograd	4–3	Maribor
Gostenčnik 6'; Srša 61'; Ljubanić 69'; Frajdl 90'	Report	Žnuderl 3' (pen.), 89'; Mujanovič 44'

Dravograd Sports Centre, Dravograd
Attendance: 700
Referee: Srečko Kandare

Maribor won 7–4 on aggregate.
