= 2002–03 Slovenian Football Cup =

Tournament details
- Country: Slovenia
- Teams: 32

Final positions
- Champions: Olimpija (4th title)
- Runners-up: Celje

Tournament statistics
- Matches played: 38
- Goals scored: 155 (4.08 per match)
- Top goal scorer: Andrej Kvas (7 goals)

The 2002–03 Slovenian Football Cup was the twelfth season of the Slovenian Football Cup, Slovenia's football knockout competition.

== Qualified clubs ==
=== 2001–02 Slovenian PrvaLiga members ===
- Celje
- Domžale
- Gorica
- Koper
- Korotan Prevalje
- Maribor
- Mura
- Olimpija
- Primorje
- Rudar Velenje
- Šmartno
- Triglav Kranj

=== Qualified through MNZ Regional Cups ===
- MNZ Ljubljana: Ljubljana, Bela Krajina, Livar
- MNZ Maribor: Železničar Maribor, Dravograd, Pohorje
- MNZ Celje: Krško, Vransko
- MNZ Koper: Korte, Jadran
- MNZ Nova Gorica: Bilje, Tolmin
- MNZ Murska Sobota: Tišina, Roma
- MNZ Lendava: Črenšovci, Nafta Lendava
- MNZG-Kranj: Bled, Britof
- MNZ Ptuj: Stojnci, Aluminij

== First round ==
The first round matches took place between 3 and 14 August 2002.

3 August 2002	Roma	1–11	Gorica	Tišina
17:00 CEST	Kovač 49', 73'	Report	Ekmečić 18', 33', 51', 89'; Panič 28'; Goga 34'; Starčevič 49', 90'; Kokot 57' (pen.); Kremenović 72'; Živec 73'	Stadium: Tišina Stadium; Attendance: 700; Referee: Boris Jeneš

3 August 2002	Nafta	2–1	Primorje	Lendava
17:00 CEST	Utroša 30' (pen.); Doma 34'	Report	Ranić 86'	Stadium: Lendava Sports Park; Attendance: 300; Referee: Emir Huselja

4 August 2002	Korte	2–1	Bilje	Malija
17:00 CEST	Čendak 37', 60'	Report	Doplihar 54'	Stadium: Malija Stadium; Attendance: 70; Referee: Franc Pavlič

4 August 2002	Bela Krajina	1–5	Olimpija	Črnomelj
17:00 CEST	Penica 50'	Report	Žlogar 18', 89'; Jusufbegović 29'; Kosič 80', 82'	Stadium: Loka Stadium; Attendance: 900; Referee: Damjan Mihalič

4 August 2002	Stojnci	1–6	Aluminij	Stojnci
17:00 CEST	Štebih 74'	Report	Čeh 30'; Dončec 43'; Pekez 50'; Franci 58'; Jevđenič 68', 73'	Stadium: Stojnci Sports Park; Attendance: 250; Referee: Radenko Kmetec

4 August 2002	Železničar Maribor	3–0	Tolmin	Maribor
17:00 CEST	Šprah 32'; Pavlin 45'; M. Koren 83'	Report		Stadium: Tabor Sports Park; Attendance: 106; Referee: Miran Bukovec

4 August 2002	Bled	1–9	Mura	Bled
17:00 CEST	Tancar 55'	Report	Vogrinčič 4', 80'; Mesarič 13'; Burčul 29'; Dvoršak 32', 85'; Trenevski 45'; Kožul 76'; Cifer 90'	Stadium: Bled Sports Centre; Attendance: 300; Referee: Boris Tošeski

4 August 2002	Jadran	2–1	Črenšovci	Kozina
17:00 CEST	Božič 28'; Kobal 72'	Report	Kolarič 90'	Stadium: Krvavi Potok Stadium; Attendance: 100; Referee: Jože Vehar

4 August 2002	Pohorje	0–8	Dravograd	Ruše
17:00 CEST		Report	Drobne 6', 33', 34'; Geld 13'; Tisnikar 41'; Magdič 45', 59'; Jamnik 76'	Stadium: NK Pohorje Stadium; Attendance: 200; Referee: Boris Mihelič

4 August 2002	Korotan Prevalje	1–1 (a.e.t.) (5–4 p)	Koper	Prevalje
17:00 CEST	Grizold 80'	Report	Ipavec 86'	Stadium: Stadion na Prevaljah; Attendance: 400; Referee: Milan Mitrovič
	Penalties
	Grizold (penalty scored); Miškič (penalty scored); Križan (penalty scored); Podvinski (penalty scored); Jolič (penalty scored)		(penalty scored) Jermaniš; (penalty scored) Kovačević; (penalty scored) Ipavec; (penalty scored) Bunjevčević

4 August 2002	Livar	1–2	Šmartno	Ivančna Gorica
17:00 CEST	Usnik 60'	Report	Smajlović 54'; Šimundža 83'	Stadium: Ivančna Gorica Stadium; Attendance: 700; Referee: Milan Kogej

4 August 2002	Tišina	0–6	Domžale	Tišina
17:00 CEST		Report	Stranjak 34'; Žinič 45'; Pandža 60', 75', 90'; Feigel 83'	Stadium: Tišina Stadium; Attendance: 400; Referee: Vojko Goričan

4 August 2002	Vransko	1–6	Celje	Vransko
17:00 CEST	Puckmeister 14'	Report	Vidovič 17'; Beršnjak 34'; Kvas 52'; Maletić 61'; R. Koren 63'; Petrič 75'	Stadium: Videm Stadium; Attendance: 300; Referee: Gregor Ihan

4 August 2002	Krško	0–3	Ljubljana	Krško
19:30 CEST		Report	Kmetec 71'; Živadinović 85'; Pate 88'	Stadium: Matija Gubec Stadium; Attendance: 500; Referee: Peter Šart

14 August 2002	Triglav Kranj	2–3	Britof	Kranj
17:00 CEST	Markelj 29' (pen.); Vodopija 42'	Report	Pavlin 15'; Dolenc 73'; Stojnić 90'	Stadium: Stanko Mlakar Stadium; Attendance: 300; Referee: Roberto Ponis

14 August 2002	Maribor	1–0	Rudar Velenje	Maribor
19:00 CEST	Pitamic 52'	Report		Stadium: Ljudski vrt Attendance: 1,000; Referee: Andrej Tratnjek

== Round of 16 ==
The round of 16 matches took place on 11 September 2002.

11 September 2002	Nafta	2–1	Jadran	Lendava
16:00 CEST	Preininger 37'; Gostan 55'	Report	Rastovac 90' (pen.)	Stadium: Lendava Sports Park; Attendance: 200; Referee: Marjan Rajh

11 September 2002	Dravograd	4–2	Ljubljana	Dravograd
16:00 CEST	Drobne 2', 55'; Rebol 18', 31'	Report	Žeželj 65' (pen.); Šumnik 84' (o.g.)	Stadium: Dravograd Sports Centre; Attendance: 500; Referee: Damir Skomina

11 September 2002	Celje	2–0	Mura	Celje
16:00 CEST	Jožef 74'; R. Koren 82'	Report		Stadium: Skalna Klet; Attendance: 400; Referee: Drago Kos

11 September 2002	Domžale	0–3	Korotan Prevalje	Domžale
16:00 CEST		Report	Brkić 29'; Jolič 46'; Komar 87'	Stadium: Sports Park; Attendance: 500; Referee: Bojan Brence

11 September 2002	Šmartno	1–2	Olimpija	Šmartno ob Paki
16:00 CEST	Šimundža 58'	Report	Puc 4', 40'	Stadium: Šmartno Stadium; Attendance: 1,200; Referee: Robert Šegula

11 September 2002	Britof	0–2	Maribor	Britof
16:00 CEST		Report	Čorović 23', 80'	Stadium: NK Britof Stadium; Attendance: 1,000; Referee: Daniel Avdagić

11 September 2002	Korte	1–3	Gorica	Malija
16:00 CEST	Luznar 90'	Report	Kokot 12' (pen.); Ekmečić 34', 64'	Stadium: Malija Stadium; Attendance: 100; Referee: Aleksander Likič

11 September 2002	Aluminij	5–0	Železničar Maribor	Kidričevo
16:00 CEST	Rakič 16' (pen.), 89' (pen.); Pekez 24'; Čeh 34'; Perkovič 61'	Report		Stadium: Aluminij Sports Park; Attendance: 250; Referee: Vinko Vozlič

== Quarter-finals ==
The first legs of the quarter-finals took place on 2 October, and the second legs took place on 23 October 2002.

=== First legs ===
2 October 2002	Celje	6–1	Gorica	Celje
15:30 CEST	Kvas 20' (pen.), 52'; Beršnjak 22', 44'; Težački 31' (o.g.); Čadikovski 58'	Report	Budihna 55'	Stadium: Skalna Klet; Attendance: 400; Referee: Darko Čeferin

2 October 2002	Aluminij	1–1	Korotan Prevalje	Kidričevo
15:30 CEST	Rakič 89'	Report	Jolič 66'	Stadium: Aluminij Sports Park; Attendance: 300; Referee: Janez Babnik

2 October 2002	Nafta	0–2	Dravograd	Lendava
15:30 CEST		Report	Rebol 75', 78'	Stadium: Lendava Sports Park; Attendance: 300; Referee: Srečko Kandare

2 October 2002	Olimpija	0–0	Maribor	Ljubljana
18:00 CEST		Report		Stadium: Bežigrad Stadium; Attendance: 5,200; Referee: Robert Krajnc

=== Second legs ===
23 October 2002	Korotan Prevalje	2–1 (3–2 agg.)	Aluminij	Prevalje
14:30 CEST	Huseinović 37', 87'	Report	Rakič 19' (pen.)	Stadium: Stadion na Prevaljah; Attendance: 300; Referee: Damir Skomina

23 October 2002	Gorica	1–3 (2–9 agg.)	Celje	Nova Gorica
14:30 CEST	Rodić 14'	Report	Kvas 15', 34'; Plastovski 76'	Stadium: Sports Park; Attendance: 150; Referee: Drago Kos

23 October 2002	Dravograd	2–1 (4–1 agg.)	Nafta	Dravograd
14:30 CEST	Rebol 18', 31'	Report	Šoos 75'	Stadium: Dravograd Sports Centre; Attendance: 200; Referee: Robert Krajnc

23 October 2002	Maribor	3–4 (3–4 agg.)	Olimpija	Maribor
18:00 CEST	Rakovič 5', 88'; Djuranović 54'	Report	Rudonja 26', 88'; Kosič 38', 76' (pen.); Jusufbegović 43'	Stadium: Ljudski vrt Attendance: 4,000; Referee: Matjaž Bohinc

== Semi-finals ==
The first legs of the semi-finals took place on 19 March, and the second legs took place on 9 April 2003.

=== First legs ===
19 March 2003	Celje	2–1	Dravograd	Celje
15:30 CEST	R. Koren 52'; Maletić 70'	Report	Budimir 23' (o.g.)	Stadium: Skalna Klet; Attendance: 600; Referee: Damir Skomina

19 March 2003	Olimpija	(w/o)^{1}	Korotan Prevalje

=== Second legs ===
9 April 2003	Dravograd	0–2 (1–4 agg.)	Celje	Dravograd
16:00 CEST		Report	Sešlar 9'; R. Koren 21'	Stadium: Dravograd Sports Centre; Attendance: 1,100; Referee: Robert Krajnc

9 April 2003	Korotan Prevalje	(w/o)^{1}	Olimpija

Notes

- Olimpija qualified for the final automatically, as Korotan Prevalje was excluded from the competition.

== Final ==
=== First leg ===
14 May 2003
18:00 CEST

Olimpija	1–1	Celje
Puc 90'	Report	Kvas 39' (pen.)

Bežigrad Stadium, Ljubljana
Attendance: 4,000
Referee: Darko Čeferin

=== Second leg ===
21 May 2003
17:00 CEST

Celje	2–2	Olimpija
R. Koren 15'; Kvas 72'	Report	Žlogar 59'; Prosinečki 65'

Skalna Klet, Celje
Attendance: 3,000
Referee: Robert Krajnc

3–3 on aggregate. Olimpija won the cup on away goals.
