= 2005–06 Slovenian Football Cup =

Tournament details
- Country: Slovenia
- Teams: 28

Final positions
- Champions: Koper (1st title)
- Runners-up: Celje

Tournament statistics
- Matches played: 29
- Goals scored: 99 (3.41 per match)
- Top goal scorer(s): Darko Kremenovič; Dejan Rusič; Nenad Đaković; Duško Stajić (4 goals each)

The 2005–06 Slovenian Football Cup was the 15th season of the Slovenian Football Cup, Slovenia's football knockout competition. Lower league teams played in the first two rounds and the Slovenian PrvaLiga teams joined in the Round of 16.

== Qualified clubs ==
=== 2005–06 Slovenian PrvaLiga members ===
- Bela Krajina
- Celje
- Domžale
- Drava Ptuj
- Gorica
- Koper
- Maribor
- Nafta Lendava
- Primorje
- Rudar Velenje

Additional place: Zagorje

=== Qualified through MNZ Regional Cups ===
- MNZ Ljubljana: Svoboda, Livar, Dolomiti Dobrova
- MNZ Maribor: Malečnik, Dravograd, Pesnica
- MNZ Koper: Jadran Dekani, Korte
- MNZ Nova Gorica: Tolmin, Brda
- MNZ Murska Sobota: Ižakovci, Tišina
- MNZ Lendava: Črenšovci
- MNZG-Kranj: Triglav Kranj, Jesenice
- MNZ Ptuj: Aluminij, Ormož

== First round ==
The first round matches took place between 24 August and 7 September 2005.

24 August 2005	Jadran Dekani	0–2	Jesenice	Dekani
16:30 CEST		Report	Kumalić 26' (pen.), 90'	Stadium: Dekani Sports Park; Attendance: 50; Referee: Tomaž Babnik

24 August 2005	Korte	3–1	Dolomiti Dobrova	Izola
16:30 CEST	Reljić 27'; Peršič 58'; Baruca 90'	Report	Mikolič 89' (pen.)	Stadium: Malija Stadium; Attendance: 30; Referee: Aleksander Likič

24 August 2005	Brda	4–3	Svoboda	Dobrovo
16:30 CEST	Winkler 47'; Črnigoj 58' (pen.), 75'; Fikfak 90'	Report	Šutej 20'; Malkić 45'; O. Begić 85' (pen.)	Stadium: Vipolže Stadium; Attendance: 30; Referee: Roberto Ponis

24 August 2005	Livar	7–0	Tolmin	Ivančna Gorica
16:30 CEST	Perme 34', 68'; Marič 35'; Bracović 51'; Merkužič 54'; Sadar 56'; Kastelic 63'	Report		Stadium: Ivančna Gorica Stadium; Attendance: 100; Referee: Jože Vehar

24 August 2005	Tišina	3–0	Ormož	Tišina
16:30 CEST	Hozjan 6'; Faršang 9', 89'	Report		Stadium: Tišina Stadium; Attendance: 100; Referee: Gregor Gostenčnik

31 August 2005	Črenšovci	0–4	Pesnica	Črenšovci
16:30 CEST		Report	Štebih 32'; Hrgić 73'; Zorec 79'; Strelec 89'	Stadium: Črenšovci Sports Park; Attendance: 100; Referee: Vojko Goričan

7 September 2005	Ižakovci	1–9	Malečnik	Ižakovci
16:00 CEST	Krapec 51'	Report	Partlič 38'; D. Nešić 50', 57', 87'; M. Nešić 60', 79'; Đaković 74', 83', 89'	Stadium: Igrišče v Ižakovcih; Attendance: 60; Referee: Boris Jeneš

== Second round ==
The second round matches took place on 14 September 2005.

14 September 2005	Triglav Kranj	0–1	Brda	Kranj
16:00 CEST		Report	Fikfak 89'	Stadium: Stanko Mlakar Stadium; Attendance: 100; Referee: Tomaž Babnik

14 September 2005	Korte	2–1	Jesenice	Izola
16:00 CEST	Bašič 62'; Baruca 80'	Report	Alagić 43'	Stadium: Malija Stadium; Attendance: 60; Referee: Boris Tošeski

14 September 2005	Aluminij	5–1	Tišina	Kidričevo
16:00 CEST	Ozim 15', 85'; Vtič 22'; Dončec 33'; Šimenko 79'	Report	Kous 5'	Stadium: Aluminij Sports Park; Attendance: 55; Referee: Vojko Goričan

14 September 2005	Livar	4–2	Malečnik	Ivančna Gorica
16:00 CEST	Biščan 19', 53'; Perme 74'; Kokalj 76'	Report	Novak 2'; Đaković 16'	Stadium: Ivančna Gorica Stadium; Attendance: 100; Referee: Roberto Ponis

14 September 2005	Pesnica	1–1 (a.e.t.) (5–4 p)	Dravograd	Pesnica
16:00 CEST	Strelec 38'	Report	Čare 45' (o.g.)	Stadium: Pesnica Sports Park; Attendance: 50; Referee: Aleš Partlič
	Penalties
	Mačukat (penalty scored); Ledinek (penalty scored); Koletnik (penalty scored); Lorenčič (penalty scored); Antić (penalty scored)		(penalty scored) Pevec; (penalty scored) Cizej; (penalty scored) Grobovšek; (penalty scored) Čavnik

== Round of 16 ==
The round of 16 matches took place on 28 September and 19 October 2005.

28 September 2005	Korte	1–0	Aluminij	Izola
15:00 CEST	A. Begić 87'	Report		Stadium: Malija Stadium; Attendance: 50; Referee: Dragoslav Perič

28 September 2005	Pesnica	1–8	Maribor	Pesnica
15:00 CEST	Štebih 20'	Report	Jelić 5'; Zajc 35', 40', 53'; Medved 69'; Bečiri 74'; Siberie 86', 88'	Stadium: Pesnica Sports Park; Attendance: 400; Referee: Vojko Goričan

28 September 2005	Bela Krajina	2–2 (a.e.t.) (2–4 p)	Koper	Črnomelj
15:00 CEST	Mujaković 90'; Penica 92'	Report	Drobne 44'; Božič 101'	Stadium: Loka Stadium; Attendance: 200; Referee: Boris Tošeski
	Penalties
	Mujaković (penalty scored); Čaušević (penalty scored)		(penalty scored) Handanović; (penalty scored) Peršič; (penalty scored) Kremenović; (penalty scored) Volaš

28 September 2005	Livar	1–0	Nafta	Ivančna Gorica
15:00 CEST	Marič 76'	Report		Stadium: Ivančna Gorica Stadium; Attendance: 300; Referee: Aleš Partlič

28 September 2005	Rudar Velenje	1–1 (a.e.t.) (4–3 p)	Drava Ptuj	Velenje
16:30 CEST	Softić 58'	Report	Chietti 90'	Stadium: Ob Jezeru; Attendance: 200; Referee: Drago Kos
	Penalties
	Ibrahimovič (penalty scored); Dragić (penalty scored); Borštnar (penalty scored); Mujaković (penalty scored)		(penalty scored) Trenevski; (penalty scored) Čeh; (penalty scored) Štromajer

28 September 2005	Celje	2–0	Brda	Celje
18:00 CEST	Chibuike 20'; Stajić 86'	Report		Stadium: Arena Petrol; Attendance: 250; Referee: Davor Drečnik

28 September 2005	Gorica	2–0	Primorje	Nova Gorica
18:00 CEST	Srebrnič 39'; Ranić 49' (pen.)	Report		Stadium: Sports Park; Attendance: 600; Referee: Darko Čeferin

19 October 2005	Zagorje	0–3	Domžale	Zagorje ob Savi
14:30 CEST		Report	Jhonnes 14'; Rakovič 24', 37'	Stadium: Zagorje City Stadium; Attendance: 100; Referee: Miran Bukovec

== Quarter-finals ==
The quarter-finals took place on 19 October and 2 November 2005.

19 October 2005	Celje	5–1	Livar	Celje
17:30 CEST	Beršnjak 18' (pen.); Robnik 43'; Stajić 78', 85', 90'	Report	Marič 48'	Stadium: Arena Petrol; Attendance: 250; Referee: Janez Babnik

19 October 2005	Maribor	1–0	Korte	Maribor
18:00 CEST	Ošlaj 17'	Report		Stadium: Ljudski vrt Attendance: 500; Referee: Andrej Tratnjek

19 October 2005	Rudar Velenje	0–1	Gorica	Velenje
18:00 CEST		Report	Ranić 18'	Stadium: Ob Jezeru; Attendance: 300; Referee: Robert Krajnc

2 November 2005	Koper	2–1	Domžale	Koper
13:00 CET	Matić 60' (o.g.); Kremenović 80'	Report	Rakovič 30'	Stadium: Bonifika Stadium; Attendance: 350; Referee: Matej Jug

== Semi-finals ==
The first legs of the semi-finals took place on 19 April, and the second legs took place on 9 May 2006.

=== First legs ===
19 April 2006	Celje	1–0	Maribor	Celje
20:00 CEST	Rusič 24'	Report		Stadium: Arena Petrol; Attendance: 1,300; Referee: Matjaž Bohinc

19 April 2006	Gorica	0–2	Koper	Nova Gorica
19:00 CEST		Report	Kremenović 39', 49'	Stadium: Sports Park; Attendance: 900; Referee: Drago Kos

=== Second legs ===
9 May 2006	Koper	0–1 (2–1 agg.)	Gorica	Koper
17:00 CEST		Report	Demirović 76' (pen.)	Stadium: Bonifika Stadium; Attendance: 1,200; Referee: Robert Krajnc

9 May 2006	Maribor	1–2 (1–3 agg.)	Celje	Maribor
17:00 CEST	Pekič 8'	Report	Rusič 51', 81'	Stadium: Ljudski vrt Attendance: 3,500; Referee: Matej Jug

== Final ==
24 May 2006
20:00 CEST

Celje	1–1 (a.e.t.)	Koper
Rusič 75'	Report	Rudonja 5'
Penalties
Brezič (penalty scored); Gobec (penalty missed); Urbanč (penalty scored); Križnik (penalty scored)	3–5	(penalty scored) Drobne; (penalty scored) Knezović; (penalty scored) Lovrečič; (penalty scored) Karič; (penalty scored) Rudonja

Arena Petrol, Celje
Attendance: 3,200
Referee: Darko Čeferin
