= 2000–01 Slovenian Football Cup =

Football tournament season

Tournament details
- Country: Slovenia
- Teams: 32

Final positions
- Champions: Gorica (1st title)
- Runners-up: Olimpija

Tournament statistics
- Matches played: 38
- Goals scored: 143 (3.76 per match)
- Top goal scorer: Anton Žlogar (7 goals)

The 2000–01 Slovenian Football Cup was the tenth season of the Slovenian Football Cup, Slovenia's football knockout competition.

== Qualified clubs ==
=== 1999–2000 Slovenian PrvaLiga members ===
- Beltinci
- Celje
- Domžale
- Dravograd
- Gorica
- Korotan Prevalje
- Maribor
- Mura
- Olimpija
- Pohorje
- Primorje
- Rudar Velenje

=== Qualified through MNZ Regional Cups ===
- MNZ Ljubljana: Elan, Bela Krajina, Livar
- MNZ Maribor: Železničar Maribor, Pobrežje, Paloma
- MNZ Celje: Šentjur, Vransko
- MNZ Koper: Korte, Jadran
- MNZ Nova Gorica: Renče, Tolmin
- MNZ Murska Sobota: Bakovci, Kema Puconci
- MNZ Lendava: Nafta Lendava, Odranci
- MNZG-Kranj: Triglav Kranj, Bled
- MNZ Ptuj: Boč, Aluminij

== First round ==
The first round matches took place between 15 July and 6 August 2000.

15 July 2000	Vransko	1–4	Maribor	Vransko
17:30 CEST	Korun 53'	Report	Balajić 45'; Ekmečić 77', 90'; Cipot 85'	Stadium: Videm Stadium; Attendance: 700; Referee: Andrej Tratnjek

16 July 2000	Livar	0–2	Korotan Prevalje	Ivančna Gorica
16:30 CEST		Report	Popescu 44', 88'	Stadium: Ivančna Gorica Stadium; Attendance: 500; Referee: Robert Šegula

16 July 2000	Korte	1–6	Gorica	Malija
17:30 CEST	Baruca 25'	Report	Srebrnič 34'; Gutalj 39', 76'; Žlogar 51', 66', 80'	Stadium: Malija Stadium; Attendance: 500; Referee: Aleksander Likič

16 July 2000	Bled	0–7	Dravograd	Bled
17:30 CEST		Report	Koren 11', 40', 81'; Kitić 28'; Vidovič 38', 88'; Cirkvenčič 70'	Stadium: Bled Sports Centre; Attendance: 100; Referee: Robert Zirnstein

16 July 2000	Olimpija	1–0 (a.e.t.)	Celje	Šmartno ob Paki
17:30 CEST	Jukić 113'	Report		Stadium: Šmartno Stadium; Attendance: 3,000; Referee: Matjaž Bohinc

16 July 2000	Pohorje	0–1	Mura	Ruše
17:30 CEST		Report	Cifer 90+3'	Stadium: NK Pohorje Stadium; Attendance: 300; Referee: Milan Mitrovič

16 July 2000	Kema Puconci	1–5	Domžale	Puconci
17:30 CEST	Banfi 59'	Report	Kostić 42'; Šalja 72', 82'; Kušar 80'; Turković 85'	Stadium: Igrišče v Puconcih; Attendance: 350; Referee: Niko Vivod

16 July 2000	Renče	0–5	Primorje	Renče
17:30 CEST		Report	Gregorič 52'; Pate 54', 73'; Reljić 60'; Starčevič 78'	Stadium: Renče Sports Park; Attendance: 300; Referee: Damjan Mihalič

16 July 2000	Železničar Maribor	1–4	Rudar Velenje	Maribor
17:30 CEST	Dvoršak 2'	Report	Sprečaković 15'; Spasojević 30'; Dragić 39'; Šumnik 54'	Stadium: Tabor Sports Park; Attendance: 150; Referee: Drago Kos

6 August 2000	Aluminij	10–0	Bela Krajina	Kidričevo
17:00 CEST	Majcen 4', 64', 89'; Jevđenič 32'; Franci 48'; Fridauer 49'; A. Čeh 50', 83', 87'; Pučko 55'	Report		Stadium: Aluminij Sports Park; Attendance: 250; Referee: Edi Kerčmar

6 August 2000	Tolmin	0–1	Bakovci	Tolmin
17:00 CEST		Report	Benko 72'	Stadium: Brajda; Attendance: 200; Referee: Janez Babnik

6 August 2000	Boč	0–4	Paloma	Poljčane
17:00 CEST		Report	Štorgelj 13'; Velički 29', 47'; Žabota 43'	Stadium: NK Boč Stadium; Attendance: 220; Referee: Boris Jeneš

6 August 2000	Triglav Kranj	7–2	Odranci	Kranj
17:00 CEST	Srovin 4', 50', 78'; Feigel 10' (pen.); Mrak 38'; J. Žagar 40'; Plastovski 90'	Report	Zadravec 33'; Virag 88'	Stadium: Stanko Mlakar Stadium; Attendance: 400; Referee: Bojan Brence

6 August 2000	Elan	1–0	Pobrežje	Krško
17:00 CEST	Kefert 42'	Report		Stadium: Matija Gubec Stadium; Attendance: 150; Referee: Milan Kogej

6 August 2000	Nafta	5–0	Beltinci	Lendava
17:00 CEST	Gostan 19', 80'; Ulen 29'; Utroša 53'; Varga 59'	Report		Stadium: Lendava Sports Park; Attendance: 600; Referee: Zoran Novarlič

6 August 2000	Jadran	2–1	Šentjur	Kozina
17:00 CEST	Udovič 47'; Rastoder 69'	Report	Založnik 85'	Stadium: Krvavi Potok Stadium; Attendance: 250; Referee: Marjan Rajh

== Round of 16 ==
The round of 16 matches took place between 5 and 7 September 2000.

5 September 2000	Paloma	0–9	Olimpija	Sladki Vrh
16:30 CEST		Report	Rakovič 19', 65'; Cimirotič 41'; Agič 44'; Kosič 56'; Kujović 72', 89'; Puc 78', 84'	Stadium: NK Paloma Stadium; Attendance: 800; Referee: Andrej Tratnjek

5 September 2000	Gorica	3–0	Domžale	Nova Gorica
16:30 CEST	Srebrnič 67'; Žlogar 77'; Ipavec 88'	Report		Stadium: Sports Park; Attendance: 300; Referee: Darko Čeferin

6 September 2000	Aluminij	0–2	Maribor	Kidričevo
16:30 CEST		Report	N. Čeh 42'; Ekmečić 68'	Stadium: Aluminij Sports Park; Attendance: 1,200; Referee: Matjaž Bohinc

6 September 2000	Triglav Kranj	1–3	Primorje	Kranj
16:30 CEST	Mrak 31'	Report	Pate 70' (pen.), 78'; Barut 86'	Stadium: Stanko Mlakar Stadium; Attendance: 500; Referee: Robert Zirnstein

6 September 2000	Jadran	3–0	Nafta	Kozina
16:30 CEST	Pirc 21' (pen.); Udovič 51'; Begić 90+4'	Report		Stadium: Krvavi Potok Stadium; Attendance: 150; Referee: Milan Kogej

6 September 2000	Mura	0–2	Dravograd	Murska Sobota
16:30 CEST		Report	Kitić 20'; Cirkvenčič 85'	Stadium: Fazanerija City Stadium; Attendance: 800; Referee: Stevo Govedarević

6 September 2000	Rudar Velenje	1–0	Korotan Prevalje	Velenje
18:00 CEST	Spasojević 14'	Report		Stadium: Ob Jezeru; Attendance: 251; Referee: Srečko Kandare

7 September 2000	Bakovci	1–2	Elan	Bakovci
16:30 CEST	Benko 18'	Report	Dobrijević 52', 72'	Stadium: ŠRC Bakovci; Attendance: 250; Referee: Bojan Brence

== Quarter-finals ==
The first legs of the quarter-finals took place on 18 October, and the second legs took place on 25 October 2000.

=== First legs ===
18 October 2000	Dravograd	1–2	Rudar Velenje	Dravograd
15:30 CEST	Šteharnik 89'	Report	Lavrič 52', 55'	Stadium: Dravograd Sports Centre; Attendance: 400; Referee: Zoran Novarlič

18 October 2000	Gorica	6–1	Primorje	Nova Gorica
15:30 CEST	Gutalj 23', 54'; Pitamic 51'; Šnofl 68'; Reščič 71'; Žlogar 75'	Report	Starčevič 90'	Stadium: Sports Park; Attendance: 700; Referee: Srečko Kandare

18 October 2000	Elan	1–0	Jadran	Novo Mesto
15:30 CEST	Kršić 85'	Report		Stadium: Portoval; Attendance: 100; Referee: Emir Huselja

18 October 2000	Maribor	2–0	Olimpija	Maribor
18:00 CEST	N. Čeh 7'; Šarkezi 87'	Report		Stadium: Ljudski vrt Attendance: 4,500; Referee: Robert Krajnc

=== Second legs ===
25 October 2000	Primorje	0–1 (1–7 agg.)	Gorica	Ajdovščina
14:30 CEST		Report	Kovačevič 87'	Stadium: Ajdovščina City Stadium; Attendance: 700; Referee: Robert Šegula

25 October 2000	Jadran	1–1 (1–2 agg.)	Elan	Kozina
14:30 CEST	Malešević 9'	Report	B. Žagar 26' (pen.)	Stadium: Krvavi Potok Stadium; Attendance: 200; Referee: Gregor Ihan

25 October 2000	Rudar Velenje	2–1 (4–2 agg.)	Dravograd	Velenje
16:00 CEST	Jolič 56'; Spasojević 90+2'	Report	Rebol 69'	Stadium: Ob Jezeru; Attendance: 400; Referee: Matjaž Bohinc

25 October 2000	Olimpija	3–0 (3–2 agg.)	Maribor	Ljubljana
18:00 CEST	Cimirotič 12'; Škoro 15', 87'	Report		Stadium: Bežigrad Stadium; Attendance: 3,000; Referee: Darko Čeferin

== Semi-finals ==
The first legs of the semi-finals took place on 14 March, and the second legs took place on 4 April 2001.

=== First legs ===
14 March 2001	Gorica	3–1	Elan	Nova Gorica
15:15 CET	Gutalj 38', 57'; Žlogar 65'	Report	B. Žagar 87'	Stadium: Sports Park; Attendance: 500; Referee: Robert Zirnstein

14 March 2001	Rudar Velenje	0–2	Olimpija	Velenje
18:00 CET		Report	Cimirotič 13'; Jolič 18'	Stadium: Ob Jezeru; Attendance: 400; Referee: Peter Šart

=== Second legs ===
4 April 2001	Elan	2–2 (3–5 agg.)	Gorica	Novo Mesto
16:00 CEST	Majerle 52'; Perše 67'	Report	Šakiri 70' (pen.); Ipavec 74'	Stadium: Portoval; Attendance: 700; Referee: Milan Mitrovič

4 April 2001	Olimpija	4–1 (6–1 agg.)	Rudar Velenje	Ljubljana
18:00 CEST	Jolič 39', 42' (pen.); Jukić 73'; Kmetec 78'	Report	Bošković 45'	Stadium: Bežigrad Stadium; Attendance: 600; Referee: Robert Šegula

== Final ==
=== First leg ===
8 May 2001
18:00 CEST

Olimpija	1–0	Gorica
Cimirotič 20'	Report

Bežigrad Stadium, Ljubljana
Attendance: 3,500
Referee: Robert Krajnc

=== Second leg ===
17 May 2001
17:00 CEST

Gorica	4–2	Olimpija
Ipavec 45'; Žlogar 60'; Pitamic 67'; Šakiri 84' (pen.)	Report	Rakovič 82'; Ošlaj 89'

Nova Gorica Sports Park, Nova Gorica
Attendance: 1,200
Referee: Darko Čeferin

Gorica won 4–3 on aggregate.
