= Miha (given name) =

Miha is a Slovene masculine given name. Notable people with the name include:

- Miha Baloh (1928–2022), Slovene actor
- Miha Blažič, multiple Slovene individuals
- Miha Bregar (born 1993), Slovene volleyball player
- Miha Dovžan (born 1994), Slovene biathlete
- Miha Fontaine (born 2004) Canadian freestyle skier
- Miha Gale (born 1977), Slovene freestyle skier
- Miha Golob (born 1980), Slovene footballer
- Miha Goropevšek (born 1991), Slovene footballer
- Miha Gregorc (born 1979), Slovene tennis player
- Miha Gregorič (born 1989), Slovene footballer
- Miha Hrobat (born 1995), Slovene alpine ski racer
- Miha Ivanič (born 1998), Slovene badminton player
- Miha Kline (born 1980), Slovene footballer
- Miha Kokol (born 1989), Slovene footballer
- Miha Kompan Breznik (born 2003), Slovene footballer
- Miha Korošec (born 1991), Slovene footballer
- Miha Kralj (born 1949), Slovene musician
- Miha Krek (1897–1969), Slovene politician
- Miha Lapornik (born 1993), Slovene basketball player
- Miha Likar (1923–2010), Slovene biologist
- Miha Lokar (born 1935), Slovene basketball player
- Miha Marinko (1900–1983), Slovene politician
- Miha Mazzini (born 1961), Slovene writer and film director
- Miha Mevlja (born 1990), Slovene footballer
- Miha Novak (born 1987), Slovene footballer
- Miha Pirih (born 1978), Slovene rower
- Miha Remec (1928–2020), Slovene author
- Miha Rihtar (born 1981), Slovene ski jumper
- Miha Šimenc (born 1995), Slovene cross-country skier
- Miha Škedelj (born 1999), Slovene basketball player
- Miha Šporar (born 1972), Slovene footballer
- Miha Štebih (born 1992), Slovene ice hockey player
- Miha Štricelj (born 1974), Slovene slalom canoeist
- Miha Štrukelj (born 1973), Slovene artist
- Miha Terdič (born 1980), Slovene slalom canoeist
- Miha Tišler (1926–2021), Slovene chemist
- Miha Vašl (born 1992), Slovene basketball player
- Miha Verlič (born 1991), Slovene ice hockey player
- Miha Zajc (born 1994), Slovene footballer
- Miha Zarabec (born 1991), Slovene handball player
- Miha Zupan (born 1982), Slovene basketball player
- Miha Žvižej (born 1987), Slovene handball player
