= Kousal =

Kousal (feminine: Kousalová) is a Czech surname. Notable people with the surname include:

- Jakub Kousal (born 2002), Czech footballer
- Miloslav Kousal (born 1978), Czech footballer
- Robert Kousal (born 1990), Czech ice hockey player
