= Vitagliano =

Vitagliano is a surname. Notable people with the surname include:

- Gioacchino Vitagliano (1669–1739), Sicilian Baroque sculptor
- Juan Vitagliano, Argentine footballer
- Ottavia Vitagliano (1894–1975), Italian writer, editor, and publisher
- Benjamin "Benny the Baker" Vitagliano, (1890-1961), baker, mid-level Mafia boss, member of the Detroit Partnership

== See also ==
- Meanings of minor planet names: 5001–6000#368
