= Murko =

Murko is a Slovenian surname. It may refer to:

- Matija Murko (1861–1952), Slovenian scholar
- Mojca Drčar Murko (born 1942), Slovenian politician
- Peter Murko (born 1984), Slovenian football defender
- Tomaž Murko (born 1979), Slovenian football goalkeeper
