= Mladen Kovacevic =

Mladen Kovacevic may refer to:

- Mladen Kovačevič (born 1980), Slovenian retired footballer who played as a striker
- Mladen Kovačević (born 1994), Serbian footballer who plays as a forward
