= Radenko =

Radenko (Cyrillic script: Раденко) is a South Slavic masculine given name or East Slavic surname. It may refer to:

- Radenko Dobraš (born 1968), Serbian basketball player
- Radenko Kamberović (born 1983), Serbian footballer
- Radenko Kneževič (born 1979), footballer
- Radenko Mijatović (born 1963), Slovenian football administrator and former player
- Radenko Nedeljković, Kosovo Serb politician
- Radenko Pilčević (born 1986), Serbian basketball player
- Radenko Stanković (1880–1956), Serbian cardiologist and politician
- Radenko Varagić (born 1973), Serbian Dutch basketball coach
- Anatoliy Radenko (born 1959), Ukrainian footballer

== See also ==
- Radenkovac, village in Sokobanja municipality, Serbia
- Radenković, village in Sremska Mitrovica municipality, Serbia
