= Miha =

Miha may refer to:

- Miha (given name), a Slovene masculine given name
- Edmond Miha, Albanian football manager
