= Florijan Debenjak =

Slovenian footballer

Personal information
- Date of birth: 1 March 1969 (age 57)
- Height: 1.83 m (6 ft 0 in)
- Position: Defender

Senior career*
Years	Team	Apps	(Gls)
1987–2002	HIT Gorica	310	(33)

Managerial career
- 2002-2007: Gorica (asst.)
- 2011-2013: Gorica (asst.)
- 2017: Brda
- 2018-2020: Gorica (asst.)
- * Club domestic league appearances and goals

Florijan Debenjak (born 1 March 1969) is a retired Slovenian football defender and later manager.

== Career ==
Debenjak joined Gorica in 1987 and played 310 Slovenian league games for them, netting 33 times. He later became assistant to head coach Pavel Pinni at the club.

He succeeded Tonči Žlogar as manager of Brda in summer 2017.
