= Vladimir Kožul =

Serbian footballer

Vladimir Kožul Владимир Кожул
Personal information
- Full name: Vladimir Kožul
- Date of birth: 2 June 1975 (age 51)
- Place of birth: SR Serbia, SFR Yugoslavia
- Height: 6 ft 3 in (1.91 m)
- Position: Defender

Senior career*
Years	Team	Apps	(Gls)
1997–2001	Radnički Beograd		
2001–2003	Mura	59	(2)
2004	Maccabi Netanya	7	(0)
2005–2006	Nafta Lendava	21	(1)
2006	Dunaújváros	13	(1)

Managerial career
- 2012-2019: Čukarički (Youth)
- 2019-2023: Azerbaijan U21 (asst.)
- 2023-2024: Železničar Pančevo (asst.)
- 2024-2025: Jedinstvo Ub
- * Club domestic league appearances and goals

Vladimir Kožul (Serbian Cyrillic: Владимир Кожул; born 2 June 1975) is a Serbian retired footballer.

Kožul played as defender with NK Mura and NK Nafta Lendava in the Slovenian PrvaLiga, Maccabi Netanya in Israel, and Dunaújváros FC in Hungary.

== Honours ==
- Slovenian Second League Runner-up: 2004–05
