= Dejan Komljenović =

Slovenian footballer

Personal information
- Date of birth: 24 May 1984 (age 42)
- Place of birth: Velenje, SFR Yugoslavia
- Height: 1.81 m (5 ft 11 1/2 in)
- Position: Midfielder

Senior career*
Years	Team	Apps	(Gls)
2001–2004	Maribor	20	(2)
2005	Aluminij	8	(3)
2006	Rudar Velenje	10	(1)
2006–2007	Ritzing	22	(1)
2007–2009	Kastoria	17	(0)
2009–2010	Lokomotiv Plovdiv	10	(0)
2010–2011	Nafta Lendava	2	(1)
2011	Varaždin	1	(0)
2013	Tus Gross St. Florian	13	(3)
2014	SVU Sturm Klöch	11	(0)
2014–2017	Stojnci		
- * Club domestic league appearances and goals as of 15 January 2010

Dejan Komljenović (born 24 May 1984 in Velenje) is a Slovenian retired footballer. He is an attacking midfielder who has a great passing range.

== Career ==
Komljenović played for NK Rudar Velenje, NK Maribor, SC Ritzing and Kastoria, before moving to Bulgarian club Lokomotiv Plovdiv in 2009. He has since returned to Slovenia to play for NK Nafta Lendava.
