= Admir Malkić =

Croatian footballer

Personal information
- Date of birth: 28 June 1986 (age 40)
- Place of birth: Rijeka, SR Croatia, SFR Yugoslavia
- Height: 1.71 m (5 ft 7 in)
- Position: Midfielder

Youth career
- 2002-2004: Rijeka

Senior career*
Years	Team	Apps	(Gls)
2005	Halubjan Viškovo		
2005-2006	Svoboda Ljubljana	10	(3)
2006-2007	Orijent 1919		
2007	Rijeka	5	(0)
2007-2008	Pomorac 1921		
2008-2010	Istra 1961		
2009	→ Žminj (loan)		
2009-2010	→ Istra Pula (loan)		
2010-2013	Grobničan		
2013-2015	Al-Hussein SC		
2015-2017	Sohar SC		
2017	Dhofar Club		
2017	Al Urooba		
2018	Al-Nahda Club		
2018-2019	Al-Hussein SC		
2019-2021	Novigrad	15	(3)
2021	Grobničan		

International career^{‡}
2004	Croatia U18	1	(0)
- * Club domestic league appearances and goals as of 17 January 2021 ‡ National team caps and goals as of 17 January 2021

Admir Malkić (born 28 June 1986 in Croatia) is a Croatian footballer who is currently playing for NK Novigrad.

== Club career ==
Malkic started his senior career with NK Pomorac 1921. In 2007, he signed for HNK Rijeka in the Croatian First Football League, where he made over four appearances. After that, he played for Croatian clubs NK Istra 1961 and NK Grobničan, and Jordanian club Al-Hussein SC, and Omani clubs Sohar SC and Dhofar Club, and Emirati club Al Urooba, and Omani club Al-Nahda Club.
