= Gregor Zore =

Slovenian footballer

Personal information
- Full name: Gregor Zopre
- Date of birth: 3 August 1978 (age 48)
- Place of birth: SFR Yugoslavia
- Position: Midfielder

Senior career*
Years	Team	Apps	(Gls)
2000–2001	Domžale	3	(0)
2001–2005	Ljubljana	104	(17)
2005–2007	Nafta Lendava	45	(2)
2007–2008	Bela Krajina	19	(0)
2008	Krka	10	(0)
2009	Zagorje	2	(0)
2010-2012	Dobrova		
Total		183	(19)
- * Club domestic league appearances and goals

Gregor Zore (born 3 August 1978) is a Slovenian retired football player.
