= Blaž Brezovački =

Slovenian footballer

Personal information
- Full name: Blaž Brezovački
- Date of birth: 29 April 1987 (age 39)
- Place of birth: Ljubljana, SFR Yugoslavia
- Height: 1.83 m (6 ft 0 in)
- Position: Midfielder

Youth career
- –2004: Olimpija

Senior career*
Years	Team	Apps	(Gls)
2004	Olimpija	6	(0)
2004–2007	Benfica	0	(0)
2006–2007	→ Interblock (loan)	24	(0)
2007–2008	Livar	21	(2)
2008–2009	Nafta Lendava	29	(1)
2009–2012	Domžale	44	(2)
2012–2013	Aluminij	5	(0)
2013–2017	Poggersdorf	93	(9)

International career
2004	Slovenia U17	2	(0)
2006	Slovenia U20	1	(0)
2008	Slovenia U21	1	(0)
- * Club domestic league appearances and goals

Blaž Brezovački (born 29 April 1987) is a Slovenian football midfielder.

Brezovački played for Interblock and Livar and had a few seasons with Austrian 5th level side FC Poggersdorf.
