= Boris Mijatovič =

Slovenian footballer (born 1988)

Personal information
- Full name: Boris Mijatovič
- Date of birth: 7 February 1988 (age 38)
- Place of birth: Slovenj Gradec, SFR Yugoslavia
- Height: 1.88 m (6 ft 2 in)
- Position: Centre back

Youth career
- 1996–2006: NK Rudar Velenje

Senior career*
Years	Team	Apps	(Gls)
2006–2009	Rudar Velenje	43	(1)
2009–2010	Celje	27	(0)
2011–2012	Gorica	5	(0)
2012	FC Staad		
2013	Šmartno 1928	8	(0)
2013	UFC Wettmannstätten	10	(1)

International career
2008–2010	Slovenia U-21	10	(0)
- * Club domestic league appearances and goals as of 14:08, 2009-09-17 (UTC)

Boris Mijatovič (born 7 February 1988 in Yugoslavia) is a Slovenian footballer who ost recently played for Austrian lower league side UFC Wettmannstätten.

== Career ==
Mijatovič started his career at his hometown club NK Rudat Velenje at the age of 8. He rose through the ranks and made his league debut for the club in 2006 against NK Zagorje. Mijatovič made 39 league appearances and scored 1 goal for Rudar.

On 15 July 2009 he signed a 2-year contract with NK Celje. He moved to Swiss third tier-side FC Staad in 2012.

== Career statistics ==
As of 1 July 2009

Club performance			League		Cup		Continental		Total	
Season	Club	League	Apps	Goals	Apps	Goals	Apps	Goals	Apps	Goals
Slovenia			League		Cup		Continental		Total	
2006–07	Rudar	Druga liga	13	0	?	?	-		13	0
2007–08	Rudar	Druga liga	14	0	-		-		14	0
2008–09	Rudar	PrvaLiga	12	1	1	0	-		13	1
Total	Slovenia		39	1	1	0	-		40	1
Career total			39	1	1	0	-	-	40	1
