= Andrej Rastovac =

Slovenian footballer

Personal information
- Full name: Andrej Rastovac
- Date of birth: 24 June 1981 (age 45)
- Place of birth: Koper, Slovenia
- Height: 1.85 m (6 ft 1 in)
- Position: Defender

Senior career*
Years	Team	Apps	(Gls)
2000–2001	Altach	26	(0)
2001	Gorica	1	(0)
2002	Koper	4	(0)
2002–2003	Jadran Kozina	23	(1)
2003–2004	Koper	19	(2)
2004–2005	Koper, Primorje	30	(0)
2005–2006	Primorje	16	(0)
2006–2007	Bela Krajina	28	(0)
2007–2008	Koper	28	(3)
2008–2009	Koper	3	(0)
2008–2009	Farul Constanţa	21	(0)
2011–2014	White City Woodville	82	(6)
2015–2018	Adelaide Blue Eagles	72	(0)
2019–2021	Western Strikers	57	(2)
- * Club domestic league appearances and goals as of 4 November 2021

Andrej Rastovac (born 24 June 1981) is a Slovenian footballer currently under contract for Australian side Adelaide Blue Eagles from Adelaide.
