= Janez Pate =

Slovenian footballer and manager (born 1965)

Personal information
- Date of birth: 6 October 1965 (age 61)
- Place of birth: Ljubljana, SFR Yugoslavia
- Position: Midfielder

Senior career*
Years	Team	Apps	(Gls)
1982–1985	Olimpija	45	(6)
1988–1991	Olimpija	96	(26)
1992–1996	Pierikos		(34)
1996–1997	Alki Larnaca	0	(0)
1999–2000	Primorje	49	(9)
2001	Triglav Kranj	18	(6)
2001–2003	SAK Klagenfurt		
2003	DSG Ferlach		
2004	Kamnik	13	(5)
2004–2005	Zarica Kranj	23	(3)
2006–2007	Olimpija Ljubljana		

International career
1992–1994	Slovenia	6	(3)

Managerial career
- 2007–2009: Olimpija Ljubljana
- * Club domestic league appearances and goals

Janez "Jani" Pate (born 6 October 1965) is a Slovenian football manager and former player.

== International career ==
Pate made his debut for Slovenia in a November 1992 friendly match away against Cyprus and earned a total of 6 caps, scoring 3 goals. His final international was another friendly against Cyprus, in April 1994.

== Career statistics ==
=== International goals ===
#	Date	Venue	Opponent	Score	Result	Competition
1.	13 October 1993	Stanko Mlakar Stadium, Kranj, Slovenia	Macedonia	1–4	Loss	Friendly
2.	27 April 1994	Ljudski vrt, Maribor, Slovenia	Cyprus	3–0	Win	Friendly
3.	27 April 1994	Ljudski vrt, Maribor, Slovenia	Cyprus	3–0	Win	Friendly
Correct as of 13 January 2017
