= Enes Rujović =

Slovenian footballer

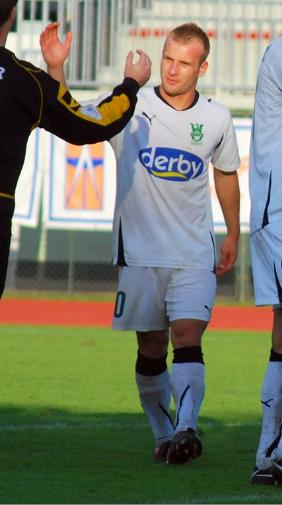

Personal information
- Full name: Enes Rujović
- Date of birth: 29 May 1989 (age 37)
- Place of birth: Ljubljana, SFR Yugoslavia
- Height: 1.70 m (5 ft 7 in)
- Position: Attacking midfielder

Team information
- Current team: SV Rohrbach/Lafnitz
- Number: 37

Youth career
- –2005: Olimpija
- 2005–2006: Svoboda
- 2006–2008: Interblock

Senior career*
Years	Team	Apps	(Gls)
2007–2009	Interblock	15	(0)
2008–2009	→ Ivančna Gorica (loan)	14	(5)
2009–2012	Olimpija Ljubljana	62	(6)
2011–2012	→ Triglav Kranj (loan)	0	(0)
2012	Krka	15	(8)
2013–2014	Nea Salamina	6	(1)
2014	Zakynthos	5	(0)
2015	Šenčur	12	(7)
2015	Krško	8	(1)
2015–2016	Šenčur	22	(7)
2016–2017	Drava	10	(0)
2017–2018	Ilirija 1911	50	(9)
2019	SV Stegersbach	15	(5)
2019–	SV Rohrbach/Lafnitz	87	(30)

International career
2007	Slovenia U18	8	(1)
2007	Slovenia U19	4	(0)
2010	Slovenia U20	1	(0)
2009–2010	Slovenia U21	3	(0)
- * Club domestic league appearances and goals as of 13 January 2024

Enes Rujović (born 29 May 1989) is a Slovenian football midfielder who plays for SV Rohrbach an der Lafnitz.

== Club career ==
Born in Ljubljana, he started his career in youth selections of Olimpija. He was later transferred to city rival Interblock, where he stayed for two seasons, playing 16 games. In the 2008–09 season, he was loaned to Livar, where he played 14 games and scored 5 goals. Before the 2009–10 season, he joined Olimpija Ljubljana.

== International career ==
He made his debut for Slovenia U21 in a friendly match against Bosnia and Herzegovina U21, which took place on 11 August 2009. He played in the second half of the match.
