= Anton Usnik =

Slovenian footballer (born 1973)

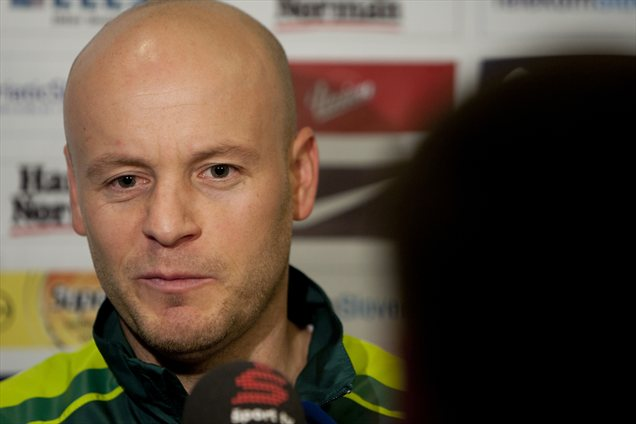

Personal information
- Date of birth: 17 September 1973 (age 53)
- Place of birth: Ljubljana, SFR Yugoslavia
- Height: 1.71 m (5 ft 7 in)
- Position: Attacking midfielder

Youth career
- Olimpija
- 1991–1994: 1. FC Kaiserslautern B

Senior career*
Years	Team	Apps	(Gls)
1991	Svoboda Ljubljana	6	(0)
1994	Ljubljana	9	(2)
1995–1996	Celje	35	(2)
1997–1998	Slavija Vevče	18	(2)
1998–1999	Domžale	25	(3)
2000	Korotan Prevalje	19	(3)
2000	Domžale	30	(9)
2001–2002	Ljubljana	6	(0)
2002	Šmartno ob Paki	8	(1)
2003	Leiftur/Dalvik	9	(1)
2004	Bela Krajina	8	(1)
2005–2006	Interblock	36	(2)

International career
1988–1991	Yugoslavia U15/U18	12	(0)
1994–1995	Slovenia U21	8	(1)

Managerial career
- 2006–2008: Interblock (assistant)
- 2008–2009: Interblock (scout)
- 2009–2010: Al-Arabi (assistant)
- 2011: Al-Nassr (assistant)
- 2011–2012: Slovenia (assistant)
- 2017–2018: Khooneh Be Khooneh (assistant)
- 2019–2020: Sanat Naft (assistant)
- 2020–2022: Iran (assistant)
- * Club domestic league appearances and goals

Anton "Toni" Usnik (born 17 September 1973) is a Slovenian football coach and former player who serves as assistant coach of the Iran national team under Dragan Skočić. He previously worked with Skočić at Interblock, Al-Arabi, Al-Nassr and Khooneh Be Khooneh. Between 2011 and 2012, served as the first assistant coach of the Slovenian national team under Slaviša Stojanovič. During his playing career, Usnik played professional in Slovenia, Germany and Iceland.

== Playing career ==
Usnik, who was an attacking midfielder, played club football in Slovenia for NK Svoboda Ljubljana, NK Ljubljana, NK Celje, NK Slavija Vevče, NK Domžale, NK Korotan Prevalje, NK Šmartno ob Paki, NK Bela Krajina, and NK Interblock. In Germany, he played for 1. FC Kaiserslautern B team, and in Iceland for Leiftur/Dalvik.
