= Boštjan Žnuderl =

Slovenian footballer

Personal information
- Date of birth: 17 January 1979 (age 47)
- Place of birth: SFR Yugoslavia
- Height: 1.73 m (5 ft 8 in)
- Position: Midfielder

Senior career*
Years	Team	Apps	(Gls)
1998–2000	Maribor	1	(0)
1999–2000	→ Železničar Maribor (loan)		
2000–2001	Celje	32	(6)
2001–2005	Maribor	93	(2)
2005–2006	Leibnitz Flavia Solva	30	(9)
2006–2010	SV Gleinstätten	124	(55)
2011	FC Kindberg	13	(6)
2011–2012	SV Frauental	25	(12)
2012	St. Peter im Sulmtal	13	(1)
2013	USV Wies	20	(23)
2014–2015	Dobrovce		

International career
- Slovenia U16
- Slovenia U18
- Slovenia U20
- Slovenia U21

Managerial career
- Jurovski Dol
- * Club domestic league appearances and goals

Boštjan Žnuderl (born 17 January 1979) is a retired Slovenian footballer who played as a midfielder. He played for Maribor and Celje in the Slovenian PrvaLiga, and also played for various clubs in the Austrian lower divisions.

== Honours ==
Maribor

- Slovenian First League: 1997–98, 2001–02, 2002–03
- Slovenian Cup: 2003–04
