= Matej Šnofl =

Slovenian footballer

Personal information
- Full name: Matej Šnofl
- Date of birth: 21 February 1977 (age 49)
- Place of birth: SFR Yugoslavia
- Height: 1.82 m (6 ft 0 in)
- Position: Defender

Senior career*
| Years | Team | Apps | (Gls) |
| 1995–1998 | Maribor | 13 | (1) |
| 1996–1997 | → Železničar Maribor (loan) | | |
| 1998–2000 | Dravograd | 40 | (0) |
| 2000–2001 | Gorica | 22 | (0) |
| 2001 | Maribor | 18 | (1) |
| 2002 | Olimpija Ljubljana | 13 | (0) |
| 2002–2003 | Koper | 13 | (0) |
| 2003–2006 | Celje | 99 | (2) |
| 2006–2009 | SVU Hollenegg | 87 | (3) |
| 2010–2011 | Grazer AK | 36 | (1) |
| 2011–2012 | SVU Hollenegg | 24 | (3) |
| 2012 | SV Strass | 4 | (0) |
| 2013–2019 | SV Tillmitsch | 153 | (25) |
| Total | | 522 | (36) |

International career
| 2001–2003 | Slovenia | 7 | (0) |
- * Club domestic league appearances and goals

Matej Šnofl (born 21 February 1977 in SFR Yugoslavia) is a Slovenian retired football defender.

During his club career, Šnofl played for Maribor, Dravograd, Gorica, Olimpija Ljubljana, Koper and Celje.

== International career ==
Šnofl made his debut for Slovenia in a February 2001 friendly match against Uruguay and earned a total of 7 caps, scoring no goals. His final international was an October 2003 European Championship qualification match away against Cyprus.
