= Tim Lo Duca =

Slovenian footballer (born 1985)

Personal information
- Date of birth: 17 December 1985 (age 40)
- Place of birth: Tolmin, SFR Yugoslavia
- Position: Forward

Youth career
- –2004: Bilje-Primorje

Senior career*
Years	Team	Apps	(Gls)
2003–2005	Primorje	31	(3)
2006–2008	Domžale	29	(2)
2006–2007	→ Ihan (loan)	7	(3)
2008	→ Livar (loan)	13	(4)
2008–2009	Nafta Lendava	36	(3)
2009	Rudar Velenje	17	(3)
2010	Domžale	3	(0)
2010–2011	Primorje	24	(3)
2011–2014	Tolmin	59	(32)
2015–2016	SV Gralla	37	(10)
2016–2018	SV Wolfsberg	48	(35)
2018–2020	USV Murfeld Süd	31	(12)
2020–2021	FC Erhart Preding	5	(0)
2021	Miklavž	0	(0)

International career
2004	Slovenia U19	1	(0)
2004–2005	Slovenia U20	6	(0)
2004–2006	Slovenia U21	6	(0)
- * Club domestic league appearances and goals

Tim Lo Duca (born 17 December 1985) is a Slovenian retired footballer who played as a forward.

== Career ==
Lo Duca began his senior career with Primorje in 2003. In February 2006, he was signed by Domžale. From January to June 2008, Lo Duca was loaned to Livar. In July 2009, he signed a contract with Rudar Velenje.
