= Goran Ristić =

Slovenian footballer

Personal information
- Date of birth: 25 February 1978 (age 48)
- Height: 1.76 m (5 ft 9 in)
- Position: Striker

Senior career*
Years	Team	Apps	(Gls)
1997–2001	Mura	112	(15)
2002–2005	Šmartno	72	(8)
2005–2007	Nafta Lendava	97	(18)
2007	SV Güssing		
2008	Zavrč	13	(5)
2008–2009	Mura 05	28	(4)
2010–2012	USV Neuhaus/Klausenbach	57	(40)
2013	SD Kobilje		
2013–2016	Čarda		
- * Club domestic league appearances and goals

Goran Ristić (born 25 February 1978) is a retired Slovenian football striker.
