= Tomaž Murko =

Slovenian footballer

Personal information
- Date of birth: 7 February 1979 (age 47)
- Place of birth: SFR Yugoslavia
- Height: 1.82 m (6 ft 0 in)
- Position: Goalkeeper

Youth career
- Kovinar Maribor
- Železničar Maribor

Senior career*
| Years | Team | Apps | (Gls) |
| 1995–2006 | Maribor | 130 | (0) |
| 2006–2009 | Drava Ptuj | 65 | (0) |
| 2009–2011 | Nafta Lendava | 51 | (0) |
| 2011–2015 | Aluminij | 112 | (0) |
| 2016–2018 | Gerečja vas | | |
| 2018–2020 | Majšperk | | |
| 2020 | Mladinec Lovrenc | | |
| 2020–2021 | Gerečja vas | | |

International career
| 1994–1995 | Slovenia U16 | 5 | (0) |
| 1997 | Slovenia U18 | 4 | (0) |
| 1997–1998 | Slovenia U20 | 2 | (0) |
| 2000–2001 | Slovenia U21 | 17 | (0) |
- * Club domestic league appearances and goals

Tomaž Murko (born 7 February 1979) is a Slovenian retired footballer who played as a goalkeeper.

He was a member of Maribor for most of his career, where he played in the 1990s and 2000s and made 130 league appearances. With the club, he won seven league titles and three national cups.

== Honours ==
Maribor

- Slovenian Championship: 1996–97, 1997–98, 1998–99, 1999–2000, 2000–01, 2001–02, 2002–03
- Slovenian Cup: 1996–97, 1998–99, 2003–04

Aluminij

- Slovenian Second League: 2010–11, 2011–12
