= Aleš Kokot =

Slovenian footballer (born 1979)

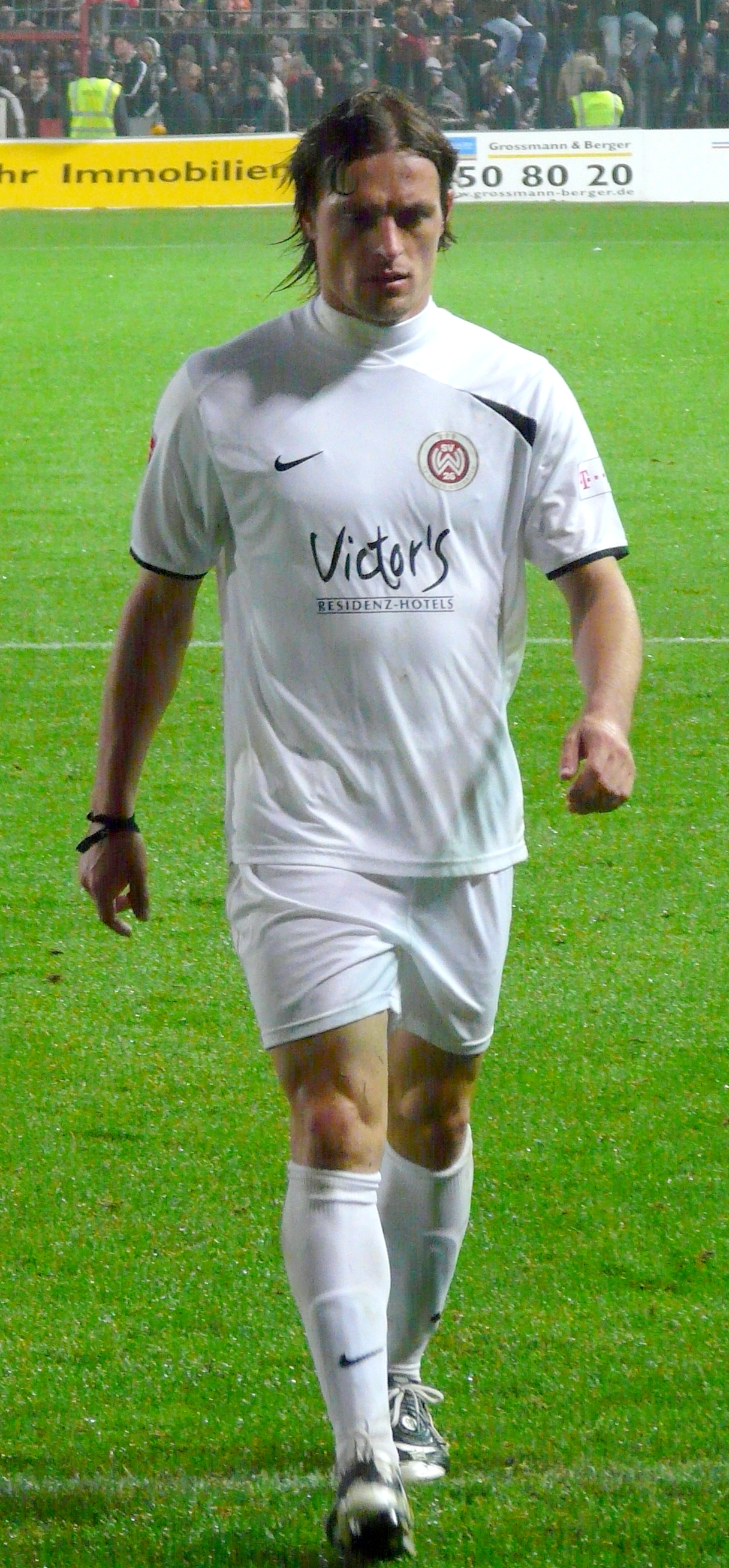

Personal information
- Full name: Aleš Kokot
- Date of birth: 23 October 1979 (age 47)
- Place of birth: Nova Gorica, SFR Yugoslavia
- Height: 1.77 m (5 ft 10 in)
- Position: Left-back

Youth career
- Gorica

Senior career*
Years	Team	Apps	(Gls)
1997–2005	Gorica	164	(6)
2005–2007	Greuther Fürth	39	(1)
2007–2009	SV Wehen	44	(1)
2009–2010	Interblock	13	(0)
2010	Kecskemét	4	(0)
2011-2012	Brda		
2012-2013	Bilje	5	(0)

International career
1998	Slovenia U20	2	(0)
2000–2001	Slovenia U21	10	(0)
2004–2008	Slovenia	10	(0)
- * Club domestic league appearances and goals

Aleš Kokot (born 23 October 1979) is a Slovenian retired football player.

== Club career ==
Born in Šempeter pri Gorici in western Slovenia, Kokot spent his childhood in the nearby town of Nova Gorica. He started his career at his home club Gorica. There he played eight seasons, winning Prva liga and Slovenian Cup two times before moving to German side SpVgg Greuther Fürth in 2005. Two years later he joined SV Wehen. After another two seasons in Second German league he joined Interblock Ljubljana on 23 June 2009. He was released by Interblock on 24 October 2009 and signed in February 2010 for Kecskeméti TE in Hungary.

== International career ==
Kokot made his debut for Slovenia in a February 2004 friendly match against Poland, coming on as a 65th-minute substitute for Amir Karić, and earned a total of 10 caps, scoring no goals. His final international was a February 2008 friendly against Denmark.

== Honours ==
=== Gorica ===
- Slovenian Championship: 2003–04, 2004–05
- Slovenian Cup: 2000–01, 2001–02
