= Damjan Ošlaj =

Slovenian footballer and manager

Personal information
- Date of birth: 25 August 1976 (age 50)
- Place of birth: SFR Yugoslavia
- Height: 1.84 m (6 ft 0 in)
- Position: Centre-back

Team information
- Current team: Śląsk Wrocław (assistant)

Senior career*
Years	Team	Apps	(Gls)
1994–2000	Mura	81	(3)
2000–2002	Olimpija	63	(5)
2002	Ljubljana	15	(0)
2003–2006	Maribor	71	(2)
2006–2010	Nafta Lendava	97	(6)
2010–2011	Olimpija Ljubljana	5	(0)
2011	Mura 05	20	(2)

International career
1994	Slovenia U18	2	(0)
1997	Slovenia U20	1	(0)
2003	Slovenia	1	(0)

Managerial career
- 2017: Mura
- 2022–2023: Ludogorets Razgrad (assistant)
- 2023–2024: Maribor (assistant)
- 2024–: Śląsk Wrocław (assistant)
- * Club domestic league appearances and goals

Damjan Ošlaj (born 25 August 1976) is a Slovenian professional football manager and former player who played as a defender. He currently serves as an assistant manager of Ekstraklasa club Śląsk Wrocław.

In 2003, Ošlaj made his only appearance for the Slovenia national team, away against Malta.
