= Aleš Šmon =

Slovenian footballer (born 1982)

Personal information
- Date of birth: 20 January 1982 (age 44)
- Place of birth: Yugoslavia
- Position: Midfielder

Senior career*
Years	Team	Apps	(Gls)
2001–2004	Rudar Velenje	58	(16)
2001	→ Pohorje (loan)	12	(2)
2002	→ Bistrica (loan)	12	(2)
2004–2005	SVG Bleiburg		
2005–2006	Drava Ptuj	9	(0)
2006–2007	Bonifika	23	(9)
2007–2008	Rudar Velenje	25	(3)
2008–2009	Koper	8	(0)
2009–2010	Dravinja	14	(1)
2011-2014	KMN Bronx	62	(39)
- * Club domestic league appearances and goals

Aleš Šmon (born 20 January 1982) is a Slovenian retired footballer who played as a midfielder.
