= Darko Karapetrović =

Slovenian footballer

Personal information
- Full name: Darko Karapetrović
- Date of birth: 17 March 1976 (age 50)
- Place of birth: Ljubljana, SFR Yugoslavia
- Height: 1.84 m (6 ft 0 in)
- Position: Midfielder

Senior career*
Years	Team	Apps	(Gls)
1993–1995	Olimpija	4	(0)
1997–1998	SET Vevče	30	(2)
1998–1999	Obilić	0	(0)
1998–1999	Radnički Niš	1	(0)
2000	Domžale	13	(1)
2000	Tabor Sežana	15	(2)
2001	Olimpija	12	(0)
2001–2004	Ljubljana	87	(17)
2005	SV Ried	11	(1)
2005–2006	SC Schwanenstadt	11	(0)
2006	Domžale	19	(1)
2007	Bela Krajina	14	(1)
2007–2008	Livar	18	(0)
2008	Krško	13	(3)
2009–2012	Radomlje	47	(9)
2012–2015	FC Poggersdorf	38	(4)

International career
1993	Slovenia U18	2	(0)
1993–1996	Slovenia U21	4	(0)

Managerial career
- 2013–2014: Olimpija Ljubljana (assistant)
- 2014–2015: Olimpija Ljubljana
- 2018: Interblock
- 2019: Brežice 1919
- 2019: Tabor Sežana (assistant)
- 2019–2020: Domžale (assistant)
- * Club domestic league appearances and goals

Darko Karapetrović (born 17 March 1976) is a retired Slovenian footballer and manager.

== Career ==
He started playing in Slovenia for Olimpija in the Slovenian PrvaLiga, where he also played for Slavija Vevče, Domžale, Tabor Sežana, Ljubljana, Bela Krajina and Livar. He also played in the First League of FR Yugoslavia in the 1998–99 season, for the previous year champions Obilić, and with Radnički Niš in the same season. He also played in the Austrian Erste Liga for SV Ried and SC Schwanenstadt, in 2005.

He has been playing in the Slovenian lower leagues for Krško and Radomlje.

He was part of the Slovenia national under-21 football team in the 1990s.

== Coaching career ==
Karapetrović left his manager position at NK Brežice 1919 in summer 2019 and was then immediately appointed assistant manager of Andrej Razdrh at NK Tabor Sežana. However, the duo left by mutual agreement on 4 September 2019. The following day, they were both hired by NK Domžale. The club fired both of them in June 2020.
