= Kozina =

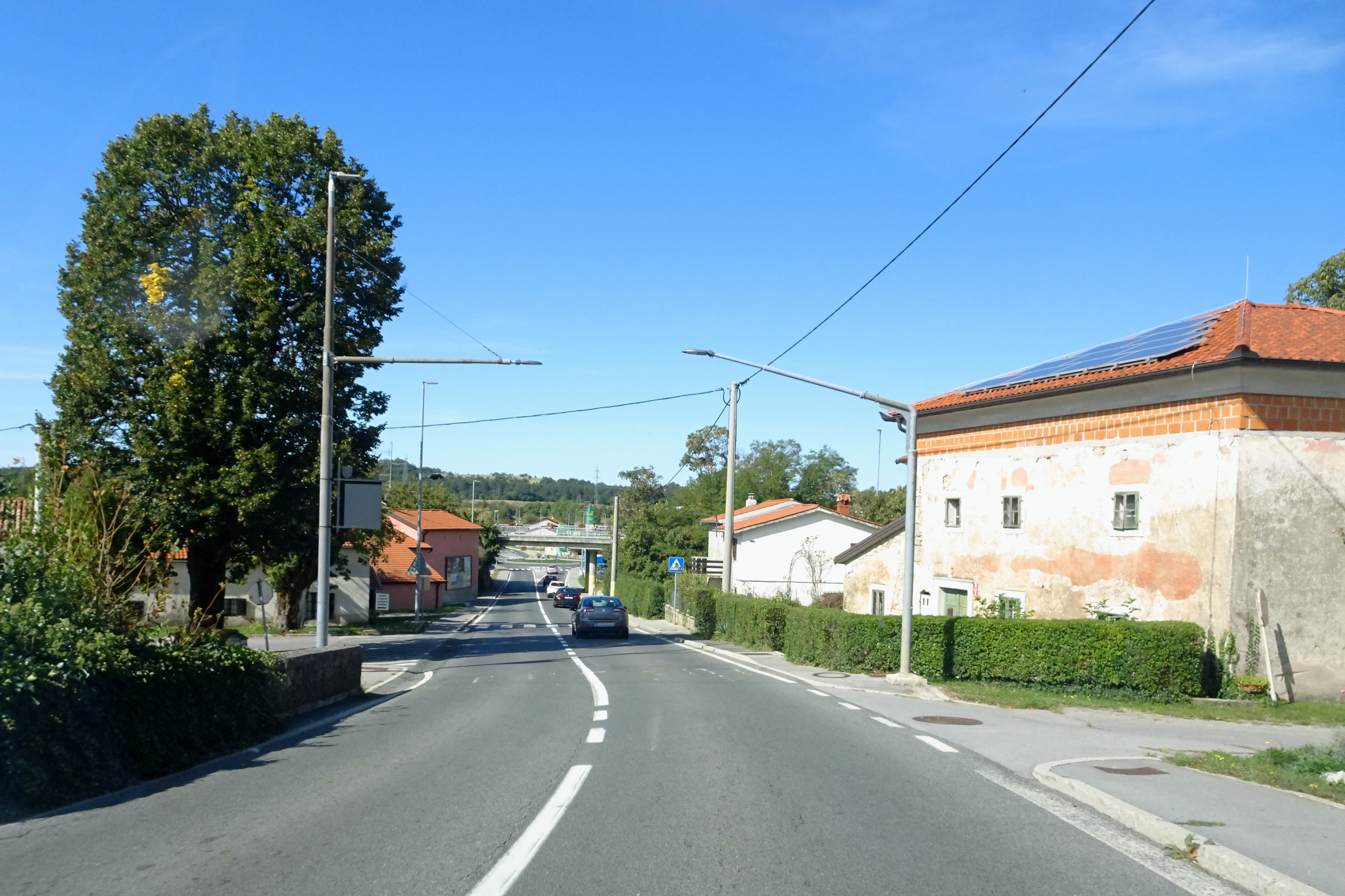

- Location in Slovenia
- Coordinates: 45°36′32.8″N 13°56′11.57″E
- Country: Slovenia
- Traditional region: Littoral
- Statistical region: Coastal–Karst
- Municipality: Hrpelje-Kozina

Area
  - Total: 2.96 km^{2} (1.14 sq mi)
- Elevation: 492.7 m (1,616 ft)

Population (2020)
  - Total: 664

Kozina (pronounced [kɔˈziːna]; Italian: Cosina) is a settlement in the Municipality of Hrpelje-Kozina in the Littoral region of Slovenia, close to the border with Italy.

The village developed only after the railway was established; in 1825 there were only three houses in Kozina. It became an important center for teamsters, with twelve inns with stalls for teamsters' horses. Today it lies at the intersection of the A1 motorway (Ljubljana–Koper) with Route 7 (Trieste–Rijeka).

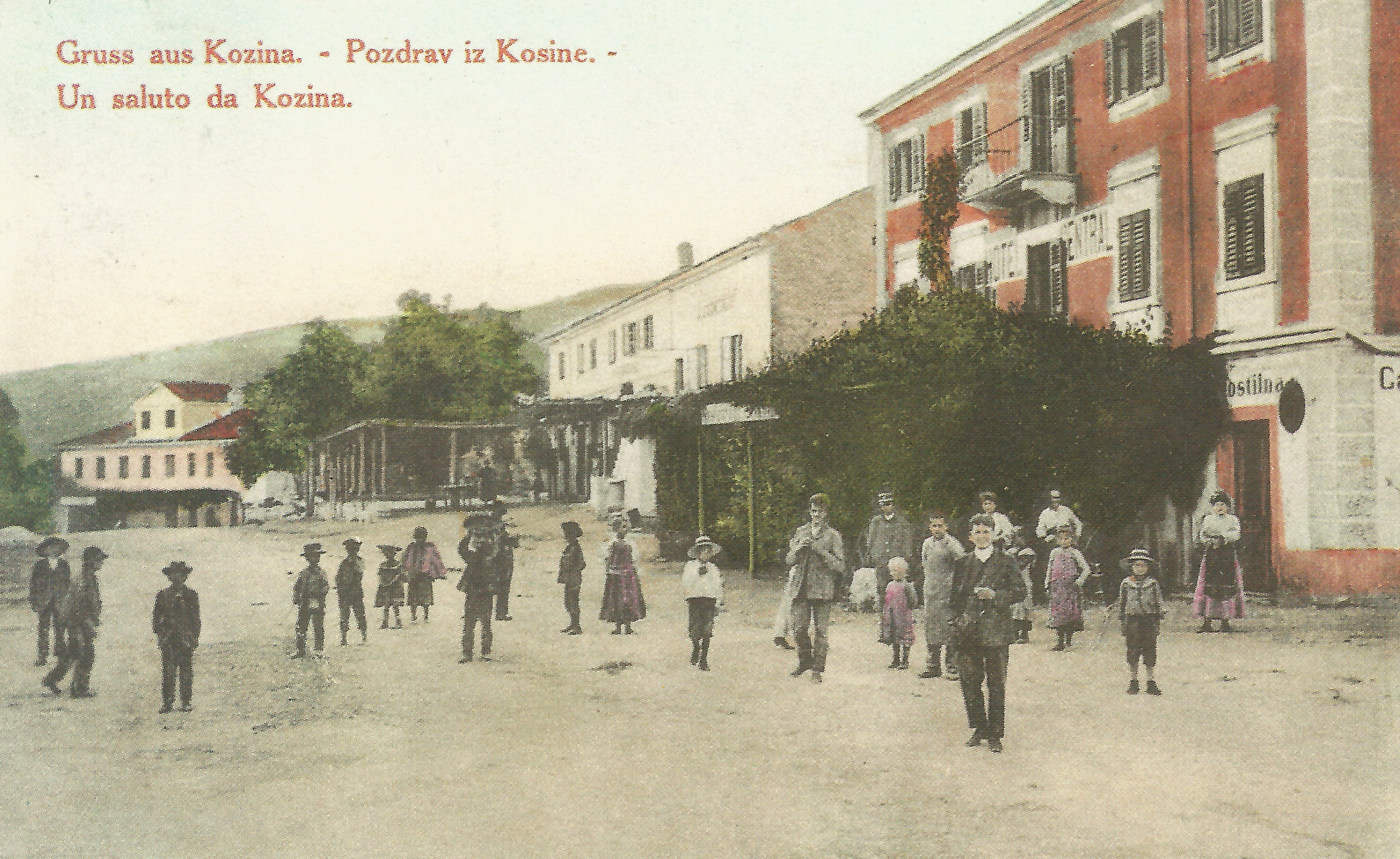
1908 postcard of Kozina
