= Miha Golob =

Slovenian footballer

Personal information
- Date of birth: 9 December 1980 (age 45)
- Place of birth: SFR Yugoslavia
- Height: 1.83 m (6 ft 0 in)
- Position: Midfielder

Senior career*
Years	Team	Apps	(Gls)
1999–2000	Rudar Velenje	53	(1)
2001	Dinamo Zagreb	0	(0)
2001–2005	Maribor	93	(2)
2005–2007	AEL Limassol	44	(0)
2007–2008	Aris Limassol	21	(0)
2008–2010	Rudar Velenje	54	(0)
2010–2012	SV Wildon	56	(2)
2012	TuS Kirchbach	10	(0)
2013	SV Wildon	11	(0)
2014–2018	USV Murfeld-Süd	119	(19)

International career
1997	Slovenia U16	3	(0)
1997	Slovenia U17	2	(0)
1998	Slovenia U18	5	(1)
1998–2000	Slovenia U20	4	(1)
2000–2001	Slovenia U21	11	(1)

Managerial career
- 2023–2024: Roho
- * Club domestic league appearances and goals

Miha Golob (born 9 December 1980) is a Slovenian retired footballer who played as a midfielder.

He played for Rudar Velenje, Dinamo Zagreb, Maribor, AEL Limassol, Aris Limassol, SV Wildon, TuS Kirchbach, and USV Murfeld-Süd.
