= Juan Vitagliano =

Argentine footballer

Personal information
- Full name: Juan Sebastian Cruz Vitagliano
- Date of birth: 5 June 1980 (age 46)
- Place of birth: Argentina
- Position: Midfielder

Senior career*
Years	Team	Apps	(Gls)
-2000	F.S. Sestrese Calcio 1919		
2000-2001	A.C. Fidenza 1922		
2001-2003/04	FC Koper	58	(5)
2003/2004	A.S.D.C. Pomigliano		
2004/2005	FC Koper	14	(0)
2004/2005	NK Olimpija Ljubljana	13	(0)
2005-2006	Associazione Calcio Cologna Veneta		
2006-2007	A.C. Trento S.C.S.D.		
2007/2008	A.C. Castellana Calcio		
2008-2009	FC Koper	35	(2)
2012/2013	A.D.C. Ars et Labor Grottaglie		
2013/14-2016/17	Thermal Teolo Academy		
- * Club domestic league appearances and goals

Juan Sebastian Cruz Vitagliano (born 5 June 1980 in Argentina) is an Argentinean retired footballer.

== Career ==
At the age of 19, Vitagliano moved to Italy, where he played in the lower divisions before signing with Slovenian side Koper in 2001.

In 2004/05, he played for NK Olimpija Ljubljana. However, the club was dissolved at the end of 2005 due to financial problems.

Vitagliano has compared his style of play to that of Argentina international Matías Almeyda.
