= Miloslav Kousal =

Czech footballer

Personal information
- Date of birth: 29 October 1978 (age 48)
- Place of birth: Czechoslovakia
- Height: 1.88 m (6 ft 2 in)
- Position: Forward

Youth career
- 1983–1992: FK Harrachov
- 1993–1997: FK Jablonec 97

Senior career*
Years	Team	Apps	(Gls)
1997–1998	Český Dub		
1998	SK Semily		
1999–2001	Sebat Velké Hamry		
2001–2002	Publikum Celje	14	(1)
2002–2003	Viktoria Plzeň	50	(11)
2003	Hapoel Kiryat Shmona		
2004–2006	Viktoria Plzeň		
2006–2008	SK Kladno		
2008–2009	Vllaznia Shkodër		
2010	AO Ayia Napa		
2011–2012	Germania Schöneiche	28	(21)
2012–2013	VFC Plauen	12	(3)
2013	BFC Dynamo	14	(1)
- * Club domestic league appearances and goals as of 30 June 2013

Miloslav Kousal (born 29 October 1978) is a Czech former football striker.

During his career he played for Czech clubs FC Viktoria Plzeň and SK Kladno in the Czech First League, Slovenian Publikum Celje, Israeli Hapoel Kiryat Shmona F.C., Albanian KS Vllaznia Shkodër and Cypriot Ayia Napa FC.
