= Rusmin Dedić =

Slovenian footballer

Personal information
- Full name: Rusmin Dedić
- Date of birth: 11 September 1982 (age 44)
- Place of birth: Zvornik, SFR Yugoslavia
- Position: Defender

Senior career*
Years	Team	Apps	(Gls)
2001–2003	Rudar Velenje	41	(0)
2003–2004	Vorskla Poltava	20	(0)
2004–2005	Olimpija	11	(1)
2005–2006	Rudar Velenje	14	(0)
2006–2008	HIT Gorica	50	(0)
2008–2015	Rudar Velenje	124	(2)
Total		260	(3)
- * Club domestic league appearances and goals

Rusmin Dedić (born 11 September 1982) is a Slovenian retired footballer who played as a defender.

== Doping case ==
His Ukrainian club Vorskla Poltava got docked three points in 2003 after Dedić was caught for using a banned substance. The player himself was banned for 6 months.
