= Miha Novak =

Slovenian footballer

Personal information
- Full name: Mihael Novak
- Date of birth: 24 March 1987 (age 39)
- Place of birth: Kranj, Slovenia
- Height: 1.81 m (5 ft 11 in)
- Position: Midfielder

Youth career
- 1993–2004: Triglav Kranj

Senior career*
Years	Team	Apps	(Gls)
2004–2008	Triglav Kranj	53	(6)
2008–2009	Domžale	13	(0)
2009–2010	Triglav Kranj	15	(1)
2011–2012	Šenčur	28	(4)
2015–2016	Ivančna Gorica	14	(1)
- * Club domestic league appearances and goals as of 22:39, 23 May 2009 (UTC)

Miha Novak (born 24 March 1987) is a Slovenian football midfielder.
