= Miha Kline =

Slovenian footballer

Personal information
- Date of birth: 26 March 1980 (age 46)
- Place of birth: Ljubljana, SFR Yugoslavia
- Height: 1.74 m (5 ft 9 in)
- Position: Midfielder

Youth career
- Svoboda

Senior career*
Years	Team	Apps	(Gls)
2001–2003	Ljubljana	37	(3)
2003–2004	Dravograd	25	(6)
2004–2006	Domžale	45	(1)
2006	Shinnik Yaroslavl	26	(0)
2007	Dinaburg Daugavpils	0	(0)
2007–2008	Veria	7	(0)
2009–2011	Svoboda	14	(7)
- * Club domestic league appearances and goals

Miha Kline (born 26 March 1980) is a Slovenian former football midfielder.

He has previously played for Shinnik Yaroslavl in the Russian Premier League, Dinaburg in the Latvian League and Domžale in the Slovenian PrvaLiga.
