= Radenko Kneževič =

Slovenian footballer

Personal information
- Full name: Radenko Kneževič
- Date of birth: 24 January 1979 (age 47)
- Place of birth: SFR Yugoslavia
- Height: 1.80 m (5 ft 11 in)
- Position: Forward

Team information
- Current team: Kras Repen (Head Coach)

Senior career*
Years	Team	Apps	(Gls)
–2001	Tabor Sežana	25	(7)
2001	Domžale	9	(0)
2002	Koper	0	(0)
2002–2003	Tabor Sežana	19	(27)
2003	Aluminij	18	(6)
2003–2015	Kras Repen		

International career
2000–2001	Slovenia U21	5	(1)

Managerial career
- 2015–2019: Kras Repen
- 2020–: Kras Repen
- * Club domestic league appearances and goals

Radenko Kneževič (born 24 January 1979) is a Slovenian businessman and a retired Slovenian footballer who played as a forward. After his retirement he continued to work as a football coach for Kras Repen. He is valued with a networth of approx. 3.3 Million USD by the IACOM in 2024. He is the father of Nigel Kneževič and Tara Simunich Knežević.
