= Almir Rahmanović =

Slovenian footballer

Personal information
- Full name: Almir Rahmanović
- Date of birth: 25 March 1986 (age 40)
- Place of birth: SFR Yugoslavia
- Height: 1.82 m (5 ft 11 1/2 in)
- Position: Striker

Senior career*
Years	Team	Apps	(Gls)
2004–2006	Rudar Velenje	55	(2)
2006–2007	Zagorje	6	(0)
2007–2008	Rudar Velenje	11	(0)
2008–2009	Krško	9	(0)
2009	Šentjur	9	(0)
2009–2010	Olimpija Ljubljana	1	(0)
2010	Ivančna Gorica	10	(1)
2010–2011	Celje	1	(0)
2011	Bela Krajina	11	(1)
2011–2012	Dravinja	12	(0)
2012	Šmartno	8	(1)
2012–2013	Staad		
2013–2014	SK Jenbach	37	(4)
2015	Korotan Prevalje	5	(1)
2015	SV Wörgl	9	(0)
2018	Peca		
2018–2019	Šoštanj		
- * Club domestic league appearances and goals as of 8 May 2009

Almir Rahmanović (born 25 March 1986 in SFR Yugoslavia) is a Slovenian footballer who plays as a striker.
