= Darko Djukić =

Slovenian footballer

Personal information
- Full name: Darko Djukić
- Date of birth: 13 August 1980 (age 46)
- Place of birth: Ljubljana, SFR Yugoslavia
- Height: 1.83 m (6 ft 0 in)
- Position: Striker

Team information
- Current team: SAK Klagenfurt (manager)

Senior career*
Years	Team	Apps	(Gls)
2000–2001	Domžale	9	(0)
2001	Ljubljana	13	(11)
2002–2003	Maribor	14	(3)
2003	Ljubljana	17	(2)
2004	Maribor	6	(0)
2005	Koper	15	(13)
2005	Hapoel Nazareth Illit	20	(5)
2005	Bnei Sakhnin	3	(0)
2006	Hapoel Be'er Sheva		
2006–2007	Domžale	26	(6)
2007	Gorica	13	(0)
2008–2009	Koper	34	(9)
2009	Rudar Velenje	2	(0)
2009	Flamurtari Vlorë	14	(1)
2010–2012	Villacher SV	61	(26)
2012–2015	ATUS Ferlach	82	(27)
2015–2018	DSG Sele/Zell	19	(3)
2018–2019	St. Margareten	8	(1)
2019–2022	DSG Sele/Zell	11	(3)

Managerial career
- 2023-: SAK Klagenfurt
- * Club domestic league appearances and goals

Darko Djukić (born 13 August 1980 in Ljubljana) is a Slovenian footballer who is currently manager at SAK Klagenfurt.

== Career ==
After establishing himself in his native Slovenia, Djukič signed with Israeli club Hapoel Nazareth Illit of the Israeli Premier League. He had a tough time acclimating to the club's style of play and was transferred to Bnei Sakhnin as a result. The clubs in Israel understood Djukič's reputation from Slovenia so regardless of the fact that he had yet to score in the country, he was transferred to Hapoel Be'er Sheva during the January transfer window. Be'er Sheva locked up the Slovenian striker just before he was set to agree terms with Hapoel Ra'anana.
