= Mladen Kovačevič =

Slovenian footballer

Personal information
- Full name: Mladen Kovačevič
- Date of birth: 3 May 1980 (age 46)
- Place of birth: SFR Yugoslavia
- Height: 1.79 m (5 ft 10 1/2 in)
- Position: Striker

Youth career
- –1999: Gorica

Senior career*
Years	Team	Apps	(Gls)
1999–2009	Gorica	150	(36)
2010–2014	Adria		
- * Club domestic league appearances and goals

Mladen Kovačevič (born 3 May 1980) is a Slovenian retired football player, who played as a striker. He played 10 seasons with Gorica. He scored 36 goals in 150 appearances in the Slovenian first division.
