= Darko Kremenović =

Slovenian footballer

Personal information
- Date of birth: 5 June 1981 (age 45)
- Height: 1.78 m (5 ft 10 in)
- Position: Forward

Team information
- Current team: Svoboda Ljubljana

Senior career*
Years	Team	Apps	(Gls)
2001–2003	Gorica	43	(4)
2003	→ Goriška Brda (loan)	15	(7)
2003–2006	Koper	83	(18)
2007	Henan Jianye		
2007	Livar	18	(6)
2008	Bonifika	8	(1)
2008–2009	FC Kärnten	12	(1)
2009	Zagorje	5	(2)
2009	Mura 05	13	(7)
2010–2011	Primorje	23	(15)
2011	Zhetysu	6	(0)
2011–2012	ASD Lumignacco		
2012–2013	Izola	30	(15)
2014	TSV Neumarkt	8	(7)
2014	Izola	10	(15)
2015	SV Dellach/Gail	14	(6)
- FC Villeneuve Sports
2022–2025	Izola	44	(22)
2026–	Svoboda Ljubljana	8	(1)

International career
2000	Slovenia U20	2	(0)
- * Club domestic league appearances and goals as of 28 October 2026

Darko Kremenović (born 5 June 1981) is a Slovenian footballer who plays for Svoboda Ljubljana as a forward.

== Career ==
=== China ===
Kremenović joined Henan Jianye in February 2007. He was described as displaying the qualities of an archetypal European professional footballer. However, he performed mediocrely in the first two rounds, and was then benched for a series of matches.

=== Kazakhstan ===
Preparing with Zhetysu partway through January 2011, Kremenović made six league appearances for the team, but never made it into the main lineup. His contract expired that summer.
