= Alem Mujaković =

Slovenian footballer

Personal information
- Date of birth: 6 April 1978 (age 48)
- Place of birth: SFR Yugoslavia
- Height: 1.80 m (5 ft 11 in)
- Positions: Midfielder; centre-forward

Senior career*
Years	Team	Apps	(Gls)
1996–1998	Rudar Velenje	3	(0)
2000–2002	Šmartno ob Paki	56	(5)
2002–2010	Rudar Velenje	219	(25)
2011–2012	Šmartno 1928	24	(3)
Total		302	(33)
- * Club domestic league appearances and goals

Alem Mujaković (born 6 April 1978) is a Slovenian former professional footballer who played as a midfielder or centre-forward. He spent the majority of his career with Rudar Velenje in the Slovenian PrvaLiga, where he became a regular first-team player throughout the 2000s.

== Career ==
Mujaković began his professional career at NK Rudar Velenje in 1996, making three league appearances before moving to Šmartno in 2000. He played two seasons with the club, recording 56 caps and 5 goals.

In 2002, he returned to Rudar Velenje, where he established himself as a key player for eight seasons, amassing over 200 appearances and scoring 25 goals.

Toward the end of his career, he signed with NK Šmartno 1928 in the Slovenian Second League, adding another 24 appearances and 3 goals before retiring in 2012.

Primarily deployed as a central midfielder, Mujaković was also capable of playing in a more advanced role as a centre-forward.

== Career statistics ==
Club	Season	League	Apps	Goals
Rudar Velenje	1996–1998	PrvaLiga	3	0
Šmartno ob Paki	2000–2002	PrvaLiga	56	5
Rudar Velenje	2002–2010	PrvaLiga	219	25
Šmartno 1928	2011–2012	Slovenian Second League	24	3
Career total			302	33
