= Anton Žlogar =

Slovenian footballer and manager (born 1977)

Personal information
- Date of birth: 24 November 1977 (age 48)
- Place of birth: Izola, SFR Yugoslavia
- Height: 1.90 m (6 ft 3 in)
- Position: Defensive midfielder

Team information
- Current team: Primorje (head coach)

Youth career
- Izola

Senior career*
| Years | Team | Apps | (Gls) |
| 1993–1996 | Izola | 39 | (0) |
| 1996–1998 | Primorje | 66 | (24) |
| 1998–2001 | Gorica | 95 | (32) |
| 2001–2004 | Olimpija | 99 | (33) |
| 2004–2006 | EN Paralimni | 37 | (9) |
| 2006–2008 | Anorthosis Famagusta | 55 | (14) |
| 2008–2010 | Omonia Nicosia | 49 | (8) |
| 2010–2011 | Alki Larnaca | 23 | (0) |
| 2011–2013 | Pordenone | 32 | (4) |
| 2013–2014 | Kras Repen | | |

International career
| 1995 | Slovenia U18 | 2 | (0) |
| 1997 | Slovenia U20 | 2 | (0) |
| 1996–1999 | Slovenia U21 | 17 | (1) |
| 1998–2009 | Slovenia | 37 | (1) |
| 2003 | Slovenia B | 2 | (0) |

Managerial career
- 2014–2016: Kras Repen
- 2016–2017: Brda
- 2017: Triglav Kranj
- 2017–2018: Brda
- 2019: Slovenia U16
- 2019: Slovenia U17
- 2021: Slovenia U16/U18
- 2022–2024: Slovenia U18/U19
- 2024: Mura
- 2025: Domžale
- 2025–2026: Domžale
- 2026–: Primorje
- * Club domestic league appearances and goals

Anton Žlogar (born 24 November 1977) is a retired Slovenian footballer who played as a midfielder. Since March 2026, he has been the head coach of Primorje.

== International career ==
Žlogar made his debut for Slovenia on 25 March 1998 against Poland and earned a total of 37 caps, scoring 1 goal. With Slovenia, he participated at Euro 2000.

== Coaching career ==
On 25 November 2014, Žlogar took charge at Italian club Kras, where he stayed until 2016. In June 2017, he took charge of Triglav Kranj.

== Honours ==
Gorica

- Slovenian Cup: 2000–01

Olimpija

- Slovenian Cup: 2002–03

Anorthosis Famagusta

- Cypriot First Division: 2007–08
- Cypriot Cup: 2006–07
- Cyprus Super Cup: 2007

Omonia

- Cypriot First Division: 2009–10
