= Aleš Puš =

Slovenian footballer

Personal information
- Full name: Aleš Puš
- Date of birth: 2 August 1979 (age 47)
- Place of birth: Slovenia
- Position: Defender

Senior career*
Years	Team	Apps	(Gls)
1998–2000	Olimpija	0	(0)
2000–2001	Ivančna Gorica	15	(2)
2001–2006	HIT Gorica	142	(3)
2006–2007	Koper	22	(1)
2007–2008	Ethnikos Achna	7	(0)
2008–2009	Celje	5	(0)
2009–2014	Adria		
- * Club domestic league appearances and goals as of 22:10, 12 March 2009 (UTC)

Aleš Puš (born 2 August 1979) is a Slovenian retired football defender.

He has played for Olimpija, Gorica, Luka Koper and Celje.
