= Milan Rakič =

Slovenian footballer

Milan Rakić
Personal information
- Full name: Milan Rakić
- Date of birth: 2 September 1981 (age 45)
- Place of birth: Novi Sad, SFR Yugoslavia
- Height: 1.82 m (5 ft 11 1/2 in)
- Position: Attacking midfielder

Senior career*
Years	Team	Apps	(Gls)
1998–2000	Novi Sad	17	(2)
2001–2003	Aluminij	59	(17)
2003–2007	Maribor	83	(12)
2007–2008	Koper	10	(0)
2008–2009	Mogren	20	(0)
2009	Kecskemét	4	(1)
2010	Smederevo	8	(0)
2010–2011	Novi Sad	5	(1)

International career
2005	Slovenia	1	(0)
- * Club domestic league appearances and goals

Milan Rakić (Serbian Cyrillic: Милан Ракић; born 9 February 1981) is a Serbia-born Slovenian retired footballer.

== Club career ==
Born in Novi Sad, SR Serbia, he began his career in 1998 at the Serbian club RFK Novi Sad. In 2001, he moved to Slovenia where, after playing two seasons for Aluminij, he signed for one of the most successful clubs, NK Maribor. He also played for another Slovenian club FC Koper and for Montenegrin First League club Mogren Budva before, in summer 2009, he moved to Hungary to play with Kecskeméti TE until January 2010 when he returned to Serbia and signed with SuperLiga side FK Smederevo. Since summer 2010 he has returned to FK Novi Sad playing then in the Serbian First League.

== International career ==
In 2005, he made his only appearance for the Slovenia national football team, in a friendly match against the Czech Republic.

== Honours ==
Maribor

- Slovenian Football Cup: 2003–04

Mogren

- Montenegrin First League: 2008–09
