= Saša Ranić =

Slovenian footballer

Personal information
- Date of birth: 7 November 1981 (age 44)
- Place of birth: Šempeter pri Gorici, SFR Yugoslavia
- Height: 1.82 m (6 ft 0 in)
- Position: Midfielder

Senior career*
Years	Team	Apps	(Gls)
2000–2003	Primorje	26	(2)
2002	→ Bilje (loan)	1	(0)
2003–2006	Gorica	105	(27)
2007	Chiasso	14	(0)
2007–2010	Veria	26	(4)
2008	→ Kerkyra (loan)	22	(6)
2011–2012	Olimpija Ljubljana	20	(0)
2012–2013	Panserraikos	26	(2)
2013–2014	Krka	25	(1)
2014–2015	Kras Repen	17	(3)
2015	Nuorese	11	(0)
2015–2017	Manzanese		
2017–2018	Adria	20	(4)

International career
2006	Slovenia B	2	(0)

Managerial career
- 2025: Gorica
- * Club domestic league appearances and goals

Saša Ranić (born 7 November 1981) is a Slovenian retired footballer who played as a midfielder.
