= 1996–97 Slovenian Football Cup =

Tournament details
- Country: Slovenia
- Teams: 32

Final positions
- Champions: Maribor (3rd title)
- Runners-up: Primorje

Tournament statistics
- Matches played: 38
- Goals scored: 151 (3.97 per match)

The 1996–97 Slovenian Football Cup was the sixth season of the Slovenian Football Cup, Slovenia's football knockout competition.

== Qualified clubs ==
=== 1995–96 Slovenian PrvaLiga members ===
- Beltinci
- Celje
- Gorica
- Izola
- Korotan Prevalje
- Maribor
- Mura
- Olimpija
- Primorje
- Rudar Velenje

=== Qualified through MNZ Regional Cups ===
- MNZ Ljubljana: Ljubljana, Vevče, Mengeš
- MNZ Maribor: Železničar Maribor, Akumulator, Kovinar Maribor
- MNZ Celje: Šentjur, Šmartno
- MNZ Koper: Jadran, Ankaran
- MNZ Nova Gorica: Renče, Komen
- MNZ Murska Sobota: Veržej, Bakovci, Goričanka
- MNZ Lendava: Nafta Lendava, Odranci
- MNZG-Kranj: Triglav Kranj, Naklo
- MNZ Ptuj: Drava Ptuj, Aluminij, Središče

== First round ==
The first round matches took place between 28 July and 11 August 1996.

Team 1	Score	Team 2
Beltinci	1–3	Olimpija
Akumulator	0–13	Gorica
Veržej	1–7	Mura
Mengeš	0–5	Maribor
Aluminij	3–3 (a.e.t.) (4–3 p)	Ljubljana
Goriške Opekarne	1–4	Rudar Velenje
Goričanka	1–7	Primorje
Jadran	1–2	Korotan Prevalje
Vevče	1–7	Celje
Naklo	1–0	Triglav Kranj
Izola	0–3 (w/o)	Odranci
Bakovci	1–2	Železničar Maribor
Nafta Lendava	4–0	Ankaran
Šentjur	2–0	Kovinar Maribor
Komen	1–4	Drava Ptuj
Središče	0–6	Šmartno

== Round of 16 ==
The round of 16 matches took place on 18 September 1996.

18 September 1996	Šentjur	1–2	Celje	Šentjur
	Kačičnik 60'		Goršek 45'; Sivko 79'	Stadium: Šentjur Sports Park; Attendance: 800; Referee: Dževad Salkič

18 September 1996	Rudar Velenje	3–3 (a.e.t.) (3–4 p)	Maribor	Velenje
	Vidovič 26', 78'; Ratkovič 49'		Šimundža 4'; Kek 16' (pen.), 72'	Stadium: Ob Jezeru City Stadium; Attendance: 700; Referee: Žarko Hvalič
	Penalties
	Ekmečić (penalty scored); Žilnik (penalty scored); Vidovič (penalty scored)		(penalty scored) Fricelj; (penalty scored) Kek; (penalty scored) Šimundža; (penalty scored) Karić

18 September 1996	Gorica	1–3	Mura	Nova Gorica
	Osterc 86'		Dominko 40'; Škaper 82'; Kmetec 90'	Stadium: Nova Gorica Sports Park; Attendance: 1,200; Referee: Darko Horvat

18 September 1996	Naklo	1–5	Olimpija	Naklo
	Razdrh 60' (pen.)		Kitić 4'; Cimirotič 46', 60'; Valentić 60'; Ačimovič 69'	Stadium: Naklo Sports Field; Attendance: 200; Referee: Robert Zirnstein

18 September 1996	Železničar Maribor	1–3 (a.e.t.)	Korotan Prevalje	Maribor
	Pipenbaher 68'		Nikčević 10', 112'; Grizold 118'	Stadium: Tabor Sports Park; Attendance: 200; Referee: Andrej Kokolj

18 September 1996	Šmartno	5–2	Odranci	Šmartno ob Paki
	Štefančič 20'; Marinček 37'; Smajlović 58', 76'; Stojko 67'		Radikovič 45'; Kerčmar 63'	Stadium: Šmartno Stadium; Attendance: 150; Referee: Matjaž Bohinc

18 September 1996	Aluminij	3–1	Drava Ptuj	Kidričevo
	R. Hojnik 2', 78'; Fridl 8'		Volk 45'	Stadium: Aluminij Sports Park; Attendance: 1,200; Referee: Željko Lackovič

18 September 1996	Nafta	0–1 (a.e.t.)	Primorje	Lendava
			Žlogar 104'	Stadium: NK Nafta Stadium; Attendance: 400; Referee: Josip Jakopiček

== Quarter-finals ==
The first legs of the quarter-finals took place on 23 October, and the second legs took place on 20 November 1996.

=== First legs ===
23 October 1996	Olimpija	1–0	Celje	Ljubljana
	Zulič 47'			Stadium: Bežigrad Stadium; Attendance: 250; Referee: Žarko Vidali

23 October 1996	Mura	1–0	Šmartno	Murska Sobota
	Kmetec 52'			Stadium: Fazanerija City Stadium; Attendance: 600; Referee: Željko Lackovič

23 October 1996	Maribor	3–1	Korotan Prevalje	Maribor
	Židan 45'; Kollari 71'; Milinovič 89'		Podvinski 15'	Stadium: Ljudski vrt Attendance: 1,500; Referee: Stevo Govedarević

23 October 1996	Aluminij	0–3	Primorje	Kidričevo
			Vulić 8', 31'; Gunjač 70'	Stadium: Aluminij Sports Park; Attendance: 700; Referee: Ivan Žunič

=== Second legs ===
20 November 1996	Celje	1–5 (1–6 agg.)	Olimpija	Celje
	Kamberović 1'		Kitić 14'; Dosti 59'; Cimirotič 65'; Kujović 79'; Rakovič 86'	Stadium: Skalna Klet; Attendance: 350; Referee: Zoran Novarlić

20 November 1996	Šmartno	0–1 (0–2 agg.)	Mura	Šmartno ob Paki
			Cirkvenčič 19'	Stadium: Šmartno Stadium; Attendance: 200; Referee: Štefan Tivold

20 November 1996	Korotan Prevalje	0–3 (1–6 agg.)	Maribor	Prevalje
			Karić 60'; Fricelj 67'; Drobne 70'	Stadium: Stadion na Prevaljah; Attendance: 300; Referee: Darko Horvat

20 November 1996	Primorje	3–1 (6–1 agg.)	Aluminij	Ajdovščina
	Vulić 6', 30'; Žlogar 49'		Bošković 79'	Stadium: Ajdovščina City Stadium; Attendance: 300; Referee: Andrej Kokolj

== Semi-finals ==
The first legs of the semi-finals took place on 26 March, and the second legs took place on 9 April 1997.

=== First legs ===
26 March 1997	Maribor	2–2	Olimpija	Maribor
	Drobne 62'; Križan 74'		Ačimovič 19'; Puš 55'	Stadium: Ljudski vrt Attendance: 3,500; Referee: Žarko Vidali

26 March 1997	Mura	1–0	Primorje	Murska Sobota
	Alihodžić 27'			Stadium: Fazanerija City Stadium; Attendance: 1,500; Referee: Milan Mitrovič

=== Second legs ===
9 April 1997	Olimpija	0–2 (2–4 agg.)	Maribor	Ljubljana
			Drobne 13', 80'	Stadium: Bežigrad Stadium; Attendance: 800; Referee: Žarko Vidali

9 April 1997	Primorje	3–1 (3–2 agg.)	Mura	Ajdovščina
	Žlogar 7'; Vrabac 26', 58'		Alihodžić 32'	Stadium: Ajdovščina City Stadium; Attendance: 1,200; Referee: Srečko Kandare

== Final ==
=== First leg ===
4 June 1997
17:00 CEST

Primorje	0–0	Maribor
	Report

Ajdovščina Stadium, Ajdovščina
Attendance: 1,000
Referee: Drago Kos

=== Second leg ===
11 June 1997
17:00 CEST

Maribor	3–0	Primorje
Karić 18'; Paço 24'; Ljubobratović 85'	Report

Ljudski vrt, Maribor
Attendance: 8,000
Referee: Srečko Kandare

Maribor won 3–0 on aggregate.
