= 1999–2000 Slovenian Football Cup =

Tournament details
- Country: Slovenia
- Teams: 32

Final positions
- Champions: Olimpija (3rd title)
- Runners-up: Korotan Prevalje

Tournament statistics
- Matches played: 38
- Goals scored: 132 (3.47 per match)
- Top goal scorer: Ismet Ekmečić (8 goals)

The 1999–2000 Slovenian Football Cup was the ninth season of the Slovenian Football Cup, Slovenia's football knockout competition.

== Qualified clubs ==
=== 1998–99 Slovenian PrvaLiga members ===
- Beltinci
- Celje
- Domžale
- Gorica
- Koper
- Korotan Prevalje
- Maribor
- Mura
- Olimpija
- Primorje
- Rudar Velenje
- Triglav Kranj

=== Qualified through MNZ Regional Cups ===
- MNZ Ljubljana: Elan, Factor, Ivančna Gorica
- MNZ Maribor: Železničar Maribor, Paloma, Pohorje
- MNZ Celje: Šentjur, Šmartno
- MNZ Koper: Tabor Sežana, Ilirska Bistrica
- MNZ Nova Gorica: Idrija, Brda
- MNZ Murska Sobota: Veržej, Tromejnik
- MNZ Lendava: Odranci, Črenšovci
- MNZG-Kranj: Lesce, Britof
- MNZ Ptuj: Drava Ptuj, Aluminij

== First round ==
The first round matches took place between 24 July and 8 August 1999.

24 July 1999	Drava Ptuj	1–4	Primorje	Gerečja Vas
	Bezjak 71'	Report	Komac 21'; Kržišnik 75'; Zobec 76'; Pate 81' (pen.)	Stadium: ŠD Gerečja Vas; Attendance: 300; Referee: Drago Kos

24 July 1999	Triglav Kranj	0–4	Maribor	Kranj
		Report	Pekič 39'; Karić 41'; Bozgo 62', 77'	Stadium: Kranj Sports Centre; Attendance: 1,000; Referee: Robert Zirnstein

24 July 1999	Brda	0–2	Celje	Dobrovo
		Report	Širec 70'; Radosavljević 81'	Stadium: Vipolže Stadium; Attendance: 100; Referee: Aleksander Likič

25 July 1999	Tabor Sežana	0–1	Pohorje	Sežana
		Report	Prelec 44'	Stadium: Rajko Štolfa Stadium; Attendance: 300; Referee: Radenko Mijatović

25 July 1999	Ilirska Bistrica	0–2	Domžale	Ilirska Bistrica
		Report	Kostić 50'; Kušar 65'	Stadium: Trnovo Sports Centre; Attendance: 250; Referee: Robert Šegula

25 July 1999	Železničar Maribor	1–1 (a.e.t.) (3–2 p)	Beltinci	Maribor
	Dvoršak 68'	Report	Utroša 26'	Stadium: Tabor Sports Park; Attendance: 150; Referee: Darko Čeferin
	Penalties
	Kotnik (penalty scored); Luk (penalty scored); Kukić (penalty scored)		(penalty scored) Tratnjek; (penalty scored) Ristić

25 July 1999	Aluminij	0–2	Olimpija	Kidričevo
		Report	Fridl 29'; Moro 51'	Stadium: Aluminij Sports Park; Attendance: 800; Referee: Niko Vivod

25 July 1999	Mura	2–0	Rudar Velenje	Murska Sobota
	Dominko 59'; Lukič 69'	Report		Stadium: Fazanerija City Stadium; Attendance: 1,500; Referee: Srečko Kandare

5 August 1999	Tromejnik	0–9	Gorica	Kuzma
		Report	Vulić 3', 17', 40'; Mitraković 35'; Halili 45', 45+'; Ipavec 72', 85'; Ribarič 80'	Stadium: Kuzma Football Stadium; Attendance: 500; Referee: Robert Krajnc

8 August 1999	Britof	2–1	Factor	Britof
	Božič 44'; Grubač 51'	Report	Djukić 82'	Stadium: Britof Stadium; Attendance: 150; Referee: Damir Skomina

8 August 1999	Črenšovci	5–0	Paloma	Črenšovci
	Brunec 37' (pen.), 48'; Krapec 58'; Gruškovnjak 70'; Kustec 89'	Report		Stadium: Črenšovci Sports Park; Attendance: 300; Referee: Edi Kerčmar

8 August 1999	Veržej	(w/o)^{1}	Lesce

8 August 1999	Elan	3–1	Šmartno	Novo Mesto
	Sever 11'; Plevnik 26'; Šumar 41'	Report	Bauman 88'	Stadium: Portoval; Attendance: 300; Referee: Srečko Kandare

8 August 1999	Idrija	0–1	Odranci	Idrija
		Report	Berendijaš 90'	Stadium: Idrija City Stadium; Attendance: 150; Referee: Janez Babnik

8 August 1999	Koper	4–1	Šentjur	Koper
	Sabadin 17'; Klarica 36'; Čendak 43'; Dobrin 84'	Report	Plavsteiner 60'	Stadium: Bonifika Stadium; Attendance: 500; Referee: Aleksander Likič

8 August 1999	Ivančna Gorica	0–1	Korotan Prevalje	Ivančna Gorica
		Report	Struna 90'	Stadium: Ivančna Gorica Stadium; Attendance: 500; Referee: Silvo Borošak

Notes

- Veržej qualified for the next round automatically after Lesce withdrew from the competition.

== Round of 16 ==
The round of 16 matches took place on 31 August and 22 September 1999.

31 August 1999	Črenšovci	0–8	Maribor	Črenšovci
		Report	Bozgo 14', 18', 60'; Šimundža 31', 89'; Pregelj 46'; Židan 81', 83'	Stadium: Črenšovci Sports Park; Attendance: 1,000; Referee: Peter Šart

22 September 1999	Koper	0–3	Gorica	Koper
		Report	Ipavec 11'; Bečaj 32' (pen.), 69'	Stadium: Bonifika Stadium; Attendance: 500; Referee: Milan Mitrovič

22 September 1999	Domžale	0–2	Primorje	Domžale
		Report	Gregorič 49'; Barut 90'	Stadium: Domžale Sports Park; Attendance: 100; Referee: Matjaž Bohinc

22 September 1999	Veržej	0–8	Korotan Prevalje	Veržej
		Report	Plesec 17', 79', 88'; Zec 24', 84'; Zildžović 27'; Pirc 51'; Breznik 83'	Stadium: Veržej Sports Park; Attendance: 100; Referee: Srečko Kandare

22 September 1999	Olimpija Ljubljana	5–1	Pohorje	Ljubljana
	Čeh 16', 33'; Ekmečić 45', 62', 88'	Report	Dobaj 20'	Stadium: Bežigrad Stadium; Attendance: 100; Referee: Robert Zirnstein

22 September 1999	Britof	0–6	Celje	Britof
		Report	Radosavljević 11'; Goršek 25', 63' (pen.), 66'; Georgievski 56', 61'	Stadium: Britof Stadium; Attendance: 300; Referee: Bojan Brence

22 September 1999	Elan	2–0	Odranci	Novo Mesto
	Gruden 29'; Hasanagić 75'	Report		Stadium: Portoval; Attendance: 200; Referee: Janez Babnik

23 September 1999	Železničar Maribor	2–3	Mura	Maribor
	Kukić 41'; Pekič 77'	Report	Pima 14'; Cipot 79'; Dominko 90+4'	Stadium: Tabor Sports Park; Attendance: 300; Referee: Drago Kos

== Quarter-finals ==
The first legs of the quarter-finals took place on 12, 13 and 20 October, and the second legs took place on 20, 27 October and 25 November 1999.

=== First legs ===
12 October 1999	Celje	0–2	Maribor	Celje
		Report	Balajić 9'; Sešlar 32'	Stadium: Skalna Klet; Attendance: 800; Referee: Drago Kos

13 October 1999	Primorje	0–2	Korotan Prevalje	Ajdovščina
		Report	Tiganj 27', 44'	Stadium: Ajdovščina City Stadium; Attendance: 300; Referee: Matjaž Bohinc

13 October 1999	Gorica	5–2	Elan	Nova Gorica
	Žlogar 26', 30'; Vulić 52', 76'; Žniderčič 72'	Report	Lučić 3', 47'	Stadium: Nova Gorica Sports Park; Attendance: 300; Referee: Zoran Novarlić

20 October 1999	Mura	1–2	Olimpija	Murska Sobota
	Cifer 24'	Report	Kosič 65'; Puc 89'	Stadium: Fazanerija City Stadium; Attendance: 1,000; Referee: Ivan Žunič

=== Second legs ===
20 October 1999	Korotan Prevalje	1–0 (3–0 agg.)	Primorje	Prevalje
	Jolič 88'	Report		Stadium: Stadion na Prevaljah; Attendance: 300; Referee: Milan Mitrovič

20 October 1999	Elan	2–0 (4–5 agg.)	Gorica	Novo Mesto
	Žagar 60'; Plevnik 90+2'	Report		Stadium: Portoval; Attendance: 100; Referee: Niko Vivod

27 October 1999	Olimpija	4–1 (6–2 agg.)	Mura	Ljubljana
	Ekmečić 21', 51'; Kmetec 45', 81'	Report	Medeiros 9'	Stadium: Bežigrad Stadium; Attendance: 300; Referee: Matjaž Bohinc

25 November 1999	Maribor	3–2 (5–2 agg.)	Celje	Maribor
	Sankovič 25' (o.g.); Bozgo 76', 84'	Report	Štancar 48' (pen.); Šumulikoski 71'	Stadium: Ljudski vrt Attendance: 500; Referee: Matjaž Bohinc

== Semi-finals ==
The first legs of the semi-finals took place on 1 March, and the second legs took place on 8 March 2000.

=== First legs ===
1 March 2000	Maribor	3–1	Korotan Prevalje	Maribor
	Ekmečić 3', 9', 89'	Report	Breznik 84'	Stadium: Ljudski vrt Attendance: 1,500; Referee: Robert Krajnc

1 March 2000	Olimpija	2–1	Gorica	Ljubljana
	Osterc 19'; Kosič 53'	Report	Gunjač 23'	Stadium: Bežigrad Stadium; Attendance: 500; Referee: Darko Čeferin

=== Second legs ===
8 March 2000	Korotan Prevalje	3–0 (4–3 agg.)	Maribor	Prevalje
	Kamberović 40', 45'; Poglajen 84'	Report		Stadium: Stadion na Prevaljah; Attendance: 800; Referee: Srečko Kandare

8 March 2000	Gorica	1–1 (2–3 agg.)	Olimpija	Nova Gorica
	Alomerović 82' (pen.)	Report	Zulič 43'	Stadium: Nova Gorica Sports Park; Attendance: 700; Referee: Ivan Žunič

== Final ==
10 May 2000
16:30 CEST

Korotan Prevalje	2–1	Olimpija
Tiganj 44', 53'	Report	Kosič 43'

Stadion na Prevaljah, Prevalje
Attendance: 2,000
Referee: Silvo Borošak
17 May 2000
18:00 CEST

Olimpija	2–0	Korotan Prevalje
Kujović 44'; Kmetec 65'	Report

Bežigrad Stadium, Ljubljana
Attendance: 2,000
Referee: Robert Zirnstein

Olimpija won 3–2 on aggregate.
