= 1995–96 Slovenian Football Cup =

Tournament details
- Country: Slovenia
- Teams: 32

Final positions
- Champions: Olimpija (2nd title)
- Runners-up: Primorje

Tournament statistics
- Matches played: 38
- Goals scored: 114 (3 per match)

The 1995–96 Slovenian Football Cup was the fifth season of the Slovenian Football Cup, Slovenia's football knockout competition.

== Qualified clubs ==
=== 1994–95 Slovenian PrvaLiga members ===
- Beltinci
- Celje
- Gorica
- Izola
- Jadran Dekani
- Koper
- Kočevje
- Korotan Prevalje
- Ljubljana
- Maribor
- Mura
- Naklo
- Olimpija
- Primorje
- Rudar Velenje
- Vevče

=== Qualified through MNZ Regional Cups ===
- MNZ Ljubljana: Zagorje, Črnuče
- MNZ Maribor: Železničar Maribor, Pobrežje
- MNZ Celje: Šentjur, Dravinja
- MNZ Koper: Ilirska Bistrica
- MNZ Nova Gorica: Adria
- MNZ Murska Sobota: Cankova, Bakovci
- MNZ Lendava: Nafta Lendava, Čentiba
- MNZG-Kranj: Sava Kranj, Visoko
- MNZ Ptuj: Aluminij, Drava Ptuj

== First round ==
The first round matches took place on 1, 2, 5 and 6 August 1995.

Team 1	Score	Team 2
Nafta Lendava	2–6	Maribor
Kočevje	0–3 (w/o)	Celje
Rudar Velenje	1–0	Beltinci
Vevče	1–3	Olimpija
Adria	0–3	Gorica
Izola	0–0 (a.e.t.) (3–5 p)	Mura
Korotan Prevalje	0–0 (a.e.t.) (3–4 p)	Primorje
Aluminij	3–1	Drava Ptuj
Železničar Maribor	1–2	Ilirska Bistrica
Pobrežje	0–3	Koper
Cankova	0–8	Šentjur
Dravinja	0–2	Železničar Ljubljana
Črnuče	3–1	Zagorje
Visoko	1–2	Naklo
Čentiba	2–1	Sava Kranj
Bakovci	3–0 (w/o)	Jadran Dekani

== Round of 16 ==
The round of 16 matches took place on 20 September and 4 October 1995.

20 September 1995	Aluminij	0–5	Primorje	Kidričevo
			Lučić 9', 65', 80'; Želko 30'; Vončina 49'	Stadium: Aluminij Sports Park; Attendance: 300; Referee: Dževad Salkič

20 September 1995	Koper	0–1	Gorica	Koper
			Turković 60'	Stadium: Bonifika Stadium; Attendance: 1,000; Referee: Milan Mitrovič

20 September 1995	Ilirska Bistrica	1–3	Mura	Ilirska Bistrica
	Udovič 40'		Kmetec 45'; Rous 55', 65'	Stadium: Transport Stadium; Attendance: 1,100; Referee: Alojz Žerak

20 September 1995	Železničar Ljubljana	4–2 (a.e.t.)	Črnuče	Ljubljana
	Čosić 67'; Topić 83', 108'; Muhvič 100'		R. Perkovič 42', 77'	Stadium: ŽŠD Ljubljana; Attendance: 300; Referee: Štefan Tivold

20 September 1995	Čentiba	1–17	Celje	Čentiba
	Nagy		Kamberović; Bauman; Rakovič; Goršek; Komar; B. Romih	Stadium: Čentiba Sports Field; Attendance: 400; Referee: Dušan Turk

20 September 1995	Naklo	0–0 (a.e.t.) (3–2 p)	Šentjur	Naklo
				Stadium: Naklo Sports Park; Attendance: 200; Referee: Božo Tabar
	Penalties
	Kečan (penalty scored); Ahčin (penalty scored); B. Pavlič (penalty scored)		(penalty scored) Marinček; (penalty scored) Drobne

4 October 1995	Bakovci	0–2	Olimpija	Bakovci
			Šiljak 44'; Nikčević 75'	Stadium: ŠRC Bakovci; Attendance: 600; Referee: Silvo Borošak

4 October 1995	Rudar Velenje	0–0 (a.e.t.) (4–2 p)	Maribor	Velenje
				Stadium: Ob Jezeru City Stadium; Attendance: 1,200; Referee: Štefan Tivold
	Penalties
	Žurman (penalty scored); Komar (penalty scored); Balagič (penalty scored); Pavlović (penalty scored); Cvikl (penalty missed)		(penalty scored) Makragič; (penalty scored) Zirojević; (penalty missed) Galič; (penalty missed) Fricelj

== Quarter-finals ==
The first legs of the quarter-finals took place on 25 October, and the second legs took place on 22 November 1995.

=== First legs ===
25 October 1995	Olimpija	3–1	Gorica	Ljubljana
	Šiljak 28', 82'; Zulič 74'		Vulić 7'	Stadium: Bežigrad Stadium; Attendance: 1,500; Referee: Josip Jakopiček

25 October 1995	Celje	2–0	Mura	Celje
	Rakovič 2'; Bauman 15'			Stadium: Skalna Klet; Attendance: 800; Referee: Ivan Žunič

25 October 1995	Železničar Ljubljana	0–1	Rudar Velenje	Ljubljana
			Komar 9'	Stadium: ŽŠD Ljubljana; Attendance: 350; Referee: Žarko Hvalič

25 October 1995	Naklo	0–2	Primorje	Kranj
			Vrabac 19', 80' (pen.)	Stadium: Kranj Sports Centre; Attendance: 400; Referee: Jože Klinc

=== Second legs ===
22 November 1995	Gorica	0–2 (1–5 agg.)	Olimpija	Nova Gorica
			Hadžić 9'; Cimirotič 23'	Stadium: Nova Gorica Sports Park; Attendance: 1,500; Referee: Zoran Novarlić

22 November 1995	Mura	2–1 (2–3 agg.)	Celje	Murska Sobota
	Rous 28'; Breznik 67'		Bauman 9'	Stadium: Fazanerija City Stadium; Attendance: 1,000; Referee: Anton Beton

22 November 1995	Rudar Velenje	2–1 (3–1 agg.)	Železničar Ljubljana	Velenje
	Ekmečić 19', 36'		Kujović 9'	Stadium: Ob Jezeru City Stadium; Attendance: 500; Referee: Josip Jakopiček

22 November 1995	Primorje	3–2 (5–2 agg.)	Naklo	Ajdovščina
	Lučić 7'; Stanič 52'; Vončina 73'		Kečan 15'; Ahčin 39'	Stadium: Ajdovščina City Stadium; Attendance: 500; Referee: Stevo Govedarević

== Semi-finals ==
The first legs of the semi-finals took place on 6 March, and the second legs took place on 20 March 1996.

=== First legs ===
6 March 1996	Olimpija	3–1	Rudar Velenje	Ljubljana
	Bozgo 16'; Cimirotič 67'; Šiljak 80'		Žurman 47'	Stadium: Bežigrad Stadium; Attendance: 1,000; Referee: Žarko Hvalič

6 March 1996	Primorje	0–1	Celje	Ajdovščina
			Kamberović 85'	Stadium: Ajdovščina City Stadium; Attendance: 700; Referee: Zoran Novarlić

=== Second legs ===
20 March 1996	Rudar Velenje	0–0 (1–3 agg.)	Olimpija	Velenje
				Stadium: Ob Jezeru City Stadium; Attendance: 800; Referee: Žarko Vidali

20 March 1996	Celje	0–2 (1–2 agg.)	Primorje	Celje
			Vončina 8'; Božič 82'	Stadium: Skalna Klet; Attendance: 1,000; Referee: Srečko Kandare

== Final ==
=== First leg ===
15 May 1996
16:00 CEST

Primorje	0–1	Olimpija
		Šiljak 13'

Ajdovščina Stadium, Ajdovščina
Attendance: 2,000
Referee: Vili Kranjc

=== Second leg ===
5 June 1996
20:15 CEST

Olimpija	1–1	Primorje
Velkoski 3'		Vrabac 88'

Bežigrad Stadium, Ljubljana
Attendance: 2,000
Referee: Zoran Novarlič

Olimpija won 2–1 on aggregate.
