= 1995–96 Slovenian PrvaLiga =

Slovenian PrvaLiga
- Season: 1995–96
- Champions: Gorica (1st title)
- Relegated: Izola
- UEFA Cup: Gorica; Mura
- Cup Winners' Cup: Olimpija
- Intertoto Cup: Maribor
- Matches played: 180
- Goals scored: 480 (2.67 per match)
- Top goalscorer: Ermin Šiljak (28 goals)
- Biggest home win: Celje 11–0 Izola
- Biggest away win: Izola 0–6 Olimpija
- Highest scoring: Celje 11–0 Izola
- Longest winning run: 4 games Celje; Gorica; Beltinci; Olimpija; Primorje
- Longest unbeaten run: 23 games Gorica
- Longest winless run: 25 games Izola
- Longest losing run: 15 games Izola
- Highest attendance: 7,000; Maribor 5–1 Olimpija
- Lowest attendance: 100; Izola 0–5 Maribor
- Total attendance: 296,600
- Average attendance: 1,647

The 1995–96 Slovenian PrvaLiga was the fifth season of Slovenian top division football. The season started on 30 July 1995 and ended on 8 June 1996 with each team playing a total of 36 matches.

== League table ==
Pos	Team	Pld	W	D	L	GF	GA	GD	Pts	Qualification or relegation
1	Gorica (C)	36	18	13	5	49	22	+27	67	Qualification to UEFA Cup preliminary round
2	Olimpija	36	19	7	10	79	39	+40	64	Qualification to Cup Winners' Cup qualifying round
3	Mura	36	15	13	8	43	29	+14	58	Qualification to UEFA Cup preliminary round
4	Maribor	36	14	11	11	47	32	+15	53	Qualification to Intertoto Cup group stage
5	Celje	36	13	12	11	62	47	+15	51	
6	Beltinci	36	13	11	12	41	40	+1	50	
7	Rudar Velenje	36	13	10	13	46	37	+9	49	
8	Primorje	36	13	9	14	56	48	+8	48	
9	Korotan Prevalje (O)	36	11	9	16	44	46	−2	42	Qualification to relegation play-offs
10	Izola (D, R)	36	1	5	30	13	140	−127	8	Withdrew from the competition (Note: Izola were originally relegated to the Second League, but were withdraw from the competition due to financial problems, and then later were dissolved.)

Source: PrvaLiga (in Slovene)
(C) Champions; (D) Disqualified; (O) Play-off winners; (R) Relegated

=== Relegation play-offs ===
12 June 1996
18:00 CEST

Nafta Lendava	0–1	Korotan Prevalje
		Nikčević 75'

City Stadium, Lendava
Attendance: 2,000
Referee: Srečko Kandare
16 June 1996
18:00 CEST

Korotan Prevalje	2–1	Nafta Lendava
Šumnik 5'; Dvoršak 58'		Tadić 30' (pen.)

Stadion na Prevaljah, Prevalje
Attendance: 1,200
Referee: Milan Mitrović

Korotan Prevalje won 3–1 on aggregate.

== Results ==
Every team plays four times against their opponents, twice at home and twice on the road, for a total of 36 matches.

=== First half of the season ===
Home \ Away	BEL	CEL	GOR	IZO	KPR	MAR	MUR	OLI	PRI	RUD
Beltinci		1–2	1–1	5–1	2–1	0–0	0–0	2–1	0–3	0–2
Celje	2–0		2–1	5–1	2–3	3–3	1–1	1–1	3–1	4–6
Gorica	0–0	2–1		3–0	2–0	0–0	2–1	2–1	3–1	3–1
Izola	0–2	0–2	0–2		1–0	2–2	1–1	0–6	1–1	0–1
Korotan Prevalje	1–1	3–2	1–2	2–0		0–0	1–1	1–2	0–0	2–0
Maribor	1–2	0–0	1–0	5–1	1–2		1–2	5–1	2–0	2–0
Mura	1–1	1–0	1–0	4–0	2–0	1–0		1–1	1–1	1–1
Olimpija	5–0	3–0	0–3	10–0	2–1	0–1	1–2		1–1	1–1
Primorje	1–0	3–1	1–4	6–0	1–1	1–0	5–1	0–3		1–1
Rudar Velenje	1–1	0–1	1–1	5–1	2–3	2–0	0–1	2–1	2–0	

Source: PrvaLiga (in Slovene)
Legend: Blue = home team win; Yellow = draw; Red = away team win.

=== Second half of the season ===
Home \ Away	BEL	CEL	GOR	IZO	KPR	MAR	MUR	OLI	PRI	RUD
Beltinci		2–1	0–0	3–0	4–1	2–0	2–0	1–2	0–2	1–0
Celje	0–1		1–0	11–0	5–0	1–1	1–0	3–1	1–1	0–0
Gorica	2–1	1–1		3–0	1–0	0–0	1–0	2–2	1–1	1–0
Izola	0–3	1–1	0–2		1–1	0–5	0–3	0–5	1–5	0–2
Korotan Prevalje	0–0	0–1	0–0	8–0		2–0	0–1	1–2	4–2	0–1
Maribor	3–0	2–2	1–0	3–1	1–0		1–1	2–1	2–0	0–2
Mura	1–0	0–0	1–1	7–0	2–2	1–0		0–0	2–1	1–0
Olimpija	5–3	3–0	0–0	4–0	2–1	1–0	2–0		0–1	2–0
Primorje	0–0	4–1	0–2	7–0	0–1	0–1	1–0	1–4		2–1
Rudar Velenje	0–0	0–0	1–1	5–0	0–1	1–1	1–0	1–3	3–1	

Source: PrvaLiga (in Slovene)
Legend: Blue = home team win; Yellow = draw; Red = away team win.

== Top goalscorers ==
Rank	Player	Club	Goals
1	(Slovenia) Ermin Šiljak	Olimpija	28
2	(Bosnia and Herzegovina) Faik Kamberović	Celje	24
3	(Slovenia) Dinko Vrabac	Primorje	18
4	(Slovenia) Sandi Valentinčič	Gorica	16
5	(Slovenia) Mihael Vončina	Primorje	14
5	(Albania) Kliton Bozgo	Olimpija	14
5	(Slovenia) Ismet Ekmečić	Rudar Velenje	14
8	(Slovenia) Novica Nikčević	Korotan Prevalje/Olimpija	13
8	(Russia) Mikhail Khlebalin	Mura	13
10	(Slovenia) Matjaž Cvikl	Rudar Velenje	10

== See also ==
- 1995 Slovenian Supercup
- 1995–96 Slovenian Football Cup
- 1995–96 Slovenian Second League
