= 1998–99 Slovenian Football Cup =

Tournament details
- Country: Slovenia
- Teams: 32

Final positions
- Champions: Maribor (4th title)
- Runners-up: Olimpija

Tournament statistics
- Matches played: 38
- Goals scored: 139 (3.66 per match)
- Top goal scorer: Ismet Ekmečić (8 goals)

The 1998–99 Slovenian Football Cup was the eighth season of the Slovenian Football Cup, Slovenia's football knockout competition.

== Qualified clubs ==
=== 1997–98 Slovenian PrvaLiga members ===
- Beltinci
- Celje
- Gorica
- Korotan Prevalje
- Maribor
- Mura
- Olimpija
- Primorje
- Rudar Velenje
- Vevče

=== Qualified through MNZ Regional Cups ===
- MNZ Ljubljana: Ivančna Gorica, Kolpa, Domžale
- MNZ Maribor: Pobrežje, Paloma, Rogoza
- MNZ Celje: Šoštanj, Šmartno
- MNZ Koper: Tabor Sežana, Jadran
- MNZ Nova Gorica: Renče, Brda
- MNZ Murska Sobota: Veržej, Goričanka, Ižakovci
- MNZ Lendava: Nafta Lendava, Turnišče
- MNZG-Kranj: Triglav Kranj, Zarica
- MNZ Ptuj: Drava Ptuj, Aluminij, Dornava

== First round ==
The first round matches took place between 5 August and 2 September 1998.

| 5 August 1998 | Šmartno | 2–0 | Korotan Prevalje | Šmartno ob Paki |
| | Smajlović 18'; Mujanovič 83' | Report | | Stadium: Šmartno Stadium; Attendance: 200; Referee: Silvo Borošak |

| 5 August 1998 | Rogoza | 2–4 | Beltinci | Rogoza |
| | Daljevič 79'; Najvirt 82' | Report | Dobi 16', 37', 89'; Kotnik 84' | Stadium: Rogoza Sports Park; Attendance: 100; Referee: Niko Vivod |

| 5 August 1998 | Vevče | 0–1 | Olimpija | Vevče |
| | | Report | Ekmečić 47' | Stadium: Slavija Stadium; Attendance: 300; Referee: Drago Kos |

| 5 August 1998 | Jadran | 0–3 | Maribor | Kozina |
| | | Report | Filipović 17'; Djuranović 30'; Kollari 38' | Stadium: Krvavi Potok Stadium; Attendance: 400; Referee: Ivan Žunič |

| 5 August 1998 | Pobrežje | 0–4 | Primorje | Maribor |
| | | Report | Vulić 36', 85'; Lučić 45'; Marušič 51' | Stadium: Pobrežje Stadium; Attendance: 150; Referee: Robert Šegula |

| 5 August 1998 | Kolpa | 3–4 (a.e.t.) | Rudar Velenje | Podzemelj |
| | Filak 23', 66'; Sever 59' | Report | Vidojević 20', 99'; Javornik 62'; Brezič 64' | Stadium: Podzemelj Sports Park; Attendance: 400; Referee: Andrej Kokolj |

| 5 August 1998 | Ivančna Gorica | 0–2 | Triglav Kranj | Mirna |
| | | Report | Čustović 78'; Markelj 88' | Stadium: Mirna na Dolenjskem Stadium; Attendance: 300; Referee: Damjan Mihalič |

| 5 August 1998 | Celje | 1–0 | Domžale | Celje |
| | Gobec 21' | Report | | Stadium: Skalna Klet; Attendance: 300; Referee: Željko Lackovič |

| 5 August 1998 | Ižakovci | 0–6 | Nafta | Ižakovci |
| | | Report | Utroša 7', 8', 38' (pen.), 49'; Gabor 11'; Varga 69' | Stadium: Igrišče v Ižakovcih; Attendance: 150; Referee: Marjan Rajh |

| 5 August 1998 | Aluminij | 2–0 | Brda | Kidričevo |
| | Kolar 55'; Damiš 87' | Report | | Stadium: Aluminij Sports Park; Attendance: 100; Referee: Andrej Kokolj |

| 9 August 1998 | Tabor Sežana | 6–0 | Turnišče | Sežana |
| | Grlj 32'; Barut 56', 70', 82'; Stanič 60'; Želko 88' (pen.) | Report | | Stadium: Sežana City Stadium; Attendance: 100; Referee: Matjaž Bohinc |

| 9 August 1998 | Zarica Kranj | 1–3 | Goriške Opekarne | Kranj |
| | Zaletel 35' | Report | Žgavec 19' (pen.); Kojičić 32', 41' | Stadium: Zarica Sports Park; Attendance: 100; Referee: Aleksander Likič |

| 9 August 1998 | Drava Ptuj | 0–1 | Paloma | Ptuj |
| | | Report | Šemrl 42' (pen.) | Stadium: Ptuj City Stadium; Attendance: 200; Referee: Niko Vivod |

| 9 August 1998 | Goričanka | 3–0 | Dornava | Sveti Jurij |
| | Skledar 5', 57'; Šuša 71' | Report | | Stadium: Igrišče NK Goričanka; Attendance: 150; Referee: Željko Lackovič |

| 2 September 1998 | Gorica | 2–3 | Mura | Nova Gorica |
| | Žlogar 50'; Nikčević 68' | Report | A. Baranja 10', 71'; Škaper 77' | Stadium: Nova Gorica Sports Park; Attendance: 1,000; Referee: Srečko Kandare |

| 2 September 1998 | Veržej | 5–3 (a.e.t.) | Šoštanj | Veržej |
| | Brunec 30', 63'; Osterc 88'; Stajnko 102'; Sunčič 114' | Report | Dragić 50'; Mir 62'; Čanić 73' (pen.) | Stadium: Veržej Sports Park; Attendance: 100; Referee: Peter Šart |

== Round of 16 ==
The round of 16 matches took place on 8 and 9 September 1998.

| 8 September 1998 | Tabor Sežana | 1–2 | Maribor | Sežana |
| | Želko 16' (pen.) | Report | Kmetec 15', 82' | Stadium: Sežana City Stadium; Attendance: 700; Referee: Stevo Govedarević |

| 8 September 1998 | Goričanka | 0–6 | Olimpija | Sveti Jurij |
| | | Report | Ekmečić 8', 13', 86', 90'; Grizold 57'; Miškič 66' | Stadium: Igrišče NK Goričanka; Attendance: 250; Referee: Niko Vivod |

| 9 September 1998 | Goriške Opekarne | 1–0 | Celje | Ajdovščina |
| | Kojičić 90+1' | Report | | Stadium: Ajdovščina City Stadium; Attendance: 400; Referee: Andrej Kokolj |

| 9 September 1998 | Triglav Kranj | 1–2 | Rudar Velenje | Kranj |
| | Plevnik 86' (pen.) | Report | Brezič 8'; Pavlović 80' | Stadium: Kranj Sports Centre; Attendance: 500; Referee: Žarko Vidali |

| 9 September 1998 | Mura | 5–2 | Beltinci | Murska Sobota |
| | Škaper 4', 69', 90'; D. Baranja 73'; Cipot 84' | Report | Kokaš 19'; S. Baranja 28' | Stadium: Fazanerija City Stadium; Attendance: 3,000; Referee: Milan Mitrovič |

| 9 September 1998 | Veržej | 0–7 | Paloma | Veržej |
| | | Report | Žabota 6', 27'; Krapša 23'; S. Stojanov 54', 71', 72'; M. Stojanov 80' | Stadium: Veržej Sports Park; Attendance: 50; Referee: Peter Šart |

| 9 September 1998 | Aluminij | 0–2 (a.e.t.) | Nafta | Kidričevo |
| | | Report | Tompa 104'; Utroša 119' | Stadium: Aluminij Sports Park; Attendance: 250; Referee: Darko Čeferin |

| 9 September 1998 | Šmartno | 4–2 (a.e.t.) | Primorje | Šmartno ob Paki |
| | Mujanovič 25'; Smajlović 57'; Javornik 100'; Mulahmetović 117' (o.g.) | Report | Mavrič 13'; Vulić 86' | Stadium: Šmartno Stadium; Attendance: 250; Referee: Srečko Kandare |

== Quarter-finals ==
The first legs of the quarter-finals took place on 21 October, and the second legs took place on 4 November 1998.

=== First legs ===
| 21 October 1998 | Nafta | 0–3 | Mura | Lendava |
| | | Report | Škaper 43', 54'; Cipot 84' | Stadium: NK Nafta Stadium; Attendance: 600; Referee: Stevo Govedarević |

| 21 October 1998 | Maribor | 1–0 | Rudar Velenje | Maribor |
| | Bozgo 69' | Report | | Stadium: Ljudski vrt Attendance: 1,800; Referee: Robert Zirnstein |

| 21 October 1998 | Šmartno | 3–0 | Paloma | Slovenske Konjice |
| | Javornik 69' (pen.), 75'; Smajlović 73' | Report | | Stadium: Dobrava Stadium; Attendance: 150; Referee: Drago Kos |

| 21 October 1998 | Goriške Opekarne | 1–2 | Olimpija | Renče |
| | Reščič 87' | Report | Jukić 21'; Kujović 32' | Stadium: Renče Sports Park; Attendance: 300; Referee: Ivan Žunič |

=== Second legs ===
| 4 November 1998 | Mura | 1–1 (4–1 agg.) | Nafta | Murska Sobota |
| | Gutalj 11' | Report | Šabjan 78' (pen.) | Stadium: Fazanerija City Stadium; Attendance: 300; Referee: Silvo Borošak |

| 4 November 1998 | Rudar Velenje | 2–2 (2–3 agg.) | Maribor | Velenje |
| | Vidojević 60'; Pavlović 66' | Report | Gajser 14'; Bozgo 80' | Stadium: Ob Jezeru City Stadium; Attendance: 800; Referee: Drago Kos |

| 4 November 1998 | Paloma | 1–2 (1–5 agg.) | Šmartno | Sladki Vrh |
| | Žabota 30' | Report | Žnuderl 33'; Pokleka 40' | Stadium: NK Paloma Stadium; Attendance: 250; Referee: Radenko Mijatović |

| 4 November 1998 | Olimpija | 6–0 (8–1 agg.) | Goriške Opekarne | Ljubljana |
| | Ekmečić 34', 59', 75'; Pejković 37' (pen.); Fileković 72'; Deisinger 84' | Report | | Stadium: Bežigrad Stadium; Attendance: 150; Referee: Božo Tabar |

== Semi-finals ==
The first legs of the semi-finals took place on 7 April, and the second legs took place on 14 April 1999.

=== First legs ===
| 7 April 1999 | Olimpija | 1–1 | Šmartno | Ljubljana |
| | Čeh 55' | Report | Mujanovič 8' | Stadium: Bežigrad Stadium; Attendance: 500; Referee: Ivan Žunič |

| 7 April 1999 | Maribor | 3–1 | Mura | Maribor |
| | Bozgo 46', 54'; Djuranovič 76' | Report | Škaper 52' | Stadium: Ljudski vrt Attendance: 2,000; Referee: Milan Mitrovič |

=== Second legs ===
| 14 April 1999 | Šmartno | 0–1 (1–2 agg.) | Olimpija | Šmartno ob Paki |
| | | Report | Kosič 82' | Stadium: Šmartno Stadium; Attendance: 1,400; Referee: Robert Zirnstein |

| 14 April 1999 | Mura | 1–2 (2–5 agg.) | Maribor | Murska Sobota |
| | Cener 45' | Report | Bozgo 10'; Jolič 25' | Stadium: Fazanerija City Stadium; Attendance: 1,500; Referee: Drago Kos |

== Final ==
=== First leg ===
26 May 1999
18:30 CEST

| Olimpija | 2–3 | Maribor |
|---|---|---|
| Pejković 47' (pen.); Čaušević 52' | Report | Djuranovič 61'; Bozgo 65', 83' |

Bežigrad Stadium, Ljubljana
Attendance: 2,000
Referee: Drago Kos

=== Second leg ===
16 June 1999
20:00 CEST

| Maribor | 2–0 | Olimpija |
|---|---|---|
| Filipović 38'; Jolič 82' | Report |

Ljudski vrt, Maribor
Attendance: 6,500
Referee: Matjaž Bohinc

Maribor won 5–2 on aggregate.
