= 1994–95 Slovenian Football Cup =

Tournament details
- Country: Slovenia
- Teams: 32

Final positions
- Champions: Mura (1st title)
- Runners-up: Celje

Tournament statistics
- Matches played: 38
- Goals scored: 128 (3.37 per match)

The 1994–95 Slovenian Football Cup was the fourth season of the Slovenian Football Cup, Slovenia's football knockout competition.

== Qualified clubs ==
=== 1993–94 Slovenian PrvaLiga members ===
- Beltinci
- Celje
- Gorica
- Izola
- Jadran Dekani
- Koper
- Krka
- Ljubljana
- Maribor
- Mura
- Naklo
- Olimpija
- Primorje
- Rudar Velenje
- Slovan
- Svoboda

=== Qualified through MNZ Regional Cups ===
- MNZ Ljubljana: Zagorje, Kočevje
- MNZ Maribor: Kovinar Maribor, Korotan Prevalje
- MNZ Celje: Radeče, Dravinja
- MNZ Koper: Ilirska Bistrica
- MNZ Nova Gorica: Bilje
- MNZ Murska Sobota: Serdica, Ižakovci
- MNZ Lendava: Turnišče, Odranci
- MNZG-Kranj: Triglav Kranj, Visoko
- MNZ Ptuj: Aluminij, Bistrica

== First round ==
The first round matches took place on 29 and 30 July 1994.

Team 1	Score	Team 2
Serdica	1–9	Mura
Triglav Kranj	0–6	Rudar Velenje
Naklo	4–2	Svoboda
Olimpija	1–0	Zagorje
Izola	2–0	Jadran Dekani
Slovan	1–7	Korotan Prevalje
Železničar Ljubljana	0–3	Celje
Kočevje	2–0	Koper
Kovinar Maribor	0–2	Gorica
Ilirska Bistrica	2–3	Maribor
Odranci	2–2 (3–4 p)	Bilje
Ižakovci	0–3	Turnišče
Aluminij	4–1	Radeče
Dravinja	3–1	Bistrica
Krka	1–3	Primorje
Visoko	0–10	Beltinci

== Round of 16 ==
The round of 16 matches took place between 31 August and 19 October 1994.

31 August 1994	Aluminij	0–4	Olimpija	Kidričevo
			Hadžialagić 7', 33'; Dosti 40'; Šiljak 60'	Stadium: Aluminij Sports Park; Attendance: 800; Referee: Silvo Borošak

31 August 1994	Mura	2–0	Korotan Prevalje	Murska Sobota
	Bakula 57'; Gajser 90'			Stadium: Fazanerija City Stadium; Attendance: 800; Referee: Zlatko Rauković

31 August 1994	Celje	2–0	Naklo	Celje
	Ntoko 49', 72'			Stadium: Skalna Klet; Attendance: 700; Referee: Alojz Žerak

31 August 1994	Gorica	1–0	Turnišče	Nova Gorica
	Bečaj 39'			Stadium: Nova Gorica Sports Park; Attendance: 700; Referee: Žarko Vidali

31 August 1994	Rudar Velenje	2–2 (4–3 p)	Primorje	Velenje
	Pešič 3'; Dzafič 35'		Rosič 36'; Kitić 38'	Stadium: Ob Jezeru City Stadium; Attendance: 700; Referee: Darko Jamšek
	Penalties
	S. Javornik (penalty scored); Komar (penalty scored); Čanič (penalty scored); Žurman (penalty scored)		(penalty scored) Stanič; (penalty scored) Adžič; (penalty scored) Vrabac

1 September 1994	Beltinci	4–0	Dravinja	Beltinci
	Črnko 15'; Herceg 47'; Škaper 53'; Osterc 72'			Stadium: Beltinci Sports Park; Attendance: 700; Referee: Srečko Kandare

1 September 1994	Bilje	0–4	Izola	Bilje
			Želko 11'; Velkoski 35'; D. Gregorič 45'; Ban 90'	Stadium: Stadion V dolinci Attendance: 500; Referee: Slavko Špilar

19 October 1994	Maribor	4–1	Kočevje	Maribor
	Bozgo 13', 89'; Židan 39'; Djurovski 78'		Adrović 48'	Stadium: Ljudski vrt Attendance: 500; Referee: Ivan Žunič

== Quarter-finals ==
The first legs of the quarter-finals took place on 27 November, and the second legs took place on 3 and 4 December 1994.

=== First legs ===
27 November 1994	Olimpija	1–4	Beltinci	Ljubljana
	Vrabac 40'		Škaper 15'; Vorobyov 31', 51'; Herceg 58'	Stadium: Bežigrad Stadium; Attendance: 2,000; Referee: Darko Jamšek

27 November 1994	Gorica	1–0	Maribor	Nova Gorica
	Valentinčič 32' (pen.)			Stadium: Nova Gorica Sports Park; Attendance: 2,000; Referee: Vili Kranjc

27 November 1994	Rudar Velenje	0–2	Celje	Velenje
			Ntoko 30', 65'	Stadium: Ob Jezeru City Stadium; Attendance: 1,000; Referee: Žarko Vidali

27 November 1994	Izola	0–0	Mura	Izola
				Stadium: Izola City Stadium; Attendance: 350; Referee: Štefan Tivold

=== Second legs ===
3 December 1994	Mura	3–2 (3–2 agg.)	Izola	Murska Sobota
	Breznik 30', 37' (pen.); Topić 44'		Buylygbashi 89'; Milori 90' (pen.)	Stadium: Fazanerija City Stadium; Attendance: 800; Referee: Žarko Hvalič

4 December 1994	Beltinci	1–1 (5–2 agg.)	Olimpija	Beltinci
	Škaper 59'		Hadžialagić 40'	Stadium: Beltinci Sports Park; Attendance: 3,500; Referee: Anton Beton

4 December 1994	Maribor	1–0 (1–1 agg.) (4–1 p)	Gorica	Maribor
	Bozgo 83'			Stadium: Ljudski vrt Attendance: 2,500; Referee: Milan Mitrovič
	Penalties
	Bozgo (penalty scored); Karić (penalty scored); Šimundža (penalty scored); Milevski (penalty scored)		(penalty scored) Vulić

4 December 1994	Celje	0–1 (2–1 agg.)	Rudar Velenje	Celje
			Pavlović 55'	Stadium: Skalna Klet; Attendance: 650; Referee: Josip Jakopiček

== Semi-finals ==
The first legs of the semi-finals took place on 15 March, and the second legs took place on 5 April 1995.

=== First legs ===
15 March 1995	Beltinci	1–1	Mura	Beltinci
	Škaper 89'		Gajser 77'	Stadium: Beltinci Sports Park; Attendance: 4,000; Referee: Milan Mitrovič

15 March 1995	Celje	1–0	Maribor	Celje
	Bauman 66' (pen.)			Stadium: Skalna Klet; Attendance: 1,500; Referee: Štefan Tivold

=== Second legs ===
5 April 1995	Mura	0–0 (1–1a agg.)	Beltinci	Murska Sobota
				Stadium: Fazanerija City Stadium; Attendance: 4,000; Referee: Žarko Hvalič

5 April 1995	Maribor	1–1 (1–2 agg.)	Celje	Maribor
	Kek 44'		Turk 67'	Stadium: Ljudski vrt Attendance: 3,000; Referee: Milan Mitrovič

== Final ==
=== First leg ===
10 May 1995
16:30 CEST

Celje	1–1	Mura
Sešlar 55' (pen.)		Rous 73'

Skalna Klet, Celje
Attendance: 2,000
Referee: Žarko Hvalič

=== Second leg ===
24 May 1995
16:30 CEST

Mura	1–0	Celje
Topić 84'

Fazanerija, Murska Sobota
Attendance: 4,500
Referee: Žarko Vidali

Mura won 2–1 on aggregate.
