= 1995 Slovenian Supercup =

- Event: 1995 Slovenian Supercup
Olimpija	Mura
2	1
- Date: 26 July 1995
- Venue: Bežigrad, Ljubljana
- Referee: Žarko Hvalič
- Attendance: 3,000

The Slovenian Supercup 1995 was a football match that saw the 1994–95 PrvaLiga champions, Olimpija, face off against the 1994–95 Slovenian Cup winners, Mura. The match was held on 26 July 1995 at the Bežigrad Stadium in Ljubljana.

== Match details ==
26 July 1995
20:00 CEST

Olimpija	2–1	Mura
Bozgo 16'; Kojičić 86'		Khlebalin 32'

Bežigrad, Ljubljana
Attendance: 3,000
Referee: Žarko Hvalič

Olimpija Ljubljana	Mura

Olimpija:
GK	1	(Slovenia) Marko Simeunovič
DF	2	(Slovenia) Robert Englaro
DF	4	(Slovenia) Samir Zulič	Substituted off
DF	3	(Slovenia) Aleksander Knavs
DF	5	(Slovenia) Edin Hadžialagič
MF	8	(Slovenia) Mladen Rudonja
MF	7	(Slovenia) Đoni Novak
MF	20	(Federal Republic of Yugoslavia) Branislav Kojičić
FW	10	(Albania) Kliton Bozgo
FW	14	(Slovenia) Sebastjan Cimirotič
CF	11	(Slovenia) Ermin Šiljak	Substituted off
Substitutes:
MF	4	(Slovenia) Dušan Kosič	Substituted in
FW	9	(Slovenia) Novica Nikčevič	Substituted in
Manager:
(Slovenia) Miloš Šoškič

Mura:
GK	12	(Slovenia) Štefan Černjavič
DF	2	(Slovenia) Vladimir Kokol
DF	3	(Slovenia) Ingmar Bloudek
DF	4	(Slovenia) Peter Breznik
DF	5	(Slovenia) Andrej Poljšak
MF	6	(Bosnia and Herzegovina) Haris Alihodžić
MF	7	(Slovenia) Danijel Brezič
MF	8	(Slovenia) Damjan Gajser
MF	9	(Slovenia) Robert Belec
MF	10	(Croatia) Marijan Bakula
CF	16	(Russia) Mikhail Khlebalin
Substitutes:
Manager:
(Croatia) Marin Kovačić
