= Slovenia national football team results (unofficial matches) =

National football team results

This is a list of unofficial international football games played by the Slovenia national football team.

== Results ==
Key

Win Draw Loss

=== Kingdom of Serbs, Croats and Slovenes ===
23 June 1921 Friendly	Slovenia (Kingdom of Yugoslavia)	0–5	France	Ljubljana, Kingdom of SCS
			Nicolas 24', 47'; Dubly 44'; Boyer 78'; Rouchez 87'	Stadium: Ilirija Field; Attendance: 4,000; Referee: Kerber (Austria)

=== Yugoslavia (1945–1991) ===
19 August 1956 Friendly	Slovenia (Socialist Republic of Slovenia)	5–2	China	Ljubljana, FPR Yugoslavia
	Kranjc 20'; Brezar 30', 70'; Cuban 31'; Dolenc 50'		Miao 52'; Ling 63'	Stadium: Centralni stadion ob Titovi cesti Attendance: 5,000

3 April 1968 Friendly	Austria	2–2	(Socialist Republic of Slovenia) Slovenia	Klagenfurt, Austria
	Parits 47'; Köglberger 78' (pen.)		Zagorc 37'; Pirc 83'	Attendance: 3,000; Referee: Fercher (Austria)

8 December 1990 Friendly	Slovenia (Socialist Republic of Slovenia)	2–0	(Socialist Republic of Bosnia and Herzegovina) Bosnia and Herzegovina	Izola, SFR Yugoslavia
15:00	Vidovič 82'; Cvikl 84'	Report		Stadium: Izola City Stadium; Attendance: 1,000; Referee: Velimir Burič (Slovenia)

21 February 1991 Friendly	Udinese	3–0	(Socialist Republic of Slovenia) Slovenia	Fagagna, Italy
	De Vitis 5'; Dell'Anno 32'; Pagano 82'	Report		Referee: Daneluzzi (Italy)

13 March 1991 Friendly	Slovenia (Socialist Republic of Slovenia)	1–1	Udinese	Koper, SFR Yugoslavia
	Vidovič 58'	Report	De Vitis 17'	Stadium: Bonifika; Referee: Miroljub Avsec (Slovenia)

11 June 1991 Friendly	Slovenia (Socialist Republic of Slovenia)	3–0	Zasavje	Trbovlje, SFR Yugoslavia
	Čeh 39'; Galič 58'; Cvikl 65'	Report		Stadium: Rudar Stadium

19 June 1991 Friendly	Slovenia (Socialist Republic of Slovenia)	0–1	(Socialist Republic of Croatia) Croatia	Murska Sobota, SFR Yugoslavia
17:30		Report	Komljenović 65'	Stadium: Fazanerija City Stadium; Attendance: 4,000; Referee: Igor Bučar (Slovenia)

=== Republic of Slovenia (1991–present) ===
23 October 1991 Friendly	ZTE	0–4	Slovenia	Zalaegerszeg, Hungary
		Report	Jermaniš 42'; Gliha 53', 86'; Cvikl 75'

16 November 1993 Friendly	Slovakia	2–0	Slovenia	Prievidza, Slovakia
17:00	Faktor 34'; Luhový 58'	Report		Stadium: Futbalový štadión Prievidza; Attendance: 14,000; Referee: Václav Krondl (Czech Republic)

5 February 1994 Friendly	Izola	0–2	Slovenia	Izola, Slovenia
15:00		Report	Gliha 11'; Jermaniš 52'	Stadium: Izola City Stadium; Attendance: 300; Referee: Žarko Vidali (Slovenia)

8 February 1995 Friendly	Izola	0–2	Slovenia	Izola, Slovenia
15:00			Florjančič 25'; Gliha 32'	Stadium: Izola City Stadium; Attendance: 200; Referee: Damjan Mihalič (Slovenia)

11 February 1995 Friendly	Slovenia	1–4	Železničar	Koper, Slovenia
15:30	Gliha 20'	Report	Miškić 5'; Vončina 28'; Prelogar 55'; Šporar 90'	Stadium: Bonifika; Referee: Božo Tabar (Slovenia)

12 February 1995 Friendly	Slovenia	1–0	Koper	Koper, Slovenia
13:30	Škaper 38'	Report		Stadium: Bonifika; Referee: Maks Turščak (Slovenia)

29 November 1995 Friendly	Mexico U23	5–2	Slovenia	Celaya, Mexico
20:00	Padilla 2', 16'; Garcia Luis 68', 84'	Report	Jermaniš 36'; Blatnik 90'

2 December 1995 Friendly	Mexico U23	3–0	Slovenia	Mexico City, Mexico
15:00	Banos 22', 33'; Moreno 24'	Report		Stadium: Estadio Azteca
