= Mujanović =

Mujanović is a Bosnian surname. Notable people with the surname include:

- Alen Mujanovič (born 1976), Slovenian footballer
- Goran Mujanović (born 1983), Croatian footballer
- Razija Mujanović (born 1967), Bosnian basketball player
