= Franc Fridl =

Slovenian footballer

Personal information
- Date of birth: 22 July 1972 (age 54)
- Place of birth: Ptuj, SFR Yugoslavia
- Height: 1.72 m (5 ft 8 in)
- Position: Midfielder

Youth career
- –1991: Maribor

Senior career*
Years	Team	Apps	(Gls)
1991–1992	Maribor	22	(0)
1993–1995	Aluminij		
1995–1998	Maribor	68	(2)
1999	Beltinci	16	(1)
1999–2002	Olimpija	82	(1)
2002	Ljubljana	10	(1)
2003–2005	Mura	52	(9)
2005–2006	SVU Gleinstätten	28	(6)
2006–2007	SVU Oberhaag	21	(15)
2008	USC Jagerberg	9	(5)
2008–2009	Zavrč		
2010	Drava Ptuj	3	(0)
2010–2012	Zavrč		
2012–2013	Drava Ptuj		
2013–2014	Skorba		

Managerial career
- Drava Ptuj
- 2016: Mura
- 2017–2019: Nafta 1903
- 2020–2021: Rogaška
- 2022: Drava Ptuj
- 2022–2023: Bistrica
- * Club domestic league appearances and goals

Franc Fridl (born 22 July 1972) is a Slovenian football manager and former player. He spent most of his career playing for Maribor in the Slovenian PrvaLiga. He also played for Olimpija.

== Honours ==
Maribor

- Slovenian Championship: 1996–97, 1997–98, 1998–99
- Slovenian Cup: 1991–92, 1996–97, 1998–99

Olimpija

- Slovenian Cup: 1999–2000

Zavrč

- Slovenian Third League: 2011–12
- Slovenian Fourth Division: 2010–11
- Slovenian Fifth Division: 2009–10
- Slovenian Sixth Division: 2008–09

Drava Ptuj

- Slovenian Fourth Division: 2012–13
