= Hasanagić =

Hasanagić (Serbian Cyrillic: Хасанагић) is a surname. Notable people with the surname include:

- Dragan Hasanagić (born 1965), Slovenian footballer
- Mustafa Hasanagić (1941–2023), Serbian footballer and manager
