= Marko Simeunovič =

Slovenian footballer (born 1967)

Personal information
- Full name: Marko Simeunovič
- Date of birth: 6 December 1967 (age 58)
- Place of birth: Maribor, SFR Yugoslavia
- Height: 1.90 m (6 ft 3 in)
- Position: Goalkeeper

Youth career
- Maribor

Senior career*
Years	Team	Apps	(Gls)
1983–1989	Maribor	40	(0)
1989–1991	Red Star Belgrade	0	(0)
1990–1991	→ Napredak Kruševac (dual)	30	(0)
1991–1996	Olimpija Ljubljana	104	(0)
1996–1997	Maribor	35	(0)
1997–1999	Şekerspor	22	(0)
1999–2002	Maribor	68	(0)
2002–2005	Olympiakos Nicosia	42	(0)
2005–2006	AEL Limassol	8	(0)
2006–2007	Interblock	13	(0)
Total		362	(0)

International career
1992–2004	Slovenia	57	(0)
- * Club domestic league appearances and goals

Marko Simeunovič (born 6 December 1967) is a former Slovenian footballer who played as a goalkeeper. He represented his country at two major tournaments, Euro 2000 and the 2002 FIFA World Cup.

== Club career ==
He started his football career at his home club NK Maribor. As a youngster he moved to Red Star Belgrade, where he didn't get opportunity. After being a substitute against Bayern Munich in semi-final second leg of the 1990–91 European Cup, he moved to Olimpija Ljubljana. He won four consecutive Slovenian Championships and two Slovenian Cups in Ljubljana. In season 1996–97 he won double (Championship and Cup) with NK Maribor. After a short spell at Şekerspor he won three consecutive Slovenian Championships with Maribor. Later, he played for Olympiakos Nicosia, AEL Limassol and Interblock.

Simeunovič holds the record for the most expensive 38-year-old player of all time.

== International career ==
Simeunovič was capped 57 times for Slovenia and was a participant at the Euro 2000 and World Cup 2002. He made his international debut on 3 June 1992 in the first official international match of Slovenia, a 1–1 international friendly with Estonia in Tallinn.

== Personal life ==
He is the son of former NK Maribor player and coach, Vojislav Simeunović.

== Honours ==
Olimpija Ljubljana

- Slovenian Championship: 1991–92, 1992–93, 1993–94, 1994–95
- Slovenian Cup: 1992–93, 1995–96

Maribor

- Slovenian Championship: 1996–97, 1999–2000, 2000–01, 2001–02
- Slovenian Cup: 1996–97
