= Janez Zavrl =

Janez Zavrl may refer to:

- Janez Zavrl (football manager), Slovenian football coach
- Janez Zavrl (footballer) (born 1982), Slovenian football player
