= Janez Zavrl (football manager) =

Slovenian association football coach

Janez Zavrl is a Slovenian association football coach. During his career he has coached Slovenian clubs, including NK Maribor and NK Celje. As a head coach of Celje he led the team towards the finals of the 1994–95 Slovenian Football Cup where Celje was defeated 2–1 aggregate against NK Mura.
