= Roland Njume Ntoko =

Cameroonian footballer

Roland Ntoko
Personal information
- Full name: Roland Njume Ntoko
- Date of birth: November 30, 1972 (age 53)
- Place of birth: Cameroon
- Height: 1.81 m (5 ft 11 in)
- Position: Forward

Senior career*
Years	Team	Apps	(Gls)
1993–1994	Elan 1922	14	(4)
1994–1995	Celje	26	(5)
1995–1996	Olimpija	17	(1)
1996–1997	Darmstadt 98	16	(2)
1997–1998	Greuther Fürth	0	(0)
2000	Korotan Prevalje	2	(0)

International career
1991–1996	Cameroon	9	(1)
- * Club domestic league appearances and goals

Roland Njume Ntoko (born November 30, 1972) is a Cameroonian former professional footballer who played as a forward.

He was a Cameroon national football team player and participated in the 1996 African Cup of Nations.

He spent most of his career in Slovenia and Germany.
