= Aleš Kačičnik =

Slovenian footballer

Personal information
- Date of birth: 28 September 1973 (age 53)
- Place of birth: SFR Yugoslavia
- Position: Defender

Senior career*
Years	Team	Apps	(Gls)
1992–1993	Celje	16	(0)
1998–2000	Celje	63	(5)
2000–2001	Maribor	28	(2)
2001–2002	Šmartno ob Paki	19	(0)
2002–2003	Dravograd	19	(0)
2003–2006	Domžale	70	(1)
2006–2008	1. FC Vöcklabruck	48	(1)
2008–2011	Celje	71	(0)
2011–2013	WSG Brückl	45	(3)
Total		379	(12)

Managerial career
- 2021: Rogaška
- 2024–2025: Fužinar
- 2025–2026: Krka
- * Club domestic league appearances and goals

Aleš Kačičnik (born 28 September 1973) is a Slovenian retired footballer who played as a defender. In his career, he scored 8 goals in 286 Slovenian First League appearances.
