= Panče Georgievski =

Macedonian footballer

Personal information
- Date of birth: 29 June 1973 (age 53)
- Place of birth: Skopje, SFR Yugoslavia
- Position: Forward

Youth career
- 1987–1992: Vardar

Senior career*
| Years | Team | Apps | (Gls) |
| 1992–1998 | Vardar | 45 | (16) |
| 1998–1999 | Publikum Celje | 11 | (3) |
| 1999–2000 | Čukarički | 10 | (1) |
| 2000–2002 | Felgueiras | 41 | (13) |
| 2002–2003 | Vilaverdense | 22 | (18) |
| 2003–2004 | Portimonense | 9 | (1) |
| 2004–2005 | Vilaverdense | 5 | (1) |
| 2005–2006 | Esperança Lagos | 15 | (10) |
| 2008–2009 | Guia | | |
| 2011–2012 | Alvorense | | |

International career
- Macedonia U-21
- * Club domestic league appearances and goals

Panče Georgievski (born 29 June 1973) is a retired Macedonian footballer who made his career in North Macedonia, Slovenia, Serbia and Portugal.

== Club career ==
Born in Skopje, SR Macedonia, SFR Yugoslavia, he played with FK Vardar until 1998 when he first moved abroad. That year he signed with Publikum Celje and played in the Slovenian First League. In the next season he joined FK Čukarički and played in the First League of FR Yugoslavia. In 2000, he moved to Portugal and played 2 seasons with FC Felgueiras in the Portuguese Second League. Later he continued his career in Portugal and played with Vilaverdense FC, Portimonense SC, Esperança Lagos, Guia and Alvorense.

== International career ==
At international level, Georgievski played for Macedonia U-21.

== Honours ==
Vardar

- Macedonian First League (3): 1992–93, 1993–94, 1994–95
- Macedonian Cup: 1993, 1995, 1998
