= Vojislav Simeunović =

Serbian footballer and coach

Personal information
- Full name: Vojislav Simeunović
- Date of birth: 8 August 1942 (age 84)
- Place of birth: Šabac, Nazi-occupied Serbia
- Position: Defender

Senior career*
Years	Team	Apps	(Gls)
1964–1965	Partizan	1	(0)
1965–1972	Maribor	201	(0)

Managerial career
- 1976-1979: Maribor
- 1981-1984: Maribor
- 1987-1989: Maribor
- Železničar Maribor
- Beltinci
- 2002–2003: Mura
- 2005: Maribor
- Malečnik
- * Club domestic league appearances and goals

Vojislav Simeunović (Serbian Cyrillic: Војислав Симеуновић; born 8 August 1942) is a Serbian football coach and former player.

His son Marko is a former Slovenian national team goalkeeper.
