= Damir Vrabac =

Bosnia and Herzegovina footballer

Personal information
- Full name: Damir Vrabac
- Date of birth: May 10, 1962 (age 64)
- Place of birth: Velika Kladuša, SFR Yugoslavia
- Position: Midfielder

Senior career*
Years	Team	Apps	(Gls)
1982–1983	Sarajevo	1	(0)
1984–1986	Iskra Bugojno	45	(13)
1988–1995	Olimpija	189	(33)
1995–1996	Izola	5	(0)
1997–1998	Vevče	10	(0)
Total		250	(46)

Managerial career
- Kamnik
- 2016–2017: Svoboda Ljubljana
- 2017: Olimpija Ljubljana (women's)
- 2018: Svoboda Ljubljana
- * Club domestic league appearances and goals

Damir Vrabac (born 10 May 1962) is a Bosnian retired football player who played as a midfielder for several Bosnian and Slovenian clubs during the 1980s and 1990s. His brother Dinko Vrabac is also a football player.
