= Zvezdan Ljubobratović =

Croatian footballer (born 1971)

Personal information
- Full name: Zvezdan Savo Ljubobratović
- Date of birth: 27 May 1971 (age 55)
- Place of birth: Bjelovar, SR Croatia, SFR Yugoslavia
- Height: 1.78 m (5 ft 10 in)
- Position: Forward

Senior career*
Years	Team	Apps	(Gls)
1989–1992	Bjelovar		
1992–1993	Real Betis B		
1993	Hércules		
1993–1994	Bjelovar		
1995	Pazinka		
1995–1997	Maribor Branik	50	(15)
1997–1998	Sint-Truiden	21	(2)
1998–1999	Šibenik	0	(0)
1999–2000	Bjelovar		
2000–2001	Šibenik	14	(1)
2001	Rubin Kazan	22	(9)
2002–2005	Bjelovar		
- * Club domestic league appearances and goals

Zvezdan Savo Ljubobratović (born 27 May 1971) is a retired Croatian footballer.

== Club career ==
He played two games and scored a goal in the 1997–98 UEFA Cup for Maribor against Ajax.
