= Nihad Pejković =

Bosnia and Herzegovina footballer

Personal information
- Date of birth: 23 October 1968 (age 58)
- Position: Goalkeeper

Senior career*
Years	Team	Apps	(Gls)
1991–2002	Olimpija	280	(7)
2002	NK Ljubljana	17	(0)
2003	Ivančna Gorica	12	(0)
2003–2004	Mura	24	(0)
2004–2006	Ptolemaida	41	(0)
2006	Kastoria	4	(0)

International career
1998–1999	Bosnia and Herzegovina	2	(0)

Managerial career
- 2007-2018: Slovenia (goalkeeping coach)
- 2014–2016: NK Krka (goalkeeping coach)
- 2016–2017: SV Horn (goalkeeping coach)
- 2017: SV Horn (caretaker)
- 2018–2021: Iraq (goalkeeping coach)
- 2021–: Uzbekistan (goalkeeping coach)
- * Club domestic league appearances and goals

Nihad Pejković (born 23 October 1968) is a Bosnian retired football goalkeeper.

== International career ==
Pejković made his debut for Bosnia and Herzegovina in a June 1998 friendly match away against Macedonia and earned a total of 2 caps. His second and final international was a January 1999 friendly away against Malta.
