= Oskar Drobne =

Slovenian footballer and manager (born 1975)

Personal information
- Date of birth: 6 February 1975 (age 51)
- Place of birth: Celje, SFR Yugoslavia
- Height: 1.74 m (5 ft 9 in)
- Position: Forward

Team information
- Current team: Krka (head coach)

Youth career
- 1981–1995: Šentjur

Senior career*
Years	Team	Apps	(Gls)
1995–1996	Šentjur		
1996–1998	Maribor	56	(18)
1998–1999	FC St. Pauli	2	(0)
1999–2000	Gorica	3	(0)
1999–2000	→ Domžale (loan)	22	(23)
2000–2002	Varteks	49	(16)
2002–2003	Dravograd	23	(12)
2003	Doxa Katokopia		
2004	Domžale	17	(7)
2005	Celje	22	(4)
2005–2007	Koper	42	(23)
2007–2009	MU Šentjur		
2009–2013	Kovinar Štore		

International career
1996–1997	Slovenia U21	4	(1)

Managerial career
- 2013–2014: Šmartno 1928
- 2014–2017: Mons Claudius
- 2017–2019: Šampion
- 2019–2020: Radomlje
- 2020–2022: Aluminij
- 2022–2024: Rogaška
- 2024–2025: Mura
- 2025: Brežice 1919
- 2025–2026: Rogaška
- 2026–: Krka
- * Club domestic league appearances and goals

Oskar Drobne (born 6 February 1975) is a Slovenian football manager and former player.

== Club career ==
Drobne played for Varteks in the Croatian Prva HNL during the 2000–01 and 2001–02 seasons. He had a brief spell with FC St. Pauli in the German 2. Bundesliga during the 1998–99 season.

== Managerial career ==
Drobne succeeded Slobodan Grubor as manager of Aluminij in late 2020, only to be dismissed by the club in March 2022.
