= Britof =

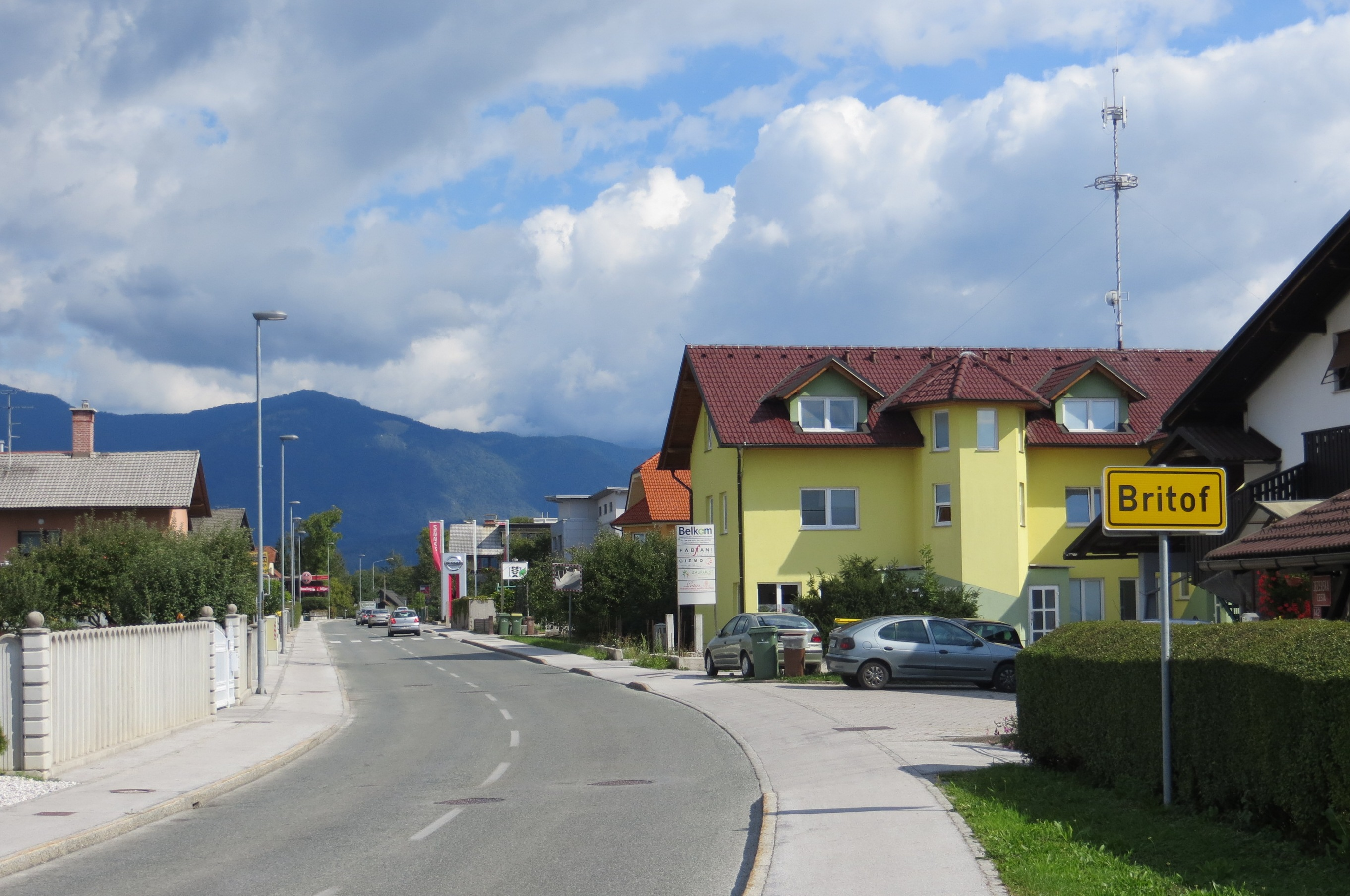

- Location in Slovenia
- Coordinates: 46°15′28.39″N 14°23′0.5″E
- Country: Slovenia
- Traditional region: Upper Carniola
- Statistical region: Upper Carniola
- Municipality: Kranj

Area
  - Land: 2.07 km^{2} (0.80 sq mi)
- Elevation: 407 m (1,335 ft)

Population (2002)
  - Total: 1,657

Britof (pronounced [ˈbɾiːtɔf]; German: Freithof) is a settlement just northeast of the town of Kranj in the Upper Carniola region of Slovenia.

== Name ==
The settlement was attested in written sources in 1387 as Vreytof (and as Freithoff in 1447). The Slovene common noun britof was borrowed from Middle High German vrîthof, both meaning 'cultivated fenced area'. The denotation of the common noun in both languages later developed from this original meaning to 'churchyard' and then to 'cemetery'. The settlement was known as Freithof in German in the past.

== History ==
A linseed oil and varnish factory, Zabret & Comp., was established in Britof in 1905. Before the Second World War it had its own electrical generator and processed 300 train cars of linseed per year, mostly imported from Argentina and India. The oil and varnish were sold in Yugoslavia, and the linseed pomace was exported to Austria and Germany. The factory had 30 workers in the 1930s; it developed further after the war, and employed 100 workers by the 1960s.

=== Mass grave ===
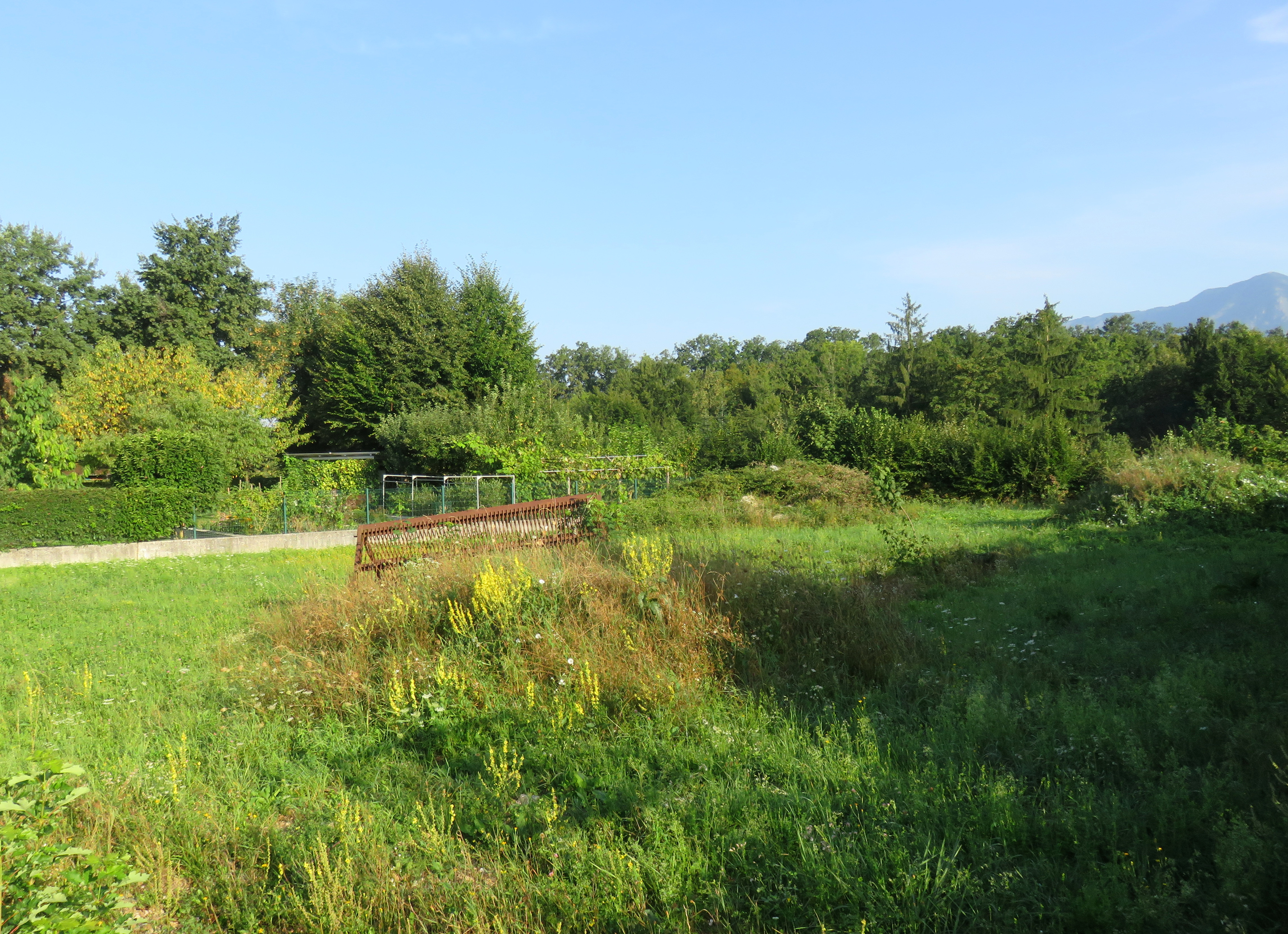
The Britof Mass Grave site

Britof is the site of a mass grave from the period immediately after the Second World War. The Britof Mass Grave (Slovene: Grobišče Britof) was located on the left bank of the Kokra River north of the settlement, in a meadow on the edge of the woods. It contained the remains of a civilian man and woman that were taken to the site by the Partisans in May or June 1945 and murdered. The victims' remains were exhumed in 1994.

== Church ==
The local church is dedicated to Saint Thomas. It dates to 1512 and was renovated in 1888. The presbytery contains late Gothic frescos and the altar dates to the 17th century.

== Gallery ==
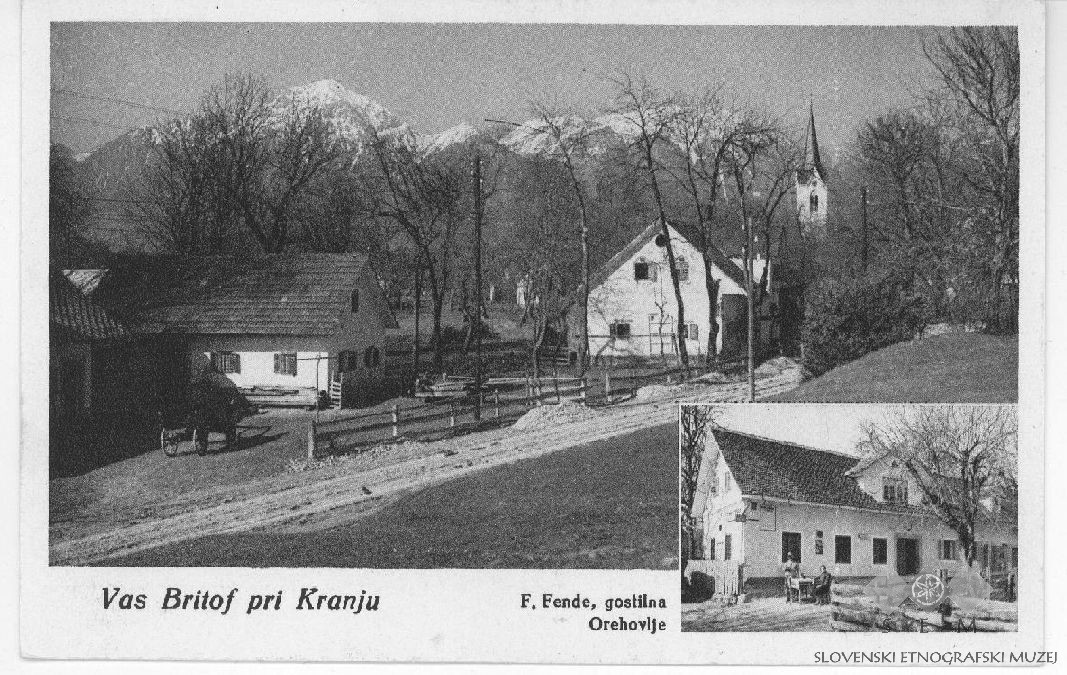
Historical postcard of Britof
