= Samo Vidovič =

Slovenian footballer

Personal information
- Date of birth: 24 September 1968 (age 58)
- Place of birth: Črna na Koroškem, SFR Yugoslavia
- Position: Forward

Senior career*
| Years | Team | Apps | (Gls) |
| 1989–1993 | Ljubljana | | |
| 1994–1996 | Korotan Prevalje | 63 | (17) |
| 1996–1997 | Rudar Velenje | 35 | (11) |
| 1997–1998 | Korotan Prevalje | 18 | (4) |
| 1998–1999 | Domžale | 7 | (1) |
| 1999–2001 | Dravograd | 60 | (19) |
| 2001–2003 | Celje | 44 | (7) |
| 2003–2005 | SAK Klagenfurt | | |
| 2006 | DSG Sele/Zell | | |
| 2006–2007 | SAK Klagenfurt | | |
| 2007–2008 | DSG Sele/Zell | | |
| 2008–2012 | Eberndorfer AC | | |
| 2012–2013 | DSG Sele/Zell | | |
| 2013–2015 | Eberndorfer AC | | |
- * Club domestic league appearances and goals

Samo Vidovič (born 24 September 1968) is a Slovenian retired footballer who played as a forward. He made one appearance for the unofficial Slovenian national team in June 1991 against Croatia, prior Slovenia gained admission to FIFA.
