= Ermin Šiljak =

Slovenian footballer

Personal information
- Date of birth: 11 May 1973 (age 53)
- Place of birth: Ljubljana, SFR Yugoslavia
- Position: Centre forward

Youth career
- Ilirija

Senior career*
Years	Team	Apps	(Gls)
1992–1993	Svoboda	40	(16)
1994–1996	Olimpija	78	(58)
1996–1998	Bastia	35	(15)
1998–2001	Servette	39	(13)
2001	Hammarby	8	(0)
2002–2003	Panionios	37	(13)
2004–2005	Dalian Shide	35	(18)
2005–2006	Mouscron	19	(7)
Total		278	(135)

International career
1992–1995	Slovenia U21	14	(10)
1994–2005	Slovenia	48	(14)
2003	Slovenia B	2	(1)

Managerial career
- 2012: Olimpija Ljubljana
- 2015: Botev Plovdiv
- 2016: Dalian Transcendence
- 2017: Baoding Yingli (Assistant Coach)
- 2023: Aris Saloniki
- * Club domestic league appearances and goals

Ermin Šiljak (born 11 May 1973) is a Slovenian professional football manager and former player who played as a centre forward.

== International career ==
Šiljak made his debut for Slovenia in a March 1994 away friendly match against Macedonia. By the end of his career, he had earned a total of 48 caps for the national team and scored14 goals. He played at the Euro 2000, and scored nine goals in nine games in the UEFA Euro 2004 qualifying campaign. His final international was an October 2005 World Cup qualification match against Scotland.

== Managerial career ==
=== Early career ===
Between 2007 and 2011, Šiljak managed Slovenian under-16 and under-19 national teams.

In 2012, he was announced as the new manager of Olimpija Ljubljana.

=== Botev Plovdiv ===
Šiljak joined Botev Plovdiv in July 2015. His first match in charge was against local rivals Lokomotiv Plovdiv. The Plovdiv derby ended in a 1–1 draw.

Šiljak achieved five wins and three draws in his first thirteen games as a manager of Botev. On 27 October 2015, Botev was eliminated in the Round of 16 of the Bulgarian Cup. At that point, Šiljak decided to expel Yordan Hristov, Mariyan Ognyanov, Plamen Nikolov, and Joël Tshibamba from the first team, but these changes did not lead to better results. Šiljak relied on young players in the next two league mathes and lost both. At the end of November 2015, after less than six months in charge, Šiljak resigned as the manager of Botev Plovdiv.

=== Dalian Transcendence ===
On 21 April 2016, China League One club Dalian Transcendence announced Ermin Šiljak would be their manager for the following two years. On 10 August 2016, however, Šiljak was sacked by the club, after only 112 days in charge, and 5 wins and 4 draws in 15 games.

=== Baoding Yingli ===
In May 2017, Šiljak joined the China League One club Baoding Yingli as an assistant coach to Jo Bonfrere. Seven games before the end of the season, the owners sacked the whole coaching team (including Šiljak) without an official explanation.

=== Aris Thessaloniki ===
On 29 April 2023, Ermin Šiljak was hired as the head coach at Greek Super League club Aris Thessaloniki, with a specific goal to secure a spot in one of the European competitions in the following season. He signed a two-month contract, until 30 June 2023. Under his management, two rounds before the end of the season, the club successfully secured a spot in the 2023–24 UEFA Europa Conference League second qualifying round. Despite this success, club owners decided not to extend Šiljak's contract and decided to replace him with Apostolos Terzis.

== Career statistics ==
Scores and results list Slovenia's goal tally first.

#	Date	Venue	Opponent	Score	Result	Competition
1	6 December 1995	Estadio Héroe de Nacozari, Hermosillo	Mexico	1–2	1–2	Friendly match
2	7 February 1996	Ta'Qali Stadium, Valletta	Iceland	7–1	7–1	Friendly match
3	21 May 1996	Stadion Bežigrad, Ljubljana	United Arab Emirates	1–2	2–2	Friendly match
4	18 March 1997	Linzer Stadion, Linz	Austria	2–0	2–0	Friendly match
5	11 November 2000	Stadion Bežigrad, Ljubljana	Switzerland	1–1	2–2	FIFA World Cup 2002 qualification
6	7 September 2002	Stadion Bežigrad, Ljubljana	Malta	2–0	3–0	UEFA Euro 2004 qualification
7	2 April 2003	Stadion Bežigrad, Ljubljana	Cyprus	1–0	4–1	UEFA Euro 2004 qualification
8	2 April 2003	Stadion Bežigrad, Ljubljana	Cyprus	2–1	4–1	UEFA Euro 2004 qualification
9	30 April 2003	Ta'Qali Stadium, Valletta	Malta	2–0	3–1	UEFA Euro 2004 qualification
10	30 April 2003	Ta'Qali Stadium, Valletta	Malta	3–0	3–1	UEFA Euro 2004 qualification
11	6 September 2003	Stadion Bežigrad, Ljubljana	Israel	1–0	3–1	UEFA Euro 2004 qualification
12	11 October 2003	Tsirion, Limassol	Cyprus	1–0	2–2	UEFA Euro 2004 qualification
13	11 October 2003	Tsirion, Limassol	Cyprus	2–0	2–2	UEFA Euro 2004 qualification
14	15 November 2003	Maksimir, Zagreb	Croatia	1–1	1–1	UEFA Euro 2004 Play-offs

== Honours ==
Olimpija Ljubljana

- Prva liga: 1993–94, 1994–95; runner-up: 1995–96
- Slovenian Cup: 1995–96
- Slovenian Super Cup: 1995

Bastia

- Intertoto Cup: 1997

Servette

- National League A: 1998–99
- Swiss Cup: 2001

Hammarby IF

- Allsvenskan: 2001

Dalian Shide

- Chinese FA Cup: runner-up 2003

Mouscron

- Belgian Cup: runner-up 2005–06

Individual

- Slovenian PrvaLiga top scorer: 1995–96 (28 goals in 33 games)
- UEFA Euro 2004 qualifying top scorer (9 goals in 9 games)
