= Marijan Bakula =

Bosnian-Herzegovinian footballer

Personal information
- Full name: Marijan Bakula
- Date of birth: 17 April 1966 (age 60)
- Place of birth: Žepče, SFR Yugoslavia
- Position: Midfielder

Senior career*
Years	Team	Apps	(Gls)
1988–1991	Čelik Zenica	40	(5)
1991–1993	Maribor	64	(14)
1993–1996	Mura	99	(9)
1997–1998	Zadar	42	(5)
1998–2000	Šibenik	70	(1)
2001	Mura	16	(1)
2002	Kamen Ingrad	9	(1)
2003–2004	Železničar Maribor	11	(1)
Total		351	(37)
- * Club domestic league appearances and goals

Marijan Bakula (born 17 April 1966 in Žepče, SFR Yugoslavia) is a Bosnian-Herzegovinian retired football player.

== Club career ==
On the club level, he played for several Croatian, Bosnian and Slovenian clubs.
