= Dragan Hasanagić =

Slovenian footballer

Personal information
- Full name: Dragan Hasanagić
- Date of birth: 23 March 1965 (age 61)
- Place of birth: Vrbas, SFR Yugoslavia
- Position: Defender

Youth career
- Olimpija

Senior career*
Years	Team	Apps	(Gls)
1983–1988	Slovan		
1988–1994	Ljubljana		
1994	Kočevje	4	(0)
1994–1995	Vevče	21	(1)
1995–1996	Železničar Ljubljana	24	(1)
1996–1998	Vevče		
1998–2000	Elan		
2002	Vrhnika	5	(2)
2005–2006	Bežigrad		
- * Club domestic league appearances and goals

Dragan Hasanagić (born 23 March 1965) is a Slovenian retired footballer.
