= Alojz Fricelj =

Slovenian footballer

Personal information
- Date of birth: 9 October 1963 (age 63)
- Position: Midfielder

Senior career*
Years	Team	Apps	(Gls)
1982–1985	Maribor		
1985–1995	SVL Flavia Solva		
1995–1997	Maribor	78	(9)
1998–1999	Flavia Solva		

Managerial career
- 2016: SVU Gleinstätten
- 2016-: GASV Fortuna Pölfing-Brunn
- * Club domestic league appearances and goals

Alojz Fricelj (born 9 October 1963) is a Slovenian retired football midfielder.
