= Alen Mujanovič =

Slovenian footballer

Personal information
- Date of birth: 11 November 1976 (age 49)
- Place of birth: SFR Yugoslavia
- Position: Striker

Senior career*
Years	Team	Apps	(Gls)
1993–1997	Rudar Velenje	20	(0)
1999–2000	Primorje	12	(1)
2000–2003	Rudar Velenje	73	(25)
2003	Šmartno		
2004–2005	Maribor		
2005–2006	SV Flavia Solva	24	(12)
2006	SV Gleinstätten	13	(9)
2007–2009	Rudar Velenje	42	(22)
2009–2011	Šmartno 1928	39	(36)
Total		264	(123)

International career
1994	Slovenia U18	2	(0)
- * Club domestic league appearances and goals

Alen Mujanovič (born 11 November 1976) is a Slovenian retired footballer.
