= Mikhail Khlebalin =

Russian footballer

Personal information
- Full name: Mikhail Yuryevich Khlebalin
- Date of birth: 16 April 1970 (age 56)
- Height: 1.81 m (5 ft 11 1/2 in)
- Position: Forward

Senior career*
| Years | Team | Apps | (Gls) |
| 1987 | FC Torpedo Moscow | 0 | (0) |
| 1990–1992 | FC Torgmash Lyubertsy | 81 | (35) |
| 1993 | FC Viktor-Avangard Kolomna | 30 | (7) |
| 1995–1996 | NK Mura Murska Sobota | 31 | (13) |
| 1996–1999 | NK Varteks | 14 | (1) |
| 1999–2000 | FC Lotto-MKM Moscow | 33 | (3) |
- * Club domestic league appearances and goals

Mikhail Yuryevich Khlebalin (Russian: Михаил Юрьевич Хлебалин; born 16 April 1970) is a retired Russian professional footballer.

== Football career ==
Khlebalin made 37 appearances in the 1991 Soviet Second League with Torpedo Lyubertsy.

Khlebalin made 14 appearances and scored one goal in the Croatian First Football League in the seasons 1996–97 and 1998–99 with NK Varteks.
