= Marjan Dominko =

Slovenian footballer

Personal information
- Full name: Marjan Dominko
- Date of birth: 3 September 1969 (age 57)
- Place of birth: SFR Yugoslavia
- Height: 1.86 m (6 ft 1 in)
- Positions: Defender; striker

Senior career*
Years	Team	Apps	(Gls)
1994–2003	Mura	180	(23)
2003–2007	Nafta	65	(32)
Total		245	(55)

International career
1998–1999	Slovenia	4	(0)
- * Club domestic league appearances and goals

Marjan Dominko (born 3 September 1969) is a Slovenian retired footballer. He was named sports director at Nafta Lendava in 2009.

== International career ==
Dominko made his debut for Slovenia in an August 1998 friendly match away against Hungary, coming on as a 74th-minute substitute for Alfred Jermaniš, and earned a total of 4 caps, scoring no goals. His final international was an April 1999 friendly against Finland.
