= Simon Sešlar =

Slovenian footballer and manager

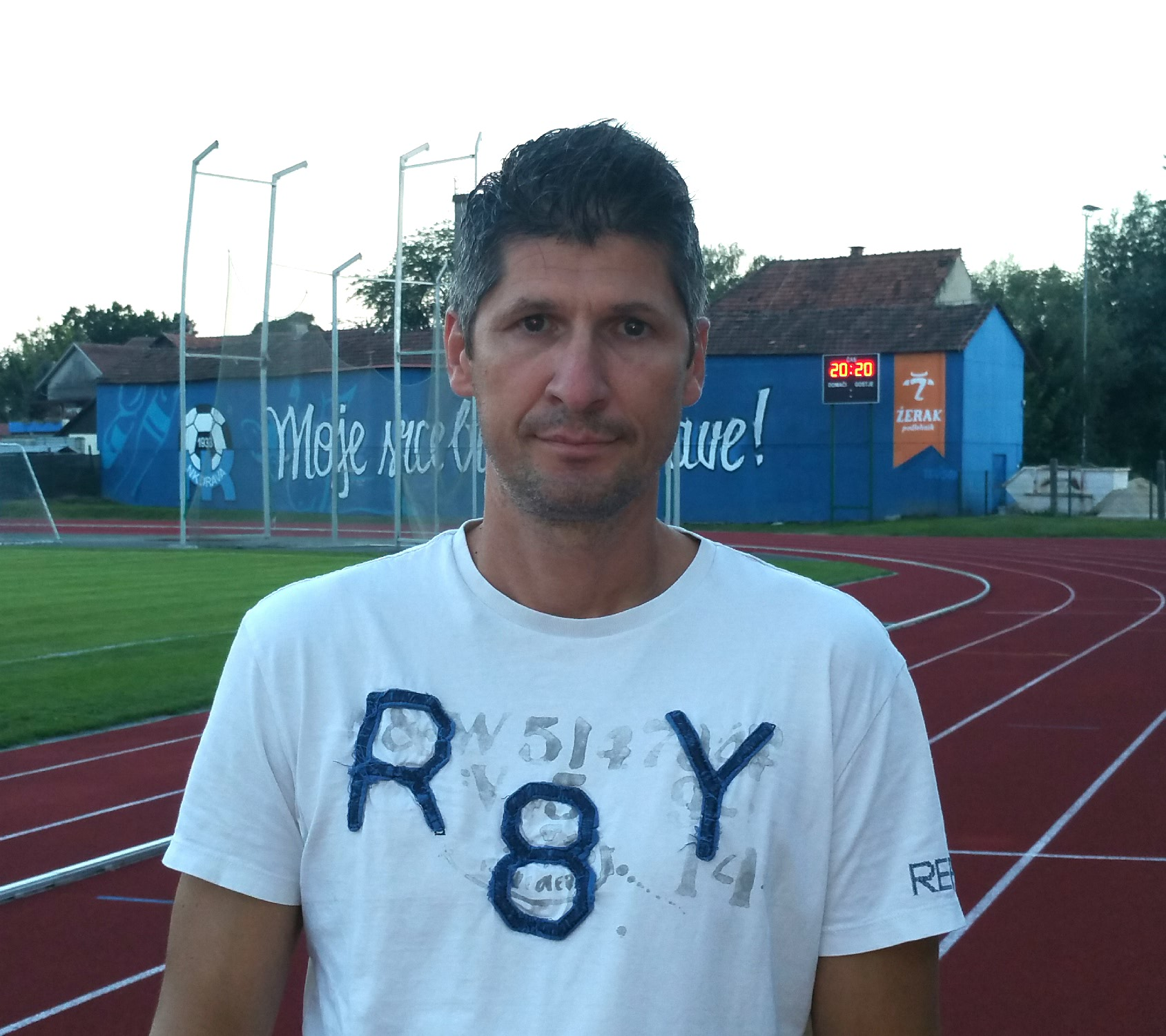

Personal information
- Date of birth: 5 April 1974 (age 52)
- Place of birth: Celje, SFR Yugoslavia
- Height: 1.88 m (6 ft 2 in)
- Position: Midfielder

Youth career
- Celje

Senior career*
Years	Team	Apps	(Gls)
1991–1998	Celje	182	(14)
1998–1999	SSV Ulm	17	(1)
1999–2001	Maribor	73	(6)
2001–2002	Lierse	9	(1)
2002–2005	Celje	91	(15)
2005–2006	Hapoel Nazareth Illit	9	(2)
2006	AEL Limassol	6	(0)
2006–2007	TSV Hartberg	4	(0)
2007–2009	Celje	58	(3)
2009	MU Šentjur	10	(0)
Total		459	(42)

International career
1993–1995	Slovenia U21	10	(1)
1997–2005	Slovenia	19	(0)

Managerial career
- 2013–2015: Dravinja
- 2015–2016: Aluminij
- 2016–2018: Drava Ptuj
- 2019–2020: Brežice 1919
- 2020: Dob
- 2021: Celje
- 2023–2024: Rudar Velenje
- * Club domestic league appearances and goals

Simon Sešlar (born 5 April 1974) is a Slovenian football manager and former player who played as a midfielder.

== Career ==
Sešlar made his debut for Slovenia in a March 1997 friendly match away against Austria, coming on as a 59th-minute substitute for Sašo Udovič, and was capped 19 times for the team between 1997 and 2005.

== Personal life ==
His son, Svit, is also a professional footballer.
