= Faik Kamberović =

Bosnian footballer

Personal information
- Date of birth: 25 July 1967 (age 59)
- Place of birth: SFR Yugoslavia
- Height: 1.80 m (5 ft 11 in)
- Position: Forward

Senior career*
Years	Team	Apps	(Gls)
1994–1995	Zmaj od Bosne		
1995–1998	Publikum Celje	94	(62)
1998–1999	Varteks	33	(8)
2000	Korotan	9	(5)
2000–2002	SC Eisenstadt		
2002–2003	First Vienna		
2003–2005	Budućnost Banovići		
- * Club domestic league appearances and goals

Faik Kamberović (born 25 July 1967) is a retired Bosnian footballer who played as a forward for several clubs in Slovenia, Croatia, and Austria.

== Club career ==
He was the top scorer in Slovenian PrvaLiga in the 1997–98 season. He scored three goals for Croatian side Varteks Varaždin in the 1998–99 UEFA Cup Winners' Cup in which the team reached the quarter-finals. He then played at clubs in Austrian lower leagues, and ended his professional career in his homeland, at Budućnost Banovići.
