= Mihael Vončina =

Slovenian footballer

Personal information
- Full name: Mihael Vončina
- Date of birth: 25 February 1969 (age 57)
- Place of birth: SFR Yugoslavia
- Position: Forward

Senior career*
Years	Team	Apps	(Gls)
1988–1991	Olimpija	19	(1)
1991–1993	First Vienna	10	(0)
1993–1995	Ljubljana	43	(12)
1995–1996	Primorje	30	(14)
1996–1997	Korotan Prevalje	0	(0)
2000	Domžale	1	(0)
2000	Ljubljana	7	(0)
2000	Elan Novo Mesto	3	(2)
2001	Tabor Sežana	12	(0)
2001–2003	Livar	32	(13)
Total		157	(42)

International career
1995	Slovenia	1	(0)
- * Club domestic league appearances and goals

Mihael Vončina (born 25 February 1969 in SFR Yugoslavia) is a Slovenian retired footballer.

== International career ==
Vončina was capped once by Slovenia, in a December 1995 friendly match away against Mexico.
