= Damjan Gajser =

Slovenian footballer and manager (born 1970)

Personal information
- Date of birth: 8 May 1970 (age 56)
- Place of birth: SFR Yugoslavia
- Position: Midfielder

Team information
- Current team: Rudar Velenje (head coach)

Youth career
- Auminij

Senior career*
Years	Team	Apps	(Gls)
1992–1994	Slovan	49	(10)
1994–1996	Mura	52	(3)
1996	Olimpija	16	(4)
1996–1999	Maribor	43	(12)
1999–2000	Rudar Velenje	27	(8)
2000–2001	Mura	21	(3)
2001	Zadar	10	(2)
2002	Primorje	2	(0)
2002–2004	DSV Leoben	45	(4)
Total		265	(46)

International career
1995–1997	Slovenia	11	(0)

Managerial career
- 2017–2020: Mura (assistant)
- 2020: Triglav Kranj
- 2021–2024: Beltinci
- 2026–: Rudar Velenje
- * Club domestic league appearances and goals

Damjan Gajser (born 8 May 1970) is a Slovenian football manager and former player.

== International career ==
Gajser made his debut for Slovenia on 6 December 1995 against Mexico, and earned a total of 11 caps.
