= Matjaž Cvikl =

Slovenian footballer (1967-1999)

Personal information
- Full name: Matjaž Cvikl
- Date of birth: 13 January 1967
- Place of birth: Slovenj Gradec, SFR Yugoslavia
- Date of death: 27 July 1999 (aged 32)
- Place of death: Ljubljana, Slovenia
- Position: Forward

Senior career*
Years	Team	Apps	(Gls)
1989–1993	Rudar Velenje		
1991	→ Maribor (loan)	14	(7)
1993–1995	Zeytinburnuspor	48	(17)
1995–1996	Rudar Velenje	32	(10)
1996–1997	Beltinci	22	(2)
1997–1998	Maribor Teatanic	7	(3)

International career
1992–1995	Slovenia	6	(0)
- * Club domestic league appearances and goals

Matjaž Cvikl (13 January 1967 – 27 July 1999) was a Slovenian footballer who played as a forward.

== Club career ==
Born in Slovenj Gradec, Cvikl began playing professional football with local side Rudar Velenje before moving to Maribor. Cvikl played for Rudar Velenje and Maribor in the Slovenian PrvaLiga. He had spell with Zeytinburnuspor in the Turkish Super Lig from 1993 to 1995. He had played in Rudar's first ever European matches in the 1995 UEFA Intertoto Cup and scored his final goal in his final career game for Maribor on 30 November 1997.

== International career ==
Cvikl made his debut for Slovenia in a June 1992 friendly match away against Estonia, coming on as a 46th-minute substitute for Zoran Ubavič, and earned a total of 6 caps, scoring no goals. His final international was a November 1995 European Championship qualification match against Croatia.

== Personal life ==
After suffering from a long illness, Cvikl died in Ljubljana in July 1999. He was survived by his wife Jasmina and son Luka.

== See also ==
- NK Maribor players
