= Štefan Škaper =

Slovenian footballer (born 1966)

Personal information
- Date of birth: 6 October 1966 (age 60)
- Place of birth: Beltinci, SFR Yugoslavia
- Position: Forward

Youth career
- Mura

Senior career*
Years	Team	Apps	(Gls)
- Olimpija Ljubljana
1990–1996	Beltinci		
1996–2000	Mura	87	(39)
2002	Križevci	11	(5)
2003–2004	Beltinci	27	(16)

International career
1994–1995	Slovenia	4	(0)

Managerial career
- 2005: Beltinci
- Bogojina
- Gančani
- 2007: Nafta Lendava (caretaker)
- 2010–2011: Odranci
- 2011: Črenšovci
- 2012: Rakičan
- 2014: Čarda
- 2014–2016: Beltinci
- 2016–2017: Grad
- 2019: Tromejnik
- 2020: Kobilje
- * Club domestic league appearances and goals

Štefan Škaper (born 6 October 1966) is a Slovenian retired footballer who played as a forward.

== Career ==
Škaper played for Beltinci between 1990 and 1996 and for Mura between 1996 and 2000. He was the Slovenian PrvaLiga top goalscorer for two consecutive seasons in 1993–94 and 1994–95, scoring 23 and 25 goals, respectively. He is also the second all-time top goalscorer in the Slovenian PrvaLiga with 130 goals, and holds the record for the most hat-tricks in Slovenian top division, with eight. In addition, he is one of two players who scored a record five goals in a single Slovenian league match.

Škaper was capped four times for the Slovenia national team between 1994 and 1995.
