= Novica Nikčević =

Serbian footballer

Personal information
- Date of birth: 7 October 1972 (age 54)
- Position: Forward

Senior career*
Years	Team	Apps	(Gls)
- Zemun
1991–1993	Izola	33	(14)
1994	Istra	13	(4)
1994	Celje	11	(4)
1995	Gorica	14	(13)
1995	Olimpija	16	(8)
1996	Korotan Prevalje	32	(9)
1997	Istra	8	(2)
1997–2000	Gorica	56	(31)
1999–2000	Lokeren	16	(4)
2000	Mura	5	(0)
2000	Koper	5	(0)
2001	Tabor Sežana	12	(1)

Managerial career
- 2012-2013: Koper (asst.)
- 2013-2014: Sturm Graz (asst.)
- 2014: Leeds United (asst.)
- 2020-2021: Slovan Bratislava (asst.)
- * Club domestic league appearances and goals

Novica Nikčević (born 7 October 1972) is a Slovenian retired footballer who played as a forward. He is currently the assistant coach of Darko Milanič at Slovan Bratislava.

== Playing career ==
Nikčević played for a number of Slovenian clubs throughout his career. He was Slovenian PrvaLiga top scorer in the 1998–99 season with 17 goals. Between 1999 and 2000, he played for the Belgian club KSC Lokeren. He also played with NK Istra in the Croatian First League.

== Coaching career ==
After retiring as a player, he became a football coach. In 2007, he was appointed the sporting director of ND Gorica where he linked up with manager Darko Milanič. He later became assistant manager at FC Koper in July 2012. He joined Milanič at SK Sturm Graz where he became his assistant manager in 2013.

On 23 September 2014, Nikčević was appointed the new assistant manager of Leeds United on a two-year deal, joining manager Darko Milanič from SK Sturm Graz. When Milanič was dismissed after six games in charge, Nikčević also left the club.
