= Dinko Vrabac =

Bosnian footballer (born 1963)

Personal information
- Full name: Dinko Vrabac
- Date of birth: January 28, 1963 (age 63)
- Place of birth: Velika Kladuša, SFR Yugoslavia
- Position: Forward

Senior career*
Years	Team	Apps	(Gls)
1981–1983	FK Sarajevo	8	(1)
1986–1987	Čelik Zenica	7	(0)
1987–1991	NK Olimpija		
1991	FK Sarajevo	15	(5)
1992–1993	NK Ljubljana	39	(9)
1994–1997	Primorje	86	(44)
- * Club domestic league appearances and goals

Dinko Vrabac (born 28 January 1963) is a former Bosnian footballer who played as a forward for several Bosnian and Slovenian clubs during the 1980s and 1990s. His brother Damir Vrabac is also a football player.
