= Marko Kmetec =

Slovenian footballer

Personal information
- Date of birth: 13 January 1976 (age 50)
- Place of birth: Ptuj, SFR Yugoslavia
- Height: 1.83 m (6 ft 0 in)
- Position: Forward

Youth career
- Drava Ptuj
- Aluminij

Senior career*
Years	Team	Apps	(Gls)
–1995	Aluminij		
1995–1997	Mura	47	(5)
1997–1999	Maribor	33	(15)
1999–2001	Olimpija	61	(21)
2001–2002	Korotan Prevalje	29	(5)
2002	Ljubljana	17	(11)
2002–2004	Olimpija	42	(27)
2004–2007	Ethnikos Achna		
2007–2008	Drava Ptuj	30	(10)
2009	Mura 05	12	(9)
2009–2012	Aluminij	86	(29)
2013	Gerečja Vas		
2013	Skorba		
- * Club domestic league appearances and goals

Marko Kmetec (born 13 January 1976) is a retired Slovenian footballer who played as a forward.

Kmetec had spells with a number of Slovenian clubs, and his only stint abroad was with the Cypriot club Ethnikos Achna, where he played between 2004 and 2007. Kmetec was also the Slovenian PrvaLiga top scorer in the 2002–03 season.
