= Ivica Vulić =

Slovenian footballer

Personal information
- Date of birth: 27 December 1973 (age 52)
- Place of birth: SFR Yugoslavia
- Height: 1.85 m (6 ft 1 in)
- Position: Forward

Senior career*
Years	Team	Apps	(Gls)
1991–1996	Gorica	124	(14)
1996–1997	Primorje	36	(17)
1997–1998	Tirol Innsbruck	12	(1)
1998–1999	Primorje	32	(10)
1999–2000	Gorica	38	(8)
2001	Brda	21	(12)
Total		263	(62)

International career
1993–1994	Slovenia U-21	9	(6)
1996	Slovenia	1	(0)
- * Club domestic league appearances and goals

Ivica Vulić (born 27 December 1973) is a Slovenian retired international footballer who played as a forward. He has 3 children.

== Career ==
Vulić was capped once by the Slovenian national team, in a 1996 loss against Bosnia and Herzegovina.
