= Skalna Klet =

Sports stadium in Slovenia

- Interactive map of Skalna Klet
- Former names: Sportplatz Felsenkeller
- Location: Celje, Slovenia
- Coordinates: 46°13′30″N 15°16′13″E
- Surface: Grass

Construction
- Opened: 1904
- Renovated: 1948, 1952, 1993, 1995, 2019
- Expanded: 1995
- Cost: €800,000 (2019 renovations)

Tenants
- Athletik SK (1906–1941); ŽŠD Celje (1951–1967); NK Celje (1983–2003)

Skalna Klet Sports Centre (Slovene: Športni center Skalna Klet) or simply Skalna Klet is a multi-purpose stadium in Celje, Slovenia. Opened in 1904, the stadium underwent several renovations, most recently in 2019. It was used for football matches and was the home ground of the Slovenian PrvaLiga team NK Celje until 2003. It is now used only as a training facility.
