= NK Celje =

Slovenian football club

Celje
- Full name: Nogometni klub Celje
- Nicknames: Grofje (The Counts); Rumeno-modri (The Yellow and Blues)
- Short name: NK Celje
- Founded: 28 December 1919; 106 years ago (as SK Celje)
- Ground: Stadion Z'dežele
- Capacity: 13,059
- President: Valeriy Kolotilo
- Manager: Zoran Zeljković
- League: Slovenian PrvaLiga
- 2025–26: Slovenian PrvaLiga, 1st of 10 (champions)
- Website: www.nk-celje.si
Home colours	Away colours

Nogometni klub Celje (English: Celje Football Club), commonly referred to as NK Celje or simply Celje ([ˈtsɛ̀ːljɛ]), is a professional football club based in Celje, Slovenia. Founded in 1919, the club competes in the Slovenian PrvaLiga, the top tier of Slovenian football. Together with Maribor, Celje are the only club to have participated in every season of the PrvaLiga since the competition was established in 1991.

Celje have won the Slovenian championship three times, in 2019–20, 2023–24 and 2025–26, and the Slovenian Football Cup twice, in 2004–05 and 2024–25. Before Slovenian independence, the club, then known as Kladivar, won the Slovenian Republic League and Slovenian Republic Cup in 1963–64 and qualified for the Yugoslav Second League.

The club's most successful European campaign came in 2024–25, when Celje became the first Slovenian club to reach the quarter-finals of a major UEFA club competition, losing 4–3 on aggregate to Fiorentina. In 2026, the club reached the Champions League play-off round for the first time and, after elimination by Slovan Bratislava, qualified for the league phase of the 2026–27 UEFA Europa League.

== History ==
=== Origins and early football in Celje (1919–1946) ===
Kladivar Celje in 1964, the year the club won the Slovenian Republic League and Republic Cup and qualified for the Yugoslav Second League.

Organised football in Celje predates the present club. A German athletic club, SK Cillier SV, was founded in the city in 1906, while the first Slovenian sports club in Celje, I. SSK Celje (I. slovenski športni klub Celje), was formally established in 1919. The new club established a ground at Glazija beside Ljubljanska cesta and played its first official match against Ilirija of Ljubljana. Other clubs active in the city between the world wars included Olimp, Svoboda and Jugoslavija Celje.

I. SSK Celje initially played friendly matches before entering regional competitions. A match against the professional side Rapid Vienna in 1920 was among the early high-profile fixtures in the city. Football in Celje was reorganised after the Second World War, during which the pre-war Slovenian clubs had been dissolved.

=== Kladivar and the Yugoslav period (1946–1991) ===
After the war, Fizkulturno društvo Celje and Športno društvo Olimp merged to form NK Kladivar. The combined team finished third in the Slovenian Republic League in its early post-war period. The club's first major sporting peak arrived in 1963–64, when Kladivar won both the Slovenian Republic League and the Republic Cup. They then defeated Karlovac in qualification to reach the Yugoslav Second League. Contemporary recollections describe the promotion as one of the major sporting events in Celje in the 1960s, with more than 7,000 spectators reported at Glazija for the decisive period of the campaign.

In 1967, Kladivar merged with Železničar Celje, a railway club founded in 1952. The combined club remained primarily in the Slovenian Republic League until relegation in 1978–79, after which it spent much of the following period in the regional competition. By 1990–91, competing under the sponsored name Ingrad-Kladivar Celje, the team had returned to the Republic League. When Slovenia became independent in 1991, Celje entered the newly established national top division and have remained there ever since.

=== Independence and the Publikum era (1991–2007) ===
The transition to independent Slovenian football brought major organisational and commercial changes. In 1992, the club adopted the name NK Publikum. Under Janez Zavrl, Celje reached the 1993 Slovenian Cup final. Although they lost to Olimpija, the run secured the club's first qualification for UEFA competition, and Celje made their European debut against Odense BK in the 1993–94 European Cup Winners' Cup. A second cup final followed in 1995, while their first European victory came against Maccabi Haifa in the 1997 UEFA Intertoto Cup.

After several quieter seasons, Celje challenged strongly on two fronts in 2002–03. They finished as PrvaLiga runners-up behind Maribor and also reached the Slovenian Cup final, where they again finished second. Their first major trophy since independence finally arrived in 2005. In the cup final at their new home ground, then called Arena Petrol, Celje defeated Gorica 1–0. They returned to the final the following year but lost to Koper on penalties. In February 2007, the club dropped the Publikum name and again became NK Celje.

=== NK Celje before the first title (2007–2019) ===
The first decade under the restored NK Celje name was characterised by regular cup runs but no league championship. Celje were cup runners-up in 2012, 2013, 2015 and 2016, adding to a long sequence of near misses in the competition. The strongest league campaign of this period came in 2014–15, when a young side finished second with 70 points and also reached the cup final.

That season also produced one of the club's longest unbeaten runs of the PrvaLiga era. In November 2014, Celje extended their unbeaten sequence to 17 league matches and 21 matches in all competitions; Benjamin Verbič scored after 11 seconds in a 3–0 win over Zavrč, which the Football Association of Slovenia described as the fastest goal in PrvaLiga history at the time. In 2019 the club marked the centenary of organised Slovenian football in Celje, still waiting for its first national league championship.

=== First championship and transition (2019–2023) ===
The long wait ended in the 2019–20 season. The championship was decided on the final day at Stadion Z'dežele, where Celje faced direct title rivals Olimpija Ljubljana. A 2–2 draw was enough for Celje to finish first and become Slovenian champions for the first time. The achievement came just after the club's centenary and changed Celje's status from a perennial Cup contender into a national champion.

The title was followed by two more difficult league seasons, including a seventh-place finish in 2020–21. Celje nevertheless reached another Slovenian Cup final in 2021. By 2022–23, the club had returned to the top end of the table, finishing second and laying the foundations for the most successful period in its history.

=== Domestic and European breakthrough (2023–present) ===
Albert Riera was appointed head coach in July 2023 and won nine of his first twelve league matches before leaving for Bordeaux in October. Damir Krznar succeeded him and maintained the title challenge. On 28 April 2024, Yegor Prutsev scored the only goal in a 1–0 home victory against Olimpija that secured Celje's second championship with three rounds remaining. The attendance of 7,242 was then a club record at Stadion Z'dežele. Krznar left in July 2024 after 20 wins in 31 matches, having become the second coach to lead Celje to a Slovenian championship.

Riera returned for a second spell in July 2024. During 2024–25 Celje reached the league phase of a UEFA competition for the first time, advanced all the way to the Conference League quarter-finals and won their second Slovenian Cup by beating Koper 4–0 in the final. The following season brought another Conference League knockout campaign and a third league title. Riera departed for Eintracht Frankfurt in February 2026 after 110 matches across his two spells; Ivan Mayewski briefly succeeded him before Vítor Campelos was appointed in March. Celje mathematically secured the 2025–26 championship on 19 April with a 2–0 away win against Mura.

== Colours, names and identity ==
Celje are traditionally associated with yellow and blue, reflected in the nickname Rumeno-modri (The Yellow and Blues). The club are also widely known as Grofje (The Counts). The city of Celje is historically associated with the Counts of Celje, and the club routinely uses Grofje in its communications and match coverage.

The name of the football organisation has changed several times. I. SSK Celje was established in 1919; after the post-war reorganisation, the club became NK Kladivar. By 1990–91 it competed as Ingrad-Kladivar Celje, and in 1992 adopted the sponsored name NK Publikum. The Publikum designation was dropped in February 2007, after which the club again competed as NK Celje.

=== Kit manufacturers ===
Period	Manufacturer
Until 2004	Uhlsport
2004–2013	Joma
2013–2019	Legea
2019–present	Nike

Source: Football Kit Archive.

== Stadium ==
Stadion Z'dežele's east grandstand entrance plaza

Celje's early home was the ground at Glazija. The club later also used Skalna Klet, which became its permanent home after the Glazija ground was demolished in the early 1980s. Skalna Klet eventually became unsuitable for UEFA competitions, leading to the construction of a new stadium in a former clay-pit area in the eastern part of the city.

Construction of the new ground began in 1999. The first completed stand, on the east side, provided approximately 3,600 seats. The first match at the new venue was played on 9 September 2003, when Slovenia's under-21 team drew 0–0 with France; the official club opening followed three days later, when Celje beat Ljubljana 3–1. Simon Sešlar scored Celje's first goal at the stadium. Further construction added the west, south and north stands, with the completed stadium reaching a capacity of 13,059 in 2008.

The ground was initially known as Arena Petrol and was renamed Stadion Z'dežele in 2017 under a sponsorship agreement. Its role in the club's recent rise has been especially visible in European competition. The 2025 Conference League quarter-final against Fiorentina drew 12,512 spectators, while 11,500 attended the 2026 Champions League play-off against Slovan Bratislava.

== Supporters and rivalries ==
=== Celjski Grofje ===
The club's organised supporters are known as Celjski Grofje 1992. The group traces its organised activity to 8 March 1992, when supporters began gathering at Skalna Klet. At Stadion Z'dežele, the group's active support is associated with the north stand.

Home support increased markedly during the club's second championship season. In 2023–24, Celje's league home matches drew 35,093 spectators in total, an average of 1,950, while the title-clinching match against Olimpija attracted 7,242 spectators and set a club attendance record at the time. The record was surpassed the following season when 12,512 attended the European quarter-final against Fiorentina.

=== Styrian derby ===
Matches between Celje and their Styrian rivals Maribor are commonly referred as the Štajerski derbi (Styrian derby). The fixture gained additional sporting significance as Celje became a regular championship contender in the 2020s.

== European football ==
Stadion Z'dežele during Celje's Champions League play-off against Slovan Bratislava in August 2026.

=== Early European campaigns ===
Celje qualified for UEFA competition for the first time through their appearance in the 1993 Slovenian Cup final. Their debut came in the qualifying round of the 1993–94 European Cup Winners' Cup, where they lost 1–0 on aggregate to Odense BK. The club later appeared in the UEFA Intertoto Cup in 1997 and 2001. Their first European victory was an away win over Maccabi Haifa in 1997, while the 2001 campaign took them to the third round before elimination by Lausanne-Sport on away goals.

Celje returned to the UEFA Cup in 2003–04 after their league runners-up finish. They defeated Belasica 12–2 on aggregate in qualifying before losing a close first-round tie against Maccabi Haifa. Sporadic Europa League appearances followed in 2005–06, 2012–13, 2013–14 and 2015–16. Their first Slovenian league title brought a Champions League qualifying place in 2020–21; Celje beat Dundalk 3–0 before losing 2–1 to Molde and later exiting the Europa League against Ararat-Armenia.

=== Return to Europe and 2024–25 breakthrough ===
Celje's modern European rise began in 2023–24. Under Albert Riera, they eliminated Vitória S.C. on penalties and then Neman Grodno to reach the play-off round of the Conference League qualifiers for the first time, where Maccabi Tel Aviv ended the run.

As Slovenian champions in 2024, Celje entered Champions League qualifying. After beating Flora 7–1 on aggregate they were eliminated by Slovan Bratislava, then lost to Shamrock Rovers in the Europa League before overcoming Pyunik in the Conference League play-off. This secured the club's first appearance in the main phase of a UEFA competition. Celje finished 21st in the 36-team league phase. The campaign included a 5–1 home victory against İstanbul Başakşehir, a 3–3 draw with Jagiellonia Białystok and a 3–2 win over The New Saints.

In the knockout phase, Celje eliminated APOEL 4–2 on aggregate before one of the most dramatic ties in the club's history against Lugano. Celje won the first leg 1–0, lost the return 5–4 after extra time and advanced 3–1 on penalties after a 5–5 aggregate draw. That made Celje the first Slovenian club to reach the quarter-finals of a major UEFA competition. Against two-time Conference League finalists Fiorentina, Celje lost the first leg 2–1 in front of 12,512 spectators but drew 2–2 in Florence after briefly leading 2–1 in the second half. Fiorentina progressed 4–3 on aggregate.

=== 2025–26 Conference League ===
The following season Celje again began in the Europa League qualifiers, overcoming Sabah before losing to AEK Larnaca. Dropping into the Conference League, they reversed a first-leg defeat against Lugano with a 5–0 away win and then beat Baník Ostrava 3–0 on aggregate to reach the league phase for a second consecutive season. Celje finished 13th in the league phase and qualified directly for the knockout phase play-offs.

Celje beat Drita 6–4 on aggregate in the knockout phase play-offs. Their second consecutive European spring ended in the round of 16 against AEK Athens: after a 4–0 home defeat, Celje won the second leg 2–0 in Athens but were eliminated 4–2 on aggregate.

=== 2026–27 Champions League and Europa League ===
As 2025–26 Slovenian champions, Celje entered the 2026–27 Champions League in the second qualifying round. They advanced past Egnatia after a penalty shoot-out and then eliminated Ararat-Armenia 3–2 on aggregate, reaching the Champions League play-off round for the first time. In the play-off they drew 1–1 away to Slovan Bratislava before losing the return 2–1 after extra time in front of 11,500 spectators at Stadion Z'dežele, falling 3–2 on aggregate.

Elimination from the Champions League sent Celje into the Europa League league phase, their first appearance in that stage of the competition. The draw paired Celje with Bayer Leverkusen, Omonia, Red Bull Salzburg, Sturm Graz, Ferencváros, Olympiacos, Ararat-Armenia, and NEC Nijmegen.

== Ownership and management ==
=== Ownership and organisation ===
The senior football operation is connected to NKCE d.o.o., a company registered in December 2019. Public business records list Sport Invest d.o.o. as holding 74% of NKCE and the NK Celje association holding 26%. The 74–26 structure was also reported by Sportklub when examining the organisation of Slovenian top flight clubs in 2021–22.

Valeriy Kolotilo was elected club president in July 2023 after previously serving as general director.

=== Club officials ===
Role	Name
President	Valeriy Kolotilo
Executive director	Pavel Shvets
Business director	Zoran Podkoritnik
Sporting director	Gennady Golubin
Technical director	Sebastjan Gobec
Development director	Elvir Jovanović
Board of directors	Valeriy Kolotilo; Bojan Šrot; Izidor Krivec; Aljoša Džumhur; Marko Cvikl; Pavel Shvets; Gennady Golubin; Bojan Cvelfar; Tit Potočnik; Rok Capl; Peter Drobež; Silvo Pečjak
Head of academy	Spasoje Bulajič

Source: NK Celje

=== First-team coaching and support staff ===
Role	Name
Head coach	Zoran Zeljković
Assistant coaches	Džengis Čavušević; Jovan Vidović
Goalkeeping coach	Benjamin Levak
Fitness coach	Hrvoje Božičković
Analysts	Anže Džumhur; Maks Gantar
Conditioning coach	Alen Janković
Head of physiotherapists	Toni Nenadić
Physiotherapists	Klemen Kozole; Marij Marinić
Kitmen	Rok Potočnik; Nataša Potočnik

Source: NK Celje

== Sponsorship ==
Cinkarna Celje is one of the club's principal long-term commercial partners. In July 2026, the company stated that its continuous principal sponsorship of NK Celje had lasted for more than 20 years, describing it as one of the longest-running partnerships in Slovenian sport. Another major partner, Austrian insurance group GRAWE, extended its agreement with the club in June 2026 through 2031.

Partner	Role / status
Cinkarna Celje	Principal sponsor; continuous partnership for more than 20 years
GRAWE	Major long-term partner; agreement extended through 2031
Nike	Kit manufacturer since 2019

== Players ==
=== Current squad ===
As of 7 September 2026

Note: Flags indicate national team as defined under FIFA eligibility rules; some limited exceptions apply. Players may hold more than one non-FIFA nationality.

No.	Pos.	Nation	Player
1	GK	SLO	Žan-Luk Leban
2	DF	LTU	Pijus Širvys
3	DF	SLO	Damjan Vuklišević
4	MF	SLO	Darko Hrka
5	DF	SLO	Gašper Vodeb
6	DF	LTU	Artemijus Tutyškinas
7	FW	SLO	Benjamin Verbič
8	MF	BIH	Mario Kvesić
9	FW	SLO	Blaž Kramer
10	MF	SLO	Svit Sešlar
11	MF	KOS	Milot Avdyli
12	GK	SLO	Luka Kolar
13	MF	NGR	Papa Daniel
14	MF	SLO	Luka Vešner Tičić

No.	Pos.	Nation	Player
15	DF	SLO	Žan Žužek
17	MF	SLO	Andrej Kotnik
19	MF	SLO	Mark Zabukovnik (captain)
20	DF	SEN	Alpha Diounkou
23	GK	SLO	Žiga Frelih
25	FW	KOS	Veton Tusha
27	MF	CRO	Ivan Ćalušić
33	DF	GRE	Leonardo Koutris
44	DF	POL	Łukasz Bejger
47	FW	LTU	Armandas Kučys
77	DF	SLO	Matic Ivanšek
91	FW	AUS	Yaya Dukuly
94	FW	SLO	Rudi Požeg Vancaš

=== Out on loan ===
Note: Flags indicate national team as defined under FIFA eligibility rules; some limited exceptions apply. Players may hold more than one non-FIFA nationality.

No.	Pos.	Nation	Player
—	DF	SLO	Matija Kavčič (at Brinje Grosuplje until June 2027)
—	DF	FRO	Hanus Sørensen (at Aluminij until June 2027)
—	MF	SLO	Florjan Jevšenak (at Mura until June 2027)

No.	Pos.	Nation	Player
—	MF	CRO	Jakov Pranjić (at Gorica until June 2027)
—	MF	CRO	Ivica Vidović (at Zrinjski Mostar until June 2027)

== Managers ==
- (Socialist Federal Republic of Yugoslavia) Bojan Prašnikar (1989–1991)
- (Slovenia) Stanko Božičevič (1992)
- (Slovenia) Janko Benčina (1992)
- (Slovenia) Janez Zavrl (1993–1994)
- (Croatia) Ivan Marković (1994)
- (Slovenia) Filip Mendaš (1994)
- (Slovenia) Borut Jarc (1994–1996)
- (Slovenia) Milovan Tarbuk (1996–1997)
- (Croatia) Stanko Poklepović (1997–1998)
- (Slovenia) Edin Osmanović (1998–1999)
- (North Macedonia) Nikola Ilievski (1999–2000)
- (Slovenia) Marijan Pušnik (2000–2004)
- (Croatia) Ivica Matković (2004–2005)
- (Slovenia) Marko Pocrnjič (2005)
- (North Macedonia) Nikola Ilievski (2005–2006)
- (Slovenia) Janez Žilnik (2006)
- (Slovenia) Pavel Pinni (2007–2008)
- (Slovenia) Slaviša Stojanović (2008–2009)
- (Croatia) Milan Đuričić (2009–2010)
- (Slovenia) Damijan Romih (2010)
- (Slovenia) Stane Bevc (2010–2011)
- (Slovenia) Damijan Romih (2011–2012)
- (Slovenia) Marijan Pušnik (2012)
- (Slovenia) Miloš Rus (2013–2014)
- (Slovenia) Simon Rožman (2014–2015)
- (Slovenia) Iztok Kapušin (2015–2016)
- (Slovenia) Robert Pevnik (2016)
- (Croatia) Igor Jovićević (2016–2017)
- (Slovenia) Tomaž Petrovič (2017)
- (Slovenia) Dušan Kosič (2017–2020)
- (Czech Republic) Jiří Jarošík (2020–2021)
- (Slovenia) Agron Šalja (2021)
- (Slovenia) Simon Sešlar (2021)
- (Slovenia) Simon Rožman (2022)
- (Ukraine) Roman Pylypchuk (2022–2023)
- (Spain) Albert Riera (2023)
- (Croatia) Damir Krznar (2023–2024)
- (Spain) Albert Riera (2024–2026)
- (Belarus) Ivan Mayewski (2026)
- (Portugal) Vítor Campelos (2026)
- (Slovenia) Zoran Zeljković (2026–present)

== Honours ==
League

- Slovenian First League (since 1991)
  - Winners (3): 2019–20, 2023–24, 2025–26
  - Runners-up (3): 2002–03, 2014–15, 2022–23
- Slovenian Republic League (prior 1991)
  - Winners (1): 1963–64
  - Runners-up (6): 1936–37, 1950, 1959–60, 1960–61, 1970–71, 1973–74

Cup

- Slovenian Cup (since 1991)
  - Winners (2): 2004–05, 2024–25
  - Runners-up (9): 1992–93, 1994–95, 2002–03, 2005–06, 2011–12, 2012–13, 2014–15, 2015–16, 2020–21
- Slovenian Republic Cup (prior 1991)
  - Winners (1): 1964
- MNZ Celje Cup
  - Runners-up: 1991–92

== Records and statistics ==
=== Club records ===
The following records cover Celje players in the Slovenian PrvaLiga since 1991. Sebastjan Gobec holds both the club record and the all-time PrvaLiga appearance record with 488 league appearances.

==== Most league appearances ====
Rank	Player	Appearances
1	(Slovenia) Sebastjan Gobec	488
2	(Slovenia) Simon Sešlar	332
3	(Bosnia and Herzegovina) Amel Mujčinović	305
4	(Slovenia) Marko Križnik	266

==== Top league goalscorers ====
Rank	Player	Goals
1	(Slovenia) Andrej Goršek	67
2	(Bosnia and Herzegovina) Faik Kamberović	62
3	(Slovenia) Dominik Beršnjak	53
4	(Slovenia) Aljoša Matko	39

Source: Football Association of Slovenia.

=== Domestic league and cup record ===
Season	League	Position	Pts	P	W	D	L	GF	GA	Cup
1991–92	1. SNL	9	41	40	14	13	13	43	51	Round of 16
1992–93	1. SNL	10	32	34	12	8	14	37	47	Runners-up
1993–94	1. SNL	4	38	30	14	10	6	50	34	Round of 16
1994–95	1. SNL	6	38	30	16	6	8	50	27	Runners-up
1995–96	1. SNL	5	51	36	13	12	11	62	47	Semi-finals
1996–97	1. SNL	4	47	36	12	11	13	55	61	Quarter-finals
1997–98	1. SNL	6	49	36	14	7	15	57	57	Quarter-finals
1998–99	1. SNL	7	42	33	10	12	11	30	35	Round of 16
1999–00	1. SNL	6	47	33	11	14	8	53	45	Quarter-finals
2000–01	1. SNL	5	50	33	15	5	13	59	52	First round
2001–02	1. SNL	6	48	33	14	6	13	50	39	Round of 16
2002–03	1. SNL	2	55	31	15	10	6	57	38	Runners-up
2003–04	1. SNL	10	39	32	11	6	15	61	52	Quarter-finals
2004–05	1. SNL	3	52	32	16	4	12	47	28	Winners
2005–06	1. SNL	6	49	36	15	4	17	48	59	Runners-up
2006–07	1. SNL	7	45	36	11	12	13	54	51	Semi-finals
2007–08	1. SNL	8	45	36	13	6	17	42	51	Quarter-finals
2008–09	1. SNL	4	53	36	15	8	13	48	39	Round of 16
2009–10	1. SNL	5	51	36	14	9	13	53	56	Semi-finals
2010–11	1. SNL	8	37	36	9	10	17	41	55	Round of 16
2011–12	1. SNL	8	37	36	9	10	17	44	56	Runners-up
2012–13	1. SNL	5	49	36	12	13	11	39	39	Runners-up
2013–14	1. SNL	8	37	36	10	7	19	30	58	Quarter-finals
2014–15	1. SNL	2	70	36	20	10	6	58	31	Runners-up
2015–16	1. SNL	5	45	36	11	12	13	32	46	Runners-up
2016–17	1. SNL	5	55	36	15	10	11	48	39	Round of 16
2017–18	1. SNL	5	50	36	14	8	14	56	51	Semi-finals
2018–19	1. SNL	5	49	36	12	13	11	45	51	Round of 16
2019–20	1. SNL	1	69	36	19	12	5	74	36	Quarter-finals
2020–21	1. SNL	7	43	36	12	7	17	36	41	Runners-up
2021–22	1. SNL	8	42	36	12	6	18	46	50	Semi-finals
2022–23	1. SNL	2	67	36	19	10	7	53	34	Quarter-finals
2023–24	1. SNL	1	79	36	24	7	5	75	34	Round of 32
2024–25	1. SNL	4	61	36	17	10	9	76	51	Winners
2025–26	1. SNL	1	74	34	23	5	6	85	32	Round of 16

Key

- P – Matches played
- W – Matches won
- D – Matches drawn
- L – Matches lost
- GF – Goals for
- GA – Goals against
- Pts – Points

=== European record ===
All results (home and away) list Celje's goal tally first.

Season	Competition	Round	Opposition	Home	Away	Aggregate
1993–94	European Cup Winners' Cup	Qualifying round	(Denmark) Odense BK	0–1	0–0	0–1
1997	UEFA Intertoto Cup	Group stage	(Turkey) Antalyaspor	1–1	—	2nd
1997	UEFA Intertoto Cup	Group stage	(Israel) Maccabi Haifa	—	1–0	2nd
1997	UEFA Intertoto Cup	Group stage	(Russia) Lokomotiv Nizhny Novgorod	1–2	—	2nd
1997	UEFA Intertoto Cup	Group stage	(Federal Republic of Yugoslavia) Proleter Zrenjanin	—	0–0	2nd
2001	UEFA Intertoto Cup	First round	(Denmark) Aarhus	7–1	0–1	7–2
2001	UEFA Intertoto Cup	Second round	(Slovakia) Petržalka	5–0	1–1	6–1
2001	UEFA Intertoto Cup	Third round	(Switzerland) Lausanne-Sport	1–1	0–0	1–1 (a)
2003–04	UEFA Cup	Qualifying round	(North Macedonia) Belasica	7–2	5–0	12–2
2003–04	UEFA Cup	First round	(Israel) Maccabi Haifa	2–2	1–2	3–4
2004	UEFA Intertoto Cup	First round	(Bosnia and Herzegovina) Sloboda Tuzla	2–1	0–1	2–2 (a)
2005–06	UEFA Cup	Second qualifying round	(Bulgaria) Levski Sofia	1–0	0–3	1–3
2012–13	UEFA Europa League	First qualifying round	(Moldova) Dacia Chișinău	0–1	0–1	0–2
2013–14	UEFA Europa League	First qualifying round	(Norway) Tromsø	0–2	2–1	2–3
2015–16	UEFA Europa League	First qualifying round	(Poland) Śląsk Wrocław	0–1	1–3	1–4
2020–21 (Note: Only one match per qualifying round was played due to the COVID-19 pandemic.)	UEFA Champions League	First qualifying round	(Republic of Ireland) Dundalk	3–0 (Note: Celje played their home match at Szusza Ferenc Stadion in Budapest (Hungary) due to travel restrictions related to the COVID-19 pandemic.)	—	
2020–21	UEFA Champions League	Second qualifying round	(Norway) Molde	1–2	—	
2020–21	UEFA Europa League	Third qualifying round	Ararat-Armenia	—	0–1 (Note: After extra time.)	—
2023–24	UEFA Europa Conference League	Second qualifying round	(Portugal) Vitória de Guimarães	3–4	1–0	4–4 (4–2 p)
2023–24	UEFA Europa Conference League	Third qualifying round	(Belarus) Neman Grodno	1–0	4–1	5–1
2023–24	UEFA Europa Conference League	Play-off round	(Israel) Maccabi Tel Aviv	1–1	1–4	2–5
2024–25	UEFA Champions League	First qualifying round	(Estonia) Flora	2–1	5–0	7–1
2024–25	UEFA Champions League	Second qualifying round	(Slovakia) Slovan Bratislava	1–1	0–5	1–6
2024–25	UEFA Europa League	Third qualifying round	(Republic of Ireland) Shamrock Rovers	1–0	1–3	2–3
2024–25	UEFA Conference League	Play-off round	(Armenia) Pyunik	4–1	0–1	4–2
2024–25	UEFA Conference League	League phase	(Portugal) Vitória de Guimarães	—N/a	1–3	21st out of 36
2024–25	UEFA Conference League	League phase	(Turkey) İstanbul Başakşehir	5–1	—N/a	21st out of 36
2024–25	UEFA Conference League	League phase	(Spain) Real Betis	—N/a	1–2	21st out of 36
2024–25	UEFA Conference League	League phase	(Poland) Jagiellonia Białystok	3–3	—N/a	21st out of 36
2024–25	UEFA Conference League	League phase	(Cyprus) Pafos	—N/a	0–2	21st out of 36
2024–25	UEFA Conference League	League phase	(Wales) The New Saints	3–2	—N/a	21st out of 36
2024–25	UEFA Conference League	Knockout phase play-offs	(Cyprus) APOEL	2–2	2–0	4–2
2024–25	UEFA Conference League	Round of 16	(Switzerland) Lugano	1–0	4–5	5–5 (3–1 p)
2024–25	UEFA Conference League	Quarter-finals	(Italy) Fiorentina	1–2	2–2	3–4
2025–26	UEFA Europa League	First qualifying round	(Azerbaijan) Sabah	3–3	3–2	6–5
2025–26	UEFA Europa League	Second qualifying round	(Cyprus) AEK Larnaca	1–1	1–2	2–3
2025–26	UEFA Conference League	Third qualifying round	(Switzerland) Lugano	2–4	5–0	7–4
2025–26	UEFA Conference League	Play-off round	(Czech Republic) Baník Ostrava	1–0	2–0	3–0
2025–26	UEFA Conference League	League phase	(Greece) AEK Athens	3–1	—N/a	13th out of 36
2025–26	UEFA Conference League	League phase	(Republic of Ireland) Shamrock Rovers	—N/a	2–0	13th out of 36
2025–26	UEFA Conference League	League phase	(Poland) Legia Warsaw	2–1	—N/a	13th out of 36
2025–26	UEFA Conference League	League phase	(Czech Republic) Sigma Olomouc	—N/a	1–2	13th out of 36
2025–26	UEFA Conference League	League phase	(Croatia) Rijeka	—N/a	0–3	13th out of 36
2025–26	UEFA Conference League	League phase	(Republic of Ireland) Shelbourne	0–0	—N/a	13th out of 36
2025–26	UEFA Conference League	Knockout phase play-offs	(Kosovo) Drita	3–2	3–2	6–4
2025–26	UEFA Conference League	Round of 16	(Greece) AEK Athens	0–4	2–0	2–4
2026–27	UEFA Champions League	Second qualifying round	(Albania) Egnatia	2–2	3–3	5–5 (4–1 p)
2026–27	UEFA Champions League	Third qualifying round	Ararat-Armenia	2–0	1–2	3–2
2026–27	UEFA Champions League	Play-off round	(Slovakia) Slovan Bratislava	1–2	1–1	2–3
2026–27	UEFA Europa League	League phase	(Germany) Bayer Leverkusen	—N/a	0–2	
2026–27	UEFA Europa League	League phase	(Cyprus) Omonia	0–3	—N/a	
2026–27	UEFA Europa League	League phase	(Austria) Red Bull Salzburg	2–2	—N/a	
2026–27	UEFA Europa League	League phase	(Austria) Sturm Graz	—N/a	3–2	
2026–27	UEFA Europa League	League phase	(Hungary) Ferencváros	—N/a		
2026–27	UEFA Europa League	League phase	(Greece) Olympiacos		—N/a	
2026–27	UEFA Europa League	League phase	Ararat-Armenia	—N/a		
2026–27	UEFA Europa League	League phase	(Netherlands) NEC		—N/a	
