= 2008–09 Slovenian Football Cup =

Tournament details
- Country: Slovenia
- Teams: 31

Final positions
- Champions: Interblock (2nd title)
- Runners-up: Koper

Tournament statistics
- Matches played: 31
- Goals scored: 137 (4.42 per match)
- Top goal scorer(s): Sebastjan Cimirotič; Marcos Tavares (both 4 goals)

The 2008–09 Slovenian Football Cup was the 18th season of the Slovenian Football Cup, Slovenia's football knockout competition. It started on 2 August 2008 and ended on 30 May 2009 with the final. The defending champions were Interblock, who successfully defended the title by defeating Koper 2–1 in the final.

== Qualified clubs ==
=== 2008–09 Slovenian PrvaLiga members ===
- Celje
- Domžale
- Drava Ptuj
- Gorica
- Interblock
- Koper
- Maribor
- Nafta Lendava
- Primorje
- Rudar Velenje

Additional place: Livar

=== Qualified through MNZ Regional Cups ===
- MNZ Ljubljana: Olimpija Ljubljana, Bela Krajina, Krka
- MNZ Maribor: Slovenj Gradec, Dravograd, Korotan Prevalje
- MNZ Celje: MU Šentjur, Krško
- MNZ Koper: Izola, Bonifika
- MNZ Nova Gorica: Adria, Idrija
- MNZ Murska Sobota: Mura 05, Roma
- MNZ Lendava: Črenšovci, Polana
- MNZG-Kranj: Šenčur, Velesovo
- MNZ Ptuj: Aluminij, Zavrč

== First round ==
Since Izola withdrew from the competition before the beginning, Adria received a bye to the second round. The matches were played on 2 and 19 August 2008.

2 August 2008	Koroška Dravograd	9–1	Roma	Dravograd
17:00 CEST	Kiselak 4'; Zamernik 21'; Kardoš 23', 45'; Ovčar 50' (pen.), 63', 69'; Kašnik 75'; Dražnik 86'	Report	Cener 19' (pen.)	Stadium: Dravograd Sports Centre; Attendance: 80; Referee: Janez Babnik

19 August 2008	Bela Krajina	1–2	Bonifika	Črnomelj
17:00 CEST	Dežmar 67'	Report	Lečić 45'; Škrbina 86'	Stadium: Loka Stadium; Attendance: 200; Referee: Dejan Balažič

19 August 2008	Olimpija Ljubljana	8–0	Velesovo	Ljubljana
17:00 CEST	Cimirotič 2', 50', 67', 89' (pen.); Pavlin 23', 41'; Alagić 66'; Mitraković 72'	Report		Stadium: ŽŠD Ljubljana; Attendance: 200; Referee: Vojko Goričan

19 August 2008	Idrija	1–2	Krka	Idrija
16:00 CEST	Begič 31'	Report	Blaško 75'; Fabjan 90+2' (pen.)	Stadium: Idrija City Stadium; Attendance: 150; Referee: Bojan Mertik

19 August 2008	Zavrč	(w/o)^{1}	Korotan Prevalje	Zavrč
17:00 CEST		Report		Stadium: Sports Park; Referee: Želimirko Pavlović

19 August 2008	Črenšovci	2–5	Aluminij	Črenšovci
17:00 CEST	Ivanič 22'; Zver 61'	Report	Letonja 9', 32'; Šimenko 43'; Gašparič 68'; Medved 89'	Stadium: Črenšovci Sports Park; Attendance: 100; Referee: Andrej Tratnjek

19 August 2008	MU Šentjur	8–1	Polana	Šentjur
17:00 CEST	Popović 21'; Plošnik 31', 45'; Slomšek 49', 72', 74'; Drobne 83', 87'	Report	Kocet 58' (pen.)	Stadium: Šentjur Sport Park; Attendance: 150; Referee: Aleksander Likič

19 August 2008	Mura 05	11–0	Slovenj Gradec	Murska Sobota
17:00 CEST	Flisar 7', 24', 60'; Bedo 15'; Kovač 29', 41', 65'; Šnajder 35'; Ristić 62'; Bencik 83', 87'	Report		Stadium: Fazanerija; Attendance: 100; Referee: Boris Jeneš

19 August 2008	Šenčur	3–2	Krško	Šenčur
19:00 CEST	Jahić 24' (o.g.); Ovčina 79'; Stanko 86'	Report	Šekoranja 3'; Berić 45'	Stadium: Sports Park; Attendance: 100; Referee: Slavko Vinčić

Notes

- Note 1: Zavrč qualified to the next round automatically, after Korotan Prevalje withdrew from the 2008–09 Cup edition.

== Second round ==
The matches were played on 3 September 2008.

3 September 2008	Krka	3–0	Aluminij	Novo Mesto
16:00 CEST	Juršič 29'; Mojstrovič 42'; Bratić 71'	Report		Stadium: Portoval; Attendance: 50; Referee: Andrej Tratnjek

3 September 2008	Mura 05	3–1	MU Šentjur	Murska Sobota
16:00 CEST	Gobec 47'; Fajfar 68', 81'	Report	Centrih 82'	Stadium: Fazanerija; Attendance: 400; Referee: Tomislav Horvat

3 September 2008	Zavrč	1–0	Koroška Dravograd	Zavrč
16:00 CEST	Kuserbanj 14' (pen.)	Report		Stadium: Sports Park; Attendance: 50; Referee: Bojan Mertik

3 September 2008	Adria	1–5	Bonifika	Miren
16:00 CEST	Černe 42'	Report	Jakomin 3'; Lečić 19'; Bogatinov 33'; Škrbina 69'; Ostojič 86'	Stadium: Pri Štantu Stadium; Attendance: 240; Referee: Janez Babnik

3 September 2008	Šenčur	0–1	Olimpija Ljubljana	Šenčur
17:30 CEST		Report	Ibraimi 55'	Stadium: Sports Park; Attendance: 450; Referee: Emir Huselja

== Round of 16 ==
Teams from the 2008–09 Slovenian PrvaLiga entered in this round. The matches were played on 16 and 17 September 2008.

16 September 2008	Bonifika	1–2	Interblock	Izola
16:00 CEST	Božič 90+4'	Report	Zeljković 60'; Rodić 79'	Stadium: Izola City Stadium; Attendance: 300; Referee: Matjaž Bohinc

17 September 2008	Primorje	5–0	Zavrč	Ajdovščina
16:00 CEST	Selimi 39', 83'; Šaranović 43'; Džuzdanović 81'; Mlakar 90'	Report		Stadium: Ajdovščina City Stadium; Attendance: 200; Referee: Boris Jeneš

17 September 2008	Mura 05	1–3	Maribor	Murska Sobota
16:00 CEST	Fajfar 35'	Report	Tavares 25', 67'; Jelić 88'	Stadium: Fazanerija; Attendance: 2,700; Referee: Boris Tošeski

17 September 2008	Krka	1–3	Nafta	Novo Mesto
16:00 CEST	Fabjan 52'	Report	Adilović 4', 29'; Gerenčer 90+3'	Stadium: Portoval; Attendance: 200; Referee: Emir Huselja

17 September 2008	Koper	1–1 (a.e.t.) (3–1 p)	Olimpija Ljubljana	Koper
16:00 CEST	Božičič 61'	Report	Cimirotič 16'	Stadium: Bonifika Stadium; Attendance: 800; Referee: Slavko Vinčić
	Penalties
	Božičič (penalty scored); Šahinović (penalty scored); Handanagić (penalty scored)		(penalty scored) Bubanja

17 September 2008	Rudar Velenje	2–1	Celje	Velenje
18:00 CEST	Mujaković 38'; Grbić 56'	Report	Štraus 90+3'	Stadium: Ob Jezeru; Attendance: 1,700; Referee: Matej Jug

17 September 2008	Domžale	1–4	Livar	Domžale
18:00 CEST	Krcić 49'	Report	Lulić 6'; Penica 34'; Perme 58' (pen.); Kastelic 65'	Stadium: Sports Park; Attendance: 100; Referee: Andrej Tratnjek

17 September 2008	Gorica	2–1	Drava Ptuj	Nova Gorica
19:00 CEST	Đukić 7'; Osterc 33'	Report	Drevenšek 32'	Stadium: Sports Park; Attendance: 350; Referee: Aleksander Likič

== Quarter-finals ==
The matches were played on 22 October 2008.

22 October 2008	Koper	1–1 (a.e.t.) (3–2 p)	Nafta	Koper
14:00 CEST	Brulc 61'	Report	Lo Duca 51'	Stadium: Bonifika Stadium; Attendance: 200; Referee: Aleksander Likič
	Penalties
	Handanagić (penalty scored); Mertelj (penalty scored); Hasić (penalty scored)		(penalty scored) Čeh; (penalty scored) Vassiljev

22 October 2008	Primorje	2–3	Interblock	Ajdovščina
14:00 CEST	Šaranović 2' (pen.); Gabriel 32'	Report	Zahora 12', 67', 83'	Stadium: Ajdovščina City Stadium; Attendance: 250; Referee: Vojko Goričan

22 October 2008	Maribor	2–0	Rudar Velenje	Maribor
18:00 CEST	Mezga 51'; Tavares 60'	Report		Stadium: Ljudski vrt Attendance: 2,500; Referee: Dragoslav Perič

22 October 2008	Gorica	6–0	Livar	Nova Gorica
18:00 CEST	Velikonja 38', 44', 68'; Kršić 52'; Osterc 84', 85'	Report		Stadium: Sports Park; Attendance: 492; Referee: Sašo Habjanič

== Semi-finals ==
The first legs were played on 15 April, and the second legs were played on 29 April 2009.

=== First legs ===
15 April 2009	Interblock	2–2	Maribor	Ljubljana
17:00 CEST	Rakovič 66', 76' (pen.)	Report	Tavares 15'; Pavlović 71'	Stadium: ŽŠD Ljubljana; Attendance: 1,800; Referee: Damir Skomina

15 April 2009	Gorica	2–4	Koper	Nova Gorica
20:00 CEST	Kršić 14'; Velikonja 55'	Report	Handanagić 2'; Viler 21'; Brulc 43'; Božičič 62'	Stadium: Sports Park; Attendance: 550; Referee: Dragoslav Perić

=== Second legs ===
29 April 2009	Koper	0–1 (4–3 agg.)	Gorica	Koper
16:30 CEST		Report	Kovačević 70'	Stadium: Bonifika Stadium; Attendance: 200; Referee: Gregor Gostenčnik

29 April 2009	Maribor	2–3 (4–5 agg.)	Interblock	Maribor
20:00 CEST	Mezga 45'; Tavares 52'	Report	Čović 32'; Berić 71'; Iličić 86'	Stadium: Ljudski vrt Attendance: 7,000; Referee: Miran Bukovec

== Final ==
30 May 2009
20:00 CEST

Interblock	2–1	Koper
Berić 40'; Rakovič 53'	Report	Viler 76'

Ljudski vrt, Maribor
Attendance: 2,500
Referee: Darko Čeferin
