= 2007–08 Slovenian Third League =

Slovenian Third League
- Season: 2007–08
- Champions: MU Šentjur (East); Olimpija (West)
- Promoted: MU Šentjur; Olimpija
- Relegated: Pohorje; Roma; Izola; Jesenice; Portorož Piran
- Goals: 1,109
- Top goalscorer: Peter Gerenčer; Aleš Poplatnik; (both 23 goals)

The 2007–08 Slovenian Third League was the 16th season of the Slovenian Third League, the third highest level in the Slovenian football system.

== Clubs East ==
| Club | Location | Stadium | 2006–07 position |
|---|---|---|---|
| Črenšovci | Črenšovci | Črenšovci Sports Park | 10th |
| Dravinja | Slovenske Konjice | Dobrava Stadium | 10th, 2.SNL |
| Dravograd | Dravograd | Dravograd Sports Centre | 13th |
| Kovinar Štore | Štore | Na Lipi Stadium | 6th |
| Malečnik | Malečnik | Berl Sports Centre | 4th |
| Odranci | Odranci | ŠRC Odranci | 8th |
| Paloma | Sladki Vrh | Sladki Vrh Sports Park | 5th |
| Pohorje | Ruše | Ruše City Stadium | 11th |
| Roma | Vanča Vas | | 1st, Pomurska |
| MU Šentjur | Šentjur | Šentjur Sports Park | 9th |
| Šmarje pri Jelšah | Šmarje pri Jelšah | Sports Park | 3rd |
| Šmartno 1928 | Šmartno ob Paki | Šmartno Stadium | 1st, Styrian |
| Stojnci | Stojnci | Stojnci Sports Park | 7th |
| Veržej | Veržej | Čistina Stadium | 2nd |

=== League standing ===
| Pos | Team | Pld | W | D | L | GF | GA | GD | Pts | Promotion or relegation |
|---|---|---|---|---|---|---|---|---|---|---|
| 1 | MU Šentjur (C, P) | 26 | 18 | 3 | 5 | 60 | 25 | +35 | 57 | Promotion to Slovenian Second League |
| 2 | Šmartno 1928 | 26 | 14 | 5 | 7 | 51 | 47 | +4 | 47 | |
| 3 | Dravograd | 26 | 13 | 6 | 7 | 60 | 29 | +31 | 45 | |
| 4 | Veržej | 26 | 11 | 9 | 6 | 58 | 34 | +24 | 42 | |
| 5 | Malečnik | 26 | 12 | 5 | 9 | 42 | 38 | +4 | 41 | |
| 6 | Dravinja | 26 | 10 | 10 | 6 | 45 | 35 | +10 | 40 | |
| 7 | Črenšovci | 26 | 11 | 5 | 10 | 47 | 42 | +5 | 38 | |
| 8 | Odranci | 26 | 10 | 7 | 9 | 37 | 38 | −1 | 37 | |
| 9 | Šmarje pri Jelšah | 26 | 10 | 5 | 11 | 43 | 51 | −8 | 35 | |
| 10 | Stojnci | 26 | 8 | 9 | 9 | 42 | 39 | +3 | 33 | |
| 11 | Paloma | 26 | 9 | 5 | 12 | 33 | 45 | −12 | 32 | |
| 12 | Kovinar Štore | 26 | 7 | 9 | 10 | 47 | 46 | +1 | 30 | |
| 13 | Pohorje (R) | 26 | 4 | 2 | 20 | 25 | 71 | −46 | 14 | Relegation to Slovenian Regional Leagues |
| 14 | Roma (R) | 26 | 3 | 4 | 19 | 29 | 79 | −50 | 13 | Relegation to Slovenian Regional Leagues |

Source: MNZ Murska sobota
(C) Champions; (P) Promoted; (R) Relegated

== Clubs West ==
| Club | Location | Stadium | 2006–07 position |
|---|---|---|---|
| Adria | Miren | Igrišče Pri Štantu | 12th |
| Brda | Dobrovo | Vipolže Stadium | 7th |
| Dob | Dob | Dob Sports Park | 5th |
| Izola | Izola | Izola City Stadium | 10th |
| Jadran | Dekani | Dekani Sports Park | 6th |
| Jesenice | Jesenice | Podmežakla Stadium | 9th |
| Korte | Korte | Malija Stadium | 13th |
| Kranj | Kranj | Zarica Sports Park | 1st, Carniolan |
| Olimpija | Ljubljana | Bežigrad Stadium | 1st, Ljubljana |
| Portorož Piran | Piran | Pod Obzidjem Stadium | 8th |
| Radomlje | Radomlje | Radomlje Sports Park | 2nd |
| Slovan | Ljubljana | Kodeljevo Sports Park | 4th |
| Šenčur | Šenčur | Šenčur Sports Park | 9th, 2.SNL |
| Tolmin | Tolmin | Brajda Sports Park | 1st, Littoral |

=== League standing ===
| Pos | Team | Pld | W | D | L | GF | GA | GD | Pts | Promotion or relegation |
|---|---|---|---|---|---|---|---|---|---|---|
| 1 | Olimpija (C, P) | 24 | 20 | 3 | 1 | 79 | 13 | +66 | 63 | Promotion to Slovenian Second League |
| 2 | Šenčur | 24 | 16 | 4 | 4 | 50 | 25 | +25 | 52 | |
| 3 | Kranj | 24 | 13 | 5 | 6 | 45 | 30 | +15 | 44 | |
| 4 | Tolmin | 24 | 12 | 6 | 6 | 35 | 18 | +17 | 42 | |
| 5 | Izola (R) | 24 | 8 | 9 | 7 | 30 | 23 | +7 | 33 | Withdrew from the competition |
| 6 | Jadran Dekani | 24 | 8 | 5 | 11 | 28 | 38 | −10 | 29 | |
| 7 | Brda | 24 | 7 | 7 | 10 | 37 | 42 | −5 | 28 | |
| 8 | Radomlje | 24 | 8 | 4 | 12 | 35 | 47 | −12 | 28 | |
| 9 | Slovan | 24 | 8 | 3 | 13 | 35 | 51 | −16 | 27 | |
| 10 | Korte | 24 | 6 | 8 | 10 | 29 | 42 | −13 | 26 | |
| 11 | Adria | 24 | 7 | 4 | 13 | 29 | 52 | −23 | 25 | |
| 12 | Dob | 24 | 6 | 5 | 13 | 31 | 41 | −10 | 23 | |
| 13 | Jesenice (R) | 13 | 2 | 3 | 8 | 17 | 31 | −14 | 9 | Relegation to Slovenian Regional Leagues |
| 14 | Portorož Piran (R) | 13 | 0 | 6 | 7 | 10 | 37 | −27 | 6 | Relegation to Slovenian Regional Leagues |

(C) Champions; (P) Promoted; (R) Relegated

== See also ==
- 2007–08 Slovenian Second League
