= 2014–15 Slovenian Third League =

Slovenian Third League
- Season: 2014–15
- Champions: Zarica (Centre); Odranci (East); Maribor B (North); Ajdovščina (West)
- Promoted: Zarica; Drava
- Relegated: Radomlje B; Britof; Bistrica (Srednja); Serdica; Šentjur; Korotan; Bistrica (Slovenska); Malečnik; Portorož Piran
- Matches: 669
- Goals: 2,273 (3.4 per match)
- Biggest home win: Zagorje 9–0 Kočevje
- Biggest away win: Britof 0–9 Zagorje
- Highest scoring: Mons Claudius 1–9 Maribor B

The 2014–15 Slovenian Third League season began on 23 August 2014 and ended on 7 June 2015.

== Format and rules ==
For the 2014–15, the Slovenian Third League, 3. SNL, was divided into four regional groups with a total of 52 participating clubs. Three groups (i.e. North, Center, East) were composed of 14 clubs, while the West group only had 10 clubs that participated in the competition. The winners of the regular season in each group played a promotional two-legged play-offs to decide which two teams would be promoted to the Slovenian Second League. Reserve teams of the top division sides were ineligible to promote to the second division, due to the rules of the Football Association of Slovenia, which stipulate that one club's main squad and their reserve team must be at least two leagues apart in the country's football pyramid.

The number of relegated teams from each group was determined by the number of regional MNZ's from which the clubs in all four groups are a part of.

- MNZ Celje (North)
- MNZ Maribor (North)
- MNZ Ptuj (North)
- MNZG-Kranj (Centre)
- MNZ Ljubljana (Centre)
- MNZ Lendava (East)
- MNZ Murska Sobota (East)
- MNZ Koper (West)
- MNZ Nova Gorica (West)

This meant that three teams from 3. SNL North were relegated at the end of the season and replaced by the winners of the fourth tier competitions held separately in MNZ Celje, MNZ Maribor and MNZ Ptuj. The number of relegated teams from 3. SNL Centre and 3. SNL East was two, while only the bottom team was relegated from the 3. SNL West as MNZ Koper and MNZ Nova Gorica managed a combined fourth tier competition.

== 3. SNL Centre ==
=== Clubs ===
Club	Location	Stadium	2013–14 position
Bled	Bled	Bled Sports Centre	3rd, Carniolan
Britof	Britof	NK Britof Stadium	2nd, Carniolan
Ilirija	Ljubljana	Ilirija Sports Park	2nd, Ljubljana
Ivančna Gorica	Ivančna Gorica	Ivančna Gorica Stadium	4th
Jezero	Medvode	Ob Sori Stadium	12th
Kolpa	Podzemelj	Podzemelj Sports Park	3rd, Ljubljana
Kočevje	Kočevje	Gaj Stadium	5th, Ljubljana
Komenda	Komenda	Komenda Hipodrom	1st, Ljubljana
Lesce	Lesce	Na Žagi Stadium	1st, Carniolan
Radomlje B	Radomlje	Radomlje Sports Park	4th, Ljubljana
Rudar	Trbovlje	Rudar Stadium	6th
Sava	Kranj	Stražišče Sports Park	13th
Zagorje	Zagorje ob Savi	Zagorje City Stadium	3rd
Zarica	Kranj	Zarica Sports Park	2nd

=== League table ===
Pos	Team	Pld	W	D	L	GF	GA	GD	Pts	Qualification or relegation
1	Zarica Kranj (Q, P)	26	19	6	1	67	14	+53	63	Qualification to Play-offs
2	Ilirija	26	17	5	4	60	21	+39	56	
3	Ivančna Gorica	26	15	8	3	48	16	+32	53	
4	Zagorje	26	15	6	5	77	28	+49	51	
5	Radomlje B (R)	26	10	7	9	42	29	+13	37	Relegation to MNZ Ljubljana (Note: Radomlje B were relegated because their main squad, Radomlje, were relegated from the top division to the second division.)
6	Sava Kranj	26	10	6	10	36	36	0	36	
7	Rudar Trbovlje	26	9	6	11	24	40	−16	33	
8	Bled	26	10	1	15	27	45	−18	31	
9	Jezero Medvode	26	7	9	10	32	40	−8	30	
10	Kolpa	26	9	3	14	26	43	−17	30	
11	Lesce	26	6	6	14	28	42	−14	24	
12	Komenda	26	7	3	16	29	55	−26	24	
13	Kočevje (R)	26	5	7	14	21	52	−31	22	Relegation to MNZ Ljubljana
14	Britof (R)	26	5	3	18	25	81	−56	18	Relegation to MNZG-Kranj

Source: MNZG-Kranj (in Slovene)
Rules for classification: 1) points; 2) points in head-to-head matches; 3) goal difference in head-to-head matches; 4) goals scored in head-to-head matches; 5) total goal difference; 6) total goals scored
(P) Promoted; (Q) Qualified for the phase indicated; (R) Relegated

== 3. SNL East ==
=== Clubs ===
Club	Location	Stadium	2013–14 position
Bakovci	Bakovci	ŠRC Bakovci	3rd, Murska Sobota
Beltinci	Beltinci	Beltinci Sports Park	5th
Bistrica	Srednja Bistrica	NK Bistrica Stadium	2nd, Lendava
Čarda	Martjanci	ŠRC Martjanci	14th
Črenšovci	Črenšovci	Črenšovci Sports Park	1st, Lendava
Grad	Grad	Igrišče Pod gradom	12th
Ljutomer	Ljutomer	Ljutomer Sports Park	8th
Mura	Murska Sobota	Fazanerija	2nd, Murska Sobota
Nafta 1903	Lendava	Lendava Sports Park	7th
Odranci	Odranci	ŠRC Odranci	3rd
Rakičan	Rakičan	Grajski Park Stadium	4th
Serdica	Serdica	Serdica Stadium	1st, Murska Sobota
Tromejnik	Kuzma	Kuzma Football Stadium	10th
Turnišče	Turnišče	Turnišče Stadium	3rd, Lendava

=== League table ===
Pos	Team	Pld	W	D	L	GF	GA	GD	Pts	Qualification or relegation
1	Odranci (Q)	26	19	3	4	75	30	+45	60	Qualification to Play-offs
2	Beltinci	26	17	4	5	84	30	+54	55	
3	Grad	26	14	6	6	60	36	+24	48	
4	Mura	26	15	3	8	54	28	+26	48	
5	Ljutomer	26	14	4	8	49	35	+14	46	
6	Tromejnik	26	14	4	8	46	36	+10	46	
7	Turnišče	26	14	2	10	54	45	+9	44	
8	Rakičan	26	12	7	7	51	36	+15	43	
9	Nafta 1903	26	10	8	8	40	43	−3	38	
10	Čarda	26	8	5	13	35	49	−14	29	
11	Črenšovci	26	4	7	15	32	58	−26	19	
12	Bakovci	26	4	3	19	18	73	−55	15	
13	Bistrica (R)	26	3	5	18	39	75	−36	14	Relegation to MNZ Lendava
14	Serdica (R)	26	1	5	20	17	80	−63	8	Relegation to MNZ Murska Sobota

Source: MNZ Murska Sobota (in Slovene)
Rules for classification: 1) points; 2) points in head-to-head matches; 3) goal difference in head-to-head matches; 4) goals scored in head-to-head matches; 5) total goal difference; 6) total goals scored
(Q) Qualified for the phase indicated; (R) Relegated

== 3. SNL North ==
=== Clubs ===
Club	Location	Stadium	2013–14 position
Bistrica	Slovenska Bistrica	Slovenska Bistrica Sports Park	13th
Drava	Ptuj	Ptuj City Stadium	2nd
Dravograd	Dravograd	Dravograd Sports Centre	2nd, Styrian
Fužinar	Ravne na Koroškem	City Stadium	1st, Styrian
Korotan	Prevalje	Stadion na Prevaljah	1st, MNZ Maribor
Lenart	Lenart	ŠRC Polena	3rd, Styrian
Malečnik	Malečnik	Berl Sports Centre	9th
Maribor B	Maribor	Tabor Sports Park	N/A^{1}
Mons Claudius	Rogatec	Rogatec Sports Centre	5th, Styrian
Podvinci	Podvinci	Podvinci Stadium	3rd, Ptuj
Radlje	Radlje ob Dravi	Radlje ob Dravi Stadium	4th, Styrian
Šampion	Celje	Olimp	9th, 2. SNL
Šentjur	Šentjur	Šentjur Sports Park	11th
Šmarje	Šmarje pri Jelšah	Sports Park	6th

^{1 Stojnci and Videm declined promotion.}

=== League table ===
Pos	Team	Pld	W	D	L	GF	GA	GD	Pts	Qualification or relegation
1	Maribor B	26	22	1	3	80	25	+55	67	Ineligible for promotion (Note: Maribor B are ineligible for promotion because their main squad, Maribor, plays in the top division.)
2	Drava Ptuj (Q, P)	26	19	4	3	82	29	+53	61	Qualification to Play-offs
3	Podvinci	26	13	4	9	49	35	+14	43	
4	Dravograd	26	12	6	8	56	42	+14	42	
5	Šmarje pri Jelšah	26	12	4	10	45	36	+9	40	
6	Fužinar	26	10	10	6	39	35	+4	40	
7	Šampion	26	12	2	12	66	49	+17	38	
8	Mons Claudius	26	12	2	12	37	61	−24	38	
9	Radlje	26	10	5	11	50	44	+6	35	
10	Lenart	26	11	0	15	41	50	−9	33	
11	Šentjur (R)	26	9	4	13	39	59	−20	31	Relegation to MNZ Celje (Note: Šentjur are relegated because Šmartno 1928 and Dravinja finished as the bottom-placed teams during the 2014–15 Slovenian Second League and will both be relegated to the 3. SNL North.)
12	Korotan Prevalje (R)	26	9	2	15	42	50	−8	29	Relegation to MNZ Maribor
13	Bistrica (R)	26	4	1	21	22	71	−49	13	Relegation to MNZ Ptuj
14	Malečnik (R)	26	4	1	21	28	90	−62	13	Relegation to MNZ Maribor

Source: MNZ Maribor (in Slovene)
Rules for classification: 1) points; 2) points in head-to-head matches; 3) goal difference in head-to-head matches; 4) goals scored in head-to-head matches; 5) total goal difference; 6) total goals scored
(P) Promoted; (Q) Qualified for the phase indicated; (R) Relegated

== 3. SNL West ==
=== Clubs ===
Club	Location	Stadium	2013–14 position
Adria	Miren	Igrišče Pri Štantu	11th
Ajdovščina Škou	Ajdovščina	Ajdovščina Stadium	10th
Bilje	Bilje	Stadion V dolinci	1st, Littoral
Brda	Dobrovo	Vipolže Stadium	8th
Cerknica	Cerknica	Koleno Stadium	3rd, Littoral
Ilirska Bistrica	Ilirska Bistrica	Trnovo Sports Centre	4th, Littoral
Izola	Izola	Izola City Stadium	5th
Jadran	Dekani	Dekani Sports Park	7th
Portorož Piran	Piran	Pod Obzidjem Stadium	2nd, Littoral
Tabor	Sežana	Rajko Štolfa Stadium	9th

=== League table ===
Pos	Team	Pld	W	D	L	GF	GA	GD	Pts	Qualification or relegation
1	Ajdovščina Škou (Q)	25	17	6	2	63	24	+39	57	Qualification to Play-offs
2	Izola	25	16	6	3	73	30	+43	54	
3	Brda	25	12	7	6	46	36	+10	43	
4	Bilje	25	13	4	8	46	31	+15	43	
5	Jadran Dekani	25	9	7	9	43	43	0	34	
6	Tabor Sežana	25	7	9	9	44	46	−2	30	
7	Ilirska Bistrica	25	5	8	12	32	58	−26	23	
8	Adria	25	6	2	17	18	47	−29	20	
9	Cerknica	25	5	4	16	21	50	−29	19	
10	Portorož Piran (R)	9	0	1	8	4	25	−21	1	Relegation to MNZ Koper (Note: Portorož Piran withdrew from the competition after 14 rounds, due to financial reasons. Results of the first third of the competition (rounds 1–9) were recognized.)

Source: MNZ Nova Gorica (in Slovene)
Rules for classification: 1) points; 2) points in head-to-head matches; 3) goal difference in head-to-head matches; 4) goals scored in head-to-head matches; 5) total goal difference; 6) total goals scored
(Q) Qualified for the phase indicated; (R) Relegated

== Play-offs ==
=== First leg ===
13 June 2015	Ajdovščina Škou	1–1	Zarica Kranj	Ajdovščina, Slovenia
18:00 CET	Lazarević 79'	Report (in Slovene)	Šujica 9'	Stadium: Ajdovščina Stadium; Attendance: 800; Referee: Asmir Sagrković

13 June 2015	Drava Ptuj	2–0	Odranci	Ptuj, Slovenia
18:00 CET	Tisaj 11'; Šalamun 78'	Report (in Slovene)		Stadium: Ptuj City Stadium; Attendance: 700; Referee: Dragoslav Perić

=== Second leg ===
17 June 2015	Zarica Kranj	3–1 (4–2 agg.)	Ajdovščina Škou	Kranj, Slovenia
17:00 CET	Božičić 5'; Peternel 70'; Robnik 76'	Report (in Slovene)	Kadrija 65'	Stadium: Zarica Sports Park; Attendance: 700; Referee: Mitja Žganec

17 June 2015	Odranci	2–1 (2–3 agg.)	Drava Ptuj	Odranci, Slovenia
17:00 CET	Gostan 10', 44'	Report (in Slovene)	Tomažič Šeruga 89'	Stadium: ŠRC Odranci; Attendance: 750; Referee: Tadej Mežnar

Zarica Kranj and Drava Ptuj were promoted to the 2015–16 Slovenian Second League.

== See also ==
- 2014–15 Slovenian Second League
