= 2008–09 Slovenian Third League =

Slovenian Third League
- Season: 2008–09
- Champions: Dravinja (East); Šenčur (West)
- Promoted: Dravinja; Šenčur
- Relegated: Črenšovci; Šmarje pri Jelšah; Slovan; Korte; Tabor Sežana
- Goals: 1,149
- Top goalscorer: Januš Štante (19 goals)

The 2008–09 Slovenian Third League was the 17th season of the Slovenian Third League, the third highest level in the Slovenian football system.

== Clubs East ==
Club	Location	Stadium	2007–08 position
Čarda	Martjanci	ŠRC Martjanci	1st, Pomurska
Črenšovci	Črenšovci	Črenšovci Sports Park	7th
Dravinja	Slovenske Konjice	Dobrava Stadium	6th
Dravograd	Dravograd	Dravograd Sports Centre	3rd
Kovinar Štore	Štore	Na Lipi Stadium	12th
Malečnik	Malečnik	Berl Sports Centre	5th
Mons Claudius	Rogatec	Rogaška Slatina City Stadium	2nd, Styrian
Odranci	Odranci	ŠRC Odranci	8th
Paloma	Sladki Vrh	Sladki Vrh Sports Park	11th
Šampion	Celje	Olimp Stadium	1st, Styrian
Šmarje pri Jelšah	Šmarje pri Jelšah	Sports Park	9th
Šmartno 1928	Šmartno ob Paki	Šmartno Stadium	2nd
Stojnci	Stojnci	Stojnci Sports Park	10th
Veržej	Veržej	Čistina Stadium	4th

=== League standing ===
Pos	Team	Pld	W	D	L	GF	GA	GD	Pts	Promotion or relegation
1	Dravinja (C, P)	26	22	1	3	66	12	+54	67	Promotion to Slovenian Second League
2	Dravograd	26	17	3	6	60	30	+30	54	
3	Kovinar Štore	26	15	5	6	47	32	+15	50	
4	Odranci	26	14	5	7	43	30	+13	47	
5	Šmartno 1928	26	14	3	9	63	56	+7	45	
6	Stojnci	26	11	5	10	47	40	+7	38	
7	Šampion	26	11	4	11	45	45	0	37	
8	Veržej	26	9	7	10	44	44	0	34	
9	Malečnik	26	10	4	12	47	49	−2	34	
10	Paloma	26	8	3	15	33	53	−20	27	
11	Čarda	26	6	7	13	35	47	−12	25	
12	Mons Claudius	26	7	1	18	30	63	−33	22	
13	Črenšovci (R)	26	3	9	14	25	52	−27	18	Relegation to Slovenian Regional Leagues
14	Šmarje pri Jelšah (R)	26	5	3	18	35	67	−32	18	Relegation to Slovenian Regional Leagues

Source: MNZ Maribor
(C) Champions; (P) Promoted; (R) Relegated

== Clubs West ==
Club	Location	Stadium	2007–08 position
Adria	Miren	Igrišče Pri Štantu	11th
Brda	Dobrovo	Vipolže Stadium	7th
Dob	Dob	Dob Sports Park	12th
Jadran	Dekani	Dekani Sports Park	6th
Kamnik	Kamnik	Stadion Prijateljstva	1st, Ljubljana
Korte	Korte	Malija Stadium	10th
Kranj	Kranj	Zarica Sports Park	3rd
Krka	Novo Mesto	Portoval	10th, 2. SNL
Radomlje	Radomlje	Radomlje Sports Park	8th
Sava	Kranj	Stražišče Sports Park	1st, Carniolan
Slovan	Ljubljana	Kodeljevo Sports Park	9th
Šenčur	Šenčur	Šenčur Sports Park	2nd
Tabor Sežana	Sežana	Rajko Štolfa Stadium	1st, Littoral
Tolmin	Tolmin	Brajda Sports Park	4th

=== League standing ===
Pos	Team	Pld	W	D	L	GF	GA	GD	Pts	Promotion or relegation
1	Šenčur (C, P)	25	19	3	3	66	20	+46	60	Promotion to Slovenian Second League
2	Jadran Dekani	25	15	6	4	56	30	+26	51	
3	Radomlje	25	15	2	8	56	33	+23	47	
4	Krka	25	14	3	8	52	37	+15	45	
5	Brda	25	11	5	9	38	28	+10	38	
6	Kranj	25	11	5	9	36	26	+10	38	
7	Dob	25	8	8	9	41	40	+1	32	
8	Sava Kranj	25	9	4	12	33	48	−15	31	
9	Tolmin	25	8	4	13	33	37	−4	28	
10	Kamnik	25	7	6	12	27	40	−13	27	
11	Slovan (R)	25	8	3	14	29	58	−29	27	Relegation to Slovenian Regional Leagues
12	Adria	25	7	3	15	30	49	−19	24	
13	Korte (R)	25	6	5	14	25	45	−20	23	Relegation to Slovenian Regional Leagues
14	Tabor Sežana (R)	13	1	3	9	7	38	−31	6	Relegation to Slovenian Regional Leagues

(C) Champions; (P) Promoted; (R) Relegated

== See also ==
- 2008–09 Slovenian Second League
