= Rajko Rotman =

Slovenian footballer (born 1989)

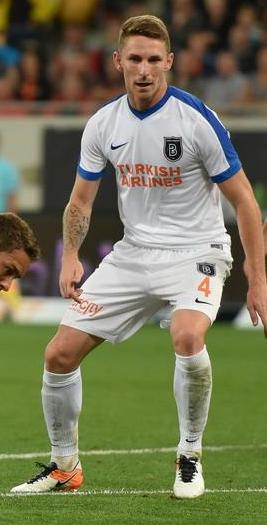

Personal information
- Date of birth: 19 March 1989 (age 37)
- Place of birth: Maribor, SFR Yugoslavia
- Height: 1.87 m (6 ft 2 in)
- Position: Midfielder

Youth career
- –2004: Maribor
- 2004–2008: Aluminij

Senior career*
Years	Team	Apps	(Gls)
2007–2011	Aluminij	66	(7)
2011–2014	Rudar Velenje	107	(11)
2014–2017	İstanbul Başakşehir	37	(0)
2017	→ Kayserispor (loan)	16	(1)
2017–2018	Göztepe	27	(1)
2018–2019	Kayserispor	10	(0)
2019–2021	Akhisar Belediyespor	51	(0)
2021–2023	Tuzlaspor	66	(0)
2023–2024	Sakaryaspor	33	(1)
2025	TuS Heiligenkreuz	12	(0)
2025–2026	Rače	21	(0)
Total		446	(21)

International career
2014–2018	Slovenia	15	(0)
- * Club domestic league appearances and goals

Rajko Rotman (born 19 March 1989) is a Slovenian former footballer who played as a midfielder.

== International career ==
Rotman made his debut for Slovenia in a June 2014 friendly match away against Uruguay and earned a total of 15 caps, scoring no goals.

== Career statistics ==
As of match played 11 March 2018

Appearances and goals by club, season and competition
Club	Season	League			National cup		Continental		Total	
Club	Season	Division	Apps	Goals	Apps	Goals	Apps	Goals	Apps	Goals
Aluminij	2007–08	Slovenian Second League	12	4	0	0	—		12	4
Aluminij	2008–09	Slovenian Second League	17	0	2	0	—		19	0
Aluminij	2009–10	Slovenian Second League	23	1	1	0	—		24	1
Aluminij	2010–11	Slovenian Second League	14	2	2	0	—		16	2
Aluminij	Total		66	7	5	0	0	0	71	7
Rudar Velenje	2010–11	Slovenian PrvaLiga	15	5	0	0	—		15	5
Rudar Velenje	2011–12	Slovenian PrvaLiga	26	1	5	2	—		31	3
Rudar Velenje	2012–13	Slovenian PrvaLiga	33	1	1	0	—		34	1
Rudar Velenje	2013–14	Slovenian PrvaLiga	33	4	6	3	—		39	7
Rudar Velenje	Total		107	11	12	5	0	0	119	16
İstanbul BB	2014–15	Süper Lig	21	0	4	0	—		25	0
İstanbul BB	2015–16	Süper Lig	16	0	9	1	0	0	25	1
İstanbul BB	2016–17	Süper Lig	0	0	3	0	1 (Note: Appearance in UEFA Europa League)	0	4	0
İstanbul BB	Total		37	0	16	1	1	0	54	1
Kayserispor (loan)	2016–17	Süper Lig	16	1	2	0	—		18	1
Göztepe	2017–18	Süper Lig	21	1	0	0	—		21	1
Career Total			247	20	35	6	1	0	283	26
