= Denis Popović =

Slovenian footballer (born 1989)

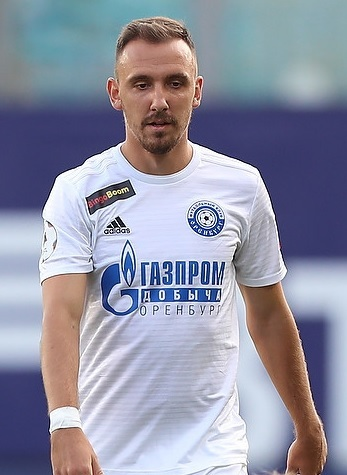
- Popović with Orenburg in 2018

Personal information
- Date of birth: 15 October 1989 (age 37)
- Place of birth: Celje, SFR Yugoslavia
- Height: 1.87 m (6 ft 2 in)
- Positions: Attacking midfielder; right winger

Youth career
- –2004: Celje
- 2004–2005: Zreče
- 2005–2008: Celje

Senior career*
Years	Team	Apps	(Gls)
2008−2012	Celje	57	(6)
2008−2010	→ MU Šentjur (loan)	30	(5)
2012−2013	Koper	32	(2)
2013−2014	Panthrakikos	3	(0)
2014	GKS Tychy	13	(7)
2014−2015	Olimpia Grudziądz	33	(7)
2015−2017	Wisła Kraków	46	(4)
2017–2019	Orenburg	60	(14)
2019–2020	Zürich	9	(0)
2020	Krylia Sovetov	10	(3)
2020–2021	Qingdao	13	(1)
2021–2022	Anorthosis Famagusta	21	(0)
2022−2024	Celje	50	(9)
2024−2025	Koper	25	(1)

International career
2019	Slovenia	6	(0)
- * Club domestic league appearances and goals as of 27 May 2025

Denis Popović (born 15 October 1989) is a Slovenian professional footballer. Primarily a central midfielder, he can also play as a right winger.

== Club career ==
=== FC Zürich ===
On 2 July 2019, Popović signed a three-year contract with Swiss club FC Zürich. He made twelve appearances for the club in all competitions during the 2019–20 season, before terminating his contract on 29 January 2020.

=== Krylia Sovetov Samara ===
On 2 February 2020, he returned to Russia and signed a two-and-a-half-year contract with Krylia Sovetov Samara. He left Krylia Sovetov on 20 August 2020.

=== Qingdao ===
On 30 August 2020, Popović joined Chinese Super League side Qingdao.

=== Anorthosis Famagusta ===
On 19 July 2021, Popović signed with Cypriot First Division club Anorthosis Famagusta on a two-year contract until 2023. His contract with Anorthosis was terminated by mutual consent on 26 August 2022.

== International career ==
Popović made his debut for Slovenia on 7 June 2019 in a Euro 2020 qualifier against Austria, coming in as a 63rd-minute substitute.

== Career statistics ==
As of match played 6 October 2024

Appearances and goals by club, season and competition
Club	Season	League			National cup (Note: Includes Slovenian Cup, Greek Cup, Polish Cup, Russian Cup, Swiss Cup, Chinese FA Cup, Cypriot Cup)		Continental		Other		Total	
Club	Season	Division	Apps	Goals	Apps	Goals	Apps	Goals	Apps	Goals	Apps	Goals
Celje	2008–09	Slovenian PrvaLiga	0	0	0	0	—		—		0	0
Celje	2009–10	Slovenian PrvaLiga	16	1	3	0	—		—		19	1
Celje	2010–11	Slovenian PrvaLiga	22	0	2	0	—		—		24	0
Celje	2011–12	Slovenian PrvaLiga	19	5	2	0	—		—		21	5
Celje	Total		57	6	7	0	0	0	0	0	64	6
MU Šentjur (loan)	2008–09	Slovenian Second League	14	0	1	1	—		—		15	1
MU Šentjur (loan)	2009–10	Slovenian Second League	16	5	0	0	—		—		16	5
MU Šentjur (loan)	Total		30	5	1	1	0	0	0	0	31	6
Koper	2011–12	Slovenian PrvaLiga	10	0	0	0	—		—		10	0
Koper	2012–13	Slovenian PrvaLiga	22	2	4	0	—		—		26	2
Koper	Total		32	2	4	0	0	0	0	0	36	2
Panthrakikos	2013–14	Super League Greece	3	0	2	0	—		—		5	0
GKS Tychy	2013–14	I liga	13	7	0	0	—		—		13	7
Olimpia Grudziądz	2014–15	I liga	33	7	0	0	—		—		33	7
Wisła Kraków	2015–16	Ekstraklasa	30	4	1	0	—		—		31	4
Wisła Kraków	2016–17	Ekstraklasa	16	0	3	1	—		—		19	1
Wisła Kraków	Total		46	4	4	1	0	0	0	0	50	5
Orenburg	2016–17	Russian Premier League	6	2	0	0	—		2 (Note: Appearances in the 2016–17 Russian Premier League relegation play-offs)	0	8	2
Orenburg	2017–18	Russian Football National League	30	10	2	0	—		—		32	10
Orenburg	2018–19	Russian Premier League	24	2	1	1	—		—		25	3
Orenburg	Total		60	14	3	1	0	0	2	0	65	15
FC Zürich	2019–20	Swiss Super League	9	0	2	0	—		—		11	0
Krylia Sovetov	2019–20	Russian Premier League	10	3	0	0	—		—		10	3
Qingdao	2020	Chinese Super League	9	1	1	0	—		—		10	1
Qingdao	2021	Chinese Super League	4	0	0	0	—		—		4	0
Qingdao	Total		13	1	1	0	0	0	0	0	14	1
Anorthosis	2021–22	Cypriot First Division	21	0	4	1	10 (Note: Two appearances in UEFA Europa League, eight appearances and two goals in UEFA Europa Conference League)	2	—		35	3
Celje	2022–23	Slovenian PrvaLiga	27	4	4	2	—		—		31	6
Celje	2023–24	Slovenian PrvaLiga	21	5	2	0	4 (Note: Appearances in UEFA Europa Conference League)	0	—		27	5
Celje	2024–25	Slovenian PrvaLiga	2	0	0	0	5 (Note: Four appearances in UEFA Champions League, one appearance in UEFA Europa League)	0	—		7	0
Celje	Total		50	9	6	2	9	0	0	0	65	11
Koper	2024–25	Slovenian PrvaLiga	4	0	1	0	—		—		5	0
Career total			381	58	35	6	19	2	2	0	437	66

== Honours ==
Orenburg

- Russian Football National League: 2017–18

Celje

- Slovenian PrvaLiga: 2023–24
