= 2010–11 Slovenian Third League =

Slovenian Third League
- Season: 2010–11
- Champions: Odranci (East); Radomlje (West)
- Promoted: Šampion; Radomlje
- Relegated: Ljubljana; MU Šentjur; Naklo; Portorož Piran; Sava Kranj
- Matches: 364
- Goals: 1,178 (3.24 per match)
- Top goalscorer: Boštjan Zelko (24 goals)

The season began on 21 August 2010 and ended on 11 June 2011.

== Clubs East ==
Club	Location	Stadium	2009–10 position
Bistrica	Slovenska Bistrica	Slovenska Bistrica Sports Park	1st, Styrian
Čarda	Martjanci	ŠRC Martjanci	4th
Dravograd	Dravograd	Dravograd Sports Centre	5th
Grad	Grad	Igrišče Pod gradom	1st, Pomurska
Kovinar Štore	Štore	Na Lipi Stadium	10th
Malečnik	Malečnik	Berl Sports Centre	6th
MU Šentjur	Šentjur	Šentjur Sports Park	10th, 2. SNL
Odranci	Odranci	ŠRC Odranci	7th
Paloma	Sladki Vrh	Sladki Vrh Sports Park	12th
Šampion	Celje	Olimp Stadium	2nd
Stojnci	Stojnci	Stojnci Sports Park	3rd
Tromejnik	Kuzma	Kuzma Football Stadium	11th
Veržej	Veržej	Čistina Stadium	8th
Zreče	Zreče	Zreče Stadium	9th

=== League standing ===
Pos	Team	Pld	W	D	L	GF	GA	GD	Pts	Promotion or relegation
1	Odranci (Note: Odranci declined promotion) (C)	26	18	5	3	64	30	+34	59	
2	Šampion (P)	26	16	6	4	64	25	+39	54	Promotion to Slovenian Second League
3	Čarda	26	11	7	8	43	35	+8	40	
4	Tromejnik	26	11	6	9	36	35	+1	39	
5	Dravograd	26	10	8	8	44	45	−1	38	
6	Kovinar Štore	26	11	5	10	41	39	+2	38	
7	Grad	26	9	8	9	39	38	+1	35	
8	Paloma	26	10	5	11	34	34	0	35	
9	Malečnik	26	9	6	11	36	44	−8	33	
10	Stojnci	26	9	5	12	39	50	−11	32	
11	Bistrica	26	8	5	13	40	47	−7	29	
12	Zreče	26	7	8	11	24	32	−8	29	
13	Veržej (Note: Veržej were spared from relegation for unknown reasons)	26	8	2	16	46	65	−19	26	
14	MU Šentjur (R)	26	5	4	17	29	60	−31	18 (Note: 1 point deducted.)	Relegation to Slovenian Regional League

Source: MNZ Ptuj
(C) Champions; (P) Promoted; (R) Relegated

== Clubs West ==
Club	Location	Stadium	2009–10 position
Adria	Miren	Igrišče Pri Štantu	1st
Ankaran Hrvatini	Ankaran	ŠRC Katarina	8th
Brda	Dobrovo	Vipolže Stadium	3rd
Jadran	Dekani	Dekani Sports Park	6th
Kamnik	Kamnik	Stadion Prijateljstva	9th
Kranj	Kranj	Zarica Sports Park	5th
Krka	Novo Mesto	Portoval	10th
Livar	Ivančna Gorica	Ivančna Gorica Stadium	9th, 2.SNL
Ljubljana	Ljubljana	ŽŠD Stadium	1st, Ljubljana
Naklo	Naklo	Arena Zmagovalcev	1st, Carniolan
Portorož Piran	Piran	Pod Obzidjem Stadium	1st, Littoral
Radomlje	Radomlje	Radomlje Sports Park	4th
Sava	Kranj	Stražišče Sports Park	11th
Tolmin	Tolmin	Brajda Sports Park	7th

=== League standing ===
Pos	Team	Pld	W	D	L	GF	GA	GD	Pts	Promotion or relegation
1	Radomlje (C, P)	26	19	5	2	48	15	+33	62	Promotion to Slovenian Second League
2	Jadran Dekani	26	16	3	7	53	30	+23	51	
3	Kamnik	26	15	5	6	50	29	+21	50	
4	Tolmin	26	12	10	4	50	31	+19	46	
5	Kranj	26	14	4	8	47	35	+12	46	
6	Krka	26	12	6	8	59	41	+18	42	
7	Ljubljana (R)	26	11	7	8	48	47	+1	40	Excluded
8	Ankaran Hrvatini	26	11	4	11	46	48	−2	37	
9	Ivančna Gorica	26	10	4	12	35	44	−9	34	
10	Adria	26	8	8	10	45	39	+6	32	
11	Brda	26	8	7	11	43	37	+6	31	
12	Portorož Piran (R)	26	6	6	14	44	74	−30	24	Excluded
13	Sava Kranj (R)	26	2	2	22	18	62	−44	8	Relegation to Slovenian Regional League
14	Naklo (R)	26	1	3	22	13	67	−54	6	Relegation to Slovenian Regional League

Source: MNZ Koper
(C) Champions; (P) Promoted; (R) Relegated

== See also ==
- 2010–11 Slovenian Second League
