= Jasmin Kurtić =

Slovenian footballer (born 1989)

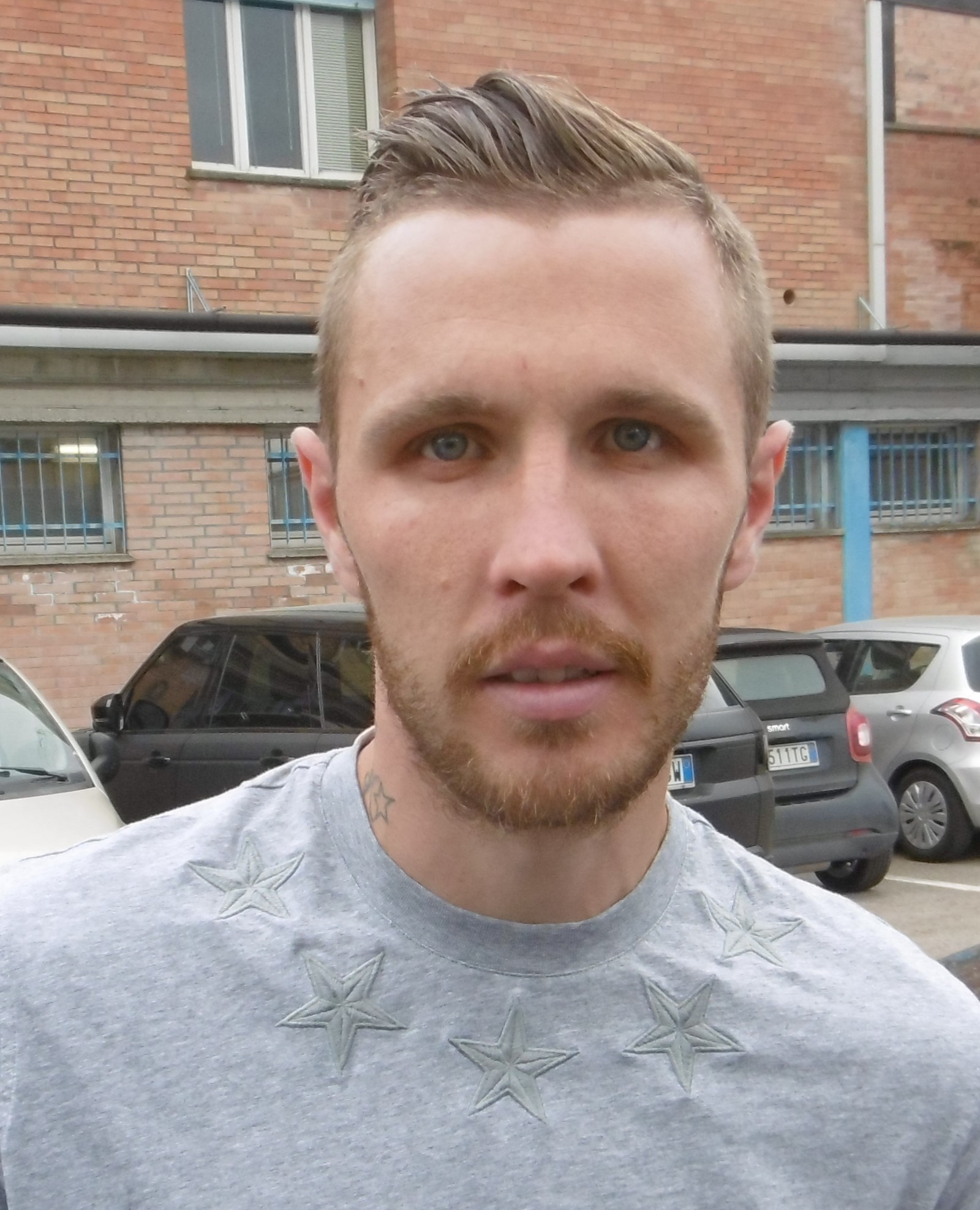
- Kurtić in 2018

Personal information
- Date of birth: 10 January 1989 (age 37)
- Place of birth: Črnomelj, SR Slovenia, Yugoslavia
- Height: 1.86 m (6 ft 1 in)
- Position: Midfielder

Team information
- Current team: Brinje Grosuplje
- Number: 27

Youth career
- 1999–2007: Bela Krajina

Senior career*
Years	Team	Apps	(Gls)
2007–2010	Bela Krajina	74	(7)
2010	Gorica	15	(0)
2011–2013	Palermo	35	(1)
2011–2012	→ Varese (loan)	38	(2)
2013–2015	Sassuolo	18	(0)
2014	→ Torino (loan)	16	(2)
2014–2015	→ Fiorentina (loan)	21	(1)
2015–2018	Atalanta	83	(10)
2018	→ SPAL (loan)	16	(1)
2018–2020	SPAL	46	(8)
2020	→ Parma (loan)	20	(2)
2020–2023	Parma	34	(4)
2021–2023	→ PAOK (loan)	41	(18)
2023–2024	Universitatea Craiova	15	(1)
2024–2025	Südtirol	26	(1)
2025–2026	Olimpija Ljubljana	10	(0)
2026–	Brinje Grosuplje	1	(0)

International career
2008–2009	Slovenia U20	4	(0)
2009	Slovenia U21	2	(0)
2012–2024	Slovenia	96	(2)
- * Club domestic league appearances and goals as of 26 July 2026

Jasmin Kurtić (born 10 January 1989) is a Slovenian professional footballer who plays as a midfielder for Brinje Grosuplje.

== Club career ==
=== Early career ===
A right-footed midfielder, Kurtić joined the 1. SNL club Gorica in August 2010 from the 2. SNL club Bela Krajina.

His stint at Gorica lasted only six months, as he was noted by scouts of Serie A club Palermo; on 18 December 2010 it was announced Kurtić had agreed a four-and-a-half-year contract with the Sicilians, effective from January 2011, thus making him the fourth Slovenian to join the club during the 2010–11 season.

On 12 January 2011, Kurtić made his Palermo debut in the Coppa Italia round of 16 game against Chievo; the match ended in a 1–0 win for Palermo. On 13 February 2011, Kurtić made his debut in Serie A, playing the whole 90 minutes against Fiorentina. On 10 April 2011, Kurtić scored his first goal in Serie A for Palermo against Cesena.

On 1 August 2011, he moved on loan to Varese in Serie B, with an option for his new club to acquire 50% of his transfer rights by the end of the season. He debuted for the team in Serie B on 27 August against Bari. For the 2012–13 season he returned to Palermo.

=== Sassuolo ===
On 1 July 2013, Kurtić moved to Sassuolo in a co-ownership deal. He made his Sassuolo debut in the third round of Coppa Italia away to Novara on 17 August 2013, as a starter.

==== Loan to Torino ====
On 30 January 2014, he moved to Torino on loan, also at the decision of Palermo, who owned half of his player rights. He scored his first goal for Torino on 19 April 2014 in the 34th round away to Lazio (3–3). During the season, Kurtić collected 16 appearances and scored two goals in the league.

On 20 June 2014, his co-ownership agreement between Palermo and Sassuolo was resolved in favour of Sassuolo.

==== Loan to Fiorentina ====
On 1 September 2014, he moved on loan to Fiorentina. He made his debut on 18 September in the UEFA Europa League match against Guingamp, and scored his first goal on 21 September against Atalanta.

=== Atalanta ===
On 25 June 2015, Kurtić was signed by Atalanta.

=== Parma ===
On 10 January 2020, Kurtić joined Parma on loan until the end of the 2019–20 season, at the end of which Parma was obligated to buy his rights. He signed a contract with the club until 30 June 2023.

==== Loan to PAOK ====
On 18 July 2021, Kurtić joined Super League Greece club PAOK on a two-year loan contract. On 23 January 2022, he became the second PAOK player, after Stavros Sarafis in 1972–73, to score in six consecutive league games.

=== Universitatea Craiova ===
On 8 August 2023, Kurtić joined Romanian club Universitatea Craiova on a one-year contract.

== International career ==
Kurtić was a member of the Slovenia under-21 team, appearing in two friendlies in 2009. He made his senior debut against Greece on 26 May 2012, where he also scored from a free kick.

== Career statistics ==
=== Club ===
As of 20 December 2023

Appearances and goals by club, season and competition
Club	Season	League			National cup (Note: Includes Slovenian Cup, Coppa Italia, Greek Cup, Cupa României)		Continental		Other		Total	
Club	Season	Division	Apps	Goals	Apps	Goals	Apps	Goals	Apps	Goals	Apps	Goals
Bela Krajina	2007–08	Slovenian Second League	27	3	2	0	—		—		29	3
Bela Krajina	2008–09	Slovenian Second League	22	2	1	0	—		—		23	2
Bela Krajina	2009–10	Slovenian Second League	25	2	1	0	—		—		26	2
Bela Krajina	Total		74	7	4	0	0	0	0	0	78	7
Gorica	2010–11	1. SNL	15	0	2	0	—		—		17	0
Palermo	2010–11	Serie A	4	1	1	0	—		—		5	1
Palermo	2012–13	Serie A	31	0	1	0	—		—		32	0
Palermo	Total		35	1	2	0	0	0	0	0	37	1
Varese (loan)	2011–12	Serie B	38	2	1	0	—		4 (Note: Appearances in Serie B promotion play-offs)	1	43	3
Sassuolo	2013–14	Serie A	18	0	2	0	—		—		20	0
Torino (loan)	2013–14	Serie A	16	2	—		—		—		16	2
Fiorentina (loan)	2014–15	Serie A	21	1	2	0	5 (Note: Appearances in UEFA Europa League)	0	—		28	1
Atalanta	2015–16	Serie A	32	2	2	0	—		—		34	2
Atalanta	2016–17	Serie A	37	6	2	0	—		—		39	6
Atalanta	2017–18	Serie A	14	2	1	0	4	0	—		19	2
Atalanta	Total		83	10	5	0	4	0	0	0	92	10
SPAL (loan)	2017–18	Serie A	16	1	0	0	—		—		16	1
SPAL	2018–19	Serie A	30	6	1	0	—		—		31	6
SPAL	2019–20	Serie A	16	2	2	0	—		—		18	2
SPAL	Total		62	9	3	0	0	0	0	0	65	9
Parma	2019–20	Serie A	20	2	1	0	—		—		21	2
Parma	2020–21	Serie A	34	4	2	0	—		—		36	4
Parma	Total		54	6	3	0	0	0	0	0	57	6
PAOK (loan)	2021–22	Super League Greece	31	15	7	2	13 (Note: Appearances in UEFA Europa Conference League)	1	—		51	18
PAOK (loan)	2022–23	Super League Greece	10	3	0	0	2	0	—		12	3
PAOK (loan)	Total		41	18	7	2	15	1	0	0	63	21
Universitatea Craiova	2023–24	Liga I	15	1	2	1	—		—		17	2
Career total			472	57	33	3	24	1	4	1	533	62

=== International ===
Appearances and goals by national team and year
National team	Year	Apps	Goals
Slovenia	2012	6	1
Slovenia	2013	9	0
Slovenia	2014	8	0
Slovenia	2015	7	0
Slovenia	2016	8	0
Slovenia	2017	5	0
Slovenia	2018	5	0
Slovenia	2019	10	0
Slovenia	2020	7	1
Slovenia	2021	9	0
Slovenia	2022	9	0
Slovenia	2023	6	0
Slovenia	2024	7	0
Total		96	2

Scores and results list Slovenia's goal tally first, score column indicates score after each Kurtić goal.

List of international goals scored by Jasmin Kurtić
No.	Date	Venue	Opponent	Score	Result	Competition
1	26 May 2012	Kufstein Arena, Kufstein, Austria	Greece	1–1	1–1	Friendly
2	15 November 2020	Stožice Stadium, Ljubljana, Slovenia	Kosovo	1–1	2–1	2020–21 UEFA Nations League C

== Honours ==
Palermo

- Coppa Italia runner-up: 2010–11

PAOK

- Greek Cup runner-up: 2021–22, 2022–23
