= 2008–09 Slovenian PrvaLiga =

Slovenian PrvaLiga
- Season: 2008–09
- Champions: Maribor (8th title)
- Relegated: Primorje
- Champions League: Maribor
- Europa League: Gorica; Rudar; Interblock (cup winners)
- Matches played: 180
- Goals scored: 468 (2.6 per match)
- Best Player: Marcos Tavares
- Top goalscorer: Etien Velikonja (17 goals)
- Biggest home win: Interblock 5–0 Nafta
- Biggest away win: Drava 0–4 Maribor
- Highest scoring: Gorica 3–5 Drava
- Longest winning run: 7 games Drava
- Longest unbeaten run: 12 games Maribor
- Longest winless run: 17 games Drava
- Longest losing run: 6 games Drava
- Highest attendance: 9,000; Maribor 1–0 Celje
- Lowest attendance: 150; Koper 3–2 Celje
- Total attendance: 215,830
- Average attendance: 1,199

The 2008–09 Slovenian PrvaLiga was the 18th season of top-tier football league in Slovenia. The competition was officially called PrvaLiga Telekom Slovenije for sponsorship reasons. The season started on 19 July 2008 and ended on 23 May 2009.

== Clubs ==
Location of teams in the 2008-09 Slovenian PrvaLiga

Club	Location	Stadium	Capacity
Celje	Celje	Arena Petrol	13,059
Domžale	Domžale	Sports Park	3,100
Drava Ptuj	Ptuj	City Stadium	2,200
Gorica	Nova Gorica	Sports Park	3,100
Interblock	Ljubljana	ŽŠD Ljubljana Stadium	3,986
Koper	Koper	Bonifika Stadium	4,500
Maribor	Maribor	Ljudski vrt	12,435
Nafta Lendava	Lendava	Sports Park	2,030
Primorje	Ajdovščina	Ajdovščina Stadium	3,000
Rudar Velenje	Velenje	Ob Jezeru	2,500

== Promotion and relegation ==
In the previous season, Livar were relegated to the Slovenian Second League after just one year in the top division, finishing last with only 17 points. Drava Ptuj successfully avoided relegation by beating Bonifika in the relegation play-offs.

Promoted to Slovenia's top football league were Second League champions Rudar Velenje, returning to PrvaLiga after a two-year absence.

== League table ==
Pos	Team	Pld	W	D	L	GF	GA	GD	Pts	Qualification or relegation
1	Maribor (C)	36	17	12	7	62	44	+18	63	Qualification to Champions League second qualifying round
2	Gorica	36	17	5	14	60	55	+5	56	Qualification to Europa League second qualifying round
3	Rudar	36	16	7	13	44	39	+5	55	Qualification to Europa League first qualifying round
4	Celje	36	15	8	13	48	39	+9	53	
5	Domžale	36	12	14	10	44	40	+4	50	
6	Interblock	36	13	8	15	52	51	+1	47	Qualification to Europa League third qualifying round (Note: Interblock won the 2008–09 Slovenian Football Cup and qualified for the third qualifying round of the UEFA Europa League.)
7	Nafta	36	11	10	15	36	52	−16	43	
8	Koper	36	10	12	14	39	47	−8	42 (Note: KOP: 6 pts, 7–6; DRA: 6 pts, 6–7)	
9	Drava Ptuj (O)	36	12	6	18	47	53	−6	42	Qualification to relegation play-offs
10	Primorje (R)	36	9	14	13	36	48	−12	41	Relegation to Slovenian Second League

Source: PrvaLiga (in Slovene)
Rules for classification: 1) points; 2) head-to-head points; 3) head-to-head goal difference; 4) head-to-head goals scored; 5) goal difference; 6) number of goals scored.
(C) Champions; (O) Play-off winners; (R) Relegated

=== Relegation play-offs ===
The ninth-placed team of the PrvaLiga, Drava Ptuj, played a two-legged relegation play-off against the runners-up of the 2008–09 Slovenian Second League, Aluminij.

31 May 2009
17:00 CEST

Aluminij	3–2	Drava
Dugolin 22'; Šimenko 45'; Milec 73'		da Silva 63', 82'

Aluminij Sports Park, Kidričevo
Attendance: 2,500
Referee: Damir Skomina
7 June 2009
17:00 CEST

Drava	7–0	Aluminij
Kronaveter 16', 27', 74'; Zilić 31', 58'; Čeh 68'; Drevenšek 80'

City Stadium, Ptuj
Attendance: 2,500
Referee: Dragoslav Perić

Drava Ptuj won 9–3 on aggregate.

== Results ==
Each team played four times against their opponents, twice at home and twice on the road, for a total of 36 matches.

=== First half of the season ===
Home \ Away	CEL	DOM	DRA	GOR	INT	KOP	MAR	NAF	PRI	RUD
Celje		0–0	1–0	3–2	0–0	2–1	3–3	2–1	2–2	2–0
Domžale	1–2		0–0	2–3	4–0	3–1	1–0	2–2	2–0	2–1
Drava Ptuj	0–2	3–0		5–1	1–2	2–1	0–4	1–0	1–1	0–1
Gorica	2–1	0–2	1–0		2–2	2–0	2–0	3–1	2–1	0–2
Interblock	1–1	0–0	1–2	2–0		1–2	1–2	3–1	2–0	2–1
Koper	1–0	1–1	3–1	1–3	1–4		1–1	1–1	1–1	1–1
Maribor	2–1	3–0	1–1	4–3	4–1	3–2		4–1	3–3	2–1
Nafta	1–0	1–0	2–0	1–0	3–0	2–0	1–1		1–0	1–1
Primorje	1–4	3–3	0–0	1–3	1–1	2–0	0–0	1–2		3–1
Rudar	2–2	1–0	3–0	2–1	2–0	5–1	1–2	0–0	0–1	

Source: PrvaLiga (in Slovene)
Legend: Blue = home team win; Yellow = draw; Red = away team win.

=== Second half of the season ===
Home \ Away	CEL	DOM	DRA	GOR	INT	KOP	MAR	NAF	PRI	RUD
Celje		0–1	1–3	1–2	1–0	1–2	1–1	2–0	3–0	2–1
Domžale	0–3		2–2	0–2	2–0	1–0	3–3	2–2	0–0	0–1
Drava Ptuj	0–2	0–2		2–2	2–1	1–2	2–1	4–1	0–1	2–0
Gorica	1–0	2–3	3–5		1–1	1–0	3–0	2–1	3–3	0–1
Interblock	2–0	0–2	3–2	1–2		1–1	4–1	5–0	3–1	0–1
Koper	3–2	0–0	1–2	3–1	3–0		0–0	3–0	1–0	0–1
Maribor	1–0	2–1	2–1	0–0	0–1	0–0		3–1	2–0	4–1
Nafta	0–0	0–0	1–0	1–4	3–3	1–1	1–0		2–0	0–1
Primorje	2–0	0–0	1–0	2–1	0–3	0–0	1–1	1–0		2–0
Rudar	0–1	2–2	3–2	1–0	2–1	0–0	1–2	2–0	1–1	

Source: PrvaLiga (in Slovene)
Legend: Blue = home team win; Yellow = draw; Red = away team win.

== Top goalscorers ==
Rank	Player	Club	Goals
1	(Slovenia) Etien Velikonja	Gorica	17
2	(Brazil) Marcos Tavares	Maribor	15
3	(Bosnia and Herzegovina) Edin Junuzović	Rudar Velenje	13
3	(Croatia) Dario Zahora	Interblock	13
5	(Slovenia) Darijo Biščan	Celje	11
5	(Slovenia) Jože Benko	Domžale	11
7	(Slovenia) Dalibor Volaš	Maribor	10
7	(Slovenia) Milan Osterc	Gorica	10
9	(Switzerland) Nezbedin Selimi	Primorje	9
9	(Slovenia) Josip Iličić	Interblock	9

Source: PrvaLiga.si (in Slovene)

== See also ==
- 2008 Slovenian Supercup
- 2008–09 Slovenian Football Cup
- 2008–09 Slovenian Second League
