= 1997–98 Slovenian Third League =

Slovenian Third League
- Season: 1997–98
- Champions: Pohorje (East); Tabor Sežana (West)
- Relegated: Naklo; Piran
- Goals: 1,099

The 1997–98 Slovenian Third League was the sixth season of the Slovenian Third League, the third highest level in the Slovenian football system.

== League standings ==
=== East ===
Pos	Team	Pld	W	D	L	GF	GA	GD	Pts	Promotion or qualification
1	Pohorje (C, P)	26	20	4	2	82	27	+55	64	Promotion to Slovenian Second League
2	Bakovci	26	20	3	3	71	28	+43	63	Qualification to Play-offs
3	Črenšovci	26	16	1	9	64	39	+25	49	
4	Paloma	26	14	4	8	58	32	+26	46	
5	Goričanka	26	11	7	8	50	43	+7	40	
6	Dravinja	26	10	4	12	40	53	−13	34	
7	Šoštanj	26	10	1	15	45	50	−5	31	
8	Odranci	26	8	7	11	41	47	−6	31	
9	Zreče	26	9	4	13	23	41	−18	31	
10	Pobrežje	26	8	5	13	32	60	−28	29	
11	Turnišče	26	6	9	11	42	48	−6	27	
12	Kungota	26	7	6	13	33	56	−23	27	
13	Gornji Lakoš	26	5	6	15	32	61	−29	21	
14	Kovinar Maribor	26	4	7	15	22	50	−28	19	

(C) Champions; (P) Promoted

=== West ===
Pos	Team	Pld	W	D	L	GF	GA	GD	Pts	Promotion or relegation
1	Tabor Sežana (C, P)	25	20	2	3	63	13	+50	62	Promotion to Slovenian Second League
2	Svoboda	25	11	9	5	41	21	+20	42	Qualification to Play-offs
3	Ankaran	25	12	4	9	37	27	+10	40	
4	Idrija	25	11	9	5	34	17	+17	37 (Note: 5 points deducted)	
5	Kolpa	25	10	5	10	44	36	+8	35	
6	Ilirska Bistrica	25	9	7	9	28	30	−2	34	
7	Bled	25	9	7	9	30	38	−8	34	
8	Brda	25	8	9	8	39	30	+9	33	
9	Branik Šmarje	25	9	6	10	37	43	−6	33	
10	Litija	25	7	5	13	26	52	−26	26	
11	Bilje	25	5	7	13	20	40	−20	22	
12	Komenda	25	5	6	14	23	42	−19	21	
13	Naklo Triglav (R)	25	4	2	19	22	67	−45	14	Relegation to Slovenian Regional Leagues
14	Piran (R)	13	8	4	1	20	8	+12	28	Relegation to Slovenian Regional Leagues

(C) Champions; (P) Promoted; (R) Relegated

== See also ==
- 1997–98 Slovenian Second League
