= Darijo =

Darijo is a Croatian given name, a variant spelling of Dario. Notable people with the name include:

- Darijo Biščan (born 1985), Croatian footballer
- Darijo Grujcic (born 1999), Austrian footballer
- Darijo Krišto (born 1989), Croatian footballer
- Darijo Pecirep (born 1991), Bosnian footballer
- Darijo Srna (born 1982), Croatian footballer
