= 2006–07 Slovenian Third League =

Slovenian Third League
- Season: 2006–07
- Champions: Zavrč (East); Krka (West)
- Relegated: Železničar Maribor; Tišina; Ihan; Svoboda; Kamnik
- Matches: 364
- Goals: 1,141 (3.13 per match)
- Top goalscorer: Boštjan Zelko; Dejan Kefert; Deni Žibernik; (all 19 goals)

The 2006–07 Slovenian Third League was the 15th season of the Slovenian Third League, the third highest level in the Slovenian football system.

== League standings ==
=== East ===
Pos	Team	Pld	W	D	L	GF	GA	GD	Pts	Promotion or relegation
1	Zavrč (C, P)	26	16	6	4	61	17	+44	54	Promotion to Slovenian Second League
2	Veržej	26	15	1	10	56	38	+18	46	
3	Šmarje pri Jelšah	26	13	6	7	49	41	+8	45	
4	Malečnik	26	13	4	9	41	32	+9	43	
5	Paloma	26	12	6	8	49	37	+12	42	
6	Kovinar Štore	26	13	3	10	32	34	−2	42	
7	Stojnci	26	12	4	10	38	45	−7	40	
8	Odranci	26	11	4	11	37	31	+6	37	
9	MU Šentjur	26	9	7	10	36	37	−1	34	
10	Črenšovci	26	10	4	12	41	46	−5	34	
11	Pohorje	26	10	3	13	34	37	−3	33	
12	Železničar Maribor (R)	26	9	2	15	32	50	−18	29	Relegation to Slovenian Regional Leagues
13	Dravograd	26	7	3	16	24	58	−34	24	
14	Tišina (R)	26	3	5	18	24	51	−27	14	Relegation to Slovenian Regional Leagues

Source: MNZ Murska Sobota
(C) Champions; (P) Promoted; (R) Relegated

=== West ===
Pos	Team	Pld	W	D	L	GF	GA	GD	Pts	Promotion or relegation
1	Krka (C, P)	26	16	4	6	63	37	+26	52	Promotion to Slovenian Second League
2	Radomlje	26	12	9	5	52	29	+23	45	
3	Ihan (R)	26	11	9	6	51	37	+14	42	Withdrew from the competition
4	Slovan	26	11	8	7	45	37	+8	41	
5	Dob	26	10	9	7	45	35	+10	39	
6	Jadran Dekani	26	10	9	7	40	33	+7	39	
7	Brda	26	8	11	7	36	34	+2	35	
8	Portorož Piran	26	7	11	8	40	39	+1	32	
9	Jesenice	26	9	4	13	34	58	−24	31	
10	Izola	26	7	8	11	37	48	−11	29	
11	Svoboda (R)	26	9	2	15	39	59	−20	29	Relegation to Slovenian Regional Leagues
12	Adria	26	6	10	10	34	47	−13	28	
13	Korte	26	6	7	13	31	47	−16	25	
14	Kamnik (R)	26	6	7	13	40	47	−7	25	Relegation to Slovenian Regional Leagues

Source: MNZ Nova Gorica
(C) Champions; (P) Promoted; (R) Relegated

== See also ==
- 2006–07 Slovenian Second League
