= 2000–01 Slovenian Second League =

Slovenian Second League
- Season: 2000–01
- Champions: Triglav Kranj
- Relegated: Beltinci; Šentjur; Renkovci
- Goals scored: 684
- Top goalscorer: Borut Arlič (22 goals)

The 2000–01 Slovenian Second League season started on 13 August 2000 and ended on 10 June 2001. Each team played a total of 29 matches.

== League standing ==
Pos	Team	Pld	W	D	L	GF	GA	GD	Pts	Promotion or relegation
1	Triglav Kranj (C, P)	29	22	4	3	68	19	+49	70	Promotion to Slovenian PrvaLiga
2	Šmartno (P)	29	19	5	5	60	31	+29	62	Promotion to Slovenian PrvaLiga
3	Aluminij	29	18	6	5	62	29	+33	60	
4	Jadran Hrpelje-Kozina	29	17	5	7	55	31	+24	56	
5	Krka	29	16	3	10	46	41	+5	51	
6	Dravinja	29	12	5	12	28	36	−8	41	
7	Ljubljana	29	11	7	11	50	40	+10	40	
8	Zagorje	29	10	7	12	36	33	+3	37	
9	Nafta Lendava	29	10	7	12	32	31	+1	37	
10	Železničar Maribor	29	10	7	12	40	49	−9	37	
11	Livar	29	11	3	15	45	50	−5	36	
12	Pohorje	29	8	7	14	28	54	−26	31	
13	Beltinci (R)	29	6	7	16	37	60	−23	25	Relegation to Slovenian Third League
14	Šentjur (R)	15	6	3	6	23	27	−4	21	Withdrew from the competition
15	Brda (Note: Brda merged with newly promoted Renče to avoid relegation.)	29	5	2	22	39	74	−35	17	
16	Renkovci (R)	29	3	4	22	35	79	−44	13	Relegation to Slovenian Third League

Source: NZS archive (in Slovene)
Rules for classification: 1) points; 2) goal difference; 3) number of goals scored.
(C) Champions; (P) Promoted; (R) Relegated

== See also ==
- 2000–01 Slovenian PrvaLiga
- 2000–01 Slovenian Third League
