= 2007–08 Slovenian Second League =

Slovenian Second League
- Season: 2007–08
- Champions: Rudar Velenje
- Relegated: Zavrč; Krka
- Matches: 135
- Goals: 395 (2.93 per match)
- Top goalscorer: Alen Mujanovič (21 goals)

The 2007–08 Slovenian Second League season started on 12 August 2007 and ended on 31 May 2008. Each team played a total of 27 matches.

== Clubs ==
Location of teams

Club	Location	Stadium
Aluminij	Kidričevo	Aluminij Sports Park
Bela Krajina	Črnomelj	ŠRC Loka
Bonifika	Koper	Izola City Stadium
Krka	Novo Mesto	Portoval
Krško	Krško	Matija Gubec Stadium
Mura 05	Murska Sobota	Fazanerija
Rudar Velenje	Velenje	Ob Jezeru Stadium
Triglav	Kranj	Stanko Mlakar Stadium
Zagorje	Zagorje ob Savi	Zagorje City Stadium
Zavrč	Zavrč	Zavrč Sports Park

== League standing ==
Pos	Team	Pld	W	D	L	GF	GA	GD	Pts	Promotion or relegation
1	Rudar Velenje (C, P)	27	15	5	7	70	31	+39	50	Promotion to Slovenian PrvaLiga
2	Bonifika	27	12	7	8	44	29	+15	43	Qualification to promotion play-offs
3	Bela Krajina	27	12	7	8	40	30	+10	43	
4	Aluminij	27	12	5	10	39	30	+9	41	
5	Mura 05	27	10	7	10	31	42	−11	37	
6	Krško	27	9	9	9	33	42	−9	36	
7	Zavrč (R)	27	10	6	11	36	35	+1	36	Withdrew from the competition
8	Zagorje	27	9	8	10	43	45	−2	35	
9	Triglav Kranj	27	10	5	12	36	40	−4	35	
10	Krka (R)	27	4	5	18	23	71	−48	17	Relegation to Slovenian Third League

Source: Soccerway, NZS archive (in Slovene)
(C) Champions; (P) Promoted; (R) Relegated

== See also ==
- 2007–08 Slovenian PrvaLiga
- 2007–08 Slovenian Third League
