= Marko Božič (Slovenian footballer) =

Slovenian footballer

Personal information
- Date of birth: 7 February 1984 (age 42)
- Place of birth: Koper, SFR Yugoslavia
- Height: 1.91 m (6 ft 3 in)
- Position: Midfielder

Youth career
- Izola
- 2002: Koper

Senior career*
Years	Team	Apps	(Gls)
2001–2004	Koper	31	(8)
2001–2003	→ Jadran Šepič (loan)	20	(7)
2004–2005	Mura	25	(2)
2005–2006	Treviso		
2006–2007	Koper	32	(3)
2007–2008	Rad	9	(1)
2008	Bonifika	12	(1)
2009	Domžale	10	(0)
2009	Mura	10	(2)
2010–2014	Ivančna Gorica	46	(8)
2015–2016	Izola	35	(2)

International career
2001	Slovenia U17	14	(3)
2003–2005	Slovenia U20	8	(1)
2003–2004	Slovenia U21	7	(2)
- * Club domestic league appearances and goals

Marko Božič (born 7 February 1984) is a retired Slovenian footballer who played as a midfielder.

== Club career ==
Božič played for Mura and Koper in Slovenia. He played both legs of UEFA Cup qualification for Koper that season, before went to FK Rad of Serbia on 5 September 2007.

== International career ==
He was called up for a friendly match against Serbia and Montenegro on 18 August 2004, but did not play in the match. He was capped for Slovenia U21 in 2004 and 2006. At U19 level, he was in the squad of Slovenian U19 team entered the second qualifying round of the 2003 UEFA European Under-19 Football Championship.
