= Aleš Poplatnik =

Slovenian footballer (born 1987)

Personal information
- Date of birth: 25 June 1987 (age 39)
- Place of birth: SFR Yugoslavia
- Height: 1.76 m (5 ft 9 in)
- Position: Forward

Team information
- Current team: Ivančna Gorica

Youth career
- –2003: Factor
- 2003–2004: Domžale

Senior career*
Years	Team	Apps	(Gls)
2006	Svoboda	5	(0)
2007–2008	Zarica Kranj	22	(23)
2008–2009	Olimpija Ljubljana	10	(2)
2010	Zarica Kranj	12	(9)
2010	Šenčur	2	(0)
2010–2012	Zarica Kranj	37	(15)
2012–2015	Triglav Kranj	59	(10)
2016	FC Alpe Adria	11	(3)
2016	Zarica Kranj	11	(2)
2017	SK Kühnsdorf	13	(3)
2017–2018	SV Ludmannsdorf	44	(16)
2019–2022	SC-Reichenau/Falkert	62	(28)
2022–2024	Škofja Loka	47	(10)
2026–	Ivančna Gorica		
- * Club domestic league appearances and goals

Aleš Poplatnik (born 25 June 1987) is a Slovenian footballer who plays as a forward for Ivančna Gorica.

== Personal life ==
His younger brother, Matej Poplatnik, is also a professional footballer.
