= András Ballai =

Hungarian footballer

Personal information
- Full name: Andrśs Ballai
- Date of birth: 1964 (age 61–62)
- Place of birth: Hungary
- Position: Midfielder

Senior career*
Years	Team	Apps	(Gls)
1987–1989	Zalaegerszegi TE	15	(0)
1991–1992	Zalaegerszegi TE	5	(0)
1992–1993	Nafta Lendava	4	(0)
- * Club domestic league appearances and goals

András Ballai (born 1964) is a retired Hungarian footballer.

== Club career ==
Ballai played with Zalaegerszegi TE in Nemzeti Bajnokság I in 1987/88, 1988/89 and 1991/92 and later in Slovenian First League with NK Nafta Lendava in 1992/93.
