= Edin Osmanović =

Slovenian footballer & manager (born 1964)

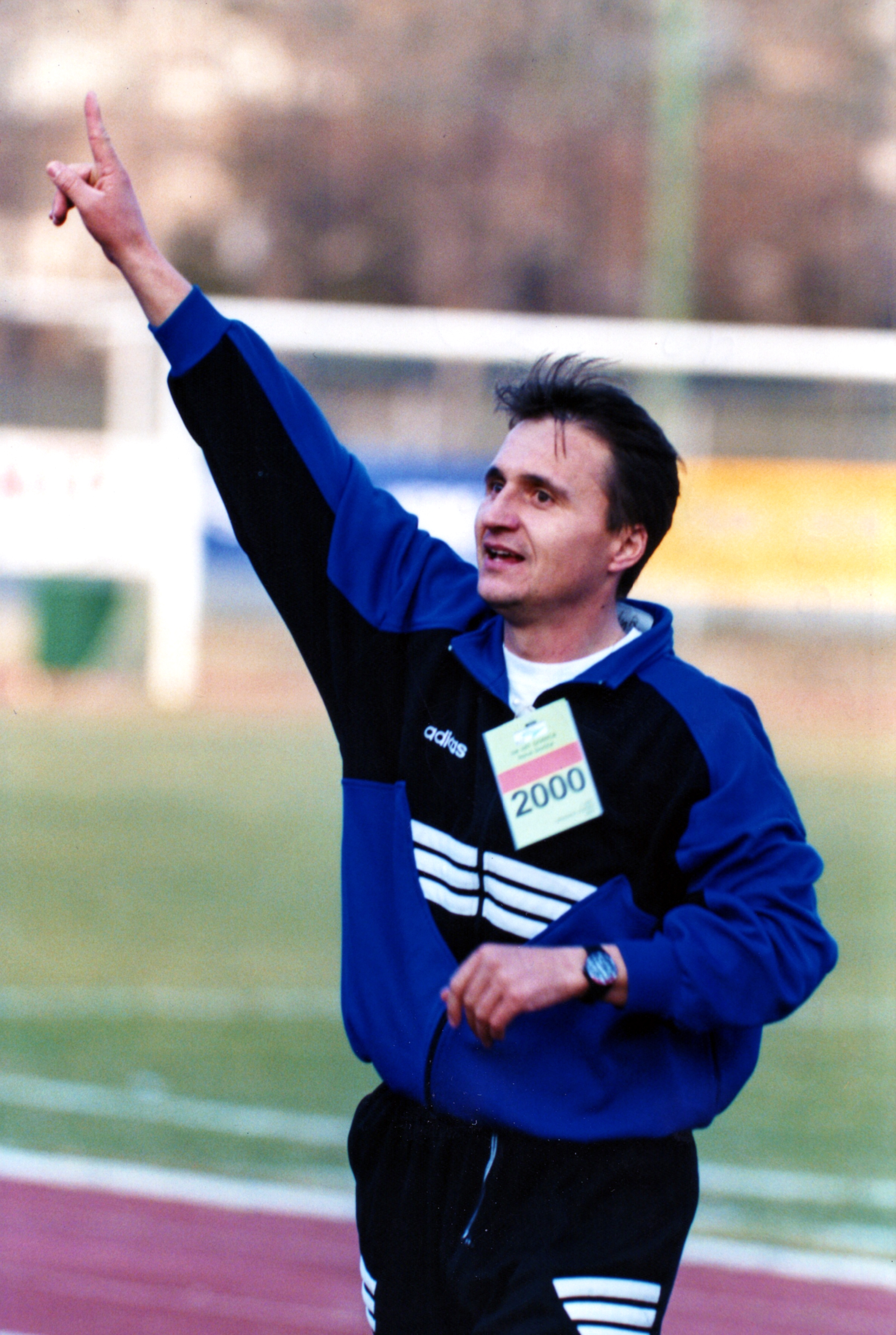
- Osmanović with ND Gorica in 2000

Personal information
- Date of birth: 20 May 1964 (age 62)
- Place of birth: Srebrenik, SR Bosnia and Herzegovina, SFR Yugoslavia
- Height: 1.79 m (5 ft 10 in)
- Position: Defensive midfielder

Youth career
- 1978–1982: Zagorje

Senior career*
Years	Team	Apps	(Gls)
1982–1992	Zagorje		

Managerial career
- 1995–1997: Rudar Trbovlje
- 1997–1998: Celje (Assistant manager)
- 1998–1999: Celje
- 1999–2001: Gorica
- 2001–2002: Rudar Velenje
- 2002–2003: Korotan Prevalje
- 2003–2004: Dravograd
- 2004–2006: Aluminij
- 2007–2010: Mura 05
- 2013: Aluminij
- 2017–2018: Fužinar
- * Club domestic league appearances and goals

Edin Osmanović (born 20 May 1964) is a Slovenian football manager and former player. He began his career in Rudar Trbovlje and later coached many clubs in the Slovenian PrvaLiga, the highest level in Slovenian football, including Celje, Gorica, Rudar Velenje, Korotan Prevalje, Dravograd, Aluminij, and Mura 05.

Osmanović spent all of his playing career at Zagorje, formerly known as Proletarec, with whom he was the champion and thus qualified for the first season of the Slovenian PrvaLiga after Slovenia gained independence. With Gorica, he became the runner-up of the 1999–2000 season of the Slovenian PrvaLiga, entered the semi-finals of the 1999–2000 Slovenian Football Cup and played four matches in the UEFA Europa League, formerly known as the UEFA Cup, making it one of the club's most successful seasons. With Korotan, he won the Winter Futsal All Star League 2003 and entered the semi-finals of the 2002–03 Slovenian Football Cup. With Dravograd, he became the runner-up of the 2003–04 Slovenian Football Cup. He also worked with other managers, including Stanko Poklepović, to whom he was the assistant coach at Celje before taking over the position of head coach after Poklepović's departure from the club. He was also one of the first ten managers from Slovenia to receive the UEFA Pro coaching licence.

== Career ==
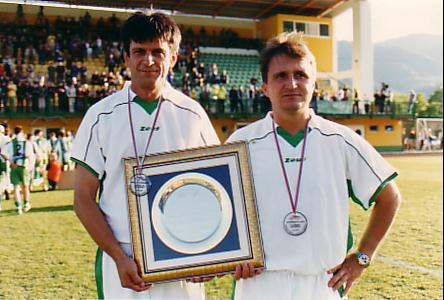
Osmanović (right) and assistant Obrad Mudrinić receiving runner-up award for Dravograd's placement in the 2004 Slovenian Football Cup finals.

Osmanović began his football career playing for Zagorje. During his years at Zagorje, Osmanović won the West division of the Slovenian Second League in the 1990–91 season, earning a spot in the inaugural season of the Slovenian PrvaLiga. Before the 1992–93 season began, he left Zagorje and started his managerial career. After receiving his Slovenian Pro License in 1994, Osmanović started his managing Rudar Trbovlje. Later he became the assistant coach to Stanko Poklepović in Celje in 1997, and replaced Poklepović in 1998 as the head manager. With Gorica, Osmanović was the runner-up of Slovenian PrvaLiga, and went to the UEFA Europa League. He brought Gorica to the semi-finals of the Slovenian Football Cup.

In 2001, Osmanović switched from Gorica to Rudar Velenje, and in 2002, took over Korotan Prevalje, with whom he became the champion of the Winter Futsal All Star League 2003 and qualified for the semi-finals of the Slovenian Football Cup. In 2003, Osmanović went to Dravograd. With Dravograd, he was the runner-up of the Slovenian Football Cup after his team lost the first match against Maribor, he won the second match, with a score of 4–3. He stayed in the club until 2004.

In 2004, Osmanović entered Aluminij, where he worked until 2006. He went to Mura 05 in 2007, where he stayed until 2010. In 2013, Osmanović returned to Aluminij. With the club, he entered the semi-finals of the Slovenian Football Cup. In the 2017–18 season, Osmanović worked as the head coach of Fužinar.

== List of clubs ==
Club	From	To	Position
Rudar Trbovlje	1995	1997	Head coach
Celje	1997	1998	Assistant coach (of Stanko Poklepović)
Celje	1998	1999	Head coach
Gorica	1999	2001	Head coach
Rudar Velenje	2001	2002	Head coach
Korotan Prevalje	2002	2003	Head coach
Dravograd	2003	2004	Head coach
Aluminij	2004	2006	Head coach
Mura 05	2007	2010	Head coach
Aluminij	2013	2013	Head coach
Fužinar	2017	2018	Head coach

== Honours ==
=== Player ===
Zagorje

- Slovenian Second Football League (West)
  - Champion: 1990–91

=== Manager ===
Gorica

- Slovenian PrvaLiga
  - Runner-up: 1999–2000

Dravograd

- Slovenian Football Cup
  - Runner-up: 2003–04

== Education and qualifications ==
Osmanović has a UEFA Pro Licence, which is the highest football licence in Europe. He has also graduated from the Faculty of Sport (DIF) in Ljubljana.

Licence	Year
Slovenian A Licence	1989
Slovenian Pro Licence	1994
UEFA Pro Licence	2003
