= NK Šmarje pri Jelšah =

Slovenian football club

Šmarje pri Jelšah
- Full name: Nogometni klub Šmarje pri Jelšah
- Founded: 1942; 84 years ago
- Ground: Jelše Sports Park
- President: Aleš Ratej
- League: Intercommunal League
- 2025–26: Intercommunal League, 8th of 8
- Website: nk-smarje.si
Home colours	Away colours

Nogometni klub Šmarje pri Jelšah (English: Šmarje pri Jelšah Football Club), commonly referred to as NK Šmarje pri Jelšah, is a Slovenian football club based in the town of Šmarje pri Jelšah. The club was established in 1942. As of the 2024–25 season, they play in the Celje Intercommunal League, the fourth highest league in Slovenia.

== Honours ==
- Slovenian Fourth Division
  - Winners: 2000–01, 2011–12
- MNZ Celje Cup
  - Winners: 2011–12

== League history since 1995 ==
Season	League	Position
1995–96	MNZ Celje (level 4)	8th
1996–97	MNZ Celje (level 4)	9th
1997–98	MNZ Celje (level 4)	8th
1998–99	MNZ Celje (level 4)	7th
1999–2000	MNZ Celje (level 4)	4th
2000–01	MNZ Celje (level 4)	1st
2001–02	3. SNL – North	8th
2002–03	3. SNL – North	5th
2003–04	3. SNL – North	6th
2004–05	3. SNL – East	12th
2005–06	3. SNL – East	8th
2006–07	3. SNL – East	3rd
2007–08	3. SNL – East	9th
2008–09	3. SNL – East	14th
2009–10	Styrian League	6th
2010–11	Styrian League	3rd
2011–12	Styrian League	1st
2012–13	3. SNL – East	3rd
2013–14	3. SNL – East	6th

Season	League	Position
2014–15	3. SNL – North	5th
2015–16	3. SNL – North	5th
2016–17	3. SNL – North	7th
2017–18	3. SNL – North	14th
2018–19	MNZ Celje (level 4)	3rd
2019–20	MNZ Celje (level 4)	1st
2020–21	3. SNL – East	12th
2021–22	3. SNL – East	13th
2022–23	MNZ Celje (level 4)	8th
2023–24	MNZ Celje (level 4)	6th
2024–25	MNZ Celje (level 4)	7th
2025–26	MNZ Celje (level 4)	8th
