= Janez Perme =

Slovenian footballer (born 1982)

Personal information
- Date of birth: 12 April 1982 (age 44)
- Place of birth: Ljubljana, SFR Yugoslavia
- Height: 1.83 m (6 ft 0 in)
- Position: Forward

Youth career
- 1989–2000: Livar

Senior career*
Years	Team	Apps	(Gls)
2000–2008	Livar	195	(68)
2009–2010	Domžale	34	(9)
2010	Bela Krajina	13	(4)
2011	Krka		
2011–2014	Ivančna Gorica		
- * Club domestic league appearances and goals

Janez Perme (born 12 April 1982) is a Slovenian former footballer who played as a forward.

== Career ==
Perme began playing football in 1989 in the youth system of Livar from Ivančna Gorica. He spent most of his career there, though he also played for Domžale, Bela Krajina, and Krka. During the 2007–08 season—Livar's only year in the top flight—he finished as the club's top scorer. Overall, he made 60 appearances and scored 18 goals in the Slovenian PrvaLiga.

== Honours ==
- Slovenian Second League: 2006–07
