= ND Mura 05 =

Mura 05
- Full name: Nogometno društvo Mura 05
- Nicknames: Črno-beli (The Black and Whites)
- Founded: 16 June 2005; 21 years ago
- Dissolved: 2013; 13 years ago
- Ground: Fazanerija
- Capacity: 3,782
Home colours	Away colours

Nogometno društvo Mura 05, commonly referred to as ND Mura 05 or simply Mura 05, was a Slovenian football club from the town of Murska Sobota. The club was established on 16 June 2005. The club's home ground was Fazanerija City Stadium. During the summer of 2013, Mura 05 were declared bankrupt and dissolved months after the 2012–13 season, after they had spent two successive seasons in the top division.

== History ==
ND Mura 05 was founded on 16 June 2005. The club emerged after the dissolution of NK Mura, a club which played in the Slovenian PrvaLiga for many years, but went bankrupt and was dissolved in 2005. However, ND Mura 05 is legally not considered to be the successor of NK Mura and the statistics and honours of the two clubs are kept separate by the Football Association of Slovenia.

Mura 05 finished the 2010–11 Slovenian Second League in fourth place, behind Aluminij, Interblock and Dravinja. However, all three clubs declined promotion to the Slovenian PrvaLiga due to financial reasons. As the next club on the league table, Mura 05 received and accepted an invitation to join the top division. Although the main goal of the season was to stay in the top division, Mura 05 exceeded their expectations and finished the 2011–12 Slovenian PrvaLiga in third place, gaining the right to play in the UEFA Europa League in the next season. After the 2012–13 season, the club went into the financial difficulties again and was dissolved. The newly established club used its youth selections to register a team for the 2013–14 season under the name NŠ Mura.

== Honours ==
- Slovenian Third League
  - Winners: 2005–06

== League history ==
Season	League	Position	Notes
2005–06	3. SNL – East	1st	Promoted to Slovenian Second League
2006–07	2. SNL	7th	/
2007–08	2. SNL	5th	/
2008–09	2. SNL	4th	/
2009–10	2. SNL	6th	/
2010–11	2. SNL	4th	Promoted to Slovenian PrvaLiga
2011–12	1. SNL	3rd	Qualified for UEFA Europa League
2012–13	1. SNL	9th	Club dissolved

== European record ==
Summary

Competition	Record					
Competition	G	W	D	L	GF	GA
UEFA Europa League	8	2	3	3	7	8

Matches

All results (home and away) list Mura's goal tally first.

Season	Competition	Round	Club	Home	Away	Agg.
2012–13	UEFA Europa League	1QR	(Azerbaijan) Baku	2–0	0–0	2–0
2012–13	UEFA Europa League	2QR	(Bulgaria) CSKA Sofia	0–0	1–1	1–1 (a)
2012–13	UEFA Europa League	3QR	(Ukraine) Arsenal Kyiv	0–2	3–0 (Note: UEFA awarded Mura 05 a 3–0 win due to Arsenal Kyiv fielding suspended player Éric Matoukou in the first leg. The original match had ended in a 3–0 win for Arsenal Kyiv.)	3–2
2012–13	UEFA Europa League	PO	(Italy) Lazio	0–2	1–3	1–5

== Managers ==
- (Slovenia) Edin Osmanović (2007–2008)
- (Slovenia) Primoz Gliha (2009–2010)
- (Slovenia) Robert Pevnik (2011)
- (Slovenia) Ante Šimundža (2011–2012)
- (Slovenia) Franc Cifer (interim) (2012)
- (Slovenia) Oliver Bogatinov (2012–2013)
- (Slovenia) Ante Šimundža (2013)
