= Željko Mitraković =

Slovenian footballer

Personal information
- Date of birth: 30 December 1972 (age 53)
- Place of birth: Ljubljana, SFR Yugoslavia
- Height: 1.87 m (6 ft 2 in)
- Position: Midfielder

Senior career*
Years	Team	Apps	(Gls)
1991–1994	Svoboda	82	(8)
1996–2000	Gorica	102	(15)
2000	Lokeren	14	(1)
2000–2002	Primorje	54	(4)
2002–2004	Domžale	68	(14)
2005	Ethnikos Achnas	10	(2)
2005	Livar	9	(1)
2006	FC Großklein	14	(6)
2006–2008	Bela Krajina	54	(10)
2008–2009	Olimpija Ljubljana	24	(3)
2009–2010	Triglav Kranj	23	(0)
2010–2011	Bela Krajina	13	(5)
2011	Dob	24	(2)
2012	FC Großklein	14	(0)
2012–2014	Kresnice	42	(12)
2015	SAK Klagenfurt	12	(0)
2015–2017	SV Oberdrauburg	43	(14)
2018–2019	Dragomer	14	(0)
Total		616	(97)

International career
1992	Slovenia U21	1	(0)
1998–2004	Slovenia	7	(0)

Managerial career
- 2012: Svoboda
- 2014: Dob
- 2018: Ilirija 1911
- 2018–2019: Sava Kranj
- 2021: Brežice 1919
- 2022: Rudar Velenje
- * Club domestic league appearances and goals

Željko Mitraković (born 30 December 1972) is a Slovenian football manager and former player.

Between 1998 and 2004, Mitraković earned seven appearances for the Slovenia national team.
