= NK Brda =

Association football club in Slovenia

Brda
- Full name: Nogometni klub Brda Dobrovo
- Nickname: Vinarji (The Winegrowers)
- Founded: 1973; 53 years ago
- Ground: Vipolže Sports Park
- President: Marjan Simčič
- League: Littoral League
- 2025–26: Littoral League, 6th of 11
- Website: www.nkbrda.si
Home colours	Away colours

Nogometni klub Brda Dobrovo (English: Brda Dobrovo Football Club), commonly referred to as NK Brda or simply Brda, is a Slovenian football club based in Dobrovo that competes in the Littoral League, the fourth highest league in Slovenia. The club was founded in 1973.

== Honours ==
- Slovenian Third League

Winners: 1999–2000, 2015–16

- MNZ Nova Gorica Cup

Winners: 2011–12, 2012–13, 2013–14, 2014–15, 2015–16, 2016–17, 2018–19

== League history since 1991 ==
Season	League	Position
1991–92	2. SNL – West	9th
1992–93	3. SNL – West	3rd
1993–94	3. SNL – West	5th
1994–95	3. SNL – West	8th
1995–96	3. SNL – West	9th
1996–97	3. SNL – West	5th
1997–98	3. SNL – West	8th
1998–99	3. SNL – West	5th
1999–2000	3. SNL – West	1st
2000–01	2. SNL	15th
2001–02	2. SNL	12th
2002–03	2. SNL	12th
2003–04	2. SNL	11th
2004–05	3. SNL – West	6th
2005–06	3. SNL – West	2nd
2006–07	3. SNL – West	7th
2007–08	3. SNL – West	7th
2008–09	3. SNL – West	5th
2009–10	3. SNL – West	3rd

Season	League	Position
2010–11	3. SNL – West	11th
2011–12	3. SNL – West	9th
2012–13	3. SNL – West	7th
2013–14	3. SNL – West	8th
2014–15	3. SNL – West	3rd
2015–16	3. SNL – West	1st
2016–17	2. SNL	6th
2017–18	2. SNL	9th
2018–19	2. SNL	12th
2019–20	2. SNL	13th
2020–21	2. SNL	16th
2021–22	3. SNL – West	12th
2022–23	3. SNL – West	8th
2023–24	3. SNL – West	14th
2024–25	Littoral League	9th
2025–26	Littoral League	6th
