= NK Kovinar Štore =

Slovenian football club

Kovinar Štore
- Full name: Nogometni klub Kovinar Štore
- Founded: 1930; 95 years ago
- Ground: Na Lipi Stadium
Home colours	Away colours

Nogometni klub Kovinar Štore (English: Kovinar Štore Football Club), commonly referred to as NK Kovinar Štore or simply Kovinar, is a Slovenian football club which plays in the town of Štore. The club was founded in 1930.

== Honours ==
- Slovenian Fourth Division
  - Winners: 2003–04

== League history since 1991 ==
Season	League	Position
1991–92	MNZ Celje (level 3)	4th (Note: With the establishment of the Slovenian Third League, they effectively dropped to fourth level.)
1992–93	MNZ Celje (level 4)	8th
1993–94	MNZ Celje (level 4)	6th
1994–95	MNZ Celje (level 4)	3rd
1995–96	MNZ Celje (level 4)	6th
1996–97	MNZ Celje (level 4)	7th
1997–98	MNZ Celje (level 4)	7th
1998–99	MNZ Celje (level 4)	2nd
1999–2000	MNZ Celje (level 4)	2nd
2000–01	MNZ Celje (level 4)	2nd
2001–02	MNZ Celje (level 4)	(Note: Withdrew after four rounds.)
2002–03	MNZ Celje (level 4)	4th
2003–04	MNZ Celje (level 4)	1st
2004–05	3. SNL – East	9th
2005–06	3. SNL – East	2nd
2006–07	3. SNL – East	6th
2007–08	3. SNL – East	12th
2008–09	3. SNL – East	3rd
2009–10	3. SNL – East	10th
2010–11	3. SNL – East	6th
2011–12	3. SNL – East	8th
2012–13	3. SNL – East	14th
2013–14	Styrian League (level 4)	11th (Note: Styrian League discontinued. Transferred to MNZ Celje league.)
2014–15	MNZ Celje (level 4)	4th
2015–16	MNZ Celje (level 4)	8th
2016–17	MNZ Celje (level 4)	8th
