= 2006–07 Slovenian Second League =

Slovenian Second League
- Season: 2006–07
- Champions: Livar
- Relegated: Šenčur; Dravinja
- Matches: 135
- Goals: 358 (2.65 per match)
- Top goalscorer: Dejan Božičič; Dalibor Volaš (14 goals)

The 2006–07 Slovenian Second League season started on 13 August 2006 and ended on 27 May 2007. Each team played a total of 27 matches.

== League standing ==
Pos	Team	Pld	W	D	L	GF	GA	GD	Pts	Promotion or relegation
1	Livar (C, P)	27	13	6	8	37	36	+1	45	Promotion to Slovenian PrvaLiga
2	Bonifika	27	12	6	9	46	39	+7	42	Qualification to promotion play-offs
3	Krško	27	11	6	10	38	43	−5	39	
4	Triglav Kranj	27	10	9	8	29	24	+5	39	
5	Zagorje	27	9	10	8	37	30	+7	37	
6	Aluminij	27	10	7	10	29	29	0	37	
7	Mura 05	27	8	10	9	37	37	0	34	
8	Rudar Velenje	27	9	7	11	44	41	+3	34	
9	Šenčur (R)	27	9	6	12	35	41	−6	33	Relegation to Slovenian Third League
10	Dravinja (R)	27	9	3	15	26	38	−12	30	Relegation to Slovenian Third League

Source: Soccerway, NZS archive (in Slovene)
(C) Champions; (P) Promoted; (R) Relegated

== See also ==
- 2006–07 Slovenian PrvaLiga
- 2006–07 Slovenian Third League
