= Darijo Biščan =

Croatian footballer

Personal information
- Full name: Darijo Biščan
- Date of birth: 26 August 1985 (age 41)
- Place of birth: SFR Yugoslavia
- Position: Striker

Team information
- Current team: SU Semriach
- Number: 22

Senior career*
Years	Team	Apps	(Gls)
2004–2005	Livar		
2005–2010	Celje	111	(31)
2010	Koper	10	(0)
2010–2011	Bela Krajina	12	(8)
2011	Bylis Ballsh	6	(0)
2011–2016	SAK Klagenfurt	130	(72)
2016	ASV Klagenfurt	13	(4)
2016-2019	FC Großklein	86	(90)
2020	FC Lannach	9	(5)
2021-2023	SAK Klagenfurt	58	(27)
2023-	SU Semriach		
- * Club domestic league appearances and goals as of 10 August 2023

Darijo Biščan (born 26 August 1985) is a Slovenian football striker who plays for SU Semriach in the Austrian lower leagues.
