= 2008–09 Slovenian Second League =

Slovenian Second League
- Season: 2008–09
- Champions: Olimpija
- Promoted: Olimpija
- Relegated: Bonifika; Zagorje
- Goals: 431
- Top goalscorer: Dejan Burgar (16 goals)

The 2008–09 Slovenian Second League season started on 10 August 2008 and ended on 24 May 2009. Each team played a total of 26 matches.

== Clubs ==
Location of teams

Club	Location	Stadium
Aluminij	Kidričevo	Aluminij Sports Park
Bela Krajina	Črnomelj	ŠRC Loka
Bonifika	Izola	Izola City Stadium
Krško	Krško	Matija Gubec Stadium
Livar	Ivančna Gorica	Ivančna Gorica Stadium
MU Šentjur	Šentjur	Šentjur Sports Park
Mura 05	Murska Sobota	Fazanerija
Olimpija	Ljubljana	ŽŠD Ljubljana
Triglav	Kranj	Stanko Mlakar Stadium
Zagorje	Zagorje ob Savi	Zagorje City Stadium

== League standing ==
Pos	Team	Pld	W	D	L	GF	GA	GD	Pts	Promotion or relegation
1	Olimpija (C, P)	26	17	5	4	69	25	+44	56	Promotion to Slovenian PrvaLiga
2	Aluminij (Q)	26	15	4	7	65	40	+25	49	Qualification to promotion play-offs
3	Triglav Kranj	26	12	7	7	46	42	+4	43	
4	Mura 05	26	9	9	8	56	49	+7	36	
5	MU Šentjur	26	9	8	9	38	47	−9	35	
6	Krško	26	8	9	9	40	47	−7	33	
7	Bela Krajina	26	8	7	11	34	40	−6	31	
8	Livar	26	7	9	10	34	40	−6	30	
9	Bonifika (R)	18	5	3	10	32	30	+2	18	Withdrew from the competition
10	Zagorje (R)	26	2	7	17	17	71	−54	13	Relegation to Slovenian Third League

Source: Soccerway, NZS archive (in Slovene)
(C) Champions; (P) Promoted; (Q) Qualified for the phase indicated; (R) Relegated

== See also ==
- 2008–09 Slovenian PrvaLiga
- 2008–09 Slovenian Third League
