= Saša Božičič =

Slovenian footballer

Personal information
- Full name: Saša Božičič
- Date of birth: 8 May 1983 (age 43)
- Place of birth: Izola, SFR Yugoslavia
- Height: 1.80 m (5 ft 11 in)
- Position: Midfielder

Youth career
- 1990–1999: NK Izola
- 2000: Perugia Calcio
- 2000–2001: Izola

Senior career*
Years	Team	Apps	(Gls)
2001–2004	Koper	31	(1)
2002–2003	Izola	22	(8)
2004–2005	Maribor	34	(0)
2006	Primorje	15	(0)
2006–2010	Koper	148	(15)
2011	Primorje	15	(1)
2011–2012	Krka		
2012–2013	Izola		
2013–2018	Vesna		
2018–2019	Sistiana		
- * Club domestic league appearances and goals as of 20:06, 7 July 2011 (UTC)

Saša Božičič (born 8 May 1983) is a Slovenian footballer.

He had a spell with Italian amateur side Sistiana in 2018/19.
