= Nezbedin Selimi =

Swiss-Albanian footballer (born 1984)

Personal information
- Date of birth: 6 October 1984 (age 42)
- Place of birth: Gostivar, Yugoslavia
- Height: 1.80 m (5 ft 11 in)
- Positions: Forward; attacking midfielder

Senior career*
Years	Team	Apps	(Gls)
2003–2004	Wil 1900	1	(0)
2004–2005	Frauenfeld		
2005–2006	St. Gallen U21		
2006–2007	Berliner AK 07	12	(7)
2007–2008	La Chaux-de-Fonds	21	(4)
2008–2009	NK Primorje		(9)
2010	Rudar Velenje	13	(4)
2010–2011	KF Laçi	40	(9)
2012	Flamurtari Vlorë	8	(2)
- * Club domestic league appearances and goals

Nezbedin Selimi (born 6 October 1984) is a Swiss former professional footballer who played as a forward or attacking midfielder.
