= NK Šentjur =

Slovenian football club

Šentjur
- Full name: Nogometni klub Šentjur
- Founded: 2000; 26 years ago (as DNŠ Mladi upi Šentjur)
- Ground: Šentjur Sports Park
- President: Jernej Leskovar
Home colours	Away colours

Nogometni klub Šentjur (English: Šentjur Football Club), commonly referred to as NK Šentjur or simply Šentjur, is a Slovenian football club based in Šentjur. The club was founded in 2000 and is legally not considered to be the successor of the old NK Šentjur.

== Honours ==
- Slovenian Third League
  - Winners: 2007–08
- Styrian League (fourth tier)
  - Winners: 2005–06, 2012–13
- MNZ Celje Cup
  - Winners: 2007–08

== League history ==
Season	League	Position
2001–02	MNZ Celje (level 4)	3rd
2002–03	MNZ Celje (level 4)	7th
2003–04	MNZ Celje (level 4)	5th (Note: Transferred to a newly established Styrian League.)
2004–05	Styrian League (level 4)	4th
2005–06	Styrian League (level 4)	1st
2006–07	3. SNL – East	9th
2007–08	3. SNL – East	1st
2008–09	2. SNL	5th
2009–10	2. SNL	10th
2010–11	3. SNL – East	14th
2011–12	Styrian League (level 4)	10th
2012–13	Styrian League (level 4)	1st
2013–14	3. SNL – East	11th
2014–15	3. SNL – North	11th
2015–16	MNZ Celje (level 4)	6th
2016–17	MNZ Celje (level 4)	2nd
2017–18	3. SNL – North	11th
2018–19	MNZ Celje (level 4)	7th
2019–20	—N/a	
2020–21	MNZ Celje (level 4)	6th
2021–22	MNZ Celje (level 4)	8th
