= 2009–10 Slovenian Second League =

Slovenian Second League
- Season: 2009–10
- Champions: Primorje
- Promoted: Primorje; Triglav Kranj
- Relegated: Livar; MU Šentjur
- Matches: 135
- Goals: 373 (2.76 per match)
- Top goalscorer: Darko Kremenovič (15 goals)

The 2009–10 Slovenian Second League season started on 9 August 2009 and ended on 23 May 2010. Each team played a total of 27 matches.

== Clubs ==
Location of teams

Club	Location	Stadium
Aluminij	Kidričevo	Aluminij Sports Park
Bela Krajina	Črnomelj	ŠRC Loka
Dravinja	Slovenske Konjice	Dobrava Stadium
Krško	Krško	Matija Gubec Stadium
Livar	Ivančna Gorica	Ivančna Gorica Stadium
MU Šentjur	Šentjur	Šentjur Sports Park
Mura 05	Murska Sobota	Fazanerija
Primorje	Ajdovščina	Ajdovščina Football Stadium
Šenčur	Šenčur	Šenčur Sports Park
Triglav	Kranj	Stanko Mlakar Stadium

== League table ==
Pos	Team	Pld	W	D	L	GF	GA	GD	Pts	Promotion or relegation
1	Primorje (C, P)	27	15	10	2	51	16	+35	55	Promotion to Slovenian PrvaLiga
2	Triglav Kranj (P)	27	14	5	8	33	25	+8	47	Qualification to promotion play-offs
3	Aluminij	27	14	4	9	67	34	+33	46	
4	Dravinja	27	11	6	10	44	32	+12	39	
4	Bela Krajina	27	11	6	10	28	36	−8	39	
6	Mura 05	27	9	7	11	36	51	−15	34	
7	Šenčur	27	7	11	9	31	35	−4	32	
8	Krško	27	6	10	11	27	45	−18	28	
9	Livar (R)	27	7	6	14	27	43	−16	27	Relegation to Slovenian Third League
10	MU Šentjur (R)	27	5	7	15	29	56	−27	22	Relegation to Slovenian Third League

Source: Soccerway, NZS archive (in Slovene)
(C) Champions; (P) Promoted; (R) Relegated

== Results ==
=== First and second round ===
Home \ Away	ALU	BEL	DRA	KRŠ	LIV	ŠNT	MUR	PRI	ŠEN	TRI
Aluminij		0–1	0–3	2–1	0–2	7–0	0–1	0–2	0–3	1–0
Bela Krajina	0–4		1–0	1–1	1–0	3–1	3–1	1–1	1–1	0–2
Dravinja	5–0	3–0		2–0	1–1	2–1	2–2	0–3	1–3	0–2
Krško	1–0	0–3	0–0		0–3	0–5	3–2	1–4	0–2	0–0
Livar	0–2	2–1	0–3	1–1		1–0	1–2	0–1	0–1	0–3
MU Šentjur	1–1	6–1	1–0	1–1	3–3		1–2	0–3	0–0	0–1
Mura 05	1–1	0–3	1–1	1–0	5–0	1–0		1–1	1–1	5–0
Primorje	1–0	3–0	3–1	2–0	0–0	4–0	8–0		3–1	0–1
Šenčur	0–6	0–1	0–1	1–1	0–1	0–2	1–1	0–0		0–2
Triglav Kranj	3–3	0–1	1–0	1–0	1–0	5–0	2–1	0–0	1–1	

Source: NZS
Legend: Blue = home team win; Yellow = draw; Red = away team win.

=== Third round ===
Home \ Away	ALU	BEL	DRA	KRŠ	LIV	ŠNT	MUR	PRI	ŠEN	TRI
Aluminij						7–0	4–1		4–1	6–1
Bela Krajina	1–1			1–1	1–0		0–1	0–1		
Dravinja	1–2	4–0		1–5	1–1			0–0		
Krško	3–8				2–1	1–1			1–1	
Livar	0–4					3–2	3–0			0–2
MU Šentjur		1–2	1–5					0–0	0–2	
Mura 05			3–1	1–3		1–1			0–6	0–2
Primorje	1–4			0–0	4–2		3–1			1–1
Šenčur		1–1	0–3		2–2			2–2		
Triglav Kranj		1–0	1–3	0–1		0–1			0–1	

Source: NZS
Legend: Blue = home team win; Yellow = draw; Red = away team win.

== See also ==
- 2009–10 Slovenian PrvaLiga
- 2009–10 Slovenian Third League
