= ND Dravinja =

Slovenian football club

Dravinja
- Full name: Nogometno društvo Dravinja
- Founded: 1934; 92 years ago
- Ground: Dobrava Stadium
- President: Goran Furman
- Head coach: Almir Sulejmanović
- League: Slovenian Second League
- 2025–26: Slovenian Second League, 7th of 16
- Website: nd-dravinja.si
Home colours	Away colours

Nogometno društvo Dravinja, commonly referred to as ND Dravinja or simply Dravinja, is a Slovenian football club based in Slovenske Konjice that competes in the Slovenian Second League, the second tier of Slovenian football. The club was founded in 1934.

== Honours ==
- Slovenian Second League
  - Runners-up: 2005–06
- Slovenian Third League
  - Winners: 1999–2000, 2008–09, 2013–14, 2022–23
  - Runners-up: 2018–19, 2021–22
- MNZ Celje Cup
  - Winners: 2006–07

== League history since 1991 ==
Season	League	Position
1991–92	2. SNL – East	5th
1992–93	2. SNL	12th
1993–94	2. SNL	10th
1994–95	2. SNL	12th
1995–96	3. SNL – East	10th
1996–97	3. SNL – East	10th
1997–98	3. SNL – East	6th
1998–99	3. SNL – North	10th
1999–2000	3. SNL – North	1st
2000–01	2. SNL	6th
2001–02	2. SNL	7th
2002–03	2. SNL	7th
2003–04	2. SNL	4th
2004–05	2. SNL	4th
2005–06	2. SNL	2nd (Note: Lost promotion play-offs.)
2006–07	2. SNL	10th
2007–08	3. SNL – East	6th
2008–09	3. SNL – East	1st
2009–10	2. SNL	4th

Season	League	Position
2010–11	2. SNL	3rd
2011–12	2. SNL	8th
2012–13	2. SNL	10th
2013–14	3. SNL – East	1st
2014–15	2. SNL	9th
2015–16	3. SNL – North	11th
2016–17	3. SNL – North	8th
2017–18	3. SNL – North	3rd
2018–19	3. SNL – North	2nd
2019–20	3. SNL – East	3rd
2020–21	3. SNL – East	4th
2021–22	3. SNL – East	2nd
2022–23	3. SNL – East	1st
2023–24	2. SNL	11th
2024–25	2. SNL	7th
2025–26	2. SNL	7th
