= Korte, Izola =

Korte Dvori nad Izolo (1957–1988)
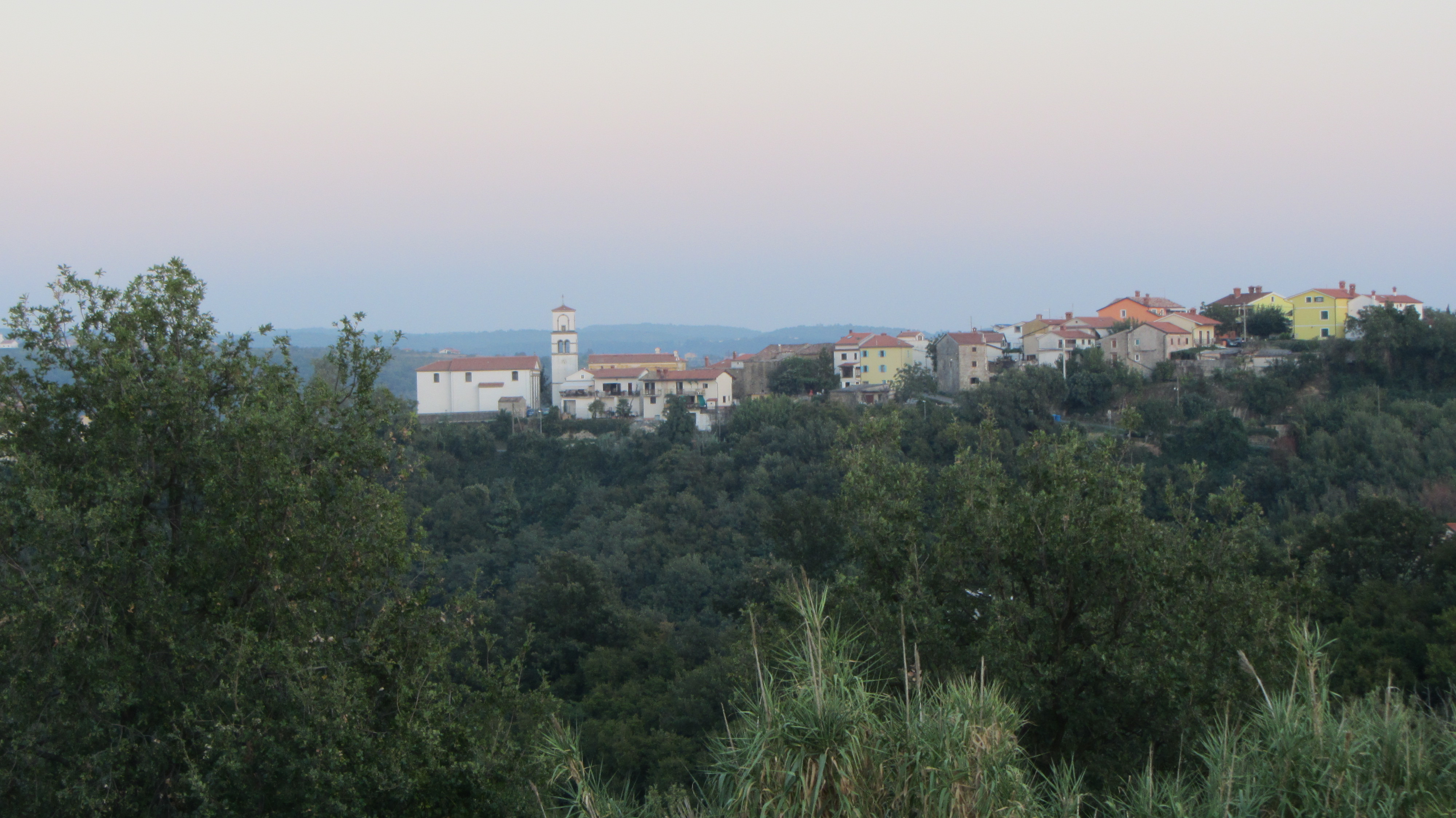

- Location in Slovenia
- Coordinates: 45°29′19.87″N 13°39′23.98″E
- Country: Slovenia
- Traditional region: Littoral
- Statistical region: Coastal–Karst
- Municipality: Izola

Area
  - Total: 4.95 km^{2} (1.91 sq mi)
- Elevation: 201.5 m (661 ft)

Population (2002)
  - Total: 655

Korte (pronounced [ˈkoːɾtɛ]; Italian: Corte d'Isola) is a village in the Municipality of Izola in the Littoral region of Slovenia.

== Name ==
The name of the settlement was changed from Korte to Dvori nad Izolo in 1957. The name was changed on the basis of the 1948 Law on Names of Settlements and Designations of Squares, Streets, and Buildings as part of efforts by Slovenia's postwar communist government to remove Italian elements from toponyms. The name Korte was restored in 1988.

== Church ==
The local church is dedicated to Saint Anthony the Hermit.

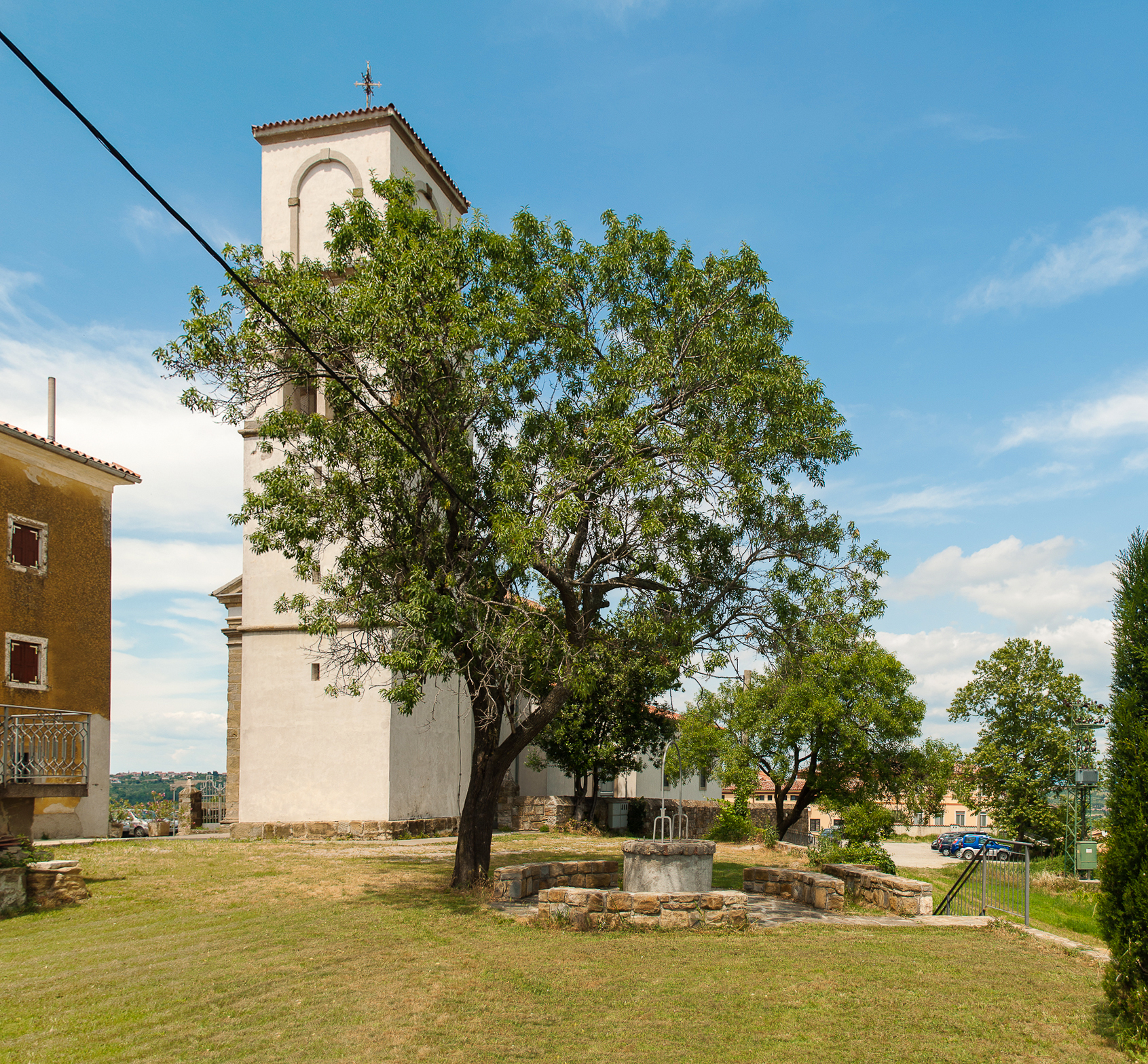
St. Anthony the Hermit Church, courtyard

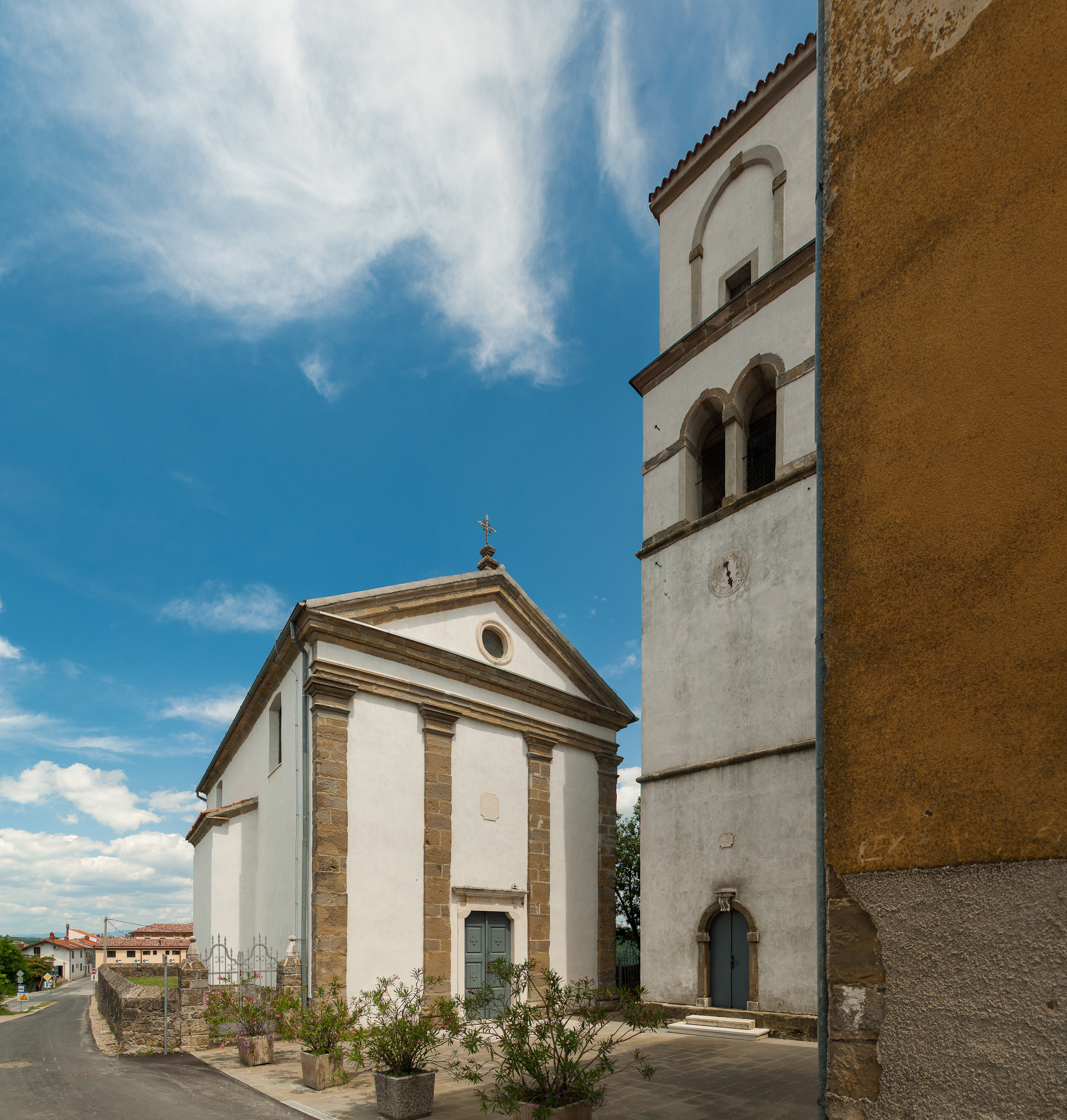
St. Anthony the Hermit Church
