= Stojnci =

- Location in Slovenia
- Coordinates: 46°22′54.32″N 15°58′24.68″E
- Country: Slovenia
- Traditional region: Styria
- Statistical region: Drava
- Municipality: Markovci

Area
  - Total: 4.87 km^{2} (1.88 sq mi)
- Elevation: 211 m (692 ft)

Population (2002)
  - Total: 847

Stojnci (pronounced [ˈstoːi̯ntsi], German: Steindorf) is a settlement in the Municipality of Markovci in northeastern Slovenia. It was first mentioned in written documents dating to 1286 as Stoyndorf. The area is part of the traditional region of Styria. It is now included with the rest of the municipality in the Drava Statistical Region.
