= Loka Stadium =

Multi-purpose stadium in Črnomelj, Slovenia

- Stadion Loka
- Interactive map of Loka Stadium
- Full name: Sports and Recreation Centre Loka (Športno rekreacijski center Loka)
- Location: Črnomelj, Slovenia
- Coordinates: 45°33′59.4″N 15°11′25.8″E
- Owner: Municipality of Črnomelj
- Operator: Športna zveza Črnomelj
- Capacity: 1,517
- Surface: Grass

Construction
- Built: 1955
- Renovated: 2001

Tenants
- NK Bela Krajina (until 2016); NŠ Bela Krajina (since 2016)

Loka Stadium (Slovene: Stadion Loka) or ŠRC Loka (Slovene: Športno rekreacijski center Loka) is a multi-use stadium in Črnomelj, Slovenia. It is used mostly for football matches and was the home ground of the former Slovenian First League side NK Bela Krajina until their disbandment in 2016. Since then, it has been used by their phoenix club NŠ Bela Krajina. The stadium holds 1,517 spectators. The original stadium opened in 1955, and the current one was built in 2001. It is the largest stadium in White Carniola.

== See also ==
- List of football stadiums in Slovenia
