= Ajdovščina Stadium =

Multi-purpose stadium in Ajdovščina, Slovenia

Ajdovščina City Stadium
- Interactive map of Ajdovščina City Stadium
- Full name: Mestni stadion Ajdovščina
- Location: Ajdovščina, Slovenia
- Coordinates: 45.8881692°N 13.8944436°E
- Owner: City of Ajdovščina
- Operator: Zavod za šport Ajdovščina
- Capacity: 1,630
- Surface: Grass

Construction
- Built: 1929
- Renovated: 1995, 1998, 2010

Tenant
- ND Primorje

Ajdovščina City Stadium (Slovene: Mestni stadion Ajdovščina) is a stadium in Ajdovščina, Slovenia. It is used mostly for football matches and is the home ground of ND Primorje.

Built in 1929, the stadium was renovated in 1995 and 1998 to meet the criteria for UEFA competitions. During the 2009–10 season, the stadium underwent extensive reconstruction. It was reopened on 5 September 2010 with a capacity of 1,630 seats.

== See also ==
- List of football stadiums in Slovenia
