= Malečnik =

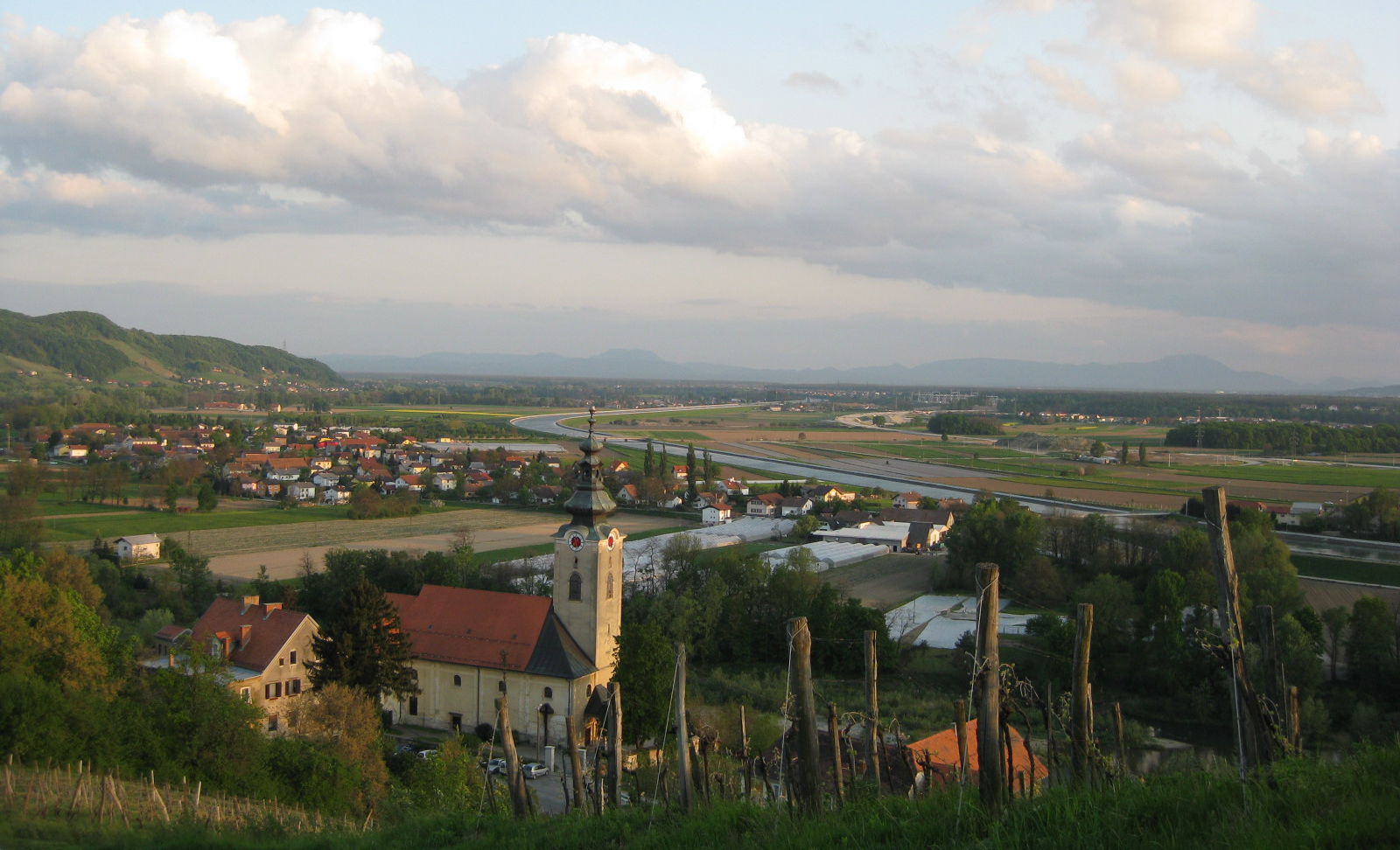

- Location in Slovenia
- Coordinates: 46°33′22.41″N 15°41′54.3″E
- Country: Slovenia
- Traditional region: Styria
- Statistical region: Drava
- Municipality: Maribor

Area
  - Total: 1.61 km^{2} (0.62 sq mi)
- Elevation: 284.2 m (932 ft)

Population (2021)
  - Total: 524

Malečnik (pronounced [maˈleːtʃnik], German: Maletschnig) is a village on the left bank of the Drava River east of Maribor in northeastern Slovenia. It belongs to the City Municipality of Maribor.

There are two churches in the settlement. The local parish church is dedicated to Saint Peter and was first mentioned in documents dating to 1236, but the current building is Baroque and was built in 1740. It belongs to the Roman Catholic Archdiocese of Maribor. The second church is built on a hill above the settlement. It is dedicated to the Virgin Mary and dates to 1517 with a Gothic belfry and a Baroque extension.
