= Izola City Stadium =

Multi-use stadium in Izola, Slovenia

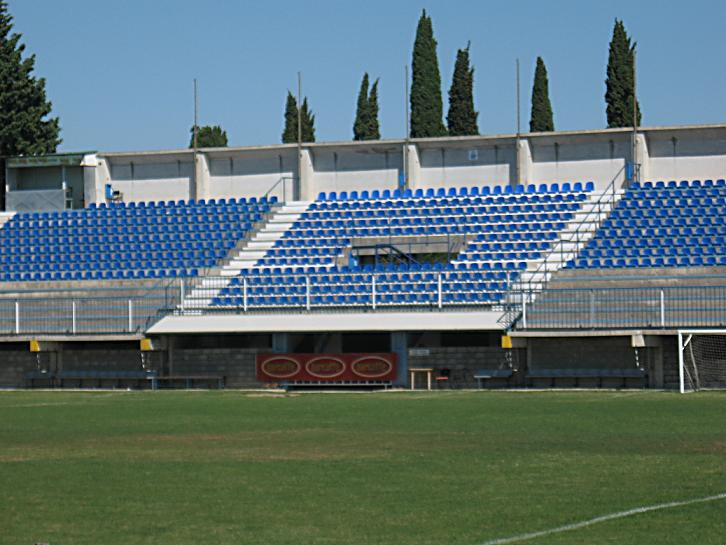
- Interactive map of Izola City Stadium
- Full name: Mestni stadion Izola
- Location: Izola, Slovenia
- Coordinates: 45°32′13″N 13°39′55″E
- Owner: Municipality of Izola
- Capacity: 5,085
- Surface: Artificial turf

Construction
- Built: 1964
- Renovated: 1992, 2013–2014

Tenants
- NK Izola (1964–1996); MNK Izola (1996–present); SC Bonifika (2007–2008)

Izola City Stadium (Slovene: Mestni stadion Izola) is a multi-use stadium in Izola, Slovenia. It is currently used mostly for football matches and is the home ground of MNK Izola. The stadium has a capacity of 5,085 seats.

== Concerts ==
- Iggy Pop (1994)
- Deep Purple (1996)
- Nek (1998)
- Iron Maiden (2000)
- Deep Purple (2004)
- Status Quo (2004)
- Cheap Trick (2004)

== Gallery ==
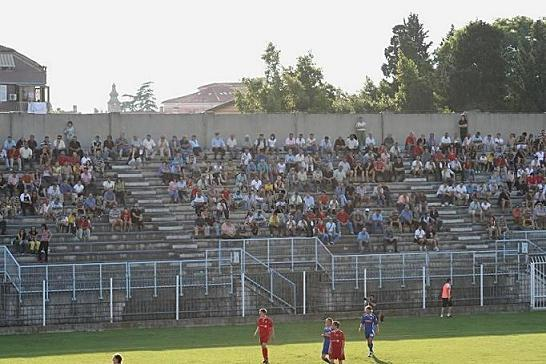
West Stand in 2008

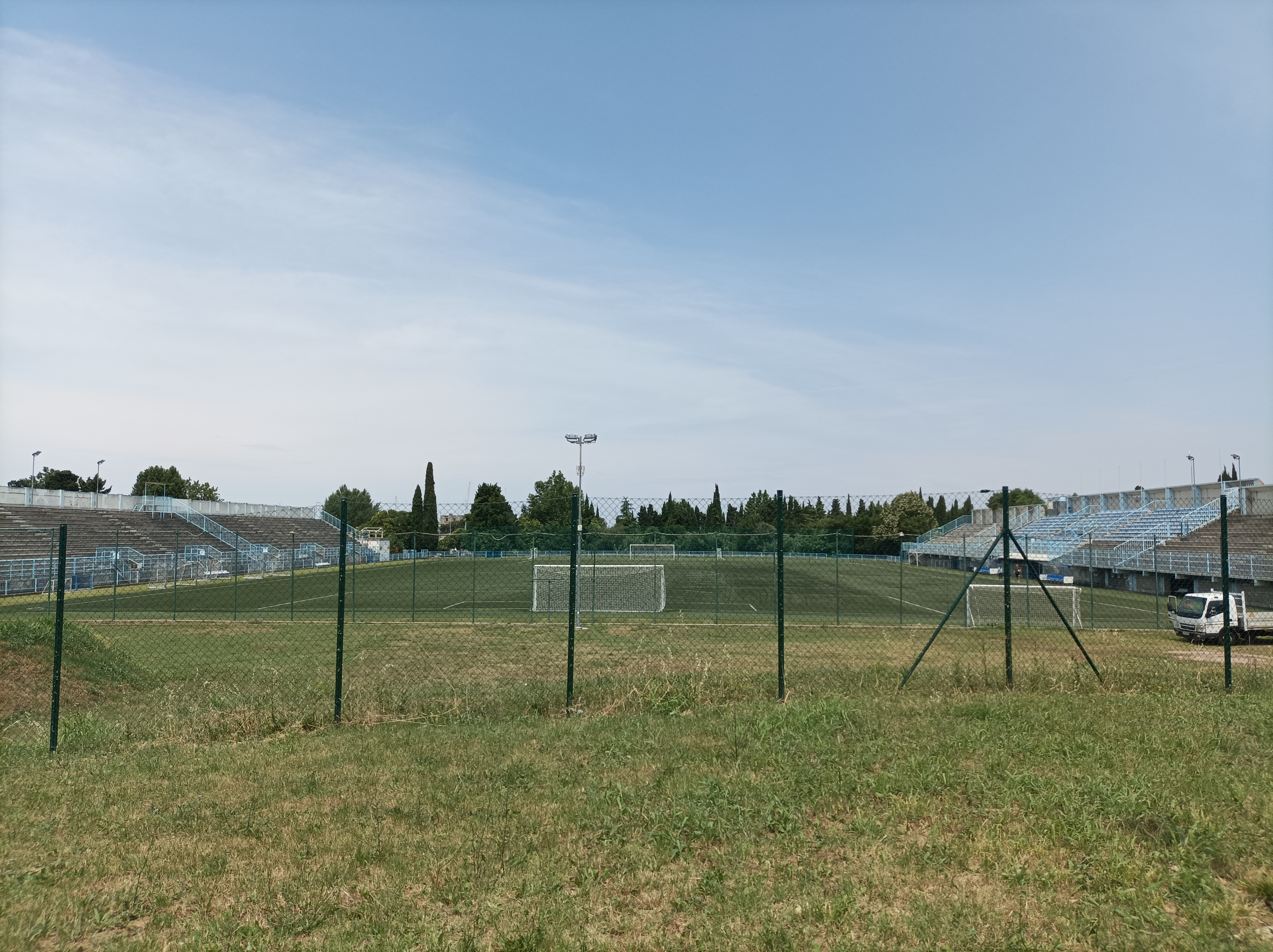
Behind the goal view in 2022

== See also ==
- List of football stadiums in Slovenia
