= NK Črenšovci =

Slovenian football club

Črenšovci
- Full name: Nogometni klub Črenšovci
- Founded: 1976; 50 years ago
- Ground: Črenšovci Sports Park
- President: Dominik Pintarič
- League: Pomurska League
- 2025–26: Pomurska League, 4th of 12
- Website: www.nk-crensovci.si
Home colours	Away colours

Nogometni klub Črenšovci (English: Črenšovci Football Club), commonly referred to as NK Črenšovci or simply Črenšovci, is a Slovenian football club based in Črenšovci. As of the 2025–26 season, they play in the Pomurska League, the fourth highest league in Slovenia. The club was founded in 1976.

== Honours ==
- Slovenian Third League

Winners: 1998–99

- Slovenian Fourth Division

Winners: 2013–14, 2016–17

- MNZ Lendava Cup

Winners: 2007–08, 2008–09
