= NK Ivančna Gorica =

Slovenian football club

Ivančna Gorica
- Full name: Nogometni klub Ivančna Gorica
- Nickname: Risi (The Lynx)
- Founded: 1973; 53 years ago
- Ground: Ivančna Gorica Stadium
- Capacity: 1,500
- President: Janez Perme
- Head coach: Andrej Janežič
- League: Ljubljana Regional League
- 2025–26: Ljubljana Regional League, 9th of 13
- Website: nkivancnagorica.eu
Home colours	Away colours

Nogometni klub Ivančna Gorica (English: Ivančna Gorica Football Club), commonly referred to as NK Ivančna Gorica or simply Ivančna Gorica, is a Slovenian football club based in Ivančna Gorica. Founded in 1973, the club played as NK Livar from 1984, named after its sponsor, before returning to its original name. The first team competes in the Ljubljana Regional League, the fourth tier of Slovenian football. The club's greatest achievement is its appearance in the Slovenian PrvaLiga, the top tier of Slovenian football, in the 2007–08 season. Home matches are played at Ivančna Gorica Stadium, which has 1,500 covered seats.

== History ==
=== Beginnings (1972–1973) ===
Football in the area was first played by young men from the village of Črnelo, who founded the club Zvezda Črnelo and competed in a village league. The sports society ŠD Zvezda Črnelo was founded at an assembly on 15 April 1972. The local community obtained land for a football pitch from the Stična agricultural cooperative; the main pitch of today's stadium stands on that land.

The founding assembly of NK Ivančna Gorica was held on 11 June 1973 in the local cultural hall, attended by 25 founding members. Ludvik Čampa was elected the first club president and Avguštin Gorec the chairman of the executive board. The club played its first match on 18 June 1973 in Mirna, and its first official home match on 24 June 1973 against Olimpija Ljubljana.

=== Early years (1973–1983) ===
Training was led by Janez Vodenšek, a former player of Rudar Trbovlje. In its first year, the club entered a senior team and two youth teams; the youth team finished second in its league, while the senior team finished fifth. In 1976, the club competed in the Lower Carniola Regional League. A women's team was formed in 1977 and coached by Srečko Klopčar; the team twice defeated the top division side Domžale.

=== NK Livar (1984–1997) ===
At an executive board meeting on 13 July 1984, the name Livar appeared for the first time, after the local foundry company IMP Livar became the club's sponsor. The club produced several players who took part in regional representative teams; Janez Škrjanc played for the Slovenia youth national team. Ivan Potokar led the club during its 20th anniversary in 1993.

=== Rise to the top division (1997–2008) ===
In 1997, at the invitation of president Ivan Potokar, entrepreneur Janez Hrovat joined the club and helped it out of financial difficulties. As the club's main financial backer and a board member, he funded the construction of the stands. Under coach Nedeljko Gugolj, the club won promotion nearly every season from the fifth tier. In 1999, a new pitch was laid and the stadium was officially opened. Livar first played in the Slovenian Second League in 1999–2000. In 2006, the club reached the quarter-finals of the Slovenian Football Cup, losing 5–1 to Celje.

In 2006–07, Livar won the Second League by beating leaders Bonifika 1–0 in the final round, courtesy of a goal from Simon Prudič. The team was assembled by coach Sandi Bracović and led to the end of the season by Branko Vrščaj. In 2007–08, with Stane Osterman as president, the club played in the Slovenian PrvaLiga. Its first top-flight win came on 28 November 2007 in the 8th round, 3–1 away at Drava Ptuj; the team was captained by Janez Perme. For top-flight football, a roof was built over the stand and seats were added, bringing the stadium to 1,500 seats. The club was relegated after one season.

=== After the top division (2008–2023) ===
After relegation, Livar played in the Second League and was relegated to the Slovenian Third League after the 2009–10 season. A new board led by president Janez Hrovat and sporting director Rafael Koren began the club's financial recovery and reorganisation. The Ivančna Gorica football school was founded in 2010; the idea came from Tomaž Vesel and its first president was Uroš Kušar. By 2013, the club had 250 registered players.

The senior team played in the Third League until 2019, when it was relegated to the fourth tier. The under-17 and under-19 teams, in cooperation with NK Brinje Grosuplje, reached the national second division on several occasions. In the round of 16 of the 2015–16 Slovenian Cup, the club lost 3–1 to Olimpija Ljubljana in front of 750 spectators. In April 2017, the stadium received floodlights with 32 lamps on four 20-metre masts.

The club marked its 50th anniversary on 8 September 2023 with a friendly against Olimpija.

== Stadium ==
The club plays its home matches at Ivančna Gorica Stadium, which features a natural grass main pitch and a 1,500-seat covered grandstand. The stadium complex includes an artificial turf pitch located to the west, while the Ljubljana–Novo Mesto railway line runs adjacent to the southern boundary.

== List of presidents ==
List of club presidents since 1973.

Period	President
1973–1976	Ludvik Čampa
1976–1989	Janez Vodenšek
1989–1995	Ivan Potokar
1995–1996	Zoran Ilišković
1996–1998	Ivan Potokar
1998–1999	Jaka Sever
1999–2000	Boris Peterka
2000–2005	Jaka Sever
2005–2008	Stanislav Osterman (Note: From December 2005; Cvetka Furlan was acting president before that.)
2008–2011	Janez Hrovat
2011–2013	Gregor Jakoš (Note: From September 2011; Lojze Lihtenvalner was acting president until elections in January 2013.)
2013–2026	Rafael Koren
2026–present	Janez Perme

== Youth teams ==
Besides the senior team, the club fields youth teams from under-7 to under-19 and a veterans' team. The younger teams compete in the local leagues of the Ljubljana Intercommunal Football Association, while the under-19 team plays in the Second Slovenian Youth League (West division).

== Honours ==
- Slovenian Second League
  - Winners: 2006–07
- Slovenian Third League
  - Winners: 1998–99
- Slovenian Fourth Division
  - Winners: 1997–98
- MNZ Ljubljana Cup
  - Winners: 1997–98, 1998–99, 2004–05, 2014–15
