= 2023–24 Slovenian Football Cup =

Tournament details
- Country: Slovenia

Final positions
- Champions: Rogaška (1st title)
- Runners-up: Gorica

The 2023–24 Slovenian Football Cup was the 33rd edition of the football knockout tournament in Slovenia.

Rogaška defeated Gorica in the final 6–5 on penalties (1–1 after extra time) to win their first title. As winners, they should have qualified for the 2024–25 UEFA Europa League first qualifying round, but did not get a competition licence, so the berth was given to the 2023–24 Slovenian PrvaLiga second-placed team, Maribor.

== Preliminary round ==
| Team 1 | Score | Team 2 |
19 August 2023
| Bakovci | 1–1 (0–3 p) | Serdica Goričanka |
| Ižakovci | 2–1 | Cankova |
| Križevci | 0–4 | Čarda Martjanci |
| Lipa | 1–8 | Gančani |
| Radgona | 1–2 | Grad |
| Roma | 0–2 | Radenska Slatina |
20 August 2023
| Čentiba | 1–5 | Prekmurec Dobrovnik |
| Mostje | 3–0 | Hotiza |
| Nafta veterani | 0–8 | Odranci |
| Panonija Gaberje | 2–1 | Graničar Lendava |
22 August 2023
| Lenart | 2–3 | Marjeta na Dravskem polju |
23 August 2023
| Bitnje | 1–2 | Visoko |
| Britof | 3–0 | Polet |
| Limbuš-Pekre | 5–1 | Dravograd |
| Sava Kranj | 1–2 | Preddvor |
| Velesovo-Cerklje | 2–6 | Zarica Kranj |
| Železniki | 0–3 | Bled |
25 August 2023
| Dob | 7–2 | Jevnica |
| Skorba | 0–4 | Markovci |
26 August 2023
| Bela Krajina | 3–0 | Mengo 28 |
| Cirkulane | 3–1 | Hajdoše |
| Dragomer | 0–3 | Zagorje |
| IB 1975 Ljubljana | 5–0 | Svoboda Ljubljana |
| Idrija | 1–1 (2–4 p) | Vipava |
| Ihan | 0–3 | Ljubljana |
| Jurovski Dol | 2–2 (5–4 p) | Pohorje |
| Kamnik | 0–0 (4–2 p) | Dren Vrhnika |
| Komen | 3–3 (4–3 p) | Bistrc |
| Košana | 1–2 | Korte |
| Laško | 0–3 | Krško |
| Leskovec | 0–7 | Rogoznica |
| Malečnik | 1–2 | Rače |
| MB Tabor | 0–6 | Fužinar |
| Mons Claudius | 0–6 | Rudar Velenje |
| OŠ Olimpija Ljubljana | 2–2 (1–4 p) | Komenda |
| Oplotnica | 1–1 (3–5 p) | Pragersko |
| Podlehnik | 0–2 | Gerečja vas |
| Polskava | 3–0 | Tržec |
| Radlje ob Dravi | 0–5 | Dobrovce |
| Renče | 0–4 | Brda |
| Rošnja Loka | 1–5 | Pesnica |
| Rudar Trbovlje | 5–1 | Kočevje |
| Slovan | 3–0 | Litija |
| Starše | 1–0 | Korotan Prevalje |
| Svoboda Kisovec | 0–5 | Brinje Grosuplje |
| Termit Moravče | 1–3 | Šmartno |
| Zgornja Polskava | 1–1 (4–3 p) | Gorišnica |
27 August 2023
| Bukovci | 2–2 (1–3 p) | Grajena |
| Ivančna Gorica | 4–2 | Jezero Medvode |
| Makole | 3–5 | Središče |
| Šentjernej | 0–4 | Ilirija 1911 |
| Slovenja vas | 0–5 | Dornava |
| Šmartno 1928 | 2–1 | Dravinja |
| Šobec Lesce | 1–2 | Triglav Kranj |
| Stojnci | 5–3 | Boč Poljčane |
20 September 2023
| Mozirje | 0–1 | Šampion |

== First round ==
| Team 1 | Score | Team 2 |
13 September 2023
| Britof | 1–1 (3–4 p) | Šenčur |
| Kranjska Gora | 0–9 | Bled |
| Naklo | 1–5 | Žiri |
| Preddvor | 3–2 | Škofja Loka |
| Visoko | 1–3 | Jesenice |
20 September 2023
| Apače (Murska Sobota) | 0–8 | Rakičan |
| Bogojina | 2–3 | Radenska Slatina |
| Cven | 0–1 | Hodoš |
| Dokležovje | 0–2 | Mura |
| Grad | 2–0 | Serdica Goričanka |
| Puconci | 0–6 | Čarda Martjanci |
| Šalovci | 1–3 | Veržej |
| Tišina | 0–3 | Gančani |
26 September 2023
| Markovci | 1–4 | Videm |
27 September 2023
| Gerečja vas | 1–7 | Drava Ptuj |
| Ižakovci | 1–5 | Ljutomer |
| Zarica Kranj | 0–3 | Triglav Kranj |
| Olimpija Dolga vas | 0–0 (2–4 p) | Turnišče |
3 October 2023
| Cirkulane | 0–5 | Apače (Ptuj) |
| Limbuš-Pekre | 3–5 | Marjeta na Dravskem polju |
| Polskava | 0–7 | Hajdina |
| Šampion | 0–1 | Krško |
| Šmarje pri Jelšah | 1–1 (4–3 p) | Ljubno ob Savinji |
| Šmartno | 0–5 | Dob |
| Žalec | 0–2 | Zreče |
| Zgornja Polskava | 3–1 | Dornava |
4 October 2023
| Adria | 0–4 | Primorje |
| Arne Tabor 69 | 0–3 | Brinje Grosuplje |
| Bravo | 0–0 (2–4 p) | Radomlje |
| Brda | 0–4 | Gorica |
| Jadran Dekani | 1–4 | Tabor Sežana |
| Galeb Ankaran | 0–1 | Komen |
| Grajena | 2–2 (5–6 p) | Stojnci |
| Ilirija 1911 | 3–2 | Krka |
| Ivančna Gorica | 1–1 (4–2 p) | Slovan |
| Jadran Hrpelje-Kozina | 1–14 | Izola |
| Jurovski Dol | 0–0 (9–8 p) | Rače |
| Kamnik | 2–4 | Bela Krajina |
| Kobilje | 0–6 | Nafta 1903 |
| Korte | 0–1 | Koper |
| Ljubljana | 5–3 | Zagorje |
| Mostje | 0–3 | Odranci |
| Ormož | 0–5 | Bistrica |
| Peca | 0–1 | Starše |
| Pesnica | 0–1 | Fužinar |
| Polana | 7–1 | Črenšovci |
| Pragersko | 2–6 | Podvinci |
| Roho | 4–1 | Dobrovce |
| Rogoznica | 3–5 | Središče |
| Rudar Trbovlje | 7–0 | Komenda |
| Šmartno 1928 | 0–6 | Rudar Velenje |
| Tolmin | 1–0 | Bilje |
| Trebnje | 2–2 (5–4 p) | Kresnice |
| Tromejnik | 0–3 | Beltinci |
| Vir | 0–1 | IB 1975 Ljubljana |
| Zavrč | 0–0 (4–3 p) | Aluminij |
| Vodice Šempas | 1–4 | Vipava |
5 October 2023
| Brežice 1919 | 1–3 | Rogaška |
| Nedelica | 0–9 | Prekmurec Dobrovnik |
| Panonija Gaberje | 0–6 | Srednja Bistrica |

== Second round ==
| Team 1 | Score | Team 2 |
4 October 2023
| Bled | 1–4 | Jesenice |
| Preddvor | 0–4 | Šenčur |
| Žiri | 2–2 (6–7 p) | Triglav Kranj |
18 October 2023
| Čarda Martjanci | 1–0 | Grad |
| Gančani | 5–2 | Veržej |
| Hodoš | 0–4 | Mura |
| Radenska Slatina | 0–5 | Beltinci |
| Rakičan | 0–8 | Ljutomer |
24 October 2023
| Zgornja Polskava | 0–4 | Videm |
31 October 2023
| Apače (Ptuj) | 0–4 | Zavrč |
| Srednja Bistrica | 1–3 | Odranci |
| Dob | 0–1 | Domžale |
| Drava Ptuj | 1–1 (4–5 p) | Hajdina |
| Ivančna Gorica | 1–4 | Rudar Trbovlje |
| Izola | 0–1 | Tabor Sežana |
| Komen | 0–6 | Koper |
| Maribor | 9–0 | Jurovski Dol |
| Marjeta na Dravskem polju | 2–3 | Roho |
| Središče | 1–0 | Bistrica |
| Šmarje pri Jelšah | 1–4 | Rogaška |
| Starše | 2–4 | Fužinar |
| Trebnje | 1–1 (2–4 p) | IB 1975 Ljubljana |
| Turnišče | 1–2 | Prekmurec Dobrovnik |
2 November 2023
| Bela Krajina | 1–3 | Ilirija 1911 |
| Brinje Grosuplje | 0–0 (2–4 p) | Olimpija Ljubljana |
| Krško | 1–4 | Celje |
| Ljubljana | 0–4 | Radomlje |
| Polana | 1–4 | Nafta 1903 |
| Primorje | 2–0 | Tolmin |
| Vipava | 1–1 (1–3 p) | Gorica |
| Zreče | 0–2 | Rudar Velenje |
3 November 2023
| Stojnci | 0–3 (w/o) | Podvinci |

== Round of 32 ==
| Team 1 | Score | Team 2 |
21 November 2023
| Zavrč | 1–2 | Triglav Kranj |
22 November 2023
| IB 1975 Ljubljana | 1–3 (a.e.t.) | Rogaška |
| Olimpija Ljubljana | 4–1 | Rudar Velenje |
| Odranci | 0–3 | Koper |
| Fužinar | 0–2 | Radomlje |
| Gorica | 2–1 | Domžale |
| Nafta 1903 | 1–1 (a.e.t.) (5–4 p) | Celje |
23 November 2023
| Primorje | 1–3 | Maribor |
| Šenčur | 0–2 | Mura |
25 November 2023
| Gančani | 0–7 | Beltinci |
| Podvinci | 3–2 | Tabor Sežana |
| Roho | 0–5 | Ilirija 1911 |
| Rudar Trbovlje | 1–4 | Jesenice |
26 November 2023
| Videm | 3–2 (a.e.t.) | Hajdina |
| Čarda Martjanci | 7–2 | Prekmurec Dobrovnik |
| Središče | 0–4 | Ljutomer |

== Round of 16 ==
| Team 1 | Score | Team 2 |
5 March 2024
| Podvinci | 0–1 | Triglav Kranj |
| Videm | 1–3 | Ilirija 1911 |
6 March 2024
| Beltinci | 5–0 | Ljutomer |
| Jesenice | 1–3 | Gorica |
| Maribor | 1–2 | Radomlje |
7 March 2024
| Čarda Martjanci | 0–3 | Mura |
| Olimpija Ljubljana | 2–4 | Koper |
| Nafta 1903 | 1–2 (a.e.t.) | Rogaška |

== Quarter-finals ==
| 2 April 2024 | Triglav Kranj | 2–3 | Rogaška | Kranj |
| 18:00 UTC+2 | Momčilovski 24'; Horvat 50' | Report | Mijić 10'; Korošec 49'; Thalisson 72' | Stadium: Stanko Mlakar Stadium; Attendance: 500; Referee: Alen Bubek |

| 3 April 2024 | Gorica | 4–1 | Radomlje | Nova Gorica |
| 17:00 UTC+2 | Kadrić 34', 60'; Baruca 55'; Marjanac 78' | Report | Kukovec 9' | Stadium: Nova Gorica Sports Park; Attendance: 600; Referee: Aleksandar Matković |

| 3 April 2024 | Koper | 1–1 (a.e.t.) (4–5 p) | Mura | Koper |
| 20:00 UTC+2 | Omladič 76' | Report | Maroša 84' | Stadium: Bonifika Stadium; Attendance: 500; Referee: Martin Matoša |
| | Penalties |
| | Jelenič (penalty scored); Sule (penalty scored); Prce (penalty scored); Pabai (penalty missed); Palčič (penalty scored); Lauš (penalty missed) | | (penalty scored) Nuhanović; (penalty missed) Kurtovič; (penalty scored) Jovićević; (penalty scored) Kyziridis; (penalty scored) Šarić; (penalty scored) Trontelj |

| 4 April 2024 | Ilirija 1911 | 1–2 (a.e.t.) | Beltinci | Ljubljana |
| 15:00 UTC+2 | Lukežič 102' | Report | Kaučič 101'; Kralj 115' | Stadium: Ilirija Sports Park; Attendance: 150; Referee: Denis Halilović |

== Semi-finals ==
The draw for the semi-finals was held on 8 April 2024. The matches were played on 24 and 25 April.

| 24 April 2024 | Gorica | 1–1 (a.e.t.) (5–3 p) | Beltinci | Nova Gorica |
| 20:00 UTC+2 | Kadrić 59' | Report | Černe 43' | Stadium: Nova Gorica Sports Park; Attendance: 1,000; Referee: Martin Matoša |
| | Penalties |
| | Baruca (penalty scored); Lesjak (penalty scored); Almeida (penalty scored); Krstić (penalty scored); Marjanac (penalty scored) | | (penalty scored) Nerguti; (penalty scored) Težački; (penalty missed) Kralj; (penalty scored) Pihler |

| 25 April 2024 | Mura | 2–2 (a.e.t.) (4–5 p) | Rogaška | Murska Sobota |
| 20:00 UTC+2 | Maroša 20'; Čakš 66' | Report | Mijić 44', 53' | Stadium: Fazanerija City Stadium; Attendance: 2,750; Referee: Slavko Vinčić |
| | Penalties |
| | Nuhanović (penalty scored); Maruško (penalty scored); Jovićević (penalty missed); Trontelj (penalty scored); Sadriu (penalty scored); Čakš (penalty missed) | | (penalty missed) Thalisson; (penalty scored) Majcenić; (penalty scored) Kambič; (penalty scored) Mijić; (penalty scored) Kitek; (penalty scored) Prenkpalaj |

== Final ==
The final was held on 24 May 2024 at Stožice Stadium in Ljubljana.

24 May 2024
20:30 UTC+2

| Rogaška | 1–1 (a.e.t.) | Gorica |
|---|---|---|
| Thalisson 105+1' | Report | Marjanac 110' |
Penalties
| Lampreht (penalty scored); Majcenić (penalty missed); Pirtovšek (penalty scored); Mijić (penalty scored); Kambič (penalty scored); Prenkpalaj (penalty scored); Kitek (penalty scored) | 6–5 | (penalty scored) Lesjak; (penalty missed) Jalinous; (penalty scored) Hodžić; (penalty scored) Krstić; (penalty scored) Marjanac; (penalty scored) Inwen; (penalty missed) Ćosić |

Stožice Stadium, Ljubljana
Attendance: 4,042
Referee: Dejan Balažič

== See also ==
- 2023–24 Slovenian PrvaLiga
