= 2016–17 Slovenian Third League =

Slovenian Third League
- Season: 2016–17
- Champions: Bravo (Centre); Nafta 1903 (East); Maribor B (North); Tabor Sežana (West)
- Promoted: Bravo; Ilirija 1911; Nafta 1903; Mura; Rogaška; Fužinar; Tabor Sežana; Jadran Dekani
- Relegated: Velesovo; Jevnica; Križevci; Brunšvik; Šmartno 1928; Postojna
- Matches: 681
- Goals: 2,406 (3.53 per match)
- Top goalscorer: Anel Hajrić (33 goals)
- Total attendance: 122,918
- Average attendance: 180

The 2016–17 Slovenian Third League began on 20 August 2016 and ended on 28 May 2017.

== Competition format and rules ==
The 2016–17 Slovenian Third League was divided into four regional groups with a total of 52 participating clubs. Three groups (i.e. North, Centre, East) were composed of 14 clubs, while the West group had only 10 clubs participating in the competition.

On 29 June 2016, the Football Association of Slovenia decided to expand the Slovenian Second League in the 2017–18 season from 10 teams to 16 teams, meaning that in the 2016–17 Slovenian Third League season the top two teams from each group got promoted to the Second League. Also, unlike previous seasons, reserve teams were now able to earn a promotion to the Second League.

The number of relegated teams from each group was determined by the number of regional MNZ's from which the clubs in all four groups were part of. There were nine MNZ's governing bodies in Slovenian football:

- MNZ Celje (North)
- MNZ Maribor (North)
- MNZ Ptuj (North)
- MNZG-Kranj (Centre)
- MNZ Ljubljana (Centre)
- MNZ Lendava (East)
- MNZ Murska Sobota (East)
- MNZ Koper (West)
- MNZ Nova Gorica (West)

This meant that three teams from 3. SNL North were relegated at the end of the season and replaced by the winners of the fourth tier competitions held separately in MNZ Celje, MNZ Maribor and MNZ Ptuj. The number of relegated teams from 3. SNL Centre and 3. SNL East was two, while only the bottom team was relegated from 3. SNL West as MNZ Koper and MNZ Nova Gorica managed a combined fourth tier competition.
The number of relegated teams was also influenced by the location of teams which relegated from the second division. Each of the bottom placed second division teams could only relegate to the one 3. SNL group that was managed by the MNZ they were a part of.

== 3. SNL Centre ==
=== Clubs ===
Location of teams in the 2016–17 Slovenian Third League Centre

Club	Location	Stadium	2015–16 position
Bled	Bled	Bled Sports Centre	9th
Bravo	Ljubljana	ŽŠD Stadium	2nd
Brinje Grosuplje	Grosuplje	Brinje Stadium	8th
Ilirija	Ljubljana	Ilirija Sports Park	1st
Ivančna Gorica	Ivančna Gorica	Ivančna Gorica Stadium	3rd
Jevnica	Jevnica	ŠRC Jevnica	1st in MNZ Ljubljana
Kolpa	Podzemelj	Podzemelj Sports Park	7th
Komenda	Komenda	Komenda Hipodrom	4th
Lesce	Lesce	Na Žagi Stadium	11th
Rudar	Trbovlje	Rudar Stadium	10th
Sava	Kranj	Stražišče Sports Park	5th
Šenčur	Šenčur	Šenčur Sports Park	10th in 2. SNL
Velesovo	Velesovo	Sports Park Velesovo	1st in MNZG-Kranj
Zagorje	Zagorje ob Savi	Zagorje City Stadium	6th

=== League table ===
Pos	Team	Pld	W	D	L	GF	GA	GD	Pts	Qualification or relegation
1	Bravo (C, P)	26	21	3	2	105	19	+86	66	Promoted to Slovenian Second League
2	Ilirija (P)	26	18	7	1	71	23	+48	61	Promoted to Slovenian Second League
3	Bled	26	17	5	4	58	27	+31	56	
4	Ivančna Gorica	26	15	3	8	66	47	+19	48	
5	Zagorje	26	12	7	7	39	23	+16	43	
6	Šenčur	26	12	2	12	39	39	0	38	
7	Komenda	26	8	10	8	39	38	+1	34	
8	Sava Kranj	26	8	6	12	33	48	−15	30	
9	Brinje Grosuplje	26	7	8	11	35	46	−11	29	
10	Kolpa	26	7	4	15	40	53	−13	25	
11	Rudar Trbovlje	26	6	6	14	40	59	−19	24	
12	Lesce	26	6	4	16	32	85	−53	22	
13	Velesovo (R)	26	4	6	16	26	51	−25	18	Relegated to MNZG-Kranj
14	Jevnica (R)	26	3	5	18	21	86	−65	14	Relegated to MNZ Ljubljana

Source: MNZ Ljubljana (in Slovene) NZS.si (in Slovene)
Rules for classification: 1) points; 2) points in head-to-head matches; 3) goal difference in head-to-head matches; 4) away goals scored in head-to-head matches; 5) total goal difference; 6) total goals scored; 7) away goals scored in all matches; 8) fair-play; 9) draw
(C) Champions; (P) Promoted; (R) Relegated

== 3. SNL East ==
=== Clubs ===
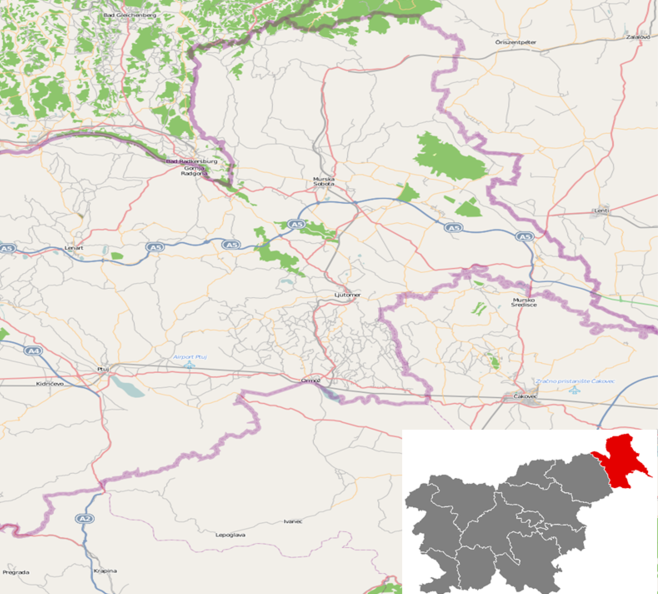
Location of teams in the 2016–17 Slovenian Third League East

Club	Location	Stadium	2015–16 position
Beltinci	Beltinci	Beltinci Sports Park	1st
Bogojina	Bogojina	ŠRC Bogojina	1st in MNZ Murska Sobota
Čarda	Martjanci	ŠRC Martjanci	11th
Grad	Grad	Igrišče Pod gradom	9th
Hotiza	Hotiza	Hotiza Sports Park	1st in MNZ Lendava
Križevci	Križevci	Križevci Sports Park	10th
Ljutomer	Ljutomer	Ljutomer Sports Park	6th
Mura	Murska Sobota	Fazanerija	2nd
Nafta 1903	Lendava	Lendava Sports Park	7th
Odranci	Odranci	ŠRC Odranci	3rd
Polana	Velika Polana	PC Poljana	5th
Rakičan	Rakičan	Grajski Park Stadium	12th
Tromejnik	Kuzma	Kuzma Football Stadium	4th
Turnišče	Turnišče	Turnišče Stadium	8th

=== League table ===
Pos	Team	Pld	W	D	L	GF	GA	GD	Pts	Qualification or relegation
1	Nafta 1903 (C, P)	26	21	2	3	82	17	+65	65	Promoted to Slovenian Second League
2	Mura (P)	26	20	3	3	100	17	+83	63	Promoted to Slovenian Second League
3	Odranci	26	19	3	4	56	31	+25	60	
4	Beltinci	26	15	4	7	53	24	+29	49	
5	Ljutomer	26	13	2	11	48	39	+9	41	
6	Tromejnik	26	11	4	11	37	40	−3	37	
7	Hotiza	26	10	3	13	41	61	−20	33	
8	Čarda	26	8	7	11	39	57	−18	31	
9	Polana	26	9	3	14	38	53	−15	30	
10	Rakičan	26	8	4	14	31	61	−30	28	
11	Grad	26	7	4	15	26	55	−29	25	
12	Bogojina	26	7	4	15	22	65	−43	25	
13	Turnišče	26	6	4	16	28	50	−22	22	Spared from relegation (Note: NK Turnišče was spared from relegation due to insufficient number of teams.)
14	Križevci (R)	26	3	3	20	23	54	−31	12	Relegated to MNZ Murska Sobota

Source: MNZ Lendava (in Slovene) NZS.si (in Slovene)
Rules for classification: 1) points; 2) points in head-to-head matches; 3) goal difference in head-to-head matches; 4) away goals scored in head-to-head matches; 5) total goal difference; 6) total goals scored; 7) away goals scored in all matches; 8) fair-play; 9) draw
(C) Champions; (P) Promoted; (R) Relegated

== 3. SNL North ==
=== Clubs ===
Location of teams in the 2016–17 Slovenian Third League North

Club	Location	Stadium	2015–16 position
Brunšvik	Brunšvik	Brunšvik Sports park	2nd in MNZ Maribor
Dobrovce	Dobrovce	Dobrovce Sports Park	10th
Dravinja	Slovenske Konjice	Dobrava Stadium	11th
Dravograd	Dravograd	Dravograd Sports Centre	8th
Fužinar	Ravne na Koroškem	City Stadium	6th
Korotan Prevalje	Prevalje	Prevalje Stadium	1st in MNZ Maribor
Lenart	Lenart	ŠRC Polena	9th
Maribor B	Maribor	Tabor Sports Park	2nd
Mons Claudius	Rogatec	Rogatec Sports Centre	7th
Rogaška	Rogaška Slatina	Rogaška Slatina Sports Centre	1st in MNZ Celje
Šampion	Celje	Olimp	3rd
Šmarje	Šmarje pri Jelšah	Sports Park	5th
Šmartno 1928	Šmartno ob Paki	Šmartno Stadium	12th
Videm	Videm pri Ptuju	Videm Sports Park	4th

=== League table ===
Pos	Team	Pld	W	D	L	GF	GA	GD	Pts	Qualification or relegation
1	Maribor B (C)	26	21	3	2	107	25	+82	66	Declined promotion. Team disbanded.
2	Rogaška (P)	26	16	6	4	76	29	+47	54	Promoted to Slovenian Second League
3	Fužinar (P)	26	12	6	8	48	34	+14	42	Promoted to Slovenian Second League
4	Dravograd	26	12	5	9	40	38	+2	41	
5	Korotan Prevalje	26	12	4	10	57	44	+13	40	
6	Mons Claudius	26	11	6	9	51	44	+7	39	
7	Šmarje pri Jelšah	26	11	5	10	37	39	−2	38	
8	Dravinja	26	11	3	12	35	39	−4	36	
9	Šampion	26	10	3	13	47	57	−10	33	
10	Dobrovce	26	8	5	13	41	63	−22	29	
11	Videm	26	8	5	13	36	54	−18	29	
12	Lenart	26	7	6	13	36	58	−22	27	
13	Brunšvik (R)	26	7	5	14	46	66	−20	26	Relegated to MNZ Maribor
14	Šmartno 1928 (R)	26	4	2	20	19	86	−67	14	Relegated to MNZ Celje

Source: MNZ Celje (in Slovene) NZS.si (in Slovene)
Rules for classification: 1) points; 2) points in head-to-head matches; 3) goal difference in head-to-head matches; 4) away goals scored in head-to-head matches; 5) total goal difference; 6) total goals scored; 7) away goals scored in all matches; 8) fair-play; 9) draw
(C) Champions; (P) Promoted; (R) Relegated

== 3. SNL West ==
=== Clubs ===
Location of teams in the 2016–17 Slovenian Third League West

Club	Location	Stadium	2015–16 position
Adria	Miren	Igrišče Pri Štantu	4th
Ajdovščina	Ajdovščina	Ajdovščina Stadium	2nd
Bilje	Bilje	Stadion V dolinci	6th
Ilirska Bistrica	Ilirska Bistrica	Trnovo Sports Centre	9th
Izola	Izola	Izola City Stadium	8th
Jadran Dekani	Dekani	Dekani Sports Park	3rd
Postojna	Postojna	Postojna Sports Park	1st in MNZ Koper
Tabor	Sežana	Rajko Štolfa Stadium	7th
Tolmin	Tolmin	Brajda Sports Park	9th in 2. SNL
Vipava	Vipava	Ob Beli Stadium	5th

=== League table ===
Pos	Team	Pld	W	D	L	GF	GA	GD	Pts	Qualification or relegation
1	Tabor Sežana (C, P)	27	21	3	3	68	16	+52	66	Promoted to Slovenian Second League
2	Jadran Dekani (P)	27	21	1	5	73	26	+47	64	Promoted to Slovenian Second League
3	Adria	27	20	2	5	70	24	+46	62	
4	Bilje	27	14	3	10	47	30	+17	45	
5	Tolmin	27	11	4	12	56	42	+14	37	
6	Vipava	27	11	4	12	46	45	+1	37	
7	Izola	27	9	6	12	42	38	+4	33	
8	Ajdovščina	27	4	5	18	21	53	−32	17	
9	Ilirska Bistrica	27	4	5	18	23	92	−69	17	
10	Postojna (R)	27	3	1	23	16	96	−80	10	Relegated to MNZ Koper

Source: MNZ Koper (in Slovene) NZS.si (in Slovene)
Rules for classification: 1) points; 2) points in head-to-head matches; 3) goal difference in head-to-head matches; 4) away goals scored in head-to-head matches; 5) total goal difference; 6) total goals scored; 7) away goals scored in all matches; 8) fair-play; 9) draw
(C) Champions; (P) Promoted; (R) Relegated

== See also ==
- 2016–17 Slovenian PrvaLiga
- 2016–17 Slovenian Second League
