= 2019–20 Slovenian Third League =

Slovenian Third League
- Season: 2019–20
- Promoted: Šmartno 1928 (East); Primorje (West)
- Relegated: Odranci; Ljutomer; Veržej; Radgona; Bled; Arne Tabor 69; Kočevje
- Top goalscorer: Jetmir Torra (13 goals)
- Biggest home win: Šampion 12–0 Radgona
- Biggest away win: Radgona 0–7 Odranci
- Highest scoring: Šampion 12–0 Radgona

The 2019–20 Slovenian Third League was the 28th edition of the Slovenian Third League. The season began on 24 August 2019 and was scheduled to end in June 2020. The competition was cancelled on 17 April 2020 due to the COVID-19 pandemic.

== Competition format and rules ==
In the 2019–20 season, the Slovenian Third League was divided into two regional groups with a total of 26 participating clubs. The West group was composed of 14 clubs, and the East group of 12 clubs. The group winners earned direct promotion to the Slovenian Second League.

== 3. SNL East ==
=== Clubs ===
A total of 12 teams competed in the league, including 10 sides from the 2018–19 season and the 2 teams promoted from the Intercommunal Leagues (Korotan Prevalje and Podvinci).

Location of teams in the 2019–20 Slovenian Third League East

Club	Location	Stadium	2018–19 position
Bistrica	Slovenska Bistrica	Slovenska Bistrica Sports Park	4th (3. SNL North)
Dravinja	Slovenske Konjice	ŠRC Dobrava	2nd (3. SNL North)
Korotan Prevalje	Prevalje	Športni park Ugasle peči	4th in MNZ Maribor
Ljutomer	Ljutomer	ŠRC Ljutomer	4th (3. SNL East)
Odranci	Odranci	ŠRC Odranci	2nd (3. SNL East)
Podvinci	Podvinci	Podvinci Stadium	1st in MNZ Ptuj
Radgona	Gornja Radgona	Gornja Radgona Stadium	10th (3. SNL East)
Šampion	Celje	Olimp	6th (3. SNL North)
Šmartno	Šmartno ob Paki	Šmartno ob Paki Stadium	3rd (3. SNL North)
Veržej	Veržej	Čistina Stadium	5th (3. SNL East)
Videm	Videm pri Ptuju	Videm Sports Park	5th (3. SNL North)
Zreče	Zreče	Zreče Stadium	7th (3. SNL North)

=== League table ===
Pos	Team	Pld	W	D	L	GF	GA	GD	Pts	Qualification or relegation
1	Šmartno 1928	11	8	2	1	37	19	+18	26	Promotion to Slovenian Second League
2	Podvinci	11	6	4	1	22	9	+13	22	
3	Dravinja	11	6	2	3	41	20	+21	20	
4	Odranci	11	6	2	3	24	14	+10	20	Withdrew from competition
5	Zreče	11	6	1	4	20	16	+4	19	
6	Šampion	11	5	2	4	32	14	+18	17	
7	Korotan Prevalje	11	5	1	5	21	15	+6	16	
8	Ljutomer	11	4	3	4	23	24	−1	15	Withdrew from competition
9	Bistrica	11	3	4	4	21	20	+1	13	
10	Videm	11	4	0	7	19	27	−8	12	
11	Veržej	11	1	2	8	11	39	−28	5	Withdrew from competition
12	Radgona	11	0	1	10	2	56	−54	1	Withdrew from competition

Rules for classification: 1) points; 2) points in head-to-head matches; 3) goal difference in head-to-head matches; 4) away goals scored in head-to-head matches; 5) total goal difference; 6) total goals scored; 7) away goals scored in all matches; 8) fair-play; 9) draw

=== Results ===
Home \ Away	BIS	DRA	KOR	LJU	ODR	POD	RAD	ŠAM	ŠMA	VER	VID	ZRE
Bistrica		1–1	1–2				5–0	0–0				1–2
Dravinja						1–1	7–0		2–3	8–0		
Korotan Prevalje		1–2		0–0			2–0	3–0		4–0		3–0
Ljutomer	1–2	2–8					7–0		2–2	3–1	5–1	
Odranci	3–0	3–2	2–1	0–1								2–4
Podvinci	2–2		3–0	0–0	0–0							2–0
Radgona					0–7	1–5			0–5	0–0	1–4	
Šampion		4–2		7–0	1–3	3–2	12–0					
Šmartno 1928	5–3		4–3		0–0	2–3		3–1			4–2	
Veržej	3–3				3–1	0–3		0–4	2–7		1–2	
Videm	1–3	3–5	3–2		2–3	0–1		1–0				0–2
Zreče		2–3		3–2			2–0	0–0	1–2	4–1		

Legend: Blue = home team win; Yellow = draw; Red = away team win.

== 3. SNL West ==
=== Clubs ===
Location of teams in the 2019–20 Slovenian Third League West

Club	Location	Stadium	2018–19 position
Adria	Miren	Igrišče Pri Štantu	5th (3. SNL West)
Arne Tabor 69	Ljubljana (Brod)	Maksov Gaj	5th (3. SNL Centre)
Bled	Bled	Bled Sports Centre	1st (3. SNL Centre)
Brinje Grosuplje	Grosuplje	Brinje Stadium	4th (3. SNL Centre)
Ilirija 1911	Ljubljana	Ilirija Sports Park	15h in 2. SNL
Izola	Izola	Izola City Stadium	6th (3. SNL West)
Kočevje	Kočevje	Gaj Stadium	1st in MNZ Ljubljana
Primorje	Ajdovščina	Ajdovščina Stadium	4th (3. SNL West)
Sava Kranj	Kranj	Stražišče Sports Park	9th (3. SNL Centre)
Svoboda Ljubljana	Ljubljana	Svoboda Sports Park	6th (3. SNL Centre)
Šenčur	Šenčur	Šenčur Sports Park	7th (3. SNL Centre)
Tolmin	Tolmin	Brajda Sports Park	2nd (3. SNL West)
Vipava	Vipava	Ob Beli Stadium	3rd (3. SNL West)
Žiri	Žiri	Polje Stadium	8th (3. SNL Centre)

=== League table ===
Pos	Team	Pld	W	D	L	GF	GA	GD	Pts	Qualification or relegation
1	Primorje	14	10	3	1	32	14	+18	33	Promotion to Slovenian Second League
2	Svoboda Ljubljana	14	9	4	1	47	19	+28	31	
3	Brinje Grosuplje	14	8	2	4	28	15	+13	26	
4	Bled	14	7	3	4	23	20	+3	24	Withdrew from competition
5	Šenčur	14	7	2	5	24	20	+4	23	
6	Tolmin	14	6	3	5	21	18	+3	21	
7	Sava Kranj	14	6	2	6	24	19	+5	20	
8	Vipava	14	5	3	6	10	15	−5	18	
9	Ilirija 1911	14	2	8	4	19	24	−5	14	
10	Žiri	14	3	5	6	21	27	−6	14	
11	Izola	14	3	5	6	16	28	−12	14	
12	Adria	14	1	7	6	19	25	−6	10	
13	Arne Tabor 69	14	1	6	7	17	28	−11	9	Relegation to Intercommunal Leagues
14	Kočevje	14	2	3	9	14	43	−29	9	Relegation to Intercommunal Leagues

Rules for classification: 1) points; 2) points in head-to-head matches; 3) goal difference in head-to-head matches; 4) away goals scored in head-to-head matches; 5) total goal difference; 6) total goals scored; 7) away goals scored in all matches; 8) fair-play; 9) draw
