= 2017–18 Slovenian Third League =

Slovenian Third League
- Season: 2017–18
- Champions: Bled (Centre); Beltinci (East); Dravograd (North); Bilje (West)
- Promoted: Beltinci; Bilje
- Relegated: Jesenice; Kolpa; Kočevje; Rudar Trbovlje; Lesce; Bohinj; Rakičan; Čarda; Bogojina; Slatina Radenci; Dobrovce; Šentjur; Korotan Prevalje; Lenart; Šmarje pri Jelšah; Ilirska Bistrica
- Matches: 658
- Goals: 2,259 (3.43 per match)
- Top goalscorer: Denis Petrovič (28 goals)
- Total attendance: 84,402
- Average attendance: 128

The 2017–18 Slovenian Third League was the 26th edition of the Slovenian Third League. The season began on 19 August 2017 and ended on 27 May 2018.

== Competition format and rules ==
The 2017–18 Slovenian Third League was divided into four regional groups with a total of 50 participating clubs. The three groups (North, Centre, East) were composed of 14 clubs, while the West group consisted of 8 clubs. The winners of the regular season in each group played a promotional two-legged play-off to decide the two teams promoting to the Slovenian Second League.

== 3. SNL Centre ==
=== Clubs ===
Location of teams in the 2017–18 Slovenian Third League Centre

Club	Location	Stadium	2016–17 position
Arne Tabor 69	Ljubljana (Brod)	Maksov Gaj	1st in MNZ Ljubljana
Bled	Bled	Bled Sports Centre	3rd
Bohinj	Bohinjska Bistrica	Danica	1st in MNZG-Kranj
Brinje Grosuplje	Grosuplje	Brinje Stadium	9th
Ivančna Gorica	Ivančna Gorica	Ivančna Gorica Stadium	4th
Jesenice	Jesenice	Podmežakla Stadium	2nd in MNZG-Kranj
Kočevje	Kočevje	Gaj Stadium	2nd in MNZ Ljubljana
Kolpa	Podzemelj	Podzemelj Sports Park	10th
Komenda	Komenda	Komenda Hipodrom	7th
Lesce	Lesce	Na Žagi Stadium	12th
Rudar	Trbovlje	Rudar Stadium	11th
Sava	Kranj	Stražišče Sports Park	8th
Šenčur	Šenčur	Šenčur Sports Park	6th
Zagorje	Zagorje ob Savi	Zagorje City Stadium	5th

=== League table ===
Pos	Team	Pld	W	D	L	GF	GA	GD	Pts	Qualification or relegation
1	Bled (C)	26	19	3	4	61	22	+39	60	Qualification to promotion play-offs
2	Brinje Grosuplje	26	18	4	4	70	27	+43	58	
3	Arne Tabor 69	26	16	3	7	54	24	+30	51	
4	Zagorje	26	15	4	7	56	26	+30	49	
5	Ivančna Gorica	26	15	3	8	57	48	+9	48	
6	Šenčur	26	12	6	8	60	35	+25	42	
7	Komenda	26	10	7	9	56	38	+18	37	
8	Sava Kranj	26	10	6	10	40	41	−1	36	
9	Jesenice (R)	26	10	5	11	51	42	+9	35	Relegation to Intercommunal Leagues
10	Kolpa (R)	26	10	4	12	41	35	+6	34	Relegation to Intercommunal Leagues
11	Kočevje (R)	26	6	4	16	34	63	−29	22	Relegation to Intercommunal Leagues
12	Rudar Trbovlje (R)	26	6	1	19	20	72	−52	19	Relegation to Intercommunal Leagues
13	Lesce (R)	26	4	2	20	25	83	−58	14	Relegation to Intercommunal Leagues
14	Bohinj (R)	26	3	4	19	32	101	−69	13	Relegation to Intercommunal Leagues

Source: MNZ Ljubljana (in Slovene) NZS (in Slovene)
Rules for classification: 1) points; 2) points in head-to-head matches; 3) goal difference in head-to-head matches; 4) away goals scored in head-to-head matches; 5) total goal difference; 6) total goals scored; 7) away goals scored in all matches; 8) fair-play; 9) draw
(C) Champions; (R) Relegated

== 3. SNL East ==
=== Clubs ===
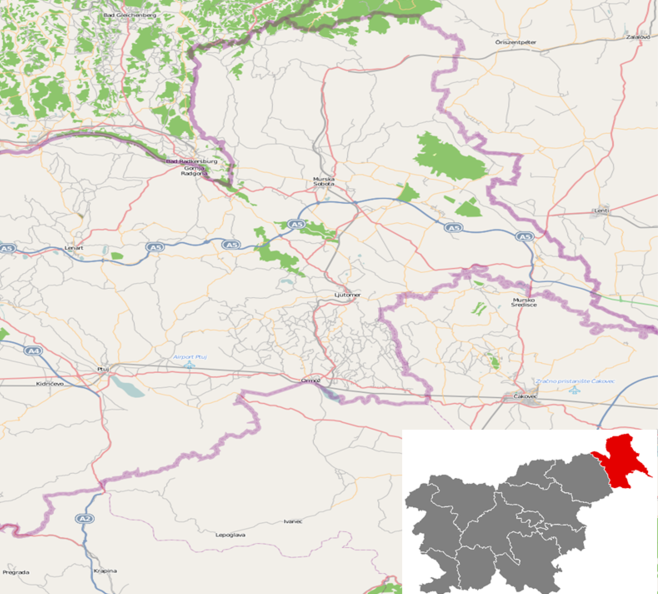
Location of teams in the 2017–18 Slovenian Third League East

Club	Location	Stadium	2016–17 position
Beltinci	Beltinci	Beltinci Sports Park	4th
Bogojina	Bogojina	ŠRC Bogojina	12th
Čarda	Martjanci	ŠRC Martjanci	8th
Črenšovci	Črenšovci	Črenšovci Sports Park	1st in MNZ Lendava
Grad	Grad	Igrišče Pod gradom	11th
Hotiza	Hotiza	Hotiza Sports Park	7th
Ljutomer	Ljutomer	Ljutomer Sports Park	5th
Odranci	Odranci	ŠRC Odranci	3rd
Polana	Velika Polana	PC Poljana	9th
Radgona	Gornja Radgona	Gornja Radgona Stadium	3rd in MNZ Murska Sobota
Rakičan	Rakičan	Grajski Park Stadium	10th
Tromejnik	Kuzma	Kuzma Football Stadium	6th
Turnišče	Turnišče	Turnišče Stadium	13th
Slatina Radenci	Radenci	ŠRC Radenci	4th in MNZ Murska Sobota

=== League table ===
Pos	Team	Pld	W	D	L	GF	GA	GD	Pts	Qualification or relegation
1	Beltinci (C, O, P)	26	20	4	2	62	21	+41	64	Promotion to 2018–19 Slovenian Second League
2	Odranci	26	18	3	5	62	29	+33	57	
3	Polana	26	18	3	5	73	26	+47	57	
4	Ljutomer	26	15	4	7	54	38	+16	49	
5	Hotiza	26	14	4	8	60	28	+32	46	
6	Grad	26	12	5	9	53	31	+22	41	
7	Tromejnik	26	10	6	10	44	41	+3	36	
8	Črenšovci	26	10	5	11	47	54	−7	35	
9	Rakičan^{1} (R)	26	9	5	12	39	46	−7	32	Relegation to Intercommunal Leagues
10	Turnišče	26	7	4	15	27	56	−29	25	
11	Radgona	26	6	4	16	20	57	−37	22	
12	Čarda (R)	26	5	5	16	30	48	−18	20	Relegation to Intercommunal Leagues
13	Bogojina (R)	26	6	1	19	23	74	−51	19	Relegation to Intercommunal Leagues
14	Slatina Radenci (R)	26	4	3	19	25	70	−45	15	Relegation to Intercommunal Leagues

Source: MNZ Lendava (in Slovene) NZS (in Slovene)
Rules for classification: 1) points; 2) points in head-to-head matches; 3) goal difference in head-to-head matches; 4) away goals scored in head-to-head matches; 5) total goal difference; 6) total goals scored; 7) away goals scored in all matches; 8) fair-play; 9) draw
(C) Champions; (O) Play-off winners; (P) Promoted; (R) Relegated

^{1 Rakičan was denied licence.}

== 3. SNL North ==
=== Clubs ===
Location of teams in the 2017–18 Slovenian Third League North

Club	Location	Stadium	2016–17 position
Bistrica	Slovenska Bistrica	Slovenska Bistrica Sports Park	7th in MNZ Ptuj
Dobrovce	Dobrovce	Dobrovce Sports Park	10th
Dravinja	Slovenske Konjice	Dobrava Stadium	8th
Dravograd	Dravograd	Dravograd Sports Centre	4th
Korotan Prevalje	Prevalje	Prevalje Stadium	5th
Lenart	Lenart	ŠRC Polena	12th
Mons Claudius	Rogatec	Rogatec Sports Centre	6th
Pesnica	Pesnica pri Mariboru	Pesnica Stadium	1st in MNZ Maribor
Pohorje	Ruše	Stadion NK Pohorje	2nd in MNZ Maribor
Šampion	Celje	Olimp	9th
Šentjur	Šentjur	Šentjur Sports Park	2nd in MNZ Celje
Šmarje	Šmarje pri Jelšah	Sports Park	7th
Videm	Videm pri Ptuju	Videm Sports Park	11th
Zreče	Zreče	Zreče Stadium	1st in MNZ Celje

=== League table ===
Pos	Team	Pld	W	D	L	GF	GA	GD	Pts	Qualification or relegation
1	Dravograd (C)	26	18	7	1	66	18	+48	61	Qualification to promotion play-offs
2	Šampion	26	17	8	1	60	19	+41	59	
3	Dravinja	26	13	7	6	49	27	+22	46	
4	Pesnica	26	13	6	7	39	30	+9	45	
5	Bistrica	26	11	8	7	40	32	+8	41	
6	Zreče	26	12	4	10	58	37	+21	40	
7	Videm	26	10	5	11	38	43	−5	35	
8	Pohorje	26	10	5	11	41	50	−9	35	
9	Mons Claudius	26	7	10	9	32	43	−11	31	
10	Dobrovce (R)	26	8	4	14	36	45	−9	28	Relegation to Intercommunal Leagues
11	Šentjur (R)	26	7	3	16	34	65	−31	24	Relegation to Intercommunal Leagues
12	Korotan Prevalje (R)	26	7	2	17	35	43	−8	23	Relegation to Intercommunal Leagues
13	Lenart (R)	26	7	2	17	30	64	−34	23	Relegation to Intercommunal Leagues
14	Šmarje pri Jelšah (R)	26	6	1	19	26	68	−42	19	Relegation to Intercommunal Leagues

Source: MNZ Celje (in Slovene) NZS (in Slovene)
Rules for classification: 1) points; 2) points in head-to-head matches; 3) goal difference in head-to-head matches; 4) away goals scored in head-to-head matches; 5) total goal difference; 6) total goals scored; 7) away goals scored in all matches; 8) fair-play; 9) draw
(C) Champions; (R) Relegated

== 3. SNL West ==
=== Clubs ===
Location of teams in the 2017–18 Slovenian Third League West

Club	Location	Stadium	2016–17 position
Adria	Miren	Igrišče Pri Štantu	3rd
Bilje	Bilje	Stadion V dolinci	4th
Ilirska Bistrica	Ilirska Bistrica	Trnovo Sports Centre	9th
Izola	Izola	Izola City Stadium	7th
Jadran Hrpelje-Kozina	Kozina	Krvavi potok	2nd in MNZ Koper
Primorje	Ajdovščina	Ajdovščina Stadium	8th
Tolmin	Tolmin	Brajda Sports Park	5th
Vipava	Vipava	Ob Beli Stadium	6th

=== League table ===
Pos	Team	Pld	W	D	L	GF	GA	GD	Pts	Qualification or relegation
1	Bilje (C, O, P)	28	18	9	1	81	17	+64	63	Promotion to 2018–19 Slovenian Second League
2	Tolmin	28	17	3	8	68	30	+38	54	
3	Izola	28	14	5	9	75	37	+38	47	
4	Adria	28	13	6	9	38	46	−8	45	
5	Vipava	28	12	8	8	61	41	+20	44	
6	Primorje	28	8	7	13	33	45	−12	31	
7	Jadran Hrpelje-Kozina	28	7	3	18	28	66	−38	24	
8	Ilirska Bistrica (R)	28	2	1	25	15	117	−102	7	Relegation to Intercommunal Leagues

Source: MNZ Koper (in Slovene) NZS (in Slovene)
Rules for classification: 1) points; 2) points in head-to-head matches; 3) goal difference in head-to-head matches; 4) away goals scored in head-to-head matches; 5) total goal difference; 6) total goals scored; 7) away goals scored in all matches; 8) fair-play; 9) draw
(C) Champions; (O) Play-off winners; (P) Promoted; (R) Relegated

== Play-offs ==
A two-legged play-offs between the group winners for promotion to the 2018–19 Slovenian Second League.

=== First leg ===
30 May 2018	Bilje	2–1	Dravograd	Bilje
17:00 CEST	Humar 54'; Žižmond 71'	Report	Štruc 29'	Stadium: V Dolinci Stadium; Attendance: 500; Referee: Asmir Sagrković

2 June 2018	Beltinci	1–1	Bled	Beltinci
17:00 CEST	Mauko 10'	Report	Pašić 19'	Stadium: Beltinci Sports Park; Attendance: 800; Referee: Rade Obrenović

=== Second leg ===
2 June 2018	Dravograd	0–0 (1–2 agg.)	Bilje	Dravograd
16:00 CEST		Report		Stadium: Dravograd Sports Centre; Attendance: 750; Referee: Bojan Mertik

6 June 2018	Bled	0–1 (1–2 agg.)	Beltinci	Bled
17:00 CEST		Report	Tkalec 56'	Stadium: Bled Sports Centre; Attendance: 400; Referee: Mitja Žganec

== See also ==
- 2017–18 Slovenian PrvaLiga
- 2017–18 Slovenian Second League
