= 2018–19 Slovenian Third League =

Slovenian Third League
- Season: 2018–19
- Champions: Bled (Centre); Grad (East); Dravograd (North); Koper (West)
- Promoted: Dravograd; Koper
- Relegated: Zagorje; Ivančna Gorica; Komenda; Polana; Črenšovci; Turnišče; Tromejnik; Hotiza; Pesnica; Pohorje; Mons Claudius; Plama Podgrad; Jadran Hrpelje-Kozina

The 2018–19 Slovenian Third League was the 27th edition of the Slovenian Third League. The season began on 17 August 2018 and ended on 2 June 2019.

== Competition format and rules ==
In the 2018–19 season, the Slovenian Third League (3. SNL) was divided into four regional groups with a total of 38 participating clubs. The three groups (North, Centre, East) were composed of ten clubs, while the West group consisted of eight clubs. The group winners played a two-legged play-off for promotion to the Slovenian Second League.

== 3. SNL Centre ==
Zarica Kranj withdrew and were replaced by Žiri one week before the start of the season.

=== Clubs ===
Location of teams in the 2018–19 Slovenian Third League Centre

Club	Location	Stadium	2017–18 position
Arne Tabor 69	Ljubljana (Brod)	Maksov Gaj	3rd
Bled	Bled	Bled Sports Centre	1st
Brinje Grosuplje	Grosuplje	Brinje Stadium	2nd
Ivančna Gorica	Ivančna Gorica	Ivančna Gorica Stadium	5th
Komenda	Komenda	Komenda Hipodrom	7th
Sava	Kranj	Stražišče Sports Park	8th
Svoboda Ljubljana	Ljubljana	Svoboda Sports Park	1st in MNZ Ljubljana
Šenčur	Šenčur	Šenčur Sports Park	6th
Zagorje	Zagorje ob Savi	Zagorje City Stadium	4th
Žiri	Žiri	Polje Stadium	1st in MNZG Kranj

=== League table ===
Pos	Team	Pld	W	D	L	GF	GA	GD	Pts	Qualification or relegation
1	Bled (C)	27	19	6	2	62	21	+41	63	Qualification to promotion play-offs
2	Zagorje (R)	27	14	6	7	47	40	+7	48	Relegation to Intercommunal Leagues
3	Ivančna Gorica (R)	27	13	5	9	48	40	+8	44	Relegation to Intercommunal Leagues
4	Brinje Grosuplje	27	12	7	8	51	35	+16	43	
5	Arne Tabor 69	27	9	7	11	38	39	−1	34	
6	Svoboda Ljubljana	27	7	11	9	44	52	−8	32	
7	Šenčur	27	9	4	14	38	55	−17	31	
8	Žiri	27	7	8	12	44	49	−5	29	
9	Sava Kranj	27	6	8	13	37	49	−12	26	
10	Komenda (R)	27	4	8	15	32	61	−29	20	Relegation to Intercommunal Leagues

Source: NZS
Rules for classification: 1) points; 2) points in head-to-head matches; 3) goal difference in head-to-head matches; 4) away goals scored in head-to-head matches; 5) total goal difference; 6) total goals scored; 7) away goals scored in all matches; 8) fair-play; 9) draw
(C) Champions; (R) Relegated

== 3. SNL East ==
=== Clubs ===
A total of ten teams competed in the league, including nine sides from the 2017–18 season and one team relegated from the 2017–18 Slovenian Second League (Veržej).

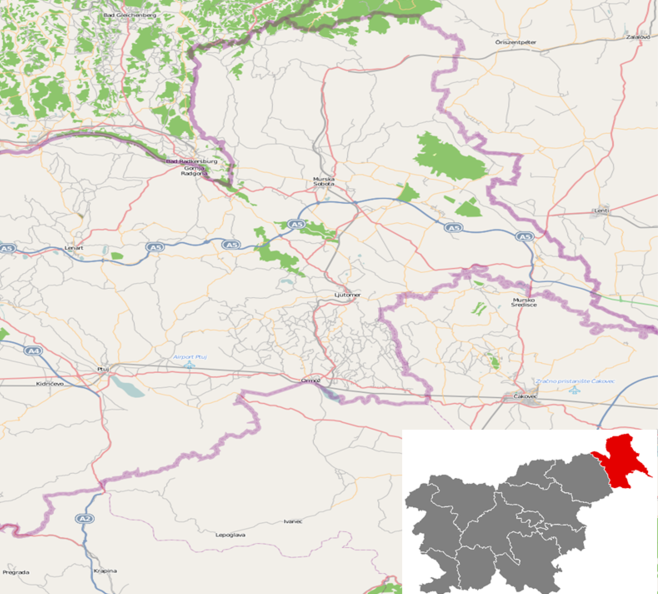
Location of teams in the 2018–19 Slovenian Third League East

Club	Location	Stadium	2017–18 position
Črenšovci	Črenšovci	Črenšovci Sports Park	8th
Grad	Grad	Igrišče Pod gradom	6th
Hotiza	Hotiza	Hotiza Sports Park	5th
Ljutomer	Ljutomer	Ljutomer Sports Park	4th
Odranci	Odranci	ŠRC Odranci	2nd
Polana	Velika Polana	PC Poljana	3rd
Radgona	Gornja Radgona	Gornja Radgona Stadium	11th
Tromejnik	Kuzma	Kuzma Football Stadium	7th
Turnišče	Turnišče	Turnišče Stadium	10th
Veržej	Veržej	Čistina Stadium	16th in 2. SNL

=== League table ===
Pos	Team	Pld	W	D	L	GF	GA	GD	Pts	Qualification or relegation
1	Grad (C, R)	27	18	6	3	63	25	+38	60	Qualification to promotion play-offs
2	Odranci	27	17	8	2	62	26	+36	59	
3	Polana (R)	27	16	4	7	57	39	+18	52	Relegation to Intercommunal Leagues
4	Ljutomer	27	13	8	6	59	42	+17	47	
5	Veržej	27	11	8	8	47	41	+6	41	
6	Črenšovci (R)	27	10	2	15	39	65	−26	32	Relegation to Intercommunal Leagues
7	Turnišče (R)	27	7	6	14	36	59	−23	27	Relegation to Intercommunal Leagues
8	Tromejnik (R)	27	7	3	17	39	59	−20	24	Relegation to Intercommunal Leagues
9	Hotiza (R)	27	4	8	15	29	51	−22	20	Relegation to Intercommunal Leagues
10	Radgona	27	3	5	19	28	52	−24	14	

Source: NZS
Rules for classification: 1) points; 2) points in head-to-head matches; 3) goal difference in head-to-head matches; 4) away goals scored in head-to-head matches; 5) total goal difference; 6) total goals scored; 7) away goals scored in all matches; 8) fair-play; 9) draw
(C) Champions; (R) Relegated

== 3. SNL North ==
=== Clubs ===
Location of teams in the 2018–19 Slovenian Third League North

Club	Location	Stadium	2017–18 position
Bistrica	Slovenska Bistrica	Slovenska Bistrica Sports Park	5th
Dravinja	Slovenske Konjice	Dobrava Stadium	3rd
Dravograd	Dravograd	Dravograd Sports Centre	1st
Mons Claudius	Rogatec	Rogatec Sports Centre	9th
Pesnica	Pesnica pri Mariboru	Pesnica Stadium	4th
Pohorje	Ruše	Stadion NK Pohorje	8th
Šampion	Celje	Olimp	2nd
Šmartno 1928	Šmartno ob Paki	Šmartno Stadium	1st in MNZ Celje
Videm	Videm pri Ptuju	Videm Sports Park	7th
Zreče	Zreče	Zreče Stadium	6th

=== League table ===
Pos	Team	Pld	W	D	L	GF	GA	GD	Pts	Qualification or relegation
1	Dravograd (C, O, P)	25	16	0	9	60	51	+9	48	Promotion to 2019–20 Slovenian Second League
2	Dravinja	25	13	4	8	54	45	+9	43	
3	Šmartno 1928	25	13	3	9	58	47	+11	42	
4	Bistrica	25	12	5	8	45	28	+17	41	
5	Videm	25	12	4	9	45	33	+12	40	
6	Šampion	25	12	4	9	49	35	+14	40	
7	Zreče	25	10	6	9	36	35	+1	36	
8	Pesnica (R)	25	5	4	16	24	62	−38	19	Relegation to Intercommunal Leagues
9	Pohorje (R)	25	5	2	18	48	78	−30	17	Relegation to Intercommunal Leagues
10	Mons Claudius (R)	9	2	2	5	11	16	−5	8	Withdrew during the season; relegated to MNZ Celje

Source: NZS
Rules for classification: 1) points; 2) points in head-to-head matches; 3) goal difference in head-to-head matches; 4) away goals scored in head-to-head matches; 5) total goal difference; 6) total goals scored; 7) away goals scored in all matches; 8) fair-play; 9) draw
(C) Champions; (O) Play-off winners; (P) Promoted; (R) Relegated

== 3. SNL West ==
=== Clubs ===
Location of teams in the 2018–19 Slovenian Third League West

Club	Location	Stadium	2017–18 position
Adria	Miren	Igrišče Pri Štantu	4th
Izola	Izola	Izola City Stadium	3rd
Jadran Hrpelje-Kozina	Kozina	Krvavi potok	7th
Koper	Koper	Bonifika Stadium	1st in Littoral League
Plama Podgrad	Podgrad	OŠ Rudolf Ukovič	2nd in Littoral League
Primorje	Ajdovščina	Ajdovščina Stadium	6th
Tolmin	Tolmin	Brajda Sports Park	2nd
Vipava	Vipava	Ob Beli Stadium	5th

=== League table ===
Pos	Team	Pld	W	D	L	GF	GA	GD	Pts	Qualification or relegation
1	Koper (C, O, P)	28	23	2	3	111	15	+96	71	Promotion to 2019–20 Slovenian Second League
2	Tolmin	28	18	6	4	78	36	+42	60	
3	Vipava	28	16	5	7	51	33	+18	53	
4	Primorje	28	13	4	11	44	42	+2	43	
5	Adria	28	12	3	13	50	48	+2	39	
6	Izola	28	8	4	16	31	50	−19	28	
7	Plama Podgrad (R)	28	4	4	20	27	84	−57	16	Relegation to Intercommunal Leagues
8	Jadran Hrpelje-Kozina (R)	28	1	6	21	11	95	−84	9	Relegation to Intercommunal Leagues

Source: NZS
Rules for classification: 1) points; 2) points in head-to-head matches; 3) goal difference in head-to-head matches; 4) away goals scored in head-to-head matches; 5) total goal difference; 6) total goals scored; 7) away goals scored in all matches; 8) fair-play; 9) draw
(C) Champions; (O) Play-off winners; (P) Promoted; (R) Relegated

== Play-offs ==
To determine the teams that would qualify for the 2019–20 Slovenian Second League, a two-legged play-off was played between the group winners.

=== First leg ===
5 June 2019	Dravograd	2–1	Bled	Dravograd
17:00 CEST	Kogelnik 16'; Adomako 68'	Report	Stanko 66'	Stadium: Dravograd Sports Centre; Attendance: 1,100; Referee: Dejan Balažič

5 June 2019	Koper	4–0	Grad	Koper
18:00 CEST	Bernjak 1' (o.g.); Baša 37' (pen.), 77' (pen.); Tomić 78'	Report		Stadium: Bonifika; Attendance: 1,000; Referee: Andrej Žnidaršič

=== Second leg ===
9 June 2019	Bled	0–0 (1–2 agg.)	Dravograd	Bled
17:00 CEST		Report		Stadium: Bled Sports Park; Attendance: 400; Referee: Mihael Antič

9 June 2019	Grad	0–4 (0–8 agg.)	Koper	Grad
17:00 CEST		Report	Sačer 32'; Cerovec 37'; Gajšek 59'; Tomić 68'	Stadium: Igrišče pod Gradom; Attendance: 500; Referee: Alen Borošak

== See also ==
- 2018–19 Slovenian First League
- 2018–19 Slovenian Second League
