= 2015–16 Slovenian Third League =

Slovenian Third League
- Season: 2015–16
- Champions: Ilirija (Centre); Beltinci (East); Brežice 1919 (North); Brda (West)
- Promoted: Brežice 1919; Brda
- Relegated: Žiri; Jesenice; Jezero Medvode; Bakovci; Črenšovci; Radlje; Podvinci; Cerknica
- Matches: 681
- Goals: 2,261 (3.32 per match)
- Top goalscorer: Jernej Tkalec (30 goals)
- Biggest home win: Bravo 12–1 Jezero
- Biggest away win: Črešnovci 1–11 Tromejnik
- Highest scoring: Bravo 12–1 Jezero

The 2015–16 Slovenian Third League began on 22 August 2015 and ended on 29 May 2016 with playoffs being played on 4 and 8 June 2016.

== Competition format and rules ==
The 2015–16 Slovenian Third League was divided into four regional groups with a total of 52 participating clubs. Three groups (i.e. North, Centre, East) were composed of 14 clubs, while the group West only had 10 clubs that were participating in the competition. The winners of the regular season in each group played a promotional two-legged play-offs to decide which two teams promoted to the Slovenian Second League. Reserve teams of the top division sides were ineligible to promote to the second division, due to the rules of the Football Association of Slovenia, which stipulated that one club's main squad and their reserve team must be at least two leagues apart in the country's football pyramid. Consequently, in case one club's main squad would get relegated from the top division to the second division their reserve team would be automatically relegated from the third division.

The number of relegated teams from each group was determined by the number of regional MNZ's from which the clubs in all four groups were a part of.

- MNZ Celje (North)
- MNZ Maribor (North)
- MNZ Ptuj (North)
- MNZG-Kranj (Centre)
- MNZ Ljubljana (Centre)
- MNZ Lendava (East)
- MNZ Murska Sobota (East)
- MNZ Koper (West)
- MNZ Nova Gorica (West)

This meant that three teams from 3. SNL North were relegated at the end of the season and replaced by the winners of the fourth tier competitions held separately in MNZ Celje, MNZ Maribor and MNZ Ptuj. The number of relegated teams from 3. SNL Centre and 3. SNL East was two, while only the bottom team was relegated from 3. SNL West as MNZ Koper and MNZ Nova Gorica managed a combined fourth tier competition. The number of relegated teams was also determined by the location of teams which relegated from the second division.

== 3. SNL Centre ==
=== Clubs ===
Club	Location	Stadium	2014–15 position
Žiri	Žiri	Polje Stadium	MNZG-Kranj, 3rd
Bled	Bled	Bled Sports Centre	8th
Brinje Grosuplje	Grosuplje	Brinje Stadium	MNZ Ljubljana, 2nd
Bravo	Ljubljana	ŽAK Stadium	MNZ Ljubljana, 1st
Ilirija	Ljubljana	Ilirija Sports Park	2nd
Ivančna Gorica	Ivančna Gorica	Ivančna Gorica Stadium	3rd
Jesenice	Jesenice	Podmežakla Stadium	MNZG-Kranj, 2nd
Jezero	Medvode	Ob Sori Stadium	9th
Kolpa	Podzemelj	Podzemelj Sports Park	10th
Komenda	Komenda	Komenda Hipodrom	12th
Lesce	Lesce	Na Žagi Stadium	11th
Rudar Trbovlje	Trbovlje	Rudar Stadium	7th
Sava	Kranj	Stražišče Sports Park	6th
Zagorje	Zagorje ob Savi	Zagorje City Stadium	4th

=== League table ===
Pos	Team	Pld	W	D	L	GF	GA	GD	Pts	Qualification or relegation
1	Ilirija (C, Q)	26	18	5	3	73	19	+54	59	Qualified for play-offs
2	Bravo	26	18	4	4	79	28	+51	58	
3	Ivančna Gorica	26	17	4	5	45	13	+32	55	
4	Komenda	26	13	4	9	47	37	+10	43	
5	Sava Kranj	26	13	4	9	45	40	+5	43	
6	Zagorje	26	11	5	10	52	37	+15	38	
7	Kolpa	26	11	5	10	36	39	−3	38	
8	Brinje	26	9	6	11	31	39	−8	33	
9	Bled	26	8	8	10	36	37	−1	32	
10	Rudar Trbovlje	26	9	4	13	36	52	−16	31	
11	Lesce	26	7	8	11	28	45	−17	29	
12	Žiri (R)	26	6	5	15	27	59	−32	23	Relegation to MNZG-Kranj (Note: Žiri were relegated because Šenčur got relegated from the second league to the 3. SNL – Centre)
13	Jesenice (R)	26	5	4	17	19	52	−33	19	Relegated to MNZG-Kranj
14	Jezero Medvode (R)	26	2	4	20	18	75	−57	10	Relegated to MNZ Ljubljana (Note: Jezero Medvode discontinued its senior team after the season.)

Source: MNZG-Kranj (in Slovene)
Rules for classification: 1) points; 2) points in head-to-head matches; 3) goal difference in head-to-head matches; 4) goals scored in head-to-head matches; 5) total goal difference; 6) total goals scored
(C) Champions; (Q) Qualified for the phase indicated; (R) Relegated

== 3. SNL East ==
=== Clubs ===
Club	Location	Stadium	2014–15 position
Bakovci	Bakovci	ŠRC Bakovci	12th
Beltinci	Beltinci	Beltinci Sports Park	2nd
Čarda	Martjanci	ŠRC Martjanci	10th
Črenšovci	Črenšovci	Črenšovci Sports Park	11th
Grad	Grad	Igrišče Pod gradom	4th
Križevci	Križevci	Križevci Sports Park	MNZ Murska Sobota, 1st
Nafta 1903	Lendava	Lendava Sports Park	9th
Ljutomer	Ljutomer	Ljutomer Sports Park	5th
Mura	Murska Sobota	Fazanerija	3rd
Odranci	Odranci	ŠRC Odranci	1st
Rakičan	Rakičan	Grajski Park Stadium	8th
Tromejnik	Kuzma	Kuzma Football Stadium	6th
Turnišče	Turnišče	Turnišče Stadium	7th
Polana	Velika Polana	PC Poljana	MNZ Lendava, 2nd

=== League table ===
Pos	Team	Pld	W	D	L	GF	GA	GD	Pts	Qualification or relegation
1	Beltinci (C, Q)	26	20	2	4	67	26	+41	62	Qualified for play-offs
2	Mura	26	18	3	5	66	15	+51	57	
3	Odranci	26	16	4	6	59	38	+21	52	
4	Tromejnik	26	15	5	6	63	27	+36	50	
5	Polana	26	12	6	8	55	48	+7	42	
6	Ljutomer	26	12	4	10	31	29	+2	40	
7	Nafta 1903	26	11	5	10	54	49	+5	38	
8	Turnišče	26	10	4	12	31	47	−16	34	
9	Grad	26	9	3	14	37	44	−7	30	
10	Križevci	26	6	10	10	33	40	−7	28	
11	Čarda	26	8	4	14	40	59	−19	28	
12	Rakičan	26	4	7	15	21	51	−30	19	
13	Bakovci (R)	26	3	9	14	22	53	−31	18	Relegated to MNZ Murska Sobota
14	Črenšovci (R)	26	4	2	20	24	77	−53	14	Relegated to MNZ Lendava

Source: MNZ Murska Sobota (in Slovene)
Rules for classification: 1) points; 2) points in head-to-head matches; 3) goal difference in head-to-head matches; 4) goals scored in head-to-head matches; 5) total goal difference; 6) total goals scored
(C) Champions; (Q) Qualified for the phase indicated; (R) Relegated

== 3. SNL North ==
=== Clubs ===
Club	Location	Stadium	2014–15 position
Brežice 1919	Brežice	Brežice Stadium	MNZ Celje, 1st
Dobrovce	Miklavž	Dobrovce Sports Park	MNZ Maribor, 1st
Dravinja	Slovenske Konjice	Dobrava Stadium	2. SNL, 9th
Dravograd	Dravograd	Dravograd Sports Centre	4th
Fužinar	Ravne na Koroškem	City Stadium	6th
Lenart	Lenart	ŠRC Polena	10th
Maribor B	Maribor	Tabor Sports Park	1st
Mons Claudius	Rogatec	Rogatec Sports Centre	8th
Podvinci	Podvinci	Podvinci Stadium	3rd
Radlje	Radlje ob Dravi	Radlje ob Dravi Stadium	9th
Šampion	Celje	Olimp	7th
Šmarje	Šmarje pri Jelšah	Sports Park	5th
Šmartno 1928	Šmartno ob Paki	Šmartno Stadium	2. SNL, 10th
Videm	Videm pri Ptuju	Videm Sports Park	MNZ Ptuj, 1st

=== League table ===
Pos	Team	Pld	W	D	L	GF	GA	GD	Pts	Qualification or relegation
1	Brežice 1919 (C, Q)	26	21	3	2	69	22	+47	66	Qualified for play-offs
2	Maribor B (Note: Maribor B was ineligible for promotion)	26	18	7	1	102	24	+78	61	
3	Šampion	26	17	4	5	74	34	+40	55	
4	Videm	26	13	7	6	51	44	+7	46	
5	Šmarje pri Jelšah	26	13	6	7	59	40	+19	45	
6	Fužinar	26	13	4	9	44	50	−6	43	
7	Mons Claudius	26	13	3	10	41	34	+7	42	
8	Dravograd	26	9	6	11	42	42	0	33	
9	Lenart	26	9	2	15	41	60	−19	29	
10	Dobrovce	26	7	2	17	48	73	−25	23	
11	Dravinja	26	5	7	14	34	56	−22	22	
12	Šmartno 1928	26	5	6	15	31	58	−27	21	(Note: Šmartno was spared from relegation because group winner (Brežice 1919) won the promotion)
13	Radlje (R)	26	5	4	17	23	57	−34	19	Relegated to MNZ Maribor
14	Podvinci (R)	26	3	1	22	18	83	−65	10	Relegated to MNZ Ptuj

Source: MNZ Maribor (in Slovene)
Rules for classification: 1) points; 2) points in head-to-head matches; 3) goal difference in head-to-head matches; 4) goals scored in head-to-head matches; 5) total goal difference; 6) total goals scored
(C) Champions; (Q) Qualified for the phase indicated; (R) Relegated

== 3. SNL West ==
=== Clubs ===
Club	Location	Stadium	2014–15 position
Adria	Miren	Igrišče Pri Štantu	8th
Ajdovščina Škou	Ajdovščina	Ajdovščina Stadium	1st
Bilje	Bilje	Stadion V dolinci	4th
Brda	Dobrovo	Vipolže Stadium	3rd
Cerknica	Cerknica	Koleno Stadium	9th
Ilirska Bistrica	Ilirska Bistrica	Trnovo Sports Centre	7th
Izola	Izola	Izola City Stadium	2nd
Jadran	Dekani	Dekani Sports Park	5th
Tabor	Sežana	Rajko Štolfa Stadium	6th
Vipava	Vipava	Ob Beli Stadium	MNZ Nova Gorica, 1st

=== League table ===
Pos	Team	Pld	W	D	L	GF	GA	GD	Pts	Qualification or relegation
1	Brda (C, Q)	27	16	6	5	70	22	+48	54	Qualified for play-offs
2	Ajdovščina Škou	27	16	5	6	54	28	+26	53	
3	Jadran Dekani	27	16	4	7	49	20	+29	52	
4	Adria	27	12	7	8	43	33	+10	43	
5	Vipava	27	13	2	12	42	56	−14	41	
6	Bilje	27	12	2	13	37	43	−6	38	
7	Tabor Sežana	27	10	7	10	40	42	−2	37	
8	Izola	27	10	4	13	31	38	−7	34	
9	Ilirska Bistrica	27	6	3	18	22	52	−30	21	
10	Cerknica (R)	27	1	6	20	21	75	−54	9	Relegated to MNZ Koper

Source: MNZ Nova Gorica (in Slovene)
Rules for classification: 1) points; 2) points in head-to-head matches; 3) goal difference in head-to-head matches; 4) goals scored in head-to-head matches; 5) total goal difference; 6) total goals scored
(C) Champions; (Q) Qualified for the phase indicated; (R) Relegated

== Play-offs ==
A two-legged play-offs between the group winners for promotion to the Slovenian Second League.

=== First leg ===
4 June 2016	Brda	0–0	Beltinci	Vipolže
18:00 CEST		Report (in Slovene)		Stadium: Vipolže Stadium; Attendance: 400; Referee: Andrej Žnidaršič

4 June 2016	Ilirija	0–4	Brežice 1919	Ljubljana
18:00 CEST		Report (in Slovene)	Jeleć 45'; Drugovič 64' (pen.), 73'; Turk 84'	Stadium: Ilirija Sports Park; Attendance: 900; Referee: Alen Borošak

=== Second leg ===
8 June 2016	Beltinci	1–2 (1–2 agg.)	Brda	Beltinci
17:00 CEST	Kosi 7'	Report (in Slovene)	Debenjak 6'; Kodermac 90'	Stadium: Beltinci Sports Park; Attendance: 2,000; Referee: Vojko Goričan

8 June 2016	Brežice 1919	0–2 (4–2 agg.)	Ilirija	Brežice
18:00 CEST		Report (in Slovene)	Heljezović 56'; Đoković 80'	Stadium: Brežice Stadium; Attendance: 1,300; Referee: Roman Glažar

Brda and Brežice 1919 were promoted to the Slovenian Second League.

== See also ==
- 2015–16 Slovenian PrvaLiga
- 2015–16 Slovenian Second League
