= ŠNK Radgona =

Slovenian football club

Radgona
- Full name: Športno nogometni klub Radgona
- Nicknames: Belo-plavi (The Blue and Whites)
- Founded: 1946; 80 years ago (as FD Gornja Radgona)
- Ground: Gornja Radgona Stadium
- Capacity: 500 (301 seated)
- President: Emil Bračko
- Website: www.snk-radgona.org

Športno nogometni klub Radgona (English: Sports Football Club Radgona) or simply ŠNK Radgona is a Slovenian football club from the town of Gornja Radgona. The club was established in 1946 as FD Gornja Radgona and plays its home matches at the Gornja Radgona Stadium, located in the Gornja Radgona Sports Park, with a seating capacity for 301 spectators.

Their earliest success dates back to the 1960–61 season when the club won the Pomurska League, the fifth tier of Yugoslav football. In the 2018–19 season, the club achieved its highest-ever finish in the Slovenian football pyramid, when they played in the East division of the Slovenian Third League and finished in tenth place. Radgona made its debut in the Slovenian Cup in 1992–93, when it was eliminated in the first round.

The club has built a rivalry with Radenska Slatina from the town of Radenci, with whom they contest the "Neighbourhood derby" (Slovene: Sosedski derbi). The club colours are blue and white.

== Club history ==
=== Yugoslav period: 1946–1991 ===
The club was established in 1946 as Fizkulturno društvo Gornja Radgona or simply FD Gornja Radgona. The oldest recorded match of FD Gornja Radgona was played on 30 May 1946 against FD Štrigora, with Radgona winning 4–3. The club's first home ground was near today's fairgrounds in the town of Gornja Radgona.

In the summer of 1951, the Football Association of Slovenia established the Pomurska League, where Radgona competed during the 1951–52 season. The club has won the Pomurska League in the 1960–61 season, finishing top of the league one point above second-placed Turnišče. After the season, the Pomurska League was divided into two levels (level 1 and level 2), with Radgona being placed in level 1 along with seven other teams; Radgona won the Pomurska League level 1 in the 1961–62 season after winning 3–1 against Nafta Lendava on the last match day and was thus effectively promoted to the Slovenian Zonal League. During this season the club also competed with a reserve team.

In the 1962–63 season, Radgona joined the newly-formed Maribor-Murska Sobota League, organised by MNZ Murska Sobota. The league was disbanded in 1965 and MNZ formed the East Zonal League in its place. Radgona finished the 1965–66 season as runners-up of the Pomurska League, one point behind the league winners Tehnostroj, and thus advanced to the Slovenian Zonal League; however, they were immediately relegated back to the Pomurska League for the 1967–68 season. In the 1968–69 season, the club was relegated to the MNZ level after finishing last in the Pomurska League. For the 1977–78 season, the league system was changed as MNZ Lendava was established, meaning that the teams based near Lendava competed separately from the teams near Murska Sobota. Since 1976 the club plays their home matches at TŠC Trate (Slovene: Turistično-športni center Trate).

=== Slovenian period: 1991–2014 ===
After Slovenia gained independence from Yugoslavia, NK Radgona's staff approached to upgrade the club (upgrading the clubs changing room and its infrastructure) with financial help from the Municipality of Gornja Radgona. In 1991 the club renamed to NK Remet Radgona due to sponsorship reasons with financial help from the local company Remet, which was crucial for the club's further existence. The club was successful in the 1991–92 campaign by winning the 2. MNL (level 5), finishing first above second-placed Apače.

In the 1992–93 season, Radgona competed in the first round of the Slovenian Cup (qualified through winning the MNZ Cup the previous season), where they were eliminated by a second division side Triglav Kranj with a score of 5–0.

In the 1993–94 season they finished third in the 1. MNL (level 4). In 1994, the club opened six selections for youth players (under-8, under-10, under-12, under-14 and under-18) which meant they now had an appropriate number of younger selections to start competing at higher levels of Slovenian football leagues. The club registered about 120 youth players that year.

In July 1995, the club, through mutual agreement with MNZ Murska Sobota, transferred to a different league system to compete in the MNZ Maribor leagues. Between the 1995–96 and 2000–01 seasons, Radgona competed in the Intercommunal Leagues organised by MNZ Maribor, before transferring back to MNZ Murska Sobota starting with the 2001–02 season. The club remained undefeated in the 2001–02 season in the 2. MNL (fifth level of Slovenian football) and earned promotion to the fourth tier after finishing top of the league. Radgona were promoted from the fourth tier in the 2002–03 season after finishing second behind Cven. After Cven withdrew from all competitions, Radgona were invited to play in the Third Division for the first time in their history. In their first third division season, they finished eleventh and got relegated to the lower tier. The season saw nine clubs relegate to the Intercommunal Leagues, because the 2003–04 Slovenian Third League consisted of four divisions (East, West, North and Centre), and for the following season the number of groups was reduced to just two (East and West). During their season in the third tier, their highest home attendance was 300 spectators watching the match against Beltinci on 16 August 2003. The club's highest win occurred on 6 September 2003 when they defeated Tromejnik at home with the score of 7–3.

After the 2003–04 season, when the club was relegated from the Slovenian Third League, Radgona played non-league football below the third tier of Slovenian football. In the 2004–05 season they finished bottom of the Pomurska League. They did not enter any competition for the 2005–06 season which automatically puts them on the bottom of the football pyramid.

After one season without competing, the club entered the 2. MNL (sixth tier) where they finished as league winners and were promoted to the fifth tier. Radgona won 17 matches and lost just two while scoring a total of 77 goals and conceding 21.

In 2007 the club renamed from NK Arcont Radgona to ŠNK Radgona.

In the 2008–09 season, the club reached the semi-final of the MNZ Cup where they lost against Serdica. In the 2009–10 season, ŠNK Radgona finished bottom of the league and were relegated back to the sixth tier. The team won only one match and finished the league campaign with a goal difference of –52. In 2010 the home pitch of the club received flood lights. The entire project cost €10,000, the costs were paid by the Municipality of Gornja Radgona.

Radgona finished third consecutively in the 2010–11 and 2011–12 seasons in the 2. MNL (sixth tier). At the beginning of the 2011–12 season Aleksander Kerslin was head coach of the team. He was replaced by Nenad Dolgov in early October. After the first half of the 2011–12 season Robert Petrovič agreed a three-year contract as head coach of the team.

After the 2011–12 season, the 1. MNL and 2. MNL merged into one league and the Pomurska League was discontinued. Finishing ninth, Radgona were transferred to a lower tier since the 2. MNL was formed again for the 2013–14 season. The 2012–13 season was a big step forward for ŠNK Radgona as they established the youth selections, from under-6 to under-12.

In 2013–14, they finished as the runners-up of the 2. MNL League (fifth division) after drawing their final two games, including a home head-to-head matchup against title contenders Roma which ended in a 1–1 draw. Although they finished second, the club earned promotion to the fourth level for the first time since the 2004–05 season.

=== New stadium and third division: 2014–2020 ===
In 2014 the club adopted a new crest to represent the team, starting with the 2014–15 season.

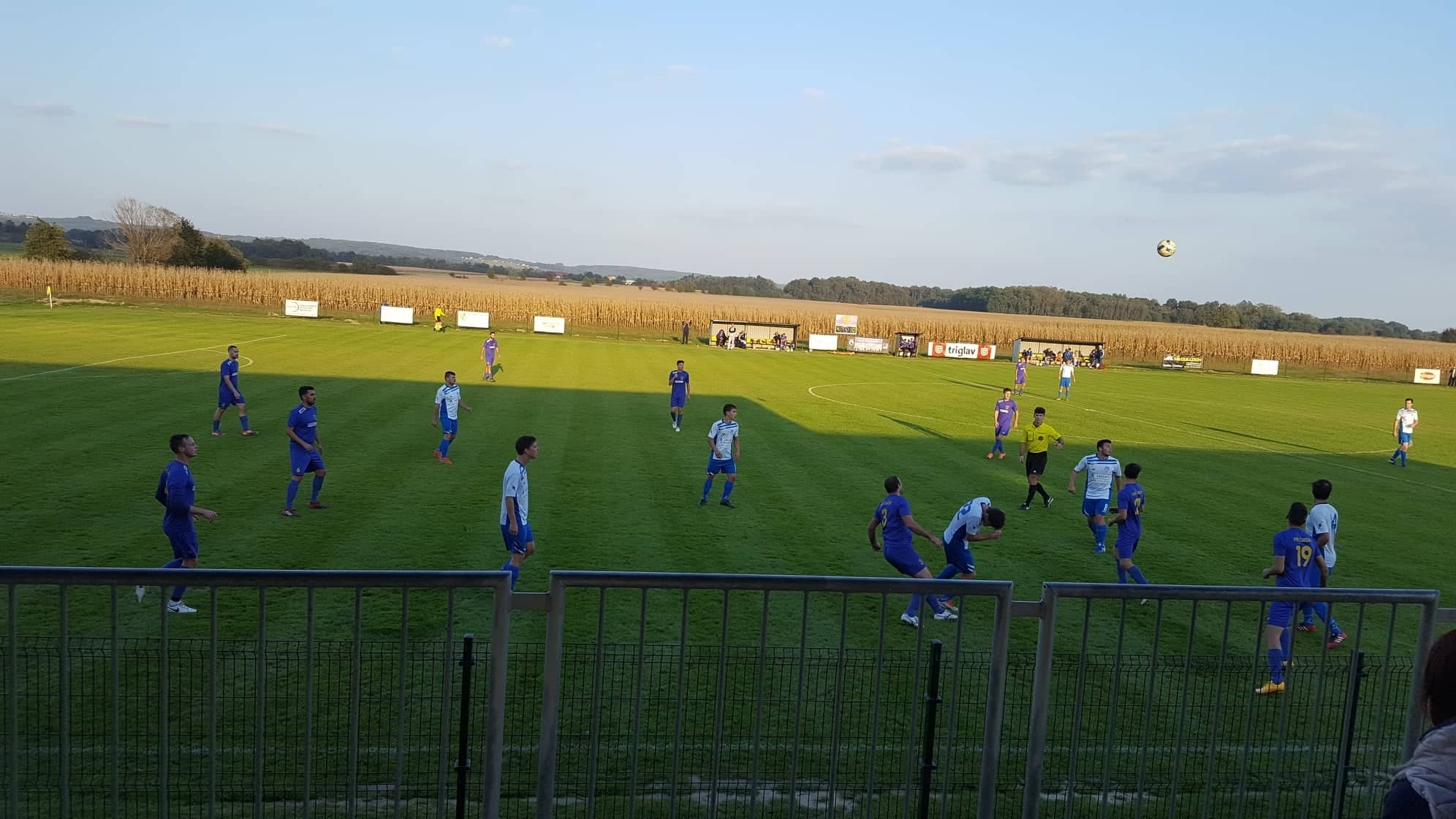
Radgona playing away against Čarda in 2017.

At the beginning of the 2014–15 season the construction of the new stands for the Sports Park was completed with a seating capacity of 301. The club used the stands for home matches for the first time during the season. On 20 July 2015 Radgona hosted Slovenian champions NK Maribor in a pre-season friendly which was the official opening of the newly build stands. Jean-Philippe Mendy opened the scoring in the first minute in front of 1,000 spectators and after a brace from Marcos Tavares, the visitors had a five-goal lead by half time. In the second half Radgona scored two own goals and substitute striker Dalibor Volaš scored four goals for the final score of 0–12.

After Radgona started the season with defeats to Hodoš, Križevci, and Tišina, the team was bottom of the league. The season also saw the team scoring ten goals on two occasions, against Roma and Cankova. Under management of Robert Petrovič the team finished fifth in the league with a win on the last match day at home against rivals Slatina Radenci with the score of 2–0. In the MNZ Murska Sobota Cup, the team eliminated Serdica in the first round before being knocked out by Mura after a penalty shootout. After the season, manager Robert Petrovič left to continue his coaching career in Austria. In the summer of 2015 Franc Hauko was selected as new head coach of the team.

The 2015–16 season was one of the most successful in the club's history as they were in the title race for the entire season before a defeat and a draw on the last two match days, finishing in fourth position five points behind the league winners. The MNZ Cup run ended early in the 2015–16 season when Radgona exited in the first round with a 6–0 defeat to Beltinci. After starting the league campaign with a defeat, the team went on to secure one of the biggest away wins in club's history, when they won 10–1 at Gančani. They lost their home derby against Slatina and after that, the club parted ways with manager Franc Hauko who finished fourth in the league after the first half of the season and then left for personal reasons. He was replaced by Nenad Dolgov on 21 November 2015. On 8 October 2015 Benjamin Krajnc became the new president of the club after the departure of Bojan Erlih.

After the appointment of a new manager, the team won the first match after the winter break on 26 March 2016 while playing in new blue and white kits for the first time. Under new management the team went on a run of nine consecutive unbeaten matches before a defeat on 29 May 2016 at home against Bogojina with the score of 2–0. With the win the visitors were confirmed champions of the league with one match day remaining where Radgona visited their rivals Slatina and drew 1–1.

The club established a reserve team in the summer of 2016. Under the management of Nenad Dolgov, the first team topped the league table after the first half of the 2016–17 season; their most notable win being a 4–1 home victory over Slatina on 15 October 2016. On 15 November 2016, Nenad Dolgov left his job as head coach of the club for personal reasons, though he stayed as head coach of the under-10 selection. He was replaced by Boris Lazić who signed a three-year contract on 8 December 2016. In the 2016–17 MNZ Cup, the team eliminated Mura Veterani, Šalovci and Grad, before being eliminated in the semi-finals by the third division side Beltinci 3–0 on 17 May 2017. On 21 May 2017, Radgona visited the league leaders Hodoš, who won the match with a goal scored in the 90th minute and were crowned champions of the league. The club finished the 2016–17 season in third place with 42 points. During the season, Radgona secured one of the biggest-ever home wins, when they defeated Ižakovci 9–0. On 6 June 2017, the club received the official invitation to participate in the Third Division for the next season after league winners Hodoš declined promotion. On 9 June 2017, the club accepted the invitation and was effectively promoted to the third tier for the second time in the club's history.

2016–17 1. MNL table (top 5 only):

Pos	Team	Pld	W	D	L	GF	GA	GD	Pts	Promotion or relegation
1	Hodoš (C)	22	16	3	3	44	24	+20	51	Declined promotion
2	Bakovci	22	14	5	3	67	22	+45	47	Declined promotion
3	Radgona (P)	22	13	3	6	55	26	+29	42	Promoted to 3. SNL – East
4	Slatina Radenci (P)	22	11	5	6	46	34	+12	38	Promoted to 3. SNL – East
5	Serdica	22	11	2	9	48	34	+14	35	

Source: MNZ Murska Sobota (in Slovene)
(C) Champions; (P) Promoted

The team started the 2017–18 season aiming to avoid relegation back to the fourth division. They started with an away defeat to title contenders Beltinci. An away win in Radenci against rivals Slatina were their first achieved points in the league. After a 0–7 home defeat to Grad, which marked the team's fifth consecutive defeat in the league, the club sacked manager Boris Lazić. He was replaced by local coach Vladimir Mauko on 31 October 2017, though this turned out to be a temporary change as Jože Sečkar was announced to be the club's new head coach on 19 January 2018. The team ended the first half of the season at the bottom of the league table with eight consecutive defeats. They also exited the MNZ Cup in the second round with a defeat to Slatina.

Under new management the team continued the season after the winter break on 24 March 2018 with a scoreless home draw against Slatina. The team went on to secure a run of five consecutive unbeaten games. Under management of Jože Sečkar the club was more successful as they obtained more points than they did in the first half of the season, including home wins over Turnišče, Čarda and Ljutomer. On 26 May the club ended the season with an away defeat to Bogojina and finished in eleventh place, though equalising their previous Third League achievement from the 2003–04 season. On 17 May, before the league had finished, the club received the license to compete in the Third Division for the 2018–19 season. Even though Radgona finished in the relegation zone, the club was spared from relegation due to an insufficient number of teams after Beltinci earned promotion to the Slovenian Second League on 6 June 2018 and Rakičan failing to obtain the license for the following season. The league saw a total of four clubs get relegated due to the number of teams being shortened to just ten for the next season.

The 2018–19 season started with a home draw against Grad. The team ended the first half of the season bottom of the table with seven consecutive defeats. They eliminated Slatina in the first round of the MNZ Cup and went on to eliminate Puconci after a penalty shoot-out, before getting knocked out in the third round against Čarda.

The poor run continued into the second half of the season as the losing streak extended to ten matches, until the club won the first league game of the season on 30 March 2019 against Hotiza. The season concluded on 2 June 2019 with the club's highest-ever win in the third tier when they defeated Črenšovci at home with the score of 10–3; Radgona finished the season in the last, tenth place, which is, however, the club's highest finish in the Slovenian football pyramid. On 26 June 2019, the club was confirmed to compete in the third tier for the next season, despite finishing bottom of the league, as the Slovenian third division was restructured. After Jože Sečkar's departure, the club announced Boris Janžekovič as the new head coach on 30 June 2019.

The team started the 2019–20 season with nine consecutive league defeats, before finally scoring a point in a 0–0 home draw against Veržej on 2 November 2019. Undergoing two managerial changes, they finished the first half of the season bottom of the league with one point and scoring just two goals. They were also knocked out of the MNZ Cup in the second round with a defeat against Gančani. On 18 January 2020, Robert Lipič was announced as the new club president. During the winter break, the club withdrew from the competition after eleven rounds and were effectively relegated to the MNZ level (fifth tier) for the 2020–21 season.

=== New beginnings: 2020–present ===
After withdrawing from all competitions, the club started in the fifth tier for the 2020–21 season and achieved six consecutive wins before drawing 3–3 at home with Ižakovci on match day 7. Radgona was sitting top of the league before the season was halted and later suspended due to the COVID-19 pandemic in Slovenia. Despite the team finishing in first place, the season saw no clubs promoting to the fourth division. In the regional MNZ Cup, the team was eliminated in the first round by Bakovci.

In the 2021–22 season, Radgona won the 1. MNL League title, which marked their first silverware since 2007. They secured the title and promotion to the fourth tier Pomurska League on 5 June 2022 with a 3–0 win against Dokležovje with one match day remaining. The club remained undefeated at home while scoring a total of 90 goals and achieving 54 points.

2021–22 1. MNL table (top 5 only):

Pos	Team	Pld	W	D	L	GF	GA	GD	Pts
1	Radgona (C, P)	21	18	0	3	90	13	+77	54
2	Serdica	21	16	3	2	49	19	+30	51
3	Bogojina	21	14	1	6	73	27	+46	43
4	Apače	21	13	1	7	83	40	+43	40
5	Hodoš	21	12	2	7	68	38	+30	38

Source: MNZ Murska Sobota (in Slovene)
(C) Champions; (P) Promoted

The club avoided relegation in the 2022–23 season, finishing in 11th place. In the second half of the season, Radgona recorded a streak of ten games without defeat, including a 5–1 away win against rivals Radenska Slatina. Due to changes in the Slovenian Cup for the 2022–23 season, the club automatically qualified for the first round for the second time in the club's history, where they were knocked out by Veržej.

== Reserves and youth team ==
The club initially competed with its reserve team In the early 1960s, under the name Radgona II. In 2016 the club re-established a reserve team, named Radgona B, which was registered to the 2. MNL (fifth tier) for the 2016–17 season. The reserve team was mainly used to give experience to youth players ready to play on senior level.

Radgona B played its first match on 15 August 2016 in the first round of the MNZ Cup at home against a league higher side Ižakovci, where Radgona B advanced after a penalty shoot-out. In the second round they were eliminated by a Third League side Ljutomer with the score of 9–0.

The team's first ever league game was a visit to Cankova on 21 August 2016, where the hosts were awarded a 3–0 win due to Radgona B fielding an ineligible player. The reserve team finished its first season in sixth place, obtaining 15 points in 16 games. The reserve team ceased operations in the summer of 2017.

Radgona mladinci are the under-19 team of the club. Their most successful period dates back to the 2005–06 season when they competed in the Second Youth League (East), where they finished in tenth place and were relegated. During the 2015–16 and 2016–17 seasons, they reached the final of the MNZ Murska Sobota Regional Cup and lost to the under-19 team of Veržej on both occasions.

== Stadium ==
Gornja Radgona Stadium
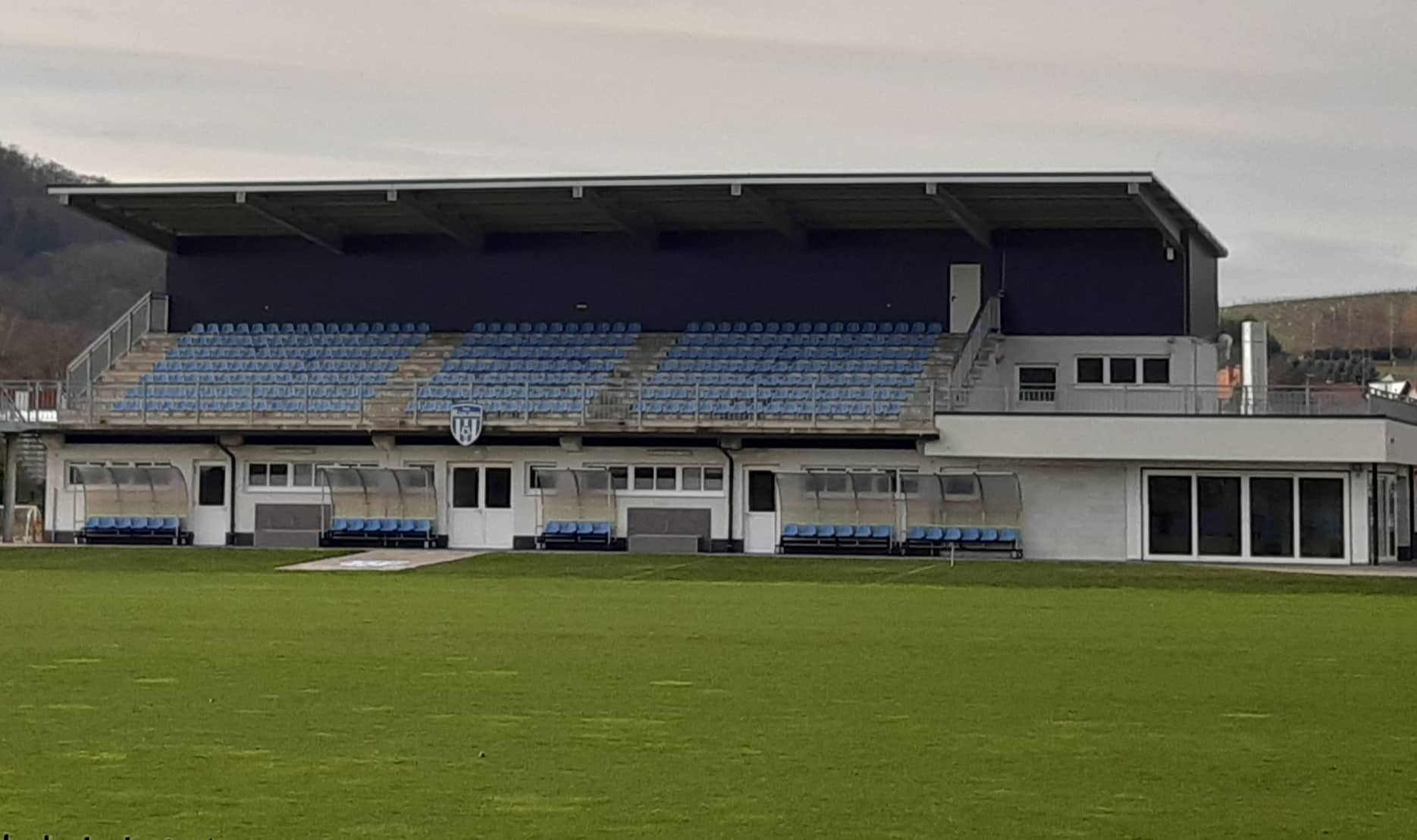
- Interactive map of Gornja Radgona Stadium
- Full name: Stadion Gornja Radgona
- Location: Gornja Radgona, Slovenia
- Coordinates: 46°40′31″N 15°59′54″E
- Owner: Municipality of Gornja Radgona
- Capacity: 301
- Record attendance: 1,000 (Radgona–Maribor, 20 June 2015)

Construction
- Built: 2013–2014
- Opened: 20 June 2015
- Cost: €712,000

Radgona played its home matches in different locations in Gornja Radgona during its history. The first home ground was near today's fairground and next to the railway tracks. The next home ground of NK Radgona was in the center of the town. Since 1976, Radgona plays its home matches at TŠC Trate (Slovene: Turistično-športni center Trate) in Gornja Radgona, where the Gornja Radgona Stadium is located. In 2010, the home pitch of the club received floodlights at the cost of €10,000. The construction of the new stands started at the beginning of the 2013–14 season.

The construction of the new stands was completed in May 2014. The stands can hold up 301 seating spectators. The first time the new stands hosted an official match was on 30 August 2014 when Radgona hosted Križevci, although the official opening of the newly build stands was on 20 June 2015 when Radgona hosted Slovenian champions Maribor in a pre-season friendly. The match had about 1,000 spectators watching from all around the ground, and is also the stadium's highest attendance. The highest attendance hosting an official match came on 29 May 2016 when Radgona hosted Bogojina, with 420 spectators in attendance.

In June 2019, the stadium received a roof.

The stadium is occasionally used as a home venue for the youth Slovenian national team selections and for the Slovenian women's national football team. In 2020, the stadium hosted three home matches of ŽNK Pomurje in the 2020–21 UEFA Women's Champions League.

=== Structure and facilities ===
The structure of the stadium is built on two main floors, the ground floor and the first floor. On the ground floor are located four changing rooms (two for the home and away teams and two for the match officials). On the first floor there is a gym dedicated to ŠNK Radgona players.

The training facilities are located at TŠC Trate and feature two full-sized grass pitches, one of which is floodlit along with two 7-a-side pitches meant for training of younger selections and a 5-a-side pitch with artificial grass which is also floodlit.

== Rivalries ==
Radgona's biggest rivalry is with Radenska Slatina against whom they contest the "Neighbourhood derby" (Slovene: Sosedski derbi). The two teams represent the towns of Gornja Radgona and Radenci. It is considered a derby due to close proximity of the two towns since there are only two villages of Mele and Šratovci between them. In the early years, Radgona did not have a main rival until 1997, when Slatina was established. Both teams spent majority of their history playing in the non-league football. As Radgona played in a different intercommunal league system at the time of Slatina's establishment, the two teams have not met in a league game until the 2002–03 season. The first official league match between the two sides was therefore played on 2 November 2002, when Radgona defeated Slatina 2–1 at home.

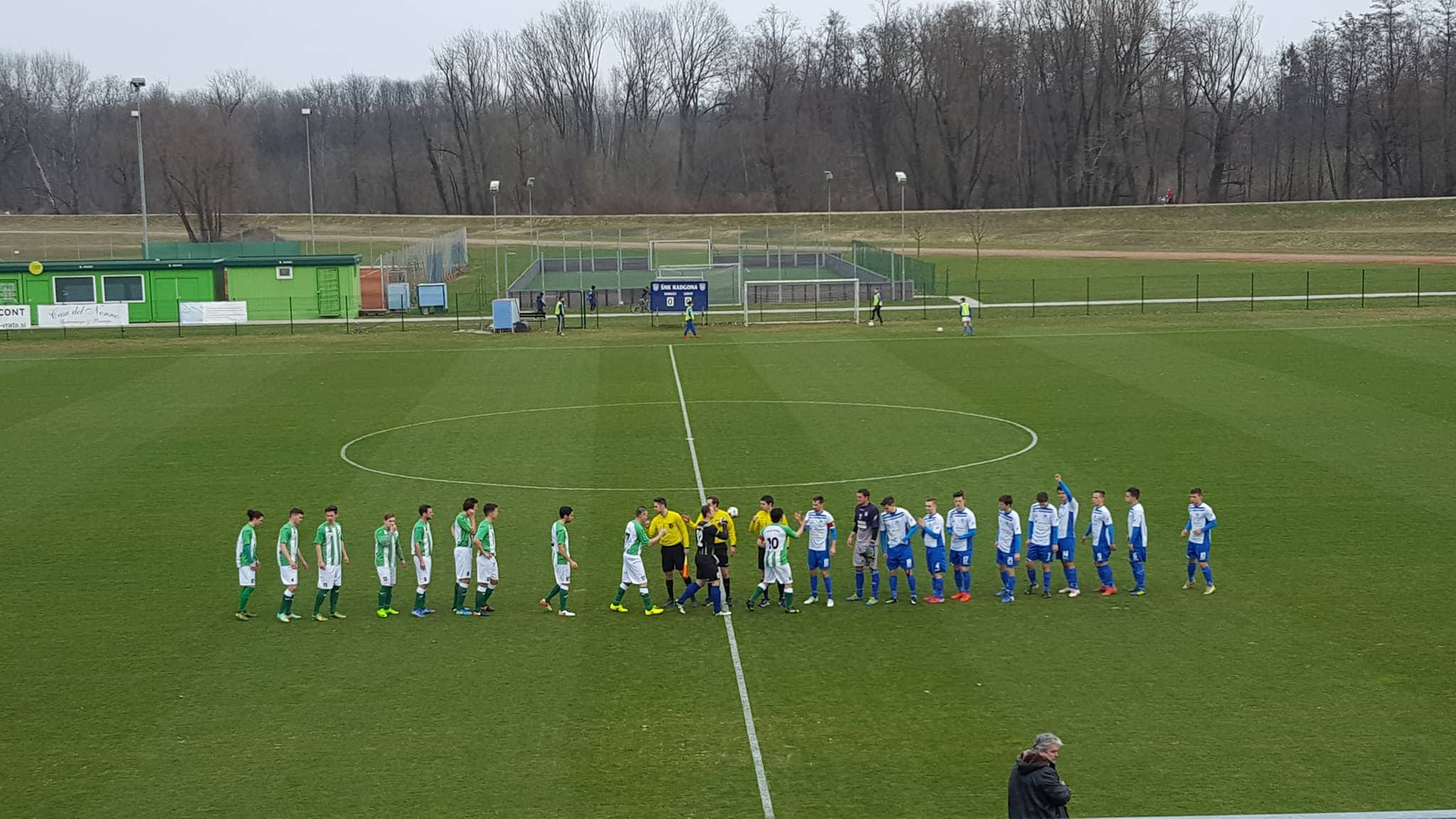
The players of Radgona and Slatina lining up before the match.

The most notable match between the two sides was on 7 June 2015 during the 2014–15 season on the final match day when Slatina needed a win to secure a promotion to the Slovenian Third League for the first time in their history. Radgona won the game 2–0 with two goals in the second half and therefore prevented Slatina from promoting to the third division. The rivalry is occasionally further intensified with Slatina's ultras group using flares during matches.

In the 2016–17 campaign, Radgona finished third in the league, four points above fourth placed Slatina. Both teams were promoted to the Slovenian Third League due to the champions and runners-up declining promotion. The first match between the two sides in the national level league occurred on 2 September 2017 during the 2017–18 Slovenian Third League season, when Radgona won in Radenci with the score of 2–1.

Radgona also has a minor rivalry with the neighboring club NK Apače from the town of Apače. The two clubs rarely meet, as Apače mostly compete in the fifth tier. Most recently, the two clubs played each other in the 2020–21 and 2021–22 seasons, when Radgona won on all three occasions. In the 1991–92 season, the two teams competed for the title in the fifth division, with Radgona finishing first and Apače second, and thus Radgona secured promotion.

== Honours ==
League

- Pomurska League (fifth level in Yugoslavia)
  - Winners: 1960–61, 1961–62
  - Runners-up: 1965–66
- Slovenian Fourth Division
  - Runners-up: 2002–03
- Slovenian Fifth Division
  - Winners: 1991–92, 1995–96, 2001–02, 2021–22
  - Runners-up: 2013–14
- Slovenian Sixth Division
  - Winners: 2006–07

Cup

- Intercommunal Football Association Cup
  - Winners: 1992

== League history since 1991 ==
Season	League	Position	Notes
1991–92	2. MNL (level 5)	1st	
1992–93	1. MNL (level 4)	6th	
1993–94	1. MNL (level 4)	3rd	
1994–95	1. MNL (level 4)	11th	
1995–96	2. MNZ Maribor (level 5)	1st	Promoted to 1. MNZ Maribor
1996–97	1. MNZ Maribor (level 4)	?	
1997–98	1. MNZ Maribor (level 4)	?	
1998–99	1. MNZ Maribor (level 4)	3rd	
1999–2000	1. MNZ Maribor (level 4)	4th	
2000–01	1. MNZ Maribor (level 4)	13th	(Note: Transferred from MNZ Maribor to MNZ Murska Sobota, and started at the bottom of the league pyramid.)
2001–02	2. MNL (level 5)	1st	Promoted to 1. MNL
2002–03	1. MNL (level 4)	2nd	Promoted to Slovenian Third League
2003–04	3. SNL – East	11th	Relegated to Pomurska League
2004–05	Pomurska League (level 4)	14th	Relegated to 1. MNL
2005–06	—N/a		Did not enter any competition
2006–07	2. MNL (level 6)	1st	Promoted to 1. MNL
2007–08	1. MNL (level 5)	7th	
2008–09	1. MNL (level 5)	8th	
2009–10	1. MNL (level 5)	12th	Relegated to 2. MNL
2010–11	2. MNL (level 6)	3rd	
2011–12	2. MNL (level 6)	3rd	(Note: 1. MNL and 2. MNL merged after the season, so they were effectively promoted to the fifth level.)
2012–13	1. MNL (level 5)	9th	(Note: Reformation of the leagues after the season (Pomurska League discontinued, 2. MNL re-established).)
2013–14	2. MNL (level 5)	2nd	Promoted to 1. MNL
2014–15	1. MNL (level 4)	5th	
2015–16	1. MNL (level 4)	4th	
2016–17	1. MNL (level 4)	3rd	Promoted to Slovenian Third League
2017–18	3. SNL – East	11th	Spared from relegation
2018–19	3. SNL – East	10th	Spared from relegation
2019–20	3. SNL – East	12th	Withdrew in the middle of the season
2020–21	1. MNL (level 5)	1st	(Note: The season was suspended due to the COVID-19 pandemic in Slovenia.)
2021–22	1. MNL (level 5)	1st	Promoted to Pomurska League
2022–23	Pomurska League (level 4)	11th	
2023–24	Pomurska League (level 4)	12th	

=== Slovenian Cup history ===
- 1992–93: First round
- 2022–23: First round
- 2023–24: Preliminary round

== Popular culture ==
A song "Moje mesto Radgona" was released by the punk rock band Brez milosti from Gornja Radgona. The title of the song translates to "My town Radgona" and has since ben adopted as the club's anthem. On 29 May 2016, on the club's 70th anniversary, the band's concert was held at the Gornja Radgona Stadium during the match against ŠD Bogojina.

== Managers ==
- (Slovenia) Aleksander Kreslin (2011)
- (Slovenia) Nenad Dolgov (2011–2012)
- (Slovenia) Robert Petrovič (2012–2015)
- (Slovenia) Franc Hauko (2015)
- (Slovenia) Nenad Dolgov (21 November 2015 – 15 November 2016)
- (Slovenia) Boris Lazić (8 December 2016 – 30 October 2017)
- (Slovenia) Vladimir Mauko (31 October 2017 – 19 January 2018)
- (Slovenia) Jože Sečkar (19 January 2018 – 27 June 2019)
- (Slovenia) Boris Janžekovič (30 June 2019 – 18 September 2019)
- (Slovenia) Robert Petrovič (2020)
- (Slovenia) Primož Rakovec (2021–2022)
- (Slovenia) Marjan Rajbar (12 April 2022 – 25 October 2022)
- (Slovenia) Željko Gaševič (25 October 2022 – 22 October 2023)
- (Slovenia) Robert Petrovič (23 October 2023 – 1 December 2023)
- (Slovenia) Jožek Oršoš (1 December 2023 – June 2024)
