= NK Šampion =

Slovenian football club

Šampion
- Full name: Nogometni klub Šampion
- Nickname: Šampioni (The Champions)
- Founded: 1995; 31 years ago
- Ground: Olimp Football Field
- President: Matjaž Zupanc
- Head coach: Igor Fenko
- League: 3. SNL – East
- 2025–26: Intercommunal League, 1st of 8 (promoted)
- Website: nksampion.si
Home colours	Away colours

Nogometni klub Šampion (English: Šampion Football Club), commonly referred to as NK Šampion or simply Šampion, is a Slovenian football club based in the city of Celje. They play in the Slovenian Third League, the third tier of Slovenian football. The club was founded in 1995.

== Honours ==
- Slovenian Fourth Division
  - Winners: 2007–08, 2025–26
- Slovenian Fifth Division
  - Winners: 2004–05
- MNZ Celje Cup
  - Winners: 2014–15, 2016–17

== League history ==
Season	League	Position
1995–2004	Didn't enter any competition	
2004–05	MNZ Celje (level 5)	1st
2005–06	Styrian League	7th
2006–07	Styrian League	8th
2007–08	Styrian League	1st
2008–09	3. SNL – East	7th
2009–10	3. SNL – East	2nd
2010–11	3. SNL – East	2nd
2011–12	2. SNL	7th
2012–13	2. SNL	7th
2013–14	2. SNL	9th
2014–15	3. SNL – North	7th
2015–16	3. SNL – North	3rd
2016–17	3. SNL – North	9th
2017–18	3. SNL – North	2nd
2018–19	3. SNL – North	6th
2019–20	3. SNL – East	6th
2020–21	3. SNL – East	7th
2021–22	3. SNL – East	7th
2022–23	3. SNL – East	9th
2023–24	3. SNL – East	8th
2024–25	3. SNL – East	14th
2025–26	MNZ Celje (level 4)	1st
2026–27	3. SNL – East	
