= NK Čarda =

Slovenian football club

Čarda
- Full name: Nogometni klub Čarda Martjanci
- Founded: 1972; 54 years ago
- Ground: ŠRC Martjanci
- President: Boštjan Cigüt
- Head coach: Leon Horvat
- League: 3. SNL – East
- 2025–26: 3. SNL – East, 4th of 14
Home colours	Away colours

Nogometni klub Čarda Martjanci (English: Čarda Martjanci Football Club), commonly referred to as NK Čarda or simply Čarda, is a Slovenian football club based in Martjanci. The club was established in 1972.

== Honours ==
- Slovenian Third League
  - Winners: 2002–03
- Pomurska League (fourth tier)
  - Winners: 2007–08, 2023–24

== League history since 1991 ==
Season	League	Position
1991–92	1. MNL (level 4)	?
1992–93	1. MNL (level 4)	3rd
1993–94	1. MNL (level 4)	7th
1994–95	1. MNL (level 4)	10th
1995–96	1. MNL (level 4)	11th
1996–97	2. MNL (level 5)	?
1997–98	1. MNL (level 4)	4th
1998–99	3. SNL – East	9th
1999–2000	3. SNL – East	6th
2000–01	3. SNL – East	4th
2001–02	3. SNL – East	4th
2002–03	3. SNL – East	1st
2003–04	3. SNL – East	12th
2004–05	Pomurska League	2nd
2005–06	Pomurska League	6th
2006–07	Pomurska League	2nd
2007–08	Pomurska League	1st
2008–09	3. SNL – East	11th
2009–10	3. SNL – East	4th
2010–11	3. SNL – East	3rd

Season	League	Position
2011–12	3. SNL – East	4th
2012–13	3. SNL – East	6th
2013–14	3. SNL – East	14th
2014–15	3. SNL – East	10th
2015–16	3. SNL – East	11th
2016–17	3. SNL – East	8th
2017–18	3. SNL – East	12th
2018–19	Pomurska League	2nd
2019–20	Pomurska League	10th
2020–21	Pomurska League	7th (Note: The season was halted in October 2020 due to the COVID-19 pandemic in Slovenia.)
2021–22	Pomurska League	4th
2022–23	Pomurska League	3rd
2023–24	Pomurska League	1st
2024–25	3. SNL – East	7th
2025–26	3. SNL – East	4th
