= NK Ljutomer =

Slovenian football club

Ljutomer
- Full name: Nogometni klub Ljutomer
- Founded: 1975; 51 years ago
- Ground: Ljutomer Sports Park
- President: Ciril Podgorelec
- Head coach: Rudi Viher
- League: 3. SNL – East
- 2025–26: 3. SNL – East, 12th of 14
- Website: nk-ljutomer.com
Home colours	Away colours

Nogometni klub Ljutomer (English: Ljutomer Football Club), commonly referred to as NK Ljutomer or simply Ljutomer, is a Slovenian football club based in the town of Ljutomer. The club was established in 1975.

== Honours ==
- Slovenian Fourth Division

Winners: 2003–04, 2021–22

== League history since 1991 ==
Season	League	Position
1991–92	Pomurska League (level 3)	3rd
1992–93	1. MNL (level 4)	2nd
1993–94	1. MNL (level 4)	5th
1994–95	1. MNL (level 4)	9th
1995–96	1. MNL (level 4)	6th
1996–97	1. MNL (level 4)	6th
1997–98	1. MNL (level 4)	10th
1998–99	1. MNL (level 4)	6th
1999–2000	1. MNL (level 4)	9th
2000–01	1. MNL (level 4)	12th
2001–02	2. MNL (level 5)	6th
2002–03	2. MNL (level 5)	2nd (Note: Won promotion to 1. MNL and merged with Cven.)
2003–04	1. MNL (level 4)	1st (Note: Lost promotion play-off for Slovenian Third League.)
2004–05	Pomurska League (level 4)	13th
2005–06	1. MNL (level 5)	9th
2006–07	1. MNL (level 5)	11th
2007–08	1. MNL (level 5)	8th
2008–09	1. MNL (level 5)	2nd

Season	League	Position
2009–10	1. MNL (level 5)	2nd
2010–11	Pomurska League (level 4)	5th
2011–12	Pomurska League (level 4)	2nd
2012–13	3. SNL – East	7th
2013–14	3. SNL – East	8th
2014–15	3. SNL – East	5th
2015–16	3. SNL – East	6th
2016–17	3. SNL – East	5th
2017–18	3. SNL – East	4th
2018–19	3. SNL – East	4th
2019–20	3. SNL – East	8th
2020–21	Pomurska League (level 4)	3rd (Note: The season was halted in October 2020 due to the COVID-19 pandemic in Slovenia.)
2021–22	Pomurska League (level 4)	1st
2022–23	3. SNL – East	10th
2023–24	3. SNL – East	11th
2024–25	3. SNL – East	6th
2025–26	3. SNL – East	12th
