= Slovenian Third League =

Third tier of the Slovenian football system

- Organising body: Football Association of Slovenia
- Founded: 1992; 34 years ago
- Country: Slovenia
- Divisions: 2
- Number of clubs: 28
- Level on pyramid: 3
- Promotion to: Slovenian Second League
- Relegation to: Regional Leagues or Intercommunal Leagues
- Current champions: Videm (East); Vrhnika (West) (2025–26)
- Most championships: Dravinja (4 titles)
- Website: nzs.si

The Slovenian Third Football League (Slovene: Tretja slovenska nogometna liga or commonly 3. SNL) is the third tier of the Slovenian football system. Since 2019, the league consists of two regional groups (East and West). They are operated by the Intercommunal Football Associations.

== Format and rules ==
Between 1992–93 and 1997–98, the Slovenian Third League was divided into two regional groups (East and West), with both group winners directly promoting to the Slovenian Second League (except in the 1994–95 season, when the top two divisions got reorganized).

In the 1998–99 season, the league was expanded to four regional groups (Centre, East, North, West). Until the 2002–03 season, all four group winners were promoted directly to the second division. In the 2003–04 season, a two-leg play-off was introduced, as only two teams advanced.

In the 2004–05 season, the format was changed back to two regional groups with both group winners promoting.

From the 2014–15 season onwards, the league was again divided into four regional groups. Three of those groups (Centre, East and North) were composed of fourteen clubs, while the West group consisted of ten clubs.

In the 2014–15 and 2015–16 seasons, the group winners played a promotional two-legged play-off to decide two promoting teams. Due to the expansion of the Slovenian Second League, the top two teams in each of the four groups were promoted in the 2016–17 season. In the following season, the group winners again played a two-legged play-off for two promotion spots.

In the 2018–19 season, the North, Centre and East groups were reduced to ten teams. After the season, the old system with two groups (East and West) with both winners promoting to the Second League was reintroduced.

== 2026–27 teams ==
East

- Čarda Martjanci
- Dobrovce
- Fužinar
- Hajdina
- Korotan Prevalje
- Limbuš Pekre
- Ljutomer
- Odranci
- Ormož
- Podvinci
- Rače
- Šampion
- Šmartno 1928
- Videm

West

- Adria
- Dob
- IB 1975 Ljubljana
- Idrija
- Izola
- Lesce
- Litija
- Rudar Trbovlje
- Svoboda Ljubljana
- Šenčur
- Škofja Loka
- Tolmin
- Vipava
- Žiri

== Winners ==
Season	East	West
1992–93	Veržej	Piran
1993–94	Drava Ptuj	Mengeš
1994–95	Šentjur	Črnuče
1995–96	Dravograd	Renče
1996–97	Aluminij	Krka
1997–98	Pohorje	Tabor Sežana

Season	Centre	East	North	West
1998–99	Livar	Črenšovci	Rogoza	Korte
1999–2000	Komenda	Renkovci	Dravinja	Brda
2000–01	Bela Krajina	Bakovci	Drava Ptuj	Renče
2001–02	Grosuplje	Križevci	Krško	Izola
2002–03	Svoboda	Čarda	Pohorje	Korte
2003–04	Factor Ježica	Nafta Lendava	Šoštanj	Korte

Season	East	West
2004–05	Zavrč	Šenčur
2005–06	Mura 05	Bonifika
2006–07	Zavrč	Krka
2007–08	MU Šentjur	Olimpija
2008–09	Dravinja	Šenčur
2009–10	Šmartno 1928	Adria
2010–11	Odranci	Radomlje
2011–12	Zavrč	Krka
2012–13	Veržej	Ankaran Hrvatini
2013–14	Dravinja	Tolmin

Season	Centre	East	North	West
2014–15	Zarica Kranj	Odranci	Maribor B	Ajdovščina Škou
2015–16	Ilirija	Beltinci	Brežice 1919	Brda
2016–17	Bravo	Nafta 1903	Maribor B	Tabor Sežana
2017–18	Bled	Beltinci	Dravograd	Bilje
2018–19	Bled	Grad	Dravograd	Koper

Season	East	West
2019–20	N/A	
2020–21	Rogaška	Ilirija 1911
2021–22	Bistrica	Brinje Grosuplje
2022–23	Dravinja	Tolmin
2023–24	Drava Ptuj	Dob
2024–25	Krško Posavje	Dob
2025–26	Videm	Vrhnika

== Notes ==
1. Korte declined promotion; their place was taken by the second-placed Tabor Sežana.
2. Čarda and Pohorje declined promotion (no replacement taken).
3. Play-off: Korte – Factor Ježica 4–0, 0–4 (1–4 pen.); Factor Ježica promoted.
4. Play-off: Šoštanj – Nafta Lendava 0–0, 2–0; Šoštanj denied licence, Nafta Lendava promoted.
5. Zavrč declined promotion (no replacement taken).
6. Adria declined promotion; their place was taken by the second-placed Dob.
7. Odranci declined promotion; their place was taken by the second-placed Šampion.
8. Play-off: Ajdovščina Škou vs. Zarica Kranj 1–1, 1–3; Zarica Kranj promoted.
9. Maribor B was ineligible for promotion; second-placed Drava Ptuj played the play-off.
10. Play-off: Drava Ptuj vs. Odranci 2–0, 1–2; Drava Ptuj promoted.
11. Play-off: Ilirija vs. Brežice 1919 0–4, 2–0; Brežice promoted.
12. Play-off: Brda vs. Beltinci 0–0, 2–1; Brda promoted.
13. Maribor B declined promotion; their place was taken by the third-placed Fužinar.
14. Play-off: Beltinci vs. Bled 1–1, 1–0; Beltinci promoted.
15. Play-off: Bilje vs. Dravograd 2–1, 0–0; Bilje promoted.
16. Play-off: Dravograd vs. Bled 2–1, 0–0; Dravograd promoted.
17. Play-off: Koper vs. Grad 4–0, 4–0; Koper promoted.
18. The season was not completed due to the COVID-19 pandemic. Šmartno 1928 (East) and Primorje (West), who were in first place before the competition was interrupted, were promoted.
19. Dob declined promotion; their place was taken by the second-placed Slovan.
20. Dob declined promotion; their place was taken by the second-placed Jesenice.
21. Videm declined promotion; their place was taken by the second-placed Brežice 1919.
