= Football 7-a-side classification =

Disability football classification

Football 7-a-side classification is the classification system governing Football 7-a-side. The classifications are governed by the Cerebral Palsy International Sports and Recreation Association (CP-ISRA).

== Governance ==
The rules for this sport and approval for classification are governed by the Cerebral Palsy International Sports and Recreation Association (CP-ISRA). In 1983, the rules for this sport and approval for classification was done by the Federation Internationale de Football Association.

== Eligibility ==
As of 2012, people with physical disabilities, primarily competitors with cerebral palsy, are eligible to compete in this sport. The sport is only open to men at the Paralympic Games. In 1983, Cerebral Palsy-International Sports and Recreation Association (CP-ISRA) set the eligibility rules for classification for this sport. They defined cerebral palsy as a non-progressive brain legion that results in impairment. People with cerebral palsy or non-progressive brain damage were eligible for classification by them. The organisation also dealt with classification for people with similar impairments. For their classification system, people with spina bifida were not eligible unless they had medical evidence of loco-motor dysfunction. People with cerebral palsy and epilepsy were eligible provided the condition did not interfere with their ability to compete. People who had strokes were eligible for classification following medical clearance. Competitors with multiple sclerosis, muscular dystrophy and arthrogryposis were not eligible for classification by CP-ISRA, but were eligible for classification by International Sports Organisation for the Disabled for the Games of Les Autres.

== History ==
In 1983, classification for cerebral palsy competitors in this sport was done by the Cerebral Palsy-International Sports and Recreation Association. The classification used the classification system designed for track events. In 1983, there were five cerebral palsy classifications. By the early 1990s, the CP football classification had moved away from medical based system to a functional classification system. Because of issues in objectively identifying functionality that plagued the post Barcelona Games, the IPC unveiled plans to develop a new classification system in 2003. This classification system went into effect in 2007, and defined ten different disability types that were eligible to participate on the Paralympic level. It required that classification be sport specific, and served two roles. The first was that it determined eligibility to participate in the sport and that it created specific groups of sportspeople who were eligible to participate and in which class. The IPC left it up to International Federations to develop their own classification systems within this framework, with the specification that their classification systems use an evidence based approach developed through research.

== Sports ==
Cerebral palsy classes from 5 to 8 are included in this sport.

== Process ==
At the 1996 Summer Paralympics, on the spot classification required that classifiers have access to medical equipment like Snellen charts, reflex hammers, and goniometers to properly classify competitors. For Australian competitors in this sport, the sport and classification is managed the national sport federation with support from the Australian Paralympic Committee. There are three types of classification available for Australian competitors: Provisional, national and international. The first is for club level competitions, the second for state and national competitions, and the third for international competitions.

== At the Paralympic Games ==
Competitors with cerebral palsy classifications were allowed to compete at the Paralympics for the first time at the 1984 Summer Paralympics.

For the 2016 Summer Paralympics in Rio, the International Paralympic Committee had a zero classification at the Games policy. This policy was put into place in 2014, with the goal of avoiding last minute changes in classes that would negatively impact athlete training preparations. All competitors needed to be internationally classified with their classification status confirmed prior to the Games, with exceptions to this policy being dealt with on a case-by-case basis. In case there was a need for classification or reclassification at the Games despite best efforts otherwise, football 7-a-side classification was scheduled for September 3 and September 4 at Deodoro stadium. For sportspeople with physical or intellectual disabilities going through classification or reclassification in Rio, their in competition observation event is their first appearance in competition at the Games.^{[33]}

== Future ==
Going forward, disability sport's major classification body, the International Paralympic Committee, is working on improving classification to be more of an evidence-based system as opposed to a performance-based system so as not to punish elite athletes whose performance makes them appear in a higher class alongside competitors who train less.
