= Željko Tomić =

Croatian footballer

Personal information
- Full name: Željko Tomić
- Date of birth: 21 December 1985 (age 40)
- Place of birth: Rijeka, Croatia
- Height: 1.78 m (5 ft 10 in)
- Position: Midfielder

Team information
- Current team: Vinodol

Youth career
- Pomorac

Senior career*
Years	Team	Apps	(Gls)
2004–2005	Vinodol		
2005–2007	Orijent		
2007–2010	Pomorac	77	(5)
2010–2011	Primorje	17	(2)
2011	Krk	17	(6)
2012	Rijeka	2	(0)
2012–2014	Skënderbeu Korçë	42	(7)
2015	Vinogradar	6	(0)
2015–2017	Naprijed Hreljin	29	(13)
2017	Lošinj	8	(0)
2017	Nehaj		
2017–2020	Koper		
2020–	Vinodol		
- * Club domestic league appearances and goals as of 30 August 2017

Željko Tomić (born 21 December 1985 in Rijeka) is a Croatian footballer who currently plays for NK Vinodol.

== Honours ==
Skënderbeu Korçë

- Albanian Superliga 2012–13

Albanian Superliga 2013–14
Albanian Supercup 2013
