= NK Dravograd =

Slovenian football club

Dravograd
- Full name: Nogometni klub Dravograd
- Founded: 1948; 78 years ago (as NK Turbina)
- Ground: Dravograd Sports Centre
- Capacity: 1,918
- President: Nejc Pečnik
- Head coach: Borut Pušnik
- League: 1. MNZ Maribor
- 2025–26: 2. MNZ Maribor, 1st of 12 (promoted)
- Website: nkdravograd.com
Home colours	Away colours

Nogometni klub Dravograd or simply NK Dravograd is a Slovenian football club based in the town of Dravograd that competes in the 1. MNZ Maribor League, the fourth tier of the Slovenian football league system. The club was founded in 1948.

== Honours ==
- Slovenian Second League

Winners: 1998–99, 2001–02

- Slovenian Third League

Winners: 1995–96, 2017–18, 2018–19

- 2. MNZ Maribor League (fifth tier)

Winners: 2025–26
