= Brod (Šentvid District) =

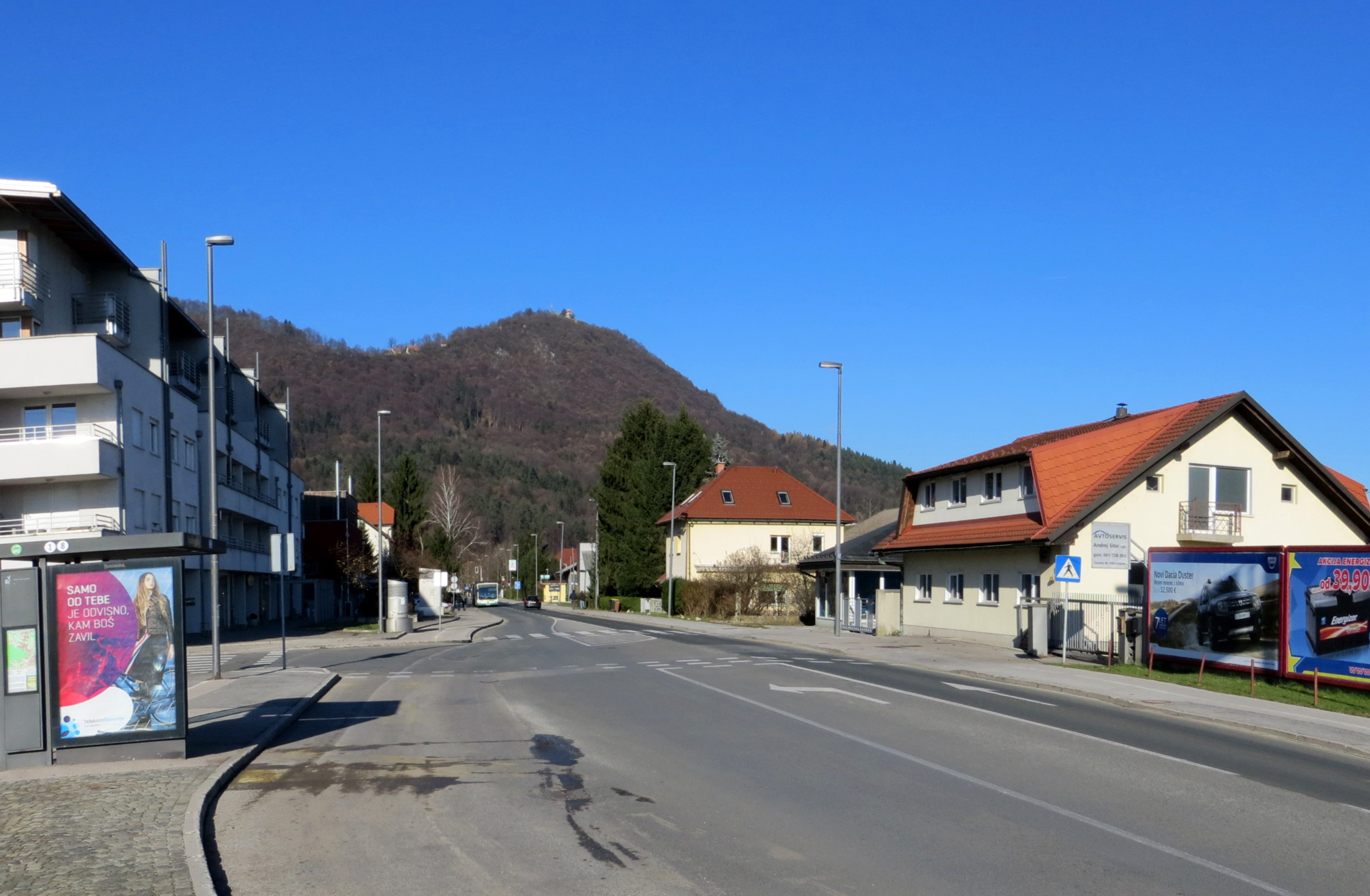

- Location in Slovenia
- Coordinates: 46°7′43.38″N 14°30′48.37″E
- Country: Slovenia
- Traditional region: Upper Carniola
- Statistical region: Central Slovenia
- Municipality: Ljubljana
- Elevation: 300 m (980 ft)

Brod (pronounced [ˈbɾoːt]) is a formerly independent settlement in the northern part of the capital Ljubljana in central Slovenia. It is part of the traditional region of Upper Carniola and is now included with the rest of the municipality in the Central Slovenia Statistical Region.

== Geography ==
Brod lies on the right bank of the Sava River on either side of the road leading north from Vižmarje toward Tacen. Fields lie to the northwest toward Medno, where the soil is better, and to the southeast toward Ježica, where the soil is poorer.

== Name ==
The name Brod is derived from the Slovene common noun brod 'ferry', referring to a place where the Sava River was crossed. The ferry was built from two shallow, wide boats with a platform on top, and it operated until 1844, when a bridge was built.

== History ==
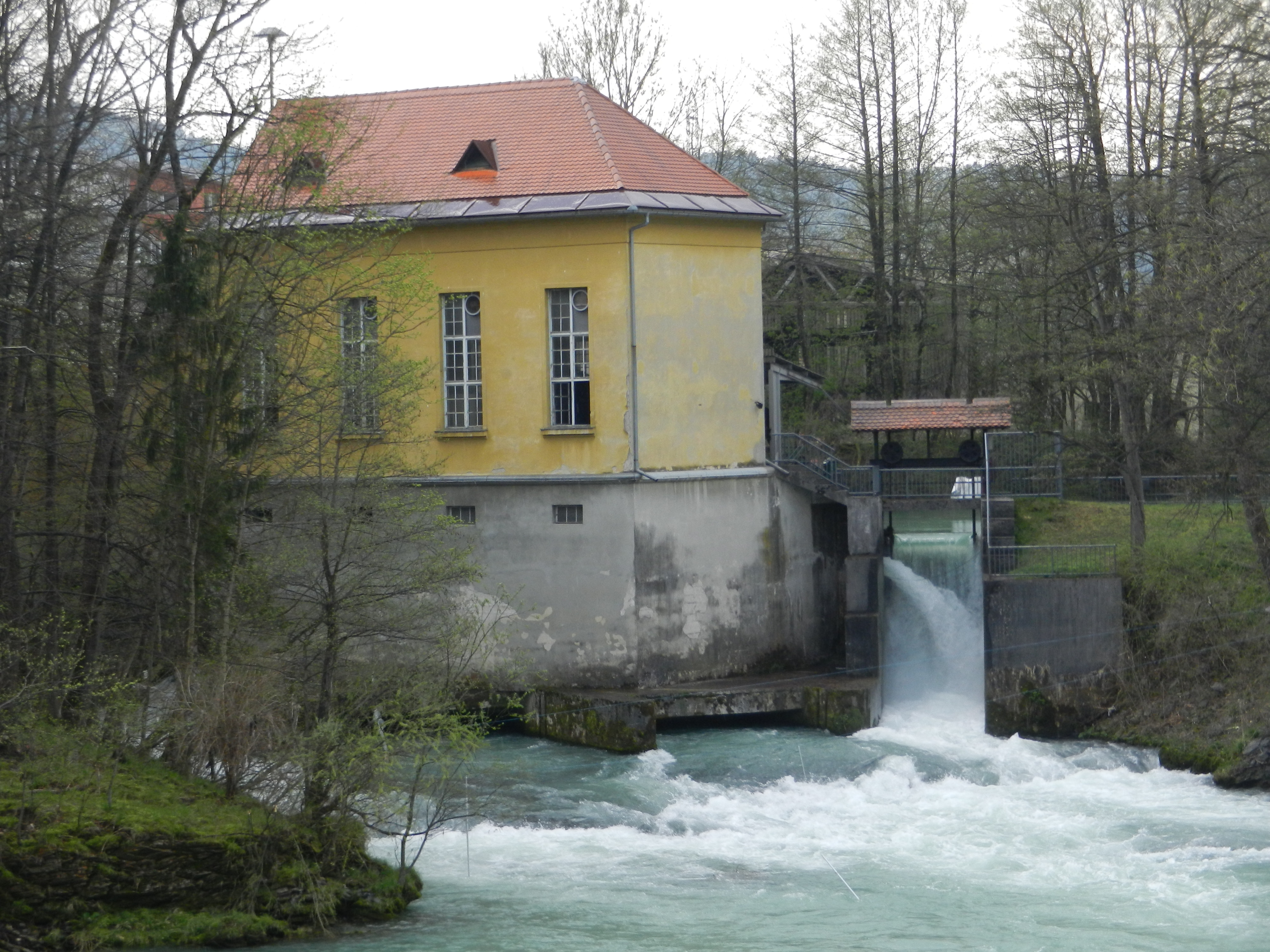
Česenj hydroelectric plant in Brod

A wooden bridge was built across the Sava north of Brod in 1844, eliminating its function as a ford. The bridge was destroyed during high waters in 1907 and replaced by an iron bridge in 1910. Ignacij Česenj established a hydroelectric plant in Brod in 1908, which provided employment for part of the local population. Brod had only 16 houses before the Second World War, and it grew rapidly after the war. During the twentieth century many small crafts developed in Brod, including furniture-making, cooperage, automobile bodywork, electrical installation, galvanizing, stove-making, and other activities. Brod was connected to Ljubljana's water mains in 1963. Brod was annexed by the village of Šentvid in 1961, ending its existence as an independent settlement. Šentvid itself was annexed by the city of Ljubljana in 1974.

== Notable people ==
Notable people that were born or lived in Brod include:

- Anton Erjavec (1887–1910), poet
- Franja Košir (1852–1927), to whom Fran Levstik dedicated a cycle of poems
