= NK Bled =

Slovenian football club

Bled
- Full name: Nogometni klub Bled
- Founded: 1938; 88 years ago
- Ground: Bled Sports Centre
- President: Miran Vovk
- Head coach: Grujo Ristić
- League: Upper Carniolan League
- 2025–26: Upper Carniolan League, 2nd of 13
- Website: www.nkbled.si
Home colours	Away colours

Nogometni klub Bled (English: Bled Football Club), commonly referred to as NK Bled or simply Bled, is a Slovenian football club from Bled. The club was established in 1938.

== Honours ==
- Slovenian Third League
  - Winners: 2017–18, 2018–19
- Slovenian Fourth Division
  - Winners: 1996–97, 2024–25
- Slovenian Fifth Division
  - Winners: 2010–11, 2012–13
- MNZG Kranj Cup
  - Winners: 2018–19
