= NK Korotan Prevalje (2002) =

Slovenian football club

Korotan Prevalje
- Full name: Društvo nogometna šola Prevalje
- Nickname: Plavi (The Blues)
- Founded: 2002; 24 years ago (as DNŠ Prevalje)
- Ground: Športni park Ugasle peči
- Capacity: 500
- President: Saško Taks
- Head coach: Tin Küzma
- League: 3. SNL – East
- 2025–26: 3. SNL – East, 3rd of 14
- Website: www.korotan-prevalje.si
Home colours	Away colours

Nogometni klub Korotan Prevalje (English: Korotan Prevalje Football Club) or simply NK Korotan Prevalje is a Slovenian football club based in Prevalje that competes in the Slovenian Third League, the third tier of Slovenian football. The club was established in 2002 under the name DNŠ Prevalje, after the dissolution of the predecessor club, which folded during the 2002–03 Slovenian PrvaLiga season due to high financial debt. Legally, the two clubs' track records and honours are kept separate by the Football Association of Slovenia.

== Honours ==
- Slovenian Fourth Division
  - Winners: 2015–16, 2022–23
- Slovenian Fifth Division
  - Winners: 2013–14
- Slovenian Sixth Division
  - Winners: 2007–08
- MNZ Maribor Cup
  - Winners: 2016–17, 2017–18
