= Dravograd Sports Centre =

Stadium in Dravograd, Slovenia

- Interactive map of Dravograd Sports Centre
- Full name: Športni center Dravograd
- Location: Dravograd, Slovenia
- Coordinates: 46°35′19″N 15°00′55″E
- Owner: Dravograd
- Capacity: 1,918
- Surface: Grass

Construction
- Opened: 1995
- Renovated: 1999

Tenant
- NK Dravograd

Dravograd Sports Centre (Slovene: Športni center Dravograd) is a multi-purpose stadium in Dravograd, Slovenia. It is mainly used for football matches and is the home ground of the local football club NK Dravograd. The stadium was the main venue for the Slovenia women's national football team in the UEFA Women's Euro 2009 qualifiers.

The stadium was built in 1995 and was renovated in 1999. It currently holds 2,118 spectators, 1,918 of them can be seated.

== See also ==
- List of football stadiums in Slovenia
