= NK Vipava =

Slovenian football club

Vipava
- Full name: Nogometni klub Vipava
- Nicknames: Zeleno-beli (The Green and Whites)
- Founded: 1996; 30 years ago
- Ground: Ob Beli Stadium
- President: Dominik Panič
- Head coach: Salim Duraković
- League: 3. SNL – West
- 2025–26: 3. SNL – West, 11th of 14
- Website: nkvipava.wordpress.com
Home colours	Away colours

Nogometni klub Vipava (English: Vipava Football Club) or simply NK Vipava is a Slovenian football club based in Vipava that competes in the Slovenian Third League, the third tier of Slovenian football. The club was established in 1996.

Vipava gained promotion to the third level after winning the 2014–15 Littoral League. Their home ground is Ob Beli Stadium with a capacity for 1,000 spectators (200 seats).

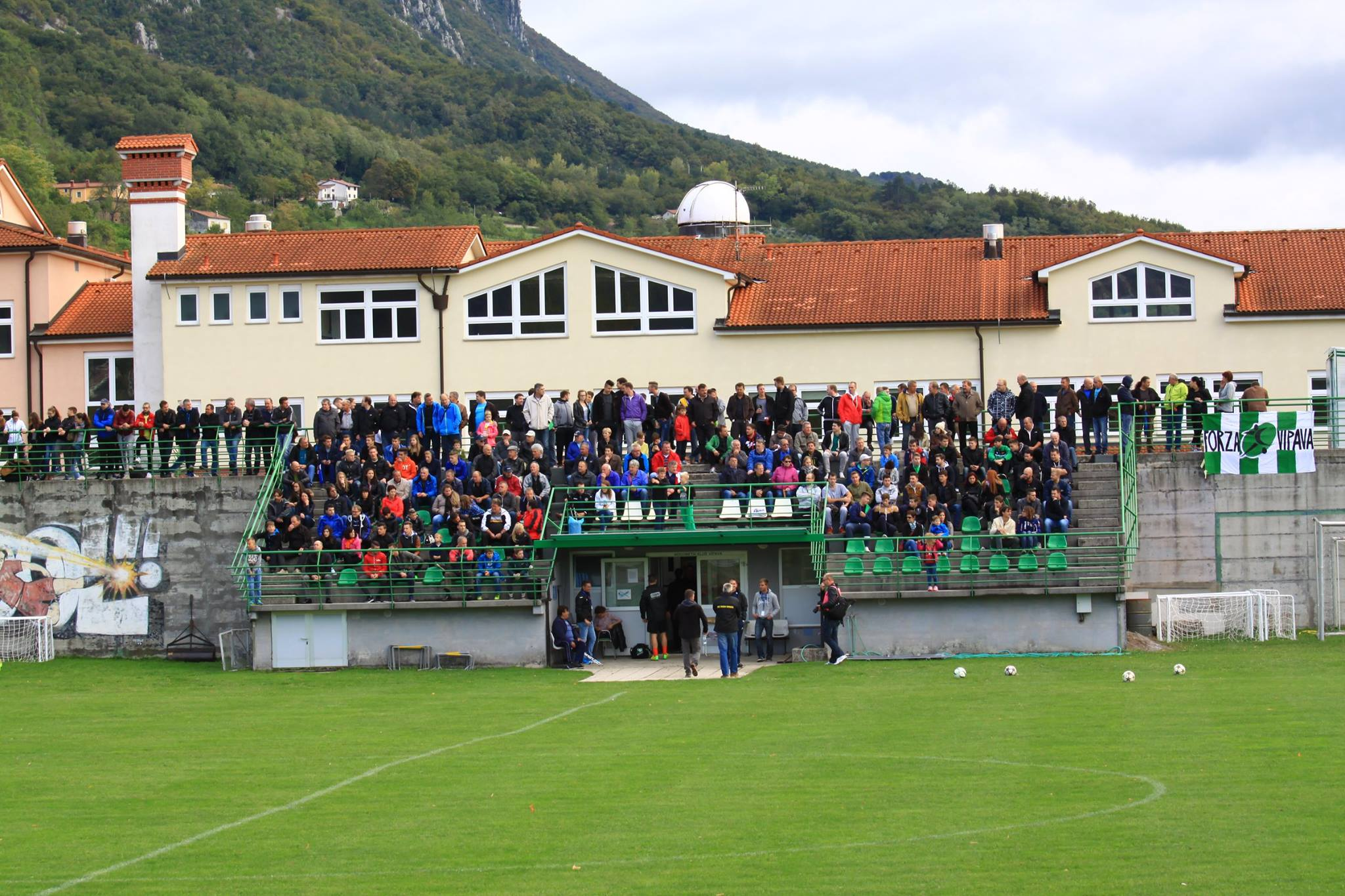
Stadium of NK Vipava

== Honours ==
- Littoral League (fourth tier)

Winners: 2014–15
