= NK Sava Kranj =

Slovenian football club

Sava Kranj
- Full name: Nogometni klub Sava Kranj
- Founded: 1933; 93 years ago
- Ground: Stražišče Sports Park
- League: Upper Carniolan League
- 2025–26: Upper Carniolan League, 1st of 13
- Website: nksava.si
Home colours	Away colours

Nogometni klub Sava Kranj (English: Sava Kranj Football Club), commonly referred to as NK Sava Kranj or simply Sava Kranj, is a Slovenian football club based in Kranj that competes in the Upper Carniolan League, the fourth tier of Slovenian football. The club was founded in 1933 and was known as NK Mladost Kranj until 1974.

== Honours ==
- Slovenian Fourth Division
  - Winners: 1997–98, 2007–08, 2011–12, 2012–13, 2025–26
- Slovenian Fifth Division
  - Winners: 2003–04

== Stadium ==
Stražišče Sports Park was built in 1954 and hosted the football team from that year. A motorcycle speedway track was constructed around the pitch in 1957 and the venue staged a qualifying round of the Speedway World Championship on 31 May 1959.
