= NK Odranci =

Slovenian football club

Odranci
- Full name: Nogometni klub Odranci
- Founded: 1973; 53 years ago
- Ground: ŠRC Odranci
- Capacity: 270
- President: Tomaž Antolin
- Head coach: Zlatko Gabor
- League: 3. SNL – East
- 2025–26: Pomurska League, 1st of 12 (promoted)
- Website: nkodranci.si
Home colours	Away colours

Nogometni klub Odranci (English: Odranci Football Club), commonly referred to as NK Odranci or simply Odranci, is a Slovenian football club based in Odranci. The club was established in 1973.

== Honours ==
- Slovenian Third League
  - Winners: 2010–11, 2014–15
- Pomurska League (fourth tier)
  - Winners: 2004–05, 2005–06, 2024–25, 2025–26
