= Football in Slovenia =

- Country: Slovenia
- Governing body: Football Association of Slovenia
- National team: men's national team
- First played: 1991; 35 years ago

National competitions
- Slovenian Cup

Club competitions
- Slovenian PrvaLiga; Slovenian Second League; Slovenian Third League

International competitions
- Champions League; Europa League; Conference League; FIFA World Cup (national team); European Championship (national team); UEFA Nations League (national team)

Football is the most popular sport in Slovenia and is governed by the Football Association of Slovenia (Slovene: Nogometna zveza Slovenije). Slovenia has been participating in international football as an independent country since 1991, when the country gained independence from SFR Yugoslavia. The Slovenia national football team has qualified for four major tournaments (UEFA Euro 2000, 2002 FIFA World Cup, 2010 FIFA World Cup, and UEFA Euro 2024).

The three biggest clubs in Slovenia are Maribor, Olimpija and Celje.

== History ==
=== Early history ===
Since being part of Austria-Hungary, football came to the territories that are today part of Slovenia in the late 19th century from Vienna. The first football club was founded in 1900 by the German minority in Ljubljana, the Laibacher Sportverein. They were soon followed by the Hungarian minority in Lendava (Nafta in 1903) and the German minority in Celje (Athletik SK in 1906). The game soon spread among Slovenian high school students, who formed their own teams in most of Slovenia's major cities, most notable being Hermes in Ljubljana and Jugoslavija in Gorizia. In 1911, the first Slovenian citizens football club, Ilirija, was founded in Ljubljana, followed by Slovan two years later.

=== Yugoslav period (1918–1991) ===
After the end of World War I and the creation of the Kingdom of Serbs, Croats and Slovenes, later renamed to Yugoslavia, the Yugoslav Football Association was formed, which was divided in regional subassociations. Football clubs Ilirija, Slovan and German teams from Maribor founded the Ljubljana Football Subassociation in 1920, which is the forerunner of today's Football Association of Slovenia. Ljubljana Subassociation covered the territory of Slovenia and was responsible for organizing the football activities within its territory. They formed the Slovenian national team, which played its first game against France in 1921. At club level they formed a league system with several levels which started being played in 1920. The Ljubljana Subssociation first league champions played along the champions of the other Yugoslav subassociations in the Yugoslav Championship. The most successful teams were Ilirija with twelve subassociation titles, followed by I. SSK Maribor with three titles, and Primorje, SK Ljubljana and Železničar Maribor with two each. Stanko Tavčar was the first Slovenian footballer to play for the Yugoslavia national team. Most of the competitions were suspended in 1941 due to outbreak of World War II.

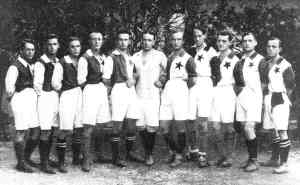
SK Ilirija squad, which won the first Slovenian regional championship in 1920.

In SFR Yugoslavia, the majority of Slovenian clubs played in the Yugoslav football league system, while the Slovenian national team continued playing as a regional amateur selection. The first post-war champions, Nafta, competed in the Yugoslav top division in the 1946–47 season, an achievement that was later repeated only by Olimpija and Maribor. Olimpija was the most successful Slovenian team in the period; they played 22 seasons in the Yugoslav top flight, reached the Yugoslav Cup final in 1970, and also competed in European competitions on three occasions. Most Slovenian clubs usually played in the third-tier Slovenian Republic League, where the most successful teams were Maribor and Ljubljana with five titles each. During the 1945–1990 period, only a handful of Slovenian players managed to get into the Yugoslavia national team, with Branko Oblak, Srečko Katanec and Danilo Popivoda being the famous three.

=== Modern (1991–present) ===
After Slovenia's independence in 1991, national league and cup competitions were formed on the basis of the old republic structures, with the first Slovenian PrvaLiga season therefore including 21 teams. In the same year, SR Slovenia regional selection reformed as the Slovenian national football team and played their first official match in 1992 against Estonia.

== League system ==
Level	Division								
1	Slovenian PrvaLiga; 10 clubs – 1 or 2 relegations								
2	Slovenian Second League; 16 clubs – 1 or 2 promotions, 2 relegations								
3	Slovenian Third League								
3	West; 14 clubs – 1 promotion				East; 14 clubs – 1 promotion				
Slovenian Intercommunal Leagues
4	MNZ Koper	MNZ Nova Gorica	MNZG-Kranj	MNZ Ljubljana	MNZ Celje	MNZ Maribor	MNZ Ptuj	MNZ Lendava	MNZ Murska Sobota
4	Littoral League		Upper Carniola League	Ljubljana Regional League	Intercommunal League	1. MNZ League	Super League	Pomurska League	
5	N/A			MNZ League	N/A	2. MNZ League	1. Class	MNL Lendava	1. MNL
