= 2022–23 Slovenian Football Cup =

Tournament details
- Country: Slovenia
- Teams: 186

Final positions
- Champions: Olimpija Ljubljana (4th title)
- Runners-up: Maribor

The 2022–23 Slovenian Football Cup was the 32nd edition of the football knockout competition in Slovenia. The tournament began in August 2022 and ended on 6 May 2023 with the final. This was the first edition of the cup tournament in a new format, where a total of 120 teams participated in the first round.

Koper were the defending champions after winning their fourth cup title the previous season. Olimpija Ljubljana won the cup after defeating their rivals Maribor 2–1 after extra time in the final.

The winners should have qualified for the second qualifying round of the 2023–24 UEFA Europa Conference League. However, as Olimpija already qualified for the 2023–24 UEFA Champions League through the domestic league, the place was given to Celje, the second-placed team of the 2022–23 Slovenian PrvaLiga.

== Preliminary round ==
Key: (1) = Slovenian PrvaLiga; (2) = Slovenian Second League; (3) = Slovenian Third League; (4, 5 and 6) = Slovenian Regional Leagues or Intercommunal Leagues (MNZ)

The preliminary round was organised and played within the framework of nine Intercommunal Football Associations (MNZ).

=== MNZ Celje ===
| 23 August 2022 | Krško (2) | 3–0 (w.o.) | Zreče (4) | Krško |
| 17:00 UTC+2 | | Report | | Stadium: Matija Gubec Stadium |

| 24 August 2022 | Vojnik (4) | 0–8 | Rudar Velenje (2) | Vojnik |
| 17:00 UTC+2 | | Report | Kosić 26'; Jovanović 51', 60'; Sousa Saramago 63'; Kahvedžić 72'; Vošnjak 75', 83'; Tubić 77' | Stadium: Vojnik Field; Attendance: 200; Referee: Kristijan Marković |

| 24 August 2022 | Šampion (3) | 8–0 | Ljubno ob Savinji (4) | Celje |
| 19:30 UTC+2 | Kužner 20'; Rakar 30'; Pušnik 48'; Kocijan 57', 65', 86'; Trbežnik 80'; Žužek 90' | Report | | Stadium: Olimp Stadium; Attendance: 30; Referee: Kenan Grošič |

| 30 August 2022 | Žalec (4) | 1–1 (3–1 p) | Šoštanj (4) | Žalec |
| 17:00 UTC+2 | Jahdauti 43' | Report | Mujkić 30' | Stadium: Žalec Sports Centre; Attendance: 35; Referee: Kenan Grošič |

| 31 August 2022 | Posavje Krško (3) | 3–0 | Šmartno 1928 (3) | Krško |
| 17:00 UTC+2 | Klarić 35'; Rešetič 37'; Škoberne 78' | Report | | Stadium: Matija Gubec Stadium; Attendance: 60; Referee: Gašper Lončar |

| 31 August 2022 | Laško (4) | 4–1 | Mons Claudius (4) | Laško |
| 19:00 UTC+2 | Krašovc 2', 76'; Gaberšek 26'; Blatnik 39' | Report | Asllanaj 83' | Stadium: Huda Jama Stadium; Attendance: 30; Referee: Marko Romih |

=== MNZ Gorenjske Kranj ===
Tržič 2012, Triglav Kranj, Železniki, Škofja Loka and Jesenice received a bye to the first round.

| 24 August 2022 | Šenčur (3) | 5–2 | Zarica Kranj (4) | Šenčur |
| 17:00 UTC+2 | Grašič 9', 44', 74'; Latinčič 58'; Fende 60' | Report | Robnik 75'; Ilić 87' (pen.) | Stadium: Šenčur Sports Park; Attendance: 120; Referee: Dejan Bavrlić |

| 24 August 2022 | Bled-Bohinj (4) | 0–1 | Visoko (3) | Bled |
| 17:30 UTC+2 | | Report | Jamšek 68' | Stadium: Bledec Sports Park; Attendance: 100; Referee: Jan Gregorc |

| 24 August 2022 | Bitnje (4) | 2–2 (2–4 p) | Kranjska Gora (4) | Bitnje |
| 17:30 UTC+2 | Djaković 18', 60' | Report | Oblak 17'; Malkoč 69' | Stadium: Bitnje Field; Attendance: 40; Referee: Just Blatnik |

| 24 August 2022 | Britof (4) | 3–2 | Naklo (4) | Britof |
| 17:30 UTC+2 | Boncelj 21'; Šenk 62'; Csipö 90+3' | Report | Cvitkovič 68' (o.g.); Terplan 90' | Stadium: Britof Field; Attendance: 80; Referee: Vanja Janković |

| 24 August 2022 | Šobec Lesce (3) | 2–1 | Sava Kranj (3) | Lesce |
| 17:30 UTC+2 | Lužar 65'; Klarić 73' | Report | Rooss 2' (o.g.) | Stadium: Igrišče na Žagi; Attendance: 100; Referee: Nejc Kajtazović |

| 24 August 2022 | Velesovo-Cerklje (4) | 4–0 | Preddvor (4) | Velesovo |
| 17:30 UTC+2 | Štern 5', 63'; Remic 67'; Knific 80' | Report | | Stadium: Velesovo Football Centre; Attendance: 50; Referee: Marko Podgoršek |

| 24 August 2022 | Polet (4) | 0–5 | Žiri (3) | Sveti Duh |
| 17:30 UTC+2 | | Report | Mehmedović 16'; Frelih 22'; Čuk 56'; Čemažar 58'; Marolt 81' | Stadium: Igrišče z UT Gorajte; Attendance: 50; Referee: Matej Kuštrin |

=== MNZ Koper ===
| 24 August 2022 | Košana (4) | 3–2 | Ilirska Bistrica (4) | Dolnja Košana |
| 17:00 UTC+2 | Brezovnik 7' (pen.), 23'; Papež 55' | Report | Tešić 51'; Agić 63' | Stadium: Igrišče na Vidmu; Attendance: 45; Referee: Haris Mušić |

| 24 August 2022 | Galeb Ankaran (4) | 0–1 | Komen (4) | Ankaran |
| 18:00 UTC+2 | | Report | Terčon 90+2' | Stadium: ŠRC Ankaran; Attendance: 50; Referee: Andrej Pirjevec |

| 24 August 2022 | Korte (4) | 2–2 (6–7 p) | Bistrc (4) | Izola |
| 18:00 UTC+2 | Memić 77' (pen.); Babič 80' | Report | Ujčič 20', 49' | Stadium: Izola City Stadium; Attendance: 50; Referee: Kristofer Franca |

=== MNZ Lendava ===
| 14 August 2022 | Hotiza (4) | 9–0 | Mostje (5) | Hotiza |
| 17:30 UTC+2 | Lőrinc 8', 84'; Kos 31', 69', 75'; Čurin 48', 58'; Donko 52'; Dominko 71' | Report | | Stadium: Hotiza Sports Park; Attendance: 60; Referee: Anton Kovač |

| 14 August 2022 | Prekmurec Dobrovnik (4) | 4–0 | Črenšovci (4) | Dobrovnik |
| 17:30 UTC+2 | Nagy 10', 65'; Zemljič 20'; Laci 35' | Report | | Stadium: Dobrovnik Field; Attendance: 95; Referee: Jožef Koren |

| 14 August 2022 | Polana (4) | 6–1 | Olimpija Dolga vas (4) | Velika Polana |
| 17:30 UTC+2 | Magdič 14'; Žalik 34', 54', 83'; Vori 36'; Gönc 86' (o.g.) | Report | Plej 29' | Stadium: PC Poljana; Attendance: 100; Referee: Miran Bukovec |

| 14 August 2022 | Odranci (4) | 3–0 (w.o.) | Kobilje (5) | Odranci |
| 17:30 UTC+2 | | Report | | Stadium: Odranci Sports Park |

=== MNZ Ljubljana ===
| 17 August 2022 | Zagorje (4) | 2–2 (6–5 p) | Brinje Grosuplje (2) | Zagorje ob Savi |
| 17:00 UTC+2 | Kosmač 44', 47' | Report | Djelovci 69' (pen.); Čož 85' | Stadium: Zagorje City Stadium; Attendance: 80; Referee: Jure Andrejka |

| 23 August 2022 | Kočevje (4) | 4–3 | Rudar Trbovlje (4) | Kočevje |
| 17:00 UTC+2 | Križ 26'; Grošić 48'; Hočevar 61'; Vesel 88' | Report | Mlinar 51'; Drnovšek 76'; Zalaznik 80' | Stadium: Gaj Stadium; Attendance: 150; Referee: Jernej Jozič |

| 23 August 2022 | Mengo 28 (4) | 2–1 | Kresnice (4) | Mengeš |
| 17:30 UTC+2 | Arh 53' (pen.); Jevšnik 89' (o.g.) | Report | Mladenovič 82' (pen.) | Stadium: Igrišče pod Gobavico; Attendance: 60; Referee: Gregor Kramer |

| 24 August 2022 | Jevnica (4) | 3–1 | Kolpa (5) | Jevnica |
| 17:30 UTC+2 | Zajc 42'; Simić 45'; Pust 86' | Report | Ribarič 90+3' | Stadium: ŠRC Jevnica; Attendance: 50; Referee: Andraž Kos |

| 24 August 2022 | Šmartno (5) | 1–3 | Kamnik (4) | Ljubljana |
| 17:30 UTC+2 | Vučković 84' | Report | Vončina 20' (o.g.); Vuk 30'; Agovič 88' | Stadium: Šmartno Sports Park; Attendance: 30; Referee: Matjaž Trobec |

| 24 August 2022 | Bela Krajina (4) | 2–3 | Krka (2) | Črnomelj |
| 17:30 UTC+2 | Mrvič 35'; Božič 75' (o.g.) | Report | Kovačič 11', 84'; Žur 36' | Stadium: ŠRC Loka; Attendance: 400; Referee: Jure Žagar |

| 24 August 2022 | Jezero Medvode (5) | 2–4 | Svoboda Ljubljana (3) | Medvode |
| 17:30 UTC+2 | Lazar 73' (pen.); Maksimović 84' | Report | Sadiković 11'; Oder 17'; Božič 26'; Lečnik Spaić 83' | Stadium: Ob Sori Stadium; Attendance: 50; Referee: Jelenko Jandrič |

| 24 August 2022 | Slovan (3) | 3–0 | Ihan (4) | Ljubljana |
| 17:30 UTC+2 | Wszola 16', 45'; Peklaj 62' | Report | | Stadium: Kodeljevo Sports Park; Attendance: 210; Referee: Žiga Kokolj |

| 24 August 2022 | Dob (2) | 4–0 | Svoboda Kisovec (4) | Dob |
| 17:30 UTC+2 | Cerar 38'; Gajič 76'; Ciglar 84'; Jakoš 88' | Report | | Stadium: Dob Sports Park; Attendance: 150; Referee: Benjamin Hostnik |

| 24 August 2022 | Termit Moravče (4) | 2–2 (3–1 p) | Vir (5) | Moravče |
| 17:30 UTC+2 | Pogačar Capuder 5'; Novak 12' | Report | Semanić 41' (pen.); Košir 68' | Stadium: Moravče Field; Attendance: 40; Referee: Gregor Kramer |

=== MNZ Maribor ===
| 23 August 2022 | Dobrovce (3) | 3–0 | Radlje (4) | Dobrovce |
| 19:00 UTC+2 | Horvat 50'; Kmetec 78'; Sagadin 83' | Report | | Stadium: Dobrovce Field; Attendance: 100; Referee: Nejc Gergič |

| 24 August 2022 | Pohorje (4) | 0–1 | MB Tabor (4) | Ruše |
| 17:00 UTC+2 | | Report | Pušnik 19' | Stadium: Ruše Field; Attendance: 100; Referee: Miha Kamplet |

| 24 August 2022 | Koroška Dravograd (3) | 2–1 | Starše (4) | Dravograd |
| 17:00 UTC+2 | Založnik 9'; Kozjak 22' | Report | Gerečnik 69' | Stadium: Dravograd Sports Centre; Attendance: 40; Referee: Urban Kresnik |

| 24 August 2022 | Jurovski Dol (4) | 4–2 | Miklavž (4) | Jurovski Dol |
| 17:00 UTC+2 | Črnčič 54' (pen.), 78'; Belna 59', 82' (pen.) | Report | Brodnjak 33'; Nikić 52' | Stadium: Jurovski Dol Sports Park; Attendance: 50; Referee: Uroš Rađević |

| 24 August 2022 | Fužinar (2) | 10–0 | Roho (4) | Ravne na Koroškem |
| 17:00 UTC+2 | Pesjak 29', 37'; Zubanović 45'; Ibrian 63'; Kotnik 66'; Offei Gyimaha 73', 75'; Posinković 77'; Vujčić 86' (pen.); Turičnik 90' | Report | | Stadium: Ravne City Stadium; Attendance: 55; Referee: Tomaž Jezeršek |

| 24 August 2022 | Malečnik (4) | 1–1 (4–2 p) | Pesnica (4) | Malečnik |
| 17:00 UTC+2 | Ulbin 90+1' | Report | Babšek 84' | Stadium: Malečnik Field; Attendance: 30; Referee: Damjan Novarlić |

| 24 August 2022 | Limbuš-Pekre (4) | 6–0 | Duplek (5) | Limbuš |
| 17:00 UTC+2 | Gligorić 2' (o.g.); Brdnik 11' (o.g.); Štorgelj 35'; Pahernik 54', 78'; Jelenc 70' | Report | | Stadium: Pod Grajskim gričem Field; Attendance: 35; Referee: Adam Bezjak |

| 24 August 2022 | Peca (4) | 0–0 (4–5 p) | Marjeta na Dravskem polju (4) | Črna na Koroškem |
| 18:00 UTC+2 | | Report | | Stadium: Peca Stadium; Attendance: 90; Referee: Jure Hrvacki |

| 24 August 2022 | Korotan Prevalje (4) | 4–0 | Rače (3) | Prevalje |
| 19:00 UTC+2 | Plesec 11'; Jezernik 17'; Kovač 40' (pen.); Oder 44' | Report | | Stadium: Športni park Ugasle peči Attendance: 100; Referee: Dejan Vivod |

=== MNZ Murska Sobota ===
| 13 August 2022 | Cankova (5) | 3–0 | Goričanka (5) | Cankova |
| 17:30 UTC+2 | Šadl 37'; Babič 79'; Hajdinjak 87' | Report | | Stadium: Cankova Field; Attendance: 40; Referee: Marjan Čontala |

| 13 August 2022 | Lipa (5) | 2–4 | Serdica (5) | Lipa |
| 17:30 UTC+2 | Balažic 4'; Sušec 81' (pen.) | Report | Ropoša 10'; Bagari 24', 64', 79' | Stadium: ŠRC Lipa; Attendance: 35; Referee: Darjan Kovačič |

| 14 August 2022 | Tišina (5) | 1–3 | Čarda Martjanci (4) | Tišina |
| 17:30 UTC+2 | Kuzma 82' | Report | Gašpar 54', 55'; Atanasov 63' | Stadium: Tišina Field; Attendance: 100; Referee: Slavko Nemet |

| 14 August 2022 | Dokležovje (5) | 0–10 | Gančani (4) | Dokležovje |
| 17:30 UTC+2 | | Report | Gregorec 5', 8', 23' (pen.); Jerič 11'; Votek 18'; Bunderla 38'; Kociper 40', 78'; Berden 57'; Titan 69' | Stadium: Dokležovje Field; Attendance: 90; Referee: Marjan Čontala |

| 14 August 2022 | Tromejnik (4) | 6–0 | Šalovci (5) | Kuzma |
| 17:30 UTC+2 | Korpič 28' (o.g.); Skledar 39'; Zrim 48'; Marič 53', 62'; Fašalek 84' (pen.) | Report | | Stadium: Tromejnik Field; Attendance: 150; Referee: Uroš Gašpar |

| 14 August 2022 | Križevci (5) | 4–0 | Bakovci (5) | Križevci |
| 17:30 UTC+2 | Kramberger 15', 25', 26'; Hari 51' | Report | | Stadium: Križevci Sports Centre; Attendance: 80; Referee: Gorazd Topolnik |

| 15 August 2022 | Hodoš (5) | 2–3 | Grad (4) | Grad |
| 17:00 UTC+2 | Knaus 7'; Kuronja 24' | Report | Potočnik 16'; Kerec 43'; Lanjšček 86' | Stadium: Igrišče Pod gradom Attendance: 150; Referee: Tjaša Misja |

| 15 August 2022 | Rakičan (4) | 5–1 | Ižakovci (5) | Rakičan |
| 17:00 UTC+2 | Kokol 34', 36'; Buzeti 43'; Benko 67'; Godvajs 88' | Report | Cener 66' | Stadium: Rakičan Field; Attendance: 100; Referee: Slavko Nemet |

| 24 August 2022 | Bogojina (5) | 1–2 | Radenska Slatina (4) | Bogojina |
| 17:00 UTC+2 | Černela 71' | Report | Kolar 21', 74' | Stadium: ŠRC Bogojina; Attendance: 30; Referee: Uroš Gašpar |

=== MNZ Nova Gorica ===
| 24 August 2022 | Renče (4) | 1–1 (4–5 p) | Vipava (3) | Renče |
| 17:30 UTC+2 | Černe 38' | Report | Kopatin 70' | Stadium: Renče Field; Referee: Rok Lavrenčič |

| 24 August 2022 | Tolmin (3) | 7–0 | Boreas Ajdovščina (4) | Tolmin |
| 17:30 UTC+2 | Kos 30' (pen.); Rutar 45'; Diohore 48', 53', 73'; Vidmar 71'; Kavčič 85' (pen.) | Report | | Stadium: Brajda Sports Park; Attendance: 200; Referee: Žiga Bizjak |

=== MNZ Ptuj ===
| 23 August 2022 | Markovci (4) | 0–1 | Makole (5) | Markovci |
| 17:30 UTC+2 | | Report | Pislak 29' | Stadium: Markovci Field; Attendance: 60; Referee: Blaž Bezjak |

| 24 August 2022 | Slovenja vas (6) | 0–3 (w.o.) | Apače (4) | Slovenja Vas |
| | | Report | | Stadium: Slovenja Vas Field |

| 24 August 2022 | Središče (4) | 0–1 | Tržec (5) | Središče ob Dravi |
| 17:30 UTC+2 | | Report | Pečnik 41' (pen.) | Stadium: Trate Sports Park; Attendance: 45; Referee: Boštjan Bezjak |

| 24 August 2022 | Gerečja vas (4) | 2–1 | Ormož (5) | Gerečja Vas |
| 17:30 UTC+2 | Kaisersberger 53'; Drevenšek 73' | Report | Kirič 32' | Stadium: ŠD Gerečja Vas; Attendance: 70; Referee: Niko Vuletić Majcen |

| 24 August 2022 | Rogoznica (5) | 2–2 (6–5 p) | Dornava (6) | Grajena |
| 17:30 UTC+2 | Lozinšek 13' (o.g.); Kokol 49' (pen.) | Report | Mar 46', 77' | Stadium: Grajena Sports Park; Attendance: 70; Referee: Uroš Hozyan |

| 24 August 2022 | Zgornja Polskava (6) | 1–2 | Stojnci (4) | Zgornja Polskava |
| 17:30 UTC+2 | Pernat 25' | Report | Pernek 67' (pen.); Petrovič 86' | Stadium: Igrišče ob Gradu; Attendance: 30; Referee: Teo Glažar |

| 24 August 2022 | Leskovec (6) | 0–2 | Oplotnica (6) | Zgornji Leskovec |
| 17:30 UTC+2 | | Report | Justinek 17'; Brusl 58' | Stadium: Leskovec Sports Park; Attendance: 15; Referee: Janko Golob |

| 25 August 2022 | Mladinec Lovrenc (6) | 2–1 | Podlehnik (5) | Lovrenc na Dravskem Polju |
| 17:30 UTC+2 | Travnikar 15'; Lampret 76' | Report | Jaušovec 90+1' (pen.) | Stadium: Lovrenc Sports Park; Attendance: 25; Referee: Aleš Sakelšek |

| 25 August 2022 | Hajdina (4) | 3–0 | Gorišnica (4) | Spodnja Hajdina |
| 17:30 UTC+2 | Petek 30' (pen.); Jazbec 35'; Zupanič 90' | Report | | Stadium: Spodnja Hajdina Sports Park; Attendance: 70; Referee: Blaž Bezjak |

| 25 August 2022 | Skorba (5) | 2–7 | Grajena (4) | Skorba |
| 17:30 UTC+2 | Leben 21'; Toplak 77' | Report | Tominc 13', 43', 45'; Pihler 33'; Goričan 53'; Cebek 61'; Simonič 69' | Stadium: Skorba Field; Attendance: 70; Referee: Matic Zelenik |

| 25 August 2022 | Bukovci (4) | 6–0 | Hajdoše (5) | Bukovci |
| 17:30 UTC+2 | Kitak 14'; Veršič 19'; Antolič 20', 65'; Brumen 54'; Kelenc 78' | Report | | Stadium: Bukovci Field; Attendance: 40; Referee: Blaž Prelog |

| 31 August 2022 | Pragersko (5) | 2–2 (1–3 p) | Polskava (6) | Pragersko |
| 17:30 UTC+2 | Maček 47'; Orešič 62' | Report | Kos 6'; Vindiš 77' | Stadium: Pragersko Field; Attendance: 34; Referee: Blaž Prelog |

== First round ==
A total of 120 teams competed in the first round. All teams from the 2022–23 Slovenian PrvaLiga, which did not compete in European competitions, entered in this stage.

=== MNZ Celje ===
| 13 September 2022 | Dravinja (3) | 6–0 | Žalec (4) | Slovenske Konjice |
| 16:00 UTC+2 | Hren 8'; Ramšak 15'; Rožmarič 26'; Sojč 67', 79'; Privošnik 82' | Report | | Stadium: ŠRC Dobrava; Attendance: 50; Referee: Marko Romih |

| 13 September 2022 | Krško (2) | 2–2 (5–6 p) | Šampion (3) | Krško |
| 16:00 UTC+2 | Gordić 51'; Arapović 63' | Report | Petkovič 26'; Pušnik 43' | Stadium: Matija Gubec Stadium; Attendance: 50; Referee: Kenan Grošič |

| 13 September 2022 | Mozirje (4) | 1–4 | Brežice 1919 (3) | Mozirje |
| 16:00 UTC+2 | Acman 42' | Report | Lipec 3', 26'; Ibričić 22', 43' | Stadium: Mozirje Sports Park; Attendance: 80; Referee: Nejc Molan |

| 14 September 2022 | Posavje Krško (3) | 0–4 | Rudar Velenje (2) | Krško |
| 16:00 UTC+2 | | Report | Kanceljak 12', 33'; Baruca 29'; Martinović 80' | Stadium: Matija Gubec Stadium; Attendance: 30; Referee: Anže Šepec |

| 14 September 2022 | Laško (4) | 0–9 | Celje (1) | Laško |
| 17:00 UTC+2 | | Report | Bajde 5', 11', 15', 72', 73', 76'; Matić 23'; Vuklišević 39'; Janjičić 64' | Stadium: Huda Jama Stadium; Attendance: 225; Referee: Denis Halilović |

| 21 September 2022 | Rogaška (2) | 14–0 | Šmarje pri Jelšah (4) | Rogaška Slatina |
| 16:00 UTC+2 | Anković 6', 27', 38', 74'; Gradišar 26', 33', 40'; Drobne 29', 87'; Neskič 36', 72', 80', 84'; Gobec 70' | Report | | Stadium: Rogaška Slatina Sports Centre; Attendance: 100; Referee: Blaž Kocijan |

=== MNZ Gorenjske Kranj ===
| 13 September 2022 | Šenčur (3) | 5–0 | Lesce (3) | Šenčur |
| 19:00 UTC+2 | Dakič 12', 24'; Bunić 18'; Petric 75'; Grašič 82' | Report | | Stadium: Šenčur Sports Park; Attendance: 80; Referee: Anže Jerič |

| 14 September 2022 | Tržič 2012 (4) | 0–8 | Visoko (3) | Križe |
| 16:30 UTC+2 | | Report | Fuchs 3', 11'; Kern 28' (pen.); Vrtač 62'; Krajnik 69', 77'; Šmid 71', 87' | Stadium: Križe-Tržič Football Field; Attendance: 50; Referee: Aljoša Markež |

| 14 September 2022 | Britof (4) | 2–1 | Železniki (4) | Britof |
| 16:30 UTC+2 | Tirovič 26'; Gašić 58' | Report | Soklič 30' | Stadium: Britof Field; Attendance: 50; Referee: Miha Omejc Burger |

| 14 September 2022 | Jesenice (4) | 3–0 | Kranjska Gora (4) | Jesenice |
| 16:30 UTC+2 | Živanović 6'; Ličina 20'; Djukić 62' | Report | | Stadium: Podmežakla Sports Park; Attendance: 100; Referee: Marko Podgoršek |

| 14 September 2022 | Velesovo-Cerklje (4) | 1–3 | Žiri (3) | Velesovo |
| 16:30 UTC+2 | Štern 6' | Report | Bracovič 11'; Frelih 24'; Shala 61' | Stadium: Velesovo Football Centre; Attendance: 40; Referee: Tilen Celjer |

| 28 September 2022 | Škofja Loka (3) | 0–6 | Triglav Kranj (2) | Virmaše |
| 16:00 UTC+2 | | Report | Jakupovič 8', 30', 57'; Kregar 35' (pen.); Ivetić 66'; Kopač 82' | Stadium: Gorajte Sports Park; Attendance: 100; Referee: Vanja Janković |

=== MNZ Koper ===
| 14 September 2022 | Tabor Sežana (1) | 4–0 | Jadran Dekani (2) | Sežana |
| 15:30 UTC+2 | Nikolić 1', 58'; Mahne Vatovec 11'; El Afghani 88' | Report | | Stadium: Rajko Štolfa Stadium; Attendance: 200; Referee: Mateo Tozan |

| 14 September 2022 | Bistrc (4) | 1–3 | Izola (3) | Podgrad |
| 16:00 UTC+2 | Vašl 88' | Report | Kremenović 12', 44'; Golemac 26' | Stadium: Podgrad Sports Centre; Attendance: 80; Referee: Haris Mušić |

| 14 September 2022 | Košana (4) | 0–1 | Komen (4) | Dolnja Košana |
| 17:30 UTC+2 | | Report | Terčon 84' | Stadium: Igrišče na Vidmu; Attendance: 50; Referee: Maj Šprager |

=== MNZ Lendava ===
| 14 September 2022 | Panonija Gaberje (5) | 3–2 | Graničar (5) | Kapca |
| 16:30 UTC+2 | Pavšič 24', 40'; Vida 80' | Report | Rubin 14'; Tüške 22' | Stadium: Kapca Field; Attendance: 50; Referee: Zlatko Pintarić |

| 14 September 2022 | Prekmurec Dobrovnik (4) | 1–3 | Nafta 1903 (2) | Dobrovnik |
| 16:30 UTC+2 | Laci 26' (pen.) | Report | László Fehér 2', 75'; Novinič 17' | Stadium: Dobrovnik Field; Attendance: 140; Referee: Miran Bukovec |

| 14 September 2022 | Čentiba (5) | 0–3 (w.o.) | Polana (4) | Čentiba |
| 16:30 UTC+2 | | Report | | Stadium: Čentiba-Kajzerica Field |

| 14 September 2022 | Nedelica (5) | 1–4 | Turnišče (4) | Nedelica |
| 16:30 UTC+2 | Hozjan 72' | Report | Lebar 8', 43', 62'; Škraban 15' | Stadium: Nedelica Field; Attendance: 60; Referee: Bojan Mertik |

| 15 September 2022 | Nafta veterani (5) | 0–7 | Odranci (4) | Odranci |
| 16:30 UTC+2 | | Report | Titan 32', 88'; Horvat 34'; Graj 36', 57'; Lukač 68'; Kranjec 70' | Stadium: Odranci Sports Park; Attendance: 80; Referee: Damjana Antolin |

| 15 September 2022 | Bistrica (5) | 2–5 | Hotiza (4) | Srednja Bistrica |
| 16:30 UTC+2 | Žugelj 22'; Zver 60' | Report | Polareczki 7', 77' (pen.), 80'; Toth 35', 64' | Stadium: Bistrica Field; Attendance: 75; Referee: Lukas Gregorinčič |

=== MNZ Ljubljana ===
| 13 September 2022 | Dren Vrhnika (3) | 0–2 | Litija (5) | Vrhnika |
| 16:30 UTC+2 | | Report | Kaltak 49'; Mešić 76' | Stadium: Vrhnika Sports Park; Attendance: 100; Referee: Jan Kern |

| 13 September 2022 | Krka (2) | 5–1 | Jevnica (4) | Novo Mesto |
| 17:00 UTC+2 | Žur 17', 39', 50'; Medle 78'; Mešanović 89' | Report | Simić 24' | Stadium: Portoval; Attendance: 70; Referee: Kristian Rozman |

| 14 September 2022 | Termit Moravče (4) | 1–3 | Ivančna Gorica (4) | Moravče |
| 16:30 UTC+2 | Ahmetović 7' | Report | Ivanjko 30'; Železnik 41'; Pirc Verdinek 84' | Stadium: Moravče Field; Attendance: 40; Referee: Semir Keserović |

| 14 September 2022 | Mengo 28 (4) | 1–4 | Ilirija 1911 (2) | Mengeš |
| 16:30 UTC+2 | Hotić 61' | Report | Snedic 21'; Slaviček 26'; Gutić 75'; Golob 77' | Stadium: Igrišče pod Gobavico; Attendance: 100; Referee: Žiga Kokolj |

| 14 September 2022 | Tabor 69 (4) | 0–0 (4–2 p) | Kočevje (4) | Ljubljana |
| 16:30 UTC+2 | | Report | | Stadium: Maksov Gaj; Attendance: 50; Referee: Matjaž Trobec |

| 14 September 2022 | Bravo (1) | 5–0 | Svoboda Ljubljana (3) | Ljubljana |
| 16:30 UTC+2 | Kurež 26'; Šaranić 30', 67'; Flakus Bosilj 49'; Maružin 87' | Report | | Stadium: Šiška Sports Park; Attendance: 300; Referee: Jure Andrejka |

| 14 September 2022 | Trebnje (4) | 2–3 | Zagorje (4) | Trebnje |
| 16:30 UTC+2 | Vranešič 69'; Pavlin 90+5' (pen.) | Report | Ocepek 36'; Kreštić 38'; Kosmač 56' | Stadium: Cviblje Stadium; Attendance: 50; Referee: Jernej Jozič |

| 14 September 2022 | Domžale (1) | 7–0 | Kamnik (4) | Domžale |
| 16:30 UTC+2 | Podlogar 8', 14'; Pišek 25', 83'; Barišić 41'; Kovačević 47'; Durdov 81' | Report | | Stadium: Domžale Sports Park; Attendance: 200; Referee: Gašper Kranjc |

| 14 September 2022 | Radomlje (1) | 4–0 | Dragomer (5) | Radomlje |
| 16:30 UTC+2 | Nadarević 12', 29'; Justin 34'; Pogačar 45' | Report | | Stadium: Radomlje Sports Park; Attendance: 70; Referee: Andraž Kos |

| 14 September 2022 | Ljubljana (5) | 1–0 | Slovan (3) | Ljubljana |
| 17:00 UTC+2 | Kolar 81' | Report | | Stadium: Šiška Sports Park (artificial turf field); Attendance: 75; Referee: Aleksandar Lazić |

| 20 September 2022 | Dob (2) | 3–0 | IB 1975 Ljubljana (4) | Dob |
| 16:00 UTC+2 | Gajič 7', 26'; Ciglar 60' | Report | | Stadium: Dob Sports Park; Attendance: 50; Referee: Jelenko Jandrič |

=== MNZ Maribor ===
| 14 September 2022 | Jurovski Dol (4) | 4–2 | Marjeta na Dravskem polju (4) | Jurovski Dol |
| 16:30 UTC+2 | Škrlec 17'; Belna 68'; Fanedl 73', 83' | Report | Stopinšek 60'; Knuplež 80' | Stadium: Jurovski Dol Sports Park; Attendance: 100; Referee: Matevž Sovec |

| 14 September 2022 | Akumulator (4) | 0–4 | Dobrovce (3) | Mežica |
| 16:30 UTC+2 | | Report | Bloudek 21', 53'; Filipović 58'; Sagadin 85' | Stadium: Mežica Field; Attendance: 25; Referee: Jure Hrvacki |

| 14 September 2022 | Limbuš-Pekre (4) | 3–1 | Koroška Dravograd (3) | Limbuš |
| 16:30 UTC+2 | Kušnik 13', 61' (pen.); Pahernik 72' | Report | Podlesnik 35' | Stadium: Pod Grajskim gričem Field; Attendance: 60; Referee: Miha Kamplet |

| 14 September 2022 | Korotan Prevalje (4) | 4–1 | Malečnik (4) | Prevalje |
| 18:30 UTC+2 | Kahvedžić 17'; Mori 20'; Pipuš 44'; Kovač 59' | Report | Dobaj 68' | Stadium: Športni park Ugasle peči Attendance: 150; Referee: Tomaž Jezeršek |

| 21 September 2022 | MB Tabor (4) | 0–5 | Fužinar (2) | Maribor |
| 16:30 UTC+2 | | Report | Ibrian 14', 31'; Turičnik 26'; Svržnjak 65'; Grešovnik 72' | Stadium: Tabor Sports Park; Attendance: 70; Referee: Uroš Rađević |

=== MNZ Murska Sobota ===
| 14 September 2022 | Rakičan (4) | 5–2 | Mura veterani | Rakičan |
| 16:00 UTC+2 | Gerendaj 19', 79'; Benko 45', 59' (pen.), 82' | Report | Kous 5', 29' | Stadium: Rakičan Field; Attendance: 70; Referee: Andrej Tratnjek |

| 14 September 2022 | Serdica (5) | 1–0 | Križevci (5) | Serdica |
| 16:00 UTC+2 | Kovač 10' | Report | | Stadium: Serdica Field; Attendance: 30; Referee: Uroš Gašpar |

| 14 September 2022 | Beltinci (2) | 6–0 | Kema Puconci (4) | Beltinci |
| 16:00 UTC+2 | Hari 2', 21'; Kosi 5'; Zorman 32'; Hren 61'; Čakš 69' | Report | | Stadium: Beltinci Sports Park; Attendance: 80; Referee: Slavko Nemet |

| 14 September 2022 | Cven (5) | 5–1 | Roma (5) | Cven |
| 16:00 UTC+2 | Meznarič 41'; Rošker 48'; Zadravec 53', 59', 67' | Report | Grebenar 20' | Stadium: Cven Field; Attendance: 40; Referee: Sašo Habjanič |

| 14 September 2022 | Veržej (4) | 4–2 | Radgona (4) | Veržej |
| 16:00 UTC+2 | Kepe 20'; Slokan 37'; Ozbetič 45'; Golinar 81' | Report | Grahić 34'; Trost 50' | Stadium: Čistina Stadium; Attendance: 45; Referee: Tjaša Misja |

| 14 September 2022 | Radenska Slatina (4) | 3–0 | Apače (5) | Radenci |
| 16:00 UTC+2 | Berden 70'; Šoštarec 80' (pen.); Avsec 90' | Report | | Stadium: ŠRC Slatina; Attendance: 30; Referee: Tilen Kocbek |

| 14 September 2022 | Ljutomer (3) | 1–0 | Grad (4) | Ljutomer |
| 16:00 UTC+2 | Fras 83' | Report | | Stadium: ŠRC Ljutomer; Attendance: 50; Referee: Matej Kapun |

| 14 September 2022 | Gančani (4) | 4–2 | Tromejnik (4) | Gančani |
| 16:00 UTC+2 | Berden 10', 24'; Gregorec 29'; Kociper 74' (pen.) | Report | Šuša 32'; Fašalek 52' (pen.) | Stadium: ŠRC Aluvar Gančani; Attendance: 60; Referee: Bojan Kučan |

| 14 September 2022 | Čarda Martjanci (4) | 1–0 | Cankova (5) | Martjanci |
| 16:30 UTC+2 | Atanasov 82' | Report | | Stadium: ŠRC Martjanci; Attendance: 80; Referee: Marjan Čontala |

=== MNZ Nova Gorica ===
| 14 September 2022 | Bilje (2) | 0–0 (4–5 p) | Idrija (4) | Bilje |
| 16:30 UTC+2 | | Report | | Stadium: Stadion V dolinci Attendance: 100; Referee: Rok Lavrenčič |

| 14 September 2022 | Brda (3) | 0–2 | Primorje (2) | Vipolže |
| 16:30 UTC+2 | | Report | Sagitov 70'; Proleta 74' | Stadium: Vipolže Sports Park; Attendance: 40; Referee: Alen Božič |

| 14 September 2022 | Vipava (3) | 1–1 (4–2 p) | Gorica (1) | Vipava |
| 16:30 UTC+2 | Tutuš 46' | Report | Vekić 89' | Stadium: Ob Beli Stadium; Attendance: 250; Referee: Žiga Bizjak |

| 20 September 2022 | Tolmin (3) | 1–0 | Adria (3) | Tolmin |
| 16:00 UTC+2 | Močnik 33' | Report | | Stadium: Brajda Sports Park; Attendance: 150; Referee: Žiga Bizjak |

=== MNZ Ptuj ===
| 13 September 2022 | Grajena (4) | 0–6 | Aluminij (2) | Grajena |
| 16:45 UTC+2 | | Report | Koblar 44'; Katuša 51', 56'; Bizjak 75' (pen.); Dukarić 81'; Baskera 83' | Stadium: Grajena Sports Park; Attendance: 150; Referee: Niko Vuletić Majcen |

| 13 September 2022 | Oplotnica (6) | 3–0 | Mladinec Lovrenc (6) | Oplotnica |
| 16:45 UTC+2 | Leskovar 7', 64'; Šraml 60' | Report | | Stadium: Oplotnica Field; Attendance: 30; Referee: Blaž Prelog |

| 13 September 2022 | Polskava (6) | 0–0 (5–4 p) | Rogoznica (5) | Spodnja Polskava |
| 16:45 UTC+2 | | Report | | Stadium: Spodnja Polskava Field; Attendance: 20; Referee: Aleš Sakelšek |

| 13 September 2022 | Stojnci (4) | 2–3 | Bistrica (2) | Stojnci |
| 16:45 UTC+2 | Melnjak 14'; Blažeković 49' | Report | Rozman 18'; Kapun 25'; Panić 90' | Stadium: Stojnci Field; Attendance: 60; Referee: Janko Golob |

| 14 September 2022 | Poljčane (4) | 4–4 (4–5 p) | Bukovci (4) | Poljčane |
| 16:45 UTC+2 | Tič 12'; Šket 31' (pen.); Topič 80'; Hrušman 84' | Report | Medved 28', 75', 77'; Horvat 88' | Stadium: Boč Field; Attendance: 20; Referee: Uroš Hozyan |

| 14 September 2022 | Videm (3) | 3–1 | Gerečja vas (4) | Videm pri Ptuju |
| 16:45 UTC+2 | Škrabl 4'; Kurež 66', 70' | Report | Rozman 61' | Stadium: Videm Sports Park; Attendance: 70; Referee: Teo Glažar |

| 14 September 2022 | Apače (4) | 1–0 | Drava Ptuj (3) | Apače |
| 16:45 UTC+2 | Klanjšek 42' | Report | | Stadium: Apače Sports Park; Attendance: 80; Referee: Blaž Prelog |

| 14 September 2022 | Makole (5) | 1–6 | Zavrč (3) | Majšperk |
| 16:45 UTC+2 | Koren 77' | Report | Lazar 13', 88'; Zorko 22', 31' (pen.); Kajzer 60'; Predikaka 86' | Stadium: Majšperk Sports Park; Attendance: 50; Referee: Blaž Bezjak |

| 14 September 2022 | Hajdina (4) | 1–4 | Cirkulane (3) | Spodnja Hajdina |
| 16:45 UTC+2 | Zupanič 17' | Report | Kraševec 52', 59'; Travnikar 53'; Cimerman 83' | Stadium: Spodnja Hajdina Sports Park; Attendance: 95; Referee: Matic Zelenik |

| 21 September 2022 | Tržec (5) | 1–4 | Podvinci (3) | Tržec |
| 16:30 UTC+2 | J. Emeršič 47' (pen.) | Report | Sprinčnik 19'; Pihler 50'; Orovič 77'; Svenšek 83' | Stadium: Tržec Sports Park; Attendance: 40; Referee: Iztok Milošič |

== Second round ==
64 teams competed in the second round, including 60 winners of the first round and 4 teams that represented Slovenia in European competitions.

=== MNZ Celje ===
| 28 September 2022 | Celje (1) | 5–0 | Dravinja (3) | Celje |
| 18:00 UTC+2 | Matić 12'; Vuklišević 64'; Junior Gbamble 74'; Bajde 86', 88' (pen.) | Report | | Stadium: Stadion Z'dežele; Attendance: 750; Referee: Denis Halilović |

| 12 October 2022 | Rogaška (2) | 4–2 | Šampion (3) | Rogaška Slatina |
| 16:00 UTC+2 | Lukić 11' (o.g.); Dolovski 17', 78'; Musulin 77' | Report | Moličnik 19'; Grabnar 81' | Stadium: Rogaška Slatina Sports Centre; Attendance: 50; Referee: Anže Šepec |

| 19 October 2022 | Rudar Velenje (2) | 10–0 | Brežice 1919 (3) | Velenje |
| 15:00 UTC+2 | Omladič 3', 10', 34', 40'; Borden 17'; Vošnjak 19'; Urek 28' (o.g.); Verbič 31'; Kosić 43'; Majcenovič 53' | Report | | Stadium: Ob Jezeru City Stadium; Attendance: 110; Referee: Kenan Grošič |

=== MNZ Gorenjske Kranj ===
| 12 October 2022 | Žiri (3) | 0–2 | Triglav Kranj (2) | Žiri |
| 15:30 UTC+2 | | Report | Kregar 49'; Čeh 64' | Stadium: Polje Stadium; Attendance: 150; Referee: Miha Omejc Burger |

| 12 October 2022 | Visoko (3) | 2–3 | Britof (4) | Visoko |
| 16:00 UTC+2 | Krajnik 7'; Šmid 53' (pen.) | Report | Gartner 20'; Tirovič 58' (pen.); Kotnik 80' | Stadium: Visoko Sports Park; Attendance: 70; Referee: Matej Kuštrin |

| 19 October 2022 | Jesenice (4) | 1–1 (2–4 p) | Šenčur (3) | Jesenice |
| 15:30 UTC+2 | Čamdžić 39' | Report | Grašič 22' | Stadium: Podmežakla Sports Park; Attendance: 150; Referee: Nejc Kajtazović |

=== MNZ Koper ===
| 19 October 2022 | Izola (3) | 0–2 | Koper (1) | Izola |
| 15:00 UTC+2 | | Report | Daley 37', 52' | Stadium: Izola City Stadium; Attendance: 500; Referee: Mihael Antič |

| 19 October 2022 | Tabor Sežana (1) | 9–1 | Komen (4) | Sežana |
| 16:00 UTC+2 | Ovsenek 4'; Nikolić 10', 32', 46', 85'; El Afghani 37'; Zeljković 55'; Mendes Crinacoba 88' (pen.); Štravs 90+2' | Report | Luin 75' | Stadium: Rajko Štolfa Stadium; Attendance: 250; Referee: Haris Mušić |

=== MNZ Lendava ===
| 19 October 2022 | Turnišče (4) | 0–3 (w.o.) | Odranci (4) | Turnišče |
| 15:30 UTC+2 | | Report | | Stadium: Turnišče Field |

| 19 October 2022 | Panonija Gaberje (5) | 1–4 | Hotiza (4) | Kapca |
| 15:30 UTC+2 | Lisjak 3' | Report | Čurin 55', 77'; Toth 83'; Polareczki 88' | Stadium: Kapca Field; Attendance: 120; Referee: Miran Bukovec |

| 19 October 2022 | Polana (4) | 0–2 | Nafta 1903 (2) | Velika Polana |
| 18:00 UTC+2 | | Report | Zoltán 44'; Igrec 50' | Stadium: PC Poljana; Attendance: 200; Referee: Bojan Mertik |

=== MNZ Ljubljana ===
| 18 October 2022 | Domžale (1) | 3–1 | Ilirija 1911 (2) | Domžale |
| 17:30 UTC+2 | Durdov 16'; Markuš 71'; Kovačević 74' (pen.) | Report | Škoflek 13' | Stadium: Domžale Sports Park; Attendance: 350; Referee: Rade Obrenović |

| 19 October 2022 | Radomlje (1) | 0–2 | Bravo (1) | Radomlje |
| 15:00 UTC+2 | | Report | Flakus Bosilj 61'; Kramarič 90+3' | Stadium: Radomlje Sports Park; Attendance: 200; Referee: Denis Šabanagić |

| 19 October 2022 | Krka (2) | 8–0 | Litija (5) | Novo Mesto |
| 15:00 UTC+2 | Kovačič 7', 37'; Medle 28', 41'; Prodanović 66'; Perković 69'; Kapitanović 87', 88' | Report | | Stadium: Portoval; Attendance: 120; Referee: Gregor Kramer |

| 19 October 2022 | Tabor 69 (4) | 0–3 | Dob (2) | Ljubljana |
| 15:00 UTC+2 | | Report | Černe 5'; Zenković 66', 71' | Stadium: Maksov Gaj; Attendance: 150; Referee: Tanja Subotić |

| 19 October 2022 | Olimpija Ljubljana (1) | 5–0 | Ivančna Gorica (4) | Ljubljana |
| 17:30 UTC+2 | Nukić 8', 26'; Estrada 27'; Ziljkić 44'; S. Pedro 90' | Report | | Stadium: Stožice Stadium; Attendance: 400; Referee: Jure Andrejka |

| 19 October 2022 | Ljubljana (5) | 1–1 (2–4 p) | Zagorje (4) | Ljubljana |
| 18:30 UTC+2 | Bolta 73' | Report | Kotar 43' (o.g.) | Stadium: Šiška Sports Park (artificial turf field); Attendance: 65; Referee: Žiga Kokolj |

=== MNZ Maribor ===
| 18 October 2022 | Maribor (1) | 9–0 | Limbuš-Pekre (4) | Maribor |
| 18:00 UTC+2 | Laušić 5', 33', 87', 90'; Božić 10'; Brnić 12'; Rafiu 38'; Sirk 55'; Tavares 69' | Report | | Stadium: Ljudski vrt Attendance: 1,500; Referee: Alen Borošak |

| 19 October 2022 | Fužinar (2) | 4–1 | Jurovski Dol (4) | Ravne na Koroškem |
| 15:30 UTC+2 | Maksimović 18', 49'; Posinković 21'; Offei Gyimaha 74' | Report | Satler 81' | Stadium: Ravne City Stadium; Attendance: 30; Referee: Tomaž Jezeršek |

| 19 October 2022 | Dobrovce (3) | 3–3 (6–5 p) | Korotan Prevalje (4) | Dobrovce |
| 17:30 UTC+2 | Bloudek 25', 28', 36' | Report | Mori 32'; Pipuš 40'; Kovač 78' | Stadium: Dobrovce Field; Attendance: 100; Referee: Nejc Gergič |

=== MNZ Murska Sobota ===
| 19 October 2022 | Radenska Slatina (4) | 7–0 | Rakičan (4) | Radenci |
| 15:00 UTC+2 | Šoštarec 11'; Lesjak 44', 56'; Štelcl 70'; Želodec 74'; Berden 75'; Pintarič 88' | Report | | Stadium: ŠRC Slatina; Attendance: 70; Referee: Tilen Kocbek |

| 19 October 2022 | Cven (5) | 2–0 | Veržej (4) | Cven |
| 15:00 UTC+2 | Meznarič 15'; Kosi 24' (pen.) | Report | | Stadium: Cven Field; Attendance: 70; Referee: Marjan Čontala |

| 19 October 2022 | Čarda Martjanci (4) | 2–3 | Serdica (5) | Martjanci |
| 15:00 UTC+2 | Gašpar 9', 75' | Report | Šinko 29', 32'; Bagola 50' | Stadium: ŠRC Martjanci; Attendance: 30; Referee: Slavko Nemet |

| 19 October 2022 | Gančani (4) | 1–2 | Mura (1) | Gančani |
| 15:00 UTC+2 | Bunderla 43' | Report | Daku 4'; Šroler 90+1' (pen.) | Stadium: ŠRC Aluvar Gančani; Attendance: 500; Referee: Matej Kapun |

| 20 October 2022 | Ljutomer (3) | 0–0 (7–6 p) | Beltinci (2) | Ljutomer |
| 15:00 UTC+2 | | Report | | Stadium: ŠRC Ljutomer; Attendance: 200; Referee: Slavko Nemet |

=== MNZ Nova Gorica ===
| 18 October 2022 | Primorje (2) | 3–1 | Tolmin (3) | Ajdovščina |
| 15:00 UTC+2 | Bončina 33'; Jermol 42'; Léo Príncipe 50' | Report | Perše 90+2' | Stadium: Ajdovščina City Stadium; Attendance: 110; Referee: Alen Božič |

| 19 October 2022 | Idrija (4) | 1–0 | Vipava (3) | Idrija |
| 15:00 UTC+2 | Jereb 90+2' | Report | | Stadium: Idrija City Stadium; Attendance: 200; Referee: Aleks Kodrič |

=== MNZ Ptuj ===
| 18 October 2022 | Aluminij (2) | 11–0 | Bukovci (4) | Kidričevo |
| 18:30 UTC+2 | Baskera 6', 10'; Marković 14', 16' (pen.), 21'; Medved 27'; Krajnc 48' (o.g.); Kmetec 57', 66'; Bizjak 70' (pen.), 89' | Report | | Stadium: Aluminij Sports Park; Attendance: 120; Referee: Janko Golob |

| 19 October 2022 | Zavrč (3) | 3–0 (w.o.) | Apače (4) | Zavrč |
| 16:00 UTC+2 | | Report | | Stadium: Zavrč Sports Park |

| 19 October 2022 | Cirkulane (3) | 2–0 | Polskava (6) | Cirkulane |
| 16:00 UTC+2 | Cesar 77'; Hutinski 90+3' | Report | | Stadium: Cirkulane Field; Attendance: 40; Referee: Blaž Prelog |

| 19 October 2022 | Bistrica (2) | 13–0 | Oplotnica (6) | Slovenska Bistrica |
| 16:00 UTC+2 | Bračko 3' (pen.); V. Panić 14', 17', 55', 75'; Kujović 29'; T. Panić 38', 44'; Džumhur 41'; Ferčič 52'; Martinčič 71'; Koprivc 78', 83' | Report | | Stadium: Slovenska Bistrica Sports Park; Attendance: 150; Referee: Teo Glažar |

| 19 October 2022 | Podvinci (3) | 0–2 | Videm (3) | Podvinci |
| 16:00 UTC+2 | | Report | Rogina 48' (pen.); Krajnc 59' | Stadium: Podvinci Field; Attendance: 120; Referee: Blaž Bezjak |

== Round of 32 ==
The draw for the round of 32 was held on 21 October 2022. The matches were played on 8, 9 and 10 November.

| Radenska Slatina (4) | 0–3 (w.o.) | Bistrica (2) | Radenci |
| | Report | | Stadium: ŠRC Slatina |

| 8 November 2022 | Fužinar (2) | 4–1 | Cven (5) | Ravne na Koroškem |
| 13:30 UTC+1 | Svržnjak 7'; Offei Gyimaha 9'; Maksimović 33'; Ibrian 58' | Report | Tršovec 74' | Stadium: Ravne City Stadium; Attendance: 50; Referee: Blaž Bezjak |

| 8 November 2022 | Hotiza (4) | 0–7 | Domžale (1) | Hotiza |
| 13:30 UTC+1 | | Report | Perc 7', 56'; Jakupović 18' (pen.), 27'; Barišić 20', 53'; Saitoski 87' | Stadium: Hotiza Sports Park; Attendance: 250; Referee: Damjan Novarlić |

| 8 November 2022 | Nafta 1903 (2) | 1–1 (a.e.t.) (5–4 p) | Triglav Kranj (2) | Lendava |
| 20:00 UTC+1 | Szabó 119' | Report | Kopač 111' | Stadium: Lendava Sports Park; Attendance: 100; Referee: Bojan Tkalčič |

| 9 November 2022 | Rogaška (2) | 7–0 | Odranci (4) | Rogaška Slatina |
| 13:30 UTC+1 | Neskič 32', 57'; Mihalić 38'; Musulin 50'; Drobne 71', 89'; Anković 75' | Report | | Stadium: Rogaška Slatina Sports Centre; Attendance: 90; Referee: Denis Šabanagić |

| 9 November 2022 | Idrija (4) | 1–5 | Aluminij (2) | Idrija |
| 13:30 UTC+1 | Jereb 73' | Report | Kmetec 24'; Medved 34'; Borovnik 71'; Skiba 81'; Baskera 87' | Stadium: Idrija City Stadium; Attendance: 300; Referee: Božo Kondić |

| 9 November 2022 | Primorje (2) | 8–0 | Zagorje (4) | Ajdovščina |
| 13:30 UTC+1 | Nunić 31', 57'; Bončina 41', 60'; Dobnikar 49'; Džuzdanović 72', 76'; Sagitov 81' | Report | | Stadium: Ajdovščina City Stadium; Attendance: 350; Referee: Aleksandar Matković |

| 9 November 2022 | Bravo (1) | 9–0 | Britof (4) | Ljubljana |
| 13:30 UTC+1 | Vodeb 1', 27', 49'; Pučnik 3', 25'; Maružin 7', 35'; Kurež 39'; Hribar 52' | Report | | Stadium: Šiška Sports Park; Attendance: 150; Referee: Mateo Tozan |

| 9 November 2022 | Videm (3) | 2–2 (a.e.t.) (8–7 p) | Dob (2) | Videm pri Ptuju |
| 13:30 UTC+1 | Rogina 48'; Zdovc 83' | Report | Černe 13'; Krupić 62' | Stadium: Videm Sports Park; Attendance: 300; Referee: Denis Halilović |

| 9 November 2022 | Zavrč (3) | 2–0 | Serdica (5) | Zavrč |
| 13:30 UTC+1 | Predikaka 36'; Zorko 57' | Report | | Stadium: Zavrč Sports Park; Attendance: 50; Referee: Nejc Gergič |

| 9 November 2022 | Celje (1) | 2–1 | Mura (1) | Celje |
| 17:00 UTC+1 | Popović 34'; Bizjak 51' | Report | Daku 52' | Stadium: Stadion Z'dežele; Attendance: 590; Referee: Rade Obrenović |

| 9 November 2022 | Olimpija Ljubljana (1) | 4–1 | Ljutomer (3) | Ljubljana |
| 18:00 UTC+1 | Gavrić 7'; S. Pedro 39'; Aldair 67'; Nukić 90' | Report | Panič 59' | Stadium: Stožice Stadium; Attendance: 600; Referee: Anže Jerič |

| 9 November 2022 | Maribor (1) | 3–1 | Krka (2) | Maribor |
| 20:15 UTC+1 | Božić 48'; Tolić 76'; Vipotnik 79' | Report | Žur 24' | Stadium: Ljudski vrt Attendance: 1,200; Referee: Marko Podgoršek |

| 10 November 2022 | Tabor Sežana (1) | 2–1 (a.e.t.) | Šenčur (3) | Sežana |
| 13:30 UTC+1 | Zeljković 8'; Korošec 100' | Report | Petric 12' | Stadium: Rajko Štolfa Stadium; Attendance: 200; Referee: Amel Begič |

| 10 November 2022 | Rudar Velenje (2) | 4–1 | Dobrovce (3) | Velenje |
| 17:00 UTC+1 | Omladič 3', 41'; Mezga 59'; Pejović 90+1' | Report | Polak 76' | Stadium: Ob Jezeru City Stadium; Attendance: 60; Referee: Martin Matoša |

| 10 November 2022 | Koper (1) | 6–0 | Cirkulane (3) | Koper |
| 20:00 UTC+1 | Kolobarić 13' (pen.), 69', 88'; Jašaragić 39', 55', 80' | Report | | Stadium: Bonifika Stadium; Attendance: 450; Referee: Žan Jazbec |

== Round of 16 ==
The draw for the round of 16 was held on 23 November 2022. The matches were played on 7, 8 and 9 March 2023.

| 7 March 2023 | Primorje (2) | 6–1 | Zavrč (3) | Ajdovščina |
| 14:00 UTC+1 | Bončina 20', 23', 35'; Čandić 37', 51'; Sagitov 88' | Report | Predikaka 84' | Stadium: Ajdovščina City Stadium; Attendance: 100; Referee: Mateo Tozan |

| 7 March 2023 | Celje (1) | 3–0 | Videm (3) | Celje |
| 16:00 UTC+1 | Popović 5'; Bizjak 30', 90+2' | Report | | Stadium: Stadion Z'dežele; Attendance: 450; Referee: Žan Jazbec |

| 7 March 2023 | Koper (1) | 2–0 (a.e.t.) | Domžale (1) | Koper |
| 18:00 UTC+1 | Kotnik 94', 120' | Report | | Stadium: Bonifika Stadium; Attendance: 400; Referee: Aleksandar Matković |

| 8 March 2023 | Tabor Sežana (1) | 0–1 | Rogaška (2) | Sežana |
| 14:00 UTC+1 | | Report | Marcius 74' | Stadium: Rajko Štolfa Stadium; Attendance: 150; Referee: Martin Matoša |

| 8 March 2023 | Rudar Velenje (2) | 0–4 | Maribor (1) | Velenje |
| 15:00 UTC+1 | | Report | Vipotnik 45+1', 50'; Brnić 80'; Tolić 81' | Stadium: Ob Jezeru City Stadium; Attendance: 600; Referee: Božo Kondić |

| 8 March 2023 | Aluminij (2) | 4–2 | Fužinar (2) | Kidričevo |
| 16:00 UTC+1 | Marinšek 43' (pen.); Jovan 53'; Brest 72'; Šturm 87' | Report | Cener 7'; Németh 50' | Stadium: Aluminij Sports Park; Attendance: 100; Referee: Denis Šabanagić |

| 8 March 2023 | Nafta 1903 (2) | 1–3 | Olimpija Ljubljana (1) | Lendava |
| 18:00 UTC+1 | Novinič 83' | Report | Nukić 3', 34'; Aldair 42' | Stadium: Lendava Sports Park; Attendance: 1,400; Referee: Alen Borošak |

| 9 March 2023 | Bistrica (2) | 1–0 | Bravo (1) | Slovenska Bistrica |
| 14:30 UTC+1 | Martinčič 57' | Report | | Stadium: Slovenska Bistrica Sports Park; Attendance: 300; Referee: Anže Jerič |

== Quarter-finals ==
The draw for the quarter-finals was held on 14 March 2023. The matches were played on 5 and 6 April.

| 5 April 2023 | Aluminij (2) | 1–0 | Koper (1) | Kidričevo |
| 16:00 UTC+2 | Katuša 79' | Report | | Stadium: Aluminij Sports Park; Attendance: 300; Referee: Božo Kondić |

| 5 April 2023 | Maribor (1) | 3–1 | Primorje (2) | Maribor |
| 20:15 UTC+2 | Jakupović 12'; Tolić 27'; Božić 77' | Report | Proleta 57' | Stadium: Ljudski vrt Attendance: 1,200; Referee: Denis Halilović |

| 6 April 2023 | Rogaška (2) | 0–2 | Bistrica (2) | Rogaška Slatina |
| 16:00 UTC+2 | | Report | Martinčič 33'; Kapun 36' | Stadium: Rogaška Slatina Sports Centre; Attendance: 250; Referee: Alen Borošak |

| 6 April 2023 | Olimpija Ljubljana (1) | 0–0 (a.e.t.) (6–5 p) | Celje (1) | Ljubljana |
| 20:15 UTC+2 | | Report | | Stadium: Stožice Stadium; Attendance: 1,000; Referee: Slavko Vinčić |
| | Penalties |
| | Elšnik (penalty scored); Pedro (penalty scored); Karamatić (penalty missed); Kvesić (penalty scored); Špehar (penalty scored); Estrada (penalty missed); Sualehe (penalty missed); Krefl (penalty scored); Posavec (penalty missed); Gavrić (penalty scored) | | (penalty missed) Popović; (penalty scored) Bizjak; (penalty scored) Bajde; (penalty scored) Štefulj; (penalty scored) Matko; (penalty missed) Vrbanec; (penalty missed) Zabukovnik; (penalty scored) Zec; (penalty missed) Karničnik; (penalty missed) Nemanič |

== Semi-finals ==
The draw for the semi-finals was held on 7 April 2023. The matches were played on 25 and 26 April.

| 25 April 2023 | Bistrica (2) | 1–3 | Maribor (1) | Slovenska Bistrica |
| 16:30 UTC+2 | Kukovec 46' | Report | Tolić 50'; Janežič 55' (o.g.); Antolin 72' | Stadium: Slovenska Bistrica Sports Park; Attendance: 2,000; Referee: Asmir Sagrković |

| 26 April 2023 | Olimpija Ljubljana (1) | 2–1 | Aluminij (2) | Ljubljana |
| 17:30 UTC+2 | Krefl 3'; Elšnik 19' (pen.) | Report | Marinšek 30' | Stadium: Stožice Stadium; Attendance: 1,000; Referee: Aleksandar Matković |

== Final ==
The final was held on 6 May 2023 at Stadion Z'dežele in Celje.

6 May 2023
20:30 UTC+2

| Olimpija Ljubljana | 2–1 (a.e.t.) | Maribor |
|---|---|---|
| Lasickas 103'; Elšnik 120+10' (pen.) | Report | Mitrović 113' |

Stadion Z'dežele, Celje
Attendance: 9,217
Referee: Bojan Mertik

== See also ==
- 2022–23 Slovenian PrvaLiga
