= 2025–26 Slovenian Football Cup =

Tournament details
- Country: Slovenia

Final positions
- Champions: Aluminij (1st title)
- Runners-up: Brinje Grosuplje

The 2025–26 Slovenian Football Cup was the 35th edition of the football knockout tournament in Slovenia.

Celje were the defending champions after winning their second title in the previous season. Aluminij defeated second-division side Brinje Grosuplje 1–0 in the final and won its first major trophy, having previously lost in the cup finals in 2001–02 and 2017–18.

== Preliminary round ==
=== MNZ Celje ===
Team 1	Score	Team 2
26 August 2025
Šampion	6–0	Laško
27 August 2025
Šoštanj	4–1	Mons Claudius
Brežice 1919	0–2	Rogaška
Zreče	3–0 (w/o)	Ljubno ob Savinji
28 August 2025
Šmartno 1928	0–2	Dravinja

=== MNZ Gorenjske Kranj ===
Team 1	Score	Team 2
20 August 2025
Sava Kranj	0–2	Šenčur
Zarica Kranj	0–1	Šobec Lesce
23 August 2025
Preddvor	1–1 (2–3 p)	Visoko
Kranjska Gora	0–2	Britof
Jezero Medvode	3–1	Tržič 2012
Polet	4–1	Bled
26 August 2025
Bitnje	1–4	Triglav Kranj

=== MNZ Koper ===
Team 1	Score	Team 2
13 August 2025
Jadran Hrpelje-Kozina	5–0	Proteus Postojna
Piran	1–2	Komen
Galeb Ankaran	0–5	Izola
Korte	0–3	Jadran Dekani
19 August 2025
Bistrc	0–3	Tabor Sežana

=== MNZ Lendava ===
Team 1	Score	Team 2
17 August 2025
Nafta veterani	0–10	Srednja Bistrica
Panonija	4–2	Dobrovnik
Črenšovci	3–2	Hotiza

=== MNZ Ljubljana ===
Team 1	Score	Team 2
12 August 2025
Rudar Trbovlje	1–2	Dob
13 August 2025
Zagorje	6–0	Komenda
Kresnice	0–5	Kamnik
Kolpa	4–0	Viktorija
Bela Krajina	6–0	IB 1975 Ljubljana
Kočevje	0–11	Vrhnika
Ihan	1–7	Litija
Svoboda Kisovec	0–2	Krka
Šentjernej	4–2	Vir
19 August 2025
Trebnje	0–2	Slovan
20 August 2025
Termit Moravče	4–4 (3–4 p)	Ljubljana

=== MNZ Maribor ===
Team 1	Score	Team 2
20 August 2025
Jakob	0–2	Korotan Prevalje
Pesnica	0–5	Rače
22 August 2025
Roho	2–2 (6–5 p)	Marjeta
Brunšvik	0–3	Dravograd
Lenart	1–1 (4–3 p)	Starše
23 August 2025
Rošnja-Loka	0–5	Peca
24 August 2025
Pobrežje	0–8	Miklavž
Jurovski Dol	3–0	MB Tabor

=== MNZ Murska Sobota ===
Team 1	Score	Team 2
16 August 2025
Grad	2–0	Serdica
Cankova	3–1	Puconci
Pušča	0–2	Dokležovje
Cven	3–1	Hodoš
17 August 2025
Radenska Slatina	2–5	Roma
Bogojina	2–6	Bakovci
Tromejnik	7–1	Goričanka
Gančani	3–0	Rakičan
Tišina	0–6	Apače

=== MNZ Nova Gorica ===
Team 1	Score	Team 2
9 August 2025
Tolmin	1–0	Idrija
13 August 2025
Adria	4–2	Renče

=== MNZ Ptuj ===
Team 1	Score	Team 2
19 August 2025
Hajdoše	0–4	Markovci
Dornava	1–7	Bukovci
Leskovec	3–4	Središče
Polskava	1–4	Stojnci
Cirkulane	0–6	Gorišnica
Podlehnik	1–0	Pragersko
Tržec	2–8	Boč Poljčane
20 August 2025
Slovenja vas	0–3	Grajena
Skorba	1–4	Gerečja vas
27 August 2025
Zgornja Polskava	0–9	Rogoznica

== First round ==
=== MNZ Celje ===
Team 1	Score	Team 2
9 September 2025
Žalec	0–0 (5–4 p)	Zreče
Rudar Velenje	7–1	Krško Posavje
Rogaška	0–2	Dravinja
10 September 2025
Šampion	3–1	Mozirje
Šmarje pri Jelšah	1–3	Šoštanj

=== MNZ Gorenjske Kranj ===
Team 1	Score	Team 2
3 September 2025
Železniki	2–5	Velesovo Cerklje
Jezero Medvode	0–5	Škofja Loka
Žiri	1–0	Šobec Lesce
Britof	3–3 (4–5 p)	Visoko
Šenčur	3–0	Jesenice
9 September 2025
Polet	2–12	Triglav Kranj

=== MNZ Koper ===
Team 1	Score	Team 2
27 August 2025
Košana	1–7	Jadran Dekani
Komen	3–0	Jadran Hrpelje-Kozina
Tabor Sežana	2–0	Izola

=== MNZ Lendava ===
Team 1	Score	Team 2
17 August 2025
Kobilje	0–3	Odranci
27 August 2025
Graničar	0–4	Polana
Turnišče	6–3	Hungarikum Olimpija
Čentiba	0–3 (w/o)	Nafta 1903
Črenšovci	3–4	Srednja Bistrica
28 August 2025
Panonija	2–0	Nedelica

=== MNZ Ljubljana ===
Team 1	Score	Team 2
27 August 2025
Šmartno Ljubljana	3–2	Arne Tabor 69
Jevnica	1–8	Brinje Grosuplje
Zagorje	2–2 (7–6 p)	Litija
Ivančna Gorica	1–3	Bela Krajina
Ilirija 1911	1–2	Krka
Kolpa	0–4	Radomlje
Dragomer	1–1 (6–5 p)	Vrhnika
Šentjernej	1–8	Slovan
Kamnik	2–2 (5–3 p)	Svoboda Ljubljana
3 September 2025
Bravo	9–0	Ljubljana
17 September 2025
Dob	1–2	Domžale

=== MNZ Maribor ===
Team 1	Score	Team 2
3 September 2025
Kungota	1–2	Malečnik
Roho	4–0	Miklavž
Dravograd	0–2	Dobrovce
Limbuš Pekre	0–1	Fužinar
Jurovski Dol	3–2	Lenart
Korotan Prevalje	0–3	Rače
Pohorje	1–2	Peca

=== MNZ Murska Sobota ===
Team 1	Score	Team 2
3 September 2025
Ljutomer	2–0	Čarda Martjanci
Dokležovje	1–2	Tromejnik
Gančani	1–9	Beltinci
Lipa	3–3 (5–4 p)	Križevci
Grad	1–1 (6–7 p)	Roma
Ižakovci	1–2	Cven
Apače	3–0	Cankova
4 September 2025
Bakovci	0–11	Mura

=== MNZ Nova Gorica ===
Team 1	Score	Team 2
26 August 2025
Adria	3–2	Tolmin
27 August 2025
Vodice Šempas	0–3	Vipava
Bilje	0–3	Primorje
Brda	0–4	Gorica

=== MNZ Ptuj ===
Team 1	Score	Team 2
2 September 2025
Gerečja vas	0–5	Zavrč
Središče	2–7	Podvinci
Ormož	0–1	Boč Poljčane
Grajena	2–3	Makole
Podlehnik	0–3	Videm
3 September 2025
Rogoznica	3–3 (4–5 p)	Bukovci
Stojnci	4–0	Apače (Ptuj)
Markovci	1–5	Drava Ptuj
Gorišnica	0–5	Bistrica
10 September 2025
Hajdina	0–5	Aluminij

== Second round ==
=== MNZ Celje ===
Team 1	Score	Team 2
24 September 2025
Žalec	0–6	Celje
Šampion	1–8	Rudar Velenje
Dravinja	5–2	Šoštanj

=== MNZ Gorenjske Kranj ===
Team 1	Score	Team 2
17 September 2025
Visoko	1–4	Škofja Loka
Šenčur	2–0	Triglav Kranj
24 September 2025
Velesovo Cerklje	0–1	Žiri

=== MNZ Koper ===
Team 1	Score	Team 2
17 September 2025
Komen	0–2	Jadran Dekani
Tabor Sežana	0–0 (9–8 p)	Koper

=== MNZ Lendava ===
Team 1	Score	Team 2
17 September 2025
Srednja Bistrica	0–3	Nafta 1903
Turnišče	2–5	Polana
Panonija	0–3 (w/o)	Odranci

=== MNZ Ljubljana ===
Team 1	Score	Team 2
9 September 2025
Bela Krajina	0–6	Brinje Grosuplje
Dragomer	1–5	Radomlje
17 September 2025
Šmartno Ljubljana	0–0 (3–4 p)	Kamnik
Zagorje	0–7	Krka
24 September 2025
Slovan	1–2	Bravo
Olimpija Ljubljana	1–0	Domžale

=== MNZ Maribor ===
Team 1	Score	Team 2
17 September 2025
Roho	2–2 (5–6 p)	Malečnik
Rače	4–1	Dobrovce
Peca	1–2	Fužinar
23 September 2025
Jurovski Dol	0–13	Maribor

=== MNZ Murska Sobota ===
Team 1	Score	Team 2
17 September 2025
Roma	0–8	Beltinci
Tromejnik	3–0	Lipa
Cven	0–7	Mura
Apače	1–6	Ljutomer

=== MNZ Nova Gorica ===
Team 1	Score	Team 2
17 September 2025
Adria	0–2	Vipava
Gorica	0–2	Primorje

=== MNZ Ptuj ===
Team 1	Score	Team 2
23 September 2025
Bukovci	1–7	Aluminij
24 September 2025
Stojnci	3–0 (w/o)	Drava Ptuj
Boč Poljčane	1–2	Zavrč
Makole	2–1	Podvinci
Videm	1–2	Bistrica

== Round of 32 ==
Team 1	Score	Team 2
21 October 2025
Ljutomer	0–3	Rudar Velenje
Malečnik	2–1	Kamnik
22 October 2025
Škofja Loka	1–6	Nafta 1903
Bistrica	18–0	Stojnci
Polana	1–0	Zavrč
28 October 2025
Žiri	1–6	Aluminij
Vipava	1–2	Bravo
29 October 2025
Makole	0–4	Celje
Beltinci	1–3	Radomlje
Šenčur	1–2	Olimpija Ljubljana
Tabor Sežana	1–4	Primorje
Brinje Grosuplje	1–1 (4–2 p)	Maribor
30 October 2025
Dravinja	1–2	Mura
5 November 2025
Tromejnik	0–3	Jadran Dekani
Rače	2–1	Krka
6 November 2025
Odranci	2–4 (a.e.t.)	Fužinar

== Round of 16 ==
Team 1	Score	Team 2
18 November 2025
Aluminij	7–1	Polana
19 November 2025
Jadran Dekani	2–0	Malečnik
Fužinar	5–0	Rače
27 November 2025
Brinje Grosuplje	2–1	Bistrica
3 December 2025
Radomlje	3–2	Primorje
Bravo	2–0	Rudar Velenje
Mura	1–2	Nafta 1903
4 December 2025
Olimpija Ljubljana	1–0	Celje

== Quarter-finals ==
Team 1	Score	Team 2
4 March 2026
Jadran Dekani	2–4 (a.e.t.)	Radomlje
Brinje Grosuplje	1–0	Olimpija Ljubljana
11 March 2026
Fužinar	0–4	Aluminij
12 March 2026
Bravo	2–0	Nafta 1903

== Semi-finals ==
Team 1	Score	Team 2
22 April 2026
Radomlje	0–1	Brinje Grosuplje
23 April 2026
Bravo	0–1	Aluminij

== Final ==
The final was held on 13 May 2026 at Stadion Z'dežele in Celje.

13 May 2026
20:00 UTC+2

Brinje Grosuplje	0–1	Aluminij
	Report	Susso 78'

Stadion Z'dežele, Celje
Attendance: 3,892
Referee: David Šmajc
