= 2011–12 Slovenian Third League =

Slovenian Third League
- Season: 2011–12
- Champions: Zavrč (East); Krka Novo Mesto (West)
- Promoted: Zavrč; Krka
- Relegated: Ilirska Bistrica; Jesenice; Paloma; Stojnci; Svoboda
- Matches: 364
- Goals: 1,189 (3.27 per match)
- Top goalscorer: Mitja Brulc (25 goals)

The season began on 20 August 2011 and ended on 9 June 2012.

- Ljubljana and Portorož Piran were excluded after the 2010–11 season, their places were taken by Zagorje and Izola.

== Clubs East ==
Club	Location	Stadium	2010–11 position
Bistrica	Slovenska Bistrica	Slovenska Bistrica Sports Park	11th
Čarda	Martjanci	ŠRC Martjanci	3rd
Dravograd	Dravograd	Dravograd Sports Centre	5th
Grad	Grad	Igrišče Pod gradom	7th
Kovinar Štore	Štore	Na Lipi Stadium	6th
Malečnik	Malečnik	Berl Sports Centre	9th
Odranci	Odranci	ŠRC Odranci	1st
Paloma	Sladki Vrh	Sladki Vrh Sports Park	8th
Rakičan	Rakičan	Grajski Park Stadium	1st, Pomurska
Stojnci	Stojnci	Stojnci Sports Park	10th
Tromejnik	Kuzma	Kuzma Football Stadium	4th
Veržej	Veržej	Čistina Stadium	13th
Zavrč	Zavrč	Zavrč Sports Park	1st, Styrian
Zreče	Zreče	Zreče Stadium	12th

=== League standing ===
Pos	Team	Pld	W	D	L	GF	GA	GD	Pts	Promotion or relegation
1	Zavrč (C, P)	26	23	1	2	93	23	+70	70	Promotion to Slovenian Second League
2	Dravograd	26	10	12	4	36	26	+10	42	
3	Stojnci (R)	26	12	4	10	43	42	+1	40	Withdrew
4	Čarda	26	11	6	9	45	43	+2	39	
5	Zreče	26	10	8	8	33	34	−1	38	
6	Tromejnik	26	12	2	12	42	46	−4	38	
7	Veržej	26	11	4	11	42	35	+7	37	
8	Kovinar Štore	26	10	6	10	39	40	−1	36	
9	Odranci	26	10	2	14	39	48	−9	32	
10	Grad	26	9	4	13	43	51	−8	31	
11	Malečnik	26	7	9	10	39	46	−7	30	
12	Rakičan	26	8	4	14	38	65	−27	28	
13	Bistrica	26	8	2	16	29	50	−21	26	
14	Paloma (R)	26	7	4	15	36	48	−12	25	Relegation to Slovenian Regional League

Source: MNZ Ptuj
(C) Champions; (P) Promoted; (R) Relegated

== Clubs West ==
Club	Location	Stadium	2010–11 position
Adria	Miren	Igrišče Pri Štantu	10th
Ankaran Hrvatini	Ankaran	ŠRC Katarina	8th
Brda	Dobrovo	Vipolže Stadium	11th
Ilirska Bistrica	Ilirska Bistrica	Trnovo Sports Centre	1st, Littoral
Ivančna Gorica	Ivančna Gorica	Ivančna Gorica Stadium	9th
Izola	Izola	Izola City Stadium	3rd, Littoral^{1}
Jadran	Dekani	Dekani Sports Park	2nd
Jesenice	Jesenice	Podmežakla Stadium	1st, Carniolan
Kamnik	Kamnik	Stadion Prijateljstva	3rd
Krka	Novo Mesto	Portoval	6th
Svoboda	Ljubljana	Svoboda Sports Park	1st, Ljubljana
Tolmin	Tolmin	Brajda Sports Park	4th
Zagorje	Zagorje ob Savi	Zagorje City Stadium	3rd, Ljubljana^{1}
Zarica	Kranj	Zarica Sports Park	5th

1 Korte and Bravo declined promotion.

=== League standing ===
Pos	Team	Pld	W	D	L	GF	GA	GD	Pts	Promotion or relegation
1	Krka (C, P)	26	19	1	6	77	31	+46	58	Promotion to Slovenian Second League
2	Ankaran Hrvatini	26	15	2	9	57	33	+24	47	
3	Jadran Dekani	26	13	5	8	41	32	+9	44	
4	Ivančna Gorica	26	12	4	10	44	38	+6	40	
5	Tolmin	26	12	4	10	44	41	+3	40	
6	Zagorje	26	11	6	9	36	44	−8	39	
7	Izola	26	10	6	10	45	49	−4	36	
8	Zarica Kranj	26	10	5	11	53	57	−4	35	
9	Brda	26	9	8	9	37	46	−9	35	
10	Kamnik	26	10	5	11	37	39	−2	35	
11	Adria	26	7	8	11	32	41	−9	29	
12	Ilirska Bistrica (R)	26	9	1	16	40	43	−3	28	Withdrew
13	Jesenice (R)	26	5	8	13	26	49	−23	23	Relegation to Slovenian Regional League
14	Svoboda (R)	26	5	7	14	23	49	−26	22	Relegation to Slovenian Regional League

Source: MNZ Koper
(C) Champions; (P) Promoted; (R) Relegated

== See also ==
- 2011–12 Slovenian Second League
