= 2012–13 Slovenian Third League =

Slovenian Third League
- Season: 2012–13
- Champions: Veržej (East); Ankaran Hrvatini (West)
- Promoted: Veržej; Ankaran Hrvatini
- Relegated: Dravograd; Zreče; Kovinar Štore; Bilje
- Matches: 338
- Goals: 1,108 (3.28 per match)
- Top goalscorer: Damir Čontala (23 goals)

The season began in August 2012 and ended in June 2013.

- Ilirska Bistrica and Stojnci withdrew after the 2011–12 season.

== Clubs East ==
Club	Location	Stadium	2011–12 position
Beltinci	Beltinci	Beltinci Sports Park	1st, Pomurska
Bistrica	Slovenska Bistrica	Slovenska Bistrica Sports Park	13th
Čarda	Martjanci	ŠRC Martjanci	4th
Dravograd	Dravograd	Dravograd Sports Centre	2nd
Grad	Grad	Igrišče Pod gradom	10th
Kovinar Štore	Štore	Na Lipi Stadium	8th
Ljutomer	Ljutomer	Ljutomer Sports Park	2nd, Pomurska
Malečnik	Malečnik	Berl Sports Centre	11th
Rakičan	Rakičan	Grajski Park Stadium	12th
Odranci	Odranci	ŠRC Odranci	9th
Šmarje pri Jelšah	Šmarje pri Jelšah	Sports Park	1st, Styrian
Tromejnik	Kuzma	Kuzma Football Stadium	6th
Veržej	Veržej	Čistina Stadium	7th
Zreče	Zreče	Zreče Stadium	5th

=== League standing ===
Pos	Team	Pld	W	D	L	GF	GA	GD	Pts	Promotion or relegation
1	Veržej (C, P)	26	16	2	8	57	32	+25	50	Promotion to Slovenian Second League
2	Odranci	26	14	5	7	45	32	+13	47	
3	Šmarje pri Jelšah	26	14	5	7	63	31	+32	47	
4	Beltinci	26	14	4	8	55	41	+14	46	
5	Dravograd (R)	26	14	3	9	55	38	+17	45	Withdrew from the competition
6	Čarda	26	11	5	10	45	53	−8	38	
7	Ljutomer	26	10	8	8	26	27	−1	38	
8	Tromejnik	26	11	4	11	58	49	+9	37	
9	Malečnik	26	10	4	12	35	41	−6	34	
10	Bistrica	26	9	5	12	29	39	−10	32	
11	Grad	26	9	2	15	38	48	−10	29	
12	Zreče (R)	26	8	5	13	21	44	−23	29	Withdrew from the competition
13	Rakičan	26	7	4	15	42	62	−20	25	
14	Kovinar Štore (R)	26	6	2	18	29	61	−32	20	Relegation to Slovenian Regional League

Source: MNZ Lendava
(C) Champions; (P) Promoted; (R) Relegated

== Clubs West ==
Club	Location	Stadium	2011–12 position
Adria	Miren	Igrišče Pri Štantu	11th
Ankaran Hrvatini	Ankaran	ŠRC Katarina	2nd
Bilje	Bilje	V Dolinci Stadium	1st, Littoral (Nova Gorica)
Brda	Dobrovo	Vipolže Stadium	9th
Ivančna Gorica	Ivančna Gorica	Ivančna Gorica Stadium	5th
Izola	Izola	Izola City Stadium	7th
Jadran	Dekani	Dekani Sports Park	3rd
Kamnik	Kamnik	Stadion Prijateljstva	10th
Rudar	Trbovlje	Rudar Stadium	1st, Ljubljana
Tabor	Sežana	Rajko Štolfa Stadium	2nd, Littoral (Koper)
Tolmin	Tolmin	Brajda Sports Park	4th
Zagorje	Zagorje ob Savi	Zagorje City Stadium	6th
Zarica	Kranj	Zarica Sports Park	8th

=== League standing ===
Pos	Team	Pld	W	D	L	GF	GA	GD	Pts	Promotion or relegation
1	Ankaran Hrvatini (C, P)	24	15	4	5	61	37	+24	49	Promotion to Slovenian Second League
2	Tolmin	24	12	7	5	42	32	+10	43	
3	Izola	24	11	6	7	49	31	+18	39	
4	Adria	24	11	5	8	44	38	+6	38	
5	Tabor Sežana	24	10	6	8	45	33	+12	36	
6	Zagorje	24	10	5	9	36	28	+8	35	
7	Brda	24	10	5	9	45	37	+8	35	
8	Ivančna Gorica	24	10	3	11	35	42	−7	33	
9	Rudar Trbovlje	24	9	5	10	25	32	−7	32	
10	Jadran Dekani	24	8	7	9	33	38	−5	31	
11	Zarica Kranj	24	7	8	9	34	39	−5	29	
12	Kamnik	24	6	3	15	28	70	−42	21	
13	Bilje (R)	24	3	4	17	33	53	−20	13	Relegation to Slovenian Regional League

Source: MNZ Ljubljana
(C) Champions; (P) Promoted; (R) Relegated

== See also ==
- 2012–13 Slovenian Second League
