= 2013–14 Slovenian Third League =

Slovenian Third League
- Season: 2013–14
- Champions: Dravinja (East); Tolmin (West)
- Promoted: Dravinja; Tolmin
- Relegated: Kamnik
- Matches: 364
- Goals: 1,238 (3.4 per match)
- Top goalscorer: Roman Gostan (25 goals)
- Biggest away win: Kamnik 0–16 Izola
- Highest scoring: Kamnik 0–16 Izola

The 2013–14 Slovenian Third League season began on 24 August 2013 and ended on 7 June 2014.

== Clubs East ==
Club	Location	Stadium	2012–13 position
Beltinci	Beltinci	Beltinci Sports Park	4th
Bistrica	Slovenska Bistrica	Slovenska Bistrica Sports Park	10th
Čarda	Martjanci	ŠRC Martjanci	6th
Drava	Ptuj	Ptuj City Stadium	1st, Ptuj
Dravinja	Slovenske Konjice	Dobrava Stadium	10th, 2.SNL
Grad	Grad	Igrišče Pod gradom	11th
Ljutomer	Ljutomer	Ljutomer Sports Park	7th
Malečnik	Malečnik	Berl Sports Centre	9th
Nafta 1903	Lendava	Lendava Sports Park	1st, Pomurska
Odranci	Odranci	ŠRC Odranci	2nd
Rakičan	Rakičan	Grajski Park Stadium	13th
Šentjur	Šentjur	Šentjur Sports Park	1st, Styrian
Šmarje	Šmarje pri Jelšah	Sports Park	3rd
Tromejnik	Kuzma	Kuzma Football Stadium	8th

=== League standing ===
Pos	Team	Pld	W	D	L	GF	GA	GD	Pts	Promotion
1	Dravinja (C, P)	26	20	6	0	82	16	+66	66	Promotion to Slovenian Second League
2	Drava Ptuj	26	18	3	5	59	23	+36	57	
3	Odranci	26	14	5	7	65	39	+26	47	
4	Rakičan	26	13	7	6	52	38	+14	46	
5	Beltinci	26	13	5	8	48	38	+10	44	
6	Šmarje pri Jelšah	26	13	3	10	65	43	+22	42	
7	Nafta 1903	26	11	6	9	39	38	+1	39	
8	Ljutomer	26	11	4	11	48	41	+7	37	
9	Malečnik	26	7	10	9	33	46	−13	31	
10	Tromejnik	26	9	3	14	44	53	−9	30	
11	Šentjur	26	8	1	17	31	80	−49	25	
12	Grad	26	5	7	14	39	55	−16	22	
13	Bistrica	26	4	4	18	40	70	−30	16	
14	Čarda	26	2	4	20	23	88	−65	10	

Source: MNZ Lendava
(C) Champions; (P) Promoted

== Clubs West ==
Club	Location	Stadium	2012–13 position
Adria	Miren	Igrišče Pri Štantu	4th
Ajdovščina Škou	Ajdovščina	Ajdovščina Stadium	2nd, Littoral^{1}
Brda	Dobrovo	Vipolže Stadium	7th
Ivančna Gorica	Ivančna Gorica	Ivančna Gorica Stadium	8th
Izola	Izola	Izola City Stadium	3rd
Jadran	Dekani	Dekani Sports Park	10th
Jezero	Medvode	Ob Sori Stadium	1st, Ljubljana
Kamnik	Kamnik	Stadion Prijateljstva	12th
Rudar	Trbovlje	Rudar Stadium	9th
Sava	Kranj	Stražišče Sports Park	1st, Carniolan
Tabor	Sežana	Rajko Štolfa Stadium	5th
Tolmin	Tolmin	Brajda Sports Park	2nd
Zagorje	Zagorje ob Savi	Zagorje City Stadium	6th
Zarica	Kranj	Zarica Sports Park	11th

1 Cerknica declined promotion.

=== League standing ===
Pos	Team	Pld	W	D	L	GF	GA	GD	Pts	Promotion
1	Tolmin (C, P)	26	18	6	2	58	21	+37	60	Promotion to Slovenian Second League
2	Zarica Kranj	26	16	5	5	56	36	+20	53	
3	Zagorje	26	11	7	8	36	30	+6	40	
4	Ivančna Gorica	26	12	4	10	41	32	+9	40	
5	Izola	26	12	4	10	66	47	+19	40	
6	Rudar Trbovlje	26	12	4	10	32	38	−6	40	
7	Jadran Dekani	26	10	9	7	47	28	+19	39	
8	Brda	26	10	8	8	31	19	+12	38	
9	Tabor Sežana	26	8	10	8	42	33	+9	34	
10	Ajdovščina Škou	26	9	3	14	38	47	−9	30	
11	Adria	26	9	3	14	37	59	−22	30	
12	Jezero Medvode	26	8	5	13	32	33	−1	29	
13	Sava Kranj	26	7	6	13	38	49	−11	27	
14	Kamnik (R)	26	2	2	22	16	98	−82	8	Withdrew from the competition

Source: MNZ Ljubljana
(C) Champions; (P) Promoted; (R) Relegated

== See also ==
- 2013–14 Slovenian Second League
