= 1992–93 Slovenian Third League =

Slovenian Third League
- Season: 1992–93
- Champions: Veržej (East); Piran (West)
- Relegated: Rogašovci; Stojnci; Jadran Hrpelje-Kozina; Creina Primskovo; Zarica; Adria; Tolmin
- Matches: 364
- Goals: 1,000 (2.75 per match)

The 1992–93 Slovenian Third League was the first season of the Slovenian Third League, the third highest level in the Slovenian football system.

== League standings ==
=== East ===
Pos	Team	Pld	W	D	L	GF	GA	GD	Pts	Promotion or relegation
1	Veržej (C, P)	26	16	5	5	69	34	+35	37	Promotion to Slovenian Second League
2	Bistrica	26	16	1	9	35	21	+14	33	
3	Kovinar Maribor	26	13	5	8	44	31	+13	31	
4	Partizan	26	11	6	9	45	40	+5	28	
5	Papirničar Radeče	26	8	10	8	32	27	+5	26	
6	Pobrežje	26	11	4	11	39	39	0	26	
7	Ižakovci	26	9	7	10	38	46	−8	25	
8	Žalec	26	9	7	10	27	39	−12	25	
9	Pohorje	26	7	10	9	34	35	−1	24	
10	Kungota	26	9	6	11	32	43	−11	24	
11	Rače	26	9	5	12	30	32	−2	23	
12	Aluminij	26	8	6	12	35	41	−6	22	
13	Rogašovci (R)	26	6	10	10	37	45	−8	22	Relegation to Slovenian Regional Leagues
14	Stojnci (R)	26	5	8	13	25	44	−19	18	Relegation to Slovenian Regional Leagues

(C) Champions; (P) Promoted; (R) Relegated

=== West ===
Pos	Team	Pld	W	D	L	GF	GA	GD	Pts	Promotion or relegation
1	Piran (C, P)	26	17	9	0	55	11	+44	43	Promotion to Slovenian Second League
2	Tabor 69	26	15	7	4	43	11	+32	37	
3	Brda	26	12	7	7	31	28	+3	31	
4	Renče	26	11	8	7	33	27	+6	30	
5	Litija	26	10	9	7	35	28	+7	29	
6	Svoboda Kisovec	26	11	7	8	38	32	+6	29	
7	Bilje	26	10	8	8	27	25	+2	28	
8	Korotan Šempas	26	9	10	7	33	39	−6	28	
9	Škofja Loka	26	8	11	7	29	30	−1	27	
10	Jadran Hrpelje-Kozina (R)	26	9	7	10	38	33	+5	25	Relegation to Slovenian Regional Leagues
11	Creina Primskovo (R)	26	7	7	12	32	32	0	21	Relegation to Slovenian Regional Leagues
12	Zarica (R)	26	5	6	15	19	41	−22	16	Relegation to Slovenian Regional Leagues
13	Adria (R)	26	3	7	16	20	54	−34	13	Relegation to Slovenian Regional Leagues
14	Tolmin (R)	26	1	5	20	15	57	−42	7	Relegation to Slovenian Regional Leagues

(C) Champions; (P) Promoted; (R) Relegated

== See also ==
- 1992–93 Slovenian Second League
