= Gal Gorenak =

Slovenian footballer (born 2003)

Personal information
- Date of birth: 24 October 2003 (age 23)
- Place of birth: Slovenia
- Height: 1.79 m (5 ft 10 in)
- Position: Midfielder

Team information
- Current team: Rudar Velenje (on loan from Bistrica)

Youth career
- 2010–2017: Dravinja
- 2017–2021: Maribor

Senior career*
Years	Team	Apps	(Gls)
2021–2023	Maribor	10	(1)
2022	→ Ilirija 1911 (loan)	11	(1)
2022–2023	→ Aluminij (loan)	23	(0)
2023–2025	Aluminij	49	(1)
2025–	Bistrica	14	(2)
2026–	→ Rudar Velenje (loan)	0	(0)

International career
2019	Slovenia U16	2	(2)
2021	Slovenia U18	2	(0)
2021	Slovenia U19	3	(0)
- * Club domestic league appearances and goals as of 16 February 2026

Gal Gorenak (born 24 October 2003) is a Slovenian footballer who plays as a midfielder for Slovenian Second League club Rudar Velenje, on loan from Bistrica.
