= Kurež =

Kurež is a surname. Notable people with the surname include:

- Gal Kurež (born 2001), Slovenian footballer
- Robert Kurež (born 1991), Slovenian footballer
