= Ishaq Rafiu =

Nigerian footballer

Personal information
- Full name: Ishaq Kayode Rafiu
- Date of birth: 16 December 2000 (age 25)
- Place of birth: Offa, Nigeria
- Height: 1.78 m (5 ft 10 in)
- Position: Winger

Team information
- Current team: Primorje
- Number: 31

Youth career
- Abraysports

Senior career*
Years	Team	Apps	(Gls)
2017–2018	Shooting Stars	2	(0)
2019	Remo Stars	1	(0)
2019–2022	Rivers United	60	(15)
2022–2024	Maribor	6	(0)
2024–	Primorje	59	(5)

International career
2022	Nigeria	1	(0)
- * Club domestic league appearances and goals as of 31 May 2026

Ishaq Kayode Rafiu (born 16 December 2000) is a Nigerian professional footballer who plays as a winger for Slovenian Second League club Primorje.

== Club career ==
=== Early career ===
Rafiu made his senior debut for Shooting Stars in the Nigeria Professional Football League during the 2017 season, making two appearances. After a brief spell with Remo Stars in 2019, he joined Rivers United before the 2019–20 season. During the 2021–22 season, Rafiu scored 14 goals and provided 3 assists for Rivers United, helping his team to clinch the league title. Overall, he made 60 appearances and scored 15 league goals for Rivers United over the course of three seasons.

=== Maribor ===
On 26 July 2022, reigning Slovenian PrvaLiga champions Maribor announced that they had signed Rafiu on a three-year contract. However, the following day, Rivers United issued a statement that his contract with the club was still valid and that any transaction to another club without their consent was null and void. Almost two months later, on 13 September, his transfer to Maribor was finally completed after all the necessary documents were obtained. He made his debut for Maribor in the 13th round of the 2022–23 Slovenian PrvaLiga season on 15 October 2022 against Olimpija Ljubljana, when he replaced Andraž Žinič late in the match. A few days later, he scored his first goal for the club in a 9–0 victory over lower league side Limbuš-Pekre in the second round of the Slovenian Cup.

After the 2023–24 season, his contract with Maribor was terminated.

== International career ==
Rafiu made his international debut for Nigeria in a friendly match against Mexico on 28 May 2022.

== Honours ==
Rivers United

- Nigeria Professional Football League: 2021–22
