= DNŠ Zavrč =

Zavrč
- Full name: Društvo nogometna šola Zavrč
- Nicknames: Rumeno-zeleni (The Yellow and Greens)
- Founded: 2016; 10 years ago
- Ground: Zavrč Sports Park
- Capacity: 962
- Head coach: Mihael Leskovar
- League: MNZ Ptuj 1. Class
- 2025–26: 3. SNL – East, 7th of 14 (withdrew)
- Website: www.nkzavrc.si
Home colours

Društvo nogometna šola Zavrč or simply DNŠ Zavrč is a Slovenian football club from Zavrč. As of the 2026–27 season, they play in the MNZ Ptuj 1. Class, the fifth tier of Slovenian football. The club was founded in 2016.

== History ==
DNŠ Zavrč was founded in 2016 as the successor to NK Zavrč, a club that went bankrupt in the 2016–17 season. Legally, the two clubs' records and honours are kept separate by the Football Association of Slovenia.

== Stadium ==
Zavrč Sports Park, also known as Zavrč Stadium, is located in Zavrč. The stadium received floodlights in May 2012. However, the floodlights were removed in 2017 and sold to Aluminij due to financial problems of the club. In 2013 the stadium was completely renovated with the old stand demolished and a new main stand constructed, which opened in 2015. The stand has a seating capacity of 962.

== Honours ==
- Slovenian Fifth Division

Winners: 2018–19

- Slovenian Sixth Division

Winners: 2017–18

== Season-by-season record ==
Season	League	Position	Cup
2017–18	MNZ Ptuj 2. Class (level 6)	1st	Did not qualify
2018–19	MNZ Ptuj 1. Class (level 5)	1st	Did not qualify
2019–20	Ptuj Super League	8th	Did not qualify
2020–21	Ptuj Super League	1st (Note: The season ended early due to the COVID-19 pandemic in Slovenia. Zavrč was promoted with a draw conducted by the Football Association of Slovenia.)	Did not qualify
2021–22	3. SNL – East	9th	Did not qualify
2022–23	3. SNL – East	8th	Round of 16
2023–24	3. SNL – East	9th	Round of 32
2024–25	3. SNL – East	9th	Round of 32
2025–26	3. SNL – East	7th	Round of 32
2026–27	MNZ Ptuj 1. Class (level 5)		
