= Alessio Codromaz =

Italian footballer of Slovene origin (born 1994)

Personal information
- Date of birth: 5 June 1994 (age 32)
- Place of birth: Trieste, Italy
- Height: 1.91 m (6 ft 3 in)
- Position: Centre-back

Team information
- Current team: ASD Codroipo Calcio

Youth career
- ASD Virtus Corno
- Vicenza
- 2012–2013: Gorica

Senior career*
Years	Team	Apps	(Gls)
2013–2015	Gorica	4	(0)
2013–2014	→ Brda (loan)	16	(0)
2014–2015	→ Tolmin (loan)	22	(0)
2015	Tolmin	2	(0)
2016	Cjarlins Muzane		
2016–2020	ASD Brian Lignano Calcio		
2020–2021	Portogruaro		
2021–	ASD Codroipo Calcio		
- * Club domestic league appearances and goals as of 11 February 2026

Alessio Codromaz (born 5 June 1994) is an Italian footballer who play as a centre back for ASD Codroipo Calcio.

== Club career ==
Codromaz started his career at Friuli club Corno. He then moved to Veneto club Vicenza. Codromaz was a full member of "Primavera" under-20 team in 2011–12 season. He was released on 30 June 2012. In August 2012 he was signed by Slovenian club ND Gorica on a free transfer. He signed a 4-year contract on 1 July 2013. On 9 August 2013 he left for Brda. He also played 4 times for Gorica at the start of 2013–14 Slovenian PrvaLiga.

On 3 September 2014 he left for Tolmin on a one-year deal. He renewed the contract on 6 August 2015.
