= Mestni Stadion =

Mestni Stadion (Slovene for "City Stadium") can refer to:

- Ptuj City Stadium
- Izola City Stadium
- Fazanerija City Stadium
- Ajdovščina Stadium
- Rajko Štolfa Stadium, old name for Stadion Rajko Štolfa
- Lendava Sports Park, old name for Športni park Lendava
- Stanko Mlakar Stadium, old name for Športni Center Kranj
