= Luka Gajič =

Slovenian footballer

Personal information
- Date of birth: 6 May 1996 (age 30)
- Place of birth: Slovenia
- Height: 1.83 m (6 ft 0 in)
- Position: Forward

Team information
- Current team: Jezero Medvode

Youth career
- –2014: Interblock
- 2014–2015: Olimpija Ljubljana

Senior career*
Years	Team	Apps	(Gls)
2014–2017	Olimpija Ljubljana	2	(0)
2014	→ Radomlje (loan)	13	(0)
2015–2017	→ Radomlje (loan)	36	(5)
2017	→ Krško (loan)	11	(1)
2018	Bravo	4	(0)
2019	Radomlje	10	(0)
2019–2021	Dob	30	(4)
2021	Ilirija 1911	4	(0)
2021–2023	Dob	35	(11)
2023–2024	SAK Klagenfurt	29	(6)
2024	SC Landskron	14	(7)
2025–2026	SAK Klagenfurt	38	(6)
2026–	Jezero Medvode		

International career
2011–2012	Slovenia U16	9	(2)
2012–2013	Slovenia U17	10	(0)
2013	Slovenia U18	5	(1)
2013–2014	Slovenia U19	14	(4)
2017	Slovenia U21	1	(0)
- * Club domestic league appearances and goals as of 28 August 2026

Luka Gajič (born 6 May 1996) is a Slovenian footballer who plays as a forward for Jezero Medvode.
