= Samuel Pedro =

Portuguese footballer

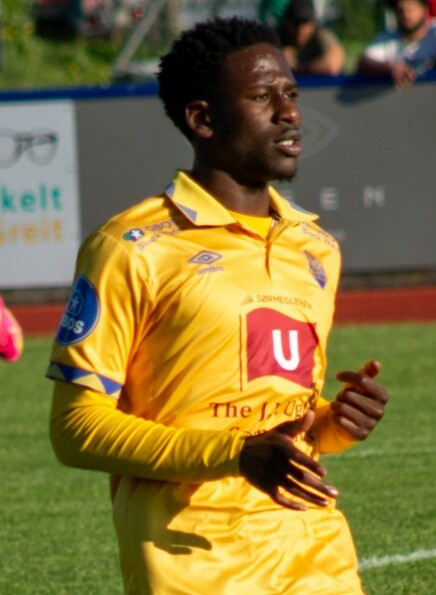
- Pedro with FK Jerv in 2023

Personal information
- Full name: Samuel Lopes Robalo Pedro
- Date of birth: 24 April 2001 (age 25)
- Place of birth: Aveiro, Portugal
- Height: 1.80 m (5 ft 11 in)
- Positions: Winger; forward

Team information
- Current team: Riga FC
- Number: 15

Youth career
- 2009–2015: Beira-Mar
- 2015–2016: Gafanha
- 2016–2017: Palmeiras Braga
- 2017–2018: Braga
- 2018–2019: Boavista

Senior career*
Years	Team	Apps	(Gls)
2019–2020	Boavista	1	(0)
2020–2022	Benfica B	26	(2)
2021–2022	→ Covilhã (loan)	13	(1)
2022–2023	Olimpija Ljubljana	13	(1)
2023–2024	Jerv	24	(14)
2024–2026	Dubai United	37	(13)
2026–	Riga FC	7	(1)

International career
2020	Portugal U19	1	(0)
- * Club domestic league appearances and goals as of 12 November 2026

Samuel Lopes Robalo Pedro (born 24 April 2001) is a Portuguese professional footballer who plays as a winger or forward for Latvian Higher League club Riga FC.

== Club career ==
=== Boavista ===
Born in Aveiro, Pedro began playing football at hometown club Beira-Mar, and played for several other youth teams including Braga and Boavista. He made his professional debut in his only appearance for the latter on 6 December 2019, a 4–1 Primeira Liga home loss to Benfica in which he came on as a 69th-minute substitute for Gustavo Sauer.

=== Benfica ===
On 20 January 2020, 18-year-old Pedro signed a contract of undisclosed length at Benfica, while Boavista retained 50% of his economic rights. He played for the B-team in the second tier, scoring his first senior goal on 25 November to decide a 3–2 win at nearby Cova da Piedade.

Pedro was loaned to Covilhã in the same league on 5 January 2022. He played 13 games over the remainder of the season, being recalled two games early as the team stayed up via the play-offs; he scored once as a late substitute on 13 March to conclude a 2–0 home win over Trofense.

=== Olimpija Ljubljana ===
On 8 July 2022, Pedro signed a three-year contract with Slovenian PrvaLiga side Olimpija Ljubljana. He made his debut nine days later as the season began with a 2–0 home win over Mura, in which he came on after 58 minutes for Aldair and scored in added time.

=== Jerv ===
On 14 February 2023, Pedro signed a one-year contract with Norwegian First Division club Jerv. He finished the 2023 season as the league's second top goalscorer, with 14 goals in 24 matches; Jerv, however, finished in penultimate place, getting relegated to the Second Division.

== International career ==
Born in Portugal, Pedro is of Angolan descent. He was capped once by Portugal at under-19 level. On 25 February 2020, he played the first half of a 3–1 friendly win over France in Marinha Grande.
