= Goran Vuk =

Slovenian footballer

Personal information
- Date of birth: 11 October 1987 (age 39)
- Place of birth: Jajce, SFR Yugoslavia
- Height: 1.86 m (6 ft 1 in)
- Position: Forward

Team information
- Current team: Kamnik

Youth career
- Kamnik

Senior career*
Years	Team	Apps	(Gls)
2006–2008	Kamnik		
2008–2010	SF Rückersdorf	47	(37)
2010–2012	Dob	52	(25)
2012–2014	Domžale	52	(5)
2014–2015	Radomlje	26	(1)
2015–2016	FC Poggersdorf	29	(14)
2016–2018	SV Arnoldstein	54	(76)
2018–2019	SV Eberstein	30	(15)
2019–2022	SV Arnoldstein	55	(72)
2022–	Kamnik		
- * Club domestic league appearances and goals

Goran Vuk (born 11 October 1987) is a Slovenian footballer who plays as a forward for Kamnik.

== Personal life ==
His younger brother, Slobodan Vuk, is also a professional footballer.
