= Pascal Estrada =

Austrian footballer (born 2002)

Personal information
- Full name: Pascal Juan Estrada
- Date of birth: 12 March 2002 (age 24)
- Place of birth: Linz, Austria
- Height: 1.87 m (6 ft 2 in)
- Position: Centre-back

Team information
- Current team: Kolding
- Number: 33

Youth career
- 2008–2010: ASKÖ Leonding
- 2010–2016: FC Pasching
- 2016–2018: LASK Linz
- 2018–2020: Wolverhampton Wanderers

Senior career*
Years	Team	Apps	(Gls)
2020–2022	Wolverhampton Wanderers	0	(0)
2022–2024	Olimpija Ljubljana	34	(1)
2024–2025	Rheindorf Altach	33	(2)
2025–	Kolding	13	(0)

International career
2020	Austria U18	2	(0)
2022–2024	Austria U21	20	(2)
- * Club domestic league appearances and goals as of 2 June 2026

Pascal Juan Estrada (born 12 March 2002) is an Austrian professional footballer who plays as a centre-back for Danish 1st Division club Kolding IF.

== Club career ==
In 2018, Estrada joined the youth academy of English Premier League side Wolverhampton Wanderers. In 2022, he signed for Olimpija Ljubljana in Slovenia. On 17 July 2022, he debuted for Olimpija during a 2–0 win over Mura in the first round of the 2022–23 Slovenian PrvaLiga.

On transfer deadline day, September 1, 2025, Estrada transferred to the Danish 1st Division club Kolding IF on a deal until June 2028.

== International career ==
Estrada was capped for Austria at under-18 level, making two appearances against Cyprus in February 2020.

== Personal life ==
Estrada's father, Mario Mühlbauer, was also a professional footballer.
