= Gal Kurež =

Slovenian footballer (born 2001)

Personal information
- Date of birth: 27 April 2001 (age 25)
- Place of birth: Slovenia
- Height: 1.82 m (6 ft 0 in)
- Positions: Forward; winger

Team information
- Current team: Brinje Grosuplje

Youth career
- Svoboda Kisovec
- Rudar Trbovlje
- 2010–2011: Domžale
- 2011–2020: Olimpija Ljubljana

Senior career*
Years	Team	Apps	(Gls)
2020–2022	Olimpija Ljubljana	32	(1)
2022–2023	Bravo	12	(1)
2023–2024	Tikvesh	18	(1)
2024	Rogaška	16	(2)
2024–2025	Mura	16	(0)
2025–2026	Enosis Neon Paralimni	21	(1)
2026–	Brinje Grosuplje	0	(0)

International career
2019–2020	Slovenia U19	4	(0)
2021	Slovenia U21	1	(0)
- * Club domestic league appearances and goals as of 25 August 2026

Gal Kurež (born 27 April 2001) is a Slovenian footballer who plays for Brinje Grosuplje.
