= Zavrč Sports Park =

Football stadium in Zavrč, Slovenia

- Interactive map of Zavrč Sports Park
- Full name: Športni park Zavrč
- Location: Zavrč, Slovenia
- Coordinates: 46°23′0″N 16°2′53″E
- Capacity: 962
- Surface: Grass

Construction
- Renovated: 2003, 2013–2015
- Expanded: 2013–2015

Tenant
- DNŠ Zavrč

Zavrč Sports Park is a football stadium in Zavrč, Slovenia. It is used as the home venue of DNŠ Zavrč. The stadium has a seating capacity of 962 spectators.

The stadium was renovated in 2003 and expanded between 2013 and 2015, when the ground was completely reconstructed as the old stand was demolished and a new main stand constructed with a seating capacity of 962. The floodlights were installed in May 2012. In 2017, the floodlights were removed and transferred to the Aluminij Sports Park due to financial problems of the club.
