= NK Rakičan =

Slovenian football club

Rakičan
- Full name: Nogometni klub Rakičan
- Founded: 1950; 76 years ago
- Ground: Igrišče Rakičan
- President: Borut Vouri
- Head coach: Ljubo Antolin
- League: 1. MNL Murska Sobota
- 2025–26: Pomurska League, 12th of 12 (relegated)
Home colours	Away colours

Nogometni klub Rakičan (English: Rakičan Football Club), commonly referred to as NK Rakičan or simply Rakičan, is a Slovenian football club which plays in the town of Rakičan. The club was established in 1950.

== Honours ==
- Slovenian Fourth Division
  - Winners: 1994–95, 2000–01, 2010–11, 2018–19

== League history since 1991 ==
Season	League	Position
1991–92	Pomurska League	10th
1992–93	1. MNL (level 4)	5th
1993–94	1. MNL (level 4)	10th
1994–95	1. MNL (level 4)	1st (Note: Lost promotion play-offs for the Slovenian Third League.)
1995–96	1. MNL (level 4)	4th
1996–97	1. MNL (level 4)	5th
1997–98	1. MNL (level 4)	5th
1998–99	1. MNL (level 4)	9th
1999–2000	1. MNL (level 4)	2nd
2000–01	1. MNL (level 4)	1st
2001–02	3. SNL – East	13th
2002–03	1. MNL (level 4)	7th
2003–04	1. MNL (level 4)	3rd
2004–05	Pomurska League	7th
2005–06	Pomurska League	8th
2006–07	Pomurska League	8th
2007–08	Pomurska League	2nd
2008–09	Pomurska League	8th
2009–10	Pomurska League	3rd
2010–11	Pomurska League	1st
2011–12	3. SNL – East	12th
2012–13	3. SNL – East	13th

Season	League	Position
2013–14	3. SNL – East	4th
2014–15	3. SNL – East	8th
2015–16	3. SNL – East	12th
2016–17	3. SNL – East	10th
2017–18	3. SNL – East	9th (Note: Failed to obtain a competition licence.)
2018–19	Pomurska League	1st (Note: Declined promotion.)
2019–20	Pomurska League	12th
2020–21	Pomurska League	13th (Note: The season was halted in October 2020 due to the COVID-19 pandemic in Slovenia.)
2021–22	Pomurska League	6th
2022–23	Pomurska League	13th
2023–24	Pomurska League	13th
2024–25	Pomurska League	10th
2025–26	Pomurska League	12th
2026–27	1. MNL (level 5)	
