= Mitja Novinič =

Slovenian footballer

Personal information
- Date of birth: 10 April 1991 (age 35)
- Place of birth: Lendava, Slovenia
- Height: 1.75 m (5 ft 9 in)
- Position: Midfielder

Team information
- Current team: SV Union Sturm Klöch
- Number: 10

Youth career
- –2007: Nafta Lendava
- 2007–2011: AC Milan

Senior career*
Years	Team	Apps	(Gls)
2011–2014	AC Milan	0	(0)
2011–2012	→ Virtus Lanciano (loan)	12	(0)
2012–2013	→ Teramo (loan)	25	(0)
2015	VfL Leverkusen	0	(0)
2015–2016	Blau-Weiß Friesdorf	28	(2)
2016–2024	Nafta 1903	188	(18)
2024–	SV Union Sturm Klöch	13	(4)

International career
2006–2007	Slovenia U16	7	(1)
2007–2008	Slovenia U17	9	(1)
2008–2009	Slovenia U19	5	(0)
2010	Slovenia U21	2	(0)
- * Club domestic league appearances and goals as of 1 January 2025

Mitja Novinič (born 10 April 1991) is a Slovenian footballer who plays as a midfielder for SV Union Sturm Klöch.

== Career ==
=== Early career ===
Novinič joined Italian club AC Milan from Nafta Lendava in June 2007. He spent four seasons in the club's youth system and was a member of the under-20 side who won the Coppa Italia Primavera in 2010, 25 years after the club's last success in the competition.

Novinič was also called-up a couple of times for first-team games since 2009, but eventually he was never fielded nor named on the bench.

=== Lanciano ===
For the 2011–12 season, Novinič was loaned out to Prima Divisione club Virtus Lanciano. He made his official debut for the club on 7 August 2011, in the first preliminary round of the Coppa Italia against Castel Girone, coming off the bench in the second half, as Lanciano lost 2–1. He went on to make 12 league appearances, as Lanciano won promotion to Serie B through the play-offs.

=== Teramo ===
At the beginning of the 2012–13 season, Novinič was sent on loan to Seconda Divisione club Teramo.
