= Velesovo =

- Location in Slovenia
- Coordinates: 46°16′7.03″N 14°27′7.65″E
- Country: Slovenia
- Traditional Region: Upper Carniola
- Statistical region: Upper Carniola
- Municipality: Cerklje na Gorenjskem
- Elevation: 430.1 m (1,411 ft)

Population (2020)
  - Total: 395

Velesovo (pronounced [ʋɛˈleːsɔʋɔ]; German: Michelstetten) is a settlement in the Municipality of Cerklje na Gorenjskem in the Upper Carniola region of Slovenia.
