= Grajena =

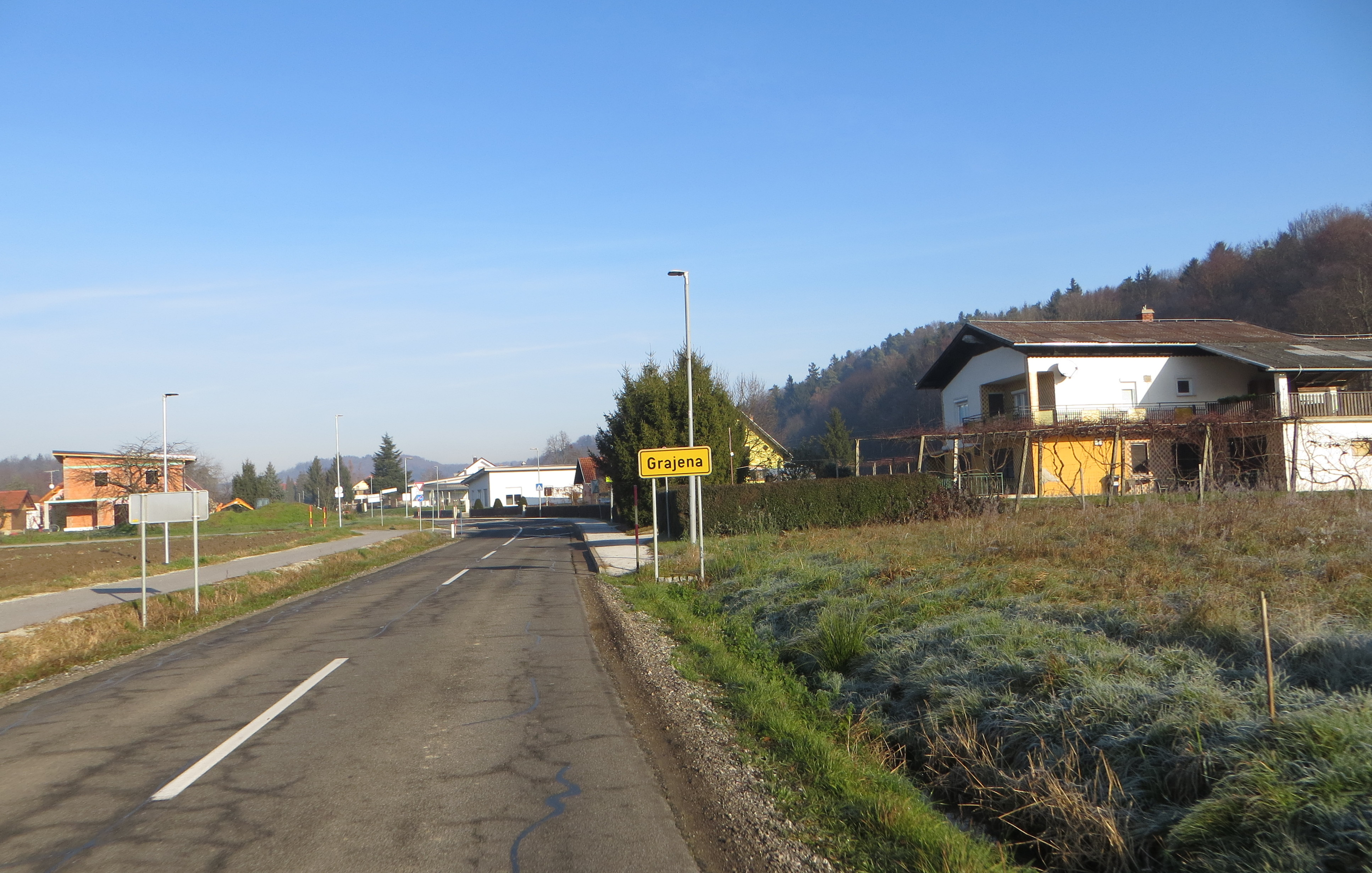

- Location in Slovenia
- Coordinates: 46°27′21.73″N 15°50′23.32″E
- Country: Slovenia
- Traditional region: Styria
- Statistical region: Drava
- Municipality: Ptuj

Area
  - Total: 1.76 km^{2} (0.68 sq mi)
- Elevation: 261.8 m (859 ft)

Population (2002)
  - Total: 324

Grajena (pronounced [ɡɾaˈjɛːna]) is a settlement located on the Grajena Creek in the Municipality of Ptuj in northeastern Slovenia. The area is part of the traditional region of Styria. It is now included with the rest of the municipality in the Drava Statistical Region.

Parts of the Roman water system supplying nearby Poetovio has been identified near the settlement.
