= Spodnja Hajdina =

- Location in Slovenia
- Coordinates: 46°24′49.12″N 15°50′29.87″E
- Country: Slovenia
- Traditional region: Styria
- Statistical region: Drava
- Municipality: Hajdina

Area
  - Total: 1.57 km^{2} (0.61 sq mi)
- Elevation: 227.7 m (747 ft)

Population (2002)
  - Total: 195

Spodnja Hajdina (pronounced [ˈspoːdnja xai̯ˈdiːna]) is a settlement in the Municipality of Hajdina in northeastern Slovenia. The area is part of the traditional region of Styria. It is now included with the rest of the municipality in the Drava Statistical Region.

Part of the Roman settlement of Poetovio with Mithraic temples and a burial ground has been excavated at an archaeological site near the present-day settlement.
