= NK Jadran Hrpelje-Kozina =

Slovenian football club

Jadran Hrpelje-Kozina
- Full name: Nogometni klub Jadran Hrpelje-Kozina
- Founded: 1976; 50 years ago
- Ground: Krvavi Potok Stadium
- League: Littoral League
- 2025–26: Littoral League, 3rd of 11
Home colours	Away colours

Nogometni klub Jadran Hrpelje-Kozina (English: Jadran Hrpelje-Kozina Football Club), commonly referred to as NK Jadran Hrpelje-Kozina, is a Slovenian football club from Kozina that competes in the Littoral League, the fourth highest league in Slovenia. The club was founded in 1976.

== Honours ==
- Littoral League (fourth tier)
  - Winners: 1993–94, 2021–22, 2022–23
