= NK Kranj =

Slovenian football club

Zarica Kranj
- Full name: Nogometni klub Zarica Kranj
- Nickname: Rdeči (The Reds)
- Founded: 1973; 53 years ago (as NK Filmarji)
- Ground: Zarica Sports Park
- President: Refik Islamović
- League: Upper Carniolan League
- 2025–26: Upper Carniolan League, 8th of 13
- Website: www.nkkranj.si
Home colours	Away colours

Nogometni klub Zarica Kranj (English: Zarica Kranj Football Club), commonly referred to as NK Kranj or NK Zarica, is a Slovenian football club based in Kranj that competes in the Upper Carniolan League, the fourth tier of the Slovenian football pyramid. The club was founded in 1973.

== Honours ==
- Slovenian Third League
  - Winners: 2014–15
- Upper Carniolan League (fourth tier)
  - Winners: 2006–07, 2023–24
- MNZG Kranj Cup
  - Winners: 2005–06

== League history since 1991 ==
Season	League	Position
1991–92	MNZ Kranj (level 3)	2nd
1992–93	3. SNL – West	12th
1993–94	MNZ Kranj (level 4)	5th
1994–95	MNZ Kranj (level 4)	5th
1995–96	MNZ Kranj (level 4)	2nd
1996–97	MNZ Kranj (level 4)	5th
1997–98	MNZ Kranj (level 4)	3rd
1998–99	3. SNL – Centre	11th
1999–2000	3. SNL – Centre	12th
2000–01	3. SNL – Centre	11th
2001–02	3. SNL – Centre	12th
2002–03	3. SNL – Centre	6th
2003–04	3. SNL – Centre	5th
2004–05	3. SNL – West	3rd
2005–06	3. SNL – West	13th
2006–07	Upper Carniolan League	1st
2007–08	3. SNL – West	3rd
2008–09	3. SNL – West	6th
2009–10	3. SNL – West	5th

Season	League	Position
2010–11	3. SNL – West	5th
2011–12	3. SNL – West	8th
2012–13	3. SNL – West	11th
2013–14	3. SNL – West	2nd
2014–15	3. SNL – Centre	1st
2015–16	2. SNL	7th
2016–17	2. SNL	8th
2017–18	2. SNL	15th
2018–19	Upper Carniolan League	7th
2019–20	Upper Carniolan League	4th
2020–21	Upper Carniolan League	7th
2021–22	Upper Carniolan League	4th
2022–23	Upper Carniolan League	3rd
2023–24	Upper Carniolan League	1st
2024–25	3. SNL – West	14th
2025–26	Upper Carniolan League	8th
