= NK Kolpa =

Slovenian football club

Kolpa
- Full name: Športno društvo NK Kolpa
- Founded: 1990; 36 years ago
- Ground: Podzemelj Sports Park
- President: Tomaž Kralj
- Head coach: Rok Gregorčič
- League: Ljubljana Regional League
- 2025–26: MNZ Ljubljana League, 2nd of 8 (promoted via play-offs)
- Website: www.nk-kolpa.si
Home colours	Away colours

Športno društvo NK Kolpa (English: NK Kolpa Sports Association), commonly referred to as NK Kolpa or simply Kolpa, is a Slovenian football team from the village of Podzemelj. The club was founded in 1990.

== History ==
Kolpa made its debut in the Slovenian Cup in the 1998–99 season, when they were eliminated in the first round. They also played in the Slovenian Third League, the third tier of Slovenian football, in 2004–05 and 2005–06, before being relegated back to the lower tiers. Kolpa returned to the Slovenian Third League in the 2014–15 season.

== Honours ==
- Slovenian Fourth Division
  - Winners: 1994–95, 2003–04
- Slovenian Fifth Division
  - Winners: 2023–24
