= Aldair Baldé =

Bissau-Guinean footballer

Aldair
Personal information
- Full name: Aldair Adulai Djaló Baldé
- Date of birth: 31 January 1992 (age 34)
- Place of birth: Vila Meã, Amarante, Portugal
- Height: 1.70 m (5 ft 7 in)
- Position: Winger

Team information
- Current team: Nea Salamis Famagusta
- Number: 17

Youth career
- 2002–2011: Penafiel

Senior career*
Years	Team	Apps	(Gls)
2011–2016	Penafiel	141	(12)
2016–2017	Olhanense	32	(3)
2017–2018	AEL Limassol	17	(1)
2018	Gil Vicente	9	(0)
2018–2019	União da Madeira	26	(1)
2019–2020	Onisilos Sotira	15	(4)
2020–2021	Tabor Sežana	33	(6)
2021–2023	Olimpija Ljubljana	61	(7)
2023–2024	Bodrum	12	(1)
2024	Şanlıurfaspor	15	(0)
2024–2025	KF Gostivari	22	(4)
2025–	Nea Salamis Famagusta	27	(4)

International career^{‡}
2012	Portugal U20	5	(1)
2012–2013	Portugal U21	6	(2)
2017	Guinea-Bissau	3	(1)
- * Club domestic league appearances and goals as of 11 October 2026 ‡ National team caps and goals as of 25 March 2017

Aldair Adulai Djaló Baldé (born 31 January 1992), known as Aldair, is a professional footballer who plays as a winger for Cypriot Second Division club Nea Salamis Famagusta. Born in Portugal, he plays for the Guinea-Bissau national team.

== Club career ==
Aldair joined Slovenian PrvaLiga side Olimpija Ljubljana on 15 July 2021.

He joined Turkish club Bodrum on 14 July 2023. Aldair made his league debut for Bodrum against Giresunspor on 12 August 2023.

== International career ==
Aldair was a youth international for Portugal before switching to Guinea Bissau for the 2017 Africa Cup of Nations. He made his debut in the opening 1–1 tie with Gabon on 14 January 2017.

== Career statistics ==
=== International ===
Scores and results list Guinea-Bissau's goal tally first, score column indicates score after each Aldair goal.

List of international goals scored by Aldair Baldé
No.	Date	Venue	Opponent	Score	Result	Competition
1	25 March 2017	Moses Mabhida Stadium, Durban, South Africa	South Africa	1–2	1–3	Friendly
