= NK Svoboda Kisovec =

Slovenian football club

Svoboda Kisovec
- Full name: Nogometni klub Svoboda Kisovec
- Founded: 1932; 94 years ago
- Ground: Kisovec Sports Park
- President: Aljoša Janežič
- Head coach: Tadej Grčar
- League: Ljubljana Regional League
- 2025–26: Ljubljana Regional League, 8th of 13
- Website: www.nk-svoboda.si
Home colours	Away colours

NK Svoboda Kisovec (Nogometni klub Svoboda Kisovec, 'Svoboda Kisovec Football Club'), commonly referred to as simply Svoboda Kisovec, is a Slovenian football club based in Kisovec. The club was founded in 1932.
