= NK Limbuš-Pekre =

Slovenian football club

Limbuš Pekre
- Full name: Nogometni klub Limbuš-Pekre
- Founded: 1973; 53 years ago (as NK Pekre)
- Ground: Pod Grajskim gričem
- President: Bogomir Špindler
- Head coach: Aljoša Nerat
- League: 3. SNL – East
- 2025–26: 1. MNZ Maribor, 1st of 12 (promoted)
| Home colours | Away colours |

Nogometni klub Limbuš-Pekre (English: Limbuš-Pekre Football Club) is a Slovenian football club based in Limbuš that competes in the Slovenian Third League, the third highest league in Slovenia. The club was founded in 1973 and is competing under the name Marles due to sponsorship reasons.

== Honours ==
- Slovenian Fourth Division

Winners: 2025–26

- Slovenian Fifth Division

Winners: 2009–10

- Slovenian Sixth Division

Winners: 2005–06
