= NK Rače =

Slovenian football club

Rače
- Full name: Nogometni klub Rače
- Founded: 1946; 80 years ago
- Ground: Rače Sports Park
- Capacity: 300
- President: Marko Mergeduš
- Head coach: Dalibor Peša
- League: 3. SNL – East
- 2025–26: 3. SNL – East, 10th of 14
Home colours	Away colours

Nogometni klub Rače (English: Rače Football Club), commonly referred to as NK Rače, is a Slovenian football club from the town of Rače that competes in the Slovenian Third League, the third tier of Slovenian football. The club was founded in 1946.

== Honours ==
- Slovenian Fourth Division

Winners: 2021–22, 2024–25

- Slovenian Fifth Division

Winners: 2016–17
