= NK Ilirska Bistrica =

Slovenian football club

Ilirska Bistrica
- Full name: Nogometni klub Ilirska Bistrica
- Founded: 1926; 99 years ago (as Nogometno društvo Zora)
- Ground: Trnovo Sports Centre
Home colours

Nogometni klub Ilirska Bistrica (English: Ilirska Bistrica Football Club), commonly referred to as NK Ilirska Bistrica or simply Ilirska Bistrica, is a Slovenian football club from Ilirska Bistrica. The club was founded in 1926.

== Honours ==
- Littoral League (fourth tier)
  - Winners: 1994–95, 2010–11
- MNZ Koper Cup
  - Winners: 2010–11
