= Zavrč =

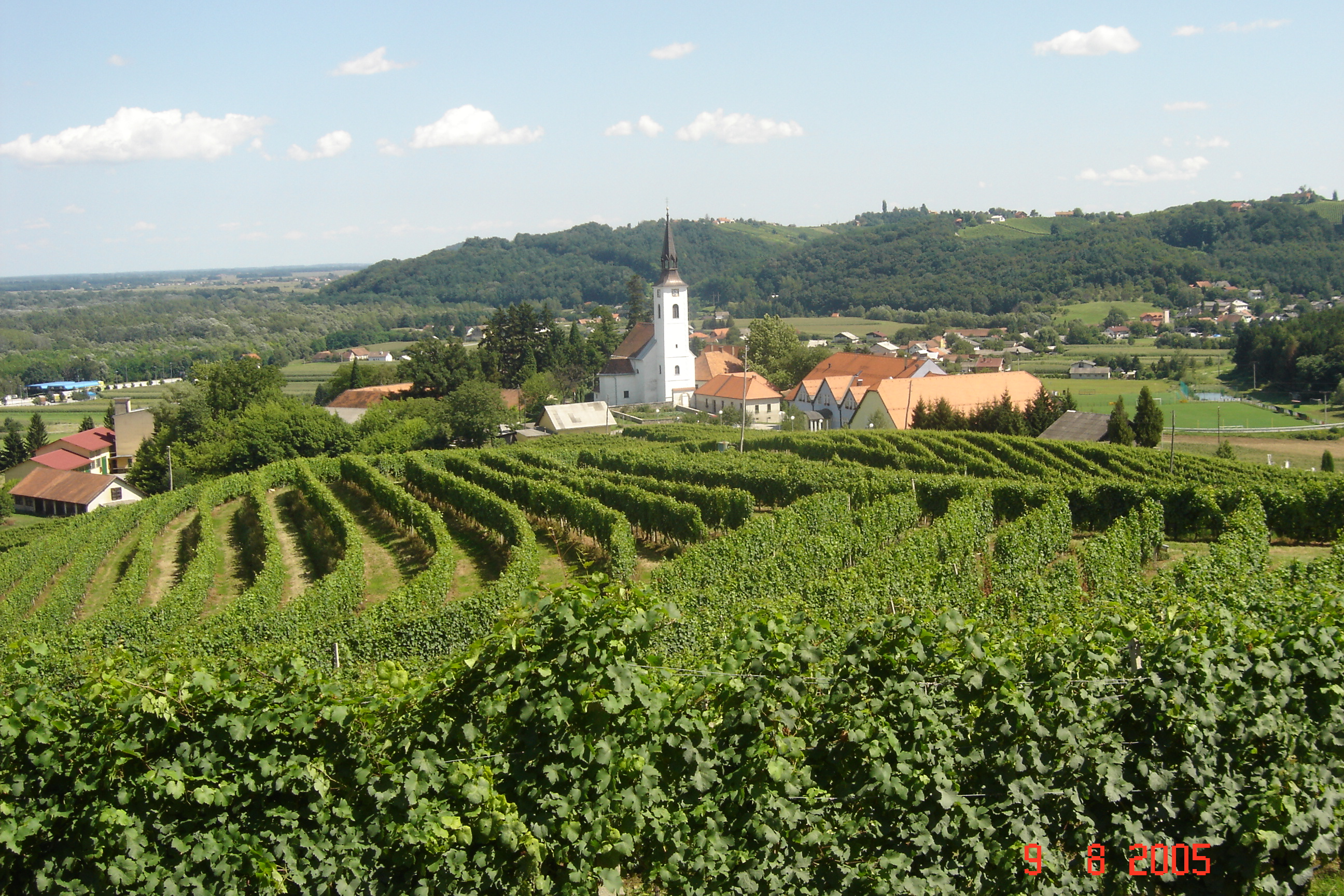

- Location in Slovenia
- Coordinates: 46°23′7.44″N 16°2′51.1″E
- Country: Slovenia
- Traditional region: Styria
- Statistical region: Drava
- Municipality: Zavrč

Area
  - Total: 1.59 km^{2} (0.61 sq mi)
- Elevation: 240.3 m (788 ft)

Population (2018)
  - Total: 73

Zavrč (pronounced [ˈzaːʋəɾtʃ], in older sources Zavrče, German: Sauritsch) is a settlement in the Haloze area of Slovenia. It is the seat of the Municipality of Zavrč. It lies between the right bank of the Drava River and the border with Croatia. The area traditionally belonged to the region of Styria. It is now included in the Drava Statistical Region.

== History ==
The Roman road that connected Poetovio and Mursa Maior led through the area. The parish church in Zavrč is dedicated to Saint Nicholas and belongs to the Roman Catholic Archdiocese of Maribor. It was first mentioned in written documents dating to 1430 as Saurig or Sauritsch. It was modified in the 17th and 18th centuries. The first school was established in 1671, when pupils were taught in a private house. Church records show that in 1812 the priest gave permission to reconstruct the classroom, so more pupils were able to attend. The school building was built in 1889. There is a second church on a small hill northwest of the settlement. It is dedicated to the Virgin Mary. Zavrč Mansion is a mansion close to the parish church. It was built in the 17th century and expanded in 1718. It now houses the municipal authorities.

== Sports ==
The local football club is called DNŠ Zavrč. They managed to get promoted all the way from the Slovenian sixth division to the top flight Slovenian PrvaLiga in five years between 2008 and 2013.
