= NK Bistrica =

Slovenian football club

Bistrica
- Full name: Nogometni klub Bistrica
- Founded: 1958; 68 years ago
- Ground: Slovenska Bistrica Sports Park
- Capacity: 964
- President: Mladen Dabanovič
- Head coach: Robert Pevnik
- League: Slovenian Second League
- 2025–26: Slovenian Second League, 6th of 16
- Website: www.nk-bistrica.si
Home colours	Away colours

Nogometni klub Bistrica (English: Bistrica Football Club), commonly referred to as NK Bistrica or simply Bistrica, is a Slovenian football club based in the town of Slovenska Bistrica. The club was established in 1958. They are currently named Kety Emmi & Impol Bistrica due to sponsorship reasons.

== Honours ==
- Slovenian Third League (East)
  - Winners: 2021–22
- Slovenian Fourth Division
  - Winners: 1998–99, 2000–01, 2009–10

== League history since 1991 ==
Season	League	Position
1991–92	2. SNL – East	11th
1992–93	3. SNL – East	2nd
1993–94	3. SNL – East	10th
1994–95	3. SNL – East	6th
1995–96	3. SNL – East	14th
1996–97	1. Class (level 4)	12th
1997–98	1. Class (level 4)	9th
1998–99	1. Class (level 4)	1st
1999–2000	3. SNL – North	13th
2000–01	1. Class (level 4)	1st
2001–02	3. SNL – North	6th
2002–03	3. SNL – North	2nd
2003–04	3. SNL – North	7th
2004–05	3. SNL – East	14th
2005–06	Styrian League	11th
2006–07	Styrian League	12th
2007–08	Styrian League	6th
2008–09	Styrian League	4th

Season	League	Position
2009–10	Styrian League	1st
2010–11	3. SNL – East	11th
2011–12	3. SNL – East	13th
2012–13	3. SNL – East	10th
2013–14	3. SNL – East	13th
2014–15	3. SNL – North	13th
2015–16	Ptuj Super League	7th
2016–17	Ptuj Super League	7th
2017–18	3. SNL – North	5th
2018–19	3. SNL – North	4th
2019–20	3. SNL – East	9th
2020–21	3. SNL – East	2nd
2021–22	3. SNL – East	1st
2022–23	2. SNL	9th
2023–24	2. SNL	7th
2024–25	2. SNL	6th
2025–26	2. SNL	6th
