= NK Jezero Medvode =

Slovenian football club

Jezero Medvode
- Full name: Nogometni klub Jezero Medvode
- Founded: 1973; 53 years ago
- Ground: Ob Sori Stadium
- League: Upper Carniolan League
- 2025–26: Upper Carniolan League, 7th of 13
Home colours	Away colours

Nogometni klub Jezero Medvode (English: Jezero Medvode Football Club), commonly referred to as NK Jezero Medvode or simply Jezero Medvode, is a Slovenian football club from Medvode, which competes in the Upper Carniolan League, the fourth tier of Slovenian football. The club was founded in 1973.

== Honours ==
- Ljubljana Regional League (fourth tier)
  - Winners: 2012–13
