= Slovenian Regional Leagues =

- Founded: 1991; 35 years ago
- Country: Slovenia
- Level on pyramid: 4
- Promotion to: Slovenian Third League
- Relegation to: MNZ Leagues

The Slovenian Regional Leagues (Slovene: Slovenske regionalne lige) are the fourth tier leagues in the Slovenian football system. They are alternately operated by the participating clubs' Intercommunal Football Associations (Slovene: Medobčinske nogometne zveze – MNZ). The winners of each division earn the right to play in the qualifiers for the Slovenian Third League.

== Regional Leagues ==
Current

- Littoral Football League (Slovene: Enotna primorska nogometna liga), consisting of clubs from the Slovene Littoral.
- Ljubljana Regional League (Slovene: Regionalna Ljubljanska liga), consisting of clubs from Lower Carniola and Inner Carniola.
- Pomurska Football League (Slovene: Pomurska nogometna liga), consisting of clubs from Prekmurje. The league ceased in 2013, but was reformed in 2019.
- Upper Carniolan Football League (Slovene: Gorenjska nogometna liga), consisting of clubs from Upper Carniola.
- Ptuj Super League (Slovene: Super liga MNZ Ptuj), consisting of clubs from the MNZ Ptuj Association.

Former

- Styrian Football League (Slovene: Štajerska nogometna liga), which consisted of clubs from Styria and Carinthia. The league ceased in 2014 and was replaced by the Intercommunal Leagues.

== Winners ==
Season	Ljubljana	Littoral
1991–92	Radomlje	Adria Miren
1992–93	Mengeš	Branik Šmarje
1993–94	Črnuče	Jadran Hrpelje Kozina
1994–95	Kolpa	Ilirska Bistrica
1995–96	Ilirija Ljubljana	Idrija
1996–97	Belinka	Ankaran
1997–98	Ivančna Gorica	Korte
1998–99	Tabor Grosuplje	Komen
1999–2000	Dragomer-Dren	Bilje
2000–01	Litija	Izola
2001–02	Slovan	Tolmin
2002–03	Radomlje	Košana
2003–04	Kolpa	Cerknica

1. The Slovenian Third League hadn't been established yet, so the regional and intercommunal leagues were the third level in the 1991–92 season.

Season	Ljubljana	Styrian	Littoral	Pomurska	Upper Carniolan	Ptuj
2004–05	Ihan	Malečnik	Bonifika	Odranci	Visoko	Not played
2005–06	Tabor 69	MU Šentjur	Portorož Piran	Odranci	Železniki	Not played
2006–07	Bežigrad	Šmartno 1928	Tolmin	Roma	Kranj	Not played
2007–08	Kamnik	Šampion	Tabor Sežana	Čarda	Sava Kranj	Not played
2008–09	Interblock Svoboda	Zreče	Ankaran Hrvatini	Tromejnik Kuzma	Lesce	Not played
2009–10	Ljubljana	Bistrica	Not played	Grad	Naklo	Not played
2010–11	Svoboda	Zavrč	Ilirska Bistrica	Rakičan	Jesenice	Not played
2011–12	Rudar Trbovlje	Šmarje pri Jelšah	Not played	Beltinci	Sava Kranj	Not played
2012–13	Jezero Medvode	Šentjur	Cerknica	Nafta 1903	Sava Kranj	Drava Ptuj
2013–14	Komenda	Fužinar	Bilje	Not played	Lesce	Stojnci
2014–15	Bravo	Not played	Vipava	Not played	Bitnje	Videm
2015–16	Jevnica	Not played	Postojna	Not played	Velesovo	Cirkulane
2016–17	Tabor 69	Not played	Korte	Not played	Bohinj	Gerečja vas
2017–18	Svoboda	Not played	Koper	Not played	Žiri	Cirkulane
2018–19	Kočevje	Not played	Ankaran	Not played	Bohinj	Podvinci
2019–20 (Note: The competitions were not finished due to the COVID-19 pandemic in Slovenia.)	Not finished	Not played	Not finished	Not finished	Not finished	Not finished
2020–21	Not finished	Not played	Not finished	Not finished	Not finished	Not finished
2021–22	Dren Vrhnika	Not played	Jadran Hrpelje-Kozina	Ljutomer	Visoko	Boč Poljčane
2022–23	Kočevje	Not played	Jadran Hrpelje-Kozina	Hotiza	Jesenice	Hajdina
2023–24	Rudar Trbovlje	Not played	Bistrc	Čarda	Zarica Kranj	Ormož
2024–25	IB 1975 Ljubljana	Not played	Idrija	Odranci	Bled-Bohinj	Ormož
2025–26	Litija	Not played	Adria	Odranci	Sava Kranj	Ormož
