= Rakičan =

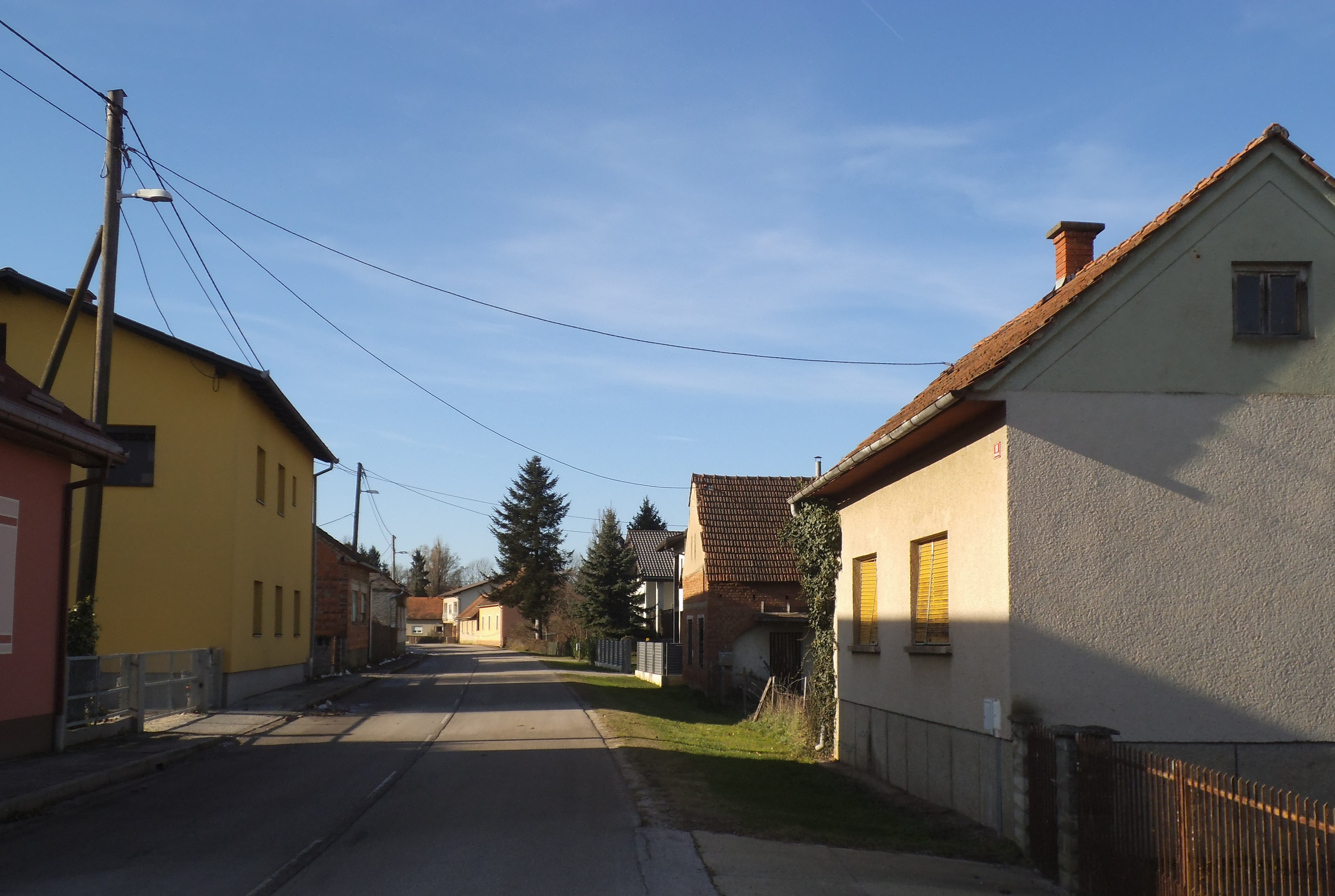
- Street in Rakičan

- Location in Slovenia
- Coordinates: 46°39′4″N 16°11′53″E
- Country: Slovenia
- Traditional region: Prekmurje
- Statistical region: Mura
- Municipality: Murska Sobota

Area
  - Total: 9.21 km^{2} (3.56 sq mi)
- Elevation: 185.7 m (609 ft)

Population (2020)
  - Total: 1,543

Rakičan (pronounced [ɾaˈkiːtʃan]; Hungarian: Battyánfalva) is a village in the Municipality of Murska Sobota in the Prekmurje region of Slovenia.

== Rakičan Castle ==
There is a Baroque mansion known as Rakičan Castle west of the main settlement. It stands in a large park and was originally a 17th-century castle, owned by the House of Batthyany, with defences that was remodelled in the 18th century.
