= MNK Izola =

Slovenian football club

Izola
- Full name: Nogometni klub Izola
- Nickname: Ribiči (The Fishermen)
- Founded: 1996; 30 years ago (as MNK Izola)
- Ground: Izola City Stadium
- Capacity: 5,085
- President: Damjan Pucer
- Head coach: Dominik Beršnjak
- League: 3. SNL – West
- 2025–26: 3. SNL – West, 5th of 14
- Website: nk-izola.si
Home colours	Away colours

Nogometni klub Izola (English: Izola Football Club), commonly referred to as NK Izola or simply Izola, is a Slovenian football club from Izola that competes in the Slovenian Third League, the third tier of Slovenian football. Izola was established in 1996 as Mladinski nogometni klub Izola (MNK Izola) after the dissolution of NK Izola, a club which folded following the 1995–96 Slovenian PrvaLiga season due to high financial debt. Legally, the two clubs' records and honours are kept separate by the Football Association of Slovenia.

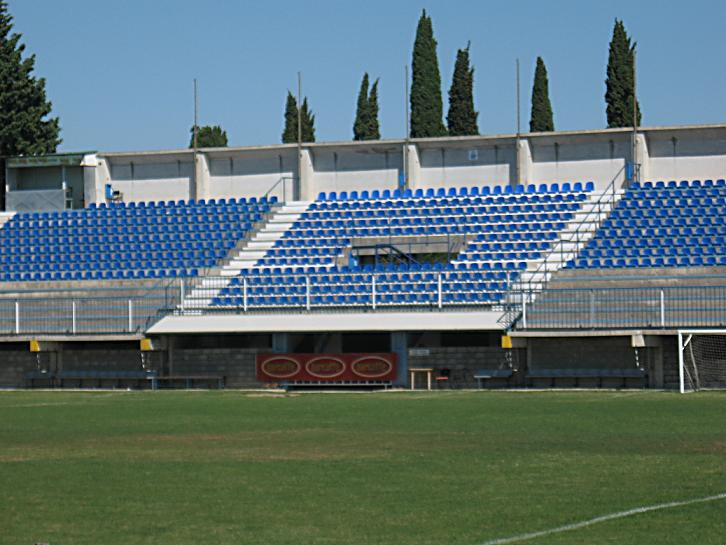
Izola City Stadium

== Honours ==
- Slovenian Third League
  - Winners: 2001–02
- Littoral League (fourth tier)
  - Winners: 2000–01
