= NK Tolmin =

Slovenian football club

Tolmin
- Full name: Nogometni klub Tolmin
- Founded: 1921; 105 years ago
- Ground: Brajda Sports Park
- Capacity: 500
- President: Žan Isakoski Drole
- Head coach: Jan Kragelj
- League: 3. SNL – West
- 2025–26: 3. SNL – West, 4th of 14
- Website: www.nktolmin.si
Home colours	Away colours

Nogometni klub Tolmin (English: Tolmin Football Club), commonly referred to as NK Tolmin or simply Tolmin, is a Slovenian football club based in Tolmin. The club was established in 1921 and competes in the Slovenian Third League, the third tier of Slovenian football. They play their home games at the Brajda Sports Park with a seating capacity for 500 spectators.

== Honours ==
- Slovenian Third League

Winners: 2013–14, 2022–23

- Littoral League (fourth tier)

Winners: 2001–02, 2006–07

- MNZ Nova Gorica Cup

Winners: 2003–04, 2004–05, 2008–09
