= NK Malečnik =

Slovenian football club

Malečnik
- Full name: Nogometni klub Malečnik
- Founded: 1960; 66 years ago
- Ground: Berl Sports Park
- President: Marko Petovar
- Head coach: Marko Lešnik
- League: 1. MNZ Maribor
- 2025–26: 1. MNZ Maribor, 5th of 12
- Website: nk-malecnik.si
Home colours	Away colours

Nogometni klub Malečnik (English: Malečnik Football Club), commonly referred to as NK Malečnik or simply Malečnik, is a Slovenian football club which plays in the town of Malečnik. The club was established in 1960.

== Stadium ==
Malečnik play their home games at the Berl Sports Park. In November 2012, flooding of the Drava river destroyed their football pitch and all the equipment. In a charity campaign organized by the newspaper 7 dni, all the money from the auction was donated to NK Malečnik. Several Slovenian international footballers, including Luka Krajnc, Rene Krhin and Samir Handanović, donated their shirts for the auction.

== Honours ==
- Slovenian Fourth Division
  - Winners: 2000–01, 2004–05
- Slovenian Fifth Division
  - Winners: 1997–98
- MNZ Maribor Cup
  - Winners: 2010–11
