= NK Kamnik =

Slovenian football club

Kamnik
- Full name: Nogometni klub Kamnik
- Founded: 1920; 106 years ago
- Ground: Stadion prijateljstva Mekinje
- League: MNZ Ljubljana League
- 2025–26: Ljubljana Regional League, 13th of 13 (relegated)
- Website: nk-kamnik.si

Nogometni klub Kamnik (English: Kamnik Football Club) or simply NK Kamnik is a Slovenian football club from Kamnik. The club was founded in 1920.

== Honours ==
- Ljubljana Regional League (fourth tier)

Winners: 2007–08

- MNZ Ljubljana Cup

Winners: 2011–12
