= ND Adria =

Slovenian football club

Adria
- Full name: Nogometno društvo Adria Miren
- Founded: 1957; 69 years ago
- Ground: Igrišče Pri Štantu
- President: Tomaž Batistič
- Head coach: Vlado Badžim
- League: 3. SNL – West
- 2025–26: Littoral League, 1st of 11 (promoted)
- Website: ndadria.si
Home colours	Away colours

Nogometno društvo Adria Miren, commonly referred to as ND Adria or simply Adria, is a Slovenian football club based in Miren that competes in the Slovenian Third League, the third tier of Slovenian football. The club was founded in 1957.

== Honours ==
- Slovenian Third Division
  - Winners: 1991–92, 2009–10
- Littoral League (fourth tier)
  - Winners: 2025–26
- MNZ Nova Gorica Cup
  - Winners: 2010–11
