= Dejan Kelhar =

Slovenian footballer (born 1984)

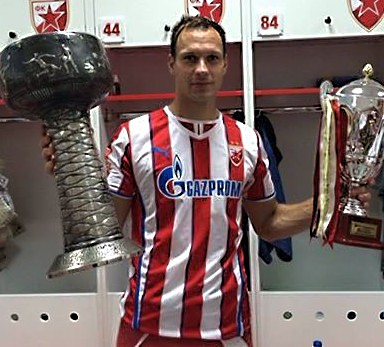

Personal information
- Date of birth: 5 April 1984 (age 42)
- Place of birth: Brežice, SFR Yugoslavia
- Height: 1.88 m (6 ft 2 in)
- Position: Central defender

Youth career
- Brežice
- –2002: Celje

Senior career*
Years	Team	Apps	(Gls)
2003–2004	Celje	12	(0)
2003–2004	→ Krško (loan)	37	(0)
2005	Olimpija	15	(0)
2005–2006	Celje	22	(0)
2006–2007	Greuther Fürth	8	(0)
2008	Celje	31	(2)
2009–2011	Cercle Brugge	42	(1)
2011	Legia Warsaw	2	(0)
2011–2012	Hapoel Haifa	9	(0)
2012	Samsunspor	14	(0)
2012–2013	Gabala	34	(1)
2014	Red Star Belgrade	15	(0)
2014–2015	Sheffield Wednesday	0	(0)
2015–2017	Olimpija Ljubljana	50	(4)
2017	→ Sivasspor (loan)	2	(0)
2017	→ Celje (loan)	7	(0)
2018	FC Bad Radkersburg	15	(0)
2021	SV Übelbach	0	(0)

International career
2001	Slovenia U17	11	(0)
2003–2005	Slovenia U20	8	(0)
2004–2006	Slovenia U21	9	(0)
2010–2013	Slovenia	6	(0)
- * Club domestic league appearances and goals

Dejan Kelhar (born 5 April 1984) is a Slovenian former professional footballer who played as a defender.

== Club career ==
Kelhar started playing football with Brežice, until he moved to Celje. He played there for two seasons in the Slovenian PrvaLiga, the top level of Slovenian football. At the same time he also played for the Slovenian Second League side Krško, because the Football Association of Slovenia regulations allowed to register youth players for two clubs from different league levels.

In 2006, Kelhar transferred to the 2. Bundesliga side SpVgg Greuther Fürth for an alleged transfer fee of €100,000. His transfer was not a big success and he returned to Celje. On 31 January 2009, the last day before the closing of the winter transfer window, Kelhar signed a contract with Cercle Brugge.

In February 2011, he joined Legia Warszawa on a two-and-a-half-year contract.

In July 2012, Kelhar joined Gabala of the Azerbaijan Premier League on a two-year contract. Kelhar's debut came on 4 August 2012 against Simurq in a game that also saw him score his first goal for the club after 15 minutes. Kelhar went on to play in 28 league and three Cup games for Gabala in his first season. Kelhar appeared seven times for Gabala in his second season before leaving in December 2013.

At the start of February 2014, Kelhar signed a six-month contract, with the option of another year, with Red Star Belgrade.

On 6 August 2014, Kelhar signed a short-term contract with English Championship side Sheffield Wednesday. Kelhar was released by Sheffield Wednesday at the end of the 2014–15 season, having not made an appearance for the club.

== International career ==
Kelhar made his debut for Slovenia in a friendly match against Qatar on 3 March 2010. His final international was a September 2013 World Cup qualification match against Albania.

== Career statistics ==
=== Club ===
As of 1 July 2017

Appearances and goals by club, season and competition
Season	Club	League	League		National cup		League cup		Other		Total	
Season	Club	League	App	Goals	App	Goals	App	Goals	App	Goals	App	Goals
Slovenia			League		Slovenian Cup		League cup		Continental		Total	
2002–03	Krško	2. SNL	7	0	0	0	—				7	0
2003–04	Krško	2. SNL	25	0	1	0	—				26	0
2003–04	Celje	Slovenian PrvaLiga	6	0	0	0	—				6	0
2004–05	Celje	Slovenian PrvaLiga	6	0	1	0	—				7	0
2004–05	Krško	2. SNL	5	0	0	0	—				5	0
2004–05	Olimpija	Slovenian PrvaLiga	15	0	0	0	—				15	0
2005–06	Celje	Slovenian PrvaLiga	22	0	4	0	—				26	0
Germany			League		DFB-Pokal		DFL-Supercup		Continental		Total	
2006–07	SpVgg Greuther Fürth	2. Bundesliga	8	0	0	0	0	0	—		8	0
Slovenia			League		Slovenian Cup		League cup		Continental		Total	
2007–08	Celje	Slovenian PrvaLiga	13	0	0	0	0	0	—		13	0
2008–09	Celje	Slovenian PrvaLiga	18	2	1	0	0	0	—		19	2
Belgium			League		Belgian Cup		League cup		Continental		Total	
2008–09	Cercle Brugge	Belgian First Division	7	0	0	0	0	0	—		7	0
2009–10	Cercle Brugge	Belgian Pro League	26	1	6	0	0	0	—		32	1
2010–11	Cercle Brugge	Belgian Pro League	9	0	1	0	0	0	3	0	13	0
Poland			League		Polish Cup		League cup		Continental		Total	
2010–11	Legia Warsaw	Ekstraklasa	2	0	1	0	0	0	—		3	0
Israel			League		Israel State Cup		Toto Cup		Continental		Total	
2011–12	Hapoel Haifa	Israeli Premier League	9	0	0	0	0	0	—		9	0
Turkey			League		Turkish Cup		League cup		Continental		Total	
2011–12	Samsunspor	Süper Lig	14	0	1	0	—		—		15	0
Azerbaijan			League		Azerbaijan Cup		League cup		Continental		Total	
2012–13	Gabala	Azerbaijan Premier League	28	1	3	0	—		—		31	1
2013–14	Gabala	Azerbaijan Premier League	6	0	0	0	—		—		6	0
Serbia			League		Serbian Cup		League cup		Continental		Total	
2013–14	Red Star Belgrade	Serbian SuperLiga	15	0	0	0	—		—		15	0
England			League		FA Cup		EFL Cup		Continental		Total	
2014–15	Sheffield Wednesday	Championship	0	0	0	0	0	0	—		0	0
Slovenia			League		Slovenian Cup		League cup		Continental		Total	
2015–16	Olimpija Ljubljana	Slovenian PrvaLiga	31	2	1	0	—				32	2
2016–17	Olimpija Ljubljana	Slovenian PrvaLiga	19	2	2	0	—		2	1	23	3
Turkey			League		Turkish Cup		League cup		Continental		Total	
2016–17	Sivasspor	TFF First League	2	0	0	0	—				2	0
Total			293	8	22	0	0	0	5	1	320	9

=== International ===
Appearances and goals by national team and year
National team	Year	Apps	Goals
Slovenia	2010	1	0
Slovenia	2011	0	0
Slovenia	2012	3	0
Slovenia	2013	2	0
Total		6	0

== Honours ==
Legia Warsaw

- Polish Cup: 2009–10

Red Star

- Serbian SuperLiga: 2013–14

Olimpija Ljubljana

- Slovenian PrvaLiga: 2015–16
