= 1991–92 Slovenian Football Cup =

Tournament details
- Country: Slovenia

Final positions
- Champions: Maribor (1st title)
- Runners-up: Olimpija

The 1991–92 Slovenian Football Cup was the first season of the Slovenian Football Cup, Slovenia's football knockout competition, and the last that was played by the old rules from SR Slovenia. All Slovenian clubs competed in their regional MNZ Cups, with eight winners securing their place in the quarter-finals of the Slovenian Cup. From there on clubs played by the East/West system to the final.

== MNZ Cup Finals (round of 16) ==
Team 1	Score	Team 2
MNZ Ljubljana
Olimpija	0–0 (4–1 p)	Slovan
MNZ Maribor
Dravograd	1–2	Maribor
MNZ Lendava and MNZ Murska Sobota
Nafta Lendava	2–0	Beltinci
MNZ Koper
Jadran Dekani	0–0 (4–2 p)	Koper
MNZ Celje
Celje	0–2	Rudar Velenje
MNZ Nova Gorica
Primorje	1–0	Gorica
MNZ Kranj
Škofja Loka	1–5	Triglav Kranj
MNZ Ptuj
Aluminij	3–1	Videm

== Quarter-finals ==
The quarter-finals took place on 27 May 1992.

East

27 May 1992	Maribor	3–0	Rudar Velenje	Maribor
17:00 UTC+2	Šimundža 4'; Sušić 40'; Emeršič 77'			Stadium: Ljudski vrt Attendance: 600; Referee: Sabahudin Vugdalić

27 May 1992	Aluminij	1–2	Nafta Lendava	Kidričevo
17:00 UTC+2	Jerenko 28'		Šabjan 13'; Hranilović 75'	Stadium: Aluminij Stadium; Attendance: 400; Referee: Vili Kranjc

West

27 May 1992	Triglav Kranj	0–1	Olimpija	Kranj
17:00 UTC+2			Valentinčič 47'	Stadium: Stanko Mlakar Stadium; Attendance: 1,500; Referee: Žarko Hvalič

27 May 1992	Primorje	2–0	Jadran Dekani	Ajdovščina
17:00 UTC+2				Stadium: Ajdovščina City Stadium

== Semi-finals ==
The semi-finals took place on 10 June 1992.

East

10 June 1992	Nafta Lendava	0–1	Maribor	Lendava
			Šimundža 78'	Stadium: Nafta Field; Attendance: 800; Referee: Zlatko Rauković

West

10 June 1992	Olimpija	4–0	Primorje	Ljubljana
	Topić 11', 20'; Podgajski 25' (pen.); Muniši 85'			Stadium: Bežigrad Stadium; Attendance: 500; Referee: Darko Jamšek

== Final ==
24 June 1992
19:30 CEST

Olimpija	0–0 (a.e.t.)	Maribor
Penalties
Ubavič (penalty missed); Podgajski (penalty scored); Milinovič (penalty scored); Djuranović (penalty missed); Perica (penalty scored)	3–4	(penalty scored) Sušić; (penalty scored) Gajser; (penalty missed) Lukič; (penalty scored) Šimundža; (penalty scored) Hadžialagić

Bežigrad Stadium, Ljubljana
Attendance: 2,000
Referee: Anton Beton
