= Branko Ilić =

Slovenian footballer (born 1983)

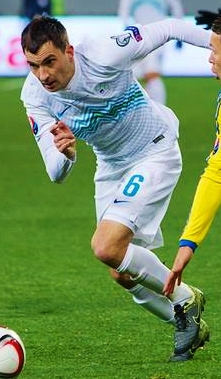
- Ilić in 2015

Personal information
- Full name: Branko Ilić
- Date of birth: 6 February 1983 (age 43)
- Place of birth: Ljubljana, SFR Yugoslavia
- Height: 1.85 m (6 ft 1 in)
- Position: Defender

Youth career
- Grosuplje
- –2002: Olimpija

Senior career*
| Years | Team | Apps | (Gls) |
| 2001–2004 | Olimpija | 55 | (0) |
| 2002 | → Grosuplje (loan) | 13 | (2) |
| 2005–2007 | Domžale | 63 | (2) |
| 2007 | → Betis (loan) | 13 | (0) |
| 2007–2010 | Betis | 21 | (0) |
| 2009 | → FC Moscow (loan) | 6 | (0) |
| 2010–2011 | Lokomotiv Moscow | 11 | (0) |
| 2012–2013 | Anorthosis | 26 | (1) |
| 2013–2014 | Hapoel Tel Aviv | 29 | (1) |
| 2014–2015 | Partizan | 27 | (4) |
| 2015 | Astana | 9 | (0) |
| 2016–2017 | Urawa Red Diamonds | 0 | (0) |
| 2017–2019 | Olimpija | 41 | (0) |
| 2019 | Vejle | 5 | (0) |
| 2019–2020 | Domžale | 4 | (0) |
| Total | | 322 | (10) |

International career
| 2001 | Slovenia U19 | 3 | (1) |
| 2003–2005 | Slovenia U21 | 9 | (0) |
| 2004–2015 | Slovenia | 63 | (1) |
- * Club domestic league appearances and goals

Branko Ilić (born 6 February 1983) is a Slovenian former professional footballer. Usually a right-back, he also played as a central defender.

In his country, he appeared for Olimpija Ljubljana (two spells), Grosuplje, and Domžale (two stints). He also competed professionally in Spain, Russia, Cyprus, Israel, Serbia, Kazakhstan, Japan and Denmark.

A Slovenian international between 2004 and 2015, Ilić was part of the squad at the 2010 FIFA World Cup.

== Club career ==
Born in Ljubljana, Socialist Republic of Slovenia, Socialist Federal Republic of Yugoslavia, Ilić started his career at local NK Olimpija, where he made his senior debut in 2003 against FC Koper. He joined NK Domžale in January 2005, after his former club went bankrupt.

Ilić was loaned to Real Betis in January 2007, becoming the first Slovenian to play for them. His first official appearance came against city rivals Sevilla FC, in a Copa del Rey quarter-final clash. On 4 February he first appeared in La Liga, providing the assist for Robert's goal in a 2–1 away win at Athletic Bilbao.

After a positive spell, the Andalusian side completed the transfer for €1.5 million in the summer of 2007, but Ilić eventually fell out of rotation in 2008–09 after the signing of S.L. Benfica's Nélson, in a relegation-ending season where he only featured in three matches.

On 6 September 2009, FC Moscow signed Ilić on loan from Betis, for one year. In late January 2010, however, he was released by the latter, immediately joining another Moscow-based team, FC Lokomotiv.

On 13 August 2010, Sky Sports reported that Ilić was on trial in England with Premier League's Blackpool, but nothing came of it. On 5 June 2013, after one season in the Cypriot First Division with Anorthosis Famagusta FC, he and teammate Jürgen Colin signed two-year contracts with Hapoel Tel Aviv F.C. from Israel.

Ilić agreed to a two-year deal with Serbian club FK Partizan on 10 July 2014. The following summer he moved teams and countries again, joining Kazakhstan Premier League champions FC Astana.

On 6 January 2016, Ilić signed for Urawa Red Diamonds from Japan. On 5 February of the following year he returned to his homeland, joining Olimpija Ljubljana.

Ilić signed for Vejle Boldklub in Denmark on 15 January 2019. In July 2020, after a second spell with Domžale, the 36-year-old announced his retirement.

== International career ==
Ilić represented Slovenia at youth level, making his competitive debut for the under-19 team in October 2001 against Greece. He was also capped for the under-21s, playing nine matches in UEFA competitions.

Ilić made his debut for the senior side on 18 August 2004 in a friendly with Serbia and Montenegro. He was included in the squad for the 2010 FIFA World Cup in South Africa, but did not leave the substitutes bench in an eventual group-stage exit.

Overall, Ilić played 63 games for his country, scoring one goal against San Marino in the UEFA Euro 2016 qualifiers (6–0 home victory).

== Career statistics ==
=== Club ===
Appearances and goals by club, season and competition
| Club | Season | League | | | National cup | | Continental | | Total | |
| Club | Season | Division | Apps | Goals | Apps | Goals | Apps | Goals | Apps | Goals |
|---|---|---|---|---|---|---|---|---|---|---|
| Olimpija | 2002–03 | Slovenian PrvaLiga | 13 | 0 | 2 | 0 | — | | 15 | 0 |
| Olimpija | 2003–04 | Slovenian PrvaLiga | 26 | 0 | 1 | 0 | 3 | 0 | 30 | 0 |
| Olimpija | 2004–05 | Slovenian PrvaLiga | 16 | 0 | 2 | 0 | — | | 18 | 0 |
| Olimpija | Total | | 55 | 0 | 5 | 0 | 3 | 0 | 63 | 0 |
| Grosuplje (loan) | 2002–03 | Slovenian Second League | 13 | 2 | 0 | 0 | — | | 13 | 2 |
| Domžale | 2004–05 | Slovenian PrvaLiga | 13 | 0 | 0 | 0 | — | | 13 | 0 |
| Domžale | 2005–06 | Slovenian PrvaLiga | 34 | 2 | 2 | 0 | 5 | 0 | 41 | 2 |
| Domžale | 2006–07 | Slovenian PrvaLiga | 16 | 0 | 1 | 0 | 4 | 0 | 21 | 0 |
| Domžale | Total | | 63 | 2 | 3 | 0 | 9 | 0 | 75 | 2 |
| Betis (loan) | 2006–07 | La Liga | 13 | 0 | | | — | | 13 | 0 |
| Betis | 2007–08 | La Liga | 18 | 0 | | | — | | 18 | 0 |
| Betis | 2008–09 | La Liga | 3 | 0 | | | — | | 3 | 0 |
| Betis | Total | | 21 | 0 | 0 | 0 | 0 | 0 | 21 | 0 |
| FC Moscow (loan) | 2009 | Russian Premier League | 6 | 0 | | | 0 | 0 | 6 | 0 |
| Lokomotiv Moscow | 2010 | Russian Premier League | 1 | 0 | 0 | 0 | — | | 1 | 0 |
| Lokomotiv Moscow | 2011–12 | Russian Premier League | 10 | 0 | 1 | 0 | 2 | 0 | 13 | 0 |
| Lokomotiv Moscow | Total | | 11 | 0 | 1 | 0 | 2 | 0 | 14 | 0 |
| Anorthosis | 2012–13 | Cypriot First Division | 26 | 1 | 2 | 0 | 4 | 0 | 32 | 1 |
| Hapoel Tel Aviv | 2013–14 | Israeli Premier League | 28 | 1 | 1 | 0 | 4 | 0 | 33 | 1 |
| Partizan | 2014–15 | Serbian SuperLiga | 27 | 4 | 5 | 0 | 9 | 0 | 41 | 4 |
| Astana | 2015 | Kazakhstan Premier League | 9 | 0 | 0 | 0 | 12 | 0 | 21 | 0 |
| Urawa Red Diamonds | 2016 | J1 League | 0 | 0 | 0 | 0 | 1 | 0 | 1 | 0 |
| Olimpija | 2017–18 | Slovenian PrvaLiga | 30 | 0 | 4 | 0 | 2 | 0 | 36 | 0 |
| Olimpija | 2018–19 | Slovenian PrvaLiga | 11 | 0 | 1 | 0 | 7 | 0 | 19 | 0 |
| Olimpija | Total | | 41 | 0 | 5 | 0 | 9 | 0 | 55 | 0 |
| Vejle | 2018–19 | Danish Superliga | 5 | 0 | 0 | 0 | — | | 5 | 0 |
| Domžale | 2019–20 | Slovenian PrvaLiga | 4 | 0 | 0 | 0 | 2 | 0 | 6 | 0 |
| Career total | | | 322 | 10 | 22 | 0 | 55 | 0 | 399 | 10 |

=== International ===
Appearances and goals by national team and year
| National team | Year | Apps | Goals |
|---|---|---|---|
| Slovenia | 2004 | 1 | 0 |
| Slovenia | 2005 | 6 | 0 |
| Slovenia | 2006 | 8 | 0 |
| Slovenia | 2007 | 10 | 0 |
| Slovenia | 2008 | 9 | 0 |
| Slovenia | 2009 | 1 | 0 |
| Slovenia | 2010 | 4 | 0 |
| Slovenia | 2011 | 3 | 0 |
| Slovenia | 2012 | 0 | 0 |
| Slovenia | 2013 | 9 | 0 |
| Slovenia | 2014 | 5 | 0 |
| Slovenia | 2015 | 7 | 1 |
| Total | | 63 | 1 |

Score and result list Slovenia's goal tally first, score column indicates score after Ilić goal.

International goal scored by Branko Ilić
| No. | Date | Venue | Opponent | Score | Result | Competition |
|---|---|---|---|---|---|---|
| 1 | 27 March 2015 | Stožice, Ljubljana, Slovenia | San Marino | 6–0 | 6–0 | Euro 2016 qualifying |

== Honours ==
Olimpija

- Slovenian Football Cup: 2002–03

Domžale

- Slovenian PrvaLiga: 2006–07

Partizan

- Serbian SuperLiga: 2014–15

Olimpija Ljubljana

- Slovenian PrvaLiga: 2017–18
- Slovenian Football Cup: 2017–18

== See also ==
- Slovenian international players
