= 2000–01 Slovenian Third League =

Slovenian Third League
- Season: 2000–01
- Champions: Bela Krajina (Centre); Bakovci (East); Ptuj (North); Renče (West)
- Promoted: Bela Krajina; Bakovci; Ptuj; Renče
- Relegated: Dren; Ločan; Goričanka; Kobilje; Rogoza; Kovinar Maribor; Fužinar; Tolmin; Idrija
- Goals scored: 2,185

The 2000–01 Slovenian Third League was the ninth season of the Slovenian Third League, the third highest level in the Slovenian football system.

== League standings ==
=== Centre ===
| Pos | Team | Pld | W | D | L | GF | GA | GD | Pts | Promotion or relegation |
|---|---|---|---|---|---|---|---|---|---|---|
| 1 | Bela Krajina (C, P) | 26 | 19 | 3 | 4 | 73 | 31 | +42 | 60 | Promotion to Slovenian Second League |
| 2 | Factor Ježica | 26 | 19 | 3 | 4 | 78 | 30 | +48 | 60 | |
| 3 | Grosuplje | 26 | 19 | 3 | 4 | 67 | 23 | +44 | 60 | |
| 4 | Britof | 26 | 14 | 3 | 9 | 70 | 55 | +15 | 45 | |
| 5 | Kresnice | 26 | 11 | 9 | 6 | 42 | 30 | +12 | 42 | |
| 6 | Kolpa | 26 | 11 | 7 | 8 | 41 | 28 | +13 | 40 | |
| 7 | Rudar Trbovlje | 26 | 11 | 5 | 10 | 39 | 38 | +1 | 38 | |
| 8 | Dob | 26 | 11 | 3 | 12 | 45 | 40 | +5 | 36 | |
| 9 | Svoboda | 26 | 8 | 9 | 9 | 32 | 34 | −2 | 33 | |
| 10 | Vrhnika | 26 | 5 | 9 | 12 | 28 | 53 | −25 | 24 | |
| 11 | Zarica | 26 | 5 | 7 | 14 | 30 | 51 | −21 | 22 | |
| 12 | Bled | 26 | 4 | 8 | 14 | 28 | 53 | −25 | 20 | |
| 13 | Dren (R) | 26 | 4 | 5 | 17 | 25 | 73 | −48 | 17 | Relegation to Slovenian Regional Leagues |
| 14 | Ločan (R) | 26 | 3 | 2 | 21 | 32 | 91 | −59 | 11 | Relegation to Slovenian Regional Leagues |

(C) Champions; (P) Promoted; (R) Relegated

=== East ===
| Pos | Team | Pld | W | D | L | GF | GA | GD | Pts | Promotion or relegation |
|---|---|---|---|---|---|---|---|---|---|---|
| 1 | Bakovci (C, P) | 26 | 15 | 4 | 7 | 58 | 32 | +26 | 49 | Promotion to Slovenian Second League |
| 2 | Križevci | 26 | 14 | 6 | 6 | 84 | 38 | +46 | 48 | |
| 3 | Črenšovci | 26 | 14 | 4 | 8 | 66 | 45 | +21 | 46 | |
| 4 | Čarda | 26 | 11 | 9 | 6 | 50 | 33 | +17 | 42 | |
| 5 | Kema Puconci | 26 | 12 | 4 | 10 | 46 | 40 | +6 | 40 | |
| 6 | Turnišče | 26 | 11 | 6 | 9 | 39 | 35 | +4 | 39 | |
| 7 | Hotiza | 26 | 11 | 3 | 12 | 50 | 46 | +4 | 36 | |
| 8 | Apače | 26 | 10 | 5 | 11 | 44 | 49 | −5 | 35 | |
| 9 | Veržej | 26 | 9 | 6 | 11 | 37 | 41 | −4 | 33 | |
| 10 | Odranci | 26 | 8 | 9 | 9 | 43 | 42 | +1 | 33 | |
| 11 | Tromejnik | 26 | 8 | 6 | 12 | 43 | 51 | −8 | 30 | |
| 12 | Bistrica | 26 | 8 | 5 | 13 | 36 | 68 | −32 | 29 | |
| 13 | Goričanka (R) | 26 | 5 | 11 | 10 | 38 | 41 | −3 | 26 | Relegation to Slovenian Regional Leagues |
| 14 | Kobilje (R) | 26 | 5 | 4 | 17 | 22 | 95 | −73 | 19 | Relegation to Slovenian Regional Leagues |

(C) Champions; (P) Promoted; (R) Relegated

=== North ===
| Pos | Team | Pld | W | D | L | GF | GA | GD | Pts | Promotion or relegation |
|---|---|---|---|---|---|---|---|---|---|---|
| 1 | Ptuj (C, P) | 26 | 22 | 2 | 2 | 65 | 19 | +46 | 68 | Promotion to Slovenian Second League |
| 2 | Šoštanj | 26 | 15 | 7 | 4 | 59 | 27 | +32 | 52 | |
| 3 | Radlje | 26 | 13 | 4 | 9 | 50 | 35 | +15 | 43 | |
| 4 | Paloma | 26 | 12 | 5 | 9 | 51 | 46 | +5 | 41 | |
| 5 | Krško | 26 | 10 | 9 | 7 | 49 | 33 | +16 | 39 | |
| 6 | Mons Claudius | 26 | 11 | 5 | 10 | 52 | 50 | +2 | 38 | |
| 7 | Zreče | 26 | 8 | 9 | 9 | 29 | 34 | −5 | 33 | |
| 8 | Gerečja vas | 26 | 8 | 6 | 12 | 31 | 49 | −18 | 30 | |
| 9 | Stojnci | 26 | 8 | 5 | 13 | 34 | 40 | −6 | 29 | |
| 10 | Hajdina | 26 | 7 | 8 | 11 | 30 | 40 | −10 | 29 | |
| 11 | Vransko | 26 | 8 | 5 | 13 | 28 | 48 | −20 | 29 | |
| 12 | Rogoza (R) | 26 | 9 | 3 | 14 | 46 | 60 | −14 | 28 (Note: 2 points deducted.) | Relegation to Slovenian Regional Leagues |
| 13 | Kovinar Maribor (R) | 26 | 8 | 4 | 14 | 40 | 56 | −16 | 28 | Relegation to Slovenian Regional Leagues |
| 14 | Fužinar (R) | 26 | 4 | 6 | 16 | 32 | 59 | −27 | 18 | Relegation to Slovenian Regional Leagues |

(C) Champions; (P) Promoted; (R) Relegated

=== West ===
| Pos | Team | Pld | W | D | L | GF | GA | GD | Pts | Promotion or relegation |
|---|---|---|---|---|---|---|---|---|---|---|
| 1 | Renče (C, P) | 19 | 13 | 2 | 4 | 55 | 18 | +37 | 41 | Promotion to Slovenian Second League |
| 2 | Bilje | 19 | 13 | 1 | 5 | 42 | 23 | +19 | 40 | |
| 3 | Komen | 19 | 10 | 2 | 7 | 25 | 26 | −1 | 32 | |
| 4 | Korte | 19 | 9 | 3 | 7 | 39 | 27 | +12 | 30 | |
| 5 | Jadran Dekani | 19 | 7 | 6 | 6 | 25 | 22 | +3 | 27 | |
| 6 | Adria | 19 | 5 | 7 | 7 | 20 | 29 | −9 | 22 | |
| 7 | Ankaran | 19 | 6 | 4 | 9 | 21 | 35 | −14 | 22 | |
| 8 | Ilirska Bistrica | 19 | 5 | 6 | 8 | 21 | 26 | −5 | 21 | |
| 9 | Branik Šmarje | 19 | 5 | 3 | 11 | 23 | 32 | −9 | 18 | |
| 10 | Tolmin (R) | 19 | 3 | 9 | 7 | 22 | 41 | −19 | 18 | Relegation to Slovenian Regional Leagues |
| 11 | Idrija (R) | 10 | 2 | 1 | 7 | 10 | 24 | −14 | 6 (Note: 1 point deducted.) | Relegation to Slovenian Regional Leagues |

(C) Champions; (P) Promoted; (R) Relegated

== See also ==
- 2000–01 Slovenian Second League
