= Vugdalić =

Vugdalić is a Bosnian surname. Notable people with the surname include:

- Muamer Vugdalič (born 1977), Slovenian footballer and manager
- Sabahudin Vugdalić (born 1953), Bosnian footballer and sports journalist
