= 1999–2000 Slovenian Third League =

Slovenian Third League
- Season: 1999–2000
- Champions: Komenda (Centre); Renkovci (East); Dravinja (North); Brda (West)
- Promoted: Komenda; Renkovci; Dravinja; Brda
- Relegated: Belinka; Litija; Slovan; Polana; Bratonci; Laško; Starše; Bistrica; Pobrežje; Izola
- Matches: 681
- Goals: 2,162 (3.17 per match)

The 1999–2000 Slovenian Third League was the eighth season of the Slovenian Third League, the third-highest level in the Slovenian football system.

== League standings ==
=== Centre ===
| Pos | Team | Pld | W | D | L | GF | GA | GD | Pts | Promotion or relegation |
|---|---|---|---|---|---|---|---|---|---|---|
| 1 | Komenda (C, P) | 26 | 18 | 6 | 2 | 75 | 23 | +52 | 60 | Promotion to Slovenian Second League |
| 2 | Bela Krajina | 26 | 18 | 5 | 3 | 56 | 19 | +37 | 59 | |
| 3 | Factor Ježica | 26 | 15 | 2 | 9 | 52 | 33 | +19 | 47 | |
| 4 | Tabor Grosuplje | 26 | 12 | 6 | 8 | 45 | 36 | +9 | 42 | |
| 5 | Kresnice | 26 | 11 | 6 | 9 | 41 | 34 | +7 | 39 | |
| 6 | Belinka (R) | 26 | 11 | 4 | 11 | 36 | 36 | 0 | 37 | Withdrew from the competition |
| 7 | Bled | 26 | 9 | 5 | 12 | 34 | 43 | −9 | 32 | |
| 8 | Rudar Trbovlje | 26 | 9 | 4 | 13 | 36 | 45 | −9 | 31 | |
| 9 | Dob | 26 | 9 | 4 | 13 | 29 | 48 | −19 | 30 (Note: 1 point deducted.) | |
| 10 | Kolpa | 26 | 7 | 8 | 11 | 36 | 47 | −11 | 29 | |
| 11 | Svoboda | 26 | 6 | 8 | 12 | 34 | 39 | −5 | 26 | |
| 12 | Zarica | 26 | 6 | 8 | 12 | 31 | 55 | −24 | 26 | |
| 13 | Litija (R) | 26 | 6 | 6 | 14 | 27 | 44 | −17 | 24 | Relegation to Slovenian Regional Leagues |
| 14 | Slovan (R) | 26 | 5 | 8 | 13 | 28 | 58 | −30 | 23 | Relegation to Slovenian Regional Leagues |

(C) Champions; (P) Promoted; (R) Relegated

=== East ===
| Pos | Team | Pld | W | D | L | GF | GA | GD | Pts | Promotion or relegation |
|---|---|---|---|---|---|---|---|---|---|---|
| 1 | Renkovci (C, P) | 26 | 19 | 7 | 0 | 53 | 19 | +34 | 64 | Promotion to Slovenian Second League |
| 2 | Odranci | 26 | 17 | 2 | 7 | 64 | 28 | +36 | 53 | |
| 3 | Goričanka | 26 | 14 | 7 | 5 | 53 | 27 | +26 | 49 | |
| 4 | Bakovci | 26 | 11 | 6 | 9 | 48 | 33 | +15 | 39 | |
| 5 | Hotiza | 26 | 11 | 3 | 12 | 56 | 49 | +7 | 36 | |
| 6 | Čarda | 26 | 11 | 3 | 12 | 43 | 37 | +6 | 36 | |
| 7 | Križevci | 26 | 10 | 6 | 10 | 48 | 48 | 0 | 36 | |
| 8 | Kobilje | 26 | 10 | 6 | 10 | 50 | 57 | −7 | 36 | |
| 9 | Kema Puconci | 26 | 9 | 8 | 9 | 43 | 48 | −5 | 35 | |
| 10 | Veržej | 26 | 9 | 5 | 12 | 41 | 52 | −11 | 32 | |
| 11 | Turnišče | 26 | 9 | 4 | 13 | 47 | 52 | −5 | 31 | |
| 12 | Tromejnik | 26 | 7 | 7 | 12 | 47 | 56 | −9 | 28 | |
| 13 | Polana (R) | 26 | 5 | 5 | 16 | 29 | 66 | −37 | 20 | Relegation to Slovenian Regional Leagues |
| 14 | Bratonci (R) | 26 | 3 | 5 | 18 | 34 | 84 | −50 | 14 | Relegation to Slovenian Regional Leagues |

(C) Champions; (P) Promoted; (R) Relegated

=== North ===
| Pos | Team | Pld | W | D | L | GF | GA | GD | Pts | Promotion or relegation |
|---|---|---|---|---|---|---|---|---|---|---|
| 1 | Dravinja (C, P) | 26 | 17 | 5 | 4 | 56 | 19 | +37 | 56 | Promotion to Slovenian Second League |
| 2 | Paloma | 26 | 17 | 4 | 5 | 56 | 31 | +25 | 55 | |
| 3 | Zreče | 26 | 12 | 6 | 8 | 52 | 37 | +15 | 42 | |
| 4 | Hajdina | 26 | 11 | 7 | 8 | 37 | 40 | −3 | 40 | |
| 5 | Šoštanj | 26 | 10 | 9 | 7 | 41 | 24 | +17 | 39 | |
| 6 | Fužinar | 26 | 10 | 6 | 10 | 43 | 52 | −9 | 36 | |
| 7 | Krško | 26 | 9 | 8 | 9 | 56 | 37 | +19 | 35 | |
| 8 | Kovinar Maribor | 26 | 10 | 5 | 11 | 43 | 37 | +6 | 35 | |
| 9 | Gerečja vas | 26 | 10 | 5 | 11 | 43 | 46 | −3 | 35 | |
| 10 | Mons Claudius | 26 | 10 | 4 | 12 | 42 | 43 | −1 | 34 | |
| 11 | Laško (R) | 26 | 9 | 6 | 11 | 48 | 59 | −11 | 33 | Relegation to Slovenian Regional Leagues |
| 12 | Starše (R) | 26 | 9 | 4 | 13 | 35 | 43 | −8 | 31 | Relegation to Slovenian Regional Leagues |
| 13 | Bistrica (R) | 26 | 4 | 7 | 15 | 27 | 57 | −30 | 19 | Relegation to Slovenian Regional Leagues |
| 14 | Pobrežje (R) | 26 | 5 | 2 | 19 | 28 | 82 | −54 | 17 | Relegation to Slovenian Regional Leagues |

(C) Champions; (P) Promoted; (R) Relegated

=== West ===
| Pos | Team | Pld | W | D | L | GF | GA | GD | Pts | Promotion or relegation |
|---|---|---|---|---|---|---|---|---|---|---|
| 1 | Brda (C, P) | 27 | 13 | 9 | 5 | 49 | 24 | +25 | 48 | Promotion to Slovenian Second League |
| 2 | Renče | 27 | 12 | 6 | 9 | 50 | 29 | +21 | 42 | |
| 3 | Ankaran | 27 | 12 | 6 | 9 | 37 | 30 | +7 | 42 | |
| 4 | Jadran Dekani | 27 | 8 | 17 | 2 | 28 | 20 | +8 | 41 | |
| 5 | Branik Šmarje | 27 | 9 | 7 | 11 | 26 | 32 | −6 | 34 | |
| 6 | Idrija | 27 | 8 | 9 | 10 | 27 | 31 | −4 | 33 | |
| 7 | Komen | 27 | 9 | 5 | 13 | 33 | 42 | −9 | 32 | |
| 8 | Tolmin | 27 | 8 | 8 | 11 | 26 | 36 | −10 | 32 | |
| 9 | Ilirska Bistrica | 27 | 8 | 6 | 13 | 30 | 51 | −21 | 30 | |
| 10 | Izola (R) | 27 | 7 | 9 | 11 | 33 | 44 | −11 | 30 | Relegation to Slovenian Regional Leagues |

(C) Champions; (P) Promoted; (R) Relegated

== See also ==
- 1999–2000 Slovenian Second League
