= Bojan Jokić =

Slovenian footballer (born 1986)

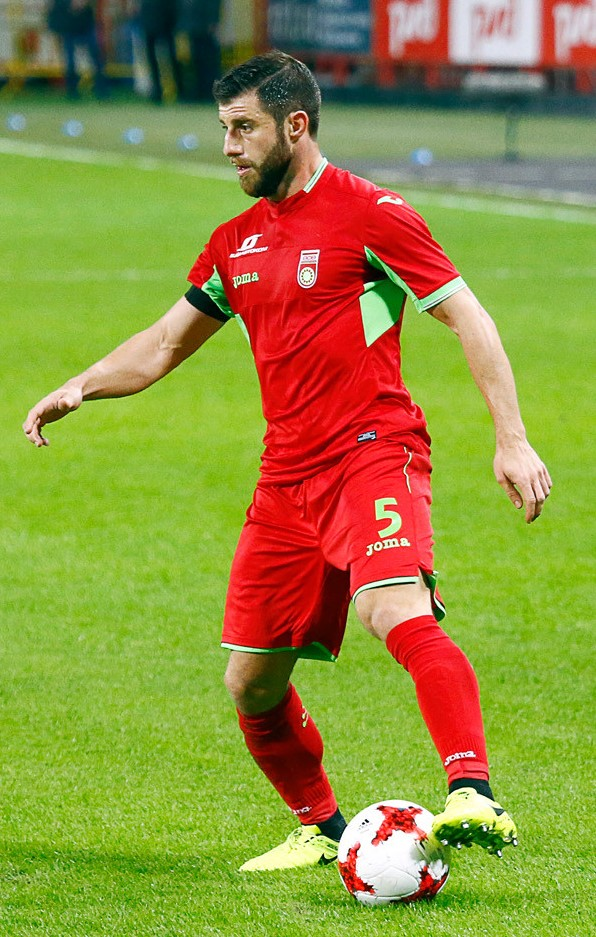
- Jokić with Ufa in 2017

Personal information
- Full name: Bojan Jokić
- Date of birth: 17 May 1986 (age 40)
- Place of birth: Kranj, SFR Yugoslavia
- Height: 1.76 m (5 ft 9 in)
- Positions: Centre-back; left-back

Youth career
- 1994–2002: Kranj
- 2002–2003: Triglav Kranj

Senior career*
Years	Team	Apps	(Gls)
2003–2005	Triglav Kranj	56	(0)
2005–2007	Gorica	65	(1)
2007–2010	Sochaux	42	(0)
2010	→ Chievo (loan)	9	(0)
2010–2013	Chievo	55	(0)
2013–2016	Villarreal	24	(0)
2016	→ Nottingham Forest (loan)	20	(0)
2017–2022	Ufa	122	(3)
Total		393	(4)

International career
2004	Slovenia U18	1	(0)
2005	Slovenia U20	1	(0)
2005–2006	Slovenia U21	8	(0)
2006	Slovenia B	2	(0)
2006–2019	Slovenia	100	(1)
- * Club domestic league appearances and goals

Bojan Jokić (born 17 May 1986) is a Slovenian former professional footballer who played as a centre-back or left-back. Jokić amassed 100 caps with the Slovenia national team between 2006 and 2019.

== Club career ==
Jokić made his senior debut in 2003 with local club Triglav Kranj, and moved to Gorica in 2005. He appeared regularly for the side during his two-year spell, also being a part of the squad which was crowned champions in the 2005–06 campaign.

On 5 July 2007, Jokić moved abroad for the first time in his career, after agreeing to a four-year deal with Ligue 1 club Sochaux. He made his debut in the competition on 11 August, starting in a 3–1 home loss against Le Mans.

On 30 January 2010, Jokić joined Chievo on loan until June. On 22 May, after appearing regularly, he joined the Gialloblu permanently.

On 5 July 2013, Jokić moved to La Liga side Villarreal, signing a four-year deal with the club, after his link with Chievo expired. He made his debut in the competition on 29 September, starting in a 1–0 loss at Real Betis.

On 8 January 2016, Jokić moved to Championship side Nottingham Forest on loan for the remainder of the 2015–16 season. He made his debut on 9 January, as a substitute in the FA Cup Third Round victory over Queens Park Rangers.

On 21 January 2017, Jokić signed a one-and-a-half-year contract with the Russian Premier League side FC Ufa. On 2 August 2018, he scored a late equalizer that made the score 1–1 against the Slovenian club NK Domžale in an away leg of their UEFA Europa League qualifier. As the first leg ended with a score of 0–0, this goal allowed Ufa to advance on away goals rule. It was also the club's first goal in European competition, as they were making their debut on that level.

== International career ==
Jokić made his international debut with the Slovenia national team on 28 February 2006, in a 1–0 win against Cyprus. He featured regularly for the national side, and scored his first international goal on 3 March 2010, scoring the last of a 4–1 victory over Qatar.

On 1 June 2010, Jokić was named among the 23-man squad for the 2010 FIFA World Cup. He appeared in all three matches during the tournament, as Slovenia were knocked out in the group stage.

On 16 November 2019, Jokić played his 100th match for Slovenia against Latvia.

== Career statistics ==
=== Club ===
Appearances and goals by club, season and competition
Club	Season	League			National cup		Continental		Other		Total	
Club	Season	Division	Apps	Goals	Apps	Goals	Apps	Goals	Apps	Goals	Apps	Goals
Triglav Kranj	2003–04	Slovenian Second League	28	0	0	0	—		—		28	0
Triglav Kranj	2004–05	Slovenian Second League	28	0	1	0	—		—		29	0
Triglav Kranj	Total		56	0	1	0	0	0	0	0	57	0
Gorica	2005–06	Slovenian PrvaLiga	31	1	4	0	0	0	—		35	1
Gorica	2006–07	Slovenian PrvaLiga	34	0	3	0	4 (Note: Appearance(s) in UEFA Champions League)	0	—		41	0
Gorica	Total		65	1	7	0	4	0	0	0	76	1
Sochaux	2007–08	Ligue 1	17	0	2	0	1 (Note: Appearance(s) in UEFA Cup)	0	1 (Note: Appearance(s) in Trophée des Champions)	0	21	0
Sochaux	2008–09	Ligue 1	19	0	1	0	—		1 (Note: Appearance(s) in Coupe de la Ligue)	0	21	0
Sochaux	2009–10	Ligue 1	6	0	1	0	—		1	0	8	0
Sochaux	Total		42	0	4	0	1	0	3	0	50	0
Chievo	2009–10	Serie A	9	0	—		—		—		9	0
Chievo	2010–11	Serie A	15	0	3	0	—		—		18	0
Chievo	2011–12	Serie A	20	0	1	0	—		—		21	0
Chievo	2012–13	Serie A	20	0	1	0	—		—		21	0
Chievo	Total		64	0	5	0	0	0	0	0	69	0
Villarreal	2013–14	La Liga	15	0	4	0	—		—		19	0
Villarreal	2014–15	La Liga	7	0	0	0	0	0	—		7	0
Villarreal	2015–16	La Liga	2	0	1	0	4 (Note: Appearance(s) in UEFA Europa League)	0	—		7	0
Villarreal	Total		24	0	5	0	4	0	0	0	33	0
Nottingham Forest	2015–16	EFL Championship	20	0	1	0	—		—		21	0
Ufa	2016–17	Russian Premier League	11	0	1	0	—		—		12	0
Ufa	2017–18	Russian Premier League	26	2	0	0	—		—		26	2
Ufa	2018–19	Russian Premier League	20	0	0	0	6	1	2 (Note: Appearance(s) in relegation play-offs)	0	28	1
Ufa	2019–20	Russian Premier League	15	0	0	0	—		—		15	0
Ufa	2020–21	Russian Premier League	24	1	3	0	—		—		27	1
Ufa	2021–22	Russian Premier League	26	0	1	0	—		2	0	29	0
Ufa	Total		122	3	5	0	6	1	4	0	137	4
Career total			393	4	28	0	15	1	7	0	443	5

=== International ===
Scores and results list Slovenia's goal tally first, score column indicates score after each Jokić goal.

List of international goals scored by Bojan Jokić
No.	Date	Venue	Opponent	Score	Result	Competition
1	3 March 2010	Ljudski vrt, Maribor, Slovenia	Qatar	4–1	4–1	Friendly

== Honours ==
Gorica

- Slovenian PrvaLiga: 2005–06

== See also ==
- Slovenian international players
- List of footballers with 100 or more caps
