= 2001–02 Slovenian Third League =

Slovenian Third League
- Season: 2001–02
- Champions: Grosuplje (Centre); Križevci (East); Krško (North); Izola (West)
- Relegated: Kresnice; Litija; Rakičan; Dobrovnik; Zreče; Gerečja vas; Pobrežje; Postojna; Branik Šmarje; Ilirska Bistrica
- Matches played: 681
- Goals scored: 2,122 (3.12 per match)

The 2001–02 Slovenian Third League was the 10th season of the Slovenian Third League, the third highest level in the Slovenian football system.

== League standings ==
=== Centre ===
Pos	Team	Pld	W	D	L	GF	GA	GD	Pts	Promotion or relegation
1	Grosuplje (C, P)	26	19	6	1	76	19	+57	63	Promotion to Slovenian Second League
2	Šenčur	26	14	5	7	41	24	+17	47	
3	Svoboda	26	13	8	5	45	32	+13	47	
4	Dob	26	13	7	6	58	36	+22	46	
5	Factor Ježica	26	11	7	8	46	32	+14	40	
6	Britof	26	9	12	5	50	38	+12	39	
7	Kamnik	26	10	5	11	27	41	−14	35	
8	Vrhnika	26	10	3	13	30	45	−15	33	
9	Kolpa	26	8	8	10	30	42	−12	32	
10	Bled	26	10	1	15	43	50	−7	31	
11	Rudar Trbovlje	26	9	2	15	25	38	−13	29	
12	Zarica	26	8	4	14	32	54	−22	28	
13	Kresnice (R)	26	7	7	12	32	38	−6	28	Relegation to Slovenian Regional Leagues
14	Litija (R)	26	1	5	20	18	64	−46	8	Relegation to Slovenian Regional Leagues

(C) Champions; (P) Promoted; (R) Relegated

=== East ===
Pos	Team	Pld	W	D	L	GF	GA	GD	Pts	Promotion or relegation
1	Križevci (C, P)	26	17	6	3	66	20	+46	57	Promotion to Slovenian Second League
2	Odranci	26	14	7	5	61	36	+25	49	
3	Turnišče	26	14	7	5	62	41	+21	49	
4	Čarda	26	13	6	7	49	35	+14	45	
5	Črenšovci	26	13	6	7	49	35	+14	45	
6	Veržej	26	8	9	9	46	49	−3	33	
7	Apače	26	8	9	9	36	41	−5	33	
8	Bistrica	26	8	6	12	43	53	−10	30	
9	Tromejnik	26	7	8	11	51	51	0	29	
10	Beltinci	26	5	14	7	30	35	−5	29	
11	Kema Puconci	26	7	8	11	35	47	−12	29	
12	Hotiza	26	7	6	13	32	39	−7	27	
13	Rakičan (R)	26	5	6	15	32	56	−24	21	Relegation to Slovenian Regional Leagues
14	Dobrovnik (R)	26	6	2	18	32	91	−59	20	Relegation to Slovenian Regional Leagues

(C) Champions; (P) Promoted; (R) Relegated

=== North ===
Pos	Team	Pld	W	D	L	GF	GA	GD	Pts	Promotion or relegation
1	Krško (C, P)	26	22	1	3	72	17	+55	67	Promotion to Slovenian Second League
2	Mons Claudius	26	21	2	3	62	21	+41	65	
3	Hajdina	26	12	5	9	39	39	0	41	
4	Stojnci	26	11	6	9	35	40	−5	39	
5	Paloma	26	12	1	13	52	51	+1	37	
6	Bistrica	26	11	2	13	52	53	−1	35	
7	Radlje	26	9	8	9	28	31	−3	35	
8	Šmarje	26	10	4	12	34	39	−5	34	
9	Šoštanj	26	9	6	11	46	42	+4	33	
10	Malečnik	26	8	8	10	31	42	−11	32	
11	Vransko	26	8	6	12	27	43	−16	30	
12	Zreče (R)	26	8	4	14	41	45	−4	28	Relegation to Slovenian Regional Leagues
13	Gerečja vas (R)	26	8	2	16	30	55	−25	26	Relegation to Slovenian Regional Leagues
14	Pobrežje (R)	26	4	3	19	33	64	−31	15	Relegation to Slovenian Regional Leagues

(C) Champions; (P) Promoted; (R) Relegated

=== West ===
Pos	Team	Pld	W	D	L	GF	GA	GD	Pts	Promotion or relegation
1	Izola (C, P)	27	20	5	2	63	18	+45	65	Promotion to Slovenian Second League
2	Bilje	27	13	9	5	45	22	+23	48	
3	Korte	27	11	7	9	45	37	+8	40	
4	Jadran Dekani	27	10	9	8	37	33	+4	39	
5	Postojna (R)	27	8	9	10	32	45	−13	33	Withdrew from the competition
6	Komen	27	9	5	13	33	37	−4	32	
7	Ankaran	27	7	10	10	34	32	+2	31	
8	Branik Šmarje (R)	27	6	13	8	26	40	−14	31	Withdrew from the competition
9	Adria	27	6	6	15	25	58	−33	24	
10	Ilirska Bistrica (R)	27	5	7	15	23	41	−18	22	Relegation to Slovenian Regional Leagues

(C) Champions; (P) Promoted; (R) Relegated

== See also ==
- 2001–02 Slovenian Second League
