= 1951 Slovenian Republic League =

Slovenian Republic League
- Season: 1951
- Champions: Korotan Kranj
- Relegated: Krim; Železničar Gorica; Jesenice; Triglav Ljubljana
- Matches played: 110
- Goals scored: 415 (3.77 per match)

The 1951 season was the 28th season of the Slovenian Republic League and the sixth in the SFR Yugoslavia. Korotan Kranj have defended the league title from the previous season.

== Final table ==
Pos	Team	Pld	W	D	L	GF	GA	GD	Pts
1	Korotan Kranj	20	10	6	4	53	29	+24	26
2	Branik Maribor	20	12	2	6	49	30	+19	26
3	Kladivar Celje	20	8	8	4	40	32	+8	24
4	Nafta Lendava	20	10	3	7	52	31	+21	23
5	Mura	20	9	5	6	48	36	+12	23
6	Železničar Maribor	20	7	9	4	29	30	−1	23
7	Železničar Ljubljana	20	7	4	9	31	28	+3	18
8	Krim	20	7	4	9	34	41	−7	18
9	Železničar Gorica	20	6	5	9	34	54	−20	17
10	Gregorčič Jesenice	20	4	3	13	25	45	−20	11
11	Triglav Ljubljana	20	3	5	12	20	59	−39	11

== Qualification for Yugoslav Second League ==
24 November 1951

Korotan Kranj	0–2	Rudar Trbovlje

Korotan Stadium, Kranj
1 December 1951

Rudar Trbovlje	0–1	Korotan Kranj

Rudar Stadium, Trbovlje
