= Dražen Žeželj =

Slovenian footballer

Personal information
- Date of birth: 6 February 1976 (age 50)
- Place of birth: Ljubljana, SFR Yugoslavia
- Height: 1.74 m (5 ft 8 1/2 in)
- Position: Forward

Youth career
- Slavija Vevče

Senior career*
Years	Team	Apps	(Gls)
1994–1998	Slavija Vevče	52	(12)
1998–2000	Olimpija	64	(10)
2001	Mura	4	(0)
2001–2004	Ljubljana	60	(37)
2004–2006	Primorje	65	(34)
2006–2007	Panionios	2	(0)
2006–2007	→ Niki Volos (loan)	4	(0)
2007–2008	Domžale	25	(3)
2008	SAK Klagenfurt	14	(1)
2009	Slovan		
2009	Radomlje		
2010–2014	Kamnik		
2014–2017	TSV Grafenstein	74	(13)
2018	SK Kühnsdorf	12	(0)

International career
1997	Slovenia U20	2	(0)
- * Club domestic league appearances and goals

Dražen Žeželj (born 6 February 1976) is a retired Slovenian footballer who played as a forward.

Žeželj had spells with a number of Slovenian clubs during his career, and also had stints abroad in Greece with Niki Volos and in Austria with SAK Klagenfurt, TSV Grafenstein and SK Kühnsdorf. He was also Slovenian PrvaLiga top scorer in the 2003–04 season.
