= 2001–02 Slovenian Second League =

Slovenian Second League
- Season: 2001–02
- Champions: Dravograd
- Relegated: Bakovci; Tabor Sežana; Pohorje; Elan Novo Mesto
- Matches played: 240
- Goals scored: 772 (3.22 per match)
- Top goalscorer: Matej Rebol (23 goals)

The 2001–02 Slovenian Second League season started on 12 August and ended on 26 May 2002. Each team played a total of 30 matches. Renče merged with Brda before the season.

== League standing ==
Pos	Team	Pld	W	D	L	GF	GA	GD	Pts	Promotion or relegation
1	Dravograd (C, P)	30	23	5	2	76	24	+52	74	Promotion to Slovenian PrvaLiga
2	Ljubljana (P)	30	22	6	2	89	12	+77	72	Promotion to Slovenian PrvaLiga
3	Aluminij	30	22	5	3	73	22	+51	71	
4	Livar	30	16	9	5	66	32	+34	57	
5	Drava Ptuj	30	15	6	9	57	36	+21	51	
6	Bela Krajina	30	14	6	10	65	40	+25	48	
7	Dravinja	30	10	13	7	37	24	+13	43	
8	Jadran Hrpelje-Kozina	30	12	5	13	46	44	+2	41	
9	Nafta Lendava	30	11	6	13	46	52	−6	39	
10	Železničar Maribor	30	11	6	13	37	44	−7	39	
11	Zagorje	30	10	7	13	36	45	−9	37	
12	Renče – Goriška Brda	30	10	3	17	33	61	−28	33	
13	Bakovci (R)	30	7	3	20	29	85	−56	24	Relegation to Slovenian Third League
14	Tabor Sežana (R)	30	6	5	19	31	73	−42	23	Relegation to Slovenian Third League
15	Pohorje (R)	30	4	3	23	36	73	−37	15	Relegation to Slovenian Third League
16	Elan Novo Mesto (R)	30	2	2	26	15	105	−90	8	Relegation to Slovenian Third League

Source: NZS archive (in Slovene)
Rules for classification: 1) points; 2) goal difference; 3) number of goals scored.
(C) Champions; (P) Promoted; (R) Relegated

== See also ==
- 2001–02 Slovenian PrvaLiga
- 2001–02 Slovenian Third League
