= 1998–99 Slovenian Third League =

Slovenian Third League
- Season: 1998–99
- Champions: Livar (Centre); Črenšovci (East); Rogoza (North); Korte (West)
- Relegated: Britof; Sava Kranj; Moravče; Lakoš; Panonija Gaberje; Brunšvik; Kungota; Bilje; Koštabona

The 1998–99 Slovenian Third League was the seventh season of the Slovenian Third League, the third highest level in the Slovenian football system.

== League standings ==
=== Centre ===
Pos	Team	Pld	W	D	L	GF	GA	GD	Pts	Promotion or relegation
1	Livar (C, P)	26	21	4	1	82	28	+54	67	Promotion to Slovenian Second League
2	Kolpa	26	15	6	5	65	34	+31	51	
3	Svoboda	26	14	5	7	78	50	+28	47	
4	Arne Tabor 69	26	12	5	9	45	43	+2	41	
5	Bled	26	11	4	11	50	49	+1	37	
6	Dob	26	11	4	11	49	56	−7	37	
7	Komenda	26	10	6	10	45	44	+1	36	
8	Belinka	26	8	10	8	36	30	+6	34	
9	Kresnice	26	9	7	10	29	43	−14	34	
10	Litija	26	9	6	11	41	43	−2	33	
11	Zarica	26	8	6	12	43	58	−15	30	
12	Britof (R)	26	7	6	13	30	44	−14	27	Relegation to Slovenian Regional Leagues
13	Sava Kranj (R)	26	4	5	17	39	70	−31	16 (Note: 1 points deducted.)	Relegation to Slovenian Regional Leagues
14	Moravče (R)	26	4	4	18	21	61	−40	16	Relegation to Slovenian Regional Leagues

(C) Champions; (P) Promoted; (R) Relegated

=== East ===
Pos	Team	Pld	W	D	L	GF	GA	GD	Pts	Promotion or relegation
1	Črenšovci (C, P)	26	17	5	4	56	28	+28	56	Promotion to Slovenian Second League
2	Veržej	26	16	6	4	54	26	+28	54	
3	Bakovci	26	15	6	5	68	29	+39	51	
4	Renkovci	26	15	6	5	48	20	+28	51	
5	Kema Puconci	26	12	8	6	49	33	+16	44	
6	Goričanka	26	13	3	10	48	39	+9	42	
7	Kobilje	26	11	3	12	37	40	−3	36	
8	Turnišče	26	9	7	10	36	47	−11	34	
9	Čarda	26	10	3	13	38	47	−9	33	
10	Bratonci	26	9	6	11	35	45	−10	33	
11	Odranci	26	9	4	13	41	43	−2	31	
12	Polana	26	5	6	15	24	63	−39	21	
13	Lakoš (R)	26	3	4	19	33	60	−27	13	Relegation to Slovenian Regional Leagues
14	Panonija Gaberje (R)	26	3	3	20	24	71	−47	12	Relegation to Slovenian Regional Leagues

(C) Champions; (P) Promoted; (R) Relegated

=== North ===
Pos	Team	Pld	W	D	L	GF	GA	GD	Pts	Promotion or relegation
1	Rogoza (C, P)	26	19	4	3	61	20	+41	61	Promotion to Slovenian Second League
2	Paloma	26	13	10	3	60	30	+30	49	
3	Šoštanj	26	13	7	6	50	32	+18	46	
4	Zreče	26	10	11	5	42	21	+21	41	
5	Starše	26	10	10	6	50	32	+18	40	
6	Laško	26	11	5	10	39	33	+6	38	
7	Kovinar Maribor	26	9	9	8	34	28	+6	36	
8	Hajdina	26	8	10	8	32	39	−7	34	
9	Pobrežje	26	9	6	11	35	39	−4	33	
10	Dravinja	26	8	6	12	33	37	−4	30	
11	Gerečja vas	26	9	2	15	37	49	−12	29	
12	Mons Claudius	26	7	5	14	39	67	−28	26	
13	Brunšvik (R)	26	6	5	15	26	56	−30	23	Relegation to Slovenian Regional Leagues
14	Kungota (R)	26	3	4	19	23	78	−55	13	Relegation to Slovenian Regional Leagues

(C) Champions; (P) Promoted; (R) Relegated

=== West ===
Pos	Team	Pld	W	D	L	GF	GA	GD	Pts	Promotion or relegation
1	Korte (C, P)	27	14	9	4	50	27	+23	51	Promotion to Slovenian Second League
2	Idrija	27	14	9	4	37	19	+18	51	
3	Branik Šmarje	27	13	6	8	51	32	+19	45	
4	Jadran Dekani	27	11	7	9	40	26	+14	40	
5	Brda	27	11	7	9	43	30	+13	40	
6	Tolmin	27	8	11	8	38	33	+5	35	
7	Ilirska Bistrica	27	10	5	12	31	41	−10	35	
8	Ankaran	27	8	6	13	38	47	−9	30	
9	Bilje (R)	27	7	7	13	30	42	−12	28	Relegation to Slovenian Regional Leagues
10	Koštabona (R)	27	4	3	20	14	75	−61	15	Relegation to Slovenian Regional Leagues

(C) Champions; (P) Promoted; (R) Relegated

== See also ==
- 1998–99 Slovenian Second League
