= List of Slovenia international footballers =

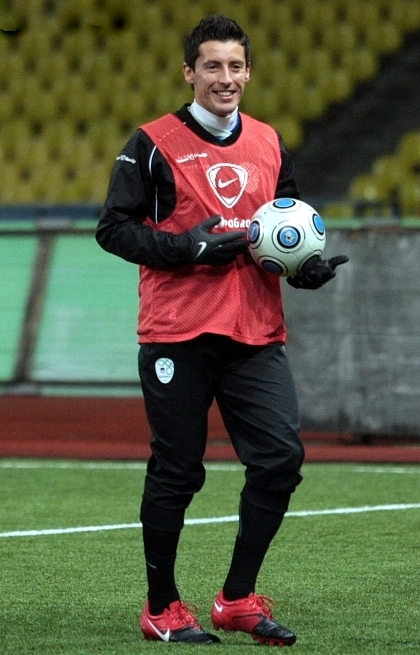
Robert Koren, captain of Slovenia at their most recent World Cup appearance in 2010.

The Slovenia national football team (Slovene: Slovenska nogometna reprezentanca) represents the nation of Slovenia in international association football. The team is controlled by the Football Association of Slovenia (NZS), the nation's governing body for football, and is a member of both the European football federation, UEFA, and the world football association, FIFA.

Prior to Slovenia's independence from the Socialist Federal Republic of Yugoslavia in June 1991, the unofficial Slovenian national team played several friendly matches. A year after gaining independence, in 1992, Slovenia was admitted to FIFA and played its first officially recognised match on 3 June 1992, a friendly against Estonia in Tallinn. In the game, ending in a 1–1 draw, Igor Benedejčič became the first goalscorer for Slovenia after equalizing in the second half. Their first competitive match was a UEFA Euro 1996 qualifier against Italy in September 1994. Slovenia have qualified for a major tournament four times, twice for the FIFA World Cup (2002 and 2010) and twice for the UEFA European Championship (2000 and 2024). Slovenia is also one of the smallest countries by population to ever qualify for the World Cup. As of November 2026, Slovenia have played a total of 321 official matches, winning 117, drawing 88 and losing 116.

Since 1992, 244 players have represented the national team in official matches. The most capped player is Boštjan Cesar, who has made 101 appearances between 2003 and 2018. Zlatko Zahovič is the all-time top goalscorer with 35 goals in his international career, which spanned 13 years between 1992 and 2004. The player with the most appearances as the team captain is Jan Oblak, who captained Slovenia in 66 matches. Tian Nai Koren is the youngest player to appear for the national team; he was 16 years and 308 days old at the time of his debut in June 2026.

== Key ==
- The list is initially ordered by alphabetical order of surname.
- Only players with at least ten appearances in official matches are listed.
- Statistics are correct as of the match played on 16 November 2026.

Positions key (Note: For more information, see formation.)
GK	Goalkeeper
DF	Defender
MF	Midfielder
FW	Forward

Position
Playing positions are listed according to the player profiles on the Football Association of Slovenia official website.
Total appearances and goals
Appearances and goals are composed of FIFA World Cup, UEFA European Championship and UEFA Nations League matches and each competition's associated qualification matches, as well as numerous international friendly tournaments and matches.

Key
Symbol	Meaning
*	National team record

== Players ==
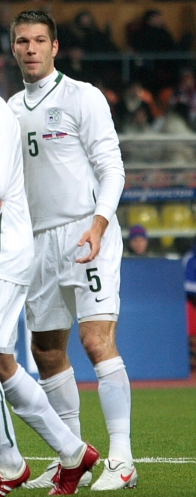
Boštjan Cesar is the all-time most capped player for Slovenia with 101 appearances between 2003 and 2018.

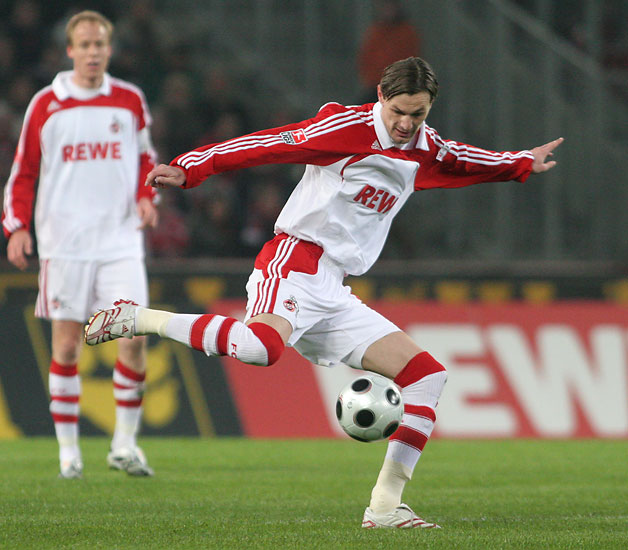
Milivoje Novaković (80 appearances, 32 goals) is the most capped forward for Slovenia and the second best goalscorer behind Zlatko Zahovič.

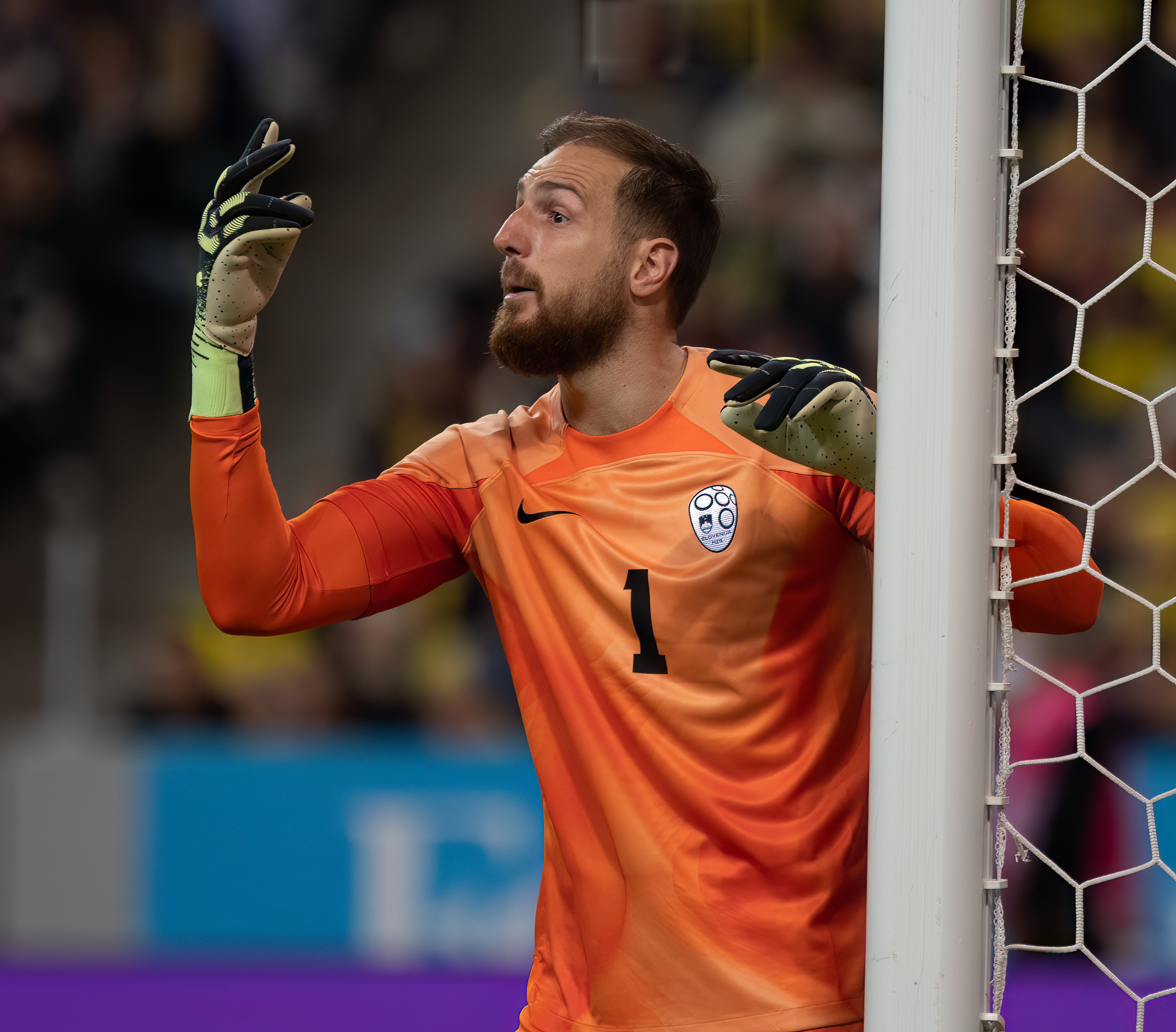
Goalkeeper Jan Oblak has captained Slovenia in the most matches (66), and is also the most capped goalkeeper of all time.

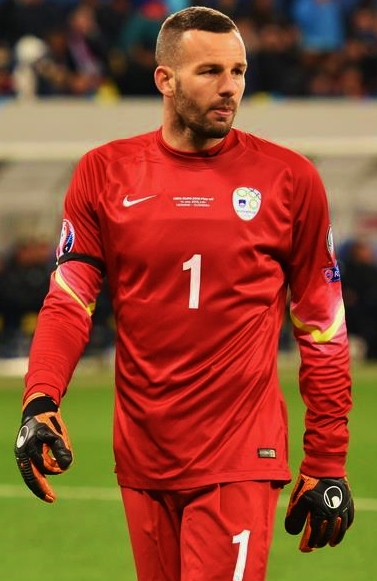
Samir Handanović was the most capped goalkeeper for Slovenia until 2025, when he was surpassed by Jan Oblak.

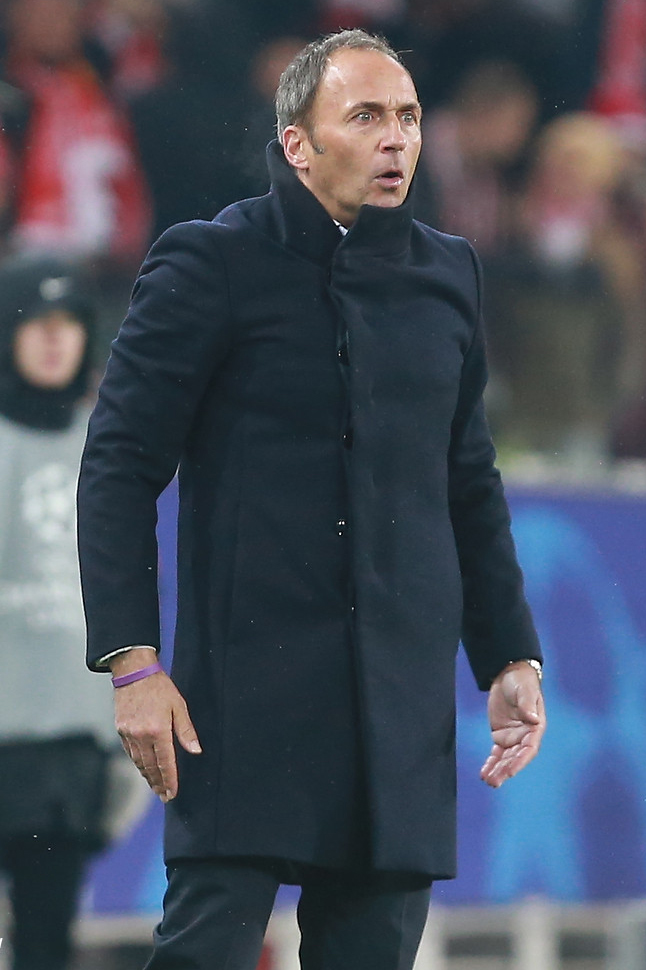
Prior to debuting for Slovenia in 1992, Darko Milanič earned five appearances for the Yugoslavia national team.

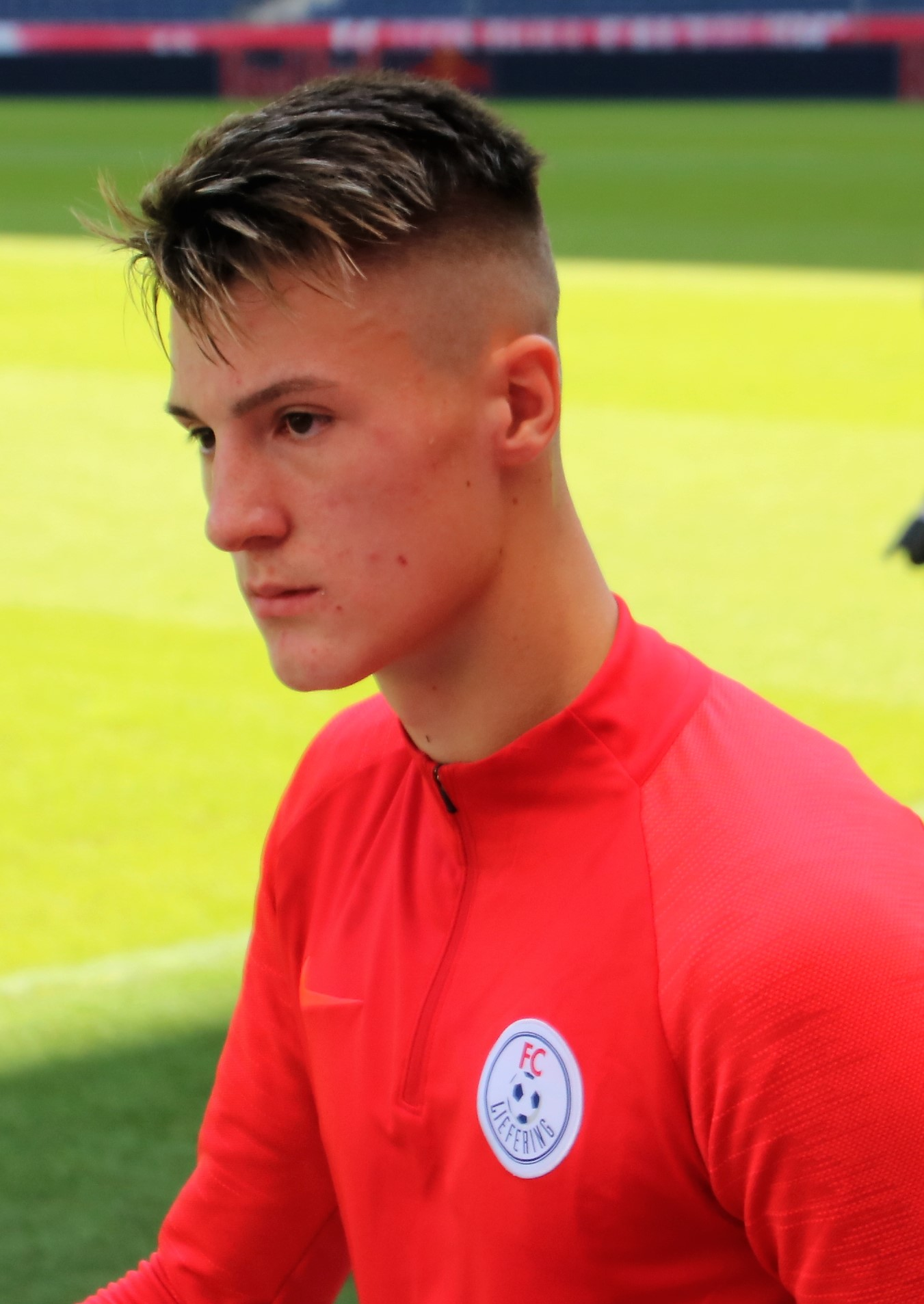
Benjamin Šeško, the youngest player to score for Slovenia.

Table of Slovenia players, with appearance details and statistics
Player	Position	First match	Last match	Appearances	Goals	Notes
Milenko Ačimovič	MF	1998	2007	74	13	
Armin Bačinović	MF	2009	2013	13	0	
Jure Balkovec	DF	2018	2026	40	0	
Vid Belec	GK	2014	2024	21	0	
Robert Berić	FW	2012	2019	25	2	
Roman Bezjak	FW	2013	2019	33	5	
Jaka Bijol	DF	2018	2026	78	1	
Peter Binkovski	MF	1994	1996	16	1	
Valter Birsa	MF	2006	2018	90	7	
Miha Blažič	DF	2018	2024	32	0	
Damjan Bohar	MF	2014	2021	16	1	
Boško Boškovič	GK	1993	1998	27	0	
Mišo Brečko	DF	2004	2015	77	0	
David Brekalo	DF	2022	2026	32	1	
Spasoje Bulajič	DF	1998	2004	26	1	
Aleš Čeh	MF	1992	2002	74	1	(Note: Captained Slovenia in at least ten games.)
Nastja Čeh	MF	2001	2007	46	6	
Žan Celar	FW	2021	2026	21	0	
Boštjan Cesar	DF	2003	2018	101*	10	
Sebastjan Cimirotič	FW	1998	2005	33	6	
Fabijan Cipot	DF	1999	2007	26	0	
Domen Črnigoj	MF	2018	2022	26	3	
Mladen Dabanovič	GK	1998	2003	25	0	
Zlatko Dedić	FW	2004	2013	49	8	
Vanja Drkušić	DF	2023	2026	35	1	
Timi Max Elšnik	MF	2021	2026	38	2	
Robert Englaro	DF	1992	1999	36	0	
Suad Fileković	DF	2002	2009	14	0	
Matjaž Florijančič	FW	1992	1999	20	1	
Damjan Gajser	MF	1995	1997	11	0	
Saša Gajser	MF	1999	2003	27	1	
Marinko Galič	DF	1994	2002	66	0	
Primož Gliha	FW	1992	1998	28	10	
Adam Gnezda Čerin	MF	2020	2026	57	6	
Jon Gorenc Stanković	DF	2020	2025	33	1	
Samir Handanović	GK	2004	2015	81	0	
Tomi Horvat	MF	2022	2026	15	0	
Branko Ilić	DF	2004	2015	63	1	
Josip Iličić	FW	2010	2024	86	17	
Rudi Istenič	MF	1997	2000	17	0	
Erik Janža	DF	2014	2026	37	3	
Alfred Jermaniš	MF	1992	1998	29	1	
Bojan Jokić	DF	2006	2019	100	1	
Kevin Kampl	MF	2012	2018	28	2	
Amir Karić	MF	1996	2004	64	1	
Žan Karničnik	DF	2021	2026	54	2	
Andraž Kirm	MF	2007	2016	71	6	
Aleksander Knavs	DF	1998	2006	65	3	
Vladimir Kokol	MF	1994	1997	12	1	
Aleš Kokot	DF	2004	2008	10	0	
Andrej Komac	MF	2004	2010	43	0	
Robert Koren	MF	2003	2011	61	5	
Blaž Kramer	FW	2020	2025	10	0	
Rene Krhin	MF	2009	2019	48	2	
Aleš Križan	DF	1992	1998	25	0	
Jasmin Kurtić	MF	2012	2024	96	2	
Klemen Lavrič	FW	2004	2008	25	6	
Dejan Lazarević	MF	2011	2015	20	1	
Zlatan Ljubijankić	FW	2006	2015	48	6	
Sandi Lovrić	MF	2020	2026	50	6	
Tim Matavž	FW	2010	2020	39	11	
Darijan Matić	MF	2006	2012	10	0	
Aljoša Matko	FW	2025	2026	11	2	
Borut Mavrič	GK	2004	2006	18	0	
Matej Mavrič	DF	2002	2011	37	1	
Aleš Mertelj	MF	2012	2015	16	0	
Miha Mevlja	DF	2016	2022	50	2	
Darko Milanič	DF	1992	2000	42	0	(Note: Represented Yugoslavia prior to Slovenian independence.)
Željko Milinovič	DF	1997	2002	38	3	
Jan Mlakar	FW	2021	2025	29	4	
Mitja Mörec	DF	2007	2009	14	0	
Džoni Novak	MF	1992	2002	71	3	
Milivoje Novaković	FW	2006	2017	80	32	
Jan Oblak	GK	2012	2026	90	0	
Milan Osterc	FW	1997	2002	44	8	
Miran Pavlin	MF	1994	2004	63	5	
Zoran Pavlović	MF	1998	2002	21	0	
Nejc Pečnik	MF	2009	2015	32	6	
Dejan Petrovič	MF	2020	2025	13	0	
Jalen Pokorn	MF	2004	2005	12	0	
Andrej Poljšak	DF	1993	1998	15	1	
Aleksandar Radosavljević	MF	2002	2013	39	1	
Ermin Rakovič	FW	2001	2007	15	1	
Rajko Rotman	MF	2014	2018	15	0	
Mladen Rudonja	MF	1994	2003	65	1	
Miral Samardžić	DF	2013	2017	15	0	
Benjamin Šeško	FW	2021	2025	45	16	
Simon Sešlar	MF	1997	2005	19	0	
Gregor Sikošek	DF	2016	2022	11	0	
Ermin Šiljak	FW	1994	2005	48	14	
Marko Simeunovič	GK	1992	2004	57	0	
Mirnes Šišić	MF	2008	2012	15	2	
Nejc Skubic	DF	2016	2021	23	1	
Andraž Šporar	FW	2016	2026	70	13	
Dalibor Stevanović	MF	2006	2015	22	1	
Petar Stojanović	MF	2014	2026	73	2	
Aljaž Struna	DF	2016	2019	21	1	
Andraž Struna	DF	2012	2018	27	1	
Danijel Šturm	FW	2024	2026	16	4	
Goran Šukalo	MF	2002	2011	34	2	
Marko Šuler	DF	2008	2013	39	3	
Sašo Udovič	FW	1993	2000	42	16	
Benjamin Verbič	MF	2015	2026	67	7	
Amedej Vetrih	MF	2017	2021	13	0	
Žan Vipotnik	FW	2023	2026	32	6	
Dare Vršič	MF	2007	2012	13	3	
Haris Vučkić	MF	2012	2021	12	5	
Muamer Vugdalić	DF	1999	2004	27	0	
Luka Zahović	FW	2018	2023	15	0	
Zlatko Zahovič	MF	1992	2004	80	35*	
Miha Zajc	MF	2016	2023	39	8	
David Zec	DF	2024	2026	10	1	
Gregor Židan	MF	1992	1996	19	0	(Note: Played one match for Croatia in 1990.)
Anton Žlogar	MF	1998	2009	37	1	
