= Englaro =

Englaro is a surname. Notable people with the surname include:

- Eluana Englaro (1970–2009), Italian woman who entered persistent vegetative state on January 18, 1992
- Robert Englaro (born 1969), Slovenian footballer
