= 1999–2000 Slovenian Second League =

Slovenian Second League
- Season: 1999–2000
- Champions: Koper
- Promoted: Koper; Tabor Sežana
- Relegated: Drava Ptuj; Črenšovci; Rogoza; Korte
- Matches played: 240
- Goals scored: 695 (2.9 per match)
- Top goalscorer: Milan Emeršič (21 goals)

The 1999–2000 Slovenian Second League season started on 15 August 1999 and ended on 4 June 2000. Each team played a total of 30 matches.

== League standing ==
Pos	Team	Pld	W	D	L	GF	GA	GD	Pts	Promotion or relegation
1	Koper (C, P)	30	22	6	2	76	21	+55	72	Promotion to Slovenian PrvaLiga
2	Tabor Sežana (P)	30	21	6	3	64	13	+51	69	Promotion to Slovenian PrvaLiga
3	Šmartno	30	18	5	7	57	39	+18	59	
4	Aluminij	30	16	7	7	62	32	+30	55	
5	Železničar Maribor	30	16	5	9	47	32	+15	53	
6	Zagorje	30	14	6	10	53	35	+18	48	
7	Krka	30	14	5	11	43	35	+8	47	
8	Livar	30	14	3	13	52	47	+5	45	
9	Triglav Kranj	30	11	5	14	37	42	−5	38	
10	Jadran Hrpelje-Kozina	30	9	10	11	34	37	−3	37	
11	Nafta Lendava	30	9	7	14	34	49	−15	34	
12	Šentjur	30	7	9	14	29	52	−23	30	
13	Drava Ptuj (R)	30	7	8	15	34	47	−13	29	Relegation to Slovenian Third League
14	Črenšovci (R)	30	6	5	19	31	82	−51	23	Relegation to Slovenian Third League
15	Rogoza (R)	30	5	5	20	25	68	−43	20	Relegation to Slovenian Third League
16	Korte (R)	30	2	6	22	17	64	−47	12	Relegation to Slovenian Third League

Source: NZS
(C) Champions; (P) Promoted; (R) Relegated

== See also ==
- 1999–2000 Slovenian PrvaLiga
- 1999–2000 Slovenian Third League
