= 1946–47 Slovenian Republic League =

Slovenian Republic League
- Season: 1946–47
- Champions: Enotnost
- Matches played: 54
- Goals scored: 282 (5.22 per match)

The 1946–47 season was the 24th season of the Slovenian Republic League and the second as part of the country of SFR Yugoslavia. The league champions were Enotnost.

== Final table ==
Pos	Team	Pld	W	D	L	GF	GA	GD	Pts
1	Enotnost (Note: Emerged from Svoboda, Borec and Udarnik during the season, took points of Svoboda.)	18	13	1	4	56	18	+38	27
2	Triglav Ljubljana (Note: Emerged from Železničar, Bratstvo and Partizan during the season, took points of Železničar.)	18	12	2	4	52	20	+32	26
3	Kladivar Celje	18	12	2	4	45	28	+17	26
4	Rudar Trbovlje	18	9	5	4	40	20	+20	23
5	Krim	18	8	1	9	46	48	−2	17
6	Železničar Maribor	18	7	2	9	43	39	+4	16

== Qualification for Yugoslav Second League ==
15 May 1947

Triglav Ljubljana	2–1	Enotnost

ŽŠD Stadium, Ljubljana
18 May 1947

Enotnost	2–1	Triglav Ljubljana

Bežigrad, Ljubljana
19 May 1947

Enotnost	3–1	Triglav Ljubljana

Bežigrad, Ljubljana
