= Sašo Lukič =

Slovenian footballer

Personal information
- Date of birth: 24 April 1973 (age 53)
- Height: 1.73 m (5 ft 8 in)
- Position: Midfielder

Senior career*
Years	Team	Apps	(Gls)
1991–1996	Maribor Branik	149	(4)
1996	Olimpija Ljubljana	10	(0)
1997–2001	Mura	128	(9)
2002	Korotan Prevalje	14	(0)
2002–2007	Gratkorn		
2007–2009	SVL Flavia Solva	34	(7)
2009-2013	SV Feldbach	30	(3)
2013	USV Murfeld Süd	0	(0)
- * Club domestic league appearances and goals

Sašo Lukič (born 24 April 1973) is a Slovenian retired football midfielder.
