= NK Šoštanj =

Slovenian football club

Šoštanj
- Full name: Nogometni klub Šoštanj
- Founded: 1920; 106 years ago
- Ground: Stadion pod Vilo Široko
- President: Roman Kavšak
- League: Intercommunal League
- 2025–26: Intercommunal League, 5th of 8
- Website: nk-sostanj.si
Home colours	Away colours

Nogometni klub Šoštanj (English: Šoštanj Football Club), commonly referred to as NK Šoštanj or simply Šoštanj, is a Slovenian football club from Šoštanj that competes in the MNZ Celje's Intercommunal League, the fourth tier of Slovenian football. The club was founded in 1920.

== Honours ==
- Slovenian Third League

2003–04

- Slovenian Fourth Division

1995–96, 1996–97

- MNZ Celje Cup

1997–98

== League history since 1991 ==
Season	League	Position
1991–93	Did not compete	
1993–94	MNZ Celje (level 4)	3rd
1994–95	MNZ Celje (level 4)	6th
1995–96	MNZ Celje (level 4)	1st (Note: Lost play-offs for Slovenian Third League.)
1996–97	MNZ Celje (level 4)	1st (Note: Won play-offs for Slovenian Third League.)
1997–98	3. SNL – East	7th
1998–99	3. SNL – North	3rd
1999–2000	3. SNL – North	5th
2000–01	3. SNL – North	2nd
2001–02	3. SNL – North	9th
2002–03	3. SNL – North	3rd
2003–04	3. SNL – North	1st (Note: Won play-offs for 2. SNL but couldn't obtain a licence.)
2004–05	3. SNL – East	13th
2005–06	Styrian League (level 4)	2nd
2006–07	Styrian League (level 4)	5th
2007–08	Styrian League (level 4)	5th
2008–09	Styrian League (level 4)	11th
2009–10	Styrian League (level 4)	5th
2010–11	Styrian League (level 4)	2nd
2011–12	Styrian League (level 4)	8th
2012–13	Styrian League (level 4)	2nd
2013–14	Styrian League (level 4)	12th (Note: Styrian League discontinued. Transferred to MNZ Celje league.)
2014–15	MNZ Celje (level 4)	6th
2015–16	MNZ Celje (level 4)	2nd
2016–17	MNZ Celje (level 4)	3rd
2017–18	Did not compete	
2018–19	MNZ Celje (level 4)	5th
2019–20	MNZ Celje (level 4)	4th
2020–21	MNZ Celje (level 4)	4th
2021–22	MNZ Celje (level 4)	4th
2022–23	MNZ Celje (level 4)	5th
2023–24	Did not compete	
2024–25	Did not compete	
2025–26	MNZ Celje (level 4)	5th
