= 1961–62 Slovenian Republic League =

Slovenian Republic League
- Season: 1961–62
- Champions: Olimpija
- Relegated: Kovinar Maribor
- Matches played: 132
- Goals scored: 520 (3.94 per match)

== Final table ==
Pos	Team	Pld	W	D	L	GF	GA	GD	Pts
1	Olimpija	22	20	2	0	84	15	+69	42
2	Slovan	22	14	4	4	44	20	+24	32
3	Rudar Trbovlje	22	13	3	6	62	50	+12	29
4	Ljubljana	22	12	3	7	49	39	+10	27
5	Odred Krim	22	8	5	9	38	44	−6	21
6	Gorica	22	8	5	9	32	40	−8	21
7	Kladivar Celje	22	7	4	11	44	39	+5	18
8	Mura	22	7	3	12	32	58	−26	17
9	Triglav Kranj	22	6	4	12	32	44	−12	16
10	ŽŠD Celje	22	5	6	11	34	51	−17	16
11	Ilirija	22	7	2	13	42	62	−20	16
12	Kovinar Maribor	22	4	1	17	27	59	−32	9
