= 2003–04 Slovenian Third League =

Slovenian Third League
- Season: 2003–04
- Champions: Factor Ježica (Centre); Nafta Lendava (East); Šoštanj (North); Korte (West)
- Relegated: Britof; Jezero Medvode; Alpina Žiri; Kamnik; Bled; Velesovo; Beltinci; Odranci; Tromejnik; Bistrica; Bakovci; Radgona; Čarda; Hotiza; Turnišče; Malečnik; Hajdina; Zreče; Središče; Pesnica; Radlje; Ankaran; Tolmin; Košana; Ilirska Bistrica; Šempas
- Goals scored: 2,470

The 2003–04 Slovenian Third League was the twelfth season of the Slovenian Third League, the third highest level in the Slovenian football system.

- Factor Ježica defeated Korte in a promotion play-offs (0–4, 4–0, 4–1 (pen.)).
- Šoštanj defeated Nafta Lendava in a promotion play-offs (2–0, 0–0), but they did not get the competition licence for the 2.SNL, so Nafta took their place.

== League standings ==
=== Centre ===
Pos	Team	Pld	W	D	L	GF	GA	GD	Pts	Promotion or relegation
1	Factor Ježica (C, P)	26	20	3	3	75	19	+56	63	Promotion to Slovenian Second League
2	Šenčur	26	17	5	4	45	15	+30	56	
3	Jesenice	26	13	5	8	49	49	0	44	
4	Britof (R)	26	13	4	9	50	46	+4	43	Withdrew from the competition
5	Zarica	26	13	3	10	62	52	+10	42	
6	Krka	26	12	5	9	39	27	+12	41	
7	Radomlje	26	12	5	9	70	53	+17	41	
8	Dob	26	12	3	11	48	42	+6	39	
9	Slovan	26	10	5	11	44	51	−7	35	
10	Jezero Medvode (R)	26	10	4	12	37	42	−5	34	Relegation to Slovenian Regional Leagues
11	Alpina Žiri (R)	26	10	2	14	44	52	−8	32	Relegation to Slovenian Regional Leagues
12	Kamnik (R)	26	6	4	16	32	51	−19	22	Relegation to Slovenian Regional Leagues
13	Bled (R)	26	6	2	18	27	62	−35	20	Relegation to Slovenian Regional Leagues
14	Velesovo (R)	26	2	2	22	23	84	−61	8	Relegation to Slovenian Regional Leagues

(C) Champions; (P) Promoted; (R) Relegated

=== East ===
Pos	Team	Pld	W	D	L	GF	GA	GD	Pts	Promotion or relegation
1	Nafta Lendava (C, P)	26	18	2	6	64	31	+33	56	Promotion to Slovenian Second League
2	Tišina	26	16	3	7	57	34	+23	51	
3	Veržej	26	16	3	7	74	32	+42	51	
4	Križevci	26	15	2	9	55	40	+15	47	
5	Beltinci (R)	26	12	6	8	39	36	+3	42	Relegation to Slovenian Regional Leagues
6	Odranci (R)	26	12	4	10	49	41	+8	40	Relegation to Slovenian Regional Leagues
7	Tromejnik (R)	26	11	6	9	50	53	−3	39	Relegation to Slovenian Regional Leagues
8	Bistrica	26	11	4	11	45	36	+9	37	
9	Črenšovci	26	10	4	12	48	44	+4	34	
10	Bakovci (R)	26	10	3	13	38	45	−7	33	Relegation to Slovenian Regional Leagues
11	Radgona (R)	26	10	1	15	34	51	−17	31	Relegation to Slovenian Regional Leagues
12	Čarda (R)	26	9	3	14	36	54	−18	30	Relegation to Slovenian Regional Leagues
13	Hotiza (R)	26	5	4	17	26	71	−45	19	Relegation to Slovenian Regional Leagues
14	Turnišče (R)	26	3	1	22	26	73	−47	10	Relegation to Slovenian Regional Leagues

(C) Champions; (P) Promoted; (R) Relegated

=== North ===
Pos	Team	Pld	W	D	L	GF	GA	GD	Pts	Relegation
1	Šoštanj (C)	26	16	6	4	75	28	+47	54	
2	Paloma	26	15	6	5	66	28	+38	51	
3	Stojnci	26	14	6	6	57	24	+33	48	
4	Malečnik (R)	26	14	3	9	56	45	+11	45	Relegation to Slovenian Regional Leagues
5	Železničar Maribor	26	13	4	9	60	41	+19	43	
6	Šmarje pri Jelšah	26	13	4	9	51	35	+16	43	
7	Bistrica	26	12	5	9	59	37	+22	41	
8	Ormož	26	12	4	10	50	43	+7	40	
9	Hajdina (R)	26	11	4	11	49	49	0	37	Relegation to Slovenian Regional Leagues
10	Pohorje	26	10	5	11	52	49	+3	35	
11	Zreče (R)	26	10	4	12	38	45	−7	34	Relegation to Slovenian Regional Leagues
12	Središče (R)	26	6	5	15	62	66	−4	23	Relegation to Slovenian Regional Leagues
13	Pesnica (R)	26	7	2	17	39	57	−18	23	Relegation to Slovenian Regional Leagues
14	Radlje (R)	26	0	0	26	8	175	−167	0	Relegation to Slovenian Regional Leagues

Source: MNZ Ptuj
(C) Champions; (R) Relegated

=== West ===
Pos	Team	Pld	W	D	L	GF	GA	GD	Pts	Relegation
1	Korte (C)	26	17	6	3	88	29	+59	57	
2	Portorož Piran	26	17	5	4	58	33	+25	56	
3	Jadran Dekani	26	17	3	6	60	33	+27	54	
4	Bilje	26	17	2	7	65	37	+28	53	
5	Adria	26	12	2	12	47	46	+1	38	
6	Ankaran (R)	26	11	4	11	43	42	+1	37	Relegation to Slovenian Regional Leagues
7	Tolmin (R)	26	7	4	15	33	51	−18	25	Relegation to Slovenian Regional Leagues
8	Košana (R)	26	7	2	17	27	58	−31	23	Relegation to Slovenian Regional Leagues
9	Ilirska Bistrica (R)	26	2	4	20	23	77	−54	10	Relegation to Slovenian Regional Leagues
10	Vodice Šempas (R)	18	2	2	14	18	56	−38	8	Relegation to Slovenian Regional Leagues

(C) Champions; (R) Relegated

== See also ==
- 2003–04 Slovenian Second League
