= 2004–05 Slovenian Third League =

Slovenian Third League
- Season: 2004–05
- Champions: Zavrč (East); Šenčur (West)
- Relegated: Križevci; Šoštanj; Bistrica; Bilje; Portorož Piran
- Matches played: 364
- Goals scored: 1,198 (3.29 per match)
- Top goalscorer: Matej Golob (24 goals)

The 2004–05 Slovenian Third League was the 13th season of the Slovenian Third League, the third highest level in the Slovenian football system.

== League standings ==
=== East ===
Pos	Team	Pld	W	D	L	GF	GA	GD	Pts	Relegation
1	Zavrč (C)	26	16	7	3	72	21	+51	55	
2	Paloma	26	17	4	5	54	31	+23	55	
3	Veržej	26	14	6	6	57	25	+32	48	
4	Stojnci	26	14	4	8	65	41	+24	46	
5	Pohorje	26	12	9	5	36	23	+13	45	
6	Ormož	26	10	8	8	44	38	+6	38	
7	Tišina	26	10	6	10	40	35	+5	36	
8	Črenšovci	26	9	7	10	42	51	−9	34	
9	Kovinar Štore	26	8	10	8	37	44	−7	34	
10	Križevci (R)	26	8	6	12	41	49	−8	30	Withdrew from the competition
11	Železničar Maribor	26	8	6	12	35	45	−10	30	
12	Šmarje pri Jelšah	26	6	7	13	29	45	−16	25	
13	Šoštanj (R)	26	4	2	20	28	74	−46	14	Relegation to Slovenian Regional Leagues
14	Bistrica (R)	26	3	4	19	30	88	−58	13	Relegation to Slovenian Regional Leagues

(C) Champions; (R) Relegated

=== West ===
Pos	Team	Pld	W	D	L	GF	GA	GD	Pts	Promotion or relegation
1	Šenčur (C, P)	26	18	2	6	55	28	+27	56	Promotion to Slovenian Second League
2	Radomlje	26	11	11	4	41	34	+7	44	
3	Zarica	26	11	8	7	53	42	+11	41	
4	Jesenice	26	9	13	4	42	30	+12	40	
5	Dob	26	9	11	6	48	35	+13	38	
6	Brda Dobrovo	26	9	10	7	47	35	+12	37	
7	Krka	26	9	7	10	40	51	−11	34	
8	Adria	26	7	10	9	40	41	−1	31	
9	Kolpa	26	8	7	11	40	53	−13	31	
10	Korte	26	8	7	11	45	59	−14	31	
11	Jadran Dekani	26	7	8	11	42	47	−5	29	
12	Slovan	26	5	11	10	28	37	−9	26	
13	Bilje (R)	26	7	5	14	35	46	−11	26	Relegation to Slovenian Regional Leagues
14	Portorož Piran (R)	26	5	8	13	32	50	−18	23	Relegation to Slovenian Regional Leagues

(C) Champions; (P) Promoted; (R) Relegated

== See also ==
- 2004–05 Slovenian Second League
