= Boško Boškovič =

Slovenian footballer (born 1969)

Personal information
- Date of birth: 12 January 1969 (age 57)
- Place of birth: Koper, SFR Yugoslavia
- Height: 1.90 m (6 ft 3 in)
- Position: Goalkeeper

Youth career
- Koper
- FK Partizan

Senior career*
Years	Team	Apps	(Gls)
1990–1991	Primorac		
1991–1992	Hajduk Split		
1992–1993	Koper	30	(0)
1993–1994	Mura	29	(0)
1994–1995	Antalyaspor	31	(0)
1995	Izola	5	(0)
1995–1996	Beltinci	17	(0)
1996–1997	Felgueiras	27	(0)
1997–1999	SC Freiburg	6	(0)
1999–2001	Tabor		
2001–2002	Izola	9	(0)
2002	Gorica	3	(0)
2003	Koper	3	(0)

International career
1993–1998	Slovenia	27	(0)
- * Club domestic league appearances and goals

Boško Boškovič (born 12 January 1969 in Koper) is a Slovenian retired footballer who played as a goalkeeper.

== International career ==
Boškovič made his debut for Slovenia in an April 1993 friendly match against Estonia, coming on as a 75th-minute substitute for Marko Simeunovič, and earned a total of 27 caps, scoring no goals. His final international was an April 1998 friendly against the Czech Republic.

== See also ==
- Slovenian international players
