= 2002–03 Slovenian Third League =

Slovenian Third League
- Season: 2002–03
- Champions: Svoboda (Centre); Čarda (East); Pohorje (North); Korte (West)
- Relegated: Kolpa; Vrhnika; Rudar Trbovlje; Apače; Kema Puconci; Panonija Gaberje; Krško Posavje; Vransko; Fužinar; Mons Claudius; Komen; Cerknica
- Goals scored: 2,192

The 2002–03 Slovenian Third League was the 11th season of the Slovenian Third League, the third highest level in the Slovenian football system.

== League standings ==
=== Centre ===
Pos	Team	Pld	W	D	L	GF	GA	GD	Pts	Promotion or relegation
1	Svoboda (C, P)	25	19	5	1	76	23	+53	62	Promotion to Slovenian Second League
2	Factor Šmartno	25	18	7	0	63	18	+45	61	
3	Šenčur	25	17	5	3	60	19	+41	56	
4	Dob	25	12	4	9	52	37	+15	40	
5	Britof	25	10	5	10	45	48	−3	35	
6	Zarica	25	8	9	8	29	40	−11	33	
7	Kamnik	25	9	5	11	32	35	−3	32	
8	Slovan	25	8	5	12	45	42	+3	29	
9	Bled	25	7	7	11	27	54	−27	28	
10	Kolpa (R)	25	7	5	13	27	49	−22	26	Withdrew from the competition
11	Alpina Žiri	25	6	7	12	36	45	−9	25	
12	Elan 1922	25	7	2	16	34	67	−33	23	
13	Vrhnika (R)	13	2	4	7	16	26	−10	10	Relegation to Slovenian Regional Leagues
14	Rudar Trbovlje (R)	25	1	6	18	24	62	−38	9	Relegation to Slovenian Regional Leagues

(C) Champions; (P) Promoted; (R) Relegated

=== East ===
Pos	Team	Pld	W	D	L	GF	GA	GD	Pts	Relegation
1	Čarda (C)	26	14	6	6	51	32	+19	48	
2	Beltinci	26	14	6	6	62	30	+32	48	
3	Veržej	26	14	2	10	50	46	+4	44	
4	Bistrica	26	11	10	5	43	29	+14	43	
5	Tišina	26	12	7	7	44	35	+9	43	
6	Bakovci	26	11	9	6	47	31	+16	42	
7	Črenšovci	26	11	5	10	46	39	+7	38	
8	Odranci	26	11	4	11	50	42	+8	37	
9	Tromejnik	26	11	4	11	51	49	+2	37	
10	Hotiza	26	11	3	12	44	56	−12	36	
11	Turnišče	26	8	8	10	39	43	−4	32	
12	Apače (R)	26	8	5	13	33	49	−16	29	Relegation to Slovenian Regional Leagues
13	Kema Puconci (R)	26	7	6	13	33	51	−18	27	Relegation to Slovenian Regional Leagues
14	Panonija Gaberje (R)	26	0	3	23	9	74	−65	3	Relegation to Slovenian Regional Leagues

(C) Champions; (R) Relegated

=== North ===
Pos	Team	Pld	W	D	L	GF	GA	GD	Pts	Relegation
1	Pohorje (C)	26	17	4	5	60	30	+30	55	
2	Bistrica	26	15	3	8	48	33	+15	48	
3	Šoštanj	26	13	8	5	58	29	+29	47	
4	Paloma	26	13	7	6	47	37	+10	46	
5	Šmarje	26	13	3	10	41	35	+6	42	
6	Središče	26	12	5	9	58	50	+8	41	
7	Hajdina	26	11	6	9	63	46	+17	39	
8	Radlje	26	11	4	11	36	36	0	37	
9	Stojnci	26	10	6	10	38	23	+15	36	
10	Malečnik	26	9	7	10	44	50	−6	34	
11	Krško Posavje (Note: Before the season start, the newly promoted NK Brežice merged with NK Krško by registering all their players to Krško and competed under the name Krško Posavje. However, the games were played in Brežice.) (R)	26	9	6	11	35	38	−3	33	Relegation to Slovenian Regional Leagues
12	Vransko (R)	26	8	5	13	32	47	−15	29	Relegation to Slovenian Regional Leagues
13	Fužinar (R)	26	3	5	18	31	69	−38	14	Relegation to Slovenian Regional Leagues
14	Mons Claudius (R)	26	1	5	20	24	92	−68	8	Relegation to Slovenian Regional Leagues

Source: MNZ Ptuj
(C) Champions; (R) Relegated

=== West ===
Pos	Team	Pld	W	D	L	GF	GA	GD	Pts	Promotion or relegation
1	Korte (C)	27	17	2	8	60	25	+35	53	
2	Tabor Sežana (P)	27	15	7	5	77	30	+47	52	Promotion to Slovenian Second League
3	Bilje	27	14	6	7	41	21	+20	48	
4	Ankaran	27	12	6	9	34	45	−11	42	
5	Adria	27	11	7	9	50	49	+1	40	
6	Jadran Dekani	27	10	7	10	35	36	−1	37	
7	Portorož Piran	27	8	8	11	31	41	−10	32	
8	Tolmin	27	8	5	14	29	43	−14	29	
9	Komen (R)	27	8	3	16	31	47	−16	27	Relegation to Slovenian Regional Leagues
10	Cerknica (R)	27	4	5	18	21	71	−50	17	Relegation to Slovenian Regional Leagues

(C) Champions; (P) Promoted; (R) Relegated

== See also ==
- 2002–03 Slovenian Second League
