= Muamer Vugdalić =

Slovenian footballer and manager (born 1977)

Personal information
- Date of birth: 25 August 1977 (age 49)
- Place of birth: Rijeka, SFR Yugoslavia
- Height: 1.90 m (6 ft 3 in)
- Position: Defender

Team information
- Current team: Slovenia U19 (manager)

Youth career
- Olimpija

Senior career*
Years	Team	Apps	(Gls)
1995–1998	Olimpija	40	(0)
1998–2001	Maribor	80	(9)
2001–2003	Shakhtar Donetsk	2	(0)
2001–2003	→ Shakhtar-2 Donetsk	6	(0)
2001–2003	→ Maribor (loan)	28	(0)
2003–2004	Domžale	28	(0)
2005–2006	AEL Limassol	12	(0)
2006–2007	Niki Volos		
2007	Interblock	1	(0)
2007–2008	Željezničar	24	(2)
2008–2009	Olimpija Ljubljana	19	(1)
2009–2010	Bela Krajina	6	(0)

International career
1995	Slovenia U18	2	(1)
1997	Slovenia U20	1	(0)
1997–1999	Slovenia U21	12	(0)
1999–2004	Slovenia	27	(0)
2003	Slovenia B	1	(0)

Managerial career
- 2019: Radomlje
- 2019–2020: Drava Ptuj
- 2021–2024: Slovenia U15
- 2024: Slovenia U17
- 2024–2025: Slovenia U16
- 2025–2026: Slovenia U17
- 2026–: Slovenia U19
- * Club domestic league appearances and goals

Muamer Vugdalić (born 25 August 1977) is a Slovenian football manager and former player.

== Club career ==
Born to Sabahudin Vugdalić, Muamer's early years of his career were associated with Olimpija. He made his first team debut in May 1995 against Jadran Dekani. In 1998, he moved to Maribor, with whom he played in the UEFA Champions League group stages in the 1999–2000 season. In 2001, he signed a contract with Ukrainian side Shakhtar Donetsk. After only two league appearances for Shakhtar, he returned to Maribor in December 2001. He stayed there for two-and-a-half seasons. After that, he played for Domžale, AEL Limassol, Niki Volos and Interblock, before he signed a contract with Željezničar in July 2007. After one season in Bosnia and Herzegovina, he returned to Slovenia and signed with Olimpija Ljubljana.

== International career ==
On 9 October 1999, Vugdalić made his debut for the Slovenia national team against Greece. Overall, he made 27 appearances for the team and was a part of the Slovenian 2002 FIFA World Cup squad.

== Honours ==
Olimpija

- Slovenian Championship: 1994–95
- Slovenian Cup: 1995–96

Maribor

- Slovenian Championship: 1998–99, 1999–2000, 2000–01, 2001–02, 2002–03
- Slovenian Cup: 1998–99

Olimpija Ljubljana

- Slovenian Second League: 2008–09
