= Robert Englaro =

Slovenian footballer (born 1969)

Personal information
- Date of birth: 28 August 1969 (age 57)
- Place of birth: Novo Mesto, SFR Yugoslavia
- Height: 1.78 m (5 ft 10 in)
- Position: Defender

Youth career
- Slovan

Senior career*
Years	Team	Apps	(Gls)
1988–1997	Olimpija	202	(9)
1997	Foggia	21	(0)
1997–2000	Atalanta	13	(0)
2001–2002	Ljubljana	5	(0)

International career
- Yugoslavia U21
1992–1999	Slovenia	36	(0)

Managerial career
- 2014: Slovenia U21
- * Club domestic league appearances and goals

Robert Englaro (born 28 August 1969) is a Slovenian former footballer who played as a defender.

== International career ==
Englaro made his debut for Slovenia in the country's first-ever official match against Estonia on 3 June 1992 and earned a total of 36 caps. His final international was an October 1999 European Championship qualification match against Greece.

== See also ==
- Slovenian international players
