= 1950 Slovenian Republic League =

Slovenian Republic League
- Season: 1950
- Champions: Korotan Kranj

The 1950 season was the 27th season of the Slovenian Republic League and the fifth in the SFR Yugoslavia. Korotan Kranj have won the league title for the first time.

== Final table ==
Pos	Team	Pts
1	Korotan Kranj	37
2	Kladivar Celje	34
3	Branik Maribor	32
4	Nafta Lendava	31
5	Krim	29
6	Železničar Maribor	19
7	Mura	18
8	Miličnik Ljubljana	13
9	Železničar Gorica	12
10	Jesenice	11
11	Proletarec	9
12	Drava Ptuj (Note: Drava withdrew after the spring part of the season.)	0
