= Sabahudin Vugdalić =

Bosnian sports journalist and footballer

Personal information
- Full name: Sabahudin Vugdalić
- Date of birth: 16 January 1953 (age 73)
- Place of birth: Srebrenica, PR Bosnia-Herzegovina, FPR Yugoslavia
- Position: Goalkeeper

Senior career*
Years	Team	Apps	(Gls)
1972–1974	Famos Hrasnica		
1974–1975	Iskra Bugojno		
1975–1976	Bor	8	(0)
1976–1977	Rijeka	0	(0)
1977–1978	Rudar Velenje	19	(0)
1979–1980	Olimpija Ljubljana	22	(0)
1981–1982	Gaziantepspor	20	(0)
1983–1984	Napredak Kruševac	4	(0)
- * Club domestic league appearances and goals

Sabahudin "Saša" Vugdalić (born 16 January 1953) is a Bosnian sports journalist and former football goalkeeper who played for clubs in the former Yugoslavia and Turkey.

== Club career ==
Born in Srebrenica, Vugdalić started playing professional football for local side FK Famos Hrasnica. He would play in the Yugoslav Second League for FK Bor and NK Rudar Velenje, before joining Yugoslav First League side NK Olimpija Ljubljana

In 1981, Vugdalić moved to Turkey, joining Süper Lig side Gaziantepspor. He made 20 league appearances in one season with the club.

He will then return to Yugoslavia and finish his career by playing in Second League with FK Napredak Kruševac in 1983–84.

After retiring from playing, Vugdalić became a sports journalist, working for Sarajevo-based Televizija OBN.

== Personal life ==
Vugdalić earned fame for executing a series of dangerous rescues. At age 17, he jumped off a bridge over the Drina to save a drowning 11-year-old. Two years later, he rescued a mother and daughter from a car that had crashed into a ravine in Ivan planina while he was on leave from military duty. Four years later, he saved a mother and her two children who were trapped in a burning vehicle while he was in Zurich.

Vugdalić is the father of former Slovenia international footballer, Muamer Vugdalić.
