= Dejan Djuranović =

Slovenian footballer (born 1968)

Personal information
- Date of birth: 5 May 1968 (age 58)
- Place of birth: Postojna, SFR Yugoslavia
- Height: 1.80 m (5 ft 11 in)
- Position: Midfielder

Team information
- Current team: Triglav Kranj (head coach)

Senior career*
Years	Team	Apps	(Gls)
1989–1992	Izola		
1992–1997	Olimpija	144	(17)
1997	Gorica	11	(1)
1998–2003	Maribor	136	(21)
2003–2006	Domžale	76	(11)
2006–2008	Laktaši		

International career
1992	Slovenia	1	(0)

Managerial career
- 2013–2016: Radomlje
- 2019–2020: Dob
- 2020–2022: Domžale
- 2025–: Triglav Kranj
- * Club domestic league appearances and goals

Dejan Djuranović (born 5 May 1968) is a Slovenian professional football manager and former player.

== Playing career ==
Djuranović made one appearance for the Slovenia national team, namely in the country's first-ever official match against Estonia on 3 June 1992, when he came on as a 59th-minute substitute for Marko Gruškovnjak.

== Managerial career ==
In June 2013, Djuranović was appointed manager of the Slovenian Second League side Radomlje.
