= 2002–03 Slovenian Second League =

Slovenian Second League
- Season: 2002–03
- Champions: Domžale
- Promoted: Domžale; Drava Ptuj
- Relegated: Grosuplje; Jadran Hrpelje-Kozina; Nafta Lendava; Križevci; Železničar Maribor
- Matches played: 240
- Goals scored: 731 (3.05 per match)
- Top goalscorer: Matjaž Majcen (26 goals)

The 2002–03 Slovenian Second League season started on 11 August 2002 and ended on 15 June 2003. Each team played a total of 30 matches.

== League standing ==
Pos	Team	Pld	W	D	L	GF	GA	GD	Pts	Promotion or relegation
1	Domžale (C, P)	30	23	5	2	81	28	+53	74	Promotion to Slovenian PrvaLiga
2	Drava Ptuj (P)	30	18	7	5	63	24	+39	61	Promotion to Slovenian PrvaLiga
3	Aluminij	30	17	6	7	67	37	+30	57	
4	Grosuplje (R)	30	17	5	8	59	44	+15	56	Withdrew from the competition
5	Bela Krajina	30	12	11	7	52	39	+13	47	
6	Zagorje	30	10	9	11	49	47	+2	39	
7	Dravinja	30	12	3	15	31	42	−11	39	
8	Triglav Kranj	30	10	8	12	40	42	−2	38	
9	Izola	30	11	5	14	43	52	−9	38	
10	Jadran Hrpelje-Kozina (R)	30	10	7	13	38	43	−5	37	Withdrew from the competition
11	Livar	30	10	6	14	31	44	−13	36	
12	Brda	30	10	5	15	36	51	−15	35	
13	Krško Posavje	30	7	14	9	35	53	−18	35	
14	Nafta Lendava (R)	30	8	6	16	40	61	−21	30	Relegation to Slovenian Third League
15	Križevci (R)	30	8	3	19	43	55	−12	27	Relegation to Slovenian Third League
16	Železničar Maribor (R)	30	4	6	20	23	69	−46	18	Relegation to Slovenian Third League

Source: NZS archive (in Slovene)
Rules for classification: 1) points; 2) goal difference; 3) number of goals scored.
(C) Champions; (P) Promoted; (R) Relegated

== See also ==
- 2002–03 Slovenian PrvaLiga
- 2002–03 Slovenian Third League
