= Sandi Valentinčič =

Slovenian footballer (born 1967)

Personal information
- Date of birth: 25 August 1967 (age 59)
- Place of birth: SFR Yugoslavia
- Height: 1.86 m (6 ft 1 in)
- Position: Midfielder

Senior career*
Years	Team	Apps	(Gls)
1988–1989	Olimpija	5	(1)
1989–1991	Slovan		
1992–1993	Olimpija	38	(7)
1993–1996	Gorica	75	(29)
1996–1997	VfB Oldenburg	14	(1)
1997–1998	Primorje	22	(3)
1998	Korotan Prevalje	9	(2)
1998	Maccabi Jaffa		
1999	Hapoel Jerusalem		
1999–2000	FC Rot-Weiß Erfurt	10	(1)
1999–2000	FC Rot-Weiß Erfurt II	7	(3)
2000–2001	Livar		

International career
1995–1997	Slovenia	6	(0)

Managerial career
- 2010–2011: Primorje
- 2017–2020: Bilje
- * Club domestic league appearances and goals

Sandi Valentinčič (born 25 August 1967) is a Slovenian retired footballer who played as a midfielder.

== Club career ==
Valentinčič played for Olimpija in the Yugoslav Second League and VfB Oldenburg in the German 2. Bundesliga.

== International career ==
Between 1995 and 1997, Valentinčič played six matches for the Slovenia national football team.
