= 2003–04 Slovenian Second League =

Slovenian Second League
- Season: 2003–04
- Champions: Rudar Velenje
- Promoted: Bela Krajina; Zagorje
- Relegated: Brda; Tabor Sežana
- Goals scored: 562
- Top goalscorer: Ismet Ekmečić (30 goals)

The 2003–04 Slovenian Second League season started on 10 August 2003 and ended on 6 June 2004. Each team played a total of 32 matches.

== League standing ==
Pos	Team	Pld	W	D	L	GF	GA	GD	Pts	Promotion or relegation
1	Rudar Velenje (C)	32	21	6	5	84	37	+47	69	
2	Bela Krajina (P)	32	20	5	7	62	32	+30	65	Qualification to promotion play-offs (Note: Bela Krajina lost the play-offs on away goals rule but got promoted anyway because Rudar Velenje declined promotion. Additionally, Zagorje also got promoted because Šmartno didn't get a licence and was thus relegated from the top flight.)
3	Zagorje (P)	32	20	5	7	62	33	+29	65	Promotion to Slovenian PrvaLiga
4	Dravinja	32	13	12	7	53	34	+19	51	
5	Aluminij	32	14	8	10	50	39	+11	50	
6	Livar	32	11	14	7	43	46	−3	47	
7	Krško	32	8	11	13	41	63	−22	35	
8	Svoboda	32	9	7	16	48	47	+1	34	
9	Triglav Kranj	32	9	7	16	43	53	−10	34	
10	Izola	32	6	9	17	31	58	−27	27	
11	Brda (R)	32	3	11	18	25	64	−39	20	Relegation to Slovenian Third League
12	Tabor Sežana (R)	22	3	5	14	20	56	−36	14	Withdrew from the competition

Source: NZS archive (in Slovene)
Rules for classification: 1) points; 2) goal difference; 3) number of goals scored.
(C) Champions; (P) Promoted; (R) Relegated

== See also ==
- 2003–04 Slovenian PrvaLiga
- 2003–04 Slovenian Third League
