= NK Grosuplje (defunct) =

Grosuplje
- Full name: Nogometni klub Grosuplje
- Founded: 1955; 71 years ago
- Dissolved: 2003; 23 years ago
- Ground: Brinje Stadium

Nogometni klub Grosuplje (English: Grosuplje Football Club), commonly referred to as NK Grosuplje or simply Grosuplje, was a Slovenian football club from Grosuplje. The club was dissolved after the 2002–03 Slovenian Second League season. A newly established club named NK Brinje Grosuplje was founded in 2003.

== Honours ==
- Slovenian Third League
  - Winners: 2001–02
- Slovenian Fourth Division
  - Winners: 1998–99

== Former international players ==
- Branko Ilić
