= 2003–04 Slovenian PrvaLiga =

Soccer tournament

Slovenian PrvaLiga
- Season: 2003–04
- Champions: Gorica (2nd title)
- Relegated: Dravograd; Šmartno
- Champions League: Gorica
- UEFA Cup: Maribor (cup winners); Primorje
- Intertoto Cup: Celje
- Matches played: 192
- Goals scored: 563 (2.93 per match)
- Best Player: Dražen Žeželj and Damir Pekič
- Top goalscorer: Dražen Žeželj (19 goals)
- Biggest home win: Primorje 6–0 Domžale
- Biggest away win: Dravograd 1–5 Domžale; Domžale 1–5 Celje
- Highest scoring: Olimpija 6–1 Maribor; Gorica 6–1 Mura; Drava 3–4 Olimpija; Primorje 5–2 Koper
- Longest winning run: 5 games Gorica
- Longest unbeaten run: 9 games Primorje; Gorica; Domžale; Ljubljana
- Longest winless run: 11 games Ljubljana
- Longest losing run: 6 games Drava
- Highest attendance: 7,000; Maribor 0–0 Olimpija
- Lowest attendance: 150; Ljubljana 2–1 Drava
- Total attendance: 229,850
- Average attendance: 1,197

The 2003–04 Slovenian PrvaLiga season started on 20 July 2003 and ended on 30 May 2004. Each team played a total of 32 matches.

== First stage ==
=== Table ===
Pos	Team	Pld	W	D	L	GF	GA	GD	Pts	Qualification
1	Gorica	22	12	6	4	46	21	+25	42	Qualification to championship group
2	Olimpija	22	12	5	5	42	27	+15	41	Qualification to championship group
3	Maribor	22	12	5	5	29	23	+6	41	Qualification to championship group
4	Primorje	22	10	8	4	49	25	+24	38	Qualification to championship group
5	Koper	22	10	7	5	28	17	+11	37	Qualification to championship group
6	Mura	22	10	4	8	41	41	0	34	Qualification to championship group
7	Celje	22	8	4	10	43	36	+7	28	Qualification to relegation group
8	Šmartno	22	6	8	8	27	35	−8	26	Qualification to relegation group
9	Domžale	22	7	3	12	26	42	−16	24	Qualification to relegation group
10	Ljubljana	22	5	4	13	22	44	−22	19	Qualification to relegation group
11	Dravograd	22	5	4	13	24	47	−23	19	Qualification to relegation group
12	Drava Ptuj	22	3	6	13	23	42	−19	15	Qualification to relegation group

Source: PrvaLiga (in Slovene)
Rules for classification: 1) points; 2) head-to-head points; 3) head-to-head goal difference; 4) head-to-head goals scored; 5) goal difference; 6) number of goals scored.

=== Results ===
Home \ Away	CEL	DOM	DRA	DRG	GOR	KOP	LJU	MAR	MUR	OLI	PRI	ŠMA
Celje		1–1	3–1	2–3	2–1	0–1	3–1	1–2	3–2	1–2	2–4	5–0
Domžale	1–5		3–2	3–0	0–1	0–3	1–1	0–1	0–1	2–1	0–0	2–1
Drava Ptuj	0–3	0–2		3–1	2–4	1–1	3–2	1–1	2–3	3–4	0–1	0–0
Dravograd	2–1	1–5	1–3		0–1	0–1	1–3	2–1	2–2	1–0	1–1	1–4
Gorica	1–4	3–0	3–0	1–1		0–0	5–0	2–0	6–1	5–1	2–1	3–1
Koper	0–0	2–1	3–0	3–0	2–0		1–0	0–1	1–1	1–1	0–2	1–1
Ljubljana	2–1	3–0	0–0	1–3	1–1	1–4		2–1	0–4	0–1	0–4	2–3
Maribor	3–0	1–0	4–1	1–0	1–0	1–0	2–1		3–3	0–0	2–1	1–2
Mura	3–2	3–1	1–0	3–1	2–2	0–1	0–1	1–2		0–4	4–3	3–1
Olimpija	2–2	4–1	1–0	4–0	0–3 (Note: Match awarded.)	2–1	0–0	6–1	2–1		1–0	3–0
Primorje	2–2	6–0	0–0	2–2	2–2	5–2	3–0	0–0	4–0	4–2		3–2
Šmartno	2–0	2–3	1–1	2–1	0–0	0–0	3–1	0–0	0–3	1–1	1–1	

Source: PrvaLiga (in Slovene)
Legend: Blue = home team win; Yellow = draw; Red = away team win.

== Second stage ==
=== Championship group ===
==== Table ====
Pos	Team	Pld	W	D	L	GF	GA	GD	Pts	Qualification
1	Gorica (C)	32	15	11	6	55	29	+26	56	Qualification to Champions League first qualifying round
2	Olimpija	32	16	7	9	59	39	+20	55	Ineligible for 2004–05 European competitions (Note: Olimpija failed to obtain a license for UEFA competitions due to failure to pay a players salaries in time, and Koper and Mura also did not obtain such a license. Therefore a UEFA Cup spot was then given to 6th-placed Primorje.)
3	Maribor	32	15	9	8	41	34	+7	54	Qualification to UEFA Cup first qualifying round (Note: Maribor won the 2003–04 Slovenian Football Cup and qualified for the first qualifying round of the UEFA Cup.)
4	Koper	32	13	11	8	41	32	+9	50	Ineligible for 2004–05 European competitions
5	Mura	32	14	7	11	53	54	−1	49	Ineligible for 2004–05 European competitions
6	Primorje	32	12	12	8	59	36	+23	48	Qualification to UEFA Cup first qualifying round

Source: PrvaLiga (in Slovene)
Rules for classification: 1) points; 2) head-to-head points; 3) head-to-head goal difference; 4) head-to-head goals scored; 5) goal difference; 6) number of goals scored.
(C) Champions

==== Results ====
Home \ Away	GOR	KOP	MAR	MUR	OLI	PRI
Gorica		2–0	1–1	0–0	1–0	0–0
Koper	1–1		1–0	4–1	2–0	0–0
Maribor	1–2	3–1		1–0	0–0	1–1
Mura	1–1	2–2	2–1		2–1	1–0
Olimpija	2–1	2–2	1–2	2–1		3–0
Primorje	2–0	3–0	2–2	1–2	1–2	

Source: PrvaLiga (in Slovene)
Legend: Blue = home team win; Yellow = draw; Red = away team win.

=== Relegation group ===
==== Table ====
Pos	Team	Pld	W	D	L	GF	GA	GD	Pts	Qualification or relegation
7	Ljubljana	32	12	6	14	38	53	−15	42	
8	Domžale	32	11	8	13	47	53	−6	41	
9	Šmartno (R)	32	10	10	12	43	48	−5	40	Relegation to Slovenian Second League (Note: Šmartno were administratively relegated to the Second League due to financial reasons.)
10	Celje	32	11	6	15	61	52	+9	39	Qualification to Intertoto Cup first round
11	Drava Ptuj	32	7	7	18	34	60	−26	28	Qualification to relegation play-offs
12	Dravograd (R)	32	7	4	21	35	73	−38	25	Relegation to Slovenian Second League

Source: PrvaLiga (in Slovene)
Rules for classification: 1) points; 2) head-to-head points; 3) head-to-head goal difference; 4) head-to-head goals scored; 5) goal difference; 6) number of goals scored.
(R) Relegated

==== Results ====
Home \ Away	CEL	DOM	DRA	DRG	LJU	ŠMA
Celje		1–3	0–1	5–1	1–2	2–1
Domžale	2–2		5–0	4–1	0–0	2–2
Drava Ptuj	0–0	3–1		3–1	0–3	2–0
Dravograd	1–4	0–2	3–1		1–2	2–1
Ljubljana	2–1	1–1	2–1	2–1		1–0
Šmartno	3–2	1–1	3–0	2–0	3–1	

Source: PrvaLiga (in Slovene)
Legend: Blue = home team win; Yellow = draw; Red = away team win.

=== Relegation play-offs ===
9 June 2004
17:00 CEST

Drava Ptuj	0–0	Bela Krajina
	Report

City Stadium, Ptuj
13 June 2004
17:00 CEST

Bela Krajina	1–1	Drava Ptuj
Fartek 48'	Report	Zilić 68'

Loka Stadium, Črnomelj
Attendance: 1,000

Drava Ptuj won on away goals rule.

== Top goalscorers ==
Rank	Player	Club	Goals
1	(Slovenia) Dražen Žeželj	Ljubljana/Primorje	19
2	(Slovenia) Marko Kmetec	Olimpija	16
3	(Slovenia) Alen Mujanovič	Maribor/Šmartno	15
3	(Slovenia) Mladen Kovačevič	Gorica	15
5	(Slovenia) Marko Vogrič	Primorje	14
6	(Slovenia) Saša Jakomin	Koper	13
6	(Croatia) Romano Obilinović	Mura	13
8	(Slovenia) Damir Pekič	Maribor	12
8	(Slovenia) Mitja Brulc	Celje	12
10	(Slovenia) Anton Žlogar	Olimpija	11

Source: PrvaLiga.si

== See also ==
- 2003–04 Slovenian Football Cup
- 2003–04 Slovenian Second League
