= NK Renče =

Renče
- Full name: Nogometni klub Renče
- Founded: 1970; 55 years ago
- Dissolved: 2001; 24 years ago
- Ground: Renče Sports Park

Nogometni klub Renče (English: Renče Football Club), commonly referred to as NK Renče or simply Renče, was a Slovenian football club from Renče. Founded in 1970, the club competed in the Slovenian Second League under the sponsorship name Goriške Opekarne. They played their home games at the Renče Sports Park. After the 2000–01 Slovenian Third League season, NK Renče was dissolved as they merged with NK Brda.

A successor club was established in 2000 under the name ND Renče.

== Honours ==
- Slovenian Third League

Winners: 1995–96, 2000–01
