= 2004–05 Slovenian Second League =

Slovenian Second League
- Season: 2004–05
- Champions: Rudar Velenje
- Relegated: Izola; Šmartno
- Matches: 198
- Goals: 604 (3.05 per match)
- Top goalscorer: Mirnes Ibrahimovič (32 goals)

The 2004–05 Slovenian Second League season started on 8 August 2004 and ended on 5 June 2005. Each team played a total of 33 matches.

== League standing ==
Pos	Team	Pld	W	D	L	GF	GA	GD	Pts	Promotion or relegation
1	Rudar Velenje (C, P)	33	23	3	7	76	40	+36	72	Promotion to Slovenian PrvaLiga
2	Nafta Lendava (P)	33	20	10	3	67	28	+39	70	Promotion to Slovenian PrvaLiga
3	Svoboda	33	18	7	8	52	33	+19	61	
4	Dravinja	33	18	4	11	43	36	+7	58	
5	Dravograd	33	15	9	9	55	43	+12	54	
6	Livar	33	15	4	14	48	38	+10	49	
7	Aluminij	33	14	5	14	68	51	+17	47	
8	Triglav Kranj	33	12	10	11	50	39	+11	46	
9	Factor	33	12	2	19	49	58	−9	38	
10	Krško	33	11	5	17	46	59	−13	38	
11	Izola (R)	33	4	7	22	25	71	−46	19	Relegation to Slovenian Third League
12	Šmartno (Note: 3 points deducted.) (R)	33	2	2	29	25	108	−83	5	Withdrew from the competition

Source: Soccerway, NZS archive (in Slovene)
(C) Champions; (P) Promoted; (R) Relegated

== See also ==
- 2004–05 Slovenian PrvaLiga
- 2004–05 Slovenian Third League
