= NK Korte =

Slovenian football club

Korte
- Full name: Nogometni klub Korte
- Founded: 1976; 50 years ago
- Ground: Malija Stadium
- Head coach: Jaka Štromajer
- League: Littoral League
- 2025–26: Littoral League, 9th of 11
Home colours	Away colours

Nogometni klub Korte (English: Korte Football Club), commonly referred to as NK Korte or simply Korte, is a Slovenian football club based in Korte that competes in the Littoral League, the fourth tier of Slovenian football. The club was founded in 1976.

== Honours ==
- Slovenian Third League
  - Winners: 1998–99, 2002–03, 2003–04
- Littoral League (fourth tier)
  - Winners: 1997–98, 2016–17
