= NK Olimpija Ljubljana (1945–2005) =

Olimpija
- Full name: Nogometni klub Olimpija Ljubljana
- Nicknames: Zmaji (The Dragons); Zeleno-beli (The Green and Whites)
- Founded: 1945; 81 years ago
- Dissolved: 2005; 21 years ago
- Ground: Bežigrad Stadium
- Capacity: 8,211
Home colours	Away colours

Nogometni klub Olimpija Ljubljana (Slovene pronunciation: [nɔɡɔˈméːtni ˈklúːp ɔˈlìːmpija ljubˈljàːna]; English: Olimpija Ljubljana Football Club), commonly referred to as NK Olimpija Ljubljana or simply Olimpija, was a Slovenian association football club based in Ljubljana. The club was founded in 1945 as NK Enotnost and adopted the name Olimpija in 1962.

Since the mid-1940s Olimpija had competed in the Yugoslav football system and between the late 1960s and late 1980s Olimpija was a regular member of the Yugoslav First League. Following Slovenia's independence in 1991 they won four Slovenian Championships and four Slovenian Cup titles, and they had also appeared in European competitions such as the UEFA Cup, UEFA Cup Winners' Cup and UEFA Intertoto Cup.

The club's home ground was Bežigrad Stadium, an 8,211 capacity stadium in Bežigrad District in Ljubljana. Olimpija's nicknames were The Dragons (Zmaji), as dragon is a symbol of Ljubljana, and The Green-Whites (Zeleno-beli), referring to their primary colours, green and white.

The club was dissolved in 2005 due to high financial debt. In the same year, a successor club was founded under the name NK Bežigrad, and currently competes in the Slovenian top flight under the name Olimpija Ljubljana.

== History ==
=== Yugoslav years (1945–1991) ===
In 1945, ŠD Tabor and ŠD Udarnik sports clubs merged and formed a new club called NK Enotnost, together with the players of the former SK Ljubljana. In 1948, the club was initially renamed to NK Odred, and later to NK Triglav in December 1960, with the club's colours at the time being black and white. During the same season, the club renamed to Olimpija.

In 1970, Olimpija reached the final of the Yugoslav Cup, where it lost to Red Star Belgrade 3–2 on aggregate.

=== Slovenian league champions (1991–1995) ===
Club crest during the 1990s

As a result of Slovenian independence in mid-1991 and the breakup of Yugoslavia, Olimpija agreed to join the newly formed Slovenian League. The inaugural 1991–92 season included a number of clubs from the lower tiers of the Yugoslav football league. The average attendance at Olimpija's matches dropped from 7,380 in 1989–90 to 1,075 in 1991–92. After finishing the first half of the season in second place three points behind Maribor, Olimpija had a string of good results after the winter break and ended the season with eleven consecutive wins which brought them their first Slovenian League title. The team for their final match included Robert Englaro, Aleš Čeh, Dejan Djuranovič and Sandi Valentinčič, and was coached by Lučjo Pertič.

The club went on to win three more consecutive titles, before Gorica won the 1995–96 edition, ending Olimpija's league domination.

=== Financial difficulties and dissolution (2003–2005) ===
In the 2003–04 UEFA Cup Olimpija beat Irish side Shelbourne in the qualifying round 4–2 on aggregate. In the next round they met Liverpool, and took the lead through captain Anton Žlogar's goal, the first leg at Bežigrad Stadium ending in a 1–1 draw as Michael Owen scored an eqaliser 12 minutes from time. Olimpija's last European season was then cut short as they were soundly beaten 3–0 through goals by Anthony Le Tallec, Emile Heskey and Harry Kewell in the away leg at Anfield.

Olimpija had a string of mixed results for the remainder of the season, getting knocked out in the round of 16 of the 2003–04 Slovenian Cup and finishing runners-up in the 2003–04 Slovenian PrvaLiga. However, most sponsors (including Schollmayer) decided to abandon the club at the end of the season which led to serious financial difficulties for the club. Following Schollmayer's exit, Olimpija were forced to sell almost all of their players. Although the club had started competing in the 2004–05 championship, the club had struggled on the pitch and failed to obtain competition licences issued by the Football Association of Slovenia, which led to its dissolution. Eventually the club, with a debt consisting of over 700 million Slovenian tolars (around €3 million in 2004 exchange rate), filed for bankruptcy in the middle of the 2004–05 season. However, the Football Association of Slovenia had exceptionally allowed the club to finish the 2004–05 season and, after finishing sixth in the national championship, Olimpija effectively ceased all operations.

In 2005, a successor club was established under the name NK Bežigrad, and currently competes in the Slovenian top flight under the name Olimpija Ljubljana. However, in spite of inheriting old Olimpija's supporters and colours, they are not legally considered to be successors to the original Olimpija and the two clubs' track records and honours are kept separate by the Football Association of Slovenia. However, some English-language sources regard the current Olimpija club as a continuation of the original club.

=== Claimed connection to Ilirija and the year 1911 ===
Amid political turmoil in the early 1990s, during the breakup of Yugoslavia, Olimpija began claiming direct lineage to Ilirija, an association football club established in 1911. It was during this time that Olimpija added the year 1911 on the official club crest for the first time in their history. Ilirija, a member of the Slovenian Second League at the time and the only Ljubljana based club the Football Association of Slovenia officially refers to as founded in 1911, have always criticized Olimpija actions and accused them of unilaterally appropriating their history.

=== Name changes ===
- NK Enotnost (1945–1948; founded as a merger of the newly established ŠD Tabor and ŠD Udarnik sports clubs and joined by former SK Ljubljana players)
- NK Odred (1948–1961)
- NK Triglav (1961–1962)
- NK Olimpija (1962–2005)

== Honours ==
Olimpija Ljubljana had won four Slovenian Championships, four Slovenian Cups and one Slovenian Supercup in the period between the country's independence from Yugoslavia in 1991 until the club's dissolution in 2005. Although the club had spent 22 seasons in top flight during the Yugoslavia period (1945–1991), the club never won any silverware and the closest they came to winning a major domestic trophy was reaching the 1970 Yugoslav Cup final.

Internationally, Olimpija had appeared in the UEFA Cup six times, in the UEFA Champions League twice, in the UEFA Cup Winners' Cup twice and in the UEFA Intertoto Cup once, in addition to two appearances in the Inter-Cities Fairs Cup. Their best result in European football was reaching the second round of the 1996–97 UEFA Cup Winners' Cup.

Honours	No.	Years
League
Slovenian First League winners	4	1991–92, 1992–93, 1993–94, 1994–95
Slovenian First League runners-up	3	1995–96, 2000–01, 2003–04
Yugoslav Second League winners (second tier in Yugoslavia)	2	1964–65 (West Division), 1988–89
Slovenian Republic League winners (third tier in Yugoslavia)	4	1946–47, 1952, 1961–62, 1986–87
Domestic cups
Slovenian Cup winners	4	1992–93, 1995–96, 1999–2000, 2002–03
Slovenian Cup runners-up	3	1991–92, 1998–99, 2000–01
Slovenian Supercup winners	1	1995
Slovenian Supercup runners-up	1	1996
Yugoslav Cup runners-up	1	1970
Best European results
UEFA Champions League first round	1	1992–93
UEFA Cup Winners' Cup second round	1	1996–97
