= List of football clubs in Slovenia =

This is a list of association football clubs located in Slovenia, sorted alphabetically. Only clubs with an article are listed.

== Men's clubs ==
=== A ===
- ND Adria
- NK Aluminij

=== B ===
- ND Beltinci
- ND Bilje
- NK Bistrica
- NK Bled
- NK Bravo
- NK Brda
- NK Brežice
- NK Brinje Grosuplje

=== C ===
- NK Celje

=== Č ===
- NK Čarda
- NK Črenšovci

=== D ===
- NK Dekani
- NK Dob
- ND Dravinja
- NK Dravograd

=== F ===
- NK Fužinar

=== H ===
- NK Hrastnik

=== I ===
- NK IB 1975 Ljubljana
- ND Ilirija 1911
- NK Ilirska Bistrica
- NK Ivančna Gorica
- NK Izola

=== J ===
- NK Jadran Hrpelje-Kozina
- NK Jesenice
- NK Jezero Medvode

=== K ===
- NK Kamnik
- NK Kočevje
- NK Kolpa
- FC Koper
- NK Korotan Prevalje
- NK Korte
- NK Kovinar Štore
- NK Kranj
- NK Krim
- NK Krka
- NK Krško Posavje

=== L ===
- NK Limbuš-Pekre
- NK Ljutomer

=== M ===
- NK Malečnik
- NK Maribor
- NŠ Mura

=== N ===
- NK Nafta 1903
- NK Naklo

=== O ===
- NK Odranci
- NK Olimpija Ljubljana (2005)

=== P ===
- NK Pohorje
- ND Primorje

=== R ===
- NK Rače
- ŠNK Radgona
- NK Radomlje
- NK Rakičan
- NK Rogaška
- NK Rudar Trbovlje
- NK Rudar Velenje

=== S ===
- NK Sava Kranj
- ND Slovan
- NK Svoboda Kisovec
- NK Svoboda Ljubljana

=== Š ===
- NK Šampion
- NK Šenčur
- NK Šentjur
- NK Šmarje pri Jelšah
- NK Šmartno 1928
- NK Šoštanj

=== T ===
- NK Tabor Sežana
- NK Tolmin
- NK Triglav Kranj

=== V ===
- NK Veržej
- NK Vipava

=== Z ===
- NK Zagorje
- DNŠ Zavrč

=== Defunct clubs ===
- I. SSK Maribor
- NK Ankaran
- Athletik SK
- NK Bela Krajina
- NK Beltinci
- SC Bonifika
- NK Branik Maribor
- NK Domžale
- FC Drava Ptuj
- NK Drava Ptuj
- ND Gorica
- NK Grafičar Ljubljana
- NK Grosuplje
- NK Izola
- SK Jadran
- NK Korotan Prevalje
- NK Kovinar Maribor
- FC Ljubljana
- NK Ljubljana
- SK Ljubljana
- NK Maribor B
- NK Mengeš
- NK Mura
- ND Mura 05
- NK Nafta Lendava
- NK Olimp Celje
- NK Olimpija
- NK Piran
- ASK Primorje
- NK Primorje
- SV Rapid Marburg
- NK Renče
- SK Rote Elf
- NK Šentjur
- NK Slavija Vevče
- NK Šmartno ob Paki
- NK Steklar
- NK Stol Virtus
- NK Zavrč
- NK Železničar Maribor

== Women's clubs ==
- ŽNK Krka (defunct)
- ŽNK MB Tabor (defunct)
- ŽNK Mura
- ŽNK Olimpija Ljubljana
- ŽNK Radomlje
- ŽNK Škale (defunct)
- ŽNK Slovenj Gradec (defunct)
