= Football in Ljubljana =

Association football is the most popular sport, both in terms of participants and spectators, in Ljubljana, Slovenia.

== History ==
The first Slovenian football club, Hermes, was founded in Ljubljana in 1909. Two clubs based in Ljubljana – SK Ilirija and SK Slovan – participated in the 1920 Slovenian League as a founding members.

== Clubs ==
The table below lists all Ljubljana clubs.

- Active

| Club | Founded |
|---|---|
| NK Bravo | 2006 |
| NK IB 1975 Ljubljana | 1975 |
| ND Ilirija 1911 | 1911 |
| NK Krim | 1945 |
| ŠD NK Ljubljana | 2008 |
| NK Olimpija Ljubljana | 2005 |
| ND Slavija Vevče | 2016 |
| ND Slovan | 1913 |
| NK Svoboda Ljubljana | 1952 |
| NK Šmartno | 1979 |
| NK Arne Tabor 69 | 1969 |

- Defunct

| Club | Years |
|---|---|
| NK Grafičar Ljubljana | 1948–1958 |
| NK Ljubljana | 1909–2005 |
| SK Jadran | 1920–1941 |
| NK Olimpija Ljubljana | 1945–2005 |
| FC Ljubljana | 2005–2011 |
| ASK Primorje | 1920–1936 |
| SK Reka | 1926–1941 |
| NK Slavija Vevče | 1921–1999 |
| SSK Sparta Ljubljana | 1920–1922 |
| SK Svoboda Ljubljana | 1920–1941 |
| SK Ljubljana | 1936–1941 |

== Honours ==
- Slovenian Champions (1991–present) (7)
  - Olimpija (1945) (4)
  - Olimpija (2005) (3)
- Ljubljana Subassociation League Champions (1920–1941) (16)
  - Ilirija (12)
  - Primorje (2)
  - SK Ljubljana (2)
- Republic League Champions (1945–1991) (16)
  - Železničar (5)
  - Olimpija (1945) (4)
  - Svoboda (4)
  - Slovan (2)
  - Garnizija JLA (1)
- Slovenian Football Cup (10)
  - Olimpija (1945) (4)
  - Olimpija (2005) (4)
  - Interblock (2)
- Slovenian Supercup (2)
  - Olimpija (1945) (1)
  - Interblock (1)
- Slovenian Republic Football Cup (1953–1991) (16)
  - Olimpija (1945) (13)
  - Svoboda (2)
  - Slovan (1)

== Ljubljana derbies ==
There were two major Ljubljana derbies. The first was between SK Ilirija and ASK Primorje, contested between 1920 and 1936, when both clubs merged. The second was between Olimpija and Železničar after the World War II. Both clubs were dissolved in 2005.

== Stadiums ==
- Bežigrad Stadium
- Ilirija Sports Park
- Kodeljevo Sports Park
- Šiška Sports Park
- Stožice Stadium

== See also ==
- Football in Slovenia
