= 1935–36 Ljubljana Subassociation League =

Ljubljana Subassociation League
- Season: 1935–36
- Champions: SK Ljubljana (1st title)

The 1935–36 Ljubljana Subassociation League was the 17th season of the Ljubljana Subassociation League. SK Ljubljana won the league for the first time.

== Ljubljana subdivision ==
Pos	Team	Pld	W	D	L	GF	GA	GD	Pts
1	Primorje	8	7	1	0	32	8	+24	15
2	Hermes	8	6	1	1	30	9	+21	13
3	Celje	8	3	1	4	11	22	−11	7
4	Korotan Kranj	8	2	1	5	16	29	−13	5
5	Ilirija	8	0	0	8	0	21	−21	0

== Maribor subdivision ==
Pos	Team	Pld	W	D	L	GF	GA	GD	Pts
1	Železničar Maribor	8	6	1	1	22	11	+11	13
2	Čakovec	8	4	1	3	22	18	+4	9
3	I. SSK Maribor	8	4	1	3	28	24	+4	9
4	Athletik	8	3	0	5	15	30	−15	6
5	Rapid	8	1	1	6	19	22	−3	3

== Final ==
Pos	Team	Pld	W	D	L	GF	GA	GD	Pts
1	SK Ljubljana	6	4	1	1	16	8	+8	9
2	Čakovec	6	3	0	3	17	12	+5	6
3	Železničar Maribor	6	2	1	3	8	12	−4	5
4	Hermes	6	2	0	4	10	19	−9	4
