= 1954–55 Slovenian Republic League =

Slovenian Republic League
- Season: 1954–55
- Champions: Rudar Trbovlje; Železničar Gorica
- Relegated: Branik Solkan; Piran
- Matches played: 180
- Goals scored: 769 (4.27 per match)

== East table ==
Pos	Team	Pld	W	D	L	GF	GA	GD	Pts
1	Rudar Trbovlje	18	14	1	3	61	24	+37	29
2	Mura	18	12	2	4	59	27	+32	26
3	Bratstvo Hrastnik	18	10	4	4	44	28	+16	24
4	Nafta Lendava	18	9	2	7	43	38	+5	20
5	Rudar Velenje	18	9	2	7	49	55	−6	20
6	Proletarec	18	8	1	9	38	45	−7	17
7	Kovinar Maribor	18	7	3	8	31	34	−3	17
8	Aluminij	18	7	1	10	37	47	−10	15
9	Kovinar Štore	18	6	0	12	27	44	−17	12
10	Drava Ptuj	18	0	0	18	14	63	−49	0

== West table ==
Pos	Team	Pld	W	D	L	GF	GA	GD	Pts
1	Železničar Gorica	18	14	2	2	72	20	+52	30
2	Krim	18	14	2	2	68	21	+47	30
3	Grafičar Ljubljana	18	11	1	6	44	30	+14	23
4	Korotan Kranj	18	8	1	9	37	39	−2	17
5	Slovan	18	8	0	10	30	40	−10	16
6	Aurora Koper	18	7	2	9	26	27	−1	16
7	Postojna	18	5	5	8	20	42	−22	15
8	Izola	18	5	3	10	30	41	−11	13
9	Branik Solkan	18	6	1	11	26	48	−22	13
10	Piran	18	3	1	14	13	49	−36	7

== Qualification for Yugoslav Inter-Republic League ==
10 July 1955

Rudar Trbovlje	4–1	Železničar Gorica

Rudar Stadium, Trbovlje
17 July 1955

Železničar Gorica	5–1	Rudar Trbovlje

Igrišče v Šempetru, Šempeter pri Gorici
