= 1936–37 Ljubljana Subassociation League =

Ljubljana Subassociation League
- Season: 1936–37
- Champions: Železničar Maribor

The 1936–37 Ljubljana Subassociation League was the 18th season of the Ljubljana Subassociation League. Železničar Maribor won the league for the first time.

== Ljubljana subdivision ==
Pos	Team	Pld	W	D	L	GF	GA	GD	Pts
1	Amater	10	5	2	3	17	16	+1	12
2	Olimp	10	3	5	2	17	18	−1	11
3	Kranj	10	4	2	4	24	18	+6	10
4	Slovan	10	4	2	4	20	20	0	10
5	Hermes	10	4	1	5	14	20	−6	9
6	Reka	10	3	2	5	18	18	0	8

== Maribor subdivision ==
Pos	Team	Pld	W	D	L	GF	GA	GD	Pts
1	Železničar Maribor	10	7	0	3	34	14	+20	14
2	Celje	10	6	1	3	23	15	+8	13
3	I. SSK Maribor	10	6	1	3	21	15	+6	13
4	Čakovec	10	3	3	4	24	23	+1	9
5	Rapid	10	4	1	5	21	23	−2	9
6	Athletik	10	1	0	9	7	40	−33	2

== Final ==
Pos	Team	Pld	W	D	L	GF	GA	GD	Pts
1	Železničar Maribor	6	6	0	0	36	5	+31	12
2	Celje	6	3	0	3	10	22	−12	6
3	Amater	6	2	0	4	9	22	−13	4
4	Olimp	6	1	0	5	7	13	−6	2
