= 1929–30 Ljubljana Subassociation League =

Ljubljana Subassociation League
- Season: 1929–30
- Champions: Ilirija

The 1929–30 Ljubljana Subassociation League was the eleventh season of the Ljubljana Subassociation League. Ilirija won the league after defeating I. SSK Maribor with 7–6 on aggregate in the final. I. SSK Maribor won the first match 5–3, but Ilirija won the second match 4–1 to clinch the title.

== Celje subdivision ==
Pos	Team	Pld	W	D	L	Pts
1	Celje	4	3	1	0	7
2	Athletik	4	1	2	1	4
3	Olimp	4	0	1	3	1

== Ljubljana subdivision ==
Pos	Team	Pld	W	D	L	GF	GA	GD	Pts
1	Ilirija	8	7	1	0	32	9	+23	15
2	Primorje	8	5	2	1	33	10	+23	12
3	Hermes	8	4	1	3	18	17	+1	9
4	Svoboda	8	1	1	6	12	35	−23	3
5	Jadran	8	0	1	7	11	32	−21	1

== Maribor subdivision ==
Pos	Team	Pld	W	D	L	GF	GA	GD	Pts
1	I. SSK Maribor	6	5	0	1	31	7	+24	10
2	Rapid	6	4	1	1	22	13	+9	9
3	Železničar Maribor	6	2	1	3	18	16	+2	5
4	Svoboda	6	0	0	6	3	38	−35	0

== Semi-final ==
Team 1	Agg.	Team 2	1st leg	2nd leg
I. SSK Maribor	8–4	Celje	4–1	4–3

== Final ==
Team 1	Agg.	Team 2	1st leg	2nd leg
Ilirija	7–6	I. SSK Maribor	3–5	4–1
