= 1939–40 Ljubljana Subassociation League =

Ljubljana Subassociation League
- Season: 1939–40
- Champions: Železničar Maribor

The 1939–40 Ljubljana Subassociation League was the 21st season of the Ljubljana Subassociation League. Železničar Maribor won the league for the second time, defeating I. SSK Maribor in the final.

== Celje subdivision ==
Pos	Team	Pld	W	D	L	GF	GA	GD	Pts
1	Amater	8	5	3	0	24	9	+15	13
2	Olimp	8	5	2	1	24	11	+13	12
3	Celje	8	4	1	3	21	16	+5	9
4	Hrastnik	8	2	1	5	14	17	−3	5
5	Athletik	8	0	1	7	9	39	−30	1

== Ljubljana subdivision ==
Pos	Team	Pld	W	D	L	GF	GA	GD	Pts
1	Kranj	14	10	3	1	44	20	+24	23
2	Bratstvo	14	9	2	3	46	25	+21	20
3	Mars	14	9	1	4	36	34	+2	19
4	Hermes	14	7	3	4	42	24	+18	17
5	Jadran	14	4	4	6	27	30	−3	12
6	Reka	14	2	3	9	19	38	−19	9
7	Svoboda	14	3	2	9	21	48	−27	8
8	Disk	14	2	2	10	31	47	−16	6

== Maribor subdivision ==
Pos	Team	Pld	W	D	L	GF	GA	GD	Pts
1	Čakovec	10	8	0	2	31	17	+14	16
2	Železničar Maribor	10	7	1	2	23	8	+15	15
3	I. SSK Maribor	10	5	0	5	19	17	+2	10
4	Mura	10	3	1	6	17	23	−6	7
5	Rapid	10	3	0	7	15	22	−7	6
6	Građanski	10	2	2	6	13	31	−18	6

== Quarter-final ==
Team 1	Agg.	Team 2	1st leg	2nd leg
Čakovec	9–4	Mars	4–2	5–2
Železničar Maribor	6–4	Bratstvo	6–1	0–3
I. SSK Maribor	6–1	Olimp	3–0	3–1
Kranj	6–2	Amater	2–2	4–0

== Semi-final ==
Team 1	Agg.	Team 2	1st leg	2nd leg
I. SSK Maribor	6–4	Čakovec	4–2	2–2
Železničar Maribor	7–3	Kranj	3–2	4–1

== Final ==
Team 1	Score	Team 2
Železničar Maribor	2–1	I. SSK Maribor
I. SSK Maribor	2–1	Železničar Maribor
Železničar Maribor	2–0	I. SSK Maribor
