= 1962–63 Slovenian Republic League =

Slovenian Republic League
- Season: 1962–63
- Champions: Ljubljana
- Relegated: Ilirija; Rudar Velenje
- Matches played: 182
- Goals scored: 638 (3.51 per match)

== Final table ==
Pos	Team	Pld	W	D	L	GF	GA	GD	Pts
1	Ljubljana	26	18	4	4	83	36	+47	40
2	Triglav Kranj	26	16	5	5	49	31	+18	37
3	Rudar Trbovlje	26	13	5	8	53	48	+5	31
4	Slovan	26	13	4	9	44	46	−2	30
5	Kladivar Celje	26	10	9	7	51	42	+9	29
6	Svoboda	26	10	8	8	43	30	+13	28
7	Železničar Maribor	26	10	7	9	47	40	+7	27
8	ŽŠD Celje	26	10	7	9	45	42	+3	27
9	Gorica	26	10	6	10	47	48	−1	26
10	Odred Krim	26	10	6	10	41	40	+1	26
11	Izola	26	8	6	12	35	52	−17	22
12	Mura	26	7	6	13	40	52	−12	20
13	Ilirija	26	4	6	16	31	55	−24	14
14	Rudar Velenje	26	3	1	22	29	83	−54	7
