= 1938–39 Ljubljana Subassociation League =

Ljubljana Subassociation League
- Season: 1938–39
- Champions: I. SSK Maribor

The 1938–39 Ljubljana Subassociation League was the 20th season of the Ljubljana Subassociation League. I. SSK Maribor won the league for the third time, defeating Bratstvo in the final.

== Celje subdivision ==
Pos	Team	Pld	W	D	L	GF	GA	GD	Pts
1	Athletik	8	5	2	1	18	8	+10	12
2	Celje	8	4	2	2	28	14	+14	10
3	Amater	8	2	4	2	10	13	−3	8
4	Olimp	8	1	3	4	14	19	−5	5
5	Jugoslavija	8	1	3	4	12	28	−16	5

== Ljubljana subdivision ==
Pos	Team	Pld	W	D	L	GF	GA	GD	Pts
1	Bratstvo	14	10	1	3	35	19	+16	21
2	Hermes	14	8	3	3	35	26	+9	19
3	Kranj	14	8	2	4	60	28	+32	18
4	Reka	14	7	2	5	38	25	+13	16
5	Jadran	14	7	2	5	30	30	0	16
6	Mars	14	5	1	8	29	39	−10	11
7	Svoboda	14	5	0	9	26	34	−8	10
8	Kovinar Jesenice	14	0	1	13	20	72	−52	1

== Maribor subdivision ==
Pos	Team	Pld	W	D	L	GF	GA	GD	Pts
1	Čakovec	10	6	4	0	23	9	+14	16
2	Železničar Maribor	10	4	5	1	15	10	+5	13
3	I. SSK Maribor	10	3	4	3	21	18	+3	10
4	Mura	10	3	2	5	23	25	−2	8
5	Rapid	10	3	2	5	19	21	−2	8
6	Slavija	10	1	3	6	10	28	−18	5

== Quarter-final ==
Team 1	Agg.	Team 2	1st leg	2nd leg
I. SSK Maribor	4–2	Hermes	2–0	2–2
Čakovec	5–1	Celje	3–0	2–1
Kranj	5–4	Železničar Maribor	2–3	3–1
Athletik	6–2	Bratstvo	2–2	4–0

== Semi-final ==
Team 1	Agg.	Team 2	1st leg	2nd leg
I. SSK Maribor	7–4	Kranj	3–1	4–3
Bratstvo	4–3	Čakovec	0–3	4–0

== Final ==
Team 1	Agg.	Team 2	1st leg	2nd leg
I. SSK Maribor	5–2	Bratstvo	3–1	2–1
