= 1963–64 Slovenian Republic League =

Slovenian Republic League
- Season: 1963–64
- Champions: Kladivar Celje
- Relegated: Olimp; Odred Krim
- Matches played: 156
- Goals scored: 588 (3.77 per match)

== Final table ==
Pos	Team	Pld	W	D	L	GF	GA	GD	Pts
1	Kladivar Celje	24	18	3	3	59	23	+36	39
2	Svoboda	24	13	5	6	50	35	+15	31
3	Rudar Trbovlje	24	11	8	5	53	30	+23	30
4	Triglav Kranj	24	13	4	7	46	31	+15	30
5	Slovan	24	12	5	7	50	37	+13	29
6	Ljubljana	24	11	3	10	49	39	+10	25
7	Mura	24	10	4	10	44	44	0	24
8	Nova Gorica	24	8	7	9	32	44	−12	23
9	Aluminij	24	7	8	9	40	43	−3	22
10	ŽŠD Celje	24	8	4	12	55	60	−5	20
11	Železničar Maribor	24	7	5	12	53	52	+1	19
12	Izola	24	4	5	15	32	59	−27	13
13	Olimp	24	2	3	19	25	75	−50	7
14	Odred Krim	0	–	–	–	–	–	—	0
