= 1921–22 Ljubljana Subassociation League =

1921-22 sports event (third season of the Slovenian Republic League)

Ljubljana Subassociation League
- Season: 1921–22
- Champions: Ilirija

The 1921–22 Ljubljana Subassociation League was the third season of the Ljubljana Subassociation League. Ilirija won the league for the third season in a row, defeating I. SSK Maribor 5–1 in the final.

== Celje subdivision ==
Pos	Team	Pld	W	D	L	Pts
1	Athletik	4	3	1	0	7
2	Celje	4	2	1	1	5
3	Svoboda	2	0	0	2	0

== Ljubljana subdivision ==
Pos	Team	Pld	W	D	L	Pts
1	Ilirija	4	4	0	0	8
2	Primorje	4	1	1	2	3
3	Sparta	4	0	1	3	1

== Maribor subdivision ==
Pos	Team	Pts
1	I. SSK Maribor	19
2	Rapid	14
3	MAK	12
4	Svoboda	8
5	Ptuj	2
6	Korotan (W)	0

(W) Withdrew

== Semi-final ==
Team 1	Score	Team 2
Athletik	0–2	I. SSK Maribor

== Final ==
Team 1	Score	Team 2
Ilirija	5–1	I. SSK Maribor
