= 1925–26 Ljubljana Subassociation League =

Ljubljana Subassociation League
- Season: 1925–26
- Champions: Ilirija

The 1925–26 Ljubljana Subassociation League was the seventh season of the Ljubljana Subassociation League. Ilirija won the league for the seventh season in a row, defeating Rapid in the final.

== Celje subdivision ==
Pos	Team	Pld	W	D	L	Pts
1	Celje	4	4	0	0	8
2	Athletik	4	2	0	2	4
3	Red Star	4	0	0	4	0

== Ljubljana subdivision ==
Pos	Team	Pld	W	D	L	GF	GA	GD	Pts
1	Ilirija	12	11	0	1	95	7	+88	22
2	Primorje	12	8	0	4	60	15	+45	16
3	Jadran	12	8	0	4	48	29	+19	16
4	Slovan	12	8	0	4	52	40	+12	16
5	Hermes	12	5	0	7	28	39	−11	10
6	Slavija	12	1	0	11	9	64	−55	2
7	Svoboda	12	1	0	11	4	102	−98	2

== Maribor subdivision ==
Pos	Team	Pld	W	D	L	GF	GA	GD	Pts
1	Rapid	10	9	0	1	68	17	+51	18
2	I. SSK Maribor	10	7	1	2	48	22	+26	15
3	Ptuj	10	5	1	4	31	36	−5	11
4	Merkur	10	5	0	5	47	42	+5	8
5	Svoboda	10	2	0	8	21	48	−27	4
6	Mura	10	1	0	9	6	63	−57	2

== Semi-final ==
Team 1	Score	Team 2
Celje	0–3 (w/o)	Ilirija

== Final ==
Team 1	Score	Team 2
Ilirija	6–1	Rapid
