= 1927–28 Ljubljana Subassociation League =

Ljubljana Subassociation League
- Season: 1927–28
- Champions: Primorje

The 1927–28 Ljubljana Subassociation League was the ninth season of the Ljubljana Subassociation League. Primorje won the league for the first time after defeating I. SSK Maribor 2–1 in the final. The Football Association of Ljubljana later repeal the match, and in the replay, I. SSK Maribor won the game 2–1. However, the Football Association of Yugoslavia repeal the replayed match and confirmed Primorje as the champions.

== Celje subdivision ==
| Pos | Team | Pld | W | D | L | Pts |
|---|---|---|---|---|---|---|
| 1 | Athletik | 2 | 2 | 0 | 0 | 4 |
| 2 | Celje | 2 | 0 | 0 | 2 | 0 |

== Ljubljana subdivision ==
| Pos | Team | Pld | W | D | L | GF | GA | GD | Pts |
|---|---|---|---|---|---|---|---|---|---|
| 1 | Ilirija | 10 | 9 | 0 | 1 | 69 | 9 | +60 | 18 |
| 1 | Primorje | 10 | 9 | 0 | 1 | 46 | 6 | +40 | 18 |
| 3 | Slovan | 10 | 4 | 1 | 5 | 28 | 41 | −13 | 9 |
| 4 | Hermes | 10 | 3 | 1 | 6 | 21 | 29 | −8 | 7 |
| 5 | Jadran | 10 | 3 | 1 | 6 | 15 | 59 | −44 | 7 |
| 6 | Slavija | 10 | 0 | 1 | 9 | 8 | 43 | −35 | 1 |

== Play-off ==
| Team 1 | Score | Team 2 |
|---|---|---|
| Primorje | 2–1 | Ilirija |

== Maribor subdivision ==
| Pos | Team | Pld | W | D | L | GF | GA | GD | Pts |
|---|---|---|---|---|---|---|---|---|---|
| 1 | I. SSK Maribor | 8 | 8 | 0 | 0 | 40 | 2 | +38 | 16 |
| 2 | Rapid | 8 | 6 | 0 | 2 | 24 | 6 | +18 | 12 |
| 3 | Ptuj | 8 | 2 | 1 | 5 | 14 | 40 | −26 | 5 |
| 4 | Železničar Maribor | 8 | 2 | 0 | 6 | 16 | 26 | −10 | 4 |
| 5 | Svoboda | 8 | 1 | 1 | 6 | 7 | 27 | −20 | 3 |
| 6 | Merkur | 0 | – | – | – | – | – | — | 0 |

== Semi-final ==
| Team 1 | Score | Team 2 |
|---|---|---|
| I. SSK Maribor | 3–0 (w/o) | Athletik |

== Final ==
| Team 1 | Score | Team 2 |
|---|---|---|
| Primorje | 2–1 | I. SSK Maribor |
