= 1964–65 Slovenian Republic League =

Slovenian Republic League
- Season: 1964–65
- Champions: Slovan
- Relegated: Svoboda; Ilirija; Hrastnik; Izola
- Matches played: 182
- Goals scored: 704 (3.87 per match)

== Final table ==
Pos	Team	Pld	W	D	L	GF	GA	GD	Pts
1	Slovan	26	14	8	4	63	32	+31	36
2	Aluminij	26	16	3	7	66	40	+26	35
3	Železničar Maribor	26	14	6	6	53	35	+18	34
4	Ljubljana	26	12	6	8	64	45	+19	30
5	Triglav Kranj	26	11	7	8	46	40	+6	29
6	Branik Maribor	26	13	2	11	44	39	+5	28
7	Nova Gorica	26	9	8	9	47	47	0	26
8	Mura	26	9	8	9	56	46	+10	26
9	ŽŠD Celje	26	11	4	11	59	56	+3	26
10	Rudar Trbovlje	26	9	7	10	42	46	−4	25
11	Svoboda	26	10	4	12	65	58	+7	24
12	Ilirija	26	6	8	12	32	48	−16	20
13	Hrastnik	26	8	4	14	46	79	−33	20
14	Izola	26	2	3	21	21	82	−61	7
