= 1960–61 Slovenian Republic League =

Slovenian Republic League
- Season: 1960–61
- Champions: Maribor
- Promoted: Maribor
- Relegated: Olimp; Nafta Lendava
- Matches played: 132
- Goals scored: 525 (3.98 per match)

== Final table ==
Pos	Team	Pld	W	D	L	GF	GA	GD	Pts
1	Maribor (Note: The first part of the season was played by ŽŠD Maribor. During the winter break, NK Maribor was formed, which took over the points and the league place of ŽŠD Maribor.)	22	16	3	3	60	22	+38	35
2	Kladivar Celje	22	14	3	5	73	34	+39	31
3	Ljubljana	22	11	6	5	63	30	+33	28
4	Rudar Trbovlje	22	11	5	6	49	40	+9	27
5	Mura	22	11	5	6	56	41	+15	27
6	Slovan	22	8	6	8	43	33	+10	22
7	Ilirija	22	8	5	9	38	62	−24	21
8	Krim	22	8	5	9	32	55	−23	21
9	Nova Gorica	22	6	6	10	32	56	−24	18
10	Triglav Kranj	22	6	5	11	37	43	−6	17
11	Olimp	22	5	3	14	29	63	−34	13
12	Nafta Lendava	22	1	2	19	13	86	−73	4
