= 1970–71 Slovenian Republic League =

Slovenian Republic League
- Season: 1970–71
- Champions: Mercator Ljubljana
- Relegated: Triglav Kranj; Kovinar Maribor
- Matches played: 132
- Goals scored: 438 (3.32 per match)

== Final table ==
Pos	Team	Pld	W	D	L	GF	GA	GD	Pts
1	Mercator Ljubljana	22	12	8	2	57	25	+32	32
2	Kladivar Celje	22	11	7	4	46	35	+11	29
3	Rudar Trbovlje	22	9	8	5	37	31	+6	26
4	Branik Maribor	22	9	7	6	51	39	+12	25
5	Aluminij	22	8	9	5	40	36	+4	25
6	Drava Ptuj	22	8	6	8	34	42	−8	22
7	Slavija Vevče	22	6	8	8	33	38	−5	20
8	Ilirija	22	6	7	9	21	28	−7	19
9	Nafta Lendava	22	6	7	9	26	34	−8	19
10	Izola	22	6	6	10	28	32	−4	18
11	Triglav Kranj	22	7	5	10	43	44	−1	13 (Note: 6 points deducted)
12	Kovinar Maribor	22	4	2	16	22	54	−32	10
