= 1926–27 Ljubljana Subassociation League =

Ljubljana Subassociation League
- Season: 1926–27
- Champions: Ilirija

The 1926–27 Ljubljana Subassociation League was the eighth season of the Ljubljana Subassociation League. Ilirija won the league for the eighth season in a row, defeating Rapid 4–3 in the final.

== Celje subdivision ==
Pos	Team	Pld	Pts
1	Athletik	6	10
2	Celje	6	2
3	Šoštanj	6	2
4	Red Star	6	2

== Ljubljana subdivision ==
Pos	Team	Pld	W	D	L	GF	GA	GD	Pts
1	Ilirija	8	6	1	1	32	14	+18	13
2	Primorje	8	5	0	3	35	16	+19	10
3	Jadran	8	2	2	4	16	27	−11	6
4	Slovan	8	3	0	5	15	27	−12	6
5	Hermes	8	2	1	5	12	26	−14	5

== Maribor subdivision ==
Pos	Team	Pld	W	D	L	GF	GA	GD	Pts
1	Rapid	8	7	0	1	58	15	+43	14
2	I. SSK Maribor	8	6	1	1	46	12	+34	13
3	Merkur	8	3	0	5	13	33	−20	6
4	Ptuj	8	1	2	5	13	49	−36	4
5	Svoboda	8	1	1	6	10	31	−21	3

== Semi-final ==
Team 1	Score	Team 2
Rapid	6–2	Athletik

== Final ==
Team 1	Score	Team 2
Ilirija	4–3	Rapid
