= 1928–29 Ljubljana Subassociation League =

Ljubljana Subassociation League
- Season: 1928–29
- Champions: Primorje

The 1928–29 Ljubljana Subassociation League was the tenth season of the Ljubljana Subassociation League. Primorje defended the title after defeating I. SSK Maribor with 12–7 on aggregate in the final.

== Celje subdivision ==
Pos	Team	Pld	W	D	L	Pts
1	Celje	2	2	0	0	4
2	Athletik	2	0	0	2	0

== Ljubljana subdivision ==
Pos	Team	Pld	W	D	L	GF	GA	GD	Pts
1	Primorje	8	8	0	0	45	7	+38	16
2	Ilirija	8	6	0	2	43	12	+31	12
3	Hermes	8	4	0	4	18	32	−14	8
4	Jadran	8	1	0	7	9	37	−28	2
5	Slovan	8	1	0	7	7	34	−27	2

== Maribor subdivision ==
Pos	Team	Pld	W	D	L	GF	GA	GD	Pts
1	I. SSK Maribor	6	6	0	0	29	6	+23	12
2	Rapid	6	4	0	2	26	5	+21	8
3	Železničar Maribor	6	2	0	4	16	16	0	4
4	Svoboda	6	0	0	6	5	49	−44	0
5	Ptuj	0	–	–	–	–	–	—	0

== Semi-final ==
Team 1	Agg.	Team 2	1st leg	2nd leg
I. SSK Maribor	7–4	Celje	3–1	4–3

== Final ==
Team 1	Agg.	Team 2	1st leg	2nd leg
Primorje	12–7	I. SSK Maribor	7–3	5–4
