= 1920–21 Ljubljana Subassociation League =

Ljubljana Subassociation League
- Season: 1920–21
- Champions: Ilirija

The 1920–21 Ljubljana Subassociation League was the second season of the Ljubljana Subassociation League. The league was separated into Celje, Ljubljana and Maribor subdivisions. The final was played between the previous season winners Ilirija from Ljubljana, and Athletik from Celje. Ilirija defeated Athletik in the final and won their second title in a row.

== Celje subdivision ==
Pos	Team	Pld	W	D	L	Pts
1	Athletik	2	2	0	0	4
2	Celje	2	0	0	2	0

== Ljubljana subdivision ==
Pos	Team	Pld	W	D	L	Pts
1	Ilirija	2	2	0	0	4
2	Svoboda	2	0	0	2	0

== Maribor subdivision ==
Pos	Team	Pld	W	D	L	Pts
1	I. SSK Maribor	2	2	0	0	4
2	Rapid	2	1	0	1	2
3	MAK	2	0	0	2	0

== Semi-final ==
Team 1	Score	Team 2
I. SSK Maribor	1–2	Athletik

== Final ==
Team 1	Score	Team 2
Athletik	5–5	Ilirija
Ilirija	7–2	Athletik
