= 1971–72 Slovenian Republic League =

Slovenian Republic League
- Season: 1971–72
- Champions: Rudar Trbovlje
- Relegated: Branik Maribor; Rudar Velenje; Slivnica
- Matches played: 132
- Goals scored: 437 (3.31 per match)

== Final table ==
Pos	Team	Pld	W	D	L	GF	GA	GD	Pts
1	Rudar Trbovlje	22	16	2	4	46	17	+29	34
2	Ilirija	22	13	6	3	41	16	+25	32
3	Drava Ptuj	22	11	5	6	52	39	+13	27
4	Slavija Vevče	22	11	4	7	42	25	+17	26
5	Koper	22	8	9	5	31	21	+10	25
6	Kladivar Celje	22	9	6	7	49	31	+18	24
7	Izola	22	8	6	8	27	27	0	22
8	Aluminij	22	8	4	10	42	34	+8	20
9	Nafta Lendava	22	7	6	9	33	28	+5	20
10	Branik Maribor	22	6	4	12	33	44	−11	16
11	Rudar Velenje	22	3	9	10	20	38	−18	15
12	Slivnica	22	0	3	19	21	107	−86	3
