= 1987–88 Slovenian Republic League =

Slovenian Republic League
- Season: 1987–88
- Champions: Koper
- Relegated: Triglav Kranj; Steklar
- Matches: 182
- Goals: 451 (2.48 per match)

== Final table ==
Pos	Team	Pld	W	D	L	GF	GA	GD	Pts
1	Koper	26	18	6	2	45	15	+30	42
2	Maribor	26	16	6	4	38	16	+22	38
3	Ljubljana	26	13	8	5	43	24	+19	34
4	Rudar Trbovlje	26	10	11	5	32	23	+9	31
5	Domžale	26	8	11	7	27	26	+1	27
6	Slovan	26	8	10	8	35	30	+5	26
7	Vozila	26	10	6	10	34	32	+2	26
8	Mura	26	10	6	10	36	36	0	26
9	Rudar Velenje	26	8	10	8	31	31	0	26
10	Kladivar Celje	26	7	10	9	36	31	+5	24
11	Izola	26	6	7	13	25	39	−14	19
12	Elkroj Mozirje	26	5	8	13	27	37	−10	18
13	Triglav Kranj	26	3	8	15	22	43	−21	14
14	Steklar	26	2	9	15	20	58	−38	13
