= 1982–83 Slovenian Republic League =

Slovenian Republic League
- Season: 1982–83
- Champions: Slovan
- Relegated: Tabor Sežana; Nafta Lendava
- Matches played: 182
- Goals scored: 555 (3.05 per match)

== Final table ==
| Pos | Team | Pld | W | D | L | GF | GA | GD | Pts |
|---|---|---|---|---|---|---|---|---|---|
| 1 | Slovan | 26 | 20 | 4 | 2 | 77 | 27 | +50 | 44 |
| 2 | Izola | 26 | 13 | 5 | 8 | 43 | 34 | +9 | 31 |
| 3 | Šmartno | 26 | 13 | 3 | 10 | 47 | 34 | +13 | 29 |
| 4 | Koper | 26 | 10 | 8 | 8 | 35 | 41 | −6 | 28 |
| 5 | Mura | 26 | 11 | 6 | 9 | 36 | 48 | −12 | 28 |
| 6 | Rudar Trbovlje | 26 | 10 | 6 | 10 | 33 | 31 | +2 | 26 |
| 7 | Rudar Velenje | 26 | 8 | 10 | 8 | 38 | 39 | −1 | 26 |
| 8 | Stol Kamnik | 26 | 10 | 5 | 11 | 40 | 54 | −14 | 25 |
| 9 | Kovinar Maribor | 26 | 10 | 4 | 12 | 39 | 40 | −1 | 24 |
| 10 | Železničar Maribor | 26 | 7 | 10 | 9 | 37 | 31 | +6 | 24 |
| 11 | Primorje | 26 | 10 | 5 | 11 | 34 | 38 | −4 | 24 (Note: 1 point deducted) |
| 12 | Triglav Kranj | 26 | 9 | 3 | 14 | 39 | 43 | −4 | 21 |
| 13 | Tabor Sežana | 26 | 6 | 6 | 14 | 36 | 51 | −15 | 18 |
| 14 | Nafta Lendava | 26 | 5 | 5 | 16 | 21 | 54 | −33 | 14 |
