= 1930–31 Ljubljana Subassociation League =

Ljubljana Subassociation League
- Season: 1930–31
- Champions: I. SSK Maribor

The 1930–31 Ljubljana Subassociation League was the 12th season of the Ljubljana Subassociation League. I. SSK Maribor won the league for the first time after defeating Svoboda with 13–2 on aggregate in the final.

== Celje subdivision ==
Pos	Team	Pts
1	Athletik	11
2	Olimp	8
3	Šoštanj	5
4	Celje	0

== Ljubljana subdivision ==
Pos	Team	Pld	W	D	L	GF	GA	GD	Pts
1	Svoboda	4	3	0	1	11	7	+4	6
2	Hermes	4	2	1	1	12	7	+5	5
3	Grafika	4	0	1	3	6	15	−9	1

== Maribor subdivision ==
Pos	Team	Pld	W	D	L	GF	GA	GD	Pts
1	I. SSK Maribor	6	4	1	1	38	6	+32	9
2	Železničar Maribor	6	2	3	1	20	5	+15	7
3	Rapid	6	2	3	1	14	8	+6	7
4	Svoboda	6	0	1	5	4	57	−53	1

== Semi-final ==
Team 1	Agg.	Team 2	1st leg	2nd leg
I. SSK Maribor	9–3	Athletik	1–2	8–1

== Final ==
Team 1	Agg.	Team 2	1st leg	2nd leg
I. SSK Maribor	13–2	Svoboda	7–2	6–0
