= 1977–78 Slovenian Republic League =

Slovenian Republic League
- Season: 1977–78
- Champions: Mercator Ljubljana
- Matches played: 156
- Goals scored: 463 (2.97 per match)

== Final table ==
Pos	Team	Pld	W	D	L	GF	GA	GD	Pts
1	Mercator Ljubljana	24	19	2	3	70	19	+51	40
2	Mura	24	15	6	3	43	23	+20	36
3	Šmartno	24	13	4	7	39	23	+16	30
4	Obala Izola	24	11	4	9	42	32	+10	26
5	Slovan	24	9	7	8	36	30	+6	25
6	Vozila	24	9	6	9	32	28	+4	24
7	Zasavje Trbovlje	24	8	7	9	45	41	+4	22 (Note: 1 point deducted)
8	Ilirija	24	5	12	7	26	38	−12	21
9	Železničar Maribor	24	7	8	9	40	43	−3	22
10	Drava Ptuj	24	7	6	11	34	37	−3	20
11	Kladivar Celje	24	8	4	12	26	48	−22	20
12	Unior Konjice	24	5	3	16	18	50	−32	13
13	Gorenjska Kranj	24	4	3	17	12	49	−37	11
