= 1969–70 Slovenian Republic League =

Slovenian Republic League
- Season: 1969–70
- Champions: Mura
- Relegated: Nova Gorica
- Matches played: 132
- Goals scored: 409 (3.1 per match)

== Final table ==
Pos	Team	Pld	W	D	L	GF	GA	GD	Pts
1	Mura	22	15	3	4	55	18	+37	33
2	Nafta Lendava	22	10	8	4	45	28	+17	28
3	Aluminij	22	10	6	6	46	27	+19	26
4	Svoboda	22	10	6	6	44	28	+16	26
5	Rudar Trbovlje	22	6	11	5	30	27	+3	23
6	Izola	22	9	5	8	23	27	−4	23
7	Kovinar Maribor	22	7	8	7	35	41	−6	22
8	Ilirija	22	5	9	8	25	36	−11	19
9	Slavija Vevče	22	7	4	11	28	37	−9	18
10	Kladivar Celje	22	6	6	10	24	35	−11	18
11	Drava Ptuj	22	3	9	10	33	47	−14	15
12	Nova Gorica	22	5	2	15	21	57	−36	12
