= 1924–25 Ljubljana Subassociation League =

Ljubljana Subassociation League
- Season: 1924–25
- Champions: Ilirija
- Goals scored: 179

The 1924–25 Ljubljana Subassociation League was the sixth season of the Ljubljana Subassociation League. Ilirija won the league for the sixth season in a row.

== Final table ==
Pos	Team	Pld	W	D	L	GF	GA	GD	Pts
1	Ilirija	12	11	1	0	57	5	+52	23
2	Rapid	12	7	0	5	28	25	+3	14
3	Jadran	12	5	2	5	18	27	−9	12
4	Hermes	12	4	3	5	18	21	−3	11
5	Primorje	12	4	3	5	21	35	−14	11
6	I. SSK Maribor	12	4	1	7	20	32	−12	9
7	Celje	12	1	2	9	17	34	−17	4
