= 1976–77 Slovenian Republic League =

Slovenian Republic League
- Season: 1976–77
- Champions: Rudar Velenje
- Relegated: Slavija Vevče
- Matches played: 132
- Goals scored: 365 (2.77 per match)

== Final table ==
Pos	Team	Pld	W	D	L	GF	GA	GD	Pts
1	Rudar Velenje	22	13	6	3	38	13	+25	32
2	Mura	22	14	3	5	45	18	+27	31
3	Kladivar Celje	22	12	6	4	37	17	+20	30
4	Šmartno	22	10	5	7	36	29	+7	25
5	Rudar Trbovlje	22	8	7	7	33	25	+8	23
6	Litija	22	8	7	7	24	26	−2	23
7	Pohorje	22	8	4	10	30	42	−12	20
8	Izola	22	6	7	9	28	38	−10	19
9	Ilirija	22	5	7	10	24	34	−10	17
10	Primorje	22	4	9	9	26	40	−14	17
11	Železničar Maribor	22	5	4	13	25	37	−12	14
12	Slavija Vevče	22	5	3	14	19	46	−27	13
