= 1981–82 Slovenian Republic League =

Slovenian Republic League
- Season: 1981–82
- Champions: Maribor
- Relegated: Ilirija; Ptuj
- Matches: 182
- Goals: 547 (3.01 per match)

== Final table ==
Pos	Team	Pld	W	D	L	GF	GA	GD	Pts
1	Maribor	26	18	6	2	52	13	+39	42
2	Izola	26	13	10	3	40	22	+18	36
3	Mura	26	12	10	4	50	30	+20	34
4	Slovan	26	10	12	4	39	22	+17	32
5	Šmartno	26	12	7	7	63	35	+28	31
6	Triglav Kranj	26	7	11	8	38	44	−6	25
7	Železničar Maribor	26	7	10	9	31	37	−6	24
8	Stol Kamnik	26	8	8	10	41	53	−12	24
9	Rudar Trbovlje	26	6	10	10	32	38	−6	22
10	Lendava	26	7	8	11	34	41	−7	22
11	Koper	26	4	12	10	28	33	−5	20
12	Primorje	26	5	10	11	40	62	−22	20
13	Ilirija	26	3	11	12	22	40	−18	17
14	Ptuj	26	6	3	17	37	67	−30	15
