= 1980–81 Slovenian Republic League =

Slovenian Republic League
- Season: 1980–81
- Champions: Šmartno
- Relegated: Kladivar Celje; Vozila
- Matches played: 132
- Goals scored: 362 (2.74 per match)

== Final table ==
Pos	Team	Pld	W	D	L	GF	GA	GD	Pts
1	Šmartno	22	13	5	4	37	18	+19	31
2	Slovan	22	12	6	4	37	23	+14	30
3	Mura	22	12	4	6	51	29	+22	28
4	Železničar Maribor	22	11	5	6	31	15	+16	27
5	Nafta Lendava	22	11	5	6	31	15	+16	27
6	Rudar Trbovlje	22	10	4	8	39	26	+13	24
7	Izola	22	7	8	7	29	27	+2	22
8	Triglav Kranj	22	4	8	10	16	24	−8	16
9	Koper	22	5	6	11	18	43	−25	16
10	Ilirija	22	5	5	12	24	44	−20	15
11	Kladivar Celje	22	5	4	13	24	41	−17	14
12	Vozila	22	5	4	13	25	44	−19	14
