= 1934–35 Ljubljana Subassociation League =

Ljubljana Subassociation League
- Season: 1934–35
- Champions: Ilirija

The 1934–35 Ljubljana Subassociation League was the 16th season of the Ljubljana Subassociation League. Ilirija won the league.

== Final table ==
Pos	Team	Pld	W	D	L	GF	GA	GD	Pts
1	Ilirija	14	10	2	2	59	18	+41	22
2	Železničar Maribor	14	10	2	2	39	22	+17	22
3	Rapid	14	8	0	6	45	22	+23	16
4	Čakovec	14	5	4	5	30	27	+3	14
5	I. SSK Maribor	14	6	1	7	17	33	−16	13
6	Hermes	14	4	1	9	29	34	−5	9
7	Celje	14	3	3	8	21	39	−18	9
8	Svoboda	14	2	3	9	15	66	−51	7
