= 1974–75 Slovenian Republic League =

Slovenian Republic League
- Season: 1974–75
- Champions: Mercator Ljubljana
- Relegated: Ljubljana; Nafta Lendava; Koper
- Matches played: 182
- Goals scored: 564 (3.1 per match)

== Final table ==
Pos	Team	Pld	W	D	L	GF	GA	GD	Pts
1	Mercator Ljubljana	26	23	1	2	69	19	+50	44 (Note: 3 points deducted)
2	Mura	26	17	4	5	69	33	+36	35
3	Pohorje	27	11	7	9	34	38	−4	29
4	Vozila	27	11	7	9	40	41	−1	27 (Note: 2 points deducted)
5	Ilirija	26	10	6	10	37	39	−2	26
6	Kladivar Celje	26	11	4	11	42	41	+1	23
7	Izola	26	8	7	11	31	36	−5	23
8	Drava Ptuj	26	9	4	13	35	38	−3	22
9	Slovan	26	6	10	10	38	44	−6	22
10	Železničar Maribor	26	11	2	13	36	37	−1	20 (Note: 4 points deducted)
11	Slavija Vevče	26	8	3	15	48	59	−11	19
12	Ljubljana	26	7	6	13	32	42	−10	17
13	Nafta Lendava	26	8	5	13	34	50	−16	17
14	Koper	25	3	10	12	19	47	−28	12
