= 1952 Slovenian Republic League =

Slovenian Republic League
- Season: 1952
- Champions: Odred Ljubljana
- Matches played: 90
- Goals scored: 359 (3.99 per match)

The 1952 season was the 29th season of the Slovenian Republic League and the 7th while Slovenia was a part of Yugoslavia. The top four clubs were granted a place in the second level inter-republic Slovene-Croatian League. The Slovenian Republic League was split into West and East divisions in the following season.

== Final table ==
Pos	Team	Pld	W	D	L	GF	GA	GD	Pts
1	Odred Ljubljana	18	16	1	1	81	21	+60	33
2	Branik Maribor	18	10	4	4	40	20	+20	24
3	Rudar Trbovlje	18	8	3	7	32	29	+3	19
4	Železničar Ljubljana	18	8	3	7	33	31	+2	19
5	Nafta Lendava	18	7	5	6	26	28	−2	19
6	Korotan Kranj	18	8	2	8	47	43	+4	18
7	Železničar Maribor	18	6	3	9	27	40	−13	15
8	Kladivar Celje	18	5	3	10	24	36	−12	13
9	Mura	18	5	3	10	27	52	−25	13
10	Sloga	18	2	3	13	22	59	−37	7

== Qualification for Yugoslav First League ==
6 June 1952

Velež Mostar	2–1	Odred Ljubljana

Gradski stadion, Mostar
20 June 1952

Odred Ljubljana	3–1	Proleter Osijek

Bežigrad, Ljubljana
27 June 1952

Odred Ljubljana	3–0	Velež Mostar

Bežigrad, Ljubljana
9 August 1952

Proleter Osijek	4–1	Odred Ljubljana

Stadion kraj Drave, Osijek

Pos	Team	Pld	W	D	L	GF	GA	GD	Pts
1	Velež Mostar	4	3	0	1	5	5	0	6
2	Odred Ljubljana	4	2	0	2	8	7	+1	4
3	Proleter Osijek	4	1	0	3	6	7	−1	2
