= 1986–87 Slovenian Republic League =

Slovenian Republic League
- Season: 1986–87
- Champions: Olimpija
- Relegated: Železničar Maribor; Kovinar Maribor
- Matches: 182
- Goals: 483 (2.65 per match)

== Final table ==
Pos	Team	Pld	W	D	L	GF	GA	GD	Pts
1	Olimpija	26	20	6	0	64	4	+60	46
2	Koper	26	19	4	3	46	16	+30	42
3	Slovan	26	14	6	6	46	20	+26	34
4	Ljubljana	26	10	8	8	37	37	0	28
5	Mura	26	11	4	11	31	36	−5	26
6	Elkroj Mozirje	26	9	7	10	36	37	−1	25
7	Rudar Velenje	26	9	7	10	30	36	−6	25
8	Rudar Trbovlje	26	8	7	11	24	30	−6	23
9	Kladivar Celje	26	7	8	11	32	42	−10	22
10	Triglav Kranj	26	5	10	11	26	36	−10	20
11	Vozila	26	7	6	13	31	48	−17	20
12	Domžale	26	6	8	12	27	49	−22	20
13	Železničar Maribor	26	5	8	13	24	46	−22	18
14	Kovinar Maribor	26	5	5	16	29	56	−27	15
