= 1922–23 Ljubljana Subassociation League =

Ljubljana Subassociation League
- Season: 1922–23
- Champions: Ilirija

The 1922–23 Ljubljana Subassociation League was the fourth season of the Ljubljana Subassociation League. Ilirija won the league for the fourth consecutive time, defeating I. SSK Maribor 6–1 in the final.

== Celje subdivision ==
Pos	Team	Pts
1	Athletik	4
2	Celje	0

== Ljubljana subdivision ==
Pos	Team	Pts
1	Ilirija	6
2	Hermes	3
3	Primorje	1

== Maribor subdivision ==
Pos	Team	Pts
1	I. SSK Maribor	12
2	Rapid	12
3	Svoboda	9
4	Ptuj	2

== Semi-final ==
Team 1	Score	Team 2
I. SSK Maribor	2–1	Athletik

== Final ==
Team 1	Score	Team 2
Ilirija	6–1	I. SSK Maribor
