= 1931–32 Ljubljana Subassociation League =

Ljubljana Subassociation League
- Season: 1931–32
- Champions: Ilirija
- Goals scored: 130

The 1931–32 Ljubljana Subassociation League was the 13th season of the Ljubljana Subassociation League. Ilirija won the league.

== Final table ==
Pos	Team	Pld	W	D	L	GF	GA	GD	Pts
1	Ilirija	10	8	0	2	31	14	+17	16
2	Primorje	10	6	2	2	25	14	+11	14
3	I. SSK Maribor	10	4	3	3	27	20	+7	11
4	Železničar Maribor	10	4	2	4	15	19	−4	10
5	Svoboda	10	2	4	4	20	24	−4	8
6	Athletik	10	0	1	9	12	39	−27	1
