= 1973–74 Slovenian Republic League =

Slovenian Republic League
- Season: 1973–74
- Champions: Rudar Trbovlje
- Relegated: Kovinar Maribor; Šmartno; Aluminij
- Matches played: 182
- Goals scored: 498 (2.74 per match)

== Final table ==
| Pos | Team | Pld | W | D | L | GF | GA | GD | Pts |
|---|---|---|---|---|---|---|---|---|---|
| 1 | Rudar Trbovlje | 26 | 14 | 9 | 3 | 49 | 17 | +32 | 37 |
| 2 | Kladivar Celje | 26 | 15 | 6 | 5 | 39 | 27 | +12 | 36 |
| 3 | Ljubljana | 26 | 12 | 7 | 7 | 38 | 26 | +12 | 31 |
| 4 | Železničar Maribor | 26 | 12 | 6 | 8 | 38 | 24 | +14 | 30 |
| 5 | Slovan | 26 | 12 | 6 | 8 | 41 | 34 | +7 | 30 |
| 6 | Ilirija | 26 | 11 | 6 | 9 | 35 | 31 | +4 | 28 |
| 7 | Koper | 26 | 10 | 7 | 9 | 28 | 32 | −4 | 27 |
| 8 | Slavija Vevče | 26 | 8 | 7 | 11 | 41 | 41 | 0 | 23 |
| 9 | Drava Ptuj | 26 | 7 | 9 | 10 | 33 | 42 | −9 | 23 |
| 10 | Nafta Lendava | 26 | 9 | 5 | 12 | 30 | 41 | −11 | 23 |
| 11 | Izola | 26 | 6 | 10 | 10 | 28 | 35 | −7 | 22 |
| 12 | Kovinar Maribor | 26 | 9 | 4 | 13 | 31 | 42 | −11 | 22 |
| 13 | Šmartno | 26 | 7 | 5 | 14 | 42 | 49 | −7 | 19 |
| 14 | Aluminij | 26 | 5 | 3 | 18 | 25 | 57 | −32 | 13 |
