= 1947–48 Slovenian Republic League =

Slovenian Republic League
- Season: 1947–48
- Champions: Garnizija JLA Ljubljana
- Relegated: Krim
- Matches played: 56
- Goals scored: 216 (3.86 per match)

The 1947–48 season was the 25th season of the Slovenian Republic League and the third as a part of SFR Yugoslavia.

== Final table ==
Pos	Team	Pld	W	D	L	GF	GA	GD	Pts
1	Garnizija JLA Ljubljana	14	14	0	0	52	18	+34	28
2	Kladivar Celje	14	6	3	5	38	26	+12	15
3	Železničar Maribor	14	6	3	5	26	22	+4	15
4	Nafta Lendava	14	6	1	7	21	24	−3	13
5	Polet Maribor	14	5	2	7	22	26	−4	12
6	Rudar Trbovlje	14	4	3	7	22	31	−9	11
7	Železničar Ljubljana	14	4	2	8	15	38	−23	10
8	Krim	14	3	2	9	20	50	−30	8

== Qualification for Yugoslav Second League ==
13 June 1948

Kladivar Celje	2–2	Napredak Kruševac

Stadion Glazija, Celje
20 June 1948

Napredak Kruševac	0–0 (3–0 w/o)	Kladivar Celje

Stadion Mladost, Kruševac
