= 1932–33 Ljubljana Subassociation League =

Ljubljana Subassociation League
- Season: 1932–33
- Champions: I. SSK Maribor
- Goals scored: 78

The 1932–33 Ljubljana Subassociation League was the 14th season of the Ljubljana Subassociation League. I. SSK Maribor won the league title for the second time.

== Final table ==
Pos	Team	Pld	W	D	L	GF	GA	GD	Pts
1	I. SSK Maribor	7	4	1	2	24	15	+9	9
2	Rapid	7	4	0	3	18	20	−2	8
3	Železničar Maribor	7	2	1	4	13	22	−9	5
4	Ilirija	7	1	2	4	13	16	−3	4
5	Primorje	4	2	2	0	10	5	+5	6
6	Svoboda	0	–	–	–	–	–	—	0
