= 1979–80 Slovenian Republic League =

Slovenian Republic League
- Season: 1979–80
- Champions: Mercator Ljubljana
- Relegated: Drava Ptuj; Unior Konjice
- Matches played: 132
- Goals scored: 413 (3.13 per match)

== Final table ==
Pos	Team	Pld	W	D	L	GF	GA	GD	Pts
1	Mercator Ljubljana	22	16	2	4	72	22	+50	34
2	Slovan	22	12	7	3	47	23	+24	31
3	Izola	22	10	6	6	35	27	+8	26
4	Železničar Maribor	22	10	6	6	31	25	+6	26
5	Mura	22	10	5	7	47	38	+9	25
6	Šmartno	22	9	4	9	46	35	+11	22
7	Vozila	22	7	6	9	20	30	−10	20
8	Ilirija	22	6	6	10	26	38	−12	18
9	Lendava	22	7	4	11	21	33	−12	18
10	Triglav Kranj	22	7	4	11	29	46	−17	18
11	Drava Ptuj	22	6	5	11	19	30	−11	17
12	Unior Konjice	22	3	3	16	20	67	−47	9

Source: RSSSF
