= 1978–79 Slovenian Republic League =

Slovenian Republic League
- Season: 1978–79
- Champions: Rudar Trbovlje

The 1978–79 season of the Slovenian Republic League consisted of two stages. In the first stage, teams were divided geographically into West and East groups of nine teams each. After 16 games, the top three teams in each group were combined into a six-team "Superleague", each of which played 10 games. Rudar Trbovlje won the Superleague and was crowned as league champions.

== East table ==
Pos	Team	Pld	W	D	L	GF	GA	GD	Pts
1	Mura	16	9	3	4	38	13	+25	21
2	Rudar Trbovlje	16	8	4	4	27	14	+13	20
3	Lendava	16	7	3	6	26	26	0	17
4	Drava Ptuj	16	6	5	5	19	19	0	17
5	Železničar Maribor	16	5	6	5	18	14	+4	16
6	Unior Konjice	16	6	4	6	20	24	−4	16
7	Šmartno	16	5	4	7	16	28	−12	14
8	Kladivar Celje	16	4	4	8	22	29	−7	12
9	Litija	16	3	5	8	13	30	−17	11

== West table ==
Pos	Team	Pld	W	D	L	GF	GA	GD	Pts
1	Obala Izola	16	10	3	3	31	14	+17	23
2	Vozila	16	8	6	2	29	15	+14	22
3	Slovan	16	7	6	3	32	14	+18	20
4	Primorje	16	7	5	4	23	20	+3	19
5	Ilirija	16	6	4	6	20	18	+2	16
6	Kamnik	16	5	6	5	16	23	−7	16
7	Tabor Sežana	16	4	3	9	14	26	−12	11
8	Dolenjska	16	1	7	8	17	34	−17	9
9	Kranj	16	2	4	10	10	28	−18	8

== Superleague final table ==
Pos	Team	Pld	W	D	L	GF	GA	GD	Pts
1	Rudar Trbovlje	10	6	3	1	24	6	+18	15
2	Obala Izola	10	6	2	2	21	22	−1	14
3	Mura	10	5	1	4	19	17	+2	11
4	Lendava	10	4	2	4	10	20	−10	10
5	Vozila	10	1	4	5	6	11	−5	6
6	Slovan	10	1	2	7	13	38	−25	4

== Relegation East ==
Pos	Team	Pld	W	D	L	GF	GA	GD	Pts
1	Šmartno	10	6	3	1	17	9	+8	15
2	Drava Ptuj	10	6	2	2	24	15	+9	14
3	Unior Konjice	10	4	2	4	12	19	−7	10
4	Železničar Maribor	10	4	1	5	19	15	+4	9
5	Kladivar Celje	10	2	2	6	13	19	−6	6
6	Litija	10	2	2	6	13	21	−8	6

== Relegation West ==
Pos	Team	Pld	W	D	L	GF	GA	GD	Pts
1	Dolenjska	10	7	1	2	16	7	+9	15
2	Kranj	10	5	4	1	11	6	+5	14
3	Ilirija	10	6	1	3	22	8	+14	13
4	Kamnik	10	2	3	5	6	19	−13	7
5	Tabor Sežana	10	1	4	5	7	12	−5	6
6	Primorje	10	1	3	6	8	18	−10	5
