= 1923–24 Ljubljana Subassociation League =

Ljubljana Subassociation League
- Season: 1923–24
- Champions: Ilirija

The 1923–24 Ljubljana Subassociation League was the fifth season of the Ljubljana Subassociation League. Ilirija won the league for the fifth time in a row, defeating I. SSK Maribor 5–0 in the final.

== Celje subdivision ==
Pos	Team	Pts
1	Celje	4
2	Athletik	0

== Ljubljana subdivision ==
Pos	Team	Pts
1	Ilirija	6
2	Hermes	3
3	Jadran	2

== Maribor subdivision ==
Pos	Team	Pts
1	I. SSK Maribor	11
2	Rapid	9
3	Svoboda	3
4	Ptuj	1

== Semi-final ==
Team 1	Score	Team 2
I. SSK Maribor	6–0	Celje

== Final ==
Team 1	Score	Team 2
Ilirija	5–0	I. SSK Maribor
