= 1990–91 Slovenian Republic League =

Slovenian Republic League
- Season: 1990–91
- Champions: Rudar Velenje
- Relegated: Elan Novo Mesto; Partizan Žalec
- Matches played: 240
- Goals scored: 650 (2.71 per match)

The Slovenian Republic League 1990–91 was the last season of Slovenian top-league within the Yugoslav football system. The first fourteen clubs secured their place in a newly established Slovenian First League.

== Final table ==
Pos	Team	Pld	W	D	L	GF	GA	GD	Pts	Relegation
1	Rudar Velenje (C)	30	16	9	5	57	31	+26	41	
2	Slovan	30	17	4	9	54	27	+27	38	
3	Svoboda	30	14	6	10	42	35	+7	34	
4	Ljubljana	30	12	10	8	46	41	+5	34	
5	Nafta Lendava	30	12	9	9	47	36	+11	33	
6	Kladivar Celje	30	13	7	10	48	43	+5	33	
7	Domžale	30	9	13	8	34	35	−1	31	
8	Naklo	30	11	7	12	50	40	+10	29	
9	Steklar	30	11	7	12	46	47	−1	29	
10	Vozila	30	10	9	11	33	41	−8	29	
11	Mura	30	9	10	11	40	51	−11	28	
12	Rudar Trbovlje	30	8	11	11	32	38	−6	27	
13	Jadran Dekani	30	8	10	12	35	40	−5	26	
14	Medvode	30	10	6	14	28	45	−17	26	
15	Elan Novo Mesto	30	9	8	13	37	49	−12	24 (Note: 2 points deducted.)	Relegated to Slovenian Second League
16	Partizan Žalec	30	6	4	20	21	51	−30	16	Relegated to Slovenian Second League

(C) Champions
