= 1933–34 Ljubljana Subassociation League =

Ljubljana Subassociation League
- Season: 1933–34
- Champions: Ilirija
- Goals scored: 160

The 1933–34 Ljubljana Subassociation League was the 15th season of the Ljubljana Subassociation League. Ilirija won the league.

== Final table ==
Pos	Team	Pld	W	D	L	GF	GA	GD	Pts
1	Ilirija	10	7	2	1	42	20	+22	16
2	Železničar Maribor	10	6	2	2	37	21	+16	14
3	Čakovec	10	3	4	3	24	27	−3	10
4	Hermes	10	3	4	3	18	29	−11	10
5	Celje	10	2	2	6	21	28	−7	6
6	I. SSK Maribor	10	1	2	7	18	36	−18	4
