= 1920 Ljubljana Subassociation League =

Ljubljana Subassociation League
- Season: 1920
- Champions: Ilirija
- Matches played: 21
- Goals scored: 137 (6.52 per match)

The 1920 Ljubljana Subassociation League was the first season of the Ljubljana Subassociation League. Ilirija won the league, becoming the first ever Slovenian champion. The league consisted of the Slovenian-based teams Ilirija, Slovan and I. SSK Maribor, while Rapid, Hertha and Rote Elf were German teams from Maribor, founded by the Germanic part of Maribor's population. Athletik was another German club, based in Celje.

== Final table ==
| Pos | Team | Pld | W | D | L | GF | GA | GD | Pts |
|---|---|---|---|---|---|---|---|---|---|
| 1 | Ilirija | 6 | 6 | 0 | 0 | 51 | 3 | +48 | 12 |
| 2 | Rapid | 6 | 4 | 0 | 2 | 16 | 18 | −2 | 8 |
| 3 | Slovan | 6 | 3 | 1 | 2 | 13 | 15 | −2 | 7 |
| 4 | Hertha | 6 | 3 | 1 | 2 | 16 | 19 | −3 | 7 |
| 5 | Athletik | 6 | 2 | 2 | 2 | 20 | 22 | −2 | 6 |
| 6 | Rote Elf | 6 | 1 | 0 | 5 | 10 | 29 | −19 | 2 |
| 7 | I. SSK Maribor | 6 | 0 | 0 | 6 | 11 | 31 | −20 | 0 |

Source: snportal.si
