= Slovenian Republic Football Cup =

- Founded: 1951; 74 years ago
- Folded: 1991; 34 years ago
- Country: SR Slovenia
- Most championships: Maribor; Olimpija (both 13 titles)

The Slovenian Republic Football Cup (Slovene: Slovenski republiški nogometni pokal) was the football knockout competition in SR Slovenia within the Yugoslav football system, and served as a qualifier for the main stage of the Yugoslav Cup. After the independence of Slovenia in 1991, it was transformed into the Slovenian Football Cup.

== Finals ==
=== Key ===
| Match went to extra time |
| Match decided by a penalty shootout after extra time |
| Match decided on aggregate score in two-legged fixtures |

| Year | Winners | Score(s) | Runners-up | Venue |
|---|---|---|---|---|
| 1951 | Mura | 3–2 | Železničar Gorica | Fazanerija |
| 1952 | Rudar Trbovlje | 3–1 | Garnizija JLA Vipava | |
| 1953 | Odred | 6–0 | Branik Maribor | Bežigrad |
| 1954 | Odred | 5–2 | Rudar Trbovlje | Bežigrad |
| 1955 | Odred | 8–0 | Rudar Trbovlje | Bežigrad |
| 1956 | Odred | 1–0 | Triglav Kranj | Korotan Stadium |
| 1957 | ŽŠD Maribor | 5–0 | Odred | Ob Tržaški Cesti Stadium |
| 1958 | Odred | 2–0 | Nova Gorica | ŽŠD Ljubljana |
| 1959 | Branik Maribor | 2–1 | Ljubljana | Ljudski vrt |
| 1960 | ŽŠD Maribor | 4–0 | Ljubljana | ŽŠD Ljubljana |
| 1961 | Maribor | 2–1 (a.e.t.) | Slovan | Kodeljevo |
| 1962 | Olimpija | 2–0 | Odred Krim | Bežigrad |
| 1963 | Olimpija | 1–0 | Maribor | Bežigrad |
| 1964 | Kladivar Celje | 3–2 | Olimpija | Bežigrad |
| 1965 | Aluminij | 3–2 | Olimpija | ŽŠD Ljubljana |
| 1966 | Maribor | 1–1 (a.e.t.), (5–0 pen.) | Olimpija | Bežigrad |
| 1967 | Maribor | 2–1 | Olimpija | Bežigrad |
| 1968 | Olimpija | 3–1 | Maribor | Bežigrad |
| 1969 | Olimpija | 1–0 | Maribor | Bežigrad |
| 1970 | Olimpija | 0–0 (a.e.t.), (3–1 pen.) | Maribor | Ljudski vrt |
| 1971 | Olimpija | 4–1 | Maribor | Bežigrad |
| 1972 | Olimpija | 2–1 | Maribor | Ljudski vrt |
| 1972–73 | Maribor | 2–0, 4–1 | Mura | |
| 1973–74 | Maribor | 4–1, 0–1 | Rudar Trbovlje | |
| 1974–75 | Mura | 2–1, 7–3 | Primorje | |
| 1975–76 | Mercator Ljubljana | 0–1, 3–1 | Tabor Sežana | |
| 1976–77 | Maribor | 3–2, 2–0 | Mercator Ljubljana | |
| 1977–78 | Mercator Ljubljana | 3–1 | Rudar Velenje | Bežigrad |
| 1978–79 | Maribor | 1–1 (a.e.t.), (4–1 pen.) | Mercator Ljubljana | Bežigrad |
| 1979–80 | Rudar Velenje | 2–2 (a.e.t.), (4–3 pen.) | Slovan | Žalec Sports Park |
| 1980–81 | Maribor | 4–0 | Naklo | Stanko Mlakar Stadium |
| 1981–82 | Slovan | 4–1 | Rudar Velenje | Kodeljevo |
| 1982–83 | Maribor | 2–1 | Triglav Kranj | Stanko Mlakar Stadium |
| 1983–84 | Triglav Kranj | 1–0 | Maribor | Ljudski vrt |
| 1984–85 | Maribor | 1–0 | Olimpija | Bežigrad |
| 1985–86 | Maribor | 3–3 (a.e.t.), (4–3 pen.) | Slovan | Ljudski vrt |
| 1986–87 | Olimpija | 4–0 | Maribor | Bežigrad |
| 1987–88 | Maribor | 0–0 (a.e.t.), (6–5 pen.) | Olimpija | Ljudski vrt |
| 1988–89 | Maribor | 3–0 | Koper | Bonifika |
| 1989–90 | Koper | 1–1 (a.e.t.), (5–3 pen.) | Rudar Velenje | Ob Jezeru |
| 1990–91 | Koper | 3–1 | Rudar Velenje | Bonifika |

=== Performance by club ===
| Club | Titles | Years won |
|---|---|---|
| Olimpija | 13 | 1953, 1954, 1955, 1956, 1958, 1962, 1963, 1968, 1969, 1970, 1971, 1972, 1987 |
| Maribor | 13 | 1961, 1966, 1967, 1973, 1974, 1977, 1979, 1981, 1983, 1985, 1986, 1988, 1989 |
| Mura | 2 | 1951, 1975 |
| ŽŠD Maribor | 2 | 1957, 1960 |
| Svoboda Ljubljana | 2 | 1976, 1978 |
| Koper | 2 | 1990, 1991 |
| Rudar Trbovlje | 1 | 1952 |
| Branik Maribor | 1 | 1959 |
| Kladivar Celje | 1 | 1964 |
| Aluminij | 1 | 1965 |
| Rudar Velenje | 1 | 1980 |
| Slovan | 1 | 1982 |
| Triglav Kranj | 1 | 1984 |

== Yugoslav Cup ==
| Season | Qualified for the Yugoslav Cup |
|---|---|
| 1947 | Enotnost (via league), Kladivar Celje, Rudar Trbovlje, Garnizija JNA Ljubljana |
| 1948 | Odred (via league), Gorica, Kladivar Celje, Nafta Lendava, Rudar Trbovlje, Železničar Ljubljana, Železničar Maribor, Tržič, Garnizija JNA Radovljica |
| 1949 | Odred (via league), Branik Maribor, Nafta Lendava, Jadran Ljubljana |
| 1950 | Odred, Rudar Trbovlje, Železničar Ljubljana (via league), Branik Maribor, Mura, Gregorčič Jesenice, Garnizija JNA Škofja Loka |
| 1951 | Odred, Rudar Trbovlje, Mura |
| 1952 | Odred, Rudar Trbovlje |
| 1953 | Odred |
| 1954 | Odred |
| 1955 | Odred |
| 1956–57 | Odred |
| 1957–58 | ŽŠD Maribor |
| 1958–59 | Odred |
| 1959–60 | Branik Maribor |
| 1960–61 | ŽŠD Maribor |
| 1961–62 | Maribor |
| 1962–63 | Olimpija, Maribor |
| 1963–64 | Olimpija |
| 1964–65 | Kladivar Celje |
| 1965–66 | Aluminij |
| 1966–67 | Maribor |
| 1967–68 | Maribor |
| 1968–69 | Olimpija |
| 1969–70 | Olimpija |
| 1970–71 | Olimpija |
| 1971–72 | Olimpija |
| 1972 | / (no cup) |
| 1973 | Olimpija (via league), Maribor |
| 1974 | Olimpija (via league), Maribor |
| 1975–76 | Olimpija (via league), Mura |
| 1976–77 | Olimpija (via league), Mercator Ljubljana |
| 1977–78 | Olimpija (via league), Maribor |
| 1978–79 | Olimpija (via league), Mercator Ljubljana |
| 1979–80 | Olimpija (via league), Maribor |
| 1980–81 | Olimpija (via league), Rudar Velenje |
| 1981–82 | Olimpija (via league), Maribor |
| 1982–83 | Olimpija (via league), Slovan |
| 1983–84 | Olimpija (via league), Maribor |
| 1984–85 | Olimpija (via league), Triglav Kranj |
| 1985–86 | Maribor |
| 1986–87 | Maribor |
| 1987–88 | Olimpija |
| 1988–89 | Maribor |
| 1989–90 | Maribor |
| 1990–91 | Olimpija (via league), Koper |
| 1991–92 | Olimpija (via league), Koper – both clubs withdrew before the start |

=== Slovenian clubs in Yugoslav Cup ===
| Club | Seasons | Finals | 1/2 | 1/4 | 1/8 | 1/16 | Lower |
|---|---|---|---|---|---|---|---|
| Enotnost / Odred / Olimpija | 31 | 1 | 1 | 6 | 8 | 11 | 4 |
| Maribor | 14 | | 1 | 2 | 7 | 4 | |
| Rudar Trbovlje | 5 | | | | 1 | | 4 |
| Mura | 3 | | | | 1 | 2 | |
| Železničar Maribor | 3 | | | | 1 | 1 | 1 |
| Kladivar Celje | 3 | | | | 1 | | 2 |
| Branik Maribor | 3 | | | | | 1 | 2 |
| Mercator Ljubljana | 2 | | | | 1 | 1 | |
| Nafta Lendava | 2 | | | | | | 2 |
| Železničar Ljubljana | 2 | | | | | | 2 |
| Aluminij | 1 | | | | 1 | | |
| Koper | 1 | | | | 1 | | |
| Jesenice | 1 | | | | | 1 | |
| Jadran Ljubljana | 1 | | | | | 1 | |
| Rudar Velenje | 1 | | | | | 1 | |
| Slovan | 1 | | | | | 1 | |
| Triglav Kranj | 1 | | | | | 1 | |
| Gorica | 1 | | | | | | 1 |
| Tržič | 1 | | | | | | 1 |
