= SK Rote Elf =

Slovenian football club

Rote Elf
- Full name: Sportklub Rote Elf
- Nickname(s): Rdeča enajsterica (Red Eleven)
- Founded: 1919; 106 years ago
- Dissolved: 1923; 102 years ago
- Ground: Sportplatz Kreuzhofwiese (minor matches); Sportplatz Rapid im Volksgarten (major matches)

Sportklub Rote Elf, commonly referred to as SK Rote Elf or SK Rdeča 11 in the Slovene-language newspapers, was a football club from Maribor. The club was founded in 1919 and competed in the first official season of the Slovenian football, the 1920 Ljubljana Subassociation League. It was renamed to MAK in 1921, before disbanding in 1923.

== History ==
The club known as the Rote Elf already existed prior the World War I, and was one of the two major German sports clubs in the city of Maribor at the time; the other being Marburger Sportvereinigung. After the war, in 1919, the club was reestablished. It remained faithful to its pre-war principles, as the club was non-nationalistic and was based on Austro-Marxism, and is one of the first workers' clubs in the area of Slovene lands. The team was composed of both the German and Slovenian footballers. Rudolf Winkler was the team's captain and is considered as the all-time best player of the club. In 1920, Rote Elf inaugurated their renovated football pitch called Sportplatz Kreuzhofwiese, in a match against Slovan from Ljubljana. However, only less important matches were played there; the team played more important matches at the bigger Sportplatz Rapid im Volksgarten, which was owned by SV Rapid Marburg. In the inaugural season of the Ljubljana Subassociation League in 1920, Rote Elf finished in sixth place out of seven teams.

As the Austro-Marxism lost its sense in the Kingdom of Yugoslavia, it was getting harder and harder for the club to attract footballers from the working class. To solve this problem, the club was renamed to MAK (German: Marburger Athletik Klub; Slovene: Mariborski Atletik Klub) in May 1921, however, this move did not help in achieving better recognition among the players and the citizens of Maribor. The club entered the 1922–23 Ljubljana Subassociation League, but withdrew from the competition in late 1922 and soon ceased all operations.
