= Stanko Tavčar =

Yugoslavian footballer

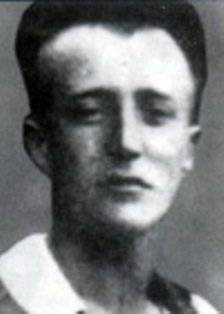

Personal information
- Date of birth: 2 February 1898
- Place of birth: Dobrova, Austro-Hungary
- Date of death: 11 July 1945 (aged 47)
- Place of death: Ljubljana, DF Yugoslavia
- Position: Defender

Senior career*
Years	Team	Apps	(Gls)
1912–1922	ŠK Ilirija		

International career
1920	Yugoslavia	2	(0)
- * Club domestic league appearances and goals

Stanko Tavčar (2 February 1898 in Dobrova, Austro-Hungary – 11 July 1945 in Ljubljana, Yugoslavia) was a Yugoslav footballer and later a medical doctor.

He was the first Slovenian footballer who played in the Yugoslavia national team.

== Football career ==
He was born in Dobrova, near Ljubljana, and spend his entire football career, from 1912 until 1922, playing as defender in ŠK Ilirija Ljubljana winning with them 3 Slovenian football championships. Playing as a full-back, light and with short stature, his main qualities were his great speed and technique making him one of the rare defenders of that period that were able to participate in offensive actions, as well.

He played two matches in the Yugoslavia national team, both of them at the 1920 Summer Olympics tournament in Belgium.

== Post-playing career ==
He studied medicine at Charles University in Prague and after retiring from football, he practiced medicine in Ljubljana, Kranj and Vienna.
