= OFIS Architects =

Slovenian architectural firm

Practice information
- Founders: Rok Oman; Špela Videčnik
- Founded: 1996
- Headquarters: Ljubljana, Slovenia

Website
- www.ofis.si

OFIS arhitekti (OFIS Architects) is an architectural practice based in Ljubljana, Slovenia, founded by Rok Oman and Špela Videčnik.

The work is informed by local traditions and modes of inhabitation across different spatial and cultural contexts.

== History ==
OFIS Architects was established in 1996 during a period of architectural development in Slovenia following the country’s independence. Early work included housing projects, small public buildings and cultural renovations. In the early 2000s the practice gained broader international attention after receiving the Young Architect of the Year Award in London and being selected for Architectural Record’s Design Vanguard list in 2001.

== Projects ==
=== Public ===
- 2025 - Boathouse Bled, Bled, Slovenia
- 2025 - Well of Memory, Stara Fužina, Slovenia
- 2024 - Vintgar Gorge, Vintgar, Slovenia
- 2023 - Football Stadium Ljudski vrt, Maribor, Slovenia
- 2014 - Arena Borisov, Barysaw, Belarus

=== Hospitality ===
- 2025 - Vila Muhr, Bohinj, Slovenia
- 2023 - Hotel AS, Ljubljana, Slovenia
- 2022 - Hotel Bohinj, Bohinj, Slovenia
- 2019 - Living Unit, Milan, Ljubljana, London
- 2018 - Glass House in the Desert, Gorafe, Spain
- 2017 - S1 Tower, Ljubljana, Slovenia

=== Residential ===
- 2025 - Vila Mirje, Ljubljana, Slovenia
- 2024 - Light House, Cres, Croatia
- 2024 - Split Level House, Ljubljana, Slovenia
- 2024 - Frame House, Ljubljana, Slovenia
- 2023 - Ring House, Ljubljana, Slovenia
- 2022 - Peglezen, Ljubljana, Slovenia
- 2022 - Mansion Lom, Kanalski Lom, Slovenia
- 2019 - Step Level House, Ljubljana, Slovenia
- 2019 - House Portico, Ljubljana, Slovenia
- 2017 - Shoebox House, Ljubljana, Slovenia
- 2015 - Villa C-Cross, Ljubljana, Slovenia
- 2015 - Alpine Barn, Bohinj, Slovenia
- 2009 - Alpine Hut, Bohinj, Slovenia
- 2004 - Villa Bled, Bled, Slovenia

=== Mountain shelters ===
- 2016 - Winter Cabin, Kanin, Slovenia
- 2015 - Alpine Shelter, Skuta, Slovenia

=== Housing ===
- 2013 - Basket Apartments, Paris, France
- 2012 - Baroque Court, Ljubljana, Slovenia
- 2011 - Ski Aparments, Kranjska Gora, Slovenia
- 2007 - Hayrack Apartments, Cerklje na Gorenjskem, Slovenia
- 2007 - Tetris Aparments, Ljubljana, Slovenia
- 2005 - Honeycomb Apartments, Izola, Slovenia
- 2000 - Lakeside Apartments, Ljubljana, Slovenia

=== Culture ===
- 2020 - Conservatory for Music and Ballet, Ljubljana, Slovenia
- 2014 - Arvo Pärt Centre, Laulasmaa, Estonia
- 2011 - Space Wheel, Vitanje, Slovenia
- 2010 - Wagner Museum, Bayreuth, Germany
- 2009 - Farewell Chapel, Krasnja, Slovenia
- 2004 - City Museum, Ljubljana, Slovenia

=== Office ===
- 2025 - Celtra NY, New York City, United States
- 2025 - Old Printery, Ljubljana, Slovenia
- 2010 - Hybrid Container, Trata, Slovenia
- 2008 - Snake Squares, Marghera, Italy
- 2003 - U2 Tower, competition, Dublin, Ireland

== Awards and recognition ==
- 2001 - Design Vanguard 2001, architectural record, New York, USA
- 2004 - AR Award for Emerging Architecture commendation, Architectural Review for City Museum
- 2006 - European Grand Prix for innovation awards, Monaco
- 2009 - IOC/IAKS award, silver medal for Football Stadium Maribor
- 2010 - ArchDaily Building of the year 2009, Religious, Farewell Chapel
- 2014 - Archidesign Club Award, Winner for Paris Student Housing, Paris, France
- 2016 - Core77 Design Awards, United States, for Alpine Shelter Skuta
- 2017 - Tourist Architecture Recognition l, for Alpine Barn
- 2025 - Design Educates Awards (DEAwards), Special Recognition for Old Printery
- 2025 - Dedalo Minosse International Prize, Well of Memory

== Publications ==
OFIS has been covered by international newspapers including The New York Times, El País, Der Spiegel and The Guardian, among others. Its work is regularly published by architecture journals and digital platforms including Dezeen, Designboom, Domus, and ArchDaily.

=== Monographs ===
- OFIS FILES 2014-24 Edition Detail (2024)
- OFIS Open Archive Files 98–11, Damdi (2011)
- 2G N'38: OFIS Arhitekti, Gustavo Gili (2006)
