= SK Ljubljana =

- Full name: Sport klub Ljubljana
- Founded: April 1936; 88 years ago
- Dissolved: 1941; 84 years ago
- Ground: Stadion ob Tyrševi cesti
Home colours

Sport klub Ljubljana (English: Ljubljana Sports Club), commonly referred to as SK Ljubljana, was a Slovenian football club from Ljubljana. The club was founded in April 1936 on the basis of football section of ASK Primorje. SK Ljubljana was dissolved in 1941, when the World War II breaks up in Yugoslavia. Although the 1935–36 Yugoslav Championship was played in a cup format, by playing in the semi-finals SK Ljubljana was among the top four clubs, which is the best result ever of a Slovenian club in the Yugoslav highest level.

== History ==
Soon after its formation, SK Ljubljana were the champions of the 1935–36 Ljubljana Subassociation, and as such, they got a spot in the highest national level, the Yugoslav Championship. The 1935–36 Yugoslav Championship was played in a cup format and SK Ljubljana achieved the best ever result of a Slovenian club in the Yugoslav highest level, finishing among the best four. Coached by Gábor Obitz, they won in the round of 16 as Concordia Zagreb withdrew from the tournament. In the quarter-finals, they eliminated Krajišnik Banja Luka by winning 3–1 at home and 4–1 away. Their impressive campaign was only stopped in the semi-finals. Their opponent was BSK Belgrade, who was dominating Yugoslav football in that period and was running for their third consecutive title. BSK won both matches 3–1 and later ended up being champions after beating Slavija Sarajevo in the final.

During the next season, 1936–37, SK Ljubljana again played among the best Yugoslav clubs, however this time the league was played in a two-round robin system which was always used since then, and the result was an eighth place out of ten clubs. Their third consecutive participation in the Yugoslav elite was even worse; Ljubljana finished in ninth place out of ten clubs. The 1938–39 season saw an expansion to twelve clubs and SK Ljubljana, playing their fourth consecutive season in the league, finished in ninth place, in front of relatively inexperienced clubs such as Građanski Skopje, Sparta Zemun and Slavija Varaždin.

The 1939–40 season saw a change in the league format. Two leagues were formed, the Serbian League and the Croato-Slovenian League. The Yugoslav champion was to be decided in a final tournament which was a league formed by the best three clubs of each of the leagues. SK Ljubljana played in the Croato-Slovenian League, however failed to qualify to the final tournament. The 1940–41 season was intended to be played in a similar system, only that the Croato-Slovenian League was separated into a Croatian and Slovenian divisions. SK Ljubljana won the 1940–41 Slovenian League, thus qualifying to the final tournament to decide the Yugoslav champion, however due to the Axis invasion of Yugoslavia and the subsequent entry of the Kingdom of Yugoslavia into the World War II, the final tournament was not played.

== Honours ==
- Ljubljana Subassociation League
  - Winners (2): 1935–36, 1940–41
- Ljubljana Subassociation Cup
  - Winners (1): 1938–39
