= Slovenian Republic Football League =

- Organising body: Football Association of Slovenia
- Founded: 1920; 106 years ago
- Folded: 1991; 35 years ago
- Country: Kingdom of Yugoslavia (1920–1941); Yugoslavia (1946–1991)
- Promotion to: Yugoslav Second League
- Relegation to: Slovenian Zonal League East/West
- Most championships: Ilirija (12 titles)

The Slovenian Republic Football League (Slovene: Slovenska republiška nogometna liga) was the highest football league in Slovenia within the Yugoslav football system.

During the Kingdom of Yugoslavia, the league was known as the Ljubljana Subassociation League (Slovene: Prvenstvo Ljubljanske nogometne podzveze) and was one of the qualifying tournaments for the Yugoslav Championship. During the Yugoslavia era, it was a third-tier league for most of its existence, but in 1988 it became a fourth-tier league. Before that, the winner was promoted to the Yugoslav Second League, and after that it was promoted to the Yugoslav Inter-Republic League. After Slovenia's independence in 1991, the league was transformed into the Slovenian PrvaLiga.

== Winners ==
=== Kingdom of Yugoslavia period ===
Known as the Ljubljana Subassociation League at the time.

Season	Champions
1920	Ilirija
1920–21	Ilirija
1921–22	Ilirija
1922–23	Ilirija
1923–24	Ilirija
1924–25	Ilirija
1925–26	Ilirija
1926–27	Ilirija
1927–28	Primorje
1928–29	Primorje
1929–30	Ilirija
1930–31	I. SSK Maribor
1931–32	Ilirija
1932–33	I. SSK Maribor
1933–34	Ilirija
1934–35	Ilirija
1935–36	SK Ljubljana
1936–37	Železničar Maribor
1937–38	ČSK Čakovec
1938–39	I. SSK Maribor
1939–40	Železničar Maribor
1940–41	SK Ljubljana

=== Yugoslavia period ===
Season	Champions	Clubs playing at a higher level (division)
1946	Lendava	
1946–47	Enotnost	Nafta Lendava (I)
1947–48	Garnizija JLA Ljubljana	Enotnost (II)
1948–49	Železničar Ljubljana	Odred (II)
1950	Korotan Kranj	Odred (II), Rudar Trbovlje, Železničar Ljubljana (III)
1951	Korotan Kranj	Odred, Rudar Trbovlje (II)
1952	Odred	
1952–53	^{West: Korotan Kranj; East: Kladivar Celje}	Odred, Branik Maribor, Železničar Ljubljana, Rudar Trbovlje (IR-II)
1953–54	^{West: Piran; East: Železničar Maribor}	Odred (I), Branik Maribor(II), Ljubljana, Kladivar Celje, Korotan Kranj, Izola (IR-III)
1954–55	^{West: Železničar Gorica; East: Rudar Trbovlje}	Odred (II), Ljubljana, Branik Maribor, ŽŠD Maribor, Kladivar Celje (IR-III)
1955–56	zonal system	Odred, Ljubljana, Branik Maribor, Nova Gorica (II)
1956–57	zonal system	Ljubljana, Odred (II)
1957–58	zonal system	Odred, Branik Maribor, Ljubljana (II)
1958–59	Branik Maribor	Odred (II)
1959–60	Branik Maribor	Odred (II)
1960–61	Maribor	Odred (II)
1961–62	Olimpija	Maribor (II)
1962–63	Ljubljana	Maribor, Olimpija (II)
1963–64	Kladivar Celje	Maribor, Olimpija (II)
1964–65	Slovan	Olimpija, Maribor, Kladivar Celje (II)
1965–66	Aluminij	Olimpija (I), Maribor, Slovan (II)
1966–67	Ljubljana	Olimpija (I), Maribor, Aluminij (II)
1967–68	Ljubljana	Olimpija, Maribor (I), Aluminij (II)
1968–69	Železničar Maribor	Olimpija, Maribor (I), Ljubljana, Mura, Aluminij (II)
1969–70	Mura	Maribor, Olimpija (I), Železničar Maribor, Ljubljana (II)
1970–71	Mercator Ljubljana	Olimpija, Maribor (I), Ljubljana, Železničar Maribor, Mura (II)
1971–72	Rudar Trbovlje	Olimpija, Maribor (I), Mura, Mercator Ljubljana, Ljubljana, Železničar Maribor (II)
1972–73	Železničar Maribor	Olimpija (I), Maribor, Mura, Mercator Ljubljana, Rudar Trbovlje (II)
1973–74	Rudar Trbovlje	Olimpija (I), Maribor, Mura, Mercator Ljubljana (II)
1974–75	Mercator Ljubljana	Olimpija (I), Maribor, Rudar Trbovlje (II)
1975–76	Maribor	Olimpija (I), Mercator Ljubljana(II)
1976–77	Rudar Velenje	Olimpija Ljubljana (I), Maribor, Mercator Ljubljana (II)
1977–78	Mercator Ljubljana	Olimpija (I), Maribor, Rudar Velenje (II)
1978–79	Rudar Trbovlje	Olimpija (I), Maribor, Rudar Velenje, Mercator Ljubljana (II)
1979–80	Mercator Ljubljana	Olimpija (I), Maribor, Rudar Velenje, Rudar Trbovlje (II)
1980–81	Šmartno	Olimpija (I), Maribor, Svoboda, Rudar Velenje (II)
1981–82	Maribor	Olimpija (I), Rudar Velenje, Svoboda (II)
1982–83	Slovan	Olimpija (I), Maribor (II)
1983–84	Maribor	Olimpija (I), Slovan (II)
1984–85	Koper	Olimpija, Maribor (II)
1985–86	Maribor	Koper (II)
1986–87	Olimpija	Maribor (II)
1987–88	Koper	Olimpija (II)
1988–89	Ljubljana	Olimpija (II), Koper, Maribor, Slovan, Rudar Trbovlje (IR-III)
1989–90	Izola	Olimpija (I), Maribor, Koper, Ljubljana (IR-III)
1990–91	Rudar Velenje	Olimpija (I), Izola, Maribor, Koper (IR-III)

== Performance by club ==
Club	Titles	Years won
Ilirija	12	1920, 1921, 1922, 1923, 1924, 1925, 1926, 1927, 1930, 1932, 1934, 1935
Železničar Ljubljana / Ljubljana	5	1949, 1963, 1967, 1968, 1989
Maribor	5	1961, 1976, 1982, 1984, 1986
Železničar Maribor	4	1937, 1940, 1969, 1973
Enotnost / Odred / Olimpija	4	1947, 1952, 1962, 1987
Mercator Ljubljana	4	1971, 1975, 1978, 1980
I. SSK Maribor	3	1931, 1933, 1939
Rudar Trbovlje	3	1972, 1974, 1979
Primorje	2	1928, 1929
SK Ljubljana	2	1936, 1941
Korotan Kranj	2	1950, 1951
Branik Maribor	2	1959, 1960
Slovan	2	1965, 1983
Rudar Velenje	2	1977, 1991
Koper	2	1985, 1988
ČSK Čakovec	1	1938
Lendava	1	1946
Garnizija JLA Ljubljana	1	1948
Kladivar Celje	1	1964
Aluminij	1	1966
Mura	1	1970
Šmartno	1	1981
Izola	1	1990

== Top scorers ==
Season	Player	Goals	Club
1958–59	Feri Maučec	29	Mura
1959–60	Feri Maučec	26	Mura
1960–61	Bogdan Pirc	26	Ljubljana
1961–62	Danilo Brezigar	29	Olimpija
1962–63	Miki Džaferović	23	Ljubljana
1963–64	Drago Devčić	28	Kladivar Celje
1964–65	Ivan Krnič	29	Aluminij
1965–66	Ivan Krnič; Robert Borbaš	23	Aluminij; Branik Maribor
1966–67	Matjaž Zupančič	26	Svoboda
1967–68	Franjo Papec	24	Ljubljana
1968–69	Ivan Purgaj	28	Železničar Maribor
1969–70	Ivan Krnič	19	Aluminij
1970–71	Franc Krojs	18	Branik Maribor
1971–72	Rado Mastnak	16	Slavija
1972–73	Franc Krojs	18	Železničar Maribor
1973–74	Jani Drnovšek	18	Rudar Trbovlje
1974–75	Josip Turčik	21	Mercator Ljubljana
1975–76	Bojan Prašnikar	23	Šmartno
1976–77	Teodor Gregorič	18	Izola
1977–78	Dušan Hvalec	18	Drava Ptuj
1978–79	Dušan Hvalec; Jože Rous	15	Drava Ptuj; Mura
1979–80	Dušan Poljanšek	20	Mercator Ljubljana
1980–81	Bojan Prašnikar	19	Šmartno
1981–82	Bojan Prašnikar	21	Šmartno
1982–83	Bojan Prašnikar	21	Šmartno
1983–84	Milan Bošković	21	Rudar Velenje
1984–85	Miloš Breznikar	27	Rudar Trbovlje
1985–86	Jože Prelogar	30	Maribor
1986–87	Jože Prelogar	17	Olimpija
1987–88	Jani Žlak	17	Rudar Trbovlje
1988–89	Stojan Plešinac	14	Ljubljana
1989–90	Matjaž Cvikl	17	Rudar Velenje
1990–91	Zlatko Herceg	18	Nafta Lendava
