= NK Branik Maribor =

Branik Maribor
- Full name: Nogometni klub Branik Maribor
- Founded: 29 January 1949; 77 years ago
- Dissolved: 11 August 1960; 65 years ago
- Ground: Ljudski vrt
Home colours

Nogometni klub Branik Maribor (English: Branik Maribor Football Club), known as NK Branik or simply Branik, was an association football club based in the city of Maribor. Founded on 29 January 1949 they traced their origin back to 1919 and the establishment of I. SSK Maribor (Slovene: 1. Slovenski Športni Klub Maribor, English: 1. Slovene Sports Club Maribor), an association football club founded by Slovenian youth which ceased all operations due to World War II. NK Branik was disbanded on 11 August 1960 due to the food poisoning affair before their promotional qualifications match for the Yugoslav Second League against Karlovac. The club colours were black and white.

== History ==
=== Origins ===
Similarly to other Slovenian towns (Ljubljana, Celje, Trbovlje) after World War I football boomed in Maribor with the establishment of new clubs, most notably I. SSK Maribor, which was founded in 1919 by Slovenian youth. Together with athletics and tennis, football was one of the main sports departments of the club and in 1920 they received their first football field at the Ljudski vrt area. During the interwar period, I. SSK Maribor was one of the best Slovenian clubs and during the 1930s the club has won three titles in the Slovenian Republic Football League (highest football league in Slovenia within the Yugoslav football system). After the outbreak of World War II Maribor came under the occupation of Nazi Germany and the Nazi regime immediately disbanded all Slovene cultural and sports societies. I. SSK Maribor was particularly affected with dozens of arrests and deportations of their members. The club ceased all operations and many of their members joined in the fight for their fatherland and a total of 51 perished while fighting the Germans between 1941 and 1945. After the war on 19 July 1945 a new club, under the name FD Maribor (Fizkulturno društvo Maribor), was established and stepped in as the successor of the I. SSK Maribor. FD Maribor was later renamed several times and finally became known as SŠD Polet (Sindikalno Športno Društvo Polet) on 20 September 1948.

=== Establishment ===
Due to the difficult situation after World War II several sports departments within SŠD Polet started to organize as individual entities. In late 1940s an initiative led to the establishment of NK Branik. The initiators of the idea wanted to establish an association football club which would become the flagship of the new sport organization, with other sports departments to follow afterwards. Couple of months later, on 29 January 1949, NK Branik was established and in 1951 they became part of the new sport organization, MŠD Branik (Mariborsko Športno Društvo Branik). Black and white were chosen as official colours of the organization, the same as the colours worn by members of I. SSK Maribor. During their first years of operation in early 1950s the club focused all of their efforts in the renovation of the Ljudski vrt area which was devastated during World War II. There the club received their new stadium, opened on 12 July 1952. During their history NK Branik played in the Slovenian Republic Football League. The club has won two titles in the Republic league and was the runner-up on two other occasions.

=== Dissolution and aftermath ===
In 1960, during the promotional qualifications for the Yugoslav Second League, NK Branik was involved in the food poisoning affair before their match against NK Karlovac. As a direct consequence, the club was disbanded on 11 August 1960. Karlovac has won the first leg 2–0, however, one week later in Maribor during their stay in hotel Orel, the whole squad was hospitalised with a severe case of diarrhoea, the players being poisoned ahead of the game: someone had put something in their pancakes. The Croatians returned home before the second leg would be played, leaving 10,000 Branik fans on the stadium waiting in vain for the start of the return match.

How did Karlovac players got sick is unclear to this day. At first the suspects were some of the Branik fans, however, they were acquitted of any guilt by the District court in Maribor. The food testing by the Maribor hygienic institute established that the food served in hotel Orel was not corrupted in any way. Following the procedure at the District court in Maribor, where 40 witnesses from Maribor and Karlovac were questioned, it was established that it was not possible to determine who were responsible for the food poisoning and if it even occurred. At the end, the District Court has acquitted NK Branik of all guilt. Although the true culprit remains unknown to this day – the hosts were disgraced, the club disqualified and disbanded. The officials of NK Branik later established a new club, under the same name, which competed with minor success in the lower Yugoslav leagues and was eventually dissolved in the late 1970s.

After the disbandment of NK Branik the city of Maribor was left without an association football club that would play on a professional level, which was one of the reasons why NK Maribor was established on 12 December 1960. NK Maribor eventually became the most successful club in history of Slovenian football and joined MŠD Branik organization in 1988. Although the club uses only the name NK Maribor in domestic and international competitions it is officially registered as NK Maribor Branik to this day.

== Honours ==
- Slovenian Republic League
  - Champions: 1958–59, 1959–60
- Slovenian Republic Cup
  - Winners: 1959
