= NK Rudar Velenje =

Slovenian football club

Rudar Velenje
- Full name: Nogometni klub Rudar Velenje
- Nicknames: Knapi (The Miners); Zeleno-črni (The Green and Blacks)
- Founded: 1948; 78 years ago
- Ground: Ob Jezeru City Stadium
- Capacity: 1,864
- President: Dajan Pavlović
- Head coach: Damjan Gajser
- League: Slovenian Second League
- 2025–26: Slovenian Second League, 8th of 16
- Website: nkrudarvelenje.com
Home colours	Away colours

Nogometni klub Rudar Velenje (lit. 'Rudar Velenje Football Club'), commonly referred to as NK Rudar Velenje or simply Rudar Velenje, is a Slovenian football club from Velenje which competes in the Slovenian Second League, the second tier of the Slovenian football league system.

== History ==
The club was founded in August 1948. Initially, they played in local MNZ Celje league, until they qualified for the Slovenian Republic League in 1953. Two years later, on 3 July 1955, Rudar's home stadium Ob Jezeru was opened and the club moved to its current home. After the short crisis, the club returned to the Slovenian league in 1962. For the 1974–75 season the club hired a professional coach Živko Stakič and became Slovenian champions in 1977. Rudar therefore qualified for the Yugoslav Second League, where they played until 1982. Just before the breakup of Yugoslavia, Rudar became the Slovenian champion for the second time in 1991.

After the Slovenian independence, Rudar became a regular participant in the Slovenian PrvaLiga. They were relegated to the Slovenian Second League in 2003 and returned for the 2005–06 season, but were instantly relegated back to second level. In the 2007–08 season they finished first and thus achieved a promotion back to the first league. The club's highest finish was third place on four occasions, the last time in 2014, when Mate Eterović, Rudar's striker, also became league's topscorer. Their biggest success was winning the Slovenian Cup in 1998, when they lost first game away to Primorje, but then won 3–0 in front of home crowd in the second leg. Rudar therefore played in the last edition of UEFA Cup Winners' Cup, where it was eliminated by Varteks in the first round.

== Honours ==
=== Yugoslavia ===
- Slovenian Republic League
  - Winners: 1976–77, 1990–91
- Slovenian Republic Cup
  - Winners: 1979–80

=== Slovenia ===
- Slovenian Second League
  - Winners: 2003–04, 2004–05, 2007–08
- Slovenian Cup
  - Winners: 1997–98
- MNZ Celje Cup
  - Winners: 1991–92, 2003–04, 2004–05

== Domestic league and cup results ==
Season	League	Position	Pts	P	W	D	L	GF	GA	Cup
1991–92	1. SNL	12	38	40	13	12	15	59	65	Quarter-finals
1992–93	1. SNL	9	33	34	13	7	14	45	52	First round
1993–94	1. SNL	9	27	30	10	7	13	37	49	Round of 16
1994–95	1. SNL	7	38	30	16	6	8	55	33	Quarter-finals
1995–96	1. SNL	7	49	36	13	10	13	46	37	Semi-finals
1996–97	1. SNL	8	42	36	10	12	14	43	53	Round of 16
1997–98	1. SNL	7	43	36	10	13	13	39	38	Winners
1998–99	1. SNL	3	56	33	16	8	9	43	33	Quarter-finals
1999–2000	1. SNL	3	58	33	17	7	9	49	35	First round
2000–01	1. SNL	8	43	33	12	7	14	43	44	Semi-finals
2001–02	1. SNL	8	42	33	11	9	13	46	52	Quarter-finals
2002–03	1. SNL	11	25	31	6	7	18	32	51	First round
2003–04	2. SNL	1 (Note: Declined promotion.)	69	32	21	6	5	84	37	Quarter-finals
2004–05	2. SNL	1↑	72	33	23	3	7	76	40	Second round
2005–06	1. SNL	10↓	15	36	2	9	25	28	83	Quarter-finals
2006–07	2. SNL	8	45	36	12	9	15	45	59	Quarter-finals
2007–08	2. SNL	1↑	50	27	15	4	7	70	31	did not qualify
2008–09	1. SNL	3	55	36	16	7	13	44	39	Quarter-finals
2009–10	1. SNL	7	49	36	15	4	17	46	52	Quarter-finals
2010–11	1. SNL	6	46	36	12	10	14	58	50	Second round
2011–12	1. SNL	6	43	36	11	10	15	55	54	Semi-final
2012–13	1. SNL	7	40	36	11	7	18	42	59	Round of 16
2013–14	1. SNL	3	63	36	18	9	9	55	33	Semi-finals
2014–15	1. SNL	6	46	36	12	10	14	44	43	Round of 16
2015–16	1. SNL	7	41	36	11	8	17	34	52	Quarter-finals
2016–17	1. SNL	7	41	36	10	11	15	49	53	Quarter-finals
2017–18	1. SNL	4	50	36	15	5	16	50	49	First round
2018–19	1. SNL	7	43	36	12	7	17	50	73	Round of 16
2019–20	1. SNL	10↓	12	36	0	12	24	28	80	Quarter-finals
2020–21	2. SNL	8	26	22	7	5	10	24	34	Round of 16
2021–22	2. SNL	5	49	30	16	1	13	51	43	did not qualify
2022–23	2. SNL	13	32	30	7	11	12	41	51	Round of 16
2023–24	2. SNL	8	37	30	10	7	13	33	49	Round of 32
2024–25	2. SNL	13	32	30	7	11	12	27	44	Round of 32
2025–26	2. SNL	8	37	30	9	10	11	46	39	Round of 16

Notes

Key

- P – Matches played
- W – Matches won
- D – Matches drawn
- L – Matches lost
- GF – Goals for
- GA – Goals against
- Pts – Points

Winners	Runners-up	Promoted ↑	Relegated ↓

== UEFA competitions ==
All results (home and away) list Rudar's goal tally first.

Season	Competition	Round	Opponent	Home	Away	Aggregate
1995	UEFA Intertoto Cup	GR2	(England) Tottenham Hotspur	1–2	–	5th place
1995	UEFA Intertoto Cup	GR2	(Sweden) Öster	–	1–3	5th place
1995	UEFA Intertoto Cup	GR2	(Germany) 1. FC Köln	0–1	–	5th place
1995	UEFA Intertoto Cup	GR2	(Switzerland) Lucerne	–	1–1	5th place
1998–99	UEFA Cup Winners' Cup	QR	(Moldova) Constructorul Chișinău	2–0	0–0	2–0
1998–99	UEFA Cup Winners' Cup	R1	(Croatia) Varteks	0–1	0–1	0–2
1999	UEFA Intertoto Cup	R1	(Sweden) Halmstads BK	0–0	2–2	2–2 (a)
1999	UEFA Intertoto Cup	R2	Austria Lustenau	1–2	1–2	2–4
2009–10	UEFA Europa League	QR1	(Estonia) Narva Trans	3–1	3–0	6–1
2009–10	UEFA Europa League	QR2	(Serbia) Red Star Belgrade	0–1	0–4	0–5
2014–15	UEFA Europa League	QR1	(Albania) Laçi	1–1	1–1	2–2 (2–3 pen.)
2018–19	UEFA Europa League	QR1	(San Marino) Tre Fiori	7–0	3–0	10–0
2018–19	UEFA Europa League	QR2	(Romania) FCSB	0–2	0–4	0–6

GR2 = Group 2; QR = Qualifying round; R1 = First round; R2 = Second round; QR1 = First qualifying round; QR2 = Second qualifying round.
