= NK Krim =

Slovenian football club

Krim
- Full name: Nogometni klub Krim
- Founded: 1945; 81 years ago
- Ground: Igrišče Krim
- Website: nkkrim.si
Home colours	Away colours

Nogometni klub Krim (English: Krim Football Club), commonly referred to as NK Krim or simply Krim, is a Slovenian football club from Ljubljana, which currently competes only with youth selections. The club was founded in 1945. It was known as Jadran Ljubljana in 1949 and as Odred-Krim between 1961 and 1964. They won the Ljubljana-Littoral League in 1957 and 1958, and were the Slovenian Republic Cup runners-up in 1962.
