= NK Olimp Celje =

Olimp
- Full name: Nogometni Klub Olimp Celje
- Founded: 1928; 98 years ago
- Dissolved: 1989; 37 years ago
- Ground: Olimp Stadium, Celje
- Capacity: 1,000
Home colours

Nogometni Klub Olimp Celje (English: Olimp Celje Football Club), commonly referred to as NK Olimp or simply Olimp, was a Slovenian football club from Celje. The club was founded in 1928. Their home ground still exists and is used as a training facility for NK Celje.
