= SK Jadran =

Jadran
- Full name: Športni klub Jadran
- Founded: 1920; 105 years ago
Home colours

Športni klub Jadran, commonly referred to as SK Jadran or simply Jadran, was a football club from Ljubljana. The club was founded in 1920 and primarily wore black and white kits. Just before the start of World War II in Yugoslavia, the club merged with SK Reka.

In the 1923–24 Ljubljana Subassociation League season, Jadran finished third behind Ilirija and Hermes.
