= ASK Primorje =

- Full name: Akademski sportni klub Primorje
- Founded: 9 May 1920; 106 years ago
- Dissolved: 1936; 90 years ago
- Ground: Stadion ob Tyrševi cesti
Home colours

Akademski sportni klub Primorje (English: Primorje Academic Sports Club), commonly referred to as ASK Primorje or simply Primorje, was a Slovenian football club from Ljubljana. The club was founded in May 1920 by the diaspora from the Slovene Littoral, with Franc Batjel being appointed the first president of the club. It was dissolved in 1936, when it merged into a newly formed SK Ljubljana.

== Honours ==
League

- Ljubljana Subassociation League

Winners (2): 1927–28, 1928–29
Runners-up (1): 1931–32
