= I. SSK Maribor =

- Full name: 1. slovenski športni klub Maribor
- Founded: 28 June 1919; 105 years ago
- Dissolved: 1941; 84 years ago
- Ground: Ljudski vrt
Home colours

1. slovenski športni klub Maribor (English: First Slovene Sports Club Maribor) or simply I. SSK Maribor was a football club from Maribor. The club was founded in 1919. I. SSK Maribor had a fierce rivalry with NK Železničar Maribor.

== History ==
The club was founded on 28 June 1919 by Ivo Vauda, who was the best Slovenian footballer in Maribor at the time. Drago Kolbl was the first president of the club. I. SSK Maribor was considered as the successor of ŠD Maribor. The first match was played on 11 July 1919 against the German-based team from Maribor, SK Hertha, which I. SSK Maribor won 2–1. The first official competitive match was played against another German-based team from Maribor, Rapid. Rapid won the first game 5–0, but in the second game, I. SSK Maribor won 2–1. The first international match was played on 1 July 1922 against Grazer AK. The match ended in a 2–2 draw. After finishing as the runners-up on six occasions, they have finally won the Ljubljana Subassociation League for the first time in the 1930–31 season. They have won another two titles in the 1932–33 and 1938–39 seasons. The club was dissolved at the beginning of the World War II in Yugoslavia.

== Stadium ==
The club did not have its own ground until 1920, when the players helped to create a football pitch at the Ljudski vrt area.

== Honours ==
- Ljubljana Subassociation League
  - Winners (3): 1930–31, 1932–33, 1938–39
  - Runners-up (7): 1921–22, 1922–23, 1923–24, 1927–28, 1928–29, 1929–30, 1939–40
- Ljubljana Subassociation Cup
  - Winners (2): 1925, 1929
  - Runners-up (2): 1926, 1938–39
