= SV Rapid Marburg =

Rapid Marburg
- Full name: Sportvereinigung Rapid Marburg
- Nickname(s): Rapidlerji; Črno-modri (The Black and Blues)
- Founded: March 1919; 106 years ago
- Dissolved: mid-1940s
- Ground: Sportplatz Rapid im Volksgarten (1920–1927); Poljane Sports Complex (1928–1940s)
Home colours

Sportvereinigung Rapid Marburg, commonly referred to as SV Rapid Marburg or simply Rapid, was a football club from Maribor. The club was founded in 1919 by the Germans of Maribor and was the five-time runner-up of the Ljubljana Subassociation League.

== History ==
In late 1918, the first aspirations to establish a new German football club in Maribor emerged. In March 1919, Sportvereinigung Rapid was officially founded with Franz Rueß becoming the first club president. When the Football Association of Yugoslavia was founded in April 1919, Rapid became one of the first clubs to join the association. After one year, Rueß resigned and was replaced by Walter Thalmann, who in January 1920 signed a contract with the Maribor's city authorities to obtain a football field at the Ljudski vrt area for the next ten years. After the thorough renovations, the new pitch was opened on 9 May 1920 in a match between Rapid and Slovan, which Slovan won 4–2. In the inaugural season of the Ljubljana Subassociation League in 1920, Rapid finished as runners-up behind Ilirija from Ljubljana. In the next few years, from 1921 to 1924, Rapid always finished behind their city rivals I. SSK Maribor in the Maribor subdivision, and therefore failed to qualify for the play-offs. Yet, in the next three seasons, Rapid reached the final again, but lost to Ilirija on all three occasions.

In 1927, the club was affected by financial problems and was almost disbanded. A year later, Rapid moved to the newly built Poljane Sports Complex; the reason why Rapid left the Ljudski vrt area, despite having a ten-year rental agreement, is unknown. In the 1932–33 season, Rapid once again finished as runners-up of the league behind I. SSK Maribor. During World War II, Rapid competed in the Styrian league competitions organised by Nazi Germany. The club was disbanded after the war, when the German Army left Maribor.

== Honours ==
- Ljubljana Subassociation League

Runners-up (5): 1920, 1924–25, 1925–26, 1926–27, 1932–33

- Ljubljana Subassociation Cup

Runners-up (1): 1928
