= Athletik SK =

Athletik Sportklub
- Full name: Athletik Sportklub Cilli
- Nickname(s): Atletiki / Athletiker (The Athletes)
- Founded: 1906; 119 years ago
- Dissolved: 1941; 84 years ago
- Ground: Sportplatz Felsenkeller
Home colours

Athletik Sportklub, commonly referred to as Athletik SK or simply Athletik, was a Slovenian football club from Celje. The club was founded in 1906 by the Germans of Celje. It was also referred to as Cillier Sportverein in the first part of the 1920 season.

Austrian striker Karl Dürschmied served as the club's player-coach in 1921 and accepted to play for the Ljubljana Football Subassociation in a friendly exhibition game against the France national team, which is often considered the first match of the Slovenia national team.

== Honours ==
- Ljubljana Subassociation League

Runners-up (1): 1920–21

- Ljubljana Subassociation Cup

Winners (1): 1930
Runners-up (1): 1927
