= ND Ilirija 1911 =

Slovenian football club

Ilirija 1911
- Full name: Nogometno društvo Ilirija 1911
- Founded: 9 June 1911; 115 years ago
- Ground: Ilirija Sports Park
- Capacity: 1,000
- President: Marjan Dermastija
- Head coach: Sanel Konjević
- League: Slovenian Second League
- 2025–26: Slovenian Second League, 13th of 16
- Website: www.ilirija1911.com
Home colours	Away colours

Nogometno društvo Ilirija 1911 is a Slovenian football club based in Ljubljana, the Slovenian capital, that competes in the Slovenian Second League, the second tier of football in the country. The club was founded in June 1911 and is the oldest still active football club in the country.

== History ==
=== SK Ilirija (1911–1941) ===
At the beginning of the 20th century, football came to Ljubljana from Vienna and was played mostly by the students. Football club Ilirija was founded on 9 June 1911 in a pub called Roža on Židovska cesta in Ljubljana. Albin Kandare was elected as the first president of Ilirija, and their first ground was at Tivoli Park. Ilirija's first match was played on 30 July 1911, and ended in an 18–0 defeat against Hermes, the local students' club which had been founded in 1910. Soon after their first match Ilirija merged with Hermes in 1913. In the first few years Ilirija had no competition in Slovenia and they mainly played friendly matches against Zagreb-based Croatian clubs such as HAŠK, Građanski and Concordia. An important turning point was a friendly with the Czech side Slavia Prague in Ljubljana played on 5 August 1913, which Ilirija lost 10–0. However, Ilirija's players and staff were impressed by Slavia's display of professionally trained football so much that they convinced Slavia's player Jirkovský to stay in Ljubljana and work as Ilirija's first manager after the match. The best and most popular players of Ilirija of that time were Stanko Tavčar, Ernest Turk, Stanko Pelan and Oto Oman.

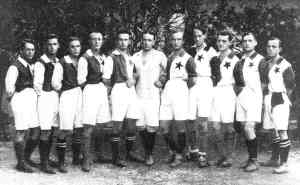
SK Ilirija squad, which won the first Slovenian regional championship in 1920.

At the onset of World War I, Ilirija and Slovan (founded in 1913 and still active today) were the only two football clubs in Slovenia, and during the war all football activities were suspended. In 1919 Ilirija was re-activated, and was soon followed by Slovan. Football rapidly gained popularity and a number of other Slovenian clubs came into life around the same time such as Olimp in Celje, I. SSK Maribor in Maribor and AŠK Primorje in Ljubljana, with the latter becoming Ilirija's biggest rivals in the following decade.

Ilirija then became the first regional champions of Slovenia (which was at the time part of the Kingdom of Yugoslavia), winning the inaugural Slovenian championship in 1920, and proceeded to win a total of 12 Slovenian titles between 1920 and 1935. By the mid-1930s both Ilirija and Primorje encountered financial difficulties which led to their merger and the formation of SK Ljubljana football club in 1936. Between 1936 and 1941 SK Ljubljana was one of the top sides in Slovenia (winning the 1935–36 and 1940–41 Slovenian championships) and also competed in the Yugoslav First League, Kingdom of Yugoslavia's top national competition formed in 1923. In addition, Ilirija's Stanko Tavčar was the first Slovenian player who was capped for the Kingdom of Yugoslavia national football team in the period between the two world wars. He was member of their 1920 Olympics squad and appeared in matches against Czechoslovakia and Egypt, the first two games in the history of the team. SK Ljubljana operated until 1941 and the outbreak of World War II, when all sports activities in Ljubljana were suspended.

=== NK Ilirija (1950–1991) ===
After World War II, the club was re-established in 1950 with the help of some pre-war former players. They were now located on the outskirts of Ljubljana in Zgornja Šiška, where they built their stadium in 1963. They played mostly in the Slovenian Republic League, the third-tier of Yugoslav football. Their biggest success was finishing as runners-up in 1972. The team, consisting of Jerebic, Rojina, Šmon, Erjavec, Kolenc, Dermastija, Godler, Ahlin, Filip, Jalšavec, Jesenšek, Daneu and Prelovšek, therefore competed for the Yugoslav amateur championship that year, but lost in the final to Vrbas. In 1986, Ilirija was relegated from the Republic League and continued to play in local regional leagues until the breakup of Yugoslavia.

=== Since 1991 ===
After Slovenia's independence in 1991, Ilirija played a couple of seasons in the newly established Slovenian Second League. In the 1992–93 season, they finished 15th and were subsequently relegated to the Slovenian Third League. Since then, Ilirja competed in leagues outside of the top two divisions until 2017, when they returned to the Slovenian Second League.

== Colours and crest ==
Ilirija's original kit

The traditional colours of Ilirija are green and white, the colours strongly associated with the city of Ljubljana. Although green and white have been the club's colours since the beginning, in its early years Ilirija usually wore red and white jerseys with a star, a tribute to Slavia Prague.

The club crest depicts a name, foundation year and a column in doric order. The name itself is a reference to the historical region of Illyria.

== Stadium ==
In the interwar period, Ilirija played its home matches on the field by Celovška Road, which was built in 1919 and was located between the State Station and the Union Brewery. After World War II, Ilirija moved to Ilirija Sports Park, where the club's current home ground was built in 1963. It has a capacity of 1,000 and is the third largest stadium in Ljubljana. Apart from football, it also hosted speedway events between 1963 and 2020.

== Honours ==
=== Yugoslavia ===
- Ljubljana Subassociation League
  - Winners: 1920, 1920–21, 1921–22, 1922–23, 1923–24, 1924–25, 1925–26, 1926–27, 1929–30, 1931–32, 1933–34, 1934–35
- Ljubljana Subassociation Cup
  - Winners: 1926, 1927, 1928

=== Slovenia ===
- Slovenian Third League
  - Winners: 2015–16, 2020–21
- Slovenian Fourth Division
  - Winners: 1995–96
- Slovenian Fifth Division
  - Winners: 2003–04, 2012–13
- MNZ Ljubljana Cup
  - Winners: 2016–17

== League history since 1991 ==
Season	League	Position	Notes
1991–92	2. SNL – West	3rd	
1992–93	2. SNL	15th	Relegated to Slovenian Third League
1993–94	3. SNL – West	13th	Relegated to Ljubljana League
1994–95	Ljubljana League	2nd	
1995–96	Ljubljana League	1st	Promoted to Slovenian Third League
1996–97	3. SNL – West	14th	Relegated
1997–2002	Did not enter any competition		
2002–03	MNZ Ljubljana (level 5)	2nd	
2003–04	MNZ Ljubljana (level 5)	1st	Promoted to Ljubljana Regional League
2004–05	Ljubljana Regional League	10th	
2005–06	Ljubljana Regional League	9th	
2006–07	Ljubljana Regional League	11th	
2007–08	Ljubljana Regional League	14th	Relegated
2008–2011	Did not enter any competition		
2011–12	MNZ Ljubljana (level 5)	4th	
2012–13	MNZ Ljubljana (level 5)	1st	Promoted to Ljubljana Regional League
2013–14	Ljubljana Regional League	2nd	Promoted to Slovenian Third League
2014–15	3. SNL – Centre	2nd	
2015–16	3. SNL – Centre	1st	Lost promotion play-offs for 2. SNL
2016–17	3. SNL – Centre	2nd	Promoted to Slovenian Second League
2017–18	2. SNL	8th	
2018–19	2. SNL	15th	Relegated to Slovenian Third League
2019–20	3. SNL – West	9th	
2020–21	3. SNL – West	1st	Promoted to Slovenian Second League
2021–22	2. SNL	10th	
2022–23	2. SNL	3rd	
2023–24	2. SNL	14th	
2024–25	2. SNL	14th	
2025–26	2. SNL	13th	
