= NK Izola =

Slovenian football club

Izola
- Full name: Nogometni klub Izola
- Nickname(s): Ribiči (The Fishermen)
- Founded: 1923; 102 years ago
- Dissolved: 1996; 29 years ago
- Ground: Izola City Stadium
Home colours	Away colours

Nogometni klub Izola (English: Izola Football Club), commonly referred to as NK Izola or simply Izola, was a Slovenian football club from Izola. They played in the Slovenian top division for five consecutive seasons during the early 1990s. The club was dissolved after the 1995–96 Slovenian PrvaLiga season.

== History ==
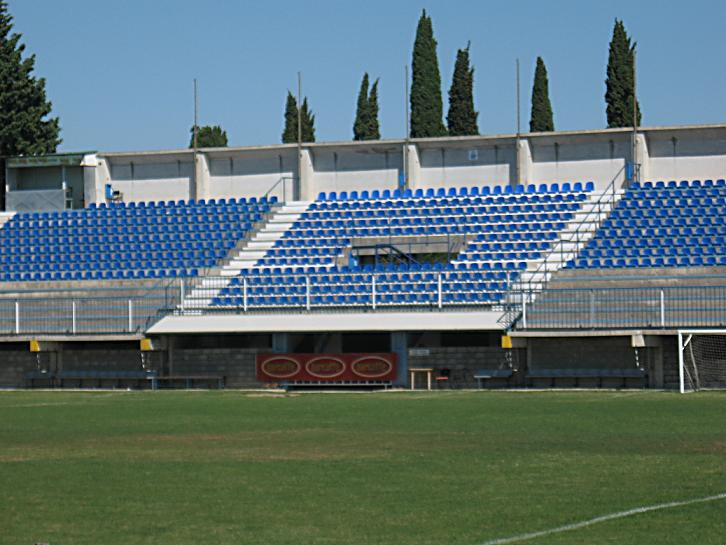
Izola City Stadium

The club was founded in 1923 as Club Calcistico Giovanile Isola d'Istria, when the city of Isola was part of Italy. It was known as Ampelea Isola d'Istria between 1930 and 1946, and played in Serie C between 1937 and 1946. Italian internationals Giuseppe Grezar, Alberto Eliani and Aredio Gimona played with Ampelea in the 1943–44 season. Due to the occupation of Istria and the Trieste territory by the Yugoslav Army, it was forced to change its name to the more proletarian sounding Unione Sportiva Isola, and finally to NK Izola in 1951.

The club was dissolved after the 1995–96 Slovenian PrvaLiga season due to financial problems. A successor club was established in 1996 under the name MNK Izola.

== Honours ==
- Slovenian Republic League
  - Winners: 1989–90

== European football ==
Izola played in the 1992–93 UEFA Cup, losing to Benfica.
