= NK Rudar Trbovlje =

Slovenian football club

Rudar Trbovlje
- Full name: Nogometni klub Rudar Trbovlje
- Nicknames: Knapi (The Miners); Zeleno-črni (The Green and Blacks)
- Founded: 1922; 104 years ago (as ŠK Zora)
- Ground: Rudar Sports Park
- Capacity: 1,000
- President: Denis Bolte
- Head coach: Miloš Breznikar
- League: 3. SNL – West
- 2025–26: 3. SNL – West, 6th of 14
- Website: www.nkrudar.si
Home colours	Away colours

Nogometni klub Rudar Trbovlje (English: Rudar Trbovlje Football Club) or simply NK Rudar Trbovlje is a Slovenian football club from Trbovlje that competes in the Slovenian Third League, the third tier of the Slovenian football system. The club have a long-standing local rivalry with NK Zagorje, which is known as the Zasavje Derby.

In the 1970s, the club won the then highest league in Slovenia, the Slovenian Republic League, three times.

== History ==
The history of football in Trbovlje dates back to 1922, when ŠK Zora was established. In the same year, the club aroused a lot of interest in this sport among youth working class. In 1924, the club was banned after a political clash with Orjuna. Some former members then founded DSK Svoboda, which renamed as SK Amater in 1927.

In 1972, on the 50th anniversary of the club, they won the Slovenian Republic League for the first time. A successful period lasted until 1980, as Rudar won the Republic titles two more times between 1974 and 1979.

With the collapse of Yugoslavia and the independence of Slovenia, all Slovenian teams returned from the federal leagues. Some of the key players left the club and Rudar was relegated from the newly established Slovenian PrvaLiga in the inaugural 1991–92 season. They never returned to the first division.

== Honours ==
- Slovenian Republic League (third tier in Yugoslavia)
  - Winners: 1971–72, 1973–74, 1978–79
- Ljubljana Regional League (fourth tier in Slovenia)
  - Winners: 2011–12, 2023–24
- Slovenian Republic Cup
  - Winners: 1952
- MNZ Ljubljana Cup
  - Winners: 1993
