= 1993–94 Slovenian Football Cup =

Tournament details
- Country: Slovenia
- Teams: 32

Final positions
- Champions: Maribor (2nd title)
- Runners-up: Mura

Tournament statistics
- Matches played: 38
- Goals scored: 113 (2.97 per match)

The 1993–94 Slovenian Football Cup was the third season of the Slovenian Football Cup, Slovenia's football knockout competition.

== Qualified clubs ==
=== 1992–93 Slovenian PrvaLiga members ===
- Beltinci
- Celje
- Gorica
- Izola
- Koper
- Krka
- Ljubljana
- Maribor
- Mura
- Nafta Lendava
- Naklo
- Olimpija
- Rudar Velenje
- Slovan
- Steklar
- Svoboda
- Zagorje
- Železničar Maribor

=== Qualified through MNZ Regional Cups ===
- MNZ Ljubljana: Rudar Trbovlje, Šmartno Ljubljana
- MNZ Maribor: Dravograd, Rače
- MNZ Celje: Šmartno ob Paki
- MNZ Koper: Jadran Dekani
- MNZ Nova Gorica: Primorje
- MNZ Murska Sobota: Veržej, Rogašovci
- MNZ Lendava: Turnišče
- MNZG-Kranj: Jesenice, Lesce
- MNZ Ptuj: Drava Ptuj, Aluminij

== First round ==
The first round matches took place on 22 and 23 September 1993.

Team 1	Score	Team 2
Drava Ptuj	1–8	Izola
Maribor	2–0	Ljubljana
Železničar Maribor	1–2	Steklar
Rače	2–2 (3–4 p)	Jadran Dekani
Aluminij	2–2 (2–4 p)	Rudar Trbovlje
Dravograd	1–4	Rudar Velenje
Rogašovci	1–2	Slovan
Turnišče	0–1	Šmartno Ljubljana
Celje	2–0	Primorje
Beltinci	3–0	Svoboda
Lesce	0–2	Mura
Zagorje	2–2 (3–2 p)	Nafta Lendava
Jesenice	0–3 (w/o)	Veržej
Krka	2–1	Šmartno ob Paki
Gorica	2–4	Olimpija
Naklo	3–2	Koper

== Round of 16 ==
The round of 16 matches took place between 26 October and 2 November 1993.

26 October 1993	Šmartno Ljubljana	0–4	Krka	Ljubljana
			A. Prime 30'; Pirc 31'; Bracovič 80'; Mesojedec 85' (pen.)	Stadium: Šmartno Field; Attendance: 300; Referee: Stevo Govedarević

26 October 1993	Izola	1–1 (3–4 p)	Beltinci	Izola
	Želko 72'		Škaper 70'	Stadium: Izola City Stadium; Attendance: 400; Referee: Štefan Tivold
	Penalties
	Želko (penalty scored); Gregorič (penalty scored); Tosič (penalty scored)		(penalty scored) Šarkezi; (penalty scored) Škaper; (penalty scored) Dzafič; (penalty scored) Pek

27 October 1993	Mura	2–0	Celje	Murska Sobota
	Gliha 34' (pen.), 49'			Stadium: Fazanerija City Stadium; Attendance: 1,500; Referee: Srečko Kandare

27 October 1993	Rudar Velenje	1–3	Maribor	Velenje
	Spasojević 56' (pen.)		Karić 7'; Bozgo 37'; Šimundža 85'	Stadium: Ob Jezeru City Stadium; Attendance: 800; Referee: Anton Beton

27 October 1993	Rudar Trbovlje	2–0	Jadran Dekani	Trbovlje
	Sotenšek 55'; Vastič 63'			Stadium: Rudar Stadium; Attendance: 300; Referee: Slavko Špilar

27 October 1993	Steklar	2–1	Zagorje	Rogaška Slatina
	Kukić 71'		Holešek 55'; Vickovič 90'	Stadium: Steklar Field; Attendance: 200; Referee: Silvo Borošak

27 October 1993	Slovan	1–4	Naklo	Ljubljana
	Stojanovič 90'		Jerina 47'; Grašič 63'; Vorobyov 71'; Oblak 85'	Stadium: Kodeljevo Sports Park; Attendance: 300; Referee: Zoran Novarlić

2 November 1993	Veržej	0–2	Olimpija	Veržej
			Benedejčič 13'; Pavlin 19'	Stadium: Beltrans Field; Attendance: 600; Referee: Jože Klinc

== Quarter-finals ==
The first legs of the quarter-finals took place on 10 November, and the second legs took place on 24 November 1993.

=== First legs ===
10 November 1993	Olimpija	1–0	Naklo	Ljubljana
	Zulič 82'			Stadium: Bežigrad Stadium; Attendance: 1,500; Referee: Žarko Hvalič

10 November 1993	Steklar	1–0	Krka	Rogaška Slatina
	Vickovič 64'			Stadium: Steklar Field; Attendance: 200; Referee: Branko Žohar

10 November 1993	Rudar Trbovlje	0–1	Mura	Trbovlje
			Gutalj 34'	Stadium: Rudar Stadium; Attendance: 600; Referee: Josip Jakopiček

10 November 1993	Beltinci	2–4	Maribor	Beltinci
	Škaper 35', 82' (pen.)		Šimundža 39'; Bozgo 47'; Pešić 50'; Dvoršak 85'	Stadium: Potrošnik Field; Attendance: 1,200; Referee: Štefan Tivold

=== Second legs ===
24 November 1993	Naklo	0–0 (0–1 agg.)	Olimpija	Kranj
				Stadium: Kranj Sports Park; Attendance: 800; Referee: Darko Jamšek

24 November 1993	Krka	1–0 (1–1 agg.) (5–4 p)	Steklar	Novo Mesto
	A. Prime 67'			Stadium: Portoval; Attendance: 300; Referee: Žarko Hvalič
	Penalties
	Mesojedec (penalty scored); Gruden (penalty scored); Perše (penalty scored); Milanović (penalty scored); A. Prime (penalty scored)		(penalty scored) Korazija; (penalty scored) Horvat; (penalty scored) Kukić; (penalty scored) Pek

24 November 1993	Mura	2–1 (3–1 agg.)	Rudar Trbovlje	Murska Sobota
	Breznik 4'; Gliha 40' (pen.)		Žlak 89'	Stadium: Fazanerija City Stadium; Attendance: 600; Referee: Zoran Novarlić

24 November 1993	Maribor	4–1 (8–3 agg.)	Beltinci	Maribor
	Šimundža 3'; Stanić 27'; Širec 64'; Bozgo 70'		Dzafič 9'	Stadium: Ljudski vrt Attendance: 500; Referee: Danilo Kolarič

== Semi-finals ==
The first legs of the semi-finals took place on 20 April, and the second legs took place on 11 May 1994.

=== First legs ===
20 April 1994	Maribor	1–0	Krka	Maribor
	Bozgo 1' (pen.)			Stadium: Ljudski vrt Attendance: 2,000; Referee: Štefan Tivold

20 April 1994	Olimpija	1–2	Mura	Ljubljana
	Djuranović 28'		Kokol 5'; Belec 88'	Stadium: Bežigrad Stadium; Attendance: 2,500; Referee: Žarko Vidali

=== Second legs ===
11 May 1994	Krka	0–5 (0–6 agg.)	Maribor	Novo Mesto
			Djurovski 17'; Bozgo 20', 45' (pen.); Lukič 88'; Šimundža 89'	Stadium: Portoval; Attendance: 600; Referee: Vili Kranjc

11 May 1994	Mura	1–0 (3–1 agg.)	Olimpija	Murska Sobota
	Gliha 73'			Stadium: Fazanerija City Stadium; Attendance: 5,500; Referee: Štefan Tivold

== Final ==
=== First leg ===
8 June 1994
17:30 CEST

Mura	1–0	Maribor
Kokol 20'	Report

Fazanerija, Murska Sobota
Attendance: 6,000
Referee: Štefan Tivold

=== Second leg ===
15 June 1994
17:00 CEST

Maribor	3–1	Mura
Binkovski 27'; Stanić 53'; Bozgo 67'	Report	Belec 80'

Ljudski vrt, Maribor
Attendance: 10,000
Referee: Milan Mitrovič

Maribor won 3–2 on aggregate.
