= 1952–53 Slovenian Republic League =

Slovenian Republic League
- Season: 1952–53
- Champions: Celje; Korotan Kranj
- Relegated: Kovinar Maribor; Sloga Ljubljana
- Matches played: 112
- Goals scored: 576 (5.14 per match)

== East table ==
Pos	Team	Pld	W	D	L	GF	GA	GD	Pts
1	Kladivar Celje	14	12	1	1	86	17	+69	25
2	Železničar Maribor	14	11	1	2	62	13	+49	23
3	Mura	14	8	1	5	53	41	+12	17
4	Nafta Lendava	14	7	1	6	35	21	+14	15
5	Aluminij	14	7	1	6	38	35	+3	15
6	Drava Ptuj	14	4	1	9	23	78	−55	9
7	Kovinar Štore	14	1	1	12	21	71	−50	3
8	Kovinar Maribor	14	1	1	12	12	55	−43	3

== West table ==
Pos	Team	Pld	W	D	L	GF	GA	GD	Pts
1	Korotan Kranj	14	7	5	2	53	17	+36	19
2	Izola	14	7	5	2	44	16	+28	19
3	Železničar Gorica	14	6	5	3	39	30	+9	17
4	Krim	14	7	2	5	31	27	+4	16
5	Postojna	14	7	1	6	26	38	−12	15
6	Gregorčič Jesenice	14	4	3	7	12	38	−26	11
7	Proletarec	14	3	3	8	22	47	−25	9
8	Sloga Ljubljana	14	2	2	10	19	40	−21	6

== Qualification for Yugoslav Inter-Republic League ==
16 August 1953

Železničar Maribor	1–3	Izola

Ob Tržaški Cesti Stadium, Maribor
23 August 1953

Izola	0–0	Železničar Maribor

Ob Morju Football Field, Izola
