= 1953–54 Slovenian Republic League =

Slovenian Republic League
- Season: 1953–54
- Champions: Železničar Maribor; Piran
- Relegated: ŽŠD Celje; Jesenice; Domžale
- Matches played: 162
- Goals scored: 717 (4.43 per match)

== East table ==
Pos	Team	Pld	W	D	L	GF	GA	GD	Pts
1	Železničar Maribor	18	13	1	4	77	18	+59	27
2	Mura	18	10	4	4	65	46	+19	24
3	Rudar Trbovlje	18	10	3	5	58	26	+32	23
4	Nafta Lendava	18	9	5	4	58	30	+28	23
5	Proletarec	18	11	0	7	39	30	+9	22
6	Rudar Velenje	18	7	3	8	40	50	−10	17
7	Aluminij	18	5	6	7	26	34	−8	16
8	Drava Ptuj	18	5	2	11	31	63	−32	12
9	Kovinar Štore	18	4	2	12	22	78	−56	10
10	ŽŠD Celje	18	3	0	15	23	64	−41	6

== West table ==
Pos	Team	Pld	W	D	L	GF	GA	GD	Pts
1	Piran	16	10	2	4	38	20	+18	22
2	Železničar Gorica	16	8	4	4	40	24	+16	20
3	Slovan	16	7	6	3	29	29	0	20
4	Aurora Koper	16	9	1	6	35	20	+15	19
5	Krim	16	8	3	5	44	26	+18	19
6	Branik Solkan	16	7	2	7	26	27	−1	16
7	Postojna	16	7	1	8	31	28	+3	15
8	Jesenice	16	3	0	13	21	43	−22	6
9	Domžale	16	2	2	12	14	53	−39	6

== Qualification for Yugoslav Inter-Republic League ==
1 August 1954

Železničar Maribor	6–0	Piran

Ob Tržaški Cesti Stadium, Maribor
8 August 1954

Piran	2–1	Železničar Maribor

Pod Obzidjem Stadium, Piran
