= 1995–96 Slovenian Second League =

Slovenian Second League
- Season: 1995–96
- Champions: Železničar Ljubljana
- Relegated: Mengeš; Radeče
- Goals scored: 602
- Top goalscorer: Marjan Dominko; Oskar Drobne; (19 goals each)

The 1995–96 Slovenian Second League season started on 13 August 1995 and ended on 9 June 1996. Each team played a total of 29 matches. Jadran Dekani and Kočevje withdrew before the start of the season. Their places were taken by Železničar Maribor and Črnuče.

== League standing ==
| Pos | Team | Pld | W | D | L | GF | GA | GD | Pts | Promotion or relegation |
|---|---|---|---|---|---|---|---|---|---|---|
| 1 | Železničar Ljubljana (C) | 29 | 20 | 7 | 2 | 62 | 20 | +42 | 67 | |
| 2 | Nafta Lendava | 29 | 18 | 5 | 6 | 51 | 19 | +32 | 59 | Qualification to promotion play-offs |
| 3 | Črnuče | 29 | 15 | 6 | 8 | 60 | 41 | +19 | 51 | |
| 4 | Šentjur | 29 | 13 | 5 | 11 | 45 | 36 | +9 | 44 | |
| 5 | Železničar Maribor | 29 | 13 | 5 | 11 | 51 | 47 | +4 | 44 | |
| 6 | Koper (P) | 29 | 11 | 8 | 10 | 33 | 30 | +3 | 41 | Promotion to Slovenian PrvaLiga |
| 7 | Piran | 29 | 12 | 5 | 12 | 35 | 34 | +1 | 41 | |
| 8 | Domžale | 29 | 10 | 9 | 10 | 32 | 34 | −2 | 39 | |
| 9 | Šmartno | 29 | 10 | 7 | 12 | 35 | 34 | +1 | 37 | |
| 10 | Zagorje | 29 | 11 | 3 | 15 | 30 | 54 | −24 | 36 | |
| 11 | Slavija Vevče | 29 | 9 | 6 | 14 | 43 | 40 | +3 | 33 | |
| 12 | Rudar Trbovlje | 29 | 9 | 6 | 14 | 24 | 39 | −15 | 33 | |
| 13 | Naklo | 29 | 7 | 10 | 12 | 33 | 38 | −5 | 31 | |
| 14 | Drava Ptuj | 29 | 8 | 7 | 14 | 32 | 53 | −21 | 31 | |
| 15 | Mengeš (R) | 29 | 7 | 9 | 13 | 24 | 42 | −18 | 30 | Relegation to Slovenian Third League |
| 16 | Radeče (R) | 15 | 2 | 2 | 11 | 12 | 41 | −29 | 8 | Withdrew from the competition |

(C) Champions; (P) Promoted; (R) Relegated

== See also ==
- 1995–96 Slovenian PrvaLiga
- 1995–96 Slovenian Third League
