= 1968–69 Slovenian Republic League =

Slovenian Republic League
- Season: 1968–69
- Champions: Železničar Maribor
- Relegated: Triglav Kranj; Koper; Hrastnik
- Matches played: 132
- Goals scored: 432 (3.27 per match)

== Final table ==
Pos	Team	Pld	W	D	L	GF	GA	GD	Pts
1	Železničar Maribor	22	13	5	4	62	31	+31	31
2	Nova Gorica	22	12	4	6	51	29	+22	28
3	Svoboda	22	12	4	6	47	29	+18	28
4	Rudar Trbovlje	22	12	4	6	40	24	+16	28
5	Slavija Vevče	22	12	3	7	37	34	+3	27
6	Nafta Lendava	22	8	9	5	33	35	−2	25
7	Ilirija	22	8	5	9	30	35	−5	21
8	Kladivar Celje	22	8	3	11	34	39	−5	19
9	Kovinar Maribor	22	6	7	9	28	37	−9	19
10	Triglav Kranj	22	6	4	12	30	42	−12	16
11	Koper	22	5	3	14	22	43	−21	13
12	Hrastnik	22	2	5	15	18	54	−36	9
