= 1972–73 Slovenian Republic League =

Slovenian Republic League
- Season: 1972–73
- Champions: Železničar Maribor
- Relegated: Triglav Kranj
- Matches played: 132
- Goals scored: 420 (3.18 per match)

== Final table ==
| Pos | Team | Pld | W | D | L | GF | GA | GD | Pts |
|---|---|---|---|---|---|---|---|---|---|
| 1 | Železničar Maribor | 22 | 14 | 4 | 4 | 64 | 15 | +49 | 32 |
| 2 | Ljubljana | 22 | 11 | 7 | 4 | 38 | 24 | +14 | 29 |
| 3 | Ilirija | 22 | 11 | 5 | 6 | 45 | 33 | +12 | 27 |
| 4 | Izola | 22 | 8 | 10 | 4 | 27 | 25 | +2 | 26 |
| 5 | Slavija Vevče | 22 | 7 | 9 | 6 | 33 | 33 | 0 | 23 |
| 6 | Drava Ptuj | 22 | 9 | 5 | 8 | 28 | 28 | 0 | 23 |
| 7 | Nafta Lendava | 22 | 7 | 8 | 7 | 37 | 28 | +9 | 22 |
| 8 | Kladivar Celje | 22 | 7 | 6 | 9 | 33 | 39 | −6 | 20 |
| 9 | Aluminij | 22 | 6 | 7 | 9 | 31 | 51 | −20 | 19 |
| 10 | Koper | 22 | 5 | 7 | 10 | 26 | 29 | −3 | 17 |
| 11 | Kovinar Maribor | 22 | 5 | 7 | 10 | 31 | 50 | −19 | 17 |
| 12 | Triglav Kranj | 22 | 2 | 5 | 15 | 27 | 55 | −28 | 9 |

== Qualification for Yugoslav Second League ==
14 July 1973

| Mercator Ljubljana | 3–2 | Železničar Maribor |

Svoboda Sports Park, Ljubljana
21 July 1973

| Železničar Maribor | 1–6 | Mercator Ljubljana |

Tabor Sports Park, Maribor
