= 1991–92 Slovenian PrvaLiga =

Slovenian PrvaLiga
- Season: 1991–92
- Champions: Olimpija (1st title)
- Relegated: Dekani; Medvode; Domžale; Rudar Trbovlje; Primorje
- Champions League: Olimpija
- Cup Winners' Cup: Maribor
- UEFA Cup: Izola
- Matches: 420
- Goals: 1,083 (2.58 per match)
- Top goalscorer: Zoran Ubavič (29 goals)
- Biggest home win: Olimpija 12–0 Dekani
- Biggest away win: Primorje 0–5 Slovan
- Highest scoring: Olimpija 12–0 Dekani
- Longest winning run: 8 games Olimpija
- Longest unbeaten run: 12 games Olimpija
- Longest winless run: 17 games Nafta
- Longest losing run: 7 games Železničar
- Highest attendance: 7,000; Olimpija 2–0 Maribor
- Lowest attendance: 50; Slovan 5–0 Beltinci
- Total attendance: 318,160
- Average attendance: 757

The 1991–92 Slovenian PrvaLiga was the first season of Slovenian top division football. The season started on 18 August 1991 and ended on 21 June 1992 with each team playing a total of 40 matches.

== Qualified clubs ==
After Slovenia's independence in June 1991, 16 clubs that were supposed to participate in the Slovenian Republic League were joined by five Slovenian clubs from the Yugoslav leagues.

Team	Venue	1990–91 result
Slovan	Kodeljevo	2nd in the Slovenian Republic League
Svoboda	Svoboda Sports Park	3rd in the Slovenian Republic League
Ljubljana	ŽŠD	4th in the Slovenian Republic League
Nafta Lendava	City Stadium	5th in the Slovenian Republic League
Kladivar Celje	Skalna Klet	6th in the Slovenian Republic League
Domžale	Sports Park	7th in the Slovenian Republic League
Naklo	Pod Štucljem	8th in the Slovenian Republic League
Steklar	Steklar Stadium	9th in the Slovenian Republic League
Gorica	Sports Park	10th in the Slovenian Republic League
Mura	Fazanerija	11th in the Slovenian Republic League
Rudar Trbovlje	Rudar Stadium	12th in the Slovenian Republic League
Jadran Dekani	Ivan Gregorič Stadium	13th in the Slovenian Republic League
Medvode	Ob Sori	14th in the Slovenian Republic League
Proletarec	Proletarec Stadium	1st in the Slovenian Zonal League West
Beltinka	Beltinci Sports Park	1st in the Slovenian Zonal League East
Primorje	Primorje Stadium	2nd in the Slovenian Zonal League West, play-off winners
Olimpija	Bežigrad	14th in the Yugoslav First League
Izola	City Stadium	7th in the Yugoslav Inter-Republic League West
Maribor	Ljudski vrt	8th in the Yugoslav Inter-Republic League West
Koper	Bonifika	12th in the Yugoslav Inter-Republic League West
Rudar Velenje	Ob Jezeru	1st in the Slovenian Republic League, qualified for Inter-Republic

=== Play-offs ===
16 June 1991

Dravinja	0–1	Primorje

Dobrava Stadium, Slovenske Konjice
23 June 1991

Primorje	2–2	Dravinja

Primorje Stadium, Ajdovščina

== League table ==
Pos	Team	Pld	W	D	L	GF	GA	GD	Pts	Qualification or relegation
1	Olimpija (C)	40	30	6	4	102	18	+84	66	Qualification to Champions League preliminary round
2	Maribor	40	25	9	6	76	30	+46	59	Qualification to Cup Winners' Cup qualifying round
3	Izola	40	22	12	6	62	26	+36	56	Qualification to UEFA Cup first round
4	Gorica	40	15	16	9	63	40	+23	46	
5	Ljubljana	40	17	12	11	59	41	+18	46	
6	Naklo	40	14	18	8	49	39	+10	46	
7	Mura	40	17	9	14	60	49	+11	43	
8	Koper	40	15	13	12	38	33	+5	43	
9	Celje	40	14	13	13	43	51	−8	41	
10	Slovan	40	14	12	14	51	40	+11	40	
11	Svoboda	40	14	12	14	51	55	−4	40	
12	Rudar Velenje	40	13	12	15	59	65	−6	38	
13	Beltinci	40	14	10	16	48	60	−12	38	
14	Zagorje	40	13	10	17	47	44	+3	36	
15	Nafta Lendava	40	13	10	17	52	63	−11	36	
16	Steklar	40	12	12	16	57	75	−18	36	
17	Primorje (R)	40	12	11	17	44	60	−16	35	Relegation to Slovenian Second League
18	Rudar Trbovlje (R)	40	12	9	19	47	60	−13	33	Relegation to Slovenian Second League
19	Domžale (R)	40	5	14	21	26	59	−33	24	Relegation to Slovenian Second League
20	Medvode (R)	40	9	5	26	26	84	−58	23	Relegation to Slovenian Second League
21	Jadran Dekani (R)	40	4	7	29	23	91	−68	15	Relegation to Slovenian Second League

Source: PrvaLiga (in Slovene)
(C) Champions; (R) Relegated

== Results ==
Home \ Away	BEL	CEL	DOM	GOR	IZO	JAD	KOP	LJU	MAR	MED	MUR	NAF	NAK	OLI	PRI	RTR	RUD	SLO	STE	SVO	ZAG
Beltinci		2–1	2–0	1–0	1–2	3–1	1–3	0–0	0–0	2–2	2–0	6–4	2–1	0–1	1–1	1–1	2–2	1–0	3–0	3–0	3–2
Celje	3–0		1–1	0–0	0–0	2–0	1–0	2–1	0–0	3–1	1–0	1–0	1–1	0–0	3–1	2–0	1–2	1–0	3–1	1–1	2–1
Domžale	0–0	0–0		2–2	0–2	2–0	0–1	0–1	0–1	2–0	0–0	2–0	0–0	0–1	0–3	1–1	1–1	1–0	2–2	0–0	3–2
Gorica	2–1	2–0	1–0		2–2	5–0	0–0	2–2	3–0	6–0	3–0	5–1	0–0	0–2	2–1	2–2	1–1	1–0	1–0	2–2	2–1
Izola	1–0	5–1	3–0	2–0		2–1	1–0	1–1	1–0	1–0	2–1	4–0	1–0	1–1	2–0	2–0	0–0	3–0	3–0	1–1	2–0
Jadran Dekani	3–1	2–3	1–1	1–1	1–3		1–0	0–2	1–3	1–0	0–1	0–1	2–3	0–4	0–0	0–1	0–0	3–2	0–1	0–1	0–0
Koper	1–2	4–1	1–1	1–2	1–1	1–0		1–0	0–1	4–0	2–1	1–1	0–1	1–1	1–0	1–0	2–0	0–1	2–1	1–1	2–1
Ljubljana	3–0	3–0	2–1	1–1	2–1	4–0	0–1		2–2	1–0	0–0	1–0	2–2	0–1	2–0	3–2	3–1	0–0	9–2	0–0	3–1
Maribor	1–0	3–0	3–1	1–1	2–1	5–1	5–0	4–0		0–0	2–0	4–0	4–1	2–1	6–2	2–0	5–2	2–0	1–0	3–1	0–0
Medvode	0–2	3–1	1–0	1–0	0–2	3–1	0–1	0–4	2–4		1–4	2–1	1–2	1–5	1–0	0–1	1–1	0–2	0–3	0–4	1–0
Mura	5–1	3–1	1–0	2–1	2–0	0–0	0–0	3–0	1–2	3–0		2–2	1–1	2–1	1–1	1–0	2–3	1–2	5–1	4–0	1–1
Nafta Lendava	1–1	2–2	1–1	1–0	1–0	3–0	1–1	3–0	0–1	1–0	2–3		1–1	1–0	2–1	3–2	2–0	1–1	0–1	4–2	1–0
Naklo	1–0	0–0	0–0	2–2	0–0	1–1	0–0	1–0	1–0	0–0	1–1	1–1		2–1	2–0	7–1	3–2	3–1	2–1	0–1	1–1
Olimpija	6–0	6–0	3–0	1–1	4–0	12–0	3–1	3–0	2–0	6–0	4–1	2–0	3–1		5–0	2–0	2–0	1–0	4–1	3–2	2–0
Primorje	1–1	0–0	2–1	1–1	1–1	1–0	1–0	1–0	0–0	1–2	4–0	3–2	1–1	0–2		2–1	2–0	0–5	1–1	2–3	2–1
Rudar Trbovlje	0–1	0–0	6–2	3–2	1–0	3–0	1–1	0–2	0–2	2–1	0–1	0–0	2–0	0–3	4–2		2–0	0–0	2–1	3–3	0–1
Rudar Velenje	1–1	3–1	5–0	4–3	1–5	3–1	1–1	1–1	1–0	1–1	0–2	3–2	1–3	0–1	3–0	1–0		2–0	6–2	1–1	2–0
Slovan	5–0	1–0	1–0	0–2	1–1	5–0	0–0	0–0	0–0	0–1	2–1	2–0	2–1	1–1	1–3	2–0	2–2		5–2	3–0	1–1
Steklar	2–1	0–4	3–1	0–0	0–0	2–0	0–0	1–1	0–0	4–0	3–1	1–4	1–1	0–0	2–1	5–2	4–2	1–1		0–1	4–2
Svoboda	1–0	0–0	2–0	1–0	0–3	4–1	1–0	1–2	3–5	4–0	2–1	3–0	0–1	0–1	0–2	1–3	1–0	1–1	2–2		0–0
Zagorje	2–0	1–0	3–0	0–2	0–0	2–0	0–1	2–1	2–0	4–0	1–2	3–2	1–0	0–1	0–0	0–0	4–0	3–1	2–2	2–0	

Source: PrvaLiga (in Slovene)
Legend: Blue = home team win; Yellow = draw; Red = away team win.

== Top goalscorers ==
Rank	Player	Club	Goals
1	(Slovenia) Zoran Ubavič	Olimpija	29
2	(Slovenia) Igor Poznič	Maribor	27
3	(Slovenia) Miloš Breznikar	Gorica	25
4	(Bosnia and Herzegovina) Nedeljko Topić	Olimpija	21
5	(Slovenia) Bojan Taneski	Naklo	20
6	(Slovenia) Matjaž Cvikl	Rudar Velenje	19
7	(Slovenia) Ante Šimundža	Maribor	17
8	(Croatia) Milan Kukić	Mura	16
8	(Slovenia) Igor Holešek	Rudar Trbovlje	16
8	(Slovenia) Dušan Kosič	Svoboda	16

== See also ==
- 1991–92 Slovenian Football Cup
- 1991–92 Slovenian Second League
