= 1958–59 Slovenian Republic League =

Slovenian Republic League
- Season: 1958–59
- Champions: Branik Maribor
- Relegated: Slovan; Jesenice
- Matches played: 132
- Goals scored: 549 (4.16 per match)

== Final table ==
Pos	Team	Pld	W	D	L	GF	GA	GD	Pts
1	Branik Maribor	22	17	2	3	74	26	+48	36
2	Rudar Trbovlje	22	14	3	5	58	31	+27	31
3	Kladivar Celje	22	12	4	6	58	41	+17	28
4	ŽŠD Maribor	22	11	5	6	48	33	+15	27
5	Ljubljana	22	11	4	7	44	36	+8	26
6	Triglav Kranj	22	9	4	9	43	43	0	22
7	Mura	22	9	3	10	66	58	+8	21
8	Krim	22	7	5	10	40	42	−2	19
9	Izola	22	5	6	11	28	45	−17	16
10	Grafičar Ljubljana	22	5	6	11	34	57	−23	16
11	Slovan	22	4	7	11	26	50	−24	15
12	Jesenice	22	3	1	18	30	86	−56	7
