= 1984–85 Slovenian Republic League =

Slovenian Republic League
- Season: 1984–85
- Champions: Koper
- Relegated: Izola; Brežice; Šmartno
- Matches played: 182
- Goals scored: 525 (2.88 per match)

== Final table ==
Pos	Team	Pld	W	D	L	GF	GA	GD	Pts
1	Koper	26	17	8	1	43	18	+25	42
2	Rudar Trbovlje	26	18	5	3	51	17	+34	41
3	Slovan	26	14	8	4	55	22	+33	36
4	Vozila	26	12	3	11	43	38	+5	27
5	Kovinar Maribor	26	10	7	9	27	22	+5	27
6	Triglav Kranj	26	11	4	11	39	42	−3	26
7	Železničar Maribor	26	8	7	11	25	26	−1	23
8	Rudar Velenje	26	8	7	11	38	48	−10	23
9	Kladivar Celje	26	8	7	11	37	47	−10	23
10	Mura	26	7	8	11	43	45	−2	22
11	Ilirija	26	6	8	12	31	44	−13	20
12	Izola	26	7	5	14	37	52	−15	19
13	Brežice	26	8	3	15	22	59	−37	19
14	Šmartno	26	5	6	15	34	51	−17	16
