= 1983–84 Slovenian Republic League =

Slovenian Republic League
- Season: 1983–84
- Champions: Maribor
- Relegated: Stol Kamnik; Primorje
- Matches played: 182
- Goals scored: 528 (2.9 per match)

== Final table ==
Pos	Team	Pld	W	D	L	GF	GA	GD	Pts
1	Maribor	26	22	1	3	74	11	+63	45
2	Rudar Velenje	26	15	6	5	51	30	+21	36
3	Rudar Trbovlje	26	13	6	7	39	25	+14	32
4	Koper	26	13	4	9	38	26	+12	30
5	Kovinar Maribor	26	10	5	11	35	35	0	25
6	Železničar Maribor	26	10	5	11	30	31	−1	25
7	Mura	26	9	7	10	32	39	−7	25
8	Triglav Kranj	26	9	6	11	33	39	−6	24
9	Vozila	26	7	9	10	28	35	−7	23
10	Kladivar Celje	26	8	7	11	32	46	−14	23
11	Izola	26	9	5	12	26	44	−18	23
12	Šmartno	26	7	8	11	38	45	−7	22
13	Stol Kamnik	26	6	8	12	44	51	−7	20
14	Primorje	26	3	5	18	28	74	−46	11
