= 1991–92 Slovenian Second League =

Slovenian Second League
- Season: 1991–92
- Champions: Železničar Maribor (East); Krka (West)
- Relegated: Kovinar Maribor; Partizan; Pohorje; Žalec; Bistrica; Rače; Pekre; Središče ob Dravi; Svoboda Kisovec; Piran; Brda; Bilje; Branik Šmarje; Vodice Šempas; Alpina Žiri; Jesenice; Veržej
- Matches: 364
- Goals: 968 (2.66 per match)

The 1991–92 Slovenian Second League season started on 25 August 1991 and ended on 14 June 1992. League was divided into the East and West groups. Each team played a total of 26 matches.

== East standing ==
Pos	Team	Pld	W	D	L	GF	GA	GD	Pts	Promotion or relegation
1	Železničar Maribor (C, P)	26	14	8	4	38	19	+19	36	Promotion to Slovenian PrvaLiga
2	Dravograd	26	13	6	7	40	31	+9	32	
3	Turnišče	26	12	7	7	50	37	+13	31	
4	Korotan Prevalje	26	12	5	9	32	25	+7	29	
5	Dravinja	26	11	7	8	43	24	+19	29	
6	Veržej (R)	26	10	9	7	36	29	+7	29	Qualification to relegation play-offs
7	Kovinar Maribor (R)	26	10	8	8	33	33	0	28	Relegation to Slovenian Third League
8	Partizan (R)	26	9	8	9	39	33	+6	26	Relegation to Slovenian Third League
9	Pohorje (R)	26	10	6	10	30	37	−7	26	Relegation to Slovenian Third League
10	Žalec (R)	26	9	7	10	29	33	−4	25	Relegation to Slovenian Third League
11	Bistrica (R)	26	9	5	12	34	40	−6	23	Relegation to Slovenian Third League
12	Rače (R)	26	7	7	12	32	41	−9	21	Relegation to Slovenian Third League
13	Pekre (R)	26	7	7	12	28	33	−5	21	Relegation to MNZ leagues
14	Središče ob Dravi (R)	26	3	2	21	21	70	−49	8	Relegation to MNZ leagues

(C) Champions; (P) Promoted; (R) Relegated

== West standing ==
Pos	Team	Pld	W	D	L	GF	GA	GD	Pts	Promotion or relegation
1	Krka (C, P)	26	18	5	3	50	14	+36	41	Promotion to Slovenian PrvaLiga
2	Triglav Kranj	26	17	4	5	53	21	+32	38	
3	Ilirija	26	15	4	7	64	21	+43	34	
4	Slavija Vevče	26	13	8	5	36	18	+18	34	
5	Kočevje	26	15	3	8	44	25	+19	33	
6	Tabor Sežana (O)	26	15	3	8	50	18	+32	33	Qualification to relegation play-offs
7	Svoboda Kisovec (R)	26	9	8	9	32	26	+6	26	Relegation to Slovenian Third League
8	Piran (R)	26	11	4	11	35	36	−1	26	Relegation to Slovenian Third League
9	Brda (R)	26	6	10	10	27	41	−14	22	Relegation to Slovenian Third League
10	Bilje (R)	26	7	4	15	22	46	−24	18	Relegation to Slovenian Third League
11	Branik Šmarje (R)	26	6	6	14	28	62	−34	18	Relegation to Slovenian Third League
12	Vodice Šempas (R)	26	3	9	14	11	40	−29	15	Relegation to Slovenian Third League
13	Alpina Žiri (R)	26	4	5	17	14	54	−40	13	Relegation to MNZ leagues
14	Jesenice (R)	26	3	7	16	17	61	−44	13	Relegation to MNZ leagues

(C) Champions; (O) Play-off winners; (P) Promoted; (R) Relegated

== Relegation play-offs ==
21 June 1992

Veržej	1–1	Tabor Sežana

Remiza Stadium, Veržej
25 June 1992

Tabor Sežana	2–1	Veržej

City Stadium, Sežana

Tabor Sežana won 3–2 on aggregate.

== See also ==
- 1991–92 Slovenian PrvaLiga
