= 1995–96 Slovenian Third League =

Slovenian Third League
- Season: 1995–96
- Champions: Dravograd (East); Renče (West)
- Relegated: Veržej; Bistrica; Arne Tabor 69; Visoko
- Matches: 364
- Goals: 1,034 (2.84 per match)

The 1995–96 Slovenian Third League was the fourth season of the Slovenian Third League, the third highest level in the Slovenian football system.

- Slovan merged with Slavija Vevče after the season.
- Jadran Hrpelje-Kozina defeated Pohorje in a promotion play-offs (2–1, 3–2).

== League standings ==
=== East ===
Pos	Team	Pld	W	D	L	GF	GA	GD	Pts	Promotion or relegation
1	Dravograd (C, P)	26	18	3	5	55	24	+31	57	Promotion to Slovenian Second League
2	Pohorje	26	18	2	6	69	31	+38	56	
3	Bakovci	26	17	3	6	45	22	+23	54	
4	Aluminij	26	10	7	9	41	36	+5	37	
5	Turnišče	26	11	4	11	38	49	−11	37	
6	Kovinar Maribor	26	9	8	9	36	32	+4	35	
7	Steklar	26	10	5	11	31	31	0	35	
8	Zreče	26	10	4	12	18	32	−14	34	
9	Odranci	26	10	3	13	35	43	−8	33	
10	Dravinja	26	9	6	11	33	41	−8	33	
11	Kungota	26	8	6	12	32	40	−8	30	
12	Paloma	26	7	5	14	26	46	−20	26	
13	Veržej (R)	26	7	4	15	31	40	−9	25	Relegation to Slovenian Regional Leagues
14	Bistrica (R)	26	6	4	16	38	61	−23	22	Relegation to Slovenian Regional Leagues

(C) Champions; (P) Promoted; (R) Relegated

=== West ===
Pos	Team	Pld	W	D	L	GF	GA	GD	Pts	Promotion or relegation
1	Renče (C, P)	26	16	9	1	48	14	+34	57	Promotion to Slovenian Second League
2	Jadran Hrpelje-Kozina (P)	26	14	11	1	38	16	+22	53	Promotion to Slovenian Second League
3	Triglav Kranj	26	12	6	8	46	32	+14	42	
4	Kolpa	26	12	5	9	51	36	+15	41	
5	Elan Novo Mesto	26	11	6	9	34	34	0	39	
6	Bilje	26	10	7	9	45	33	+12	37	
7	Slovan	26	9	9	8	35	29	+6	36	
8	Tabor Sežana	26	8	9	9	43	40	+3	33	
9	Brda	26	8	7	11	22	48	−26	31	
10	Ilirska Bistrica	26	7	9	10	36	38	−2	30	
11	Litija	26	8	5	13	25	35	−10	29	
12	Branik Šmarje	26	7	5	14	35	45	−10	26	
13	Arne Tabor 69	26	6	5	15	29	50	−21	23	Relegation to Slovenian Regional Leagues
14	Visoko (R)	26	3	9	14	19	56	−37	18	Relegation to Slovenian Regional Leagues

(C) Champions; (P) Promoted; (R) Relegated

== See also ==
- 1995–96 Slovenian Second League
