= 1937–38 Ljubljana Subassociation League =

Ljubljana Subassociation League
- Season: 1937–38
- Champions: Čakovec

The 1937–38 Ljubljana Subassociation League was the 19th season of the Ljubljana Subassociation League. Čakovec won the league for the first time.

== Ljubljana subdivision ==
Pos	Team	Pld	W	D	L	GF	GA	GD	Pts
1	Hermes	14	8	3	3	36	19	+17	19
2	Kranj	14	8	2	4	38	15	+23	18
3	Reka	14	8	2	4	30	20	+10	18
4	Jadran	14	8	2	4	28	28	0	18
5	Svoboda	14	6	3	5	35	26	+9	15
6	Bratstvo	14	6	0	8	27	30	−3	12
7	Mars	14	2	2	10	19	47	−28	6
8	Slovan	14	2	2	10	17	45	−28	6

== Maribor subdivision ==
Pos	Team	Pld	W	D	L	GF	GA	GD	Pts
1	Čakovec	10	6	2	2	35	15	+20	14
2	Železničar Maribor	10	6	1	3	31	23	+8	13
3	I. SSK Maribor	10	6	0	4	35	21	+14	12
4	Mura	10	5	1	4	28	21	+7	11
5	Rapid	10	5	0	5	20	25	−5	10
6	Građanski	10	0	0	10	4	48	−44	0

== Final ==
Pos	Team	Pld	W	D	L	GF	GA	GD	Pts
1	Čakovec	10	7	2	1	24	9	+15	16
2	Železničar Maribor	10	5	3	2	30	15	+15	13
3	I. SSK Maribor	10	5	2	3	22	19	+3	12
4	Hermes	10	2	4	4	23	28	−5	8
5	Kranj	10	2	3	5	49	29	+20	7
6	Celje	10	1	2	7	40	28	+12	4
