= 1989–90 Slovenian Republic League =

Slovenian Republic League
- Season: 1989–90
- Champions: Izola
- Relegated: Elkroj Mozirje; Stol Kamnik; Pohorje
- Matches: 182
- Goals: 413 (2.27 per match)

== Final table ==
Pos	Team	Pld	W	D	L	GF	GA	GD	Pts
1	Izola	26	16	6	4	43	13	+30	38
2	Rudar Velenje	26	14	6	6	48	26	+22	34
3	Domžale	26	13	4	9	34	29	+5	30
4	Slovan	26	9	11	6	36	23	+13	29
5	Medvode	26	8	10	8	25	33	−8	26
6	Steklar	26	9	7	10	38	37	+1	25
7	Rudar Trbovlje	26	9	7	10	27	35	−8	25
8	Elan Novo Mesto	26	7	11	8	19	28	−9	25
9	Partizan Žalec	26	8	8	10	28	34	−6	24
10	Mura	26	8	8	10	28	29	−1	24
11	Vozila	26	8	8	10	24	31	−7	24
12	Elkroj Mozirje	26	8	7	11	25	26	−1	23 (Note: Mozirje withdrew from the competition.)
13	Stol Kamnik	26	5	12	9	28	32	−4	22
14	Pohorje	26	0	12	14	10	38	−28	12
