= 1959–60 Slovenian Republic League =

Slovenian Republic League
- Season: 1959–60
- Champions: Branik Maribor
- Relegated: Grafičar Ljubljana; Izola
- Matches played: 132
- Goals scored: 562 (4.26 per match)

== Final table ==
Pos	Team	Pld	W	D	L	GF	GA	GD	Pts
1	Branik Maribor	22	18	1	3	88	20	+68	37
2	Kladivar Celje	22	15	2	5	62	45	+17	32
3	ŽŠD Maribor	22	12	4	6	39	32	+7	28
4	Rudar Trbovlje	22	11	2	9	61	31	+30	24
5	Triglav Kranj	22	11	2	9	52	43	+9	24
6	Mura	22	11	2	9	56	55	+1	24
7	Ljubljana	22	11	1	10	52	44	+8	23
8	Ilirija	22	9	2	11	35	43	−8	20
9	Krim	22	6	6	10	34	51	−17	18
10	Nova Gorica	22	5	3	14	41	70	−29	13
11	Grafičar Ljubljana	22	4	5	13	23	59	−36	13
12	Izola	22	0	8	14	19	68	−49	8
