= 1992–93 Slovenian PrvaLiga =

Slovenian PrvaLiga
- Season: 1992–93
- Champions: Olimpija (2nd title)
- Relegated: Nafta; Železničar; Steklar; Zagorje
- Champions League: Olimpija
- Cup Winners' Cup: Celje
- UEFA Cup: Maribor
- Matches played: 306
- Goals scored: 791 (2.58 per match)
- Top goalscorer: Sašo Udovič (25 goals)
- Biggest home win: Olimpija 10–1 Železničar
- Biggest away win: Nafta 0–4 Izola; Nafta 0–4 Naklo
- Highest scoring: Olimpija 10–1 Železničar
- Longest winning run: 8 games Olimpija
- Longest unbeaten run: 12 games Krka; Olimpija
- Longest winless run: 17 games Nafta
- Longest losing run: 7 games Železničar
- Highest attendance: 7,000; Maribor 1–0 Olimpija
- Lowest attendance: 50; Železničar 2–4 Krka
- Total attendance: 291,250
- Average attendance: 951

The 1992–93 Slovenian PrvaLiga was the second season of Slovenian top division football. The season started on 15 August 1992 and ended on 9 June 1993 with each team playing a total of 34 matches.

== League table ==
Pos	Team	Pld	W	D	L	GF	GA	GD	Pts	Qualification or relegation
1	Olimpija (C)	34	22	8	4	94	20	+74	52	Qualification to Champions League preliminary round
2	Maribor	34	18	12	4	50	20	+30	48	Qualification to UEFA Cup first round
3	Mura	34	19	8	7	50	28	+22	46	
4	Ljubljana	34	16	8	10	44	34	+10	40	
5	Naklo	34	15	10	9	55	47	+8	40	
6	Svoboda	34	14	10	10	38	33	+5	38	
7	Krka	34	13	12	9	35	30	+5	38	
8	Koper	34	11	13	10	41	45	−4	35	
9	Rudar Velenje	34	13	7	14	45	52	−7	33	
10	Celje	34	12	8	14	37	47	−10	32	Qualification to Cup Winners' Cup qualifying round
11	Slovan	34	9	13	12	45	43	+2	31	
12	Gorica	34	11	9	14	39	46	−7	31	
13	Izola	34	10	10	14	45	46	−1	30	
14	Beltinci	34	12	5	17	51	62	−11	29	
15	Zagorje (R)	34	10	8	16	29	40	−11	28	Relegation to Slovenian Second League
16	Steklar (R)	34	4	14	16	33	72	−39	22	Relegation to Slovenian Second League
17	Železničar Maribor (R)	34	6	8	20	30	62	−32	20	Relegation to Slovenian Second League
18	Nafta Lendava (R)	34	6	7	21	30	64	−34	19	Relegation to Slovenian Second League

Source: PrvaLiga (in Slovene)
(C) Champions; (R) Relegated

== Results ==
Home \ Away	BEL	CEL	GOR	IZO	KOP	KRK	LJU	MAR	MUR	NAF	NAK	OLI	RUD	SLO	STE	SVO	ZAG	ŽLM
Beltinci		2–2	3–1	5–2	0–1	0–2	1–5	2–2	0–1	2–0	2–1	1–1	2–0	6–3	1–3	1–4	1–2	1–0
Celje	2–1		3–1	0–0	3–0	0–1	3–1	1–1	0–1	1–0	2–2	1–2	0–0	1–0	4–2	2–1	3–1	2–1
Gorica	1–0	0–0		1–0	0–0	0–1	1–0	0–0	0–1	1–2	5–2	2–2	3–1	2–1	5–0	0–0	1–0	5–0
Izola	3–3	2–0	1–1		1–3	1–0	1–1	0–1	2–1	2–0	3–0	1–2	0–1	2–0	3–3	2–2	2–0	4–1
Koper	1–0	1–3	4–1	0–0		1–0	1–1	2–1	1–3	2–1	0–0	1–1	5–1	1–1	4–1	0–0	1–0	1–0
Krka	2–3	2–1	2–2	2–1	0–0		0–0	0–0	1–1	1–1	1–1	1–0	4–1	1–0	3–0	0–0	1–0	2–0
Ljubljana	0–2	1–0	3–0	1–1	1–1	1–0		0–3	1–0	5–0	1–2	1–0	2–0	1–0	3–0	2–1	1–0	2–1
Maribor	1–1	4–0	3–0	2–0	3–0	1–0	3–0		2–0	1–1	1–0	1–0	2–0	2–0	1–1	1–1	3–1	2–1
Mura	0–2	3–0	3–0	0–0	2–0	2–0	0–0	2–0		4–1	0–1	1–1	3–0	1–0	4–0	1–1	2–0	1–0
Nafta Lendava	2–0	3–1	1–2	0–4	0–0	0–0	2–3	0–1	2–4		0–4	1–2	0–3	2–2	0–0	2–0	3–0	3–0
Naklo	3–1	4–0	2–0	3–1	2–2	0–0	2–1	0–3	1–1	3–1		1–0	3–1	0–0	3–0	2–1	0–2	2–0
Olimpija	6–0	3–0	2–0	2–0	1–0	6–1	5–1	3–0	5–0	4–0	6–1		5–0	1–1	8–0	0–0	2–1	10–1
Rudar Velenje	2–1	2–0	3–1	1–1	6–3	2–0	1–0	0–0	0–1	2–0	4–4	0–3		0–0	4–1	4–0	2–1	3–0
Slovan	6–2	0–0	1–1	0–1	6–2	2–1	1–1	1–1	5–1	1–0	3–2	1–4	0–0		1–1	2–0	2–0	2–1
Steklar	1–3	1–1	0–0	3–2	2–2	1–2	0–1	2–4	1–1	2–0	0–0	1–1	1–1	3–2		0–1	0–0	1–1
Svoboda	1–0	0–1	3–0	2–0	0–0	0–0	0–2	1–0	0–2	3–0	3–1	0–4	2–0	1–0	3–1		2–1	2–0
Zagorje	0–2	1–0	1–0	2–1	2–0	0–0	1–0	0–0	1–1	3–1	1–2	0–2	1–0	1–1	0–0	2–2		3–1
Železničar Maribor	1–0	3–0	1–2	3–1	2–1	2–4	1–1	0–0	0–2	1–1	1–1	0–0	3–0	0–0	3–1	0–1	1–1	

Source: PrvaLiga (in Slovene)
Legend: Blue = home team win; Yellow = draw; Red = away team win.

== Top goalscorers ==
Rank	Player	Club	Goals
1	(Slovenia) Sašo Udovič	Slovan	25
2	(Slovenia) Zoran Ubavič	Olimpija	24
3	(Slovenia) Samir Zulič	Olimpija	23
4	(Slovenia) Štefan Škaper	Beltinci	22
5	(Slovenia) Robert Marušič	Naklo	17
6	(Slovenia) Florijan Debenjak	Gorica	15
6	(Bosnia and Herzegovina) Nedeljko Topić	Olimpija	15
6	(Slovenia) Vlado Miloševič	Ljubljana/Beltinci	15
9	(Slovenia) Matjaž Cvikl	Rudar Velenje	13
10	(Slovenia) Ante Šimundža	Maribor	12

== See also ==
- 1992–93 Slovenian Football Cup
- 1992–93 Slovenian Second League
