= 1998–99 Slovenian Second League =

Slovenian Second League
- Season: 1998–99
- Champions: Dravograd
- Relegated: Renče; Factor; Slovan Slavija; Rudar Trbovlje
- Matches played: 240
- Goals scored: 708 (2.95 per match)
- Top goalscorer: Alen Mujanovič (18 goals)

The 1998–99 Slovenian Second League season started on 15 August 1998 and ended on 13 June 1999. Each team played a total of 30 matches.

== League standing ==
Pos	Team	Pld	W	D	L	GF	GA	GD	Pts	Promotion or relegation
1	Dravograd (C, P)	30	18	7	5	69	31	+38	61	Promotion to Slovenian PrvaLiga
2	Pohorje (P)	30	16	6	8	56	35	+21	54	Promotion to Slovenian PrvaLiga
3	Železničar Maribor	30	15	9	6	58	30	+28	54	
4	Šmartno	30	15	8	7	49	28	+21	53	
5	Tabor Sežana	30	15	7	8	59	35	+24	52	
6	Aluminij	30	14	9	7	57	42	+15	51	
7	Drava Ptuj	30	13	9	8	48	36	+12	48	
8	Zagorje	30	12	7	11	45	43	+2	43	
9	Šentjur	30	11	7	12	38	44	−6	40	
10	Krka	30	11	6	13	45	61	−16	39	
11	Nafta Lendava	30	10	6	14	35	47	−12	36	
12	Jadran Hrpelje-Kozina	30	10	5	15	36	42	−6	35	
13	Renče (R)	30	9	7	14	37	53	−16	34	Relegation to Slovenian Third League
14	Factor (R)	30	6	11	13	30	44	−14	29	Relegation to Slovenian Third League
15	Slovan Slavija (R)	30	4	6	20	29	75	−46	18	Relegation to Slovenian Third League
16	Rudar Trbovlje (R)	30	3	6	21	17	62	−45	15	Relegation to Slovenian Third League

(C) Champions; (P) Promoted; (R) Relegated

== See also ==
- 1998–99 Slovenian PrvaLiga
- 1998–99 Slovenian Third League
