= 1965–66 Slovenian Republic League =

Slovenian Republic League
- Season: 1965–66
- Champions: Aluminij
- Relegated: Rudar Velenje; Kladivar Celje; Koper
- Matches played: 132
- Goals scored: 478 (3.62 per match)

== Final table ==
Pos	Team	Pld	W	D	L	GF	GA	GD	Pts
1	Aluminij	22	15	4	3	64	23	+41	34
2	Triglav Kranj	22	13	4	5	49	30	+19	30
3	ŽŠD Celje	22	13	1	8	42	29	+13	27
4	Ljubljana	22	10	6	6	36	31	+5	26
5	Rudar Trbovlje	22	10	3	9	42	41	+1	23
6	Železničar Maribor	22	11	1	10	35	47	−12	23
7	Nova Gorica	22	8	4	10	32	40	−8	20
8	Mura	22	6	6	10	34	46	−12	18
9	Branik Maribor	22	7	4	11	39	56	−17	18
10	Rudar Velenje	22	7	3	12	36	53	−17	17
11	Kladivar Celje	22	6	3	13	35	51	−16	15
12	Koper	22	3	6	13	34	61	−27	12
