= 1940–41 Ljubljana Subassociation League =

Ljubljana Subassociation League
- Season: 1940–41
- Champions: SK Ljubljana (2nd title)

The 1940–41 Ljubljana Subassociation League was the 22nd and final season of the Ljubljana Subassociation League. SK Ljubljana won the league for the second time. In this season, all Slovenian top tier clubs participated, as the previously played 1939–40 Croatian-Slovenian League, which corresponded to the Yugoslav first tier along with the 1939–40 Serbian League, was disbanded and a separate Croatian and Slovenian leagues were formed.

== Final table ==
Pos	Team	Pld	W	D	L	GF	GA	GD	Pts
1	SK Ljubljana	14	10	2	2	55	21	+34	22
2	Železničar Maribor	14	8	4	2	30	14	+16	20
3	Amater	14	8	1	5	37	30	+7	17
4	Mars	14	6	2	6	37	27	+10	14
5	Bratstvo	14	6	2	6	30	38	−8	14
6	Kranj	14	6	1	7	25	30	−5	13
7	I. SSK Maribor	14	4	2	8	38	39	−1	10
8	Olimp Celje	14	1	0	13	11	64	−53	2
