= 1996–97 Slovenian Third League =

Slovenian Third League
- Season: 1996–97
- Champions: Aluminij (East); Krka (West)
- Relegated: Brunšvik; Steklar; Mengeš; Korte; Lesce; Ilirija
- Matches: 364
- Goals: 1,097 (3.01 per match)

The 1996–97 Slovenian Third League was the fifth season of the Slovenian Third League, the third highest level in the Slovenian football system.

- Triglav Kranj merged with Naklo during the season.

== League standings ==
=== East ===
| Pos | Team | Pld | W | D | L | GF | GA | GD | Pts | Promotion or relegation |
|---|---|---|---|---|---|---|---|---|---|---|
| 1 | Aluminij (C, P) | 26 | 19 | 5 | 2 | 67 | 18 | +49 | 62 | Promotion to Slovenian Second League |
| 2 | Pohorje | 26 | 17 | 4 | 5 | 63 | 28 | +35 | 55 | |
| 3 | Bakovci | 26 | 15 | 8 | 3 | 64 | 21 | +43 | 53 | |
| 4 | Črenšovci | 26 | 17 | 0 | 9 | 43 | 26 | +17 | 51 | |
| 5 | Paloma | 26 | 11 | 4 | 11 | 32 | 31 | +1 | 37 | |
| 6 | Kovinar Maribor | 26 | 10 | 4 | 12 | 33 | 45 | −12 | 34 | |
| 7 | Zreče | 26 | 9 | 6 | 11 | 35 | 31 | +4 | 33 | |
| 8 | Goričanka | 26 | 8 | 8 | 10 | 38 | 32 | +6 | 32 | |
| 9 | Turnišče | 26 | 8 | 8 | 10 | 31 | 47 | −16 | 32 | |
| 10 | Dravinja | 26 | 8 | 7 | 11 | 41 | 48 | −7 | 31 | |
| 11 | Odranci | 26 | 8 | 3 | 15 | 33 | 42 | −9 | 27 | |
| 12 | Kungota | 26 | 6 | 8 | 12 | 27 | 54 | −27 | 26 | |
| 13 | Brunšvik (R) | 26 | 5 | 5 | 16 | 28 | 65 | −37 | 20 | Relegation to Slovenian Regional Leagues |
| 14 | Steklar (R) | 26 | 4 | 4 | 18 | 22 | 67 | −45 | 16 | Relegation to Slovenian Regional Leagues |

(C) Champions; (P) Promoted; (R) Relegated

=== West ===
| Pos | Team | Pld | W | D | L | GF | GA | GD | Pts | Promotion or relegation |
|---|---|---|---|---|---|---|---|---|---|---|
| 1 | Krka (C, P) | 26 | 21 | 3 | 2 | 66 | 14 | +52 | 66 | Promotion to Slovenian Second League |
| 2 | Tabor Sežana | 26 | 20 | 2 | 4 | 80 | 22 | +58 | 62 | |
| 3 | Branik Šmarje | 26 | 17 | 6 | 3 | 46 | 17 | +29 | 57 | |
| 4 | Kolpa | 26 | 11 | 5 | 10 | 45 | 40 | +5 | 38 | |
| 5 | Brda | 26 | 10 | 6 | 10 | 38 | 48 | −10 | 36 | |
| 6 | Idrija | 26 | 9 | 8 | 9 | 40 | 34 | +6 | 35 | |
| 7 | Bilje | 26 | 10 | 5 | 11 | 32 | 27 | +5 | 35 | |
| 8 | Naklo Triglav (Note: Triglav started the season in the Slovenian Third League. During the winter break, Triglav merged with Naklo, who was a member of the Slovenian Second League. In the second half of the season, a team named Triglav Naklo competed in the Slovenian Second League, while a team named Naklo Triglav competed in the Slovenian Third League.) | 26 | 10 | 4 | 12 | 37 | 40 | −3 | 34 | |
| 9 | Litija | 26 | 8 | 8 | 10 | 29 | 34 | −5 | 32 | |
| 10 | Ilirska Bistrica | 26 | 8 | 8 | 10 | 27 | 32 | −5 | 32 | |
| 11 | Mengeš (R) | 26 | 8 | 6 | 12 | 33 | 50 | −17 | 30 | Relegation to Slovenian Regional Leagues |
| 12 | Korte (R) | 26 | 7 | 5 | 14 | 29 | 37 | −8 | 26 | Relegation to Slovenian Regional Leagues |
| 13 | Lesce (R) | 26 | 3 | 5 | 18 | 24 | 73 | −49 | 14 | Relegation to Slovenian Regional Leagues |
| 14 | Ilirija (R) | 26 | 2 | 5 | 19 | 14 | 72 | −58 | 11 | Relegation to Slovenian Regional Leagues |

(C) Champions; (P) Promoted; (R) Relegated

== See also ==
- 1996–97 Slovenian Second League
