= 1996–97 Slovenian Second League =

Slovenian Second League
- Season: 1996–97
- Champions: Vevče
- Relegated: Piran; Ljubljana
- Goals scored: 565
- Top goalscorer: Anton Usnik (15 goals)

The 1996–97 Slovenian Second League season started on 17 August 1996 and ended on 1 June 1997. Each team played a total of 29 matches. NK Naklo merged with Triglav Kranj during the season.

== League standing ==
Pos	Team	Pld	W	D	L	GF	GA	GD	Pts	Promotion or relegation
1	Vevče (C, P)	29	17	9	3	57	19	+38	60	Promotion to Slovenian PrvaLiga
2	Drava Ptuj	29	16	8	5	49	19	+30	56	Qualification to promotion play-offs
3	Dravograd	29	14	8	7	41	28	+13	50	
4	Nafta Lendava	29	12	12	5	36	28	+8	48	
5	Rudar Trbovlje	29	12	9	8	38	29	+9	45	
6	Šentjur	29	11	9	9	37	38	−1	42	
7	Domžale	29	11	6	12	40	30	+10	39	
8	Zagorje	29	9	11	9	37	37	0	38	
9	Železničar Maribor	29	10	7	12	37	33	+4	37	
10	Goriške Opekarne	29	10	7	12	32	34	−2	37	
11	Triglav Naklo (Note: Triglav started the season in the Slovenian Third League. During the winter break, Triglav merged with Naklo, who was a member of the Slovenian Second League. In the second half of the season, a team named Triglav Naklo competed in the Slovenian Second League, while a team named Naklo Triglav competed in the Slovenian Third League.)	29	8	12	9	37	31	+6	36	
12	Šmartno	29	10	5	14	42	43	−1	35	
13	Jadran Hrpelje-Kozina	29	9	6	14	27	48	−21	33	
14	Črnuče	29	7	7	15	26	48	−22	28	
15	Piran (R)	29	6	3	20	19	74	−55	21	Relegation to Slovenian Third League
16	Ljubljana (R)	15	1	5	9	10	26	−16	8	Withdrew from the competition

(C) Champions; (P) Promoted; (R) Relegated

== See also ==
- 1996–97 Slovenian PrvaLiga
- 1996–97 Slovenian Third League
