= 1996–97 Slovenian PrvaLiga =

Annual soccer tournament

Slovenian PrvaLiga
- Season: 1996–97
- Champions: Maribor (1st title)
- Relegated: Koper
- Champions League: Maribor
- UEFA Cup: Gorica
- Cup Winners' Cup: Primorje
- Intertoto Cup: Celje
- Matches played: 180
- Goals scored: 472 (2.62 per match)
- Top goalscorer: Faik Kamberović (21 goals)
- Biggest home win: Primorje 7–0 Beltinci
- Biggest away win: Rudar 1–6 Maribor
- Highest scoring: Celje 6–2 Koper; Olimpija 6–2 Mura
- Longest winning run: 7 games Primorje
- Longest unbeaten run: 13 games Primorje
- Longest winless run: 13 games Beltinci
- Longest losing run: 4 games Beltinci; Koper; Olimpija
- Highest attendance: 14,000; Maribor 5–1 Beltinci
- Lowest attendance: 150; Olimpija 2–0 Koper
- Total attendance: 304,900
- Average attendance: 1,693

The 1996–97 Slovenian PrvaLiga season started on 4 August 1996 and ended on 1 June 1997. Each team played a total of 36 matches.

== League table ==
Pos	Team	Pld	W	D	L	GF	GA	GD	Pts	Qualification or relegation
1	Maribor (C)	36	21	8	7	71	34	+37	71	Qualification to Champions League first qualifying round
2	Primorje	36	19	9	8	64	25	+39	66	Qualification to Cup Winners' Cup qualifying round
3	Gorica	36	18	11	7	52	33	+19	65	Qualification to UEFA Cup first qualifying round
4	Celje	36	12	11	13	55	61	−6	47	Qualification to Intertoto Cup group stage
5	Olimpija	36	11	12	13	54	52	+2	45	
6	Korotan Prevalje	36	12	9	15	32	39	−7	45	
7	Mura	36	9	16	11	36	45	−9	43	
8	Rudar Velenje	36	10	12	14	43	53	−10	42	
9	Beltinci (O)	36	7	11	18	37	69	−32	32	Qualification to relegation play-offs
10	Koper (R)	36	8	7	21	28	61	−33	31	Relegation to Slovenian Second League

Source: PrvaLiga (in Slovene)
(C) Champions; (O) Play-off winners; (R) Relegated

=== Relegation play-offs ===
7 June 1997
17:00 CEST

Beltinci	1–0	Drava Ptuj
Dzafič 81'

Sports Park, Beltinci
Attendance: 1,500
Referee: Stevo Govedarević
12 June 1997
17:00 CEST

Drava Ptuj	0–0	Beltinci

City Stadium, Ptuj
Attendance: 2,200
Referee: Drago Kos

Beltinci won 1–0 on aggregate.

== Results ==
Every team plays four times against their opponents, twice at home and twice on the road, for a total of 36 matches.

=== First half of the season ===
Home \ Away	BEL	CEL	GOR	KOP	KPR	MAR	MUR	OLI	PRI	RUD
Beltinci		2–1	0–3	2–1	2–1	1–2	0–1	1–2	2–1	1–1
Celje	1–1		1–1	6–2	3–1	1–1	3–2	1–0	2–1	1–2
Gorica	1–0	3–3		2–0	2–0	1–1	2–0	2–0	1–2	0–1
Koper	3–2	1–4	0–0		0–0	2–1	0–1	0–0	0–1	1–0
Korotan Prevalje	2–0	0–0	0–0	2–0		0–1	1–0	0–2	0–0	0–1
Maribor	4–1	3–0	3–0	4–1	5–0		1–1	0–0	1–0	2–1
Mura	1–3	2–1	2–2	1–0	2–0	1–1		3–0	1–3	1–1
Olimpija	1–1	2–1	3–4	3–1	0–1	1–0	6–2		1–1	1–2
Primorje	7–0	2–0	3–0	5–0	3–0	1–0	3–0	1–1		2–0
Rudar Velenje	5–0	0–1	1–0	1–0	3–3	1–6	0–0	2–4	1–1	

Source: PrvaLiga (in Slovene)
Legend: Blue = home team win; Yellow = draw; Red = away team win.

=== Second half of the season ===
Home \ Away	BEL	CEL	GOR	KOP	KPR	MAR	MUR	OLI	PRI	RUD
Beltinci		3–3	0–0	2–1	1–1	0–3	1–1	0–0	1–0	1–1
Celje	3–2		0–2	0–2	2–1	1–1	1–0	2–5	0–0	2–0
Gorica	4–2	4–0		2–1	1–0	4–2	1–1	2–0	1–0	0–0
Koper	1–0	2–1	2–2		0–0	1–1	2–0	2–1	0–0	1–2
Korotan Prevalje	2–0	0–1	0–1	2–0		3–0	1–0	1–0	2–1	3–2
Maribor	5–1	3–1	2–0	3–0	2–1		0–1	5–2	1–0	2–0
Mura	2–2	2–2	1–1	1–0	0–2	1–1		0–0	2–1	1–1
Olimpija	2–2	2–2	0–1	2–0	1–1	1–2	1–1		2–2	4–1
Primorje	1–0	4–0	1–0	4–1	3–1	2–0	0–0	3–1		2–2
Rudar Velenje	1–0	2–2	1–2	3–0	0–0	0–2	1–1	2–3	1–3	

Source: PrvaLiga (in Slovene)
Legend: Blue = home team win; Yellow = draw; Red = away team win.

== Top goalscorers ==
Rank	Player	Club	Goals
1	(Bosnia and Herzegovina) Faik Kamberović	Celje	21
2	(Slovenia) Ivica Vulič	Primorje	17
3	(Slovenia) Štefan Škaper	Mura	14
3	(Slovenia) Aljoša Sivko	Celje	14
3	(Slovenia) Oskar Drobne	Maribor	14
3	(Bosnia and Herzegovina) Dinko Vrabac	Primorje	14
7	(Slovenia) Samo Vidovič	Rudar Velenje	11
8	(Slovenia) Emir Dzafič	Beltinci	10
8	(Slovenia) Anton Žlogar	Primorje	10
8	(Slovenia) Milan Osterc	Gorica	10

== See also ==
- 1996 Slovenian Supercup
- 1996–97 Slovenian Football Cup
- 1996–97 Slovenian Second League
