= FC Koper =

Slovenian football club

Koper
- Full name: Football Club Koper
- Nicknames: Kanarčki (The Canaries); Rumeno-modri (The Yellow and Blues)
- Founded: 1920; 106 years ago (as Circolo sportivo Capodistriano)
- Ground: Bonifika
- Capacity: 4,047
- President: Ante Guberac
- Head coach: Milan Anđelković
- League: Slovenian PrvaLiga
- 2025–26: Slovenian PrvaLiga, 2nd of 10
- Website: fckoper.si
Home colours	Away colours	Third colours

Football Club Koper, commonly referred to as FC Koper or simply Koper, is a Slovenian football club based in the Istrian city of Koper that competes in the Slovenian First League, the top flight of Slovenian football. The club was founded in 1920. They won the Slovenian First League once, in the 2009–10 season, and the Slovenian Cup four times, most recently in 2021–22.

The club's home ground is Bonifika Stadium, which has a capacity for 4,047 spectators.

== History ==
The club was formed as Circolo sportivo Capodistriano in 1920. The team was made up of students, workers and fishermen. Its colours were black and white. In 1928, the club was renamed as Unione sportiva Capodistriana. Six years later, the club was renamed as Libertas.

After World War II, the club became part of a larger sports association and renamed as Aurora. By 1948, there were five clubs operating in the Koper area: Aurora, Meduza, Partizan, Edilit, and Adria. In 1955, Aurora and Meduza merged, creating NK Koper. The club played under this name in different Yugoslav leagues until 1991 and was one of the most successful Slovenian clubs. After Slovenia's independence, the club played in the Slovenian PrvaLiga. At the beginning of the 1990s, the club was achieving mid-table success. By the end of the 1990s, the club had been relegated to the second division twice, had serious financial problems, and renamed as FC Koper. With the advent of the new millennium, Koper consistently achieved positions in the upper half of the table. In 2002, they competed in the 2002 UEFA Intertoto Cup, their first international competition. Two years of mid-table anonymity and significant financial difficulties followed, in part because the former owner, Georg Suban, left substantial debts to the club and took half of the team with him when he moved to the other Slovenian PrvaLiga team, Mura.

The fans took control of the club and tried to improve its finances to save it from going bankrupt like three other major Slovenian clubs (Olimpija, Mura and Ljubljana), with reasonable success. In the 2005–06 season, Mladen Rudonja returned to the club and brought with him the Serbian-American businessman Milan Mandarić, who paid off all the remaining debts. After the first half of the season, before the arrival of the new patron, Koper was battling against relegation, but in the second part of the season, with a new coach, Milivoj Bračun, the club started an unbeaten run that led them to reach the third place in the Slovenian PrvaLiga and to win the Slovenian Cup for the first time. This also qualified the team to play in the UEFA Cup qualifying rounds in the 2006–07 season. The following seasons were more difficult, with the club narrowly avoiding relegation in 2009. In the 2009–10 season, the team was expanded and, under the leadership of veteran player Miran Pavlin, eventually won the Slovenian PrvaLiga championship for the first time, securing a place in the UEFA Champions League qualifiers, where they were defeated by Dinamo Zagreb 5–4 on aggregate (1–5, 3–0). In the aftermath, Pavlin left the club.

Following the 2016–17 season, Koper failed to obtain a competition licence and was excluded from the Slovenian top division.

=== Name changes ===
- 1920: Formed as Circolo sportivo Capodistriano
- 1928: Renamed as Unione sportiva Capodistriana
- 1946: Renamed as Aurora Koper
- 1955: Merger of Aurora Koper and Meduza Koper to form NK Koper
- 1990: Renamed as FC Koper Capodistria
- 2001: Renamed as Sport Line Koper (sponsorship)
- 2005: Renamed as FC Anet Koper (sponsorship)
- 2008: Renamed as FC Luka Koper (sponsorship)
- 2017: Renamed as FC Koper

== Stadium ==
Bonifika Stadium

Bonifika Stadium is the team's home ground, named after the area where it is situated in the town of Koper. The stadium was built in 1948. In 2010, the stadium underwent extensive reconstruction and its current capacity is 4,047 seats.

== Current squad ==
As of 14 August 2026

Note: Flags indicate national team as defined under FIFA eligibility rules; some limited exceptions apply. Players may hold more than one non-FIFA nationality.

No.	Pos.	Nation	Player
1	GK	SLO	Luka Baš
3	DF	GER	Florian Hartherz
4	MF	SLO	Leo Štulac
5	DF	SRB	Filip Bačkulja
6	MF	CRO	Fran Tomek
8	FW	SEN	Bassirou N'Diaye
9	FW	NGR	Brown Irabor
10	FW	SLO	Leo Rimac
11	MF	FRA	Ilann Petrisot
12	GK	SLO	Tijan Krošelj
14	MF	SLO	Jan Strcaj
16	DF	SLO	Bor Pirih Kerma
17	MF	SLO	Aleksej Šutalo
18	DF	ITA	Giuseppe Agyemang

No.	Pos.	Nation	Player
22	MF	FRA	Check Oumar Diakité
25	MF	FRA	Bangaly Diawara
26	MF	SLO	Benjamin Adrović
27	MF	SLO	Andraž Ruedl
28	GK	SLO	Lan Jovanović
29	DF	SLO	Luka Guček
32	DF	SRB	Veljko Mijailović
45	MF	FRA	Isaac Matondo
47	DF	ESP	Álvaro Roncal
67	MF	FRA	Omar El Manssouri
69	DF	FRA	Brice Negouai
72	MF	SLO	Josip Iličić
86	MF	AUT	Stefano Surdanović
99	MF	FRA	Kamil Manseri

== Honours ==
=== Yugoslavia ===
League

- Slovenian Republic League (third tier in Yugoslavia)
  - Winners: 1984–85, 1987–88
  - Runners-up: 1986–87

Cup

- Slovenian Republic Cup
  - Winners: 1989–90, 1990–91
  - Runners-up: 1988–89

=== Slovenia ===
League

- Slovenian First League
  - Winners: 2009–10
  - Runners-up: 2007–08, 2013–14, 2021–22, 2025–26
- Slovenian Second League
  - Winners: 1999–2000
  - Runners-up: 1997–98
- Slovenian Third League
  - Winners: 2018–19
- Littoral League (fourth tier)
  - Winners: 2017–18

Cup

- Slovenian Cup
  - Winners: 2005–06, 2006–07, 2014–15, 2021–22
  - Runners-up: 2008–09, 2024–25
- Slovenian Supercup
  - Winners: 2010, 2015
  - Runners-up: 2007
- MNZ Koper Cup
  - Winners: 2017–18, 2018–19

== Domestic league and cup results ==
=== In Yugoslavia ===
- 1947–48: 4th (STO League)
- 1948–49: 1st (STO League)
- 1949–50: 3rd (STO League)
- 1950–51: 3rd (STO League)
- 1951–52: 4th (STO League)
- 1952–53: 1st (STO League)
- 1953–54: 4th (Slovenian Republic League)
- 1954–55: 6th (Slovenian Republic League)
- 1955–56: 9th (Ljubljana-Littoral League)
- 1956–57: 2nd (Littoral League)
- 1957–58: 1st (Littoral League)
- 1958–59: 5th (Littoral League)
- 1959–60: 3rd (Littoral League)
- 1960–61: 2nd (Koper Subassociation League)
- 1961–62: 2nd (Koper Subassociation League)
- 1962–63: 1st (Koper Subassociation League)
- 1963–64: 1st (Koper Subassociation League)
- 1964–65: 1st (Slovenian Regional League – West)
- 1965–66: 12th (Slovenian Republic League)
- 1966–67: 1st (Slovenian Regional League – West)
- 1967–68: 6th (Slovenian Republic League)
- 1968–69: 11th (Slovenian Republic League)
- 1969–70: 3rd (Slovenian Regional League – West)
- 1970–71: 1st (Slovenian Regional League – West)
- 1971–72: 5th (Slovenian Republic League)
- 1972–73: 10th (Slovenian Republic League)
- 1973–74: 7th (Slovenian Republic League)
- 1974–75: 14th (Slovenian Republic League)
- 1975–76: 10th (Slovenian Regional League – West)
- 1976–77: 3rd (Koper Subassociation League)
- 1977–78: no senior team in league system
- 1978–79: no senior team in league system
- 1979–80: 1st (Slovenian Regional League – West)
- 1980–81: 9th (Slovenian Republic League)
- 1981–82: 11th (Slovenian Republic League)
- 1982–83: 4th (Slovenian Republic League)
- 1983–84: 4th (Slovenian Republic League)
- 1984–85: 1st (Slovenian Republic League)
- 1985–86: 18th (Yugoslav Second League)
- 1986–87: 2nd (Slovenian Republic League)
- 1987–88: 1st (Slovenian Republic League)
- 1988–89: 5th (Yugoslav Inter-Republic League)
- 1989–90: 14th (Yugoslav Inter-Republic League)
- 1990–91: 12th (Yugoslav Inter-Republic League)

=== In Slovenia ===
Season	League	Position	Pts	P	W	D	L	GF	GA	Cup
1991–92	1. SNL	8	43	40	15	13	12	38	33	Round of 16
1992–93	1. SNL	8	35	34	11	13	10	41	45	Round of 16
1993–94	1. SNL	7	32	30	11	10	9	43	38	First round
1994–95	1. SNL	11↓	26	30	9	8	13	24	34	First round
1995–96	2. SNL	6↑	41	29	11	8	10	33	30	Round of 16
1996–97	1. SNL	10↓	31	36	8	7	21	28	61	did not qualify
1997–98	2. SNL	2↑	68	30	20	8	2	75	20	First round
1998–99	1. SNL	11↓	32	33	8	8	17	34	61	did not qualify
1999–2000	2. SNL	1↑	72	30	22	6	2	76	21	Round of 16
2000–01	1. SNL	6	46	33	12	10	11	43	43	did not qualify
2001–02	1. SNL	3	56	33	15	11	7	45	26	Round of 16
2002–03	1. SNL	5	45	31	12	9	10	41	41	First round
2003–04	1. SNL	4	50	32	13	11	8	41	32	Round of 16
2004–05	1. SNL	11	36	32	9	9	14	38	41	Round of 16
2005–06	1. SNL	3	57	36	16	9	11	49	39	Winners
2006–07	1. SNL	6	45	36	10	15	11	51	46	Winners
2007–08	1. SNL	2	64	36	18	10	8	68	50	Semi-finals
2008–09	1. SNL	8	42	36	10	12	14	39	47	Runners-up
2009–10	1. SNL	1	73	36	21	10	5	59	35	Round of 16
2010–11	1. SNL	3	60	36	17	9	10	57	43	Semi-finals
2011–12	1. SNL	4	58	36	16	10	10	48	35	Quarter-finals
2012–13	1. SNL	4	55	36	14	13	9	52	42	Quarter-finals
2013–14	1. SNL	2	69	36	21	6	9	52	36	First round
2014–15	1. SNL	8	40	36	12	4	20	35	58	Winners
2015–16	1. SNL	8	40	36	11	7	18	40	54	Quarter-finals
2016–17 (Note: Relegated to the fourth division after failing to obtain a licence.)	1. SNL	6↓	50	36	12	14	10	43	40	Round of 16
2017–18	Littoral League	1↑	65	23	21	2	0	118	2	Round of 16
2018–19	3. SNL	1↑	71	28	23	2	3	111	15	Quarter-finals
2019–20 (Note: The season was not completed due to the COVID-19 pandemic, and the competition winner was not declared.)	2. SNL	1↑	44	20	13	5	2	42	13	Quarter-finals
2020–21	1. SNL	9	42	36	11	9	16	41	56	Semi-finals
2021–22	1. SNL	2	67	36	19	10	7	54	38	Winners
2022–23	1. SNL	6	50	36	14	8	14	46	40	Quarter-finals
2023–24	1. SNL	5	48	36	12	12	12	51	49	Quarter-finals
2024–25	1. SNL	3	66	36	19	9	8	60	35	Runners-up
2025–26	1. SNL	2	67	34	20	7	7	71	43	Second round

Key

- P – Matches played
- W – Matches won
- D – Matches drawn
- L – Matches lost
- GF – Goals for
- GA – Goals against
- Pts – Points

Winners	Runners-up	Promoted ↑	Relegated ↓

== Record in UEFA competitions ==
All results (home and away) list Koper's goal tally first.

Season	Competition	Round	Opposition	Home	Away	Agg.
2002	Intertoto Cup	1R	(Sweden) Helsingborgs IF	0–0	0–1	0–1
2003	Intertoto Cup	1R	(Croatia) Zagreb	1–0	2–2	3–2
2003	Intertoto Cup	2R	(Slovakia) Dubnica	1–0	2–3	3–3 (a)
2003	Intertoto Cup	3R	(Greece) Egaleo	2–2	3–2	5–4
2003	Intertoto Cup	SF	(Netherlands) Heerenveen	1–0	0–2	1–2
2006–07	UEFA Cup	1Q	(Bulgaria) Litex Lovech	0–1	0–5	0–6
2007–08	UEFA Cup	1Q	(Bosnia and Herzegovina) Široki Brijeg	2–3	1–3	3–6
2008–09	UEFA Cup	1Q	(Albania) Vllaznia	1–2	0–0	1–2
2010–11	UEFA Champions League	2Q	(Croatia) Dinamo Zagreb	3–0	1–5	4–5
2011–12	UEFA Europa League	1Q	(Kazakhstan) Shakhter Karagandy	1–1	1–2	2–3
2014–15	UEFA Europa League	1Q	(Montenegro) Čelik Nikšić	4–0	5–0	9–0
2014–15	UEFA Europa League	2Q	(Azerbaijan) Neftchi Baku	0–2	2–1	2–3
2015–16	UEFA Europa League	1Q	(Iceland) Víkingur Reykjavík	2–2	1–0	3–2
2015–16	UEFA Europa League	2Q	(Croatia) Hajduk Split	3–2	1–4	4–6
2022–23	UEFA Europa Conference League	2Q	(Liechtenstein) Vaduz	0–1	1–1 (a.e.t.)	1–2
2025–26	UEFA Conference League	1Q	(Bosnia and Herzegovina) Željezničar	3–1	1–1	4–2
2025–26	UEFA Conference League	2Q	(Norway) Viking	3–5	0–7	3–12
2026–27	UEFA Conference League	2Q	(Faroe Islands) NSÍ	1–3 (a.e.t.)	2–0	3–3 (3–4 p)

Key

- 1Q: First qualifying round
- 2Q: Second qualifying round
- 1R: First round
- 2R: Second round
- 3R: Third round
- SF: Semi-final
