= Grafičar =

Grafičar may refer to:

- FK Grafičar Podgorica, Montenegrin football club in Podgorica
- FK Grafičar Beograd, Serbian football club in Belgrade
- NK Grafičar Vodovod, Croatian football club
- NK Grafičar Ljubljana, Slovenian football club
