= Robert Oblak =

Slovenian footballer

Personal information
- Full name: Robert Oblak
- Date of birth: 3 May 1968 (age 58)
- Place of birth: Ljubljana, SFR Yugoslavia
- Position: Defender

Senior career*
Years	Team	Apps	(Gls)
1988–1992	Olimpija		
1992–1993	Krka	32	(3)
1993–1994	Naklo	25	(2)
1994	Olimpija	11	(0)
1996–1997	APOEL	0	(0)
1997	SV Feldkirchen		
1998–1999	DSG Ferlach		
1999–2000	Rudar Velenje	26	(2)
2000	Ivančna Gorica	5	(0)
2001	Ljubljana	25	(6)
2002	Zagorje	7	(1)

International career
1994	Slovenia	3	(0)
- * Club domestic league appearances and goals

Robert Oblak (born 3 May 1968) is a Slovenian retired footballer.

== Career ==
Oblak has been capped three times for the Slovenian national team in 1994.
