= NK Železničar Maribor =

Železničar Maribor
- Full name: Nogometni klub Železničar Maribor
- Nickname(s): Ajzenponarji (The Railroaders); Modro-beli (The Blue and Whites)
- Founded: 1927; 98 years ago
- Dissolved: 2019; 6 years ago
- Ground: Tabor Sports Park
| Home colours | Away colours |

Nogometni klub Železničar Maribor (English: Železničar Maribor Football Club), commonly referred to as NK Železničar Maribor or simply Železničar, was a Slovenian football club from Maribor. They qualified for the top division of Slovenian football, the Slovenian PrvaLiga, in the 1992–93 season, but were relegated in their first season, never returning to the top level. They were one of the most successful Slovenian clubs in the Yugoslav era, winning the Slovenian Republic League four times and the Slovenian Republic Cup twice.

== History ==
The club was established in 1927 as a football section of SK Železničar, the railway workers' sports club. They played their first match on 7 August of the same year and won 5–1 against SK Merkur. They joined Slovenian competitions, playing in the Maribor region, where they soon developed a fierce rivalry with I. SSK Maribor.

In the Ljubljana Subassociation League, Železničar finished second in 1934 and 1935, before finally winning their first title in 1937. In the qualifiers for the Yugoslav First League, they lost against SAŠK Sarajevo in the final. Železničar won another title in 1940, this time in a knockout system, beating their rivals I. SSK Maribor 2–1 in the final. The club was refounded as SFD Železničar after the World War II. In 1946, they finished second behind Lendava, missing promotion to the Yugoslav top division by only two points.

Železničar then stabilised as a mid-table team in the next years, until the league system was changed in 1952. They were located in the East group of the Republic League, where they finished second in 1953 and first in 1954. They have defeated the West group winners Piran (6–0 and 1–2) for the unofficial title and thus qualified for the Croatian-Slovenian League. The team was renamed to ŽNK Maribor and finished tenth, missing out Branik Maribor and ninth spot by one point and was therefore relegated to the Maribor-Varaždin-Celje Zonal League. They have won their first Slovenian Republic Cup in 1957. After three mediocre seasons the team returned to the unified Slovenian Republic League, which was reformed in 1958. In 1960, they have won another Slovenian Republic Cup title.

In December 1960, due to Branik Maribor's food poisoning affair, ŽNK Maribor, holding the first position on the league table, had to give up their place to a newly formed NK Maribor and were relegated. Maribor have won the title with the squad formed mostly of players from the ŽNK. They instantly returned to the Republic League in 1962 and renamed back to NK Železničar Maribor in the same year.

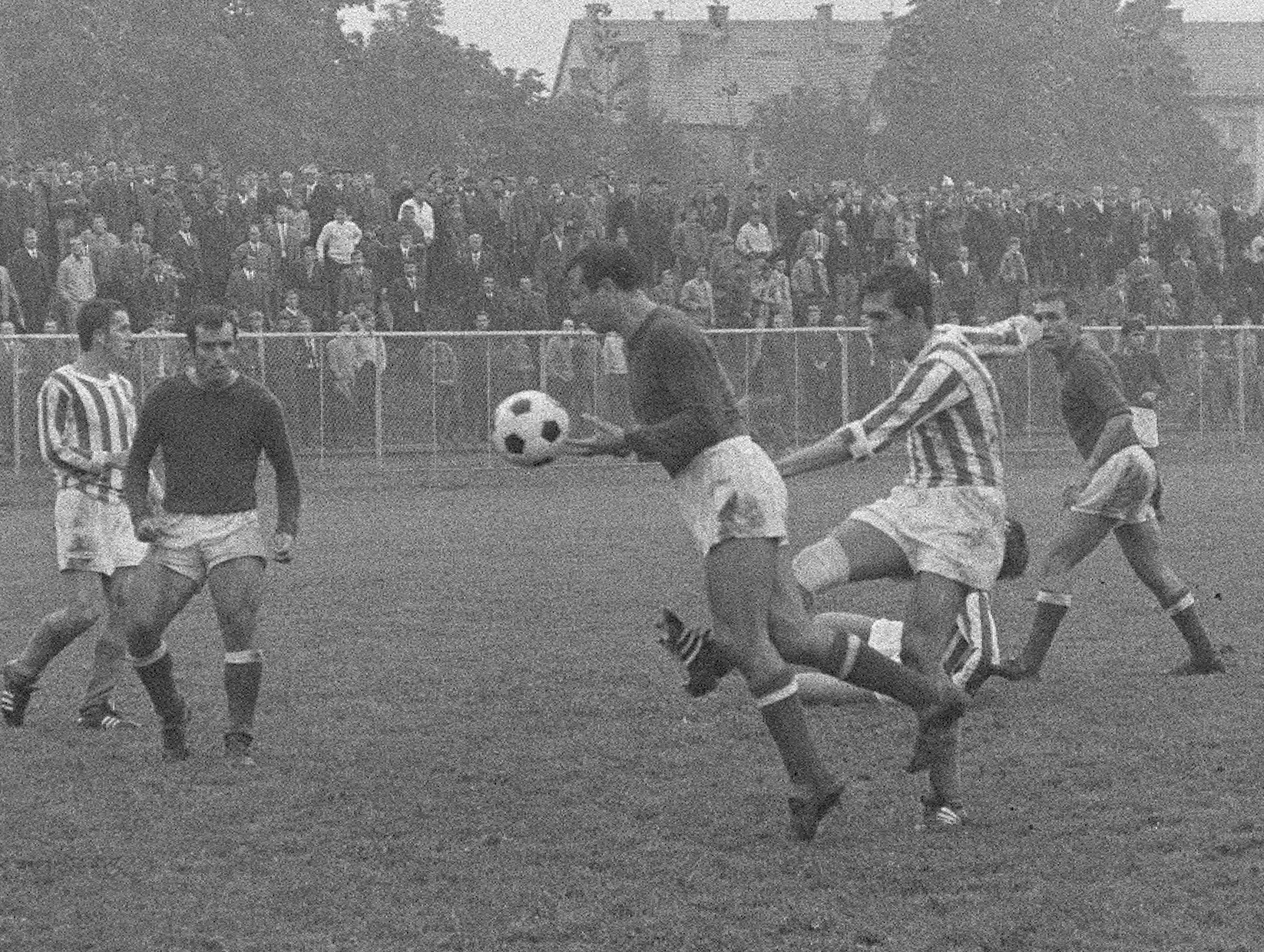
NK Železničar Maribor vs HNK Šibenik in 1969, Yugoslav Second League

The results soon improved and the club won their third republic title in 1968–69, earning a place in the Yugoslav Second League for the first time in history. They stayed there for three seasons and were relegated in 1971–72 after finishing in 18th place.

They have won another republic title in 1972–73, but lost in the Yugoslav Second League (West) play-ofs against Mercator Ljubljana. Železničar then played several republic seasons without any notable success. In 1981, despite scoring only fourth position, the Football Association of Yugoslavia offered them a place in the Yugoslav Second League, but the club declined promotion due to lack of funds. They were struggling against relegation in the next years, until they were finally relegated to the regional league for the first time in 1987. They stayed there until the breakup of Yugoslavia. Železničar holds a record of 42 played seasons in the Slovenian Republic League.

Železničar was one of the founding members of the Slovenian Second League in 1991. They have immediately finished first and earned a promotion to the first division in the 1991–92 season, managed by their former player Jože Karmel. Železničar played in the 1992–93 Slovenian PrvaLiga, the top level of Slovenian football, but was relegated after finishing 17th, never returning to the top flight again. The club was close to return on several occasions as they refused promotion in 1996, lost the play-offs against Beltinci in the 1997–98 season, and missed a second place by one point in the 1998–99 season. At the beginning of the new century, Železničar became financially unstable and was relegated to the lowest division over the course of several years; from the Second League in 2003 after finishing dead last, from the Slovenian Third League in 2007, having not fulfilled the licence documentation, from the fourth division in 2008, and even from the fifth division in 2014, before ceasing all operations in 2019.

== Stadium ==
The club built its first ground, the Ob Tržaški Cesti Stadium (Slovene: Stadion ob Tržaški cesti), between 1932 and 1935. After a few seasons at their temporary home ground in Poljane (Železničar lost their original home ground due to the construction of a new bridge in 1963), they moved to the newly built Tabor Sports Park (Slovene: Športni park Tabor) in 1967.

== Colours ==
Železničar's traditional kit

The traditional colours of the club were blue and white, the colours of the first Yugoslav Railways and then Slovenian Railways, used by all railway clubs in the country.

== Honours ==
=== Yugoslavia ===
- Slovenian Republic League
  - Winners (4): 1936–37, 1939–40, 1968–69, 1972–73
  - Runners-up (5): 1933–34, 1934–35, 1937–38, 1940–41, 1946
- Slovenian Republic Cup
  - Winners (2): 1957, 1960

=== Slovenia ===
- Slovenian Second League
  - Winners (1): 1991–92
- 1. MNZ Maribor (fifth tier)
  - Runners-up (1): 2009–10
- 2. MNZ Maribor (sixth tier)
  - Runners-up (1): 2014–15
- 3. MNZ Maribor (sixth tier)
  - Runners-up (1): 2015–16

== Domestic league and cup results ==
=== In Yugoslavia ===
| Season | League | Position |
|---|---|---|
| 1927–28 | Ljubljana Subassociation League | 4th in Maribor subdivision |
| 1928–29 | Ljubljana Subassociation League | 3rd in Maribor subdivision |
| 1929–30 | Ljubljana Subassociation League | 3rd in Maribor subdivision |
| 1930–31 | Ljubljana Subassociation League | 2nd in Maribor subdivision |
| 1931–32 | Ljubljana Subassociation League | 4th |
| 1932–33 | Ljubljana Subassociation League | 3rd |
| 1933–34 | Ljubljana Subassociation League | 2nd |
| 1934–35 | Ljubljana Subassociation League | 2nd |
| 1935–36 | Ljubljana Subassociation League | 3rd |
| 1936–37 | Ljubljana Subassociation League | 1st |
| 1937–38 | Ljubljana Subassociation League | 2nd |
| 1938–39 | Ljubljana Subassociation League | Quarter-final |
| 1939–40 | Ljubljana Subassociation League | Winners |
| 1940–41 | Ljubljana Subassociation League | 2nd |
| 1941–45 | World War II | |
| 1946 | Slovenian Republic League | 2nd (Note: Lost in promotion play-offs for the Yugoslav First Division.) |
| 1946–47 | Slovenian Republic League | 6th |
| 1947–48 | Slovenian Republic League | 3rd |
| 1948–49 | Slovenian Republic League | 5th |
| 1950 | Slovenian Republic League | 6th |
| 1951 | Slovenian Republic League | 6th |
| 1952 | Slovenian Republic League | 7th |
| 1952–53 | Slovenian Republic League | 2nd in East group (Note: Lost in promotion play-offs for the Croatian-Slovenian League.) |
| 1953–54 | Slovenian Republic League | 1st in East group (Note: Won in promotion play-offs for the Croatian-Slovenian League.) |
| 1954–55 | Croatian-Slovenian League | 10th |
| 1955–56 | Maribor-Varaždin-Celje League | 5th |
| 1956–57 | Maribor-Varaždin-Celje League | 4th |
| 1957–58 | Maribor-Varaždin-Celje League | 3rd |
| 1958–59 | Slovenian Republic League | 4th |
| 1959–60 | Slovenian Republic League | 3rd |
| 1960–61* | Slovenian Republic League; Maribor Subassociation League | 1st 6th (Note: Železničar finished the first part of the season in first place. During the winter break, NK Maribor was formed, which took over the points and the league place of Železničar. Almost all players transferred from Železničar to Maribor, and Maribor went on to win the Republic League. Železničar (what was left of it) was transferred to the fourth division, where they started with zero points at the bottom of the table. However, they still managed to finish in sixth place.) |
| 1961–62 | Maribor Subassociation League | 1st (Note: Won in promotion play-offs for the Slovenian Republic League.) |
| 1962–63 | Slovenian Republic League | 7th |
| 1963–64 | Slovenian Republic League | 11th |
| 1964–65 | Slovenian Republic League | 3rd |
| 1965–66 | Slovenian Republic League | 6th |
| 1966–67 | Slovenian Republic League | 3rd |
| 1967–68 | Slovenian Republic League | 8th |
| 1968–69 | Slovenian Republic League | 1st |
| 1969–70 | Yugoslav Second League (West) | 7th |
| 1970–71 | Yugoslav Second League (West) | 11th |
| 1971–72 | Yugoslav Second League (West) | 18th |
| 1972–73 | Slovenian Republic League | 1st (Note: Lost in promotion play-offs for the Yugoslav Second League.) |
| 1973–74 | Slovenian Republic League | 4th |
| 1974–75 | Slovenian Republic League | 10th |
| 1975–76 | Slovenian Republic League | 4th |
| 1976–77 | Slovenian Republic League | 11th |
| 1977–78 | Slovenian Republic League | 9th |
| 1978–79 | Slovenian Republic League | 6th |
| 1979–80 | Slovenian Republic League | 4th |
| 1980–81 | Slovenian Republic League | 4th |
| 1981–82 | Slovenian Republic League | 7th |
| 1982–83 | Slovenian Republic League | 10th |
| 1983–84 | Slovenian Republic League | 6th |
| 1984–85 | Slovenian Republic League | 7th |
| 1985–86 | Slovenian Republic League | 11th |
| 1986–87 | Slovenian Republic League | 13th |
| 1987–88 | Slovenian Regional League (East) | 7th |
| 1988–89 | Slovenian Regional League (East) | 6th |
| 1989–90 | Slovenian Regional League (East) | 4th |
| 1990–91 | Slovenian Regional League (East) | 3rd |

=== In Slovenia ===
| Season | League | Position | Pts | P | W | D | L | GF | GA | Cup |
|---|---|---|---|---|---|---|---|---|---|---|
| 1991–92 | 2. SNL | 1 | 36 | 26 | 14 | 8 | 4 | 38 | 19 | Round of 64 |
| 1992–93 | 1. SNL | 17 | 20 | 34 | 6 | 8 | 20 | 30 | 62 | First round |
| 1993–94 | 2. SNL | 13 | 24 (−1) | 30 | 10 | 5 | 15 | 36 | 50 | First round |
| 1994–95 | 2. SNL | 10 | 31 | 30 | 13 | 5 | 12 | 43 | 47 | x |
| 1995–96 | 2. SNL | 5 | 44 | 29 | 13 | 5 | 11 | 51 | 47 | First round |
| 1996–97 | 2. SNL | 9 | 37 | 29 | 10 | 7 | 12 | 37 | 33 | Round of 16 |
| 1997–98 | 2. SNL | 4 | 51 | 30 | 14 | 9 | 7 | 52 | 39 | Round of 16 |
| 1998–99 | 2. SNL | 3 | 54 | 30 | 15 | 9 | 6 | 58 | 30 | x |
| 1999–2000 | 2. SNL | 5 | 53 | 30 | 16 | 5 | 9 | 47 | 32 | Round of 16 |
| 2000–01 | 2. SNL | 10 | 37 | 29 | 10 | 7 | 12 | 40 | 49 | First round |
| 2001–02 | 2. SNL | 10 | 39 | 30 | 11 | 6 | 13 | 37 | 44 | Quarter-finals |
| 2002–03 | 2. SNL | 16 | 18 | 30 | 4 | 6 | 20 | 23 | 69 | Round of 16 |
| 2003–04 | 3. SNL | 5 | 43 | 26 | 13 | 4 | 9 | 60 | 41 | First round |
| 2004–05 | 3. SNL | 11 | 30 | 26 | 8 | 6 | 12 | 35 | 45 | Second round |
| 2005–06 | 3. SNL | 11 | 25 | 26 | 6 | 7 | 13 | 31 | 51 | x |
| 2006–07 | 3. SNL | 12 | 29 | 26 | 9 | 2 | 15 | 32 | 50 | x |
| 2007–08 | Styrian League (4th level) | 13 | 21 | 26 | 7 | 0 | 19 | 38 | 87 | x |
| 2008–09 | 1. MNZ (5th level) | 3 | 45 | 26 | 13 | 6 | 7 | 60 | 38 | x |
| 2009–10 | 1. MNZ (5th level) | 2 | 55 | 26 | 17 | 4 | 5 | 90 | 26 | First round |
| 2010–11 | 1. MNZ (5th level) | 11 | 30 | 26 | 9 | 3 | 14 | 44 | 61 | x |
| 2011–12 | 1. MNZ (5th level) | 4 | 41 (−2) | 26 | 14 | 1 | 11 | 64 | 50 | x |
| 2012–13 | 1. MNZ (5th level) | 7 | 40 | 26 | 12 | 4 | 10 | 61 | 63 | x |
| 2013–14 | 1. MNZ (5th level) | 14 | 10 | 26 | 2 | 4 | 20 | 23 | 102 | x |
| 2014–15 | 2. MNZ (6th level) | 2 | 49 | 24 | 15 | 4 | 5 | 70 | 31 | x |
| 2015–16 | 3. MNZ (6th level) | 2 | 39 | 16 | 13 | 0 | 3 | 67 | 15 | x |
| 2016–17 | 2. MNZ (5th level) | Withdrew from the competition during the season. | | | | | | | | |

*Best results are highlighted.
*x = Did not qualify
