= NK Beltinci =

Beltinci
- Full name: Nogometni klub Beltinci
- Nickname: Kanarčki (The Canaries)
- Founded: 1949; 76 years ago (as Mladost Beltinci)
- Dissolved: 2006; 19 years ago
- Ground: Beltinci Sports Park
Home colours	Away colours

Nogometni klub Beltinci (English: Beltinci Football Club), commonly referred to as NK Beltinci or simply Beltinci, was a Slovenian football club which played in the town of Beltinci.

== History ==
NK Beltinci was founded in 1949 and ceased operations in 2006, when they were unable to obtain competition licences issued by the Football Association of Slovenia. The club played a total of nine seasons in the Slovenian top division, the Slovenian PrvaLiga.

In the summer of 2006, a successor club was founded under the name Nogometno društvo Žuti Marki, later renamed as ND Beltinci. The Football Association of Slovenia, however, legally keeps records of both clubs separately.

== League history since 1991 ==
Season	League	Position
1991–92	1. SNL	13th
1992–93	1. SNL	14th
1993–94	1. SNL	6th
1994–95	1. SNL	5th
1995–96	1. SNL	6th
1996–97	1. SNL	9th (Note: Won in relegation play-offs against NK Drava Ptuj.)
1997–98	1. SNL	9th (Note: Won in relegation play-offs against NK Železničar Maribor.)
1998–99	1. SNL	10th
1999–2000	1. SNL	12th
2000–01	2. SNL	13th
2001–02	3. SNL – East	10th
2002–03	3. SNL – East	2nd
2003–04	3. SNL – East	5th
2004–05	Pomurska League (level 4)	3rd
2005–06	3. SNL – East	14th
