= 1946 Slovenian Republic League =

Slovenian Republic League
- Season: 1946
- Champions: Lendava
- Matches played: 20
- Goals scored: 71 (3.55 per match)

The 1946 Slovenian Republic League was the 23rd season of the Slovenian Republic League and the first season as part of the country of SFR Yugoslavia. The league champions were Lendava.

== Final table ==
Pos	Team	Pld	W	D	L	GF	GA	GD	Pts
1	Lendava	8	6	1	1	16	11	+5	13
2	Železničar Maribor	8	4	3	1	17	8	+9	11
3	Železničar Ljubljana	8	5	1	2	21	10	+11	11
4	Rudar	8	2	0	6	10	16	−6	4
5	Olimp	8	0	1	7	7	26	−19	1

== Qualification for Yugoslav First League ==
21 July 1946

Borac Banja Luka	2–1	Železničar Maribor

Naprijed Stadium, Sisak
Attendance: 1,200
