= Alberto Eliani =

Italian footballer and manager (1922-2009)

Personal information
- Date of birth: 14 January 1922
- Place of birth: Trieste, Kingdom of Italy
- Date of death: 8 January 2009 (aged 86)
- Place of death: San Benedetto del Tronto, Italy
- Height: 1.77 m (5 ft 9 1/2 in)
- Position: Defender

Senior career*
Years	Team	Apps	(Gls)
1939–1941	Ponziana		
1941–1942	Fiorentina	0	(0)
1942–1943	Modena	16	(9)
1943–1944	Ampelea Isola d'Istria	14	(6)
1944–1945	Italcalcio		
1945–1950	Fiorentina	146	(4)
1950–1956	Roma	101	(0)

International career
1948	Italy	2	(0)

Managerial career
- 1960–1961: Brescia
- 1962–1964: Udinese
- 1965–1969: Sambenedettese
- 1969–1970: Del Duca Ascoli
- 1970–1971: Chieti
- 1971–1972: Massese
- 1972–1973: Trapani
- * Club domestic league appearances and goals

Alberto Eliani (Italian pronunciation: [alˈbɛrto eˈljaːni]; 14 January 1922 – 8 January 2009) was an Italian professional football player and manager, who played as a defender.

== Club career ==
Eliani played for 9 seasons (216 games, 4 goals) in the Serie A for ACF Fiorentina and A.S. Roma.

== International career ==
Eliani made his debut for the Italy national football team on 4 April 1948 against France. He also played in the match against England later that year, which Italy lost 0–4, and was never called up for the national team again.
