= 1997–98 Slovenian Second League =

Slovenian Second League
- Season: 1997–98
- Champions: Triglav Kranj
- Promoted: Triglav Kranj; Koper; Domžale
- Matches played: 240
- Goals scored: 697 (2.9 per match)
- Top goalscorer: Oliver Bogatinov (32 goals)

The 1997–98 Slovenian Second League season started on 16 August 1997 and ended on 7 June 1998. Each team played a total of 30 matches. Črnuče merged with Factor before the season.

== League standing ==
Pos	Team	Pld	W	D	L	GF	GA	GD	Pts	Promotion or qualification
1	Triglav Kranj (C, P)	30	25	3	2	81	17	+64	78	Promotion to Slovenian PrvaLiga
2	Koper (P)	30	20	8	2	75	20	+55	68	Promotion to Slovenian PrvaLiga
3	Domžale (O, P)	30	17	7	6	63	30	+33	58	Qualification to promotion play-offs
4	Železničar Maribor	30	14	9	7	52	39	+13	51	Qualification to promotion play-offs
5	Krka	30	14	6	10	51	53	−2	48	
6	Nafta Lendava	30	12	7	11	39	39	0	43	
7	Drava Ptuj	30	10	9	11	32	32	0	39	
8	Šmartno	30	9	11	10	44	42	+2	38	
9	Goriške Opekarne	30	9	9	12	46	48	−2	36	
10	Jadran Hrpelje-Kozina	30	8	8	14	29	59	−30	32	
11	Dravograd	30	7	10	13	37	46	−9	31	
12	Šentjur	30	7	10	13	25	40	−15	31	
13	Aluminij	30	8	7	15	34	50	−16	31	
14	Zagorje	30	8	7	15	32	51	−19	31	
15	Rudar Trbovlje (O)	30	7	8	15	25	41	−16	29	Qualification to relegation play-offs
16	Factor Črnuče (O)	30	4	3	23	32	90	−58	15	Qualification to relegation play-offs

Rules for classification: 1) points; 2) goal difference; 3) number of goals scored.
(C) Champions; (O) Play-off winners; (P) Promoted

=== Relegation play-offs ===
13 June 1998

Rudar Trbovlje	5–0	Bakovci

Rudar Stadium, Trbovlje
17 June 1998

Bakovci	1–0	Rudar Trbovlje

ŠRC Bakovci, Bakovci

Rudar Trbovlje won 5–1 on aggregate.

13 June 1998

Factor Črnuče	4–0	Svoboda

Štefan Bele Sports Park, Ljubljana
17 June 1998

Svoboda	5–3	Factor Črnuče

Svoboda Sports Park, Ljubljana

Factor Črnuče won 7–5 on aggregate.

== See also ==
- 1997–98 Slovenian PrvaLiga
- 1997–98 Slovenian Third League
