= NK Grafičar Ljubljana =

Grafičar
- Full name: Nogometni klub Grafičar Ljubljana
- Founded: 1948; 77 years ago
- Dissolved: 1958; 67 years ago
- Ground: Stadion ob Linhartovi cesti
Home colours

Nogometni klub Grafičar Ljubljana (English: Grafičar Ljubljana Football Club), commonly referred to as NK Grafičar or simply Grafičar, was a Slovenian football club from Ljubljana. They have won the Ljubljana-Littoral League in 1956. The club then merged with Svoboda in the late 1950s.
