= Ante Šimundža =

Slovenian footballer and manager (born 1971)

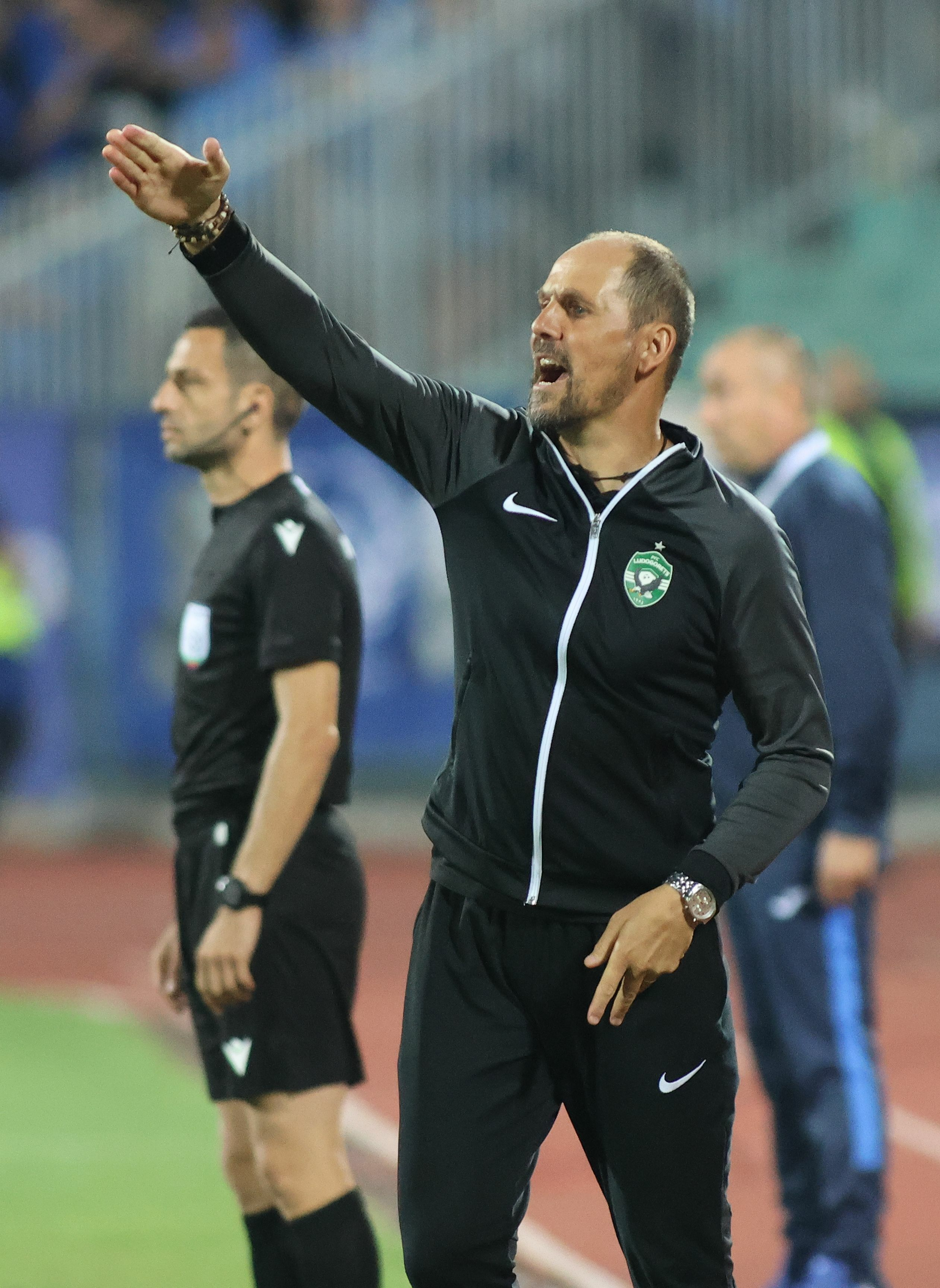
- Šimundža in 2022 with Ludogorets Razgrad

Personal information
- Date of birth: 28 September 1971 (age 55)
- Place of birth: Maribor, SR Slovenia, Yugoslavia
- Height: 1.82 m (6 ft 0 in)
- Position: Striker

Youth career
- Železničar Maribor

Senior career*
Years	Team	Apps	(Gls)
1991–1996	Maribor	170	(64)
1997	Brummell Sendai	22	(11)
1997	Maribor	2	(0)
1998	Young Boys	8	(0)
1998	Malmö FF	3	(0)
1999–2001	Maribor	56	(14)
2001	→ La Louvière (loan)	12	(5)
2002	Aluminij	15	(11)
2002–2003	Šmartno	28	(9)
2005–2007	SV Wildon	56	(17)
2008–2009	SV Straß	23	(10)

International career
1992	Slovenia U21	1	(0)
1993–1999	Slovenia	3	(0)

Managerial career
- 2008–2011: Maribor (assistant)
- 2011–2012: Mura 05
- 2012: Grazer AK
- 2013: Mura 05
- 2013: Aluminij
- 2013–2015: Maribor
- 2017–2021: Mura
- 2022–2023: Ludogorets Razgrad
- 2023–2024: Maribor
- 2024–2026: Śląsk Wrocław
- * Club domestic league appearances and goals

Ante Šimundža (born 28 September 1971) is a Slovenian professional football manager and former player who was most recently the manager of Ekstraklasa club Śląsk Wrocław.

== Club career ==
Šimundža started his career at hometown club Železničar Maribor at the age of eleven, and moved to NK Maribor after Slovenia's independence in 1991. He stayed there for six seasons, scoring 64 league goals in 170 appearances. He played for a number of different foreign clubs between 1997 and 1998, however, plagued by constant ankle injuries he soon returned to Maribor. There he was an important part of Maribor's qualification to the UEFA Champions League during the 1999–2000 season. He was the scorer of the winning goal in the first round of the group stage when Maribor defeated Dynamo Kyiv 1–0, which is to date the only victory of any Slovenian club in this phase of the competition. In 2001, he again moved abroad and played for La Louvière, before returning to his native country and finishing his professional career with Aluminij and Šmartno ob Paki. Šimundža has made a total of 256 Slovenian PrvaLiga appearances, scoring 87 goals in the process. Considered a Maribor club legend, he is tied with Gregor Židan as a player with the most appearances for the club during the 1990s.

== International career ==
Šimundža made three appearances for the Slovenia national team between 1993 and 1999.

== Managerial career ==
Šimundža began his coaching career at his hometown club Železničar Maribor, where he was coaching youth selections. He started his senior coaching career in 2007, when he was appointed as an assistant coach of Pavel Pinni at Celje. In 2008, he became an assistant of Darko Milanič at Maribor. He was part of Maribor's sports department until 2011 when he was selected as a head coach of Mura 05. His season with Mura 05 was impressive and he turned the team around, changing it from a relegation contender to the eventual UEFA competitions qualifier, as the club finished third during the 2011–12 Slovenian PrvaLiga season. By the end of his first season as head coach, he was nominated for the best coach in the league. He then accepted an offer from Austrian side GAK, signing with the club in June 2012. However, the club went bankrupt a few months later and Šimundža returned to Mura 05 in early 2013. After the 2012–13 season, Mura 05 also went bankrupt, and Šimundža took over the Slovenian Second League side Aluminij in June 2013.

In September 2013, Šimundža was appointed as the new manager of Slovenian champions Maribor. With Maribor, he won two national titles (2013–14 and 2014–15), and also qualified for the group stages of the 2014–15 UEFA Champions League. He resigned in August 2015 after losing 3–0 at home against Maribor's biggest rivals, Olimpija Ljubljana.

In June 2017, Šimundža once again took charge at Mura. With the club, he won the 2019–20 edition of the Slovenian Football Cup, clinching their first major trophy in 25 years. The following year, Mura became the Slovenian champion for the first time after winning the 2020–21 Slovenian PrvaLiga season. In the last round of the season, Šimundža defeated his former club Maribor to win the title. After four years at the club, he left by mutual consent in December 2021.

On 3 January 2022, Šimundža joined Bulgarian First League club Ludogorets Razgrad as their new head coach. He led the team to its eleventh consecutive league title in the 2021–22 season, before being sacked on 7 March 2023 following a 1–0 home defeat against Pirin Blagoevgrad.

On 3 October 2023, Šimundža returned to Maribor after eight years and signed a contract until the end of the 2025–26 season, replacing outgoing manager Damir Krznar.

On 24 December 2024, Šimundža was named manager of Polish club Śląsk Wrocław. Tasked with avoiding relegation, with the team placed last and eight points away from safety after 18 games, he signed a six-month contract. Despite Śląsk's form improving under Šimundža, the club finished the season in 17th place and was demoted to I liga. On 28 May 2025, he extended his deal with the club for another year. The following year, Šimundža led Śląsk to a runner-up finish, securing their promotion back to the Ekstraklasa. On 19 May 2026, his contract was prolonged until mid-2028. Shortly after a 3–1 away loss to Radomiak Radom on 2 November 2026—the club's sixth defeat in their last seven league games—Śląsk announced the sacking of Šimundža.

== Personal life ==
Šimundža was born in Maribor, present day Slovenia, as the youngest of two children, with his sister being six years older than him. His father was a Croat from Split and his mother a Slovene from Kidričevo. He is married and has two sons, Luka and Jure, who were named after their grandfathers.

== Honours ==
=== Manager ===
Maribor

- Slovenian First League: 2013–14, 2014–15
- Slovenian Supercup: 2014

Mura

- Slovenian First League: 2020–21
- Slovenian Second League: 2017–18
- Slovenian Cup: 2019–20

Ludogorets Razgrad

- Bulgarian First League: 2021–22
- Bulgarian Supercup: 2022

Individual

- Slovenian First League Manager of the Year: 2018–19, 2023–24
- I liga Coach of the Month: April 2026
