= NK Hrastnik =

Slovenian football club

Hrastnik
- Full name: Nogometni klub Hrastnik
- Founded: 1924; 101 years ago (as ŠK Edinost)
- Ground: Log Sports Park
- President: Valentina Moljk
- Website: www.nkhrastnik.si
Home colours	Away colours

Nogometni klub Hrastnik (English: Hrastnik Football Club), commonly referred to as NK Hrastnik or simply Hrastnik, is a Slovenian football club from Hrastnik which currently competes only with youth selections. The club was founded in 1924.

The club got its present name in the 1960s, when ŠD Rudar and NK Bratstvo merged to form NK Hrastnik. During the same period, the club also briefly played in the then highest Slovenian league, the Slovenian Republic League (third level in Yugoslavia).
