= NK Pohorje =

Slovenian football club

Pohorje
- Full name: Nogometni klub Pohorje Ruše
- Nickname: Zeleni (The Greens)
- Founded: 1956; 70 years ago
- Ground: Stadion NK Pohorje
- President: Mitja Golob Tošić
- Head coach: Zoran Brecelj
- League: 1. MNZ Maribor
- 2025–26: 1. MNZ Maribor, 7th of 12
- Website: www.nk-pohorje.si
Home colours	Away colours

Nogometni klub Pohorje (English: Pohorje Football Club), commonly referred to as NK Pohorje or simply Pohorje, is a Slovenian football club based in Ruše. The club competes in the 1. MNZ Maribor League, the fourth highest league in Slovenia.

== History ==
After World War II, football began to be played in an organized manner in Ruše with the establishment of the football section of the Telovadno društvo Ruše (Ruše Gymnasium Association), which was later renamed TVD Partizan Ruše. In 1955, there were disagreements and disputes between the football section and the management of TVD Partizan over the use of the football pitch. In the same year, the football section was expelled from the TVD Partizan Ruše, which was the reason for the football club's independent path.

On 26 May 1956, a new football club was founded in Ruše at the initiative of Adolf Muršič, Vili Dugonik, Edo Robič and Tonko Dumanič. When naming the club, they hesitated between "Pohorje" and "Drava", and for the club's colours, they chose between green-white and blue-white. After the vote, the club was named NK Pohorje, and the colour was chosen as green and white. Tonko Dumanič was elected as the first president of the club.

In the 1999–2000 season, Pohorje made its first and only appearance in the top flight Slovenian league, the Slovenian PrvaLiga. However, they were immediately relegated after finishing eleventh out of twelve teams.

== Honours ==
- Slovenian Second League
  - Runners-up: 1998–99
- Slovenian Third League
  - Winners: 1997–98, 2002–03
  - Runners-up: 1995–96, 1996–97
