= NK Stol Virtus =

Stol Virtus
- Full name: Nogometni Klub Stol Virtus
- Founded: 1930; 95 years ago (refounded 1975)
- Dissolved: 1991; 34 years ago
- Ground: Igrišče na Duplici
Home colours

Nogometni Klub Stol Virtus (English: Stol Virtus Football Club), commonly referred to as NK Stol Virtus or simply Stol, was a Slovenian football club from Kamnik. The club was formed as SK Virtus in 1930 in the industrial Kamnik settlement, Duplica. After World War II, it was renamed as NK Svoboda Duplica and competed in lower divisions until 1965, when it ceased to exist for a decade. Due to the financial collapse of the city rivals NK Kamnik and the sponsorship of the furniture company Stol, the club managed to take over the primacy in Kamnik. They were renamed as NK Stol and came all the way to the Slovenian first division in 1981. The club was later renamed as NK Stol Virtus, but withdrew from competitions in 1991.
