= Kodeljevo Sports Park =

Multi-use stadium in Ljubljana, Slovenia

Coordinates: 46°3′1.35″N 14°31′59.31″E

Kodeljevo Sports Park (Slovene: Športni park Kodeljevo) is a multi-purpose stadium in Ljubljana, Slovenia. It is currently used mostly for football matches and is the home ground of ND Slovan. The stadium opened in 1959 and the main stand was built in 1965.

It is located in a larger sports complex, which includes a multi-purpose arena, an Olympic swimming pool and tennis courts.
