= NK Šmartno ob Paki =

Šmartno
- Full name: Nogometni klub Šmartno ob Paki
- Founded: 1928; 97 years ago
- Dissolved: 2005; 20 years ago
- Ground: Šmartno Stadium
- Capacity: 717

Nogometni klub Šmartno ob Paki (English: Šmartno ob Paki Football Club), commonly referred to as NK Šmartno ob Paki or simply Šmartno, was a Slovenian football club from Šmartno ob Paki. The club was dissolved in 2005 due to financial difficulties. Shortly afterwards, a new club under the name of Šmartno 1928 was formed. However, they are legally not considered as the successors to the dissolved club and the statistics and track records of the two clubs are kept separate by the Football Association of Slovenia.

== History ==
Šmartno ob Paki spent three seasons in the Slovenian PrvaLiga, in which they earned 126 points in 96 matches. Their highest top division finish was fourth place, achieved in the 2002–03 season.

== Honours ==
League

- Slovenian Republic League
  - Winners: 1980–81
- Slovenian Second League
  - Winners: 1994–95
- Slovenian Third Division
  - Winners: 1991–92

Cup

- MNZ Celje Cup
  - Winners: 1993, 1998–99, 2000–01

== League history since 1991 ==
Season	League	Position	Notes
1991–92	MNZ Celje (level 3)	1st	Won play-offs for Slovenian Second League (2. SNL)
1992–93	2. SNL	9th	/
1993–94	2. SNL	6th	/
1994–95	2. SNL	1st	Lost play-offs for Slovenian PrvaLiga (1. SNL)
1995–96	2. SNL	9th	/
1996–97	2. SNL	12th	/
1997–98	2. SNL	8th	/
1998–99	2. SNL	4th	/
1999–2000	2. SNL	3rd	/
2000–01	2. SNL	2nd	Promoted to Slovenian PrvaLiga
2001–02	1. SNL	9th	/
2002–03	1. SNL	4th	/
2003–04	1. SNL	9th	Failed to obtain a licence. Relegated to Slovenian Second League.
2004–05	2. SNL	12th	Relegated to Slovenian Third League. Club dissolved.
