= NK Slavija Vevče =

Slavija Vevče
- Full name: Nogometni klub Slavija Vevče
- Founded: 1921; 104 years ago
- Dissolved: Late 1990s (merged with Slovan)
- Ground: Slavija Stadium
- Capacity: 1,000
Home colours	Away colours

Nogometni klub Slavija Vevče (English: Slavija Vevče Football Club), commonly referred to as NK Slavija Vevče or simply Slavija, was a Slovenian football club based in Vevče. The club was formed in 1921 and played in the Slovenian PrvaLiga in the 1994–95 season, after they replaced Svoboda before the start of the competition. They were sponsored by local printing company SET for most of the time, therefore their first team often played under the name SET Vevče rather than Slavija. In 1996, they merged with Slovan and moved to Kodeljevo to play there as ND Slovan-Slavija for three seasons. They have won the Slovenian Second League in 1996–97, but were then relegated from the first and second divisions in two seasons. After 1999, Slavija was eventually left out of the club's name, playing from then onwards only as Slovan.

== Honours ==
- Slovenian Second League
  - Winners: 1996–97
