= NK Piran (1925–1998) =

Slovenian football club

Piran
- Full name: Nogometni klub Piran
- Nickname: Gusarji (The Privateers)
- Founded: 1925; 101 years ago
- Dissolved: 1998; 28 years ago
- Ground: Pod Obzidjem Stadium

Nogometni klub Piran (English: Piran Football Club), commonly referred to as NK Piran or simply Piran, was a Slovenian football club from Piran. The club was founded in 1925 and was dissolved during the 1997–98 Slovenian Third League season, when a newly established club named NK Portorož Piran was founded. Piran played their home games at Pod Obzidjem Stadium.

== Honours ==
- Slovenian Third League

Winners: 1992–93
