= NK Nafta Lendava =

Association football club in Slovenia

Nafta Lendava
- Full name: Nogometni klub Nafta Lendava
- Nickname: Plavi (The Blues)
- Founded: 11 May 1903; 122 years ago (as Lendvai Football Egyesület)
- Dissolved: 2012; 13 years ago
- Ground: Lendava Sports Park
- Capacity: 2,000
Home colours	Away colours

Nogometni klub Nafta Lendava (English: Nafta Lendava Football Club), commonly referred to as NK Nafta Lendava or simply Nafta, was a Slovenian football club which played in the town of Lendava. The club was founded under the Hungarian name Lendvai Football Egyesület in 1903. They were regarded as the oldest Slovenian football club until they filed for bankruptcy and were dissolved following the 2011–12 Slovenian PrvaLiga season. The club played in the Yugoslav First League for one season, in 1946–47.

== History ==
The club was founded in 1903 under the Hungarian name Lendvai Football Egyesület. After World War I, the club was renamed as NK Lendava, and then as SK Lendava. In the mid-1930s, the club began to play in the second division of the Ljubljana Subassociation League. After the invasion of Yugoslavia in 1941, the Prekmurje region was annexed by the Kingdom of Hungary, and Lendava played in the Hungarian football system during World War II.

In 1946, the club won the first post-war national championship of Slovenia, thus qualifying for the top level Yugoslav First League for the 1946–47 season. Before the season, they also renamed as Nafta. However, they were immediately relegated after finishing last with 23 defeats out of 26 league games.

In the following decades, the club mainly played in the Slovenian Republic League and lower leagues in the territory of SR Slovenia.

After Slovenia's independence in 1991, Nafta joined the newly formed Slovenian PrvaLiga for the 1991–92 season. Their Croatian winger Miljenko Dovečer earned the distinction of scoring the very first goal of the new competition. They stayed in the top division for two seasons, as they were relegated in 1992–93 after finishing last. In the next decade, they competed in the 2. SNL (second tier) and even one season in the 3. SNL (third tier), before being promoted back to the top level in 2005 after finishing second in the 2004–05 Slovenian Second League.

After the 2011–12 Slovenian PrvaLiga season, Nafta was relegated from the top tier and was dissolved due to bankruptcy. In the same year, the club was refounded as ND Lendava 1903.

== Domestic league and cup results ==
Season	League	Position	Pts	P	W	D	L	GF	GA	Cup
1991–92	1. SNL	15	36	40	13	10	17	52	63	Semi-finals
1992–93	1. SNL	18	19	34	6	7	21	30	64	Round of 16
1993–94	2. SNL	4	40	30	18	4	8	55	27	First round
1994–95	2. SNL	2	43	30	16	11	3	50	26	did not qualify
1995–96	2. SNL	2	59	29	18	5	6	51	19	First round
1996–97	2. SNL	4	48	29	12	12	5	36	28	Round of 16
1997–98	2. SNL	6	43	30	12	7	11	39	39	First round
1998–99	2. SNL	11	36	30	10	6	14	35	47	Quarter-finals
1999–00	2. SNL	11	34	30	9	7	14	34	49	did not qualify
2000–01	2. SNL	9	37	29	10	7	12	32	31	Round of 16
2001–02	2. SNL	9	39	30	11	6	13	46	52	First round
2002–03	2. SNL	14	30	30	8	6	16	40	61	Quarter-finals
2003–04	3. SNL – East	1	56	26	18	2	6	64	31	Quarter-finals
2004–05	2. SNL	2	70	33	20	10	3	67	28	Semi-finals
2005–06	1. SNL	7	46	36	13	7	16	42	52	Round of 16
2006–07	1. SNL	8	45	36	12	9	15	45	59	Quarter-finals
2007–08	1. SNL	7	47	36	12	11	13	43	56	Quarter-finals
2008–09	1. SNL	7	43	36	11	10	15	36	52	Quarter-finals
2009–10	1. SNL	6	49	36	14	7	15	51	53	Semi-finals
2010–11	1. SNL	9	37	36	10	7	19	47	67	Quarter-finals
2011–12	1. SNL	10	25	36	5	10	21	34	71	Round of 16

*Best results are highlighted.

== Honours ==
League

- Slovenian Republic League
  - Winners: 1946
- Slovenian Third League
  - Winners: 2003–04
