= NK Drava Ptuj (1933) =

Association football club in Slovenia

Drava Ptuj
- Full name: Nogometni klub Drava Ptuj
- Nicknames: Kurenti; Plavi (The Blues)
- Founded: 14 May 1933; 92 years ago
- Dissolved: 2011; 15 years ago
- Ground: Ptuj City Stadium
- Capacity: 2,207
Home colours	Away colours

Nogometni klub Drava Ptuj (English: Drava Ptuj Football Club), commonly referred to as NK Drava Ptuj or simply Drava, was a Slovenian football club, which played in the town of Ptuj. Named after the Drava river which flows through the town, Drava Ptuj has spent a total of seven season in the Slovenian PrvaLiga, the top division of the Slovenian football pyramid. The club was dissolved following the 2010–11 Slovenian Second League when they were unable to obtain competition licences issued by the Football Association of Slovenia.

In 2004, NŠ Drava Ptuj was founded, which was to be responsible for the club's youth selections. However, the records and honours of the two clubs are kept separate by the Football Association of Slovenia.

== Domestic league and cup results ==
Season	League	Position	Pts	P	W	D	L	GF	GA	Cup
1991–92	1. Class (level 3)	3	30(−1)	22	14	3	5	65	20	Round of 64
1992–93	1. Class (level 4)	1	41	22	19	3	0	98	17	First round
1993–94	3. SNL East	1	39	26	16	7	3	68	22	First round
1994–95	2. SNL	6	32	30	13	7	10	48	40	did not qualify
1995–96	2. SNL	14	31	29	8	7	14	32	53	First round
1996–97	2. SNL	2	56	29	16	8	5	49	19	Round of 16
1997–98	2. SNL	7	39	30	10	9	11	32	32	First round
1998–99	2. SNL	7	48	30	13	9	8	48	36	First round
1999–2000	2. SNL	13	29	30	7	8	15	34	47	First round
2000–01	3. SNL North	1	68	26	22	2	2	65	19	did not qualify
2001–02	2. SNL	5	51	30	15	6	9	57	36	did not qualify
2002–03	2. SNL	2	61	30	18	7	5	63	24	did not qualify
2003–04	1. SNL	11	28	32	7	7	18	34	60	Round of 16
2004–05	1. SNL	5	46	32	12	10	10	40	36	Second round
2005–06	1. SNL	5	54	36	15	9	12	50	46	Round of 16
2006–07	1. SNL	4	55	36	15	10	11	61	52	Round of 16
2007–08	1. SNL	9	44	36	13	5	18	45	64	Round of 16
2008–09	1. SNL	9	42	36	12	6	18	47	53	Round of 16
2009–10	1. SNL	10	30	36	7	9	20	34	56	Round of 16
2010–11	2. SNL	5	39	27	11	6	10	38	41	First round

== Honours ==
- Slovenian Second League
  - Runners-up (2): 1996–97, 2002–03
- Slovenian Third League
  - Winners (2): 1993–94, 2000–01
- Slovenian Fourth Division
  - Winners (1): 1992–93
- MNZ Ptuj Cup
  - Winners (4): 1992–93, 1995–96, 1997–98, 1998–99
  - Runners-up (4): 1993, 1994–95, 2002–03, 2010–11

== UEFA competitions ==
Drava goals always listed first.

Season	Competition	Round	Club	Home	Away	Aggregate
2005	UEFA Intertoto Cup	First round	(Croatia) Slaven Belupo	0–1	0–1	0–2
