= NK Kovinar Maribor =

Kovinar Maribor
- Full name: Nogometni klub Kovinar Maribor
- Founded: 25 May 1947; 78 years ago
- Dissolved: June 2006; 19 years ago
- Ground: Kovinar Stadium
Home colours	Away colours

Nogometni klub Kovinar Maribor (English: Kovinar Maribor Football Club), commonly referred to as NK Kovinar Maribor or simply Kovinar, was a Slovenian football club from Maribor. The club was dissolved in 2006.

== History ==
Kovinar Maribor was founded on 25 May 1947 and was located in the Tezno District of Maribor. During the booming economy in Maribor after the World War II, the club was financially supported by the local engineering industry company Metalna Maribor and the vehicle manufacturer TAM, both based in Tezno. Between the end of World War II in 1945 and the independence of Slovenia in 1991, Kovinar spent a total of 18 years in the Slovenian Republic Football League.

In 1961, they helped the newly formed NK Maribor by giving them some players and sports equipment. After the bribery scandal, when NK Maribor was relegated to the third Yugoslav division and many foreign players left the club, Kovinar again helped them by providing footballers. Unlike other major clubs based in the city, namely NK Maribor and Železničar Maribor, Kovinar never played in the Slovenian first division after Slovenia's independence; the highest level they reached was the second division during the 1991–92 season. The club was dissolved in June 2006 due to financial problems. In August 2006, a new phoenix club, named NK Tezno Maribor, was founded.

Zlatko Zahovič, who is considered one of the best Slovenian footballers of all time, was a member of the club's youth selections in the late 1980s, before joining Partizan from Belgrade.

== Stadium ==
Kovinar Maribor played their home matches at Kovinar Stadium. The stadium can seat 200 spectators, while the overall capacity is around 1,000 (including standing areas).

The stadium was once a significant venue for motorcycle speedway and hosted many important events, organised by the AMD TAM Maribor. These included qualifying rounds of the Speedway World Team Cup in 1969, 1971 and 1973, the Speedway World Pairs Championship semi-finals in 1970 and 1975, and the Speedway World Championship qualifiers in 1967 and 1972.
