= NK Svoboda Ljubljana =

Slovenian football club

Svoboda Ljubljana
- Full name: Nogometni klub Svoboda Ljubljana
- Nickname: Vitezi (The Knights)
- Founded: 1952; 74 years ago
- Ground: Svoboda Sports Park
- Capacity: 500
- President: Luka Majtan
- Head coach: Milan Petrović
- League: 3. SNL – West
- 2025–26: 3. SNL – West, 12th of 14
- Website: www.nksvoboda.si
| Home colours | Away colours |

NK Svoboda Ljubljana (Nogometni klub Svoboda Ljubljana, 'Svoboda Ljubljana Football Club'), commonly referred to as simply Svoboda, is a Slovenian football club from Ljubljana which plays in the Slovenian Third League.

== History ==
The club was founded as ŠD Svoboda in 1952. In the late 1950s, they merged with NK Grafičar, took over its place in the Slovenian Republic League and played under this name until 1962. The most successful period for the club was in the 1970s, when they played in the Yugoslav Second League under the sponsorship of Mercator. In 1971, they won the Slovenian Republic League for the first time and earned promotion to the Yugoslav Second League – West.

| Year | Postiton | Year | Postiton |
|---|---|---|---|
| 1971 | 1st | 1977 | 17th |
| 1972 | 13th | 1978 | 1st |
| 1973 | 8th | 1979 | 16th |
| 1974 | 18th | 1980 | 1st |
| 1975 | 1st | 1981 | 8th |
| 1976 | 12th | 1982 | 16th |

During this period, they also won two Republic Cup titles, in 1976 and 1978. Thus, Svoboda participated in the Yugoslav Cup and in the 1978–79 season reached the round of 16, where they were eliminated by Borac Banja Luka.

After Slovenia's independence in 1991, Svoboda played in the Slovenian PrvaLiga for three seasons, finishing in 11th, 6th, and 13th place. In 1994 the club was replaced by Slavija with many players leaving from them to Vevče. Svoboda then played several seasons in lower divisions, before returning to the scene in 2003, when they were promoted to the Slovenian Second League. They have played there for three seasons, scoring the best result in the 2004–05 season with third place, which was not enough to secure promotion, due to Slovenian First League being decreased to ten teams. In the next two seasons Svoboda was relegated from the second and third division, having serious financial troubles. The club was taken over by NK Interblock in 2008 to become their feeder team for youth selections, but this cooperation lasted only one season, after which Svoboda started independently again in 2009. In 2018, Svoboda returned to the third division after winning the promotion play-offs against Žiri.

== Honours ==
League

- Slovenian Republic League
  - Winners: 1970–71, 1974–75, 1977–78, 1979–80
- Slovenian Third League
  - Winners: 2002–03
- Ljubljana Regional League (fourth tier)
  - Winners: 2010–11, 2017–18
- Slovenian Fifth Division
  - Winners: 1994–95, 2009–10

Cup

- Slovenian Republic Cup
  - Winners: 1975–76, 1977–78
- MNZ Ljubljana Cup
  - Winners: 2003–04

== Domestic league and cup results ==
| Season | League | Position | Pts | P | W | D | L | GF | GA | Cup |
|---|---|---|---|---|---|---|---|---|---|---|
| 1991–92 | 1. SNL | 11 | 40 | 40 | 14 | 12 | 14 | 51 | 55 | Round of 64 |
| 1992–93 | 1. SNL | 6 | 38 | 34 | 14 | 10 | 10 | 38 | 33 | Quarter-finals |
| 1993–94 | 1. SNL | 13 | 23 | 30 | 9 | 5 | 16 | 31 | 59 | First round |
| 1994–95 | 2. MNZ LJ | 1 | 28 | 18 | 13 | 2 | 3 | 43 | 20 | First round |
| 1995–96 | 1. MNZ LJ | 3 | 48 | 26 | 15 | 3 | 8 | 48 | 33 | did not qualify |
| 1996–97 | 1. MNZ LJ | 3 | 45 | 25 | 14 | 3 | 8 | 54 | 33 | did not qualify |
| 1997–98 | 3. SNL – West | 2 | 42 | 25 | 11 | 9 | 5 | 41 | 21 | did not qualify |
| 1998–99 | 3. SNL – Centre | 3 | 47 | 26 | 14 | 5 | 7 | 78 | 50 | did not qualify |
| 1999–2000 | 3. SNL – Centre | 11 | 26 | 26 | 6 | 8 | 12 | 34 | 39 | did not qualify |
| 2000–01 | 3. SNL – Centre | 9 | 33 | 26 | 8 | 9 | 9 | 32 | 34 | did not qualify |
| 2001–02 | 3. SNL – Centre | 3 | 47 | 26 | 13 | 8 | 5 | 45 | 32 | did not qualify |
| 2002–03 | 3. SNL – Centre | 1 | 62 | 25 | 19 | 5 | 1 | 76 | 23 | did not qualify |
| 2003–04 | 2. SNL | 8 | 34 | 32 | 9 | 7 | 16 | 48 | 47 | did not qualify |
| 2004–05 | 2. SNL | 3 | 61 | 33 | 18 | 7 | 8 | 52 | 33 | First round |
| 2005–06 | 2. SNL | 9 | 25 | 27 | 7 | 4 | 16 | 26 | 33 | First round |
| 2006–07 | 3. SNL – West | 11 | 29 | 26 | 9 | 15 | 2 | 39 | 59 | did not qualify |
| 2007–08 | 2. MNZ LJ | 8 | 21 | 20 | 7 | 0 | 13 | 40 | 50 | did not qualify |
| 2008–09 | did not enter any competitions | | | | | | | | | |
| 2009–10 | 2. MNZ LJ | 1 | 38 | 16 | 12 | 2 | 2 | 71 | 22 | did not qualify |
| 2010–11 | Regional | 1 | 56 | 26 | 17 | 5 | 4 | 60 | 27 | did not qualify |
| 2011–12 | 3. SNL – West | 14 | 22 | 26 | 5 | 7 | 14 | 23 | 49 | did not qualify |
| 2012–13 | Regional | 2 | 55 | 26 | 17 | 4 | 5 | 64 | 31 | did not qualify |
| 2013–14 | Regional | 8 | 32 | 26 | 9 | 5 | 12 | 44 | 50 | did not qualify |
| 2014–15 | Regional | 6 | 28 | 19 | 9 | 1 | 9 | 33 | 31 | did not qualify |
| 2015–16 | Regional | 2 | 44 | 22 | 14 | 2 | 6 | 52 | 34 | did not qualify |
| 2016–17 | Regional | 4 | 40 | 22 | 12 | 4 | 6 | 42 | 31 | did not qualify |
| 2017–18 | Regional | 1 | 58 | 22 | 18 | 4 | 0 | 65 | 18 | did not qualify |
| 2018–19 | 3. SNL – Centre | 6 | 32 | 27 | 7 | 11 | 9 | 44 | 52 | did not qualify |
| 2019–20 | 3. SNL – West (Note: The season was not completed due to the COVID-19 pandemic.) | 2 | 31 | 14 | 9 | 4 | 1 | 47 | 19 | did not qualify |
| 2020–21 | 3. SNL – West | 7 | 22 | 19 | 7 | 1 | 11 | 33 | 47 | did not qualify |
| 2021–22 | 3. SNL – West | 13 | 16 | 26 | 4 | 4 | 18 | 20 | 55 | did not qualify |
| 2022–23 | 3. SNL – West | 6 | 39 | 26 | 11 | 6 | 9 | 32 | 30 | First round |
| 2023–24 | 3. SNL – West | 7 | 35 | 26 | 11 | 2 | 13 | 52 | 54 | Preliminary round |
| 2024–25 | 3. SNL – West | 8 | 40 | 26 | 12 | 4 | 10 | 56 | 36 | First round |
| 2025–26 | 3. SNL – West | 12 | 23 | 26 | 6 | 5 | 15 | 30 | 51 | First round |

Notes

*Best results are highlighted.
