= NK Jesenice =

Slovenian football club

Jesenice
- Full name: Nogometni klub Jesenice
- Nickname: Železarji (The Ironworkers)
- Founded: 1912; 114 years ago
- Ground: Podmežakla Sports Park
- President: Asmir Jusufagić
- League: Slovenian Second League
- 2025–26: Slovenian Second League, 16th of 16
- Website: nkjesenice.si
Home colours	Away colours

Nogometni klub Jesenice (English: Jesenice Football Club), commonly referred to as NK Jesenice or simply Jesenice, is a Slovenian football club from Jesenice that competes in the Slovenian Second League, the second highest league in Slovenia. The club got its present name in 1953 after the merger of NK Gregorčič and NK Bratstvo.

== Honours ==
- Slovenian Fourth Division

Winners: 1993–94, 2002–03, 2010–11, 2022–23

- Slovenian Fifth Division

Winners: 2001–02, 2008–09
