= NK Naklo =

Slovenian football club

Naklo
- Full name: Nogometni klub Naklo
- Founded: 1936; 89 years ago (as Športni klub Slovan); 2010; 15 years ago (refounded)
- Ground: Podbrezje Field
- President: Boštjan Slak
- Website: sd-naklo.si

Nogometni klub Naklo (English: Naklo Football Club), commonly referred to as NK Naklo or simply Naklo, is a Slovenian football club from Naklo. The club played a total of four seasons in the Slovenian PrvaLiga, the country's highest division, in the 1990s, before folding in 2010 after failing to obtain competition licences issued by the Football Association of Slovenia. It was refounded in the same year.

== Name changes ==
Club names through history:

- Športni klub Slovan (1936–1946)
- Fizkulturno društvo Naklo (1946–1952)
- TVD Partizan Naklo (1952–1990)
- NK Živila Naklo (1990–1995)
- NK Naklo (1995–present)

== Honours ==
- Upper Carniolan League (fourth tier)

Winners: 2009–10
