= NK Triglav Kranj =

Triglav Kranj
- Full name: Nogometni klub Triglav Kranj
- Nicknames: Orli (The Eagles); Bordo-beli (The Burgundy-Whites)
- Founded: 1920; 106 years ago (as SK Korotan); 1997; 29 years ago (refounded)
- Ground: Stanko Mlakar Stadium
- Capacity: 2,060
- President: Aleksander Vrtač
- Head coach: Dejan Djuranović
- League: Slovenian Second League
- 2025–26: Slovenian Second League, 3rd of 16
- Website: www.nktriglav.si
Home colours	Away colours

Nogometni klub Triglav Kranj (English: Triglav Kranj Football Club), commonly referred to as NK Triglav Kranj or simply Triglav, is a Slovenian football club from Kranj that competes in the Slovenian Second League, the second highest league in Slovenia. The club was founded in 1920. In the mid-1990s, they merged with NK Naklo and were re-established under the current name Triglav Kranj.

== Name changes ==
- 1920: Founded as SK Korotan
- 1937: Renamed as SK Kranj
- 1945: Renamed as Storžič
- 1947: Renamed as Udarnik
- 1949: Renamed as Korotan
- 1955: Renamed as Triglav
- 1994: Renamed as Triglav Creina
- 1997: Re-established as Triglav Kranj

== Honours ==
League

- Slovenian Republic League
  - Winners: 1950, 1951
- Slovenian Second League
  - Winners: 1997–98, 2000–01, 2016–17

Cup

- Slovenian Republic Cup
  - Winners: 1983–84
- MNZG Kranj Cup
  - Winners: 1991–92, 1996–97, 1999–2000, 2000–01, 2003–04, 2006–07, 2008–09, 2009–10, 2014–15, 2015–16, 2016–17

== League history ==
Season	League	Position
1991–92	2. SNL	2nd
1992–93	2. SNL	5th
1993–94	2. SNL	15th
1994–95	3. SNL – West	4th
1995–96	3. SNL – West	3rd
1996–97; 1996–97	2. SNL; 3. SNL – West (Note: Triglav started the season in the Slovenian Third League. During the winter break, Triglav merged with NK Naklo, who was a member of the Slovenian Second League. In the second half of the season, a team named Triglav Naklo competed in the Second League, while a team named Naklo Triglav competed in the Third League. In the next season, Triglav Kranj took Triglav Naklo's place in the Second League, while Naklo Triglav played in the Third League.)	11th 8th
1997–98	2. SNL	1st
1998–99	1. SNL	12th
1999–2000	2. SNL	9th
2000–01	2. SNL	1st
2001–02	1. SNL	11th
2002–03	2. SNL	8th
2003–04	2. SNL	9th
2004–05	2. SNL	8th
2005–06	2. SNL	3rd
2006–07	2. SNL	4th
2007–08	2. SNL	9th
2008–09	2. SNL	3rd

Season	League	Position
2009–10	2. SNL	2nd (Note: Won in promotion/relegation play-offs.)
2010–11	1. SNL	7th
2011–12	1. SNL	9th
2012–13	1. SNL	8th
2013–14	1. SNL	10th
2014–15	2. SNL	6th
2015–16	2. SNL	4th
2016–17	2. SNL	1st
2017–18	1. SNL	9th
2018–19	1. SNL	8th
2019–20	1. SNL	9th (Note: Lost in promotion/relegation play-offs.)
2020–21	2. SNL	7th
2021–22	2. SNL	2nd
2022–23	2. SNL	12th
2023–24	2. SNL	6th
2024–25	2. SNL	2nd
2025–26	2. SNL	3rd
