= NK Zagorje =

Slovenian football club

Zagorje
- Full name: Nogometni klub Zagorje
- Nickname: Proletarci (The Proletarians)
- Founded: 1923; 103 years ago
- Ground: Zagorje City Stadium
- Capacity: 1,080
- President: Adil Macanović
- Head coach: Nejc Vozelj
- League: Ljubljana Regional League
- 2025–26: Ljubljana Regional League, 3rd of 13
- Website: nkzagorje.si
Home colours	Away colours

Nogometni klub Zagorje (English: Zagorje Football Club), commonly referred to as NK Zagorje or simply Zagorje, is a Slovenian football club based in the town of Zagorje ob Savi that competes in the Ljubljana Regional League, the fourth highest league in Slovenia. The club was founded in 1923. Zagorje have a long-standing local rivalry with NK Rudar Trbovlje, which is known as the Zasavje Derby.
