= NK Mura =

Mura
- Full name: Nogometni klub Mura Murska Sobota
- Nickname(s): Črno-beli (The Black and Whites)
- Founded: 16 August 1924; 100 years ago
- Dissolved: 2005; 20 years ago
- Ground: Fazanerija
- Capacity: 3,782
Home colours	Away colours

Nogometni klub Mura (English: Mura Football Club), commonly referred to as NK Mura or simply Mura, was a Slovenian association football club based in Murska Sobota. The club was founded on 16 August 1924 as one of the first clubs in the Prekmurje region. The club had its golden years in the 1990s when they won the Slovenian Football Cup. During this period they were also the runners-up of the Slovenian PrvaLiga on two occasions. They played their home matches at Fazanerija City Stadium.

NK Mura was dissolved during the 2004–05 season after the club failed to obtain competition licences issued by the Football Association of Slovenia. The club was allowed to finish the 2004–05 season, which was already in progress, and after finishing eighth in the national championship, Mura effectively ceased all operations.

== History ==
NK Mura was founded in Murska Sobota on 16 August 1924 in the congress hall of the Hotel Dobrai, and Franjo Košir was appointed as the first president. Their first match was played on 31 August 1924 at home against SK Maribor, which was won by the visiting team 6–0. They played one more match in 1924, against SK Merkur from Maribor, which ended with another loss for Mura (5–1).

The best period in the club's history was after 1991, when Slovenia gained independence from Yugoslavia. Mura finished as runners-up of the Slovenian top division twice, in 1993–94 and 1997–98. In May 1995, the club won its first major trophy after winning the 1994–95 Slovenian Cup with a 2–1 aggregate victory over Celje. With this title, Mura secured an invitation to play in the newly established Slovenian Supercup at the start of the next season. The match was played in Ljubljana and was won by Olimpija 2–1.

Mura had a string of mixed results for the remainder of their final seasons, despite acquiring highly regarded coaches such as Miroslav Blažević. The club became financially unstable; in their last season, the club had struggled on the pitch and failed to obtain competition licences issued by the Football Association of Slovenia, which led to its dissolution in 2005. The club finished the last competitive season (2004–05) in eight place out of twelve teams. A successor club was established in 2005 under the name ND Mura 05; however, they are legally not considered to be the same club and their records and honours are kept separate by the Football Association of Slovenia. Mura 05 was later disbanded in 2013.

== Honours ==
League

- Slovenian Republic League
  - Winners: 1969–70
- Slovenian PrvaLiga
  - Runners-up: 1993–94, 1997–98

Cup

- Slovenian Republic Cup
  - Winners: 1951, 1974–75
  - Runners-up: 1972–73
- Slovenian Cup
  - Winners: 1994–95
  - Runners-up: 1993–94
- Slovenian Supercup
  - Runners-up: 1995

== League history since 1991 ==
Season	League	Position	Notes
1991–92	1. SNL	7th	/
1992–93	1. SNL	3rd	/
1993–94	1. SNL	2nd	Qualified for UEFA Cup
1994–95	1. SNL	4th	Won Slovenian Cup. Qualified for UEFA Cup Winners' Cup.
1995–96	1. SNL	3rd	Qualified for UEFA Cup
1996–97	1. SNL	7th	/
1997–98	1. SNL	2nd	Qualified for UEFA Cup
1998–99	1. SNL	4th	/
1999–2000	1. SNL	10th	/
2000–01	1. SNL	4th	/
2001–02	1. SNL	7th	/
2002–03	1. SNL	9th	/
2003–04	1. SNL	5th	/
2004–05	1. SNL	8th	Club dissolved during the season but played until the end.

== European record ==
All results (home and away) list Mura's goal tally first.

Season	Competition	Round	Club	Home	Away	Agg.
1994–95	UEFA Cup	PR	(Switzerland) Aarau	0–1	0–1	0–2
1995–96	UEFA Cup Winners' Cup	QR	(Lithuania) Žalgiris	2–1	0–2	2–3
1996–97	UEFA Cup	PR	(Federal Republic of Yugoslavia) Bečej	2–0	0–0	2–0
1996–97	UEFA Cup	QR	(Denmark) Lyngby BK	0–2	0–0	0–2
1998–99	UEFA Cup	1QR	(Latvia) Daugava Riga	6–1	2–1	8–2
1998–99	UEFA Cup	2QR	(Denmark) Silkeborg IF	0–0	0–2	0–2

Notes

- PR: Preliminary round
- QR: Qualifying round
- 1Q: First qualifying round
- 2Q: Second qualifying round
