= ND Slovan =

Slovenian football club

Slovan
- Full name: Nogometno društvo Slovan
- Nicknames: Ponos Kodeljevega (The Pride of Kodeljevo)
- Founded: 1913; 113 years ago
- Ground: Kodeljevo Sports Park
- President: Ivan Simič
- Head coach: Sebastjan Cimirotič
- League: Slovenian Second League
- 2025–26: Slovenian Second League, 11th of 16
- Website: www.nd-slovan.si
Home colours	Away colours

Nogometno društvo Slovan or simply ND Slovan is a Slovenian football club based in Ljubljana that competes in the Slovenian Second League, the second tier of Slovenian football. The team play their home matches at the Kodeljevo Sports Park. The traditional colours of the club are red and white.

== History ==
The club was founded in 1913 and has held its original name since then. They have won the Slovenian Republic League twice, in 1965 and 1983, and participated in the Yugoslav Second League in 1965–66 and 1983–84. Slovan also won the Slovenian Republic Cup in 1982. After 1991, Slovan spent three consecutive seasons in the Slovenian First League and finished 10th, 11th and 15th, respectively. In 1996, they merged with Slavija Vevče and formed ND Slovan-Slavija, which played in the First League under the sponsor name Set Vevče in 1997–98, but was relegated at the end of the season. After another relegation and sponsor withdrawal, Slovan started on their own in the Slovenian Third League in 1999.

== Honours ==
- Slovenian Republic League
  - Winners: 1964–65, 1982–83
- Slovenian Republic Cup
  - Winners: 1981–82
- Slovenian Fourth Division
  - Winners: 2001–02
