= 1997–98 Slovenian Football Cup =

Tournament details
- Country: Slovenia
- Teams: 32

Final positions
- Champions: Rudar Velenje (1st title)
- Runners-up: Primorje

Tournament statistics
- Matches played: 38
- Goals scored: 120 (3.16 per match)
- Top goal scorer: Štefan Škaper (6 goals)

The 1997–98 Slovenian Football Cup was the seventh season of the Slovenian Football Cup, Slovenia's football knockout competition.

== Qualified clubs ==
=== 1996–97 Slovenian PrvaLiga members ===
- Beltinci
- Celje
- Gorica
- Koper
- Korotan Prevalje
- Maribor
- Mura
- Olimpija
- Primorje
- Rudar Velenje

=== Qualified through MNZ Regional Cups ===
- MNZ Ljubljana: Elan, Vevče, Domžale
- MNZ Maribor: Železničar Maribor, Dravograd, Pohorje
- MNZ Celje: Šentjur, Dravinja
- MNZ Koper: Ilirska Bistrica, Branik Šmarje
- MNZ Nova Gorica: Renče, Idrija
- MNZ Murska Sobota: Goričanka, Bakovci, Serdica
- MNZ Lendava: Nafta Lendava, Turnišče
- MNZG-Kranj: Triglav Kranj, Lesce
- MNZ Ptuj: Drava Ptuj, Aluminij, Dornava

== First round ==
The first round matches took place between 26 July and 10 August 1997.

26 July 1997	Nafta	0–1	Korotan Prevalje	Lendava
		Report	Vidovič 85'	Stadium: NK Nafta Stadium; Attendance: 250; Referee: Andrej Kokolj

26 July 1997	Pohorje	0–2	Gorica	Ruše
		Report	Osterc 77'; Demirović 88' (pen.)	Stadium: NK Pohorje Stadium; Attendance: 500; Referee: Radenko Mijatović

27 July 1997	Domžale	0–2	Beltinci	Domžale
		Report	Godina 42'; Dzafič 89'	Stadium: Domžale Sports Park; Attendance: 300; Referee: Niko Vivod

27 July 1997	Bakovci	0–2	Maribor	Bakovci
		Report	Kek 18' (pen.); Šarkezi 44'	Stadium: ŠRC Bakovci; Attendance: 300; Referee: Darko Horvat

27 July 1997	Šentjur	1–4	Olimpija	Šentjur
	Kidrič 83'	Report	Ekmečić 17'; Šporar 52'; Agić 60'; Kujović 80'	Stadium: Šentjur Sport Park; Attendance: 400; Referee: Božo Tabar

27 July 1997	Turnišče	0–7	Celje	Turnišče
		Report	Goršek 6', 34', 42'; Kamberović 21', 73', 76'; Sešlar 39' (pen.)	Stadium: Turnišče Stadium; Attendance: 150; Referee: Željko Lackovič

27 July 1997	Aluminij	0–5	Vevče	Kidričevo
		Report	Karapetrović 2'; Struna 9'; Bajrektarevič 20'; Šalja 33'; Poglajen 63'	Stadium: Aluminij Sports Park; Attendance: 300; Referee: Peter Šart

27 July 1997	Drava Ptuj	0–0 (a.e.t.) (5–6 p)	Primorje	Ptuj
		Report		Stadium: Ptuj City Stadium; Attendance: 300; Referee: Dževad Salkič
	Penalties
	Karanović (penalty scored); Vesenjak (penalty scored); Hotko (penalty scored); Emeršič (penalty scored); Vršič (penalty scored)		(penalty scored) Stanič; (penalty scored) Ščulac; (penalty scored) Poljšak; (penalty scored) Lučić; (penalty scored) Želko; (penalty scored) Mulahmetović

27 July 1997	Dravinja	0–6	Mura	Slovenske Konjice
		Report	Cirkvenčič 2'; Škaper 41', 70'; Cipot 44'; A. Baranja 51'; Fras 68'	Stadium: ŠRC Dobrava; Attendance: 150; Referee: Josip Jakopiček

27 July 1997	Branik Šmarje	0–3	Rudar Velenje	Koper
		Report	Vidojević 59'; Rad 70'; Gajser 83'	Stadium: Bonifika Stadium; Attendance: 150; Referee: Matjaž Bohinc

10 August 1997	Triglav Kranj	8–0	Serdica	Kranj
	Bogatinov 13', 43', 77', 87'; Radosavljević 36', 78'; Ahčin 45'; Žagar 56'	Report		Stadium: Kranj Sports Centre; Attendance: 300; Referee: Alojz Žerak

10 August 1997	Železničar Maribor	3–0	Idrija	Maribor
	Pipenbaher 59'; Pušnik 83'; Pitamic 86'	Report		Stadium: Tabor Sports Park; Attendance: 100; Referee: Gorazd Kodrič

10 August 1997	Koper	0–1	Dravograd	Koper
		Report	Daljevič 48'	Stadium: Bonifika Stadium; Attendance: 500; Referee: Radenko Mijatović

10 August 1997	Goričanka	4–1	Goriške Opekarne	Sveti Jurij
	Horvat 12'; Šuša 38', 53', 59'	Report	Dončič 80'	Stadium: Igrišče NK Goričanka; Attendance: 200; Referee: Željko Lackovič

10 August 1997	Ilirska Bistrica	0–0 (a.e.t.) (3–5 p)	Lesce	Ilirska Bistrica
		Report		Stadium: Trnovo Sports Centre; Attendance: 100; Referee: Andrej Kokolj
	Penalties
	De Frančeski (penalty scored); Rojc (penalty scored); Varljen (penalty scored)		(penalty scored) Gumzej; (penalty scored) Lajič; (penalty scored) Drobnak; (penalty scored) Matjaž; (penalty scored) Dolanc

10 August 1997	Dornava	0–1	Elan	Dornava
		Report	Zofič 85'	Stadium: Dornava Stadium; Attendance: 300; Referee: Niko Vivod

== Round of 16 ==
The round of 16 matches took place on 24 September 1997.

24 September 1997	Dravograd	1–2	Primorje	Dravograd
	Mehilli 12'	Report	Rudonja 39'; Želko 69'	Stadium: Dravograd Sports Centre; Attendance: 450; Referee: Matjaž Bohinc

24 September 1997	Triglav Kranj	0–1	Rudar Velenje	Kranj
		Report	Rad 22'	Stadium: Kranj Sports Centre; Attendance: 800; Referee: Žarko Vidali

24 September 1997	Železničar Maribor	0–1	Vevče	Maribor
		Report	Gliha 26'	Stadium: Tabor Sports Park; Attendance: 500; Referee: Ivan Žunič

24 September 1997	Elan	1–0	Beltinci	Novo Mesto
	Gruden 67'	Report		Stadium: Portoval; Attendance: 150; Referee: Peter Šart

24 September 1997	Celje	5–4	Gorica	Celje
	Sivko 34', 75'; Goršek 40'; Somália 44', 63'	Report	Djuranović 17'; Komočar 35'; Demirović 47'; Goga 85'	Stadium: Skalna Klet; Attendance: 1,000; Referee: Silvo Borošak

24 September 1997	Goričanka	2–6	Olimpija	Sveti Jurij
	Muller 64'; Šuša 70'	Report	Ačimovič 11', 37' (pen.); Kitić 19'; Valentić 30'; Bloudek 84', 89'	Stadium: Igrišče NK Goričanka; Attendance: 400; Referee: Željko Lackovič

24 September 1997	Lesce	0–6	Mura	Lesce
		Report	Škaper 12', 45', 74'; D. Baranja 14'; Gutalj 65'; Šahmanovič 85'	Stadium: Igrišče na Žagi; Attendance: 300; Referee: Niko Vivod

24 September 1997	Maribor	2–1	Korotan Prevalje	Maribor
	Fricelj 49'; Bulajič 53'	Report	Plesec 90'	Stadium: Ljudski vrt Attendance: 2,000; Referee: Darko Horvat

== Quarter-finals ==
The first legs of the quarter-finals took place on 22 and 29 October, and the second legs took place on 5 and 12 November 1997.

=== First legs ===
22 October 1997	Elan	1–0	Celje	Novo Mesto
	Rodič 63'	Report		Stadium: Portoval; Attendance: 200; Referee: Drago Kos

22 October 1997	Mura	5–0	Maribor	Murska Sobota
	Škaper 9'; Lukič 18'; Cipot 72'; Cirkvenčič 78'; Dominko 86'	Report		Stadium: Fazanerija City Stadium; Attendance: 2,000; Referee: Ivan Žunič

22 October 1997	Rudar Velenje	2–0	Vevče	Velenje
	Breznik 43' (pen.), 57'	Report		Stadium: Ob Jezeru City Stadium; Attendance: 500; Referee: Žarko Vidali

29 October 1997	Primorje	1–0	Olimpija	Ajdovščina
	Gunjač 16'	Report		Stadium: Ajdovščina City Stadium; Attendance: 600; Referee: Matjaž Bohinc

=== Second legs ===
5 November 1997	Celje	0–0 (0–1 agg.)	Elan	Celje
		Report		Stadium: Skalna Klet; Attendance: 250; Referee: Ivan Žunič

5 November 1997	Maribor	1–0 (1–5 agg.)	Mura	Maribor
	Siljanoski 63'	Report		Stadium: Ljudski vrt Attendance: 1,500; Referee: Milan Mitrovič

5 November 1997	Vevče	0–3 (0–5 agg.)	Rudar Velenje	Vevče
		Report	Gajser 25', 66'; Vidojević 64'	Stadium: Slavija Stadium; Attendance: 200; Referee: Štefan Tivold

12 November 1997	Olimpija	2–1 (2–2a agg.)	Primorje	Ljubljana
	Šporar 17'; Kitić 70'	Report	Mulahmetović 43'	Stadium: Bežigrad Stadium; Attendance: 700; Referee: Zoran Novarlić

== Semi-finals ==
The first legs of the semi-finals took place on 8 April, and the second legs took place on 29 April 1998.

=== First legs ===
8 April 1998	Elan	2–2	Primorje	Novo Mesto
	Rodič 43'; Gruden 80' (pen.)	Report	Lučić 47'; Ipavec 90+2' (pen.)	Stadium: Portoval; Attendance: 1,000; Referee: Andrej Kokolj

8 April 1998	Mura	0–1	Rudar Velenje	Murska Sobota
		Report	Pavlović 48'	Stadium: Fazanerija City Stadium; Attendance: 1,500; Referee: Radenko Mijatović

=== Second legs ===
29 April 1998	Rudar Velenje	3–2 (4–2 agg.)	Mura	Velenje
	Javornik 23'; Kosič 81' (pen.); Pavlović 84'	Report	D. Baranja 47'; Ristić 77'	Stadium: Ob Jezeru City Stadium; Attendance: 1,000; Referee: Srečko Kandare

29 April 1998	Primorje	5–0 (7–2 agg.)	Elan	Ajdovščina
	Ipavec 6'; Lučić 47', 72'; Žlogar 71'; Valentinčič 90'	Report		Stadium: Ajdovščina City Stadium; Attendance: 1,000; Referee: Niko Vivod

== Final ==
=== First leg ===
27 May 1998
16:00 CEST

Primorje	2–1	Rudar Velenje
Ipavec 7'; Lučić 9'	Report	Pavlović 76'

Ajdovščina Stadium, Ajdovščina
Attendance: 1,000
Referee: Ivan Žunič

=== Second leg ===
9 June 1998
16:00 CEST

Rudar Velenje	3–0	Primorje
Vidojević 5', 56'; Purg 90+3'	Report

Ob Jezeru, Velenje
Attendance: 2,000
Referee: Milan Mitrovič

Rudar Velenje won 4–2 on aggregate.
