= 1999–2000 UEFA Cup first round =

International football competition

The first round of the 1999–2000 UEFA Cup was played from 14 to 30 September 1999. The round included 38 winners from the qualifying round, 16 losing teams from the Champions League third qualifying round, 3 winners of the Intertoto Cup and 39 new entrants. This narrowed the clubs from 96, down to 48 teams in preparation for the second round.

== Teams ==
The following 96 teams participated in the first round.

Key to colours
Winners of first round advanced to second round

First round participants

Team	Notes	Coeff.
(Italy) Parma		87.606
(Italy) Juventus		121.606
(Netherlands) Ajax		91.908
(Spain) Atlético Madrid		67.814
(France) Monaco		63.721
(Italy) Roma		56.606
(France) Lyon		49.721
(Portugal) Benfica		49.358
(France) Nantes		47.721
(Italy) Bologna		44.606
(Russia) Lokomotiv Moscow		43.912
(Spain) Deportivo La Coruña		43.814
(Germany) 1. FC Kaiserslautern		43.749
(Czech Republic) Slavia Prague		42.812
(Greece) Panathinaikos		41.475
(Belgium) Club Brugge		40.800
(England) Newcastle United		39.144
(Spain) Mallorca		38.814
(Denmark) Brøndby		38.525
(Greece) AEK Athens		38.475
(Spain) Celta Vigo		36.814
(France) Lens		36.721
(Germany) Werder Bremen		35.749
(Austria) Rapid Wien		35.187

Team	Notes	Coeff.
(Italy) Udinese		33.606
(Netherlands) Roda JC		31.908
(Romania) Steaua București		31.100
(Portugal) Sporting CP		30.358
(Switzerland) Grasshopper		30.000
(Sweden) IFK Göteborg		29.662
(Belgium) Anderlecht		26.800
(Netherlands) Vitesse		25.908
(Hungary) Ferencváros		23.833
(Germany) VfL Wolfsburg		22.749
(England) Leeds United		22.144
(France) Montpellier		21.721
(Poland) Legia Warsaw		20.625
(Croatia) Hajduk Split		20.187
(Scotland) Celtic		19.312
(Austria) GAK		19.187
(Turkey) Fenerbahçe		19.175
(Switzerland) Zürich		18.000
(Greece) PAOK		17.475
(England) Tottenham Hotspur		17.144
(England) West Ham United		17.144
(Poland) Widzew Łódź		16.625
(Sweden) Helsingborgs IF		15.662
(Greece) Aris		15.475

Team	Notes	Coeff.
(Denmark) AaB		14.525
(Ukraine) Shakhtar Donetsk		14.145
(Russia) Zenit Saint Petersburg		13.912
(Greece) Ionikos		13.475
(Hungary) MTK Hungária		12.833
(Czech Republic) Sigma Olomouc		12.812
(Portugal) Beira-Mar		12.358
(Portugal) Vitória de Setúbal		12.358
(Switzerland) Servette		12.000
(Switzerland) Lausanne-Sports		12.000
(Norway) Bodø/Glimt		11.866
(Czech Republic) Teplice		11.812
(Belgium) Lierse		11.800
(Denmark) Lyngby		11.525
(Austria) LASK		11.187
(Norway) Viking		10.866
(Denmark) AB		10.525
(Finland) HJK		10.520
(Slovenia) Olimpija Ljubljana		10.415
(Croatia) Osijek		10.187
(Turkey) Ankaragücü		10.175
(Ukraine) Kryvbas Kryvyi Rih		10.145
(Ukraine) Karpaty Lviv		10.145
(Federal Republic of Yugoslavia) Red Star Belgrade		10.124

Team	Notes	Coeff.
(Norway) Stabæk		9.866
(Cyprus) Anorthosis Famagusta		9.332
(Scotland) Kilmarnock		9.312
(Slovakia) Spartak Trnava		9.166
(Romania) Dinamo București		9.100
(Poland) Lech Poznań		8.625
(Poland) Amica Wronki		8.625
(Scotland) St Johnstone		8.312
(Hungary) Debrecen		7.833
(Israel) Maccabi Tel Aviv		7.770
(Slovakia) Inter Slovnaft Bratislava		7.166
(Slovakia) Dukla Banská Bystrica		7.166
(Federal Republic of Yugoslavia) Partizan		7.124
(Cyprus) Omonia		6.332
(Latvia) Skonto		6.291
(Moldova) Zimbru Chișinău		6.166
(Georgia (country)) Torpedo Kutaisi		6.083
(Georgia (country)) Locomotive Tbilisi		6.083
(Bulgaria) CSKA Sofia		5.791
(Israel) Hapoel Tel Aviv		5.770
(Israel) Hapoel Haifa		5.770
(Slovenia) HIT Gorica		5.415
(Federal Republic of Yugoslavia) Vojvodina		4.124
(Bulgaria) Levski Sofia		3.791

Notes

1. ^{TH} UEFA Cup title holders
2. ^{QR} Winners from the qualifying round
3. ^{CL} Losers from the Champions League third qualifying round
4. ^{IC} Teams qualified via the Intertoto Cup

== Seeding ==
The seeding groups were as follows:

Group 1		Group 2		Group 3		Group 4	
Seeded	Unseeded	Seeded	Unseeded	Seeded	Unseeded	Seeded	Unseeded
(Italy) Juventus; (Austria) Rapid Wien; (France) Montpellier; (Greece) Aris	(Switzerland) Servette; (Federal Republic of Yugoslavia) Red Star Belgrade; (Slovakia) Inter Slovnaft Bratislava; (Cyprus) Omonia	(Netherlands) Ajax; (Germany) Werder Bremen; (England) Leeds United; (Sweden) Helsingborgs IF	(Norway) Bodø/Glimt; (Ukraine) Karpaty Lviv; (Slovakia) Dukla Banská Bystrica; (Federal Republic of Yugoslavia) Partizan	(Italy) Parma; (Spain) Celta Vigo; (Germany) VfL Wolfsburg; (Poland) Widzew Łódź	(Switzerland) Lausanne-Sports; (Ukraine) Kryvbas Kryvyi Rih; (Hungary) Debrecen; (Latvia) Skonto	(Spain) Atlético Madrid; (France) Lens; (Hungary) Ferencváros; (England) Tottenham Hotspur	(Czech Republic) Teplice; (Turkey) Ankaragücü; (Israel) Maccabi Tel Aviv; (Moldova) Zimbru Chișinău
Group 5		Group 6		Group 7		Group 8	
Seeded	Unseeded	Seeded	Unseeded	Seeded	Unseeded	Seeded	Unseeded
(France) Monaco; (Greece) AEK Athens; (Netherlands) Vitesse; (England) West Ham United	(Portugal) Beira-Mar; (Croatia) Osijek; (Scotland) St Johnstone; (Georgia (country)) Torpedo Kutaisi	(Italy) Roma; (Denmark) Brøndby; (Belgium) Anderlecht; (Greece) PAOK	(Portugal) Vitória de Setúbal; (Slovenia) Olimpija Ljubljana; (Poland) Amica Wronki; (Georgia (country)) Locomotive Tbilisi	(France) Lyon; (Spain) Mallorca; (Sweden) IFK Göteborg; (Scotland) Celtic	(Czech Republic) Sigma Olomouc; (Finland) HJK; (Poland) Lech Poznań; (Israel) Hapoel Tel Aviv	(Portugal) Benfica; (England) Newcastle United; (Switzerland) Grasshopper; (Turkey) Fenerbahçe	(Hungary) MTK Hungária; (Denmark) AB; (Romania) Dinamo București; (Bulgaria) CSKA Sofia
Group 9		Group 10		Group 11		Group 12	
Seeded	Unseeded	Seeded	Unseeded	Seeded	Unseeded	Seeded	Unseeded
(France) Nantes; (Belgium) Club Brugge; (Portugal) Sporting CP; (Austria) GAK	(Greece) Ionikos; (Norway) Viking; (Slovakia) Spartak Trnava; (Israel) Hapoel Haifa	(Italy) Bologna; (Greece) Panathinaikos; (Romania) Steaua București; (Poland) Legia Warsaw	(Russia) Zenit Saint Petersburg; (Austria) LASK; (Cyprus) Anorthosis Famagusta; (Slovenia) HIT Gorica	(Russia) Lokomotiv Moscow; (Germany) 1. FC Kaiserslautern; (Netherlands) Roda JC; (Croatia) Hajduk Split	(Ukraine) Shakhtar Donetsk; (Denmark) Lyngby; (Scotland) Kilmarnock; (Bulgaria) Levski Sofia	(Spain) Deportivo La Coruña; (Czech Republic) Slavia Prague; (Italy) Udinese; (Switzerland) Zürich	(Denmark) AaB; (Belgium) Lierse; (Norway) Stabæk; (Federal Republic of Yugoslavia) Vojvodina

== Summary ==
Team 1	Agg.	Team 2	1st leg	2nd leg
Steaua București (Romania)	5–2	(Austria) LASK	2–0	3–2
VfL Wolfsburg (Germany)	3–2	(Hungary) Debrecen	2–0	1–2
Red Star Belgrade (Federal Republic of Yugoslavia)	2–3	(France) Montpellier	0–1	2–2
Udinese (Italy)	3–1	(Denmark) AaB	1–0	2–1
Stabæk (Norway)	1–2	(Spain) Deportivo La Coruña	1–0	0–2
Partizan (Federal Republic of Yugoslavia)	1–4	(England) Leeds United	1–3	0–1
HJK (Finland)	1–6	(France) Lyon	0–1	1–5
Atlético Madrid (Spain)	3–1	(Turkey) Ankaragücü	3–0	0–1
MTK Hungária (Hungary)	2–0	(Turkey) Fenerbahçe	0–0	2–0
Anderlecht (Belgium)	6–1	(Slovenia) Olimpija Ljubljana	3–1	3–0
Roda JC (Netherlands)	5–1	(Ukraine) Shakhtar Donetsk	2–0	3–1
Bodø/Glimt (Norway)	1–6	(Germany) Werder Bremen	0–5	1–1
Viking (Norway)	3–1	(Portugal) Sporting CP	3–0	0–1
Maccabi Tel Aviv (Israel)	3–4	(France) Lens	2–2	1–2
1. FC Kaiserslautern (Germany)	5–0	(Scotland) Kilmarnock	3–0	2–0
Helsingborgs IF (Sweden)	2–2 (4–2 p)	(Ukraine) Karpaty Lviv	1–1	1–1 (a.e.t.)
Lech Poznań (Poland)	1–2	(Sweden) IFK Göteborg	1–2	0–0
Teplice (Czech Republic)	4–2	(Hungary) Ferencváros	3–1	1–1
CSKA Sofia (Bulgaria)	2–4	(England) Newcastle United	0–2	2–2
HIT Gorica (Slovenia)	0–3	(Greece) Panathinaikos	0–1	0–2
Amica Wronki (Poland)	5–4	(Denmark) Brøndby	2–0	3–4
Beira-Mar (Portugal)	1–2	(Netherlands) Vitesse	1–2	0–0
GAK (Austria)	4–2	(Slovakia) Spartak Trnava	3–0	1–2
Hajduk Split (Croatia)	0–3	(Bulgaria) Levski Sofia	0–0	0–3
Celtic (Scotland)	3–0	(Israel) Hapoel Tel Aviv	2–0	1–0
Lausanne-Sports (Switzerland)	3–6	(Spain) Celta Vigo	3–2	0–4
Ionikos (Greece)	1–4	(France) Nantes	1–3	0–1
Aris (Greece)	3–2	(Switzerland) Servette	1–1	2–1 (a.e.t.)
Monaco (France)	6–3	(Scotland) St Johnstone	3–0	3–3
Inter Slovnaft Bratislava (Slovakia)	3–1	(Austria) Rapid Wien	1–0	2–1
Lyngby (Denmark)	1–5	(Russia) Lokomotiv Moscow	1–2	0–3
Skonto (Latvia)	1–2	(Poland) Widzew Łódź	1–0	0–2
Roma (Italy)	7–1	(Portugal) Vitória de Setúbal	7–0	0–1
Parma (Italy)	6–2	(Ukraine) Kryvbas Kryvyi Rih	3–2	3–0
Hapoel Haifa (Israel)	5–5 (a)	(Belgium) Club Brugge	3–1	2–4
Torpedo Kutaisi (Georgia (country))	1–7	(Greece) AEK Athens	0–1	1–6
Omonia (Cyprus)	2–10	(Italy) Juventus	2–5	0–5
West Ham United (England)	6–1	(Croatia) Osijek	3–0	3–1
Vojvodina (Federal Republic of Yugoslavia)	2–3	(Czech Republic) Slavia Prague	0–0	2–3
Sigma Olomouc (Czech Republic)	1–3	(Spain) Mallorca	1–3	0–0
Benfica (Portugal)	2–1	(Romania) Dinamo București	0–1	2–0
Ajax (Netherlands)	9–2	(Slovakia) Dukla Banská Bystrica	6–1	3–1
Tottenham Hotspur (England)	3–0	(Moldova) Zimbru Chișinău	3–0	0–0
Zenit Saint Petersburg (Russia)	2–5	(Italy) Bologna	0–3	2–2
Anorthosis Famagusta (Cyprus)	1–2	(Poland) Legia Warsaw	1–0	0–2
Locomotive Tbilisi (Georgia (country))	0–9	(Greece) PAOK	0–7	0–2
AB (Denmark)	1–3	(Switzerland) Grasshopper	0–2	1–1
Zürich (Switzerland)	5–3	(Belgium) Lierse	1–0	4–3

== Matches ==
14 September 1999
18:00

Steaua București (Romania)	2–0	(Austria) LASK
Ciocoiu 63'; Dănciulescu 83'	Report

Stadionul Steaua, Bucharest
Attendance: 3,600
Referee: Steve Dunn (England)
28 September 1999
18:00

LASK (Austria)	2–3	(Romania) Steaua București
Stumpf 6'; Sané 89'	Report	Bordeanu 8'; Ilie 30'; Duro 61'

Linzer Stadion, Linz
Attendance: 5,500
Referee: Arturo Daudén Ibáñez (Spain)

Steaua București won 5–2 on aggregate.

14 September 1999
18:00

VfL Wolfsburg (Germany)	2–0	(Hungary) Debrecen
Akonnor 61'; Juskowiak 87'	Report

VfL-Stadion, Wolfsburg
Attendance: 7,200
Referee: Mikko Vuorela (Finland)
28 September 1999
18:00

Debrecen (Hungary)	2–1	(Germany) VfL Wolfsburg
Sabo 54', 90'	Report	Akpoborie 25'

Stadion Oláh Gábor Út, Debrecen
Attendance: 4,500
Referee: John Rowbotham (Scotland)

VfL Wolfsburg won 3–2 on aggregate.

14 September 1999
16:00

Red Star Belgrade (Federal Republic of Yugoslavia)	0–1	(France) Montpellier
	Report	Loko 6'

Georgi Asparuhov Stadium, Sofia, Bulgaria (Note: Due to a flight embargo caused by sanctions resulting from the Kosovo War and NATO bombing of Yugoslavia, UEFA decided that, from the first round, Yugoslav teams were required to play their home matches at neutral venues until commercial flights resumed.)
Attendance: 7,800
Referee: Dermot Gallagher (England)
28 September 1999
18:00

Montpellier (France)	2–2	(Federal Republic of Yugoslavia) Red Star Belgrade
Ouédec 34'; Delaye 52'	Report	Jelić 48'; Bošković 55'

Stade de la Mosson, Montpellier
Attendance: 9,246
Referee: Livio Bazzoli (Italy)

Montpellier won 3–2 on aggregate.

14 September 1999
18:00

Udinese (Italy)	1–0	(Denmark) AaB
Sottil 9'	Report

Stadio Friuli, Udine
Attendance: 17,661
Referee: Lubomír Puček (Czech Republic)
30 September 1999
20:35

AaB (Denmark)	1–2	(Italy) Udinese
Matovac 71'	Report	Muzzi 63'; Locatelli 90'

Aalborg Stadion, Aalborg
Attendance: 8,750
Referee: Dani Koren (Israel)

Udinese won 3–1 on aggregate.

14 September 1999
18:00

Stabæk (Norway)	1–0	(Spain) Deportivo La Coruña
Finstad 57'	Report

Ullevaal Stadion, Oslo
Attendance: 3,809
Referee: Romāns Lajuks (Latvia)
30 September 1999
21:30

Deportivo La Coruña (Spain)	2–0	(Norway) Stabæk
Jokanović 37'; Conceição 63'	Report

Estadio Riazor, A Coruña
Attendance: 15,915
Referee: Kenny Clark (Scotland)

Deportivo La Coruña won 2–1 on aggregate.

14 September 1999
17:30

Partizan (Federal Republic of Yugoslavia)	1–3	(England) Leeds United
Tomić 20'	Report	Bowyer 26', 82'; Radebe 39'

Abe Lenstra Stadion, Heerenveen, Netherlands
Attendance: 4,950
Referee: Herbert Fandel (Germany)
30 September 1999
21:00

Leeds United (England)	1–0	(Federal Republic of Yugoslavia) Partizan
Huckerby 55'	Report

Elland Road, Leeds
Attendance: 39,806
Referee: Fritz Stuchlik (Austria)

Leeds United won 4–1 on aggregate.

15 September 1999
18:00

HJK (Finland)	0–1	(France) Lyon
	Report	Vairelles 16'

Helsinki Olympic Stadium, Helsinki
Attendance: 8,103
Referee: Michal Beneš (Czech Republic)
30 September 1999
20:45

Lyon (France)	5–1	(Finland) HJK
Anderson 11'; Blanc 15'; Linarès 18'; Vairelles 70', 86'	Report	Lehkosuo 40'

Stade de Gerland, Lyon
Attendance: 15,016
Referee: Edo Trivković (Croatia)

Lyon won 6–1 on aggregate.

16 September 1999
21:30

Atlético Madrid (Spain)	3–0	(Turkey) Ankaragücü
Gamarra 43'; Hasselbaink 43'; Paunović 58'	Report

Vicente Calderón Stadium, Madrid
Attendance: 11,600
Referee: Georg Dardenne (Germany)
30 September 1999
18:30

Ankaragücü (Turkey)	1–0	(Spain) Atlético Madrid
Aksancak 85'	Report

Ankara 19 Mayıs Stadium, Ankara
Attendance: 1,700
Referee: Claus Bo Larsen (Denmark)

Atlético Madrid won 3–1 on aggregate.

16 September 1999
21:30

MTK Hungária (Hungary)	0–0	(Turkey) Fenerbahçe
	Report

Hidegkuti Nándor Stadium, Budapest
Attendance: 2,950
Referee: Miro Ukalovic (Sweden)
30 September 1999
19:30

Fenerbahçe (Turkey)	0–2	(Hungary) MTK Hungária
	Report	Kenesei 56', 60'

Şükrü Saracoğlu Stadium, Istanbul
Attendance: 13,000
Referee: Lutz Michael Fröhlich (Germany)

MTK Hungária won 2–0 on aggregate.

16 September 1999
20:00

Anderlecht (Belgium)	3–1	(Slovenia) Olimpija Ljubljana
Bajrektarevič 20' (o.g.); Radzinski 35', 66'	Report	Ekmečič 52'

Constant Vanden Stock Stadium, Brussels
Attendance: 14,157
Referee: Muhittin Boşat (Turkey)
30 September 1999
20:00

Olimpija Ljubljana (Slovenia)	0–3	(Belgium) Anderlecht
	Report	Koller 64'; Radzinski 69', 72'

Bežigrad Stadium, Ljubljana
Attendance: 800
Referee: Yuri Baskakov (Russia)

Anderlecht won 6–1 on aggregate.

16 September 1999
18:30

Roda JC (Netherlands)	2–0	(Ukraine) Shakhtar Donetsk
Doomernik 20'; Zafarin 25'	Report

Gemeentelijk Sportpark Kaalheide, Kerkrade
Attendance: 6,635
Referee: John Ferry (Northern Ireland)
30 September 1999
17:30

Shakhtar Donetsk (Ukraine)	1–3	(Netherlands) Roda JC
Benyo 32'	Report	Tchoutang 27'; van der Luer 81'; van Dessel 87'

Shakhtar Stadium, Donetsk
Attendance: 19,526
Referee: Metin Tokat (Turkey)

Roda JC won 5–1 on aggregate.

16 September 1999
18:00

Bodø/Glimt (Norway)	0–5	(Germany) Werder Bremen
	Report	Pizarro 12', 75'; Bogdanović 44', 54'; Maksymov 59'

Lerkendal Stadion, Trondheim
Attendance: 1,425
Referee: Ihor Yarmenchuk (Ukraine)
30 September 1999
20:00

Werder Bremen (Germany)	1–1	(Norway) Bodø/Glimt
Aílton 76'	Report	Staurvik 36'

Weserstadion, Bremen
Attendance: 15,291
Referee: Orhan Erdemir (Turkey)

Werder Bremen won 6–1 on aggregate.

16 September 1999
20:00

Viking (Norway)	3–0	(Portugal) Sporting CP
Svensson 57'; Berre 69'; Espevoll 77' (pen.)	Report

Stavanger Stadion, Stavanger
Attendance: 4,080
Referee: Fiorenzo Treossi (Italy)
30 September 1999
20:00

Sporting CP (Portugal)	1–0	(Norway) Viking
Ayew 71'	Report

Estádio José Alvalade, Lisbon
Attendance: 17,000
Referee: Marcel Lica (Romania)

Viking won 3–1 on aggregate.

16 September 1999
17:00

Maccabi Tel Aviv (Israel)	2–2	(France) Lens
Kubica 43'; Dayan 75'	Report	Sakho 38'; Job 55'

Ramat Gan Stadium, Ramat Gan
Attendance: 2,500
Referee: Ivan Dobrinov (Bulgaria)
30 September 1999
18:00

Lens (France)	2–1	(Israel) Maccabi Tel Aviv
Nouma 77'; Delporte 80'	Report	Basis 24'

Stade Félix-Bollaert, Lens
Attendance: 35,663
Referee: Manuel Mejuto González (Spain)

Lens won 4–3 on aggregate.

16 September 1999
20:30

1. FC Kaiserslautern (Germany)	3–0	(Scotland) Kilmarnock
Koch 29'; Djorkaeff 75'; Marschall 39'	Report

Fritz-Walter-Stadion, Kaiserslautern
Attendance: 21,000
Referee: Jorge Coroado (Portugal)
30 September 1999
18:00

Kilmarnock (Scotland)	0–2	(Germany) 1. FC Kaiserslautern
	Report	Djorkaeff 22'; Ramzy 29'

Rugby Park, Kilmarnock
Attendance: 8,050
Referee: Costas Kapitanis (Cyprus)

Kilmarnock won 5–0 on aggregate.

16 September 1999
19:00

Helsingborgs IF (Sweden)	1–1	(Ukraine) Karpaty Lviv
Jonson 85'	Report	Hetsko 17'

Olympia, Helsingborg
Attendance: 3,642
Referee: William Young (Scotland)
30 September 1999
18:00

Karpaty Lviv (Ukraine)	1–1 (a.e.t.)	(Sweden) Helsingborgs IF
Hetsko 90+2'	Report	Jonson 90'
Penalties
Hetsko (penalty missed); Yevtushok (penalty missed); Mizin (penalty scored); Pavliukh (penalty scored)	2–4	(penalty scored) Jansson; (penalty scored) R. Nilsson; (penalty missed) Jonson; (penalty scored) Markstedt; (penalty scored) Jakobsson

Ukraina Stadium, Lviv
Attendance: 26,150
Referee: Vladimír Hriňák (Slovakia)

2–2 on aggregate; Helsingborgs IF won 4–2 on penalties.

16 September 1999
19:00

Lech Poznań (Poland)	1–2	(Sweden) IFK Göteborg
Żurawski 44' (pen.)	Report	Andersson 27'; Mild 83'

Stadion Poznań, Poznań
Attendance: 5,000
Referee: Zoran Arsić (FR Yugoslavia)
30 September 1999
19:00

IFK Göteborg (Sweden)	0–0	(Poland) Lech Poznań
	Report

Ullevi, Gothenburg
Attendance: 4,910
Referee: Andreas Schluchter (Switzerland)

IFK Göteborg won 2–1 on aggregate.

16 September 1999
19:15

Teplice (Czech Republic)	3–1	(Hungary) Ferencváros
Frýdek 33'; Kolomazník 54'; Rízek 71'	Report	Tóth 15'

Na Stínadlech, Teplice
Attendance: 10,258
Referee: Massimo Busacca (Switzerland)
30 September 1999
18:00

Ferencváros (Hungary)	1–1	(Czech Republic) Teplice
Mátyus 57' (pen.)	Report	Rada 53'

Üllői úti stadion, Budapest
Attendance: 8,534
Referee: Jacek Granat (Poland)

Teplice won 4–2 on aggregate.

16 September 1999
20:45

CSKA Sofia (Bulgaria)	0–2	(England) Newcastle United
	Report	Solano 51'; Ketsbaia 77'

Balgarska Armiya Stadium, Sofia
Attendance: 20,300
Referee: Juan Rocca (Spain)
30 September 1999
20:00

Newcastle United (England)	2–2	(Bulgaria) CSKA Sofia
Shearer 36'; Robinson 88'	Report	Litera 29'; Simeonov 90'

St James' Park, Newcastle upon Tyne
Attendance: 36,228
Referee: Luc Huyghe (Belgium)

Newcastle United won 4–2 on aggregate.

16 September 1999
16:00

HIT Gorica (Slovenia)	0–1	(Greece) Panathinaikos
	Report	Liberopoulos 14'

Sports Park, Nova Gorica
Attendance: 1,700
Referee: Eyal Zur (Israel)
30 September 1999
20:15

Panathinaikos (Greece)	2–0	(Slovenia) HIT Gorica
Sigurðsson 38'; Nasiopoulos 69'	Report

Olympic Stadium, Athens
Attendance: 6,280
Referee: Wolfgang Stark (Germany)

Panathinaikos won 3–0 on aggregate.

16 September 1999
21:00

Amica Wronki (Poland)	2–0	(Denmark) Brøndby
Dawidowski 22'; Bosacki 69'	Report

Stadion Amica, Wronki
Attendance: 2,863
Referee: Ceri Richards (Wales)
30 September 1999
18:30

Brøndby (Denmark)	4–3	(Poland) Amica Wronki
Madsen 35', 76'; Vragel 54'; Christensen 78'	Report	Kryszałowicz 52', 68'; Kukiełka 63' (pen.)

Brøndby Stadium, Brøndbyvester
Attendance: 5,907
Referee: Gylfi Orrason (Iceland)

Amica Wronki won 5–4 on aggregate.

16 September 1999
21:30

Beira-Mar (Portugal)	1–2	(Netherlands) Vitesse
Faye 41'	Report	Van Hooijdonk 50'; Grozdić 82'

Estádio Mário Duarte, Aveiro
Attendance: 3,500
Referee: Andreas Georgiou (Cyprus)
30 September 1999
21:00

Vitesse (Netherlands)	0–0	(Portugal) Beira-Mar
	Report

GelreDome, Arnhem
Attendance: 13,650
Referee: Roland Beck (Liechtenstein)

Vitesse won 2–0 on aggregate.

16 September 1999
20:30

GAK (Austria)	3–0	(Slovakia) Spartak Trnava
Akwuegbu 12', 56'; Adu 34'	Report

Arnold Schwarzenegger Stadium, Graz
Attendance: 3,070
Referee: Tom Henning Øvrebø (Norway)
30 September 1999
18:00

Spartak Trnava (Slovakia)	2–1	(Austria) GAK
Mužlay 45', 70'	Report	Standfest 14'

Štadión Antona Malatinského, Trnava
Attendance: 2,000
Referee: Eric Blareau (Belgium)

GAK won 4–2 on aggregate.

16 September 1999
17:45

Hajduk Split (Croatia)	0–0	(Bulgaria) Levski Sofia
	Report

Stadion Poljud, Split
Attendance: 11,627
Referee: Pasquale Rodomonti (Italy)
30 September 1999
14:45

Levski Sofia (Bulgaria)	3–0	(Croatia) Hajduk Split
Ivankov 16' (pen.); Bachev 33'; Dimitrov 85'	Report

Georgi Asparuhov Stadium, Sofia
Attendance: 24,000
Referee: Michael Riley (England)

Levski Sofia won 3–0 on aggregate.

16 September 1999
20:30

Celtic (Scotland)	2–0	(Israel) Hapoel Tel Aviv
Larsson 25', 50' (pen.)	Report

Celtic Park, Glasgow
Attendance: 45,171
Referee: Frank De Bleeckere (Belgium)
30 September 1999
20:45

Hapoel Tel Aviv (Israel)	0–1	(Scotland) Celtic
	Report	Larsson 63'

Bloomfield Stadium, Tel Aviv
Attendance: 6,400
Referee: Juan Manuel Brito Arceo (Spain)

Celtic won 3–0 on aggregate.

16 September 1999
20:15

Lausanne-Sports (Switzerland)	3–2	(Spain) Celta Vigo
Kuzba 20'; Mazzoni 21', 57'	Report	Revivo 62'; Karpin 66' (pen.)

Olympique de la Pontaise, Lausanne
Attendance: 7,770
Referee: Gary Willard (England)
30 September 1999
20:00

Celta Vigo (Spain)	4–0	(Switzerland) Lausanne-Sports
McCarthy 11', 84', 90+2'; Mostovoi 76'	Report

Balaídos, Vigo
Attendance: 12,840
Referee: Stéphane Bré (France)

Celta Vigo won 6–3 on aggregate.

16 September 1999
19:30

Ionikos (Greece)	1–3	(France) Nantes
Dimitriadis 90'	Report	Lièvre 56'; Monterrubio 67', 83'

Olympic Stadium, Athens
Attendance: 1,335
Referee: Manfred Schüttengruber (Austria)
30 September 1999
19:00

Nantes (France)	1–0	(Greece) Ionikos
Da Rocha 48'	Report

Stade de la Beaujoire, Nantes
Attendance: 18,522
Referee: Morgan Norman (Sweden)

Nantes won 4–1 on aggregate.

16 September 1999
20:00

Aris (Greece)	1–1	(Switzerland) Servette
Mantzios 11'	Report	Petrov 88'

Kleanthis Vikelidis Stadium, Thessaloniki
Attendance: 17,127
Referee: Knud Erik Fisker (Denmark)
30 September 1999
20:30

Servette (Switzerland)	1–2 (a.e.t.)	(Greece) Aris
Lonfat 35'	Report	Paulo Andrioli 37'; Kyzeridis 97'

Charmilles Stadium, Geneva
Attendance: 5,228
Referee: René Temmink (Netherlands)

Aris won 3–2 on aggregate.

16 September 1999
20:45

Monaco (France)	3–0	(Scotland) St Johnstone
Simone 69', 89'; Trezeguet 72'	Report

Stade Louis II, Monaco
Attendance: 7,881
Referee: Edgar Steinborn (Germany)
30 September 1999
20:45

St Johnstone (Scotland)	3–3	(France) Monaco
Griffin 24' (pen.); Dasovic 33'; O'Neil 75'	Report	Léonard 4' (pen.); Pršo 9'; Legwinski 69'

McDiarmid Park, Perth
Attendance: 7,706
Referee: Victor José Esquinas Torres (Spain)

Monaco won 6–3 on aggregate.

16 September 1999
18:30

Inter Slovnaft Bratislava (Slovakia)	1–0	(Austria) Rapid Wien
Ľalík 45'	Report

Štadión Pasienky, Bratislava
Attendance: 6,596
Referee: Pascal Garibian (France)
30 September 1999
21:30

Rapid Wien (Austria)	1–2	(Slovakia) Inter Slovnaft Bratislava
Zingler 65'	Report	Suchancok 45'; Babnič 64'

Gerhard Hanappi Stadium, Vienna
Attendance: 6,068
Referee: Valentin Ivanov (Russia)

Inter Slovnaft Bratislava won 3–1 on aggregate.

16 September 1999
18:30

Lyngby (Denmark)	1–2	(Russia) Lokomotiv Moscow
Arifullin 69' (o.g.)	Report	Chugaynov 13'; Bulykin 37'

Lyngby Stadium, Lyngby
Attendance: 1,500
Referee: Dick van Egmond (Netherlands)
30 September 1999
18:00

Lokomotiv Moscow (Russia)	3–0	(Denmark) Lyngby
Kharlachev 20'; Drozdov 43'; Janashia 44'	Report

Lokomotiv Stadium, Moscow
Attendance: 7,500
Referee: Milan Mitrović (Slovenia)

Lokomotiv Moscow won 5–1 on aggregate.

16 September 1999
17:30

Skonto (Latvia)	1–0	(Poland) Widzew Łódź
Astafjevs 31'	Report

Daugava Stadium, Riga
Attendance: 780
Referee: Jon Skjervold (Norway)
30 September 1999
18:00

Widzew Łódź (Poland)	2–0	(Latvia) Skonto
Wichniarek 1'; Gęsior 43'	Report

Stadion Widzewa, Łódź
Attendance: 4,000
Referee: Kristinn Jakobsson (Iceland)

Widzew Łódź won 2–1 on aggregate.

16 September 1999
21:30

Roma (Italy)	7–0	(Portugal) Vitória de Setúbal
Aldair 12'; Montella 13'; Alenichev 15', 54', 75'; Assunção 39'; Delvecchio 73'	Report

Stadio Olimpico, Rome
Attendance: 23,013
Referee: Vasili Melnychuk (Ukraine)
30 September 1999
22:30

Vitória de Setúbal (Portugal)	1–0	(Italy) Roma
Makinwa 79'	Report

Estádio do Bonfim, Setúbal
Attendance: 3,500
Referee: Dieter Schoch (Switzerland)

Roma won 7–1 on aggregate.

16 September 1999
19:15

Parma (Italy)	3–2	(Ukraine) Kryvbas Kryvyi Rih
Di Vaio 13', 20'; Baggio 67'	Report	Palyanytsya 5'; Monaryov 74'

Stadio Ennio Tardini, Parma
Attendance: 3,887
Referee: Stuart Dougal (Scotland)
30 September 1999
18:00

Kryvbas Kryvyi Rih (Ukraine)	0–3	(Italy) Parma
	Report	Boghossian 36'; Crespo 40'; Di Vaio 67'

Metalurh Stadium, Kryvyi Rih
Attendance: 28,000
Referee: Konrad Plautz (Austria)

Parma won 6–2 on aggregate.

16 September 1999
19:15

Hapoel Haifa (Israel)	3–1	(Belgium) Club Brugge
Turgeman 18', 32'; Sivilia 44'	Report	Jankauskas 65'

Kiryat Eliezer Stadium, Haifa
Attendance: 6,000
Referee: Constantin Zotta (Romania)
- The four Russian officials appointed to referee the match were sacked after arriving in Tel Aviv drunk. Four Romanian officials were quickly sent to Tel Aviv to take charge of the game.
30 September 1999
20:30

Club Brugge (Belgium)	4–2	(Israel) Hapoel Haifa
Verheyen 20'; Borkelmans 25'; Janssen 52', 90'	Report	Roso 18'; Turgeman 78'

Olympiastadion, Brugge
Attendance: 8,747
Referee: Roy Helge Olsen (Norway)

5–5 on aggregate; Hapoel Haifa won on away goals.

16 September 1999
14:00

Torpedo Kutaisi (Georgia (country))	0–1	(Greece) AEK Athens
	Report	Zikos 90+1'

Ramaz Shengelia Stadium, Kutaisi
Attendance: 7,100
Referee: John McDermott (Republic of Ireland)
30 September 1999
16:00

AEK Athens (Greece)	6–1	(Georgia (country)) Torpedo Kutaisi
Ćirić 8' (pen.); Bjeković 22'; Maladenis 24'; Kopitsis 44', 88'; Nikolaidis 73'	Report	Megreladze 72'

Nea Smyrni Stadium, Athens
Attendance: 4,008
Referee: Miroslav Liba (Czech Republic)

AEK Athens won 7–1 on aggregate.

16 September 1999
20:00

Omonia (Cyprus)	2–5	(Italy) Juventus
Kontolefteros 75', 86'	Report	Inzaghi 2', 17'; Kovačević 22'; Esnáider 24'; Del Piero 82'

Makario Stadium, Nicosia
Attendance: 12,485
Referee: Sergey Shmolik (Belarus)
30 September 1999
20:30

Juventus (Italy)	5–0	(Cyprus) Omonia
Kovačević 21', 47', 86'; Tacchinardi 55'; Conte 90'	Report

Stadio La Favorita, Palermo
Attendance: 27,527
Referee: Sorin Corpodean (Romania)

Juventus won 10–2 on aggregate.

16 September 1999
21:00

West Ham United (England)	3–0	(Croatia) Osijek
Wanchope 39'; Di Canio 48'; Lampard 58'	Report

Boleyn Ground, London
Attendance: 25,331
Referee: Paulo Paraty (Portugal)
30 September 1999
21:00

Osijek (Croatia)	1–3	(England) West Ham United
Bubalo 70'	Report	Kitson 27'; Ruddock 83'; Foé 90'

Stadion Gradski vrt, Osijek
Attendance: 7,700
Referee: Jack van Hulten (Netherlands)

West Ham United won 6–1 on aggregate.

16 September 1999
16:30

Vojvodina (Federal Republic of Yugoslavia)	0–0	(Czech Republic) Slavia Prague
	Report

Gradski stadion, Skopje, Macedonia
Attendance: 700
Referee: Roelof Luinge (Netherlands)
30 September 1999
17:00

Slavia Prague (Czech Republic)	3–2	(Federal Republic of Yugoslavia) Vojvodina
Petrouš 40'; Došek 74'; Zelenka 80'	Report	Belić 18'; Bogdanović 47'

Stadion Evžena Rošického, Prague
Attendance: 3,170
Referee: Domenico Messina (Italy)

Slavia Prague won 3–2 on aggregate.

16 September 1999
16:50

Sigma Olomouc (Czech Republic)	1–3	(Spain) Mallorca
Kobylík 63'	Report	Engonga 12'; Tristán 53'; Stanković 76'

Andrův stadion, Olomouc
Attendance: 4,020
Referee: Leif Sundell (Sweden)
30 September 1999
21:30

Mallorca (Spain)	0–0	(Czech Republic) Sigma Olomouc
	Report

San Moix, Palma de Mallorca
Attendance: 12,640
Referee: Giorgos Bikas (Greece)

Mallorca won 3–1 on aggregate.

16 September 1999
22:15

Benfica (Portugal)	0–1	(Romania) Dinamo București
	Report	Năstase 35'

Estádio da Luz, Lisbon
Attendance: 31,000
Referee: Sándor Puhl (Hungary)
30 September 1999
19:45

Dinamo București (Romania)	0–2	(Portugal) Benfica
	Report	Maniche 25'; Chano 72'

Stadionul Național, Bucharest
Attendance: 11,144
Referee: Alan Snoddy (Northern Ireland)

Benfica won 2–1 on aggregate.

16 September 1999
20:30

Ajax (Netherlands)	6–1	(Slovakia) Dukla Banská Bystrica
Verlaat 26' (pen.); Reuser 27'; Knopper 48'; Machlas 50', 65'; Wamberto 72'	Report	Verlaat 15' (o.g.)

Amsterdam Arena, Amsterdam
Attendance: 26,145
Referee: Željko Širić (Croatia)
30 September 1999
20:00

Dukla Banská Bystrica (Slovakia)	1–3	(Netherlands) Ajax
Malatinský 45'	Report	Arveladze 47'; Bobson 64'; Laudrup 90'

SNP Stadium, Banská Bystrica
Attendance: 4,800
Referee: José Mendes Pratas (Portugal)

Ajax won 9–2 on aggregate.

16 September 1999
21:00

Tottenham Hotspur (England)	3–0	(Moldova) Zimbru Chișinău
Leonhardsen 3'; Perry 32'; Sherwood 55'	Report

White Hart Lane, London
Attendance: 32,660
Referee: Emanuel Zammit (Malta)
30 September 1999
19:00

Zimbru Chișinău (Moldova)	0–0	(England) Tottenham Hotspur
	Report

Republican Stadium, Chișinău
Attendance: 4,500
Referee: Georgios Kasnaferis (Greece)

Tottenham Hotspur won 3–0 on aggregate.

16 September 1999
18:00

Zenit Saint Petersburg (Russia)	0–3	(Italy) Bologna
	Report	Ventola 39'; Signori 68', 90' (pen.)

Petrovsky Stadium, Saint Petersburg
Attendance: 19,900
Referee: Kyros Vassaras (Greece)
30 September 1999
17:00

Bologna (Italy)	2–2	(Russia) Zenit Saint Petersburg
Fontolan 39'; Cipriani 74'	Report	Panov 35'; Kondrashov 89'

Stadio Renato Dall'Ara, Bologna
Attendance: 12,126
Referee: Eric Romain (Belgium)

Bologna won 5–2 on aggregate.

16 September 1999
19:00

Anorthosis Famagusta (Cyprus)	1–0	(Poland) Legia Warsaw
Engomitis 83'	Report

Antonis Papadopoulos Stadium, Larnaca
Attendance: 3,500
Referee: Lawrence Sammut (Malta)
30 September 1999
20:00

Legia Warsaw (Poland)	2–0	(Cyprus) Anorthosis Famagusta
Mięciel 48'; Czereszewski 67'	Report

Polish Army Stadium, Warsaw
Attendance: 4,800
Referee: Constantin Zotta (Romania)

Legia Warsaw won 2–0 on aggregate.

16 September 1999
16:00

Locomotive Tbilisi (Georgia (country))	0–7	(Greece) PAOK
	Report	Georgiadis 16', 24'; Sabry 43'; Frousos 56', 63'; Frantzeskos 68'; Vryzas 69'

Boris Paichadze Stadium, Tbilisi
Attendance: 4,000
Referee: Attila Juhos (Hungary)
30 September 1999
20:00

PAOK (Greece)	2–0	(Georgia (country)) Locomotive Tbilisi
Valencia 53' (pen.); Salpingidis 81'	Report

Toumba Stadium, Thessaloniki
Attendance: 2,399
Referee: David Malcolm (Republic of Ireland)

PAOK won 9–0 on aggregate.

16 September 1999
20:30

AB (Denmark)	0–2	(Switzerland) Grasshopper
	Report	Bjur 50' (o.g.); Ekoku 82'

Gladsaxe Stadium, Gladsaxe
Attendance: 3,297
Referee: Laurent Duhamel (France)
30 September 1999
20:35

Grasshopper (Switzerland)	1–1	(Denmark) AB
Magro 80'	Report	Daugaard 31'

Hardturm, Zürich
Attendance: 3,800
Referee: Mika Peltola (Finland)

Grasshopper won 3–1 on aggregate.

16 September 1999
20:00

Zürich (Switzerland)	1–0	(Belgium) Lierse
Jamarauli 29'	Report

Letzigrund, Zürich
Attendance: 4,200
Referee: Michael McCurry (Scotland)
30 September 1999
20:00

Lierse (Belgium)	3–4	(Switzerland) Zürich
Van Meir 16'; Huysegems 72'; Zdebel 83'	Report	Jamarauli 2'; Frick 57'; Eydelie 86'; Daems 90' (o.g.)

Het Lisp, Lier
Attendance: 4,936
Referee: Erol Ersoy (Turkey)

Zürich won 5–3 on aggregate.
