= 1997–98 Slovenian PrvaLiga =

Slovenian PrvaLiga
- Season: 1997–98
- Champions: Maribor (2nd title)
- Relegated: SET Vevče
- Champions League: Maribor
- UEFA Cup: Mura
- Cup Winners' Cup: Rudar
- Intertoto Cup: Olimpija
- Matches played: 180
- Goals scored: 526 (2.92 per match)
- Top goalscorer: Ismet Ekmečić (21 goals)
- Biggest home win: Primorje 6–0 Korotan
- Biggest away win: Beltinci 1–5 Olimpija; Celje 1–5 Maribor
- Highest scoring: SET Vevče 4–7 Maribor
- Longest winning run: 7 games Mura; Maribor
- Longest unbeaten run: 16 games Mura; Maribor
- Longest winless run: 10 games SET Vevče
- Longest losing run: 5 games SET Vevče; Korotan
- Highest attendance: 8,000; Maribor 4–0 Primorje
- Lowest attendance: 300; Rudar 2–0 SET Vevče
- Total attendance: 254,800
- Average attendance: 1,415

The 1997–98 Slovenian PrvaLiga season started on 3 August 1997 and ended on 7 June 1998. Each team played a total of 36 matches.

== League table ==
Pos	Team	Pld	W	D	L	GF	GA	GD	Pts	Qualification or relegation
1	Maribor (C)	36	24	4	8	69	34	+35	76	Qualification to Champions League first qualifying round
2	Mura	36	19	10	7	63	42	+21	67	Qualification to UEFA Cup first qualifying round
3	Gorica	36	20	5	11	64	36	+28	65	
4	Primorje	36	17	6	13	63	49	+14	57	
5	Olimpija	36	13	12	11	59	55	+4	51	Qualification to Intertoto Cup first round
6	Celje	36	14	7	15	57	57	0	49	
7	Rudar Velenje	36	10	13	13	39	38	+1	43	Qualification to Cup Winners' Cup qualifying round
8	Korotan Prevalje	36	10	9	17	31	59	−28	39	
9	Beltinci (O)	36	9	7	20	44	73	−29	34	Qualification to relegation play-offs
10	SET Vevče (R)	36	4	7	25	37	83	−46	19	Qualification to relegation play-offs

Source: PrvaLiga (in Slovene)
(C) Champions; (O) Play-off winners; (R) Relegated

=== Relegation play-offs ===
13 June 1998
17:00 CEST

Beltinci	1–0	Železničar Maribor
Kotnik 90'

Sports Park, Beltinci
Attendance: 1,500
Referee: Radenko Mijatović
17 June 1998
17:00 CEST

Železničar Maribor	1–4	Beltinci
Pipenbaher 82'		Baranja 10'; Moro 35', 60'; Škafar 70'

Tabor Sports Park, Maribor
Attendance: 1,200
Referee: Milan Mitrović

Beltinci won 5–1 on aggregate.

13 June 1998
17:00 CEST

SET Vevče	1–3	Domžale
Karapetrović 58'		Žinič 44'; Šalja 63', 68'

Kodeljevo Sports Park, Ljubljana
Attendance: 500
Referee: Božo Tabar
17 June 1998
17:00 CEST

Domžale	1–1	SET Vevče
Škof 90'		Jolič 71'

Sports Park, Domžale
Attendance: 800
Referee: Matjaž Bohinc

Domžale won 4–2 on aggregate.

== Results ==
Every team plays four times against their opponents, twice at home and twice on the road, for a total of 36 matches.

=== First half of the season ===
Home \ Away	BEL	CEL	GOR	KPR	MAR	MUR	OLI	PRI	RUD	SET
Beltinci		2–1	1–1	1–1	0–1	0–2	2–4	1–2	3–1	0–1
Celje	4–0		1–1	4–1	2–1	0–0	2–0	6–2	2–2	4–3
Gorica	5–1	3–1		2–3	0–1	2–1	1–1	1–0	2–0	2–1
Korotan Prevalje	2–1	0–1	1–0		1–0	2–2	2–2	0–0	0–1	1–0
Maribor	5–0	3–0	1–0	2–0		1–3	2–0	0–1	1–0	5–1
Mura	5–2	3–1	2–2	1–0	1–0		2–0	2–0	2–1	1–0
Olimpija	1–0	1–1	2–0	3–1	3–1	3–1		3–3	2–1	0–0
Primorje	1–3	4–2	0–1	2–0	2–0	4–2	5–2		2–1	4–1
Rudar Velenje	3–0	0–0	1–0	3–0	1–1	1–2	1–1	2–0		2–0
SET Vevče	0–2	1–3	0–4	1–1	1–3	1–4	2–2	0–3	1–0	

Source: PrvaLiga (in Slovene)
Legend: Blue = home team win; Yellow = draw; Red = away team win.

=== Second half of the season ===
Home \ Away	BEL	CEL	GOR	KPR	MAR	MUR	OLI	PRI	RUD	SET
Beltinci		0–1	2–1	4–2	0–1	2–2	1–5	1–0	1–3	5–0
Celje	3–0		1–2	0–2	1–5	1–1	5–2	2–1	1–1	2–1
Gorica	1–0	2–0		5–0	3–0	3–0	3–0	2–1	1–1	4–1
Korotan Prevalje	1–1	1–0	2–1		1–2	1–1	1–0	1–1	1–1	0–1
Maribor	3–1	3–1	2–0	1–0		2–1	4–4	4–0	0–0	2–1
Mura	2–2	0–2	2–1	2–0	0–0		0–0	0–1	4–2	3–0
Olimpija	1–2	2–0	1–2	4–0	1–3	1–2		1–1	1–1	1–0
Primorje	5–1	1–0	2–1	6–0	0–1	2–2	1–2		0–1	1–0
Rudar Velenje	0–0	2–1	1–2	2–0	0–1	0–1	1–1	1–3		0–0
SET Vevče	2–2	4–1	2–3	1–2	4–7	2–4	1–2	2–2	1–1	

Source: PrvaLiga (in Slovene)
Legend: Blue = home team win; Yellow = draw; Red = away team win.

== Top goalscorers ==
Rank	Player	Club	Goals
1	(Slovenia) Ismet Ekmečić	Olimpija	21
2	(Bosnia and Herzegovina) Faik Kamberović	Celje	17
3	(Slovenia) Štefan Škaper	Mura	16
4	(Slovenia) Anton Žlogar	Primorje	15
5	(Slovenia) Novica Nikčević	Gorica	14
6	(Slovenia) Dejan Kečan	Beltinci	13
7	(Bosnia and Herzegovina) Goran Gutalj	Mura	12
7	(Slovenia) Patrik Ipavec	Primorje	12
9	(Brazil) Wanderson de Paul Somalia	Celje	10
9	(Slovenia) Marko Kmetec	Maribor	10

== See also ==
- 1997–98 Slovenian Football Cup
- 1997–98 Slovenian Second League
