= UEFA Euro 2000 squads =

Football tournament

The UEFA Euro 2000 finals tournament took place in Belgium and the Netherlands between 10 June and 2 July 2000. The sixteen nations that qualified were required to name a squad of 22 players for the tournament by 1 June 2000. The ages listed are the players' ages on the tournament's opening day (10 June 2000).

== Group A ==
=== England ===
Manager: Kevin Keegan

England named a 28-man preliminary squad on 16 May 2000. Jamie Redknapp and Ray Parlour were both ruled out of the tournament due to respective knee injuries, while Andy Cole missed out because of a persistent toe injury. Keegan announced his final 22-man squad on 1 June with David James, Rio Ferdinand and Kieron Dyer also missing out.

No.	Pos.	Player	Date of birth (age)	Caps	Club
1	GK	David Seaman	19 September 1963 (aged 36)	57	(England) Arsenal
2	DF	Gary Neville	18 February 1975 (aged 25)	38	(England) Manchester United
3	DF	Phil Neville	21 January 1977 (aged 23)	25	(England) Manchester United
4	DF	Sol Campbell	18 September 1974 (aged 25)	32	(England) Tottenham Hotspur
5	DF	Tony Adams	10 October 1966 (aged 33)	62	(England) Arsenal
6	DF	Martin Keown	24 July 1966 (aged 33)	30	(England) Arsenal
7	MF	David Beckham	2 May 1975 (aged 25)	30	(England) Manchester United
8	MF	Paul Scholes	16 November 1974 (aged 25)	22	(England) Manchester United
9	FW	Alan Shearer (captain)	13 August 1970 (aged 29)	60	(England) Newcastle United
10	FW	Michael Owen	14 December 1979 (aged 20)	19	(England) Liverpool
11	MF	Steve McManaman	11 February 1972 (aged 28)	27	(Spain) Real Madrid
12	DF	Gareth Southgate	3 September 1970 (aged 29)	35	(England) Aston Villa
13	GK	Nigel Martyn	11 August 1966 (aged 33)	11	(England) Leeds United
14	MF	Paul Ince	21 October 1967 (aged 32)	50	(England) Middlesbrough
15	DF	Gareth Barry	23 February 1981 (aged 19)	2	(England) Aston Villa
16	MF	Steven Gerrard	30 May 1980 (aged 20)	1	(England) Liverpool
17	MF	Dennis Wise	16 December 1966 (aged 33)	16	(England) Chelsea
18	MF	Nick Barmby	11 February 1974 (aged 26)	13	(England) Everton
19	FW	Emile Heskey	11 January 1978 (aged 22)	7	(England) Liverpool
20	FW	Kevin Phillips	25 July 1973 (aged 26)	5	(England) Sunderland
21	FW	Robbie Fowler	9 April 1975 (aged 25)	14	(England) Liverpool
22	GK	Richard Wright	5 November 1977 (aged 22)	1	(England) Ipswich Town

=== Germany ===
Manager: Erich Ribbeck

No.	Pos.	Player	Date of birth (age)	Caps	Club
1	GK	Oliver Kahn	15 June 1969 (aged 30)	24	(Germany) Bayern Munich
2	DF	Markus Babbel	8 September 1972 (aged 27)	49	(Germany) Bayern Munich
3	DF	Marko Rehmer	29 April 1972 (aged 28)	11	(Germany) Hertha BSC
4	DF	Thomas Linke	26 December 1969 (aged 30)	15	(Germany) Bayern Munich
5	MF	Marco Bode	23 July 1969 (aged 30)	20	(Germany) Werder Bremen
6	DF	Jens Nowotny	11 January 1974 (aged 26)	19	(Germany) Bayer Leverkusen
7	MF	Mehmet Scholl	16 October 1970 (aged 29)	26	(Germany) Bayern Munich
8	MF	Thomas Häßler	30 May 1966 (aged 34)	99	(Germany) 1860 Munich
9	FW	Ulf Kirsten	4 December 1965 (aged 34)	49	(Germany) Bayer Leverkusen
10	DF	Lothar Matthäus	21 March 1961 (aged 39)	147	(United States) MetroStars
11	FW	Paulo Rink	21 February 1973 (aged 27)	8	(Germany) Bayer Leverkusen
12	GK	Jens Lehmann	10 November 1969 (aged 30)	12	(Germany) Borussia Dortmund
13	MF	Michael Ballack	26 September 1976 (aged 23)	6	(Germany) Bayer Leverkusen
14	MF	Dietmar Hamann	27 August 1973 (aged 26)	24	(England) Liverpool
15	MF	Dariusz Wosz	8 June 1969 (aged 31)	15	(Germany) Hertha BSC
16	MF	Jens Jeremies	5 March 1974 (aged 26)	23	(Germany) Bayern Munich
17	DF	Christian Ziege	1 February 1972 (aged 28)	50	(England) Middlesbrough
18	MF	Sebastian Deisler	5 January 1980 (aged 20)	2	(Germany) Hertha BSC
19	FW	Carsten Jancker	28 August 1974 (aged 25)	7	(Germany) Bayern Munich
20	FW	Oliver Bierhoff (captain)	1 May 1968 (aged 32)	49	(Italy) AC Milan
21	MF	Carsten Ramelow	20 March 1974 (aged 26)	9	(Germany) Bayer Leverkusen
22	GK	Hans-Jörg Butt	28 May 1974 (aged 26)	1	(Germany) Hamburger SV

=== Portugal ===
Manager: Humberto Coelho

No.	Pos.	Player	Date of birth (age)	Caps	Club
1	GK	Vítor Baía (captain)	15 October 1969 (aged 30)	69	(Portugal) Porto
2	DF	Jorge Costa	14 October 1971 (aged 28)	25	(Portugal) Porto
3	DF	Rui Jorge	27 March 1973 (aged 27)	3	(Portugal) Sporting CP
4	MF	José Luís Vidigal	15 March 1973 (aged 27)	3	(Portugal) Sporting CP
5	DF	Fernando Couto	2 August 1969 (aged 30)	62	(Italy) Lazio
6	MF	Paulo Sousa	30 August 1970 (aged 29)	43	(Italy) Parma
7	MF	Luís Figo	4 November 1972 (aged 27)	59	(Spain) Barcelona
8	FW	João Pinto	19 August 1971 (aged 28)	56	(Portugal) Benfica
9	FW	Ricardo Sá Pinto	10 October 1972 (aged 27)	36	(Spain) Real Sociedad
10	MF	Rui Costa	29 March 1972 (aged 28)	50	(Italy) Fiorentina
11	MF	Sérgio Conceição	15 November 1974 (aged 25)	22	(Italy) Lazio
12	GK	Pedro Espinha	25 September 1965 (aged 34)	3	(Portugal) Vitória de Guimarães
13	DF	Dimas Teixeira	16 February 1969 (aged 31)	33	(Belgium) Standard Liège
14	DF	Abel Xavier	30 November 1972 (aged 27)	13	(England) Everton
15	MF	Costinha	1 December 1974 (aged 25)	3	(France) Monaco
16	DF	Beto	3 May 1976 (aged 24)	4	(Portugal) Sporting CP
17	MF	Paulo Bento	20 June 1969 (aged 30)	20	(Spain) Oviedo
18	FW	Pauleta	28 April 1973 (aged 27)	13	(Spain) Deportivo La Coruña
19	MF	Capucho	21 February 1972 (aged 28)	12	(Portugal) Porto
20	DF	Carlos Secretário	12 May 1970 (aged 30)	28	(Portugal) Porto
21	FW	Nuno Gomes	5 July 1976 (aged 23)	10	(Portugal) Benfica
22	GK	Quim	13 November 1975 (aged 24)	2	(Portugal) Braga

=== Romania ===
Manager: Emerich Jenei

No.	Pos.	Player	Date of birth (age)	Caps	Club
1	GK	Bogdan Lobonț	18 January 1978 (aged 22)	10	(Netherlands) Ajax
2	DF	Dan Petrescu	22 December 1967 (aged 32)	89	(England) Chelsea
3	DF	Liviu Ciobotariu	26 March 1971 (aged 29)	22	(Belgium) Standard Liège
4	DF	Iulian Filipescu	29 March 1974 (aged 26)	34	(Spain) Real Betis
5	MF	Constantin Gâlcă	8 March 1972 (aged 28)	54	(Spain) Espanyol
6	DF	Gheorghe Popescu	9 October 1967 (aged 32)	98	(Turkey) Galatasaray
7	FW	Adrian Mutu	8 January 1979 (aged 21)	4	(Italy) Inter Milan
8	MF	Dorinel Munteanu	25 June 1968 (aged 31)	86	(Germany) VfL Wolfsburg
9	FW	Viorel Moldovan	8 July 1972 (aged 27)	48	(France) Nantes
10	MF	Gheorghe Hagi (captain)	5 February 1965 (aged 35)	122	(Turkey) Galatasaray
11	FW	Adrian Ilie	20 April 1974 (aged 26)	34	(Spain) Valencia
12	GK	Bogdan Stelea	5 December 1967 (aged 32)	65	(Spain) Salamanca
13	DF	Cristian Chivu	26 October 1980 (aged 19)	3	(Netherlands) Ajax
14	MF	Florentin Petre	15 January 1976 (aged 24)	15	(Romania) Dinamo București
15	MF	Ioan Lupescu	9 December 1968 (aged 31)	68	(Romania) Dinamo București
16	FW	Laurențiu Roșu	26 October 1975 (aged 24)	12	(Romania) Steaua București
17	DF	Miodrag Belodedici	20 May 1964 (aged 36)	50	(Romania) Steaua București
18	FW	Ionel Ganea	10 August 1973 (aged 26)	12	(Germany) VfB Stuttgart
19	MF	Eric Lincar	16 October 1978 (aged 21)	3	(Romania) Steaua București
20	MF	Cătălin Hîldan	3 February 1976 (aged 24)	5	(Romania) Dinamo București
21	GK	Florin Prunea	8 August 1968 (aged 31)	36	(Romania) Universitatea Craiova
22	DF	Cosmin Contra	15 December 1975 (aged 24)	12	(Spain) Alavés

== Group B ==
=== Belgium ===
Manager: Robert Waseige

No.	Pos.	Player	Date of birth (age)	Caps	Club
1	GK	Filip De Wilde	5 July 1964 (aged 35)	31	(Belgium) Anderlecht
2	DF	Eric Deflandre	2 August 1973 (aged 26)	22	(Belgium) Club Brugge
3	DF	Joos Valgaeren	3 March 1976 (aged 24)	4	(Netherlands) Roda JC
4	DF	Lorenzo Staelens (captain)	30 April 1964 (aged 36)	69	(Belgium) Anderlecht
5	MF	Philippe Clement	22 March 1974 (aged 26)	11	(Belgium) Club Brugge
6	MF	Yves Vanderhaeghe	30 January 1970 (aged 30)	13	(Belgium) Mouscron
7	MF	Marc Wilmots	22 February 1969 (aged 31)	47	(Germany) Schalke 04
8	MF	Bart Goor	9 April 1973 (aged 27)	17	(Belgium) Anderlecht
9	FW	Émile Mpenza	4 July 1978 (aged 21)	23	(Germany) Schalke 04
10	FW	Branko Strupar	9 February 1970 (aged 30)	9	(England) Derby County
11	FW	Gert Verheyen	20 September 1970 (aged 29)	30	(Belgium) Club Brugge
12	GK	Geert De Vlieger	16 October 1971 (aged 28)	7	(Netherlands) Willem II
13	GK	Frédéric Herpoel	16 August 1974 (aged 25)	1	(Belgium) Gent
14	MF	Johan Walem	1 February 1972 (aged 28)	20	(Italy) Parma
15	DF	Jacky Peeters	13 December 1969 (aged 30)	6	(Germany) Arminia Bielefeld
16	FW	Luc Nilis	25 May 1967 (aged 33)	54	(Netherlands) PSV Eindhoven
17	DF	Philippe Léonard	12 February 1974 (aged 26)	18	(France) Monaco
18	DF	Nico Van Kerckhoven	14 December 1970 (aged 29)	24	(Germany) Schalke 04
19	DF	Eric Van Meir	28 February 1968 (aged 32)	17	(Belgium) Lierse
20	FW	Gilles De Bilde	9 June 1971 (aged 29)	22	(England) Sheffield Wednesday
21	FW	Mbo Mpenza	4 December 1976 (aged 23)	18	(Portugal) Sporting CP
22	MF	Marc Hendrikx	2 July 1974 (aged 25)	8	(Belgium) Genk

=== Italy ===
Manager: Dino Zoff

Italy named an initial 26-man squad for the tournament on 18 May 2000. Midfielders Dino Baggio and Diego Fuser, and defender Giuseppe Pancaro did not make the cut for the final 22, while forward Christian Vieri was ruled out through injury. Goalkeeper Gianluigi Buffon was originally named in the final 22, but suffered a broken hand in a warm-up friendly match against Norway on 3 June 2000; he was replaced in the squad by Christian Abbiati of AC Milan.

No.	Pos.	Player	Date of birth (age)	Caps	Club
1	GK	Christian Abbiati	8 July 1977 (aged 22)	0	(Italy) AC Milan
2	DF	Ciro Ferrara	11 February 1967 (aged 33)	48	(Italy) Juventus
3	DF	Paolo Maldini (captain)	26 June 1968 (aged 31)	105	(Italy) AC Milan
4	MF	Demetrio Albertini	23 August 1971 (aged 28)	67	(Italy) AC Milan
5	DF	Fabio Cannavaro	13 September 1973 (aged 26)	35	(Italy) Parma
6	DF	Paolo Negro	16 April 1972 (aged 28)	7	(Italy) Lazio
7	MF	Angelo Di Livio	26 July 1966 (aged 33)	27	(Italy) Fiorentina
8	MF	Antonio Conte	31 July 1969 (aged 30)	17	(Italy) Juventus
9	FW	Filippo Inzaghi	9 August 1973 (aged 26)	21	(Italy) Juventus
10	FW	Alessandro Del Piero	9 November 1974 (aged 25)	30	(Italy) Juventus
11	DF	Gianluca Pessotto	11 August 1970 (aged 29)	15	(Italy) Juventus
12	GK	Francesco Toldo	2 December 1971 (aged 28)	8	(Italy) Fiorentina
13	DF	Alessandro Nesta	19 March 1976 (aged 24)	25	(Italy) Lazio
14	MF	Luigi Di Biagio	3 June 1971 (aged 29)	15	(Italy) Inter Milan
15	DF	Mark Iuliano	12 August 1973 (aged 26)	5	(Italy) Juventus
16	MF	Massimo Ambrosini	29 May 1977 (aged 23)	5	(Italy) AC Milan
17	MF	Gianluca Zambrotta	19 February 1977 (aged 23)	6	(Italy) Juventus
18	MF	Stefano Fiore	17 April 1975 (aged 25)	4	(Italy) Udinese
19	FW	Vincenzo Montella	18 June 1974 (aged 25)	4	(Italy) Roma
20	FW	Francesco Totti	27 September 1976 (aged 23)	13	(Italy) Roma
21	FW	Marco Delvecchio	7 April 1973 (aged 27)	4	(Italy) Roma
22	GK	Francesco Antonioli	14 September 1969 (aged 30)	0	(Italy) Roma

=== Sweden ===
Managers: Lars Lagerbäck and Tommy Söderberg

No.	Pos.	Player	Date of birth (age)	Caps	Club
1	GK	Magnus Hedman	19 March 1973 (aged 27)	23	(England) Coventry City
2	DF	Roland Nilsson	27 November 1963 (aged 36)	112	(Sweden) Helsingborgs IF
3	DF	Patrik Andersson (captain)	18 August 1971 (aged 28)	77	(Germany) Bayern Munich
4	DF	Joachim Björklund	15 March 1971 (aged 29)	73	(Spain) Valencia
5	DF	Teddy Lučić	15 April 1973 (aged 27)	30	(Sweden) AIK
6	DF	Gary Sundgren	25 October 1967 (aged 32)	28	(Spain) Zaragoza
7	MF	Håkan Mild	14 June 1971 (aged 28)	56	(Sweden) IFK Göteborg
8	DF	Tomas Gustafsson	7 May 1973 (aged 27)	2	(England) Coventry City
9	MF	Freddie Ljungberg	16 April 1977 (aged 23)	15	(England) Arsenal
10	FW	Jörgen Pettersson	29 May 1975 (aged 25)	24	(Germany) 1. FC Kaiserslautern
11	MF	Niclas Alexandersson	29 December 1971 (aged 28)	42	(England) Sheffield Wednesday
12	GK	Magnus Kihlstedt	29 February 1972 (aged 28)	6	(Norway) Brann
13	MF	Magnus Svensson	10 March 1969 (aged 31)	12	(Denmark) Brøndby
14	DF	Olof Mellberg	3 September 1977 (aged 22)	4	(Spain) Racing Santander
15	MF	Daniel Andersson	28 August 1977 (aged 22)	20	(Italy) Bari
16	MF	Anders Andersson	15 March 1974 (aged 26)	13	(Denmark) AaB
17	MF	Johan Mjällby	9 February 1971 (aged 29)	19	(Scotland) Celtic
18	FW	Yksel Osmanovski	24 February 1977 (aged 23)	5	(Italy) Bari
19	FW	Kennet Andersson	6 October 1967 (aged 32)	76	(Italy) Bologna
20	FW	Henrik Larsson	20 September 1971 (aged 28)	48	(Scotland) Celtic
21	FW	Marcus Allbäck	5 July 1973 (aged 26)	4	(Sweden) Örgryte
22	GK	Mattias Asper	20 March 1974 (aged 26)	2	(Sweden) AIK

=== Turkey ===
Manager: Mustafa Denizli

No.	Pos.	Player	Date of birth (age)	Caps	Club
1	GK	Rüştü Reçber	10 May 1973 (aged 27)	42	(Turkey) Fenerbahçe
2	MF	Tayfur Havutçu	23 April 1970 (aged 30)	22	(Turkey) Beşiktaş
3	DF	Ogün Temizkanoğlu (captain)	6 October 1969 (aged 30)	60	(Turkey) Fenerbahçe
4	DF	Fatih Akyel	26 December 1977 (aged 22)	14	(Turkey) Galatasaray
5	DF	Alpay Özalan	29 May 1973 (aged 27)	45	(Turkey) Fenerbahçe
6	FW	Arif Erdem	2 January 1972 (aged 28)	33	(Turkey) Galatasaray
7	MF	Okan Buruk	19 October 1973 (aged 26)	10	(Turkey) Galatasaray
8	MF	Tugay Kerimoğlu	24 August 1970 (aged 29)	56	(Scotland) Rangers
9	FW	Hakan Şükür	1 September 1971 (aged 28)	53	(Turkey) Galatasaray
10	MF	Sergen Yalçın	5 October 1972 (aged 27)	29	(Turkey) Galatasaray
11	MF	Tayfun Korkut	2 April 1974 (aged 26)	23	(Turkey) Fenerbahçe
12	GK	Ömer Çatkıç	15 October 1974 (aged 25)	0	(Turkey) Gaziantepspor
13	DF	Osman Özköylü	26 August 1971 (aged 28)	11	(Turkey) Trabzonspor
14	MF	Suat Kaya	26 August 1967 (aged 32)	7	(Turkey) Galatasaray
15	MF	Muzzy Izzet	31 October 1974 (aged 25)	0	(England) Leicester City
16	DF	Ergün Penbe	17 May 1972 (aged 28)	4	(Turkey) Galatasaray
17	FW	Oktay Derelioğlu	17 December 1975 (aged 24)	13	(Turkey) Gaziantepspor
18	MF	Ayhan Akman	23 February 1977 (aged 23)	6	(Turkey) Beşiktaş
19	MF	Abdullah Ercan	8 December 1971 (aged 28)	52	(Turkey) Fenerbahçe
20	DF	Hakan Ünsal	14 May 1973 (aged 27)	13	(Turkey) Galatasaray
21	GK	Fevzi Tuncay	14 September 1977 (aged 22)	1	(Turkey) Beşiktaş
22	MF	Ümit Davala	30 July 1973 (aged 26)	7	(Turkey) Galatasaray

== Group C ==
=== FR Yugoslavia ===
Manager: Vujadin Boškov

No.	Pos.	Player	Date of birth (age)	Caps	Club
1	GK	Milorad Korać	10 March 1969 (aged 31)	0	(Federal Republic of Yugoslavia) Obilić
2	DF	Ivan Dudić	13 February 1977 (aged 23)	3	(Federal Republic of Yugoslavia) Red Star Belgrade
3	DF	Goran Đorović	11 November 1971 (aged 28)	42	(Spain) Celta Vigo
4	MF	Slaviša Jokanović	16 August 1968 (aged 31)	52	(Spain) Deportivo La Coruña
5	DF	Miroslav Đukić	19 February 1966 (aged 34)	37	(Spain) Valencia
6	MF	Dejan Stanković	11 September 1978 (aged 21)	20	(Italy) Lazio
7	MF	Vladimir Jugović	30 August 1969 (aged 30)	34	(Italy) Inter Milan
8	FW	Predrag Mijatović	19 January 1969 (aged 31)	49	(Italy) Fiorentina
9	FW	Savo Milošević	2 September 1973 (aged 26)	44	(Spain) Zaragoza
10	MF	Dragan Stojković (captain)	3 March 1965 (aged 35)	78	(Japan) Nagoya Grampus Eight
11	DF	Siniša Mihajlović	20 February 1969 (aged 31)	44	(Italy) Lazio
12	GK	Željko Cicović	2 September 1970 (aged 29)	3	(Spain) Las Palmas
13	DF	Slobodan Komljenović	2 January 1971 (aged 29)	18	(Germany) 1. FC Kaiserslautern
14	DF	Niša Saveljić	27 March 1970 (aged 30)	28	(France) Bordeaux
15	DF	Goran Bunjevčević	17 February 1973 (aged 27)	5	(Federal Republic of Yugoslavia) Red Star Belgrade
16	MF	Dejan Govedarica	2 October 1969 (aged 30)	26	(Netherlands) RKC Waalwijk
17	MF	Ljubinko Drulović	11 September 1968 (aged 31)	27	(Portugal) Porto
18	FW	Darko Kovačević	18 November 1973 (aged 26)	35	(Italy) Juventus
19	MF	Jovan Stanković	4 March 1971 (aged 29)	7	(Spain) Mallorca
20	FW	Mateja Kežman	12 April 1979 (aged 21)	3	(Federal Republic of Yugoslavia) Partizan
21	MF	Albert Nađ	29 October 1974 (aged 25)	33	(Spain) Oviedo
22	GK	Ivica Kralj	26 March 1973 (aged 27)	33	(Netherlands) PSV Eindhoven

=== Norway ===
Manager: Nils Johan Semb

No.	Pos.	Player	Date of birth (age)	Caps	Club
1	GK	Thomas Myhre	16 October 1973 (aged 26)	10	(England) Everton
2	DF	André Bergdølmo	13 October 1971 (aged 28)	24	(Norway) Rosenborg
3	DF	Bjørn Otto Bragstad	5 January 1971 (aged 29)	11	(Norway) Rosenborg
4	DF	Henning Berg (captain)	1 September 1969 (aged 30)	70	(England) Manchester United
5	DF	Trond Andersen	6 January 1975 (aged 25)	8	(England) Wimbledon
6	MF	Roar Strand	2 February 1970 (aged 30)	23	(Norway) Rosenborg
7	MF	Erik Mykland	21 July 1971 (aged 28)	72	(Greece) Panathinaikos
8	MF	Ståle Solbakken	27 February 1968 (aged 32)	57	(Denmark) AaB
9	FW	Tore André Flo	15 June 1973 (aged 26)	48	(England) Chelsea
10	MF	Kjetil Rekdal	6 November 1968 (aged 31)	83	(Norway) Vålerenga
11	MF	Bent Skammelsrud	18 May 1966 (aged 34)	35	(Norway) Rosenborg
12	GK	Frode Olsen	12 October 1967 (aged 32)	14	(Spain) Sevilla
13	GK	Morten Bakke	16 December 1968 (aged 31)	1	(Norway) Molde
14	DF	Vegard Heggem	13 July 1975 (aged 24)	18	(England) Liverpool
15	DF	John Arne Riise	24 September 1980 (aged 19)	5	(France) Monaco
16	DF	Dan Eggen	13 January 1970 (aged 30)	17	(Spain) Alavés
17	FW	John Carew	5 September 1979 (aged 20)	12	(Norway) Rosenborg
18	FW	Steffen Iversen	10 November 1976 (aged 23)	15	(England) Tottenham Hotspur
19	MF	Eirik Bakke	13 September 1977 (aged 22)	5	(England) Leeds United
20	FW	Ole Gunnar Solskjær	26 February 1973 (aged 27)	30	(England) Manchester United
21	DF	Vidar Riseth	21 April 1972 (aged 28)	25	(Scotland) Celtic
22	DF	Stig Inge Bjørnebye	11 December 1969 (aged 30)	71	(England) Liverpool

=== Slovenia ===
Manager: Srečko Katanec

No.	Pos.	Player	Date of birth (age)	Caps	Club
1	GK	Marko Simeunovič	6 December 1967 (aged 32)	26	(Slovenia) Maribor
2	DF	Spasoje Bulajič	24 November 1975 (aged 24)	8	(Germany) 1. FC Köln
3	DF	Željko Milinovič	12 October 1969 (aged 30)	16	(Austria) LASK
4	DF	Darko Milanič (captain)	18 December 1967 (aged 32)	40	(Austria) Sturm Graz
5	DF	Marinko Galič	22 April 1970 (aged 30)	50	(Slovenia) Maribor
6	DF	Aleksander Knavs	5 December 1975 (aged 24)	21	(Austria) Tirol Innsbruck
7	MF	Džoni Novak	4 September 1969 (aged 30)	47	(France) Sedan
8	MF	Aleš Čeh	7 April 1968 (aged 32)	51	(Austria) Grazer AK
9	FW	Sašo Udovič	13 December 1968 (aged 31)	37	(Austria) LASK
10	MF	Zlatko Zahovič	1 February 1971 (aged 29)	46	(Greece) Olympiacos
11	MF	Miran Pavlin	8 October 1971 (aged 28)	24	(Germany) Karlsruher SC
12	GK	Mladen Dabanovič	13 September 1971 (aged 28)	12	(Belgium) Lokeren
13	FW	Mladen Rudonja	26 July 1971 (aged 28)	37	(Belgium) Sint-Truiden
14	MF	Saša Gajser	11 February 1974 (aged 26)	5	(Belgium) Gent
15	MF	Rudi Istenič	10 January 1971 (aged 29)	17	(Germany) Uerdingen 05
16	MF	Anton Žlogar	24 November 1977 (aged 22)	1	(Slovenia) Gorica
17	FW	Ermin Šiljak	11 May 1973 (aged 27)	19	(Switzerland) Servette
18	MF	Milenko Ačimovič	15 February 1977 (aged 23)	20	(Federal Republic of Yugoslavia) Red Star Belgrade
19	DF	Amir Karič	31 December 1973 (aged 26)	24	(Slovenia) Maribor
20	FW	Milan Osterc	4 July 1975 (aged 24)	20	(Slovenia) Olimpija
21	MF	Zoran Pavlovič	27 June 1976 (aged 23)	4	(Croatia) Dinamo Zagreb
22	GK	Dejan Nemec	1 March 1977 (aged 23)	0	(Slovenia) Mura

=== Spain ===
Manager: José Antonio Camacho

No.	Pos.	Player	Date of birth (age)	Caps	Club
1	GK	Santiago Cañizares	18 December 1969 (aged 30)	24	(Spain) Valencia
2	DF	Míchel Salgado	22 October 1975 (aged 24)	13	(Spain) Real Madrid
3	DF	Agustín Aranzábal	15 March 1973 (aged 27)	18	(Spain) Real Sociedad
4	MF	Pep Guardiola	18 January 1971 (aged 29)	35	(Spain) Barcelona
5	DF	Abelardo	19 April 1970 (aged 30)	43	(Spain) Barcelona
6	DF	Fernando Hierro (captain)	23 March 1968 (aged 32)	71	(Spain) Real Madrid
7	MF	Iván Helguera	28 March 1975 (aged 25)	6	(Spain) Real Madrid
8	MF	Fran	14 July 1969 (aged 30)	10	(Spain) Deportivo La Coruña
9	FW	Pedro Munitis	19 June 1975 (aged 24)	10	(Spain) Racing Santander
10	FW	Raúl	27 June 1977 (aged 22)	31	(Spain) Real Madrid
11	FW	Alfonso	26 September 1972 (aged 27)	32	(Spain) Real Betis
12	DF	Sergi	28 December 1971 (aged 28)	44	(Spain) Barcelona
13	GK	Iker Casillas	20 May 1981 (aged 19)	1	(Spain) Real Madrid
14	MF	Gerard	12 March 1979 (aged 21)	0	(Spain) Valencia
15	MF	Vicente Engonga	20 October 1965 (aged 34)	13	(Spain) Mallorca
16	MF	Gaizka Mendieta	27 March 1974 (aged 26)	13	(Spain) Valencia
17	FW	Joseba Etxeberria	5 September 1977 (aged 22)	26	(Spain) Athletic Bilbao
18	DF	Paco Jémez	18 April 1970 (aged 30)	12	(Spain) Zaragoza
19	DF	Juan Velasco	17 May 1977 (aged 23)	3	(Spain) Celta Vigo
20	FW	Ismael Urzaiz	7 October 1971 (aged 28)	16	(Spain) Athletic Bilbao
21	MF	Juan Carlos Valerón	17 June 1975 (aged 24)	9	(Spain) Atlético Madrid
22	GK	José Molina	8 August 1970 (aged 29)	8	(Spain) Atlético Madrid

== Group D ==
=== Czech Republic ===
Manager: Jozef Chovanec

No.	Pos.	Player	Date of birth (age)	Caps	Club
1	GK	Pavel Srníček	10 March 1968 (aged 32)	32	(England) Sheffield Wednesday
2	DF	Tomáš Řepka	2 January 1974 (aged 26)	37	(Italy) Fiorentina
3	MF	Radoslav Látal	6 January 1970 (aged 30)	55	(Germany) Schalke 04
4	MF	Pavel Nedvěd	30 August 1972 (aged 27)	44	(Italy) Lazio
5	DF	Milan Fukal	16 May 1975 (aged 25)	4	(Czech Republic) Sparta Prague
6	DF	Petr Vlček	18 October 1973 (aged 26)	15	(Czech Republic) Slavia Prague
7	MF	Jiří Němec (captain)	15 May 1966 (aged 34)	80	(Germany) Schalke 04
8	MF	Karel Poborský	30 March 1972 (aged 28)	56	(Portugal) Benfica
9	FW	Pavel Kuka	19 July 1968 (aged 31)	77	(Germany) VfB Stuttgart
10	FW	Jan Koller	30 March 1973 (aged 27)	15	(Belgium) Anderlecht
11	MF	Tomáš Rosický	4 October 1980 (aged 19)	2	(Czech Republic) Sparta Prague
12	FW	Vratislav Lokvenc	27 September 1973 (aged 26)	30	(Czech Republic) Sparta Prague
13	MF	Radek Bejbl	29 August 1972 (aged 27)	48	(Spain) Atlético Madrid
14	MF	Pavel Horváth	22 April 1975 (aged 25)	8	(Czech Republic) Slavia Prague
15	DF	Marek Jankulovski	9 May 1977 (aged 23)	1	(Czech Republic) Baník Ostrava
16	GK	Ladislav Maier	4 January 1966 (aged 34)	6	(Austria) Rapid Wien
17	FW	Vladimír Šmicer	24 May 1973 (aged 27)	42	(England) Liverpool
18	DF	Jiří Novotný	7 April 1970 (aged 30)	24	(Czech Republic) Sparta Prague
19	DF	Karel Rada	2 March 1971 (aged 29)	43	(Czech Republic) Slavia Prague
20	MF	Patrik Berger	10 November 1973 (aged 26)	39	(England) Liverpool
21	DF	Petr Gabriel	17 May 1973 (aged 27)	8	(Czech Republic) Sparta Prague
22	GK	Jaromír Blažek	29 December 1972 (aged 27)	0	(Czech Republic) Sparta Prague

=== Denmark ===
Manager: (Sweden) Bo Johansson

No.	Pos.	Player	Date of birth (age)	Caps	Club
1	GK	Peter Schmeichel (captain)	18 November 1963 (aged 36)	122	(Portugal) Sporting CP
2	DF	Michael Schjønberg	19 January 1967 (aged 33)	42	(Germany) 1. FC Kaiserslautern
3	DF	René Henriksen	27 August 1969 (aged 30)	18	(Greece) Panathinaikos
4	DF	Jes Høgh	7 May 1966 (aged 34)	57	(England) Chelsea
5	DF	Jan Heintze	17 August 1963 (aged 36)	63	(Netherlands) PSV Eindhoven
6	DF	Thomas Helveg	24 June 1971 (aged 28)	50	(Italy) AC Milan
7	MF	Allan Nielsen	13 March 1971 (aged 29)	34	(England) Tottenham Hotspur
8	FW	Jesper Grønkjær	12 August 1977 (aged 22)	10	(Netherlands) Ajax
9	FW	Jon Dahl Tomasson	29 August 1976 (aged 23)	19	(Netherlands) Feyenoord
10	MF	Martin Jørgensen	6 October 1975 (aged 24)	24	(Italy) Udinese
11	FW	Ebbe Sand	19 July 1972 (aged 27)	25	(Germany) Schalke 04
12	DF	Søren Colding	2 September 1972 (aged 27)	24	(Denmark) Brøndby
13	DF	Martin Laursen	26 July 1977 (aged 22)	3	(Italy) Hellas Verona
14	MF	Brian Steen Nielsen	28 December 1968 (aged 31)	50	(Denmark) AB
15	MF	Stig Tøfting	14 August 1969 (aged 30)	20	(Germany) MSV Duisburg
16	GK	Thomas Sørensen	12 June 1976 (aged 23)	1	(England) Sunderland
17	MF	Bjarne Goldbæk	6 October 1968 (aged 31)	23	(England) Fulham
18	FW	Miklos Molnar	10 April 1970 (aged 30)	17	(United States) Kansas City Wizards
19	MF	Morten Bisgaard	25 June 1974 (aged 25)	4	(Italy) Udinese
20	MF	Thomas Gravesen	11 March 1976 (aged 24)	7	(Germany) Hamburger SV
21	FW	Mikkel Beck	12 May 1973 (aged 27)	18	(Denmark) AaB
22	GK	Peter Kjær	5 November 1965 (aged 34)	0	(Denmark) Silkeborg

=== France ===
Manager: Roger Lemerre

No.	Pos.	Player	Date of birth (age)	Caps	Club
1	GK	Bernard Lama	7 April 1963 (aged 37)	42	(France) Paris Saint-Germain
2	DF	Vincent Candela	24 October 1973 (aged 26)	21	(Italy) Roma
3	DF	Bixente Lizarazu	9 December 1969 (aged 30)	55	(Germany) Bayern Munich
4	MF	Patrick Vieira	23 June 1976 (aged 23)	25	(England) Arsenal
5	DF	Laurent Blanc	19 November 1965 (aged 34)	91	(Italy) Inter Milan
6	MF	Youri Djorkaeff	9 March 1968 (aged 32)	63	(Germany) 1. FC Kaiserslautern
7	MF	Didier Deschamps (captain)	15 October 1968 (aged 31)	96	(England) Chelsea
8	DF	Marcel Desailly	7 September 1968 (aged 31)	67	(England) Chelsea
9	FW	Nicolas Anelka	14 March 1979 (aged 21)	12	(Spain) Real Madrid
10	MF	Zinedine Zidane	23 June 1972 (aged 27)	55	(Italy) Juventus
11	MF	Robert Pires	29 October 1973 (aged 26)	35	(France) Marseille
12	FW	Thierry Henry	17 August 1977 (aged 22)	17	(England) Arsenal
13	FW	Sylvain Wiltord	10 May 1974 (aged 26)	14	(France) Bordeaux
14	MF	Johan Micoud	24 July 1973 (aged 26)	6	(France) Bordeaux
15	DF	Lilian Thuram	1 January 1972 (aged 28)	58	(Italy) Parma
16	GK	Fabien Barthez	28 June 1971 (aged 28)	34	(France) Monaco
17	MF	Emmanuel Petit	22 September 1970 (aged 29)	39	(England) Arsenal
18	DF	Frank Lebœuf	22 January 1968 (aged 32)	29	(England) Chelsea
19	MF	Christian Karembeu	3 December 1970 (aged 29)	43	(Spain) Real Madrid
20	FW	David Trezeguet	15 October 1977 (aged 22)	18	(France) Monaco
21	FW	Christophe Dugarry	24 March 1972 (aged 28)	39	(France) Bordeaux
22	GK	Ulrich Ramé	19 September 1972 (aged 27)	2	(France) Bordeaux

=== Netherlands ===
Manager: Frank Rijkaard

No.	Pos.	Player	Date of birth (age)	Caps	Club
1	GK	Edwin van der Sar	29 October 1970 (aged 29)	48	(Italy) Juventus
2	DF	Michael Reiziger	3 May 1973 (aged 27)	41	(Spain) Barcelona
3	DF	Jaap Stam	17 July 1972 (aged 27)	33	(England) Manchester United
4	DF	Frank de Boer (captain)	15 May 1970 (aged 30)	77	(Spain) Barcelona
5	MF	Boudewijn Zenden	15 August 1976 (aged 23)	22	(Spain) Barcelona
6	MF	Clarence Seedorf	1 April 1976 (aged 24)	49	(Italy) Inter Milan
7	MF	Phillip Cocu	29 October 1970 (aged 29)	42	(Spain) Barcelona
8	MF	Edgar Davids	13 March 1973 (aged 27)	30	(Italy) Juventus
9	FW	Patrick Kluivert	1 July 1976 (aged 23)	42	(Spain) Barcelona
10	FW	Dennis Bergkamp	10 May 1969 (aged 31)	75	(England) Arsenal
11	MF	Marc Overmars	29 March 1973 (aged 27)	56	(England) Arsenal
12	DF	Giovanni van Bronckhorst	5 February 1975 (aged 25)	17	(Scotland) Rangers
13	DF	Bert Konterman	14 January 1971 (aged 29)	10	(Netherlands) Feyenoord
14	FW	Peter van Vossen	21 April 1968 (aged 32)	29	(Netherlands) Feyenoord
15	MF	Paul Bosvelt	26 March 1970 (aged 30)	3	(Netherlands) Feyenoord
16	MF	Ronald de Boer	15 May 1970 (aged 30)	59	(Spain) Barcelona
17	FW	Pierre van Hooijdonk	29 November 1969 (aged 30)	20	(Netherlands) Vitesse
18	GK	Ed de Goey	20 December 1966 (aged 33)	31	(England) Chelsea
19	DF	Arthur Numan	14 December 1969 (aged 30)	38	(Scotland) Rangers
20	MF	Aron Winter	1 March 1967 (aged 33)	81	(Netherlands) Ajax
21	FW	Roy Makaay	9 March 1975 (aged 25)	6	(Spain) Deportivo La Coruña
22	GK	Sander Westerveld	23 October 1974 (aged 25)	2	(England) Liverpool
