= 2021–22 Slovenian PrvaLiga =

Slovenian PrvaLiga
- Season: 2021–22
- Dates: 16 July 2021 – 21 May 2022
- Champions: Maribor (16th title)
- Relegated: Aluminij
- Champions League: Maribor
- Europa Conference League: Koper; Olimpija Ljubljana; Mura
- Matches: 180
- Goals: 457 (2.54 per match)
- Best player: Ognjen Mudrinski
- Top goalscorer: Ognjen Mudrinski (17 goals)
- Biggest home win: Olimpija 6–0 Aluminij
- Biggest away win: Aluminij 0–6 Celje
- Longest winning run: 6 matches Koper
- Longest unbeaten run: 10 matches Koper
- Longest winless run: 18 matches Aluminij
- Longest losing run: 7 matches Radomlje and Tabor
- Highest attendance: 9,999; Maribor 3–1 Aluminij
- Lowest attendance: 30; Olimpija 1–0 Tabor
- Total attendance: 180,364
- Average attendance: 1,019

The 2021–22 Slovenian PrvaLiga was the 31st edition of the Slovenian PrvaLiga since its establishment in 1991. The season began on 16 July 2021 and ended on 21 May 2022. Mura were the defending champions after winning their first title the previous season.

Maribor won their 16th title on the final day of the season after defeating reigning champions Mura 3–1. As winners, they qualified for the first qualifying round of the 2022–23 UEFA Champions League.

== Competition format ==
Each team played 36 matches (18 home and 18 away). Teams played four matches against each other (2 home and 2 away).

== Teams ==
Gorica were relegated after finishing last in the previous season. Radomlje were promoted from the Slovenian Second League.

=== Stadiums and locations ===
Seating capacity only; some stadiums also have standing areas.

Aluminij	Bravo	Celje	Domžale
Aluminij Sports Park	Šiška Sports Park	Stadion Z'dežele	Domžale Sports Park
Capacity: 600	Capacity: 2,308	Capacity: 13,059	Capacity: 3,100
Koper	2021–22 Slovenian PrvaLiga is located in Slovenia		Maribor
Bonifika Stadium	2021–22 Slovenian PrvaLiga is located in Slovenia		Ljudski vrt
Capacity: 4,047	2021–22 Slovenian PrvaLiga is located in Slovenia		Capacity: 11,709
Mura	Olimpija Ljubljana	Radomlje	Tabor Sežana
Fazanerija City Stadium	Stožice Stadium	Domžale Sports Park	Rajko Štolfa Stadium
Capacity: 4,506	Capacity: 16,038	Capacity: 3,100	Capacity: 1,310

=== Personnel and kits ===
Team	Manager	Captain	Kit manufacturer	Shirt sponsor
Aluminij	(Slovenia) Robert Pevnik	(Slovenia) Luka Janžekovič	Zeus Sport	Talum, Zavarovalnica Sava
Bravo	(Slovenia) Dejan Grabić	(Slovenia) Andraž Kirm	Joma	Nomago, Mastercard, Generali
Celje	(Slovenia) Simon Rožman	(Bosnia and Herzegovina) Tomislav Tomić	Nike	Cinkarna
Domžale	(Slovenia) Dejan Djuranović	(Bosnia and Herzegovina) Senijad Ibričić	Joma	Esad Mulalić s.p.
Koper	(Slovenia) Zoran Zeljković	(Slovenia) Ivica Guberac	Macron	Port of Koper
Maribor	(Slovenia) Radovan Karanović	(Brazil) Marcos Tavares	Adidas	Zavarovalnica Sava, Nova KBM, Radio City
Mura	(Slovenia) Damir Čontala	(Slovenia) Alen Kozar	Adidas	Generali
Olimpija Ljubljana	(Croatia) Robert Prosinečki	(Slovenia) Timi Max Elšnik	Nike	None
Radomlje	(Bosnia and Herzegovina) Nermin Bašić	(Slovenia) Luka Cerar	Joma	Kalcer
Tabor Sežana	(Slovenia) Dušan Kosič	(Slovenia) Erik Salkić	Erreà	CherryBox24, Involta

=== Managerial changes ===
Team	Outgoing manager	Date of vacancy	Position in table	Incoming manager	Date of appointment
Tabor Sežana	(Slovenia) Igor Božič	9 September 2021	6th	(Slovenia) Dušan Kosič	9 September 2021
Maribor	(Slovenia) Simon Rožman	20 September 2021	6th	(Slovenia) Radovan Karanović	20 September 2021
Celje	(Slovenia) Agron Šalja	24 September 2021	7th	(Slovenia) Simon Sešlar	24 September 2021
Olimpija Ljubljana	(Serbia) Savo Milošević	10 October 2021	3rd	(Croatia) Dino Skender	12 October 2021
Celje	(Slovenia) Simon Sešlar	14 December 2021	7th	(Slovenia) Simon Rožman	1 January 2022
Radomlje	(Slovenia) Rok Hanžič	28 December 2021	10th	(Bosnia and Herzegovina) Nermin Bašić	28 December 2021
Mura	(Slovenia) Ante Šimundža	28 December 2021	5th	(Slovenia) Damir Čontala	28 December 2021
Aluminij	(Slovenia) Oskar Drobne	7 March 2022	10th	(Slovenia) Robert Pevnik	7 March 2022
Olimpija Ljubljana	(Croatia) Dino Skender	20 March 2022	3rd	(Croatia) Robert Prosinečki	22 March 2022

== League table ==
Pos	Team	Pld	W	D	L	GF	GA	GD	Pts	Qualification or relegation
1	Maribor (C)	36	21	7	8	57	37	+20	70	Qualification for the Champions League first qualifying round
2	Koper	36	19	10	7	54	38	+16	67	Qualification for the Europa Conference League second qualifying round
3	Olimpija Ljubljana	36	18	8	10	53	38	+15	62	Qualification for the Europa Conference League first qualifying round
4	Mura	36	15	12	9	57	50	+7	57	Qualification for the Europa Conference League first qualifying round
5	Bravo	36	13	10	13	33	33	0	49	
6	Radomlje	36	12	10	14	47	52	−5	46	
7	Domžale	36	11	12	13	47	46	+1	45	
8	Celje	36	12	6	18	46	50	−4	42	
9	Tabor Sežana (O)	36	7	9	20	30	41	−11	30	Qualification for the relegation play-offs
10	Aluminij (R)	36	4	12	20	33	72	−39	24	Relegation to Slovenian Second League

Source: PrvaLiga
Rules for classification: 1) Points; 2) Head-to-head points; 3) Head-to-head goal difference; 4) Head-to-head goals scored; 5) Goal difference; 6) Goals scored
(C) Champions; (O) Play-off winners; (R) Relegated

== Results ==
=== First half of the season ===
Home \ Away	ALU	BRA	CEL	DOM	KOP	MAR	MUR	OLI	RAD	TAB
Aluminij		0–1	0–1	0–1	0–0	3–0	1–1	1–0	0–2	3–2
Bravo	0–0		2–1	0–1	1–2	0–2	0–0	2–0	0–0	0–2
Celje	0–0	1–0		3–1	1–3	2–3	1–0	1–1	2–0	2–2
Domžale	1–1	0–2	1–0		2–3	3–3	4–1	0–2	2–0	1–1
Koper	1–3	0–1	2–2	4–2		2–0	3–2	0–1	3–2	1–0
Maribor	3–0	1–1	2–0	3–1	2–0		1–2	0–0	1–0	2–0
Mura	3–2	1–1	1–0	1–1	0–0	3–1		1–0	4–2	0–3
Olimpija	3–1	1–1	1–0	2–1	1–3	3–1	1–0		2–3	1–0
Radomlje	2–2	0–2	3–2	0–2	1–4	1–2	2–2	1–1		0–1
Tabor	4–0	0–2	0–1	0–0	0–1	0–1	1–1	1–2	0–1	

Source: PrvaLiga
Legend: Blue = home team win; Yellow = draw; Red = away team win.

=== Second half of the season ===
Home \ Away	ALU	BRA	CEL	DOM	KOP	MAR	MUR	OLI	RAD	TAB
Aluminij		0–2	0–6	1–1	1–1	3–3	0–1	2–3	0–4	2–2
Bravo	2–1		3–0	0–2	0–0	3–1	1–2	0–0	0–3	0–1
Celje	3–2	2–0		2–1	1–2	0–1	1–3	0–2	0–0	1–0
Domžale	3–1	3–0	1–1		0–1	0–2	1–1	2–0	0–0	1–1
Koper	2–0	0–0	3–1	0–2		1–2	2–2	1–0	1–3	1–0
Maribor	3–1	1–2	1–0	1–0	1–1		1–1	1–0	0–0	2–0
Mura	3–0	2–2	3–2	3–1	1–2	1–3		3–2	0–2	1–0
Olimpija	6–0	1–0	2–4	1–1	2–2	1–0	3–3		4–1	1–0
Radomlje	1–1	2–1	2–1	3–3	0–1	1–4	3–2	0–1		0–0
Tabor	1–1	0–1	2–1	2–1	1–1	1–2	0–2	1–2	1–2	

Source: PrvaLiga
Legend: Blue = home team win; Yellow = draw; Red = away team win.

== PrvaLiga play-off ==
A two-legged play-off between the ninth-placed team from the PrvaLiga and the second-placed team from the 2021–22 Slovenian Second League was played. The winner earned a place in the 2022–23 PrvaLiga season.

26 May 2022
17:30 CEST

Tabor Sežana	3–1	Triglav Kranj
Bongongui 4'; Ndzengue 75', 80'	Report	Vipotnik 49'

Rajko Štolfa Stadium, Sežana
Attendance: 800
Referee: Matej Jug
29 May 2022
19:30 CEST

Triglav Kranj	2–5	Tabor Sežana
Matić 47' (pen.), 72'	Report	Stančič 8', 39', 51'; Ndzengue 11'; Ovsenek 86'

Stanko Mlakar Stadium, Kranj
Attendance: 800
Referee: Rade Obrenović

Tabor Sežana won 8–3 on aggregate.

== Statistics ==
=== Top scorers ===
Rank	Player	Club	Goals
1	(Serbia) Ognjen Mudrinski	Maribor	17
2	(Slovenia) Maks Barišič	Koper	13
3	(Austria) Arnel Jakupović	Domžale	12
3	(Slovenia) Mustafa Nukić	Olimpija Ljubljana	12
5	(The Gambia) Lamin Colley	Koper	10
5	(Jamaica) Kaheem Parris	Koper	10
5	(Slovenia) Dino Stančič	Tabor Sežana	10
8	(Bosnia and Herzegovina) Gedeon Guzina	Radomlje	9
8	(Slovenia) Tomi Horvat	Mura	9
10	(Bosnia and Herzegovina) Mario Kvesić	Olimpija Ljubljana	8
10	(Croatia) Tomislav Mrkonjić	Radomlje	8
10	(Nigeria) Bede Osuji	Koper	8

== See also ==
- 2021–22 Slovenian Football Cup
- 2021–22 Slovenian Second League
