= Marinko Šarkezi =

Slovenian footballer and manager

Personal information
- Full name: Marinko Šarkezi
- Date of birth: 3 May 1972 (age 54)
- Place of birth: SFR Yugoslavia
- Height: 1.87 m (6 ft 2 in)
- Position: Defender

Youth career
- Pušča
- Mura

Senior career*
| Years | Team | Apps | (Gls) |
| 1991–1992 | Mura | 39 | (7) |
| 1993–1997 | Beltinci | 123 | (5) |
| 1997–2004 | Maribor | 125 | (10) |
| 2004–2006 | UFC Jennersdorf | | |
| 2006–2008 | Limbuš-Pekre | | |

Managerial career
- 2016–2018: ŽNK Maribor
- 2019: FC Bad Radkersburg
- * Club domestic league appearances and goals

Marinko Šarkezi (born 3 May 1972) is a Slovenian retired football defender. In the Slovenian PrvaLiga, he spent seven seasons with Maribor and five seasons with Beltinci.

== Honours ==
Maribor

- Slovenian Championship: 1997–98, 1998–99, 1999–2000, 2000–01, 2001–02, 2002–03
- Slovenian Cup: 1998–99, 2003–04
