= Zoran Pavlović =

Slovenian footballer (born 1976)

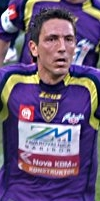
- Pavlović with Maribor in 2008

Personal information
- Date of birth: 27 June 1976 (age 50)
- Place of birth: Tuzla, SFR Yugoslavia
- Height: 1.85 m (6 ft 1 in)
- Position: Midfielder

Youth career
- Rudar Velenje

Senior career*
Years	Team	Apps	(Gls)
1993–1999	Rudar Velenje	127	(20)
1999–2001	Dinamo Zagreb	32	(3)
2001–2002	Austria Wien	20	(0)
2002	SV Salzburg	5	(0)
2003–2004	Vorskla Poltava	15	(5)
2004	Slovan Bratislava	3	(0)
2004	Opava	1	(0)
2004–2005	Olimpija	14	(1)
2005	Rot-Weiß Erfurt	3	(0)
2005–2006	Rudar Velenje	26	(5)
2006	Nafta Lendava	16	(6)
2007	Interblock	18	(1)
2008–2009	Maribor	53	(8)
2010	Drava Ptuj	8	(3)
2010–2011	Celje	34	(6)
2012-2013	SV Schwanberg	37	(21)
2013–2015	AC Linden	50	(32)
2016	GASV Pölfing-Brunn	13	(0)
2016–2019	SV Heimschuh	65	(30)
2019–2020	Šmartno 1928	8	(2)

International career
1995–1997	Slovenia U21	5	(0)
1998–2002	Slovenia	21	(0)
- * Club domestic league appearances and goals

Zoran Pavlović (born 27 June 1976) is a former Slovenian footballer who played as a midfielder.

== Club career ==
Although he was born in Tuzla, Pavlović's family moved to Velenje when he was young. He started his career at Rudar Velenje, making his first appearance in the Slovenian PrvaLiga during the 1994–95 season. Later, he played with Dinamo Zagreb, Austria Wien, Vorskla Poltava, Olimpija, Nafta Lendava, and Interblock. In the 2008–09 season, he played for and captained Maribor. After a string of poor results and a dispute with fans, he left the club in October 2009. He later signed on a combined player-sporting director contract with Drava Ptuj. He left the club in April 2010, allegedly due to a conflict surrounding the sacking of manager Milko Djurovski whom he had brought to the club only months before. In January 2012, he signed a contract as a player for Styrian amateur team SV Schwanberg.

== International career ==
Pavlović played 21 matches for the Slovenia national team and was a participant at the Euro 2000 and the 2002 FIFA World Cup. His final international was an April 2002 friendly match against Tunisia.

== Honours ==
=== Rudar Velenje ===
- Slovenian Football Cup: 1997–98

=== Dinamo Zagreb ===
- Prva HNL: 1999–2000
- Croatian Cup: 2001

=== Maribor ===
- Slovenian PrvaLiga: 2008–09
- Slovenian Supercup: 2009
