= Dino Stančič =

Slovenian footballer

Personal information
- Date of birth: 25 January 1992 (age 34)
- Place of birth: Sežana, Slovenia
- Height: 1.77 m (5 ft 10 in)
- Position: Forward

Team information
- Current team: Tabor Sežana
- Number: 25

Youth career
- –2008: Tabor Sežana
- 2008–2011: Koper

Senior career*
Years	Team	Apps	(Gls)
2010–2012	Koper	17	(3)
2011	→ Jadran Dekani (loan)		
2012	Jadran Dekani	11	(6)
2013	Krka	4	(0)
2013–2015	Tabor Sežana	31	(14)
2015–2017	Kras Repen	55	(11)
2017–2022	Tabor Sežana	132	(27)
2022–2023	FK Csíkszereda	14	(1)
2023	Clivense	7	(0)
2023–2024	Virtus Bolzano	8	(0)
2024–	Tabor Sežana	3	(0)

International career
2010	Slovenia U19	4	(2)
2011	Slovenia U20	1	(0)
- * Club domestic league appearances and goals as of 28 August 2024

Dino Stančič (born 25 January 1992) is a Slovenian footballer who plays as a forward for Tabor Sežana.

== Career ==
Stančič joined Italian Serie D side Clivense in July 2023, and transferred to Virtus Bolzano later in that year.
