= Dean Baranja =

Slovenian footballer

Personal information
- Full name: Dean Baranja
- Date of birth: 9 October 1971 (age 55)
- Position: Midfielder

Team information
- Current team: SV Eltendorf (manager)

Senior career*
Years	Team	Apps	(Gls)
1991–1997	Beltinci	173	(19)
1997–1999	Mura	62	(14)
1999–2000	DSV Leoben		
2000–2001	Mura	12	(1)
2002	Korotan Prevalje	2	(0)

Managerial career
- 2014-2015: SU Auersbach
- 2015: Sv Rb Mühldorf
- 2016: USV Siebing
- 2016-2017: USV Markt Hartmannsdorf
- 2019-2023: SK Fürstenfeld
- 2023-: SV Eltendorf
- * Club domestic league appearances and goals

Dean Baranja (born 9 October 1971) is a retired Slovenian football midfielder.

== Career ==
Baranja had a lengthy spell in Austria, first with second tier side DSV Leoben and later in the lower leagues where he also started taking up coaching duties.
