= Matej Fras =

Slovenian footballer

Personal information
- Date of birth: 3 October 1976 (age 50)
- Position: Midfielder

Senior career*
Years	Team	Apps	(Gls)
1994–2000	Mura	35	(2)
2000–2001	Beltinci	25	(7)
2001–2002	Triglav Bakovci	23	(8)
2002–2003	Križevci	5	(2)
2003–2004	UFC Jennersdorf		
2004–2005	SG Strem/Heiligenbrunn		
2005–2006	USV Neuhaus am Klausenbach		
2007–2009	SU Riegersburg/Vulkanland	50	(22)
- * Club domestic league appearances and goals

Matej Fras (born 3 October 1976) is a Slovenian retired football midfielder.
