= Renato Kotnik =

Slovenian footballer

Personal information
- Full name: Renato Kotnik
- Date of birth: 1 March 1970 (age 56)
- Place of birth: SFR Yugoslavia
- Position: Midfielder

Senior career*
Years	Team	Apps	(Gls)
1991–1995	Maribor	106	(15)
1995–1997	Korotan Prevalje	30	(0)
1997–1999	Beltinci	36	(5)
2000	FC Harreither		
2000-2001	FC Wels		
2001-2002	Ilzer SV		
2002-2003	Malečnik	20	(6)
2003-2005	UFC Jennersdorf		
2005-2006	SV Bad Schwanberg	28	(7)
- * Club domestic league appearances and goals as of 8 December 2023

Renato Kotnik (born 1 March 1970) is a Slovene retired football player, who played as a midfielder.

== Career ==
During most of his playing career Kotnik represented Maribor, Korotan and Beltinci in the Slovenian highest division, the Slovenian PrvaLiga, where he has made 172 appearances and scored 20 goals. He has spent the most time in Maribor where he has made 181 competitive appearances for the club and scored 20 goals in the process.

During the final years of his career, Kotnik played for amateur clubs in the Austrian football system. In one of those clubs, SV Schwanberg, Kotnik finished his career during the 2006–07 season.
