= Radenko Mijatović =

Slovenian footballer and administrator (born 1963)

Radenko Mijatović (born 16 November 1963) is a Slovenian football administrator and former player who is the president of the Football Association of Slovenia.

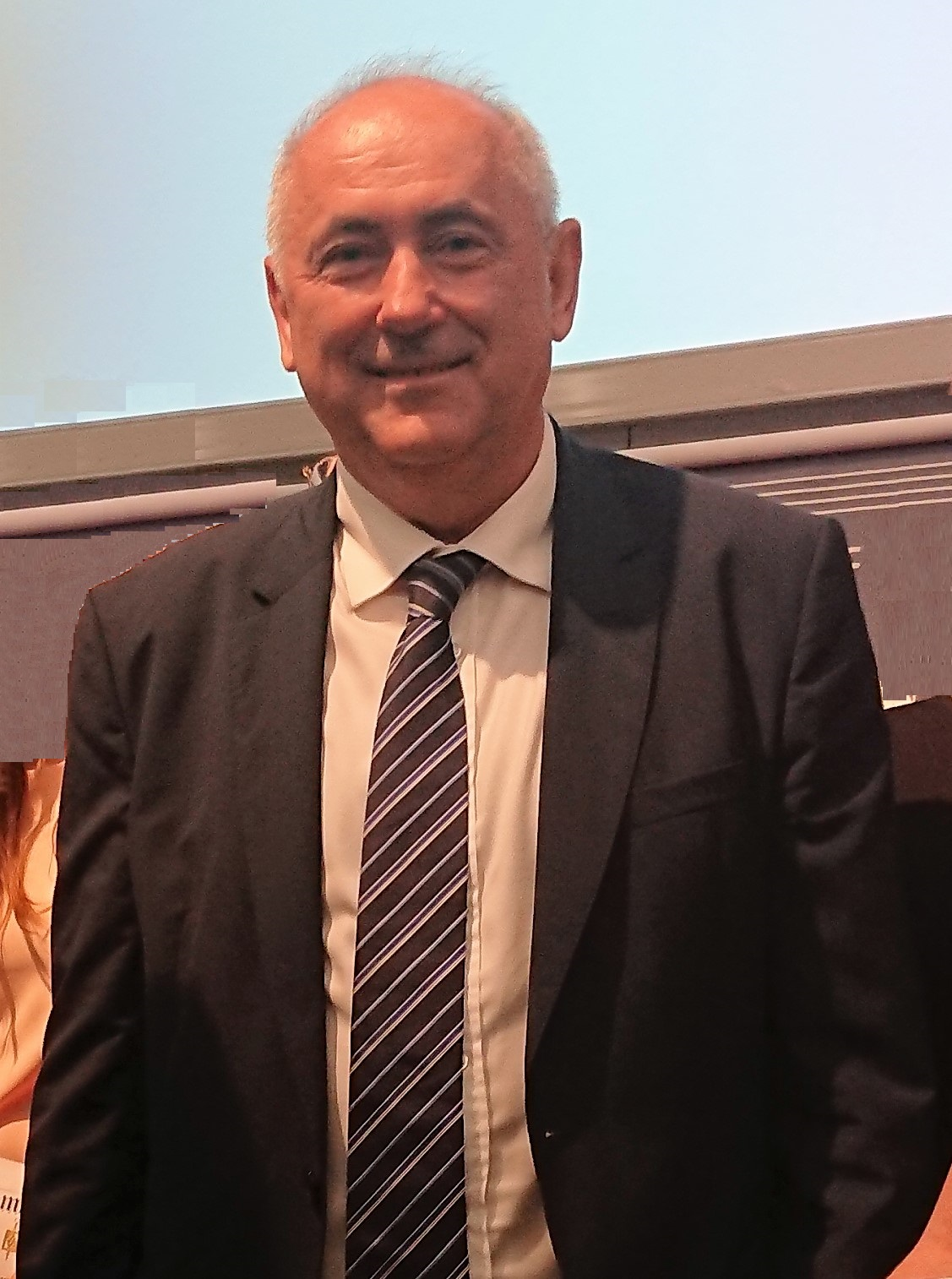
Mijatović in 2022

== Early life ==
Mijatović was born in 1963 in Kneževo, SR Bosnia and Herzegovina. He moved to Slovenia as a teenager.

== Career ==
After retiring from football, Mijatović worked as a football referee.

In 2016, Mijatović was appointed president of the Football Association of Slovenia, becoming the first president of the Football Association to not be born in Slovenia.
