= Miha Šporar =

Slovenian footballer

Personal information
- Date of birth: 31 July 1972 (age 54)
- Place of birth: SFR Yugoslavia
- Position: Centre-back

Senior career*
Years	Team	Apps	(Gls)
1991–1996	Ljubljana	114	(7)
1996–1997	Celje	29	(0)
1997–2000	Olimpija	59	(8)
2000–2001	Domžale	11	(1)
2001–2002	Bela Krajina	28	(4)
2002–2003	Grosuplje	26	(5)
2003–2004	Triglav Kranj	15	(2)
2004	Slovan		
2005–2007	Dob		
2007–2010	Olimpija Ljubljana	57	(6)
Total		385	(35)
- * Club domestic league appearances and goals

Miha Šporar (born 31 July 1972) is a Slovenian retired footballer who played as a centre-back. He played over 200 games in the Slovenian PrvaLiga.

== Personal life ==
Miha Šporar's son is Andraž Šporar who is also professional footballer. He transferred from Olimpija to Basel in December 2015.
