= Radovan Karanović =

Slovenian association football manager (born 1968)

Personal information
- Date of birth: 3 October 1968 (age 58)
- Place of birth: Drvar, SFR Yugoslavia
- Position: Midfielder

Team information
- Current team: Maribor (assistant manager)

Senior career*
Years	Team	Apps	(Gls)
- Borac Drvar
- Kabel
- Železničar Maribor
- Drava Ptuj
- SET Vevče
- Pohorje
- Kovinar Štore

Managerial career
- 2018: Krško
- 2019–2021: Beltinci
- 2021–2022: Maribor
- 2024–2025: Maribor U19
- 2025: Maribor (caretaker)
- 2026: Ilirija 1911
- 2026–: Maribor (assistant)
- * Club domestic league appearances and goals

Radovan Karanović (born 3 October 1968) is a Slovenian football manager who is the current assistant coach at Slovenian PrvaLiga club Maribor.

== Early life ==
Karanović was born in 1968 in Drvar.

== Career ==
In 2021, Karanović was appointed manager of Slovenian side NK Maribor, with whom he won the 2021–22 Slovenian PrvaLiga title, before leaving the post in August 2022 after a poor start of the new season.
