= Jozo Matovac =

Swedish footballer

Jozo Izaija Matovac
Personal information
- Full name: Jozo Izaija Matovac
- Date of birth: 22 May 1970 (age 56)
- Place of birth: Sweden
- Position: Defender

Youth career
- Gunnilse IS

Senior career*
| Years | Team | Apps | (Gls) |
| 1992–1994 | BK Häcken | | |
| 1995–1998 | Örgryte IS | | |
| 1998–2000 | Aalborg BK | | |
| 2000–2002 | Helsingborgs IF | | |

International career
| 1991 | Sweden U21 | 1 | (0) |
| 1996–1997 | Sweden B | 2 | (0) |
| 1997–2001 | Sweden | 9 | (1) |
- * Club domestic league appearances and goals

Jozo Izaija Matovac (born 22 May 1970) is a Swedish former professional footballer who played as defender. He represented BK Häcken, Örgryte IS, Aalborg BK, and Helsingborgs IF during a career that spanned between 1992 and 2002. A full international between 1997 and 2001, he won nine caps for the Sweden national team.

== Club career ==
Matovac played youth football for Gunnilse IS before signing with BK Häcken. In 1995 he signed with Örgryte IS where he was considered one of Allsvenskan's best centre backs. He signed with the Danish Superliga club Aalborg BK in 1998, before returning to Swedish football in 2000 as a replacement at Helsingborgs IF for the departed Andreas Jakobsson. In 2000, Matovac helped the team qualify for the 2000–2001 UEFA Champions League in which he participated in all six group stage games. In 2002, he retired from professional football following a hip injury.

== International career ==
Matovac made his full international debut for Sweden on 9 February 1997 in a King's Cup game against Romania in which he also scored his first international goal as Sweden won 2–0. He made his competitive international debut for Sweden in a 1998 FIFA World Cup qualifier against Estonia, playing the full 90 minutes as centre back alongside Patrik Andersson as Sweden won 1–0. He won his ninth and final cap in a 2002 FIFA World Cup qualifier against Moldova, again playing alongside Patrik Andersson at centre back.

== Personal life ==
Matovac was born in Sweden to Croatian parents.

== Career statistics ==
=== International ===
Appearances and goals by national team and year
| National team | Year | Apps | Goals |
|---|---|---|---|
| Sweden | 1997 | 3 | 1 |
| Sweden | 1998 | 1 | 0 |
| Sweden | 1999 | 0 | 0 |
| Sweden | 2000 | 0 | 0 |
| Sweden | 2001 | 5 | 0 |
| Total | | 9 | 1 |

Scores and results list Sweden's goal tally first, score column indicates score after each Matovac goal.

List of international goals scored by Jozo Matovac
| No. | Date | Venue | Opponent | Score | Result | Competition | Ref. |
|---|---|---|---|---|---|---|---|
| 1 | 9 February 1997 | National Stadium, Bangkok, Thailand | Romania | 2–0 | 2–0 | 1997 King's Cup | |

== Honours ==
Aalborg BK

- Danish Superliga: 1999–2000

Sweden

- King's Cup: 1997
