= Saša Gajser =

Slovenian footballer (born 1974)

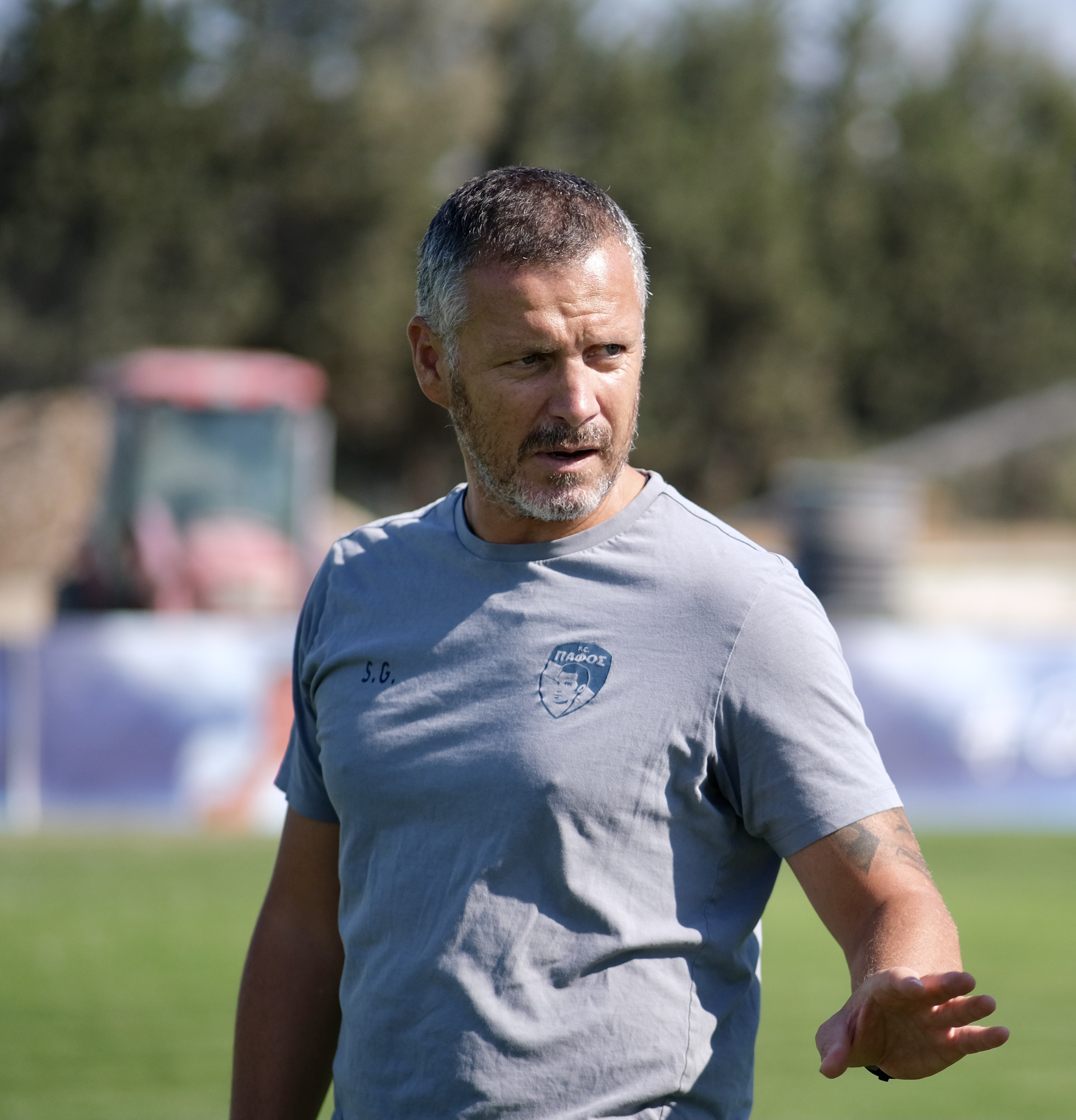

Personal information
- Date of birth: 11 February 1974 (age 52)
- Place of birth: Ptuj, SFR Yugoslavia
- Height: 1.79 m (5 ft 10 in)
- Position: Left midfielder

Youth career
- Aluminij

Senior career*
Years	Team	Apps	(Gls)
1992–1994	Maribor	17	(1)
1994–1995	Drava Ptuj		
1995–1996	Železničar Ljubljana		
1996–1997	Beltinci	29	(2)
1997–1999	Rudar Velenje	64	(6)
1999–2002	KAA Gent	76	(4)
2002–2003	Olympiakos Nicosia	21	(3)

International career
1999–2003	Slovenia	27	(1)

Managerial career
- 2011–2021: Maribor (assistant)
- 2015: Maribor (interim)
- 2020: Maribor (interim)
- 2021: Maribor (interim)
- 2024: Drava Ptuj
- 2025–2026: Rudar Velenje
- * Club domestic league appearances and goals

Saša Gajser (born 11 February 1974) is a Slovenian professional football manager and former player who played as a midfielder. He was internationally capped for Slovenia, earning 27 appearances between 1999 and 2003.

== Club career ==
Gajser started his professional career with Maribor in 1992. He stayed there for three seasons, making 22 appearances in all competitions. Later, he had spells with the second division sides Drava Ptuj and Ljubljana. After a season at Beltinci, he signed with Rudar Velenje. He stayed there for two seasons, appearing in 64 league matches and scoring 6 goals before leaving for KAA Gent. After three seasons in Belgium, he moved to Olympiakos Nicosia.

== International career ==
Gajser made his debut for Slovenia in a February 1999 friendly match against Switzerland in Oman. He earned a total of 27 caps until his final match in 2003. With Slovenia, Gajser played at the 2000 UEFA European Football Championship and the 2002 FIFA World Cup.

== Career statistics ==
=== International ===
Scores and results list Slovenia's goal tally first, score column indicates score after each Gajser goal.

List of international goals scored by Saša Gajser
No.	Date	Venue	Opponent	Score	Result	Competition
1	8 February 1999	Sultan Qaboos Sports Complex, Muscat, Oman	Oman	2–0	7–0	Friendly

== Honours ==
Maribor

- Slovenian Cup: 1991–92, 1993–94

Rudar Velenje

- Slovenian Cup: 1997–98
