= Jochen Janssen =

Belgian footballer

Personal information
- Date of birth: 22 January 1976 (age 50)
- Place of birth: Hasselt
- Position: Forward

Senior career*
Years	Team	Apps	(Gls)
1994–1995	KVV Overpelt Fabriek		
1995–1997	K.F.C. Lommel S.K.		
1997–1999	K.V.C. Westerlo		
1999–2001	Club Brugge KV		
2001	FK Austria Wien		
2001–2006	RKC Waalwijk		
2003–2004	→ Sint-Truidense V.V.		
2005	→ FC Den Bosch		
2007–2008	KVSK United		
- * Club domestic league appearances and goals

Jochen Janssen (born 22 January 1976) is a retired Belgian football striker.
