= Football Association of Slovenia =

Governing body of association football in Slovenia

UEFA
- Founded: 24 April 1920
- Headquarters: Predoslje
- FIFA affiliation: 3 July 1992
- UEFA affiliation: 24 June 1992
- President: Radenko Mijatović
- Website: https://www.nzs.si/

The Football Association of Slovenia (Slovene: Nogometna zveza Slovenije or NZS) is the governing body of football in Slovenia. It organizes the first division (1. SNL), second division (2. SNL), third division (East and West), Slovenian Cup, Slovenian Women's League, and other competitions. It is also responsible for the Slovenia national football team and the Slovenia women's national football team. It was founded as Ljubljana Football Subassociation on 24 April 1920.

== History ==
The Football Association of Slovenia has originated from the Ljubljana Football Association, which was founded on 24 April 1920 as a subnational football association under the Football Association of Yugoslavia in the Kingdom of Serbs, Croats and Slovenes. The association assumed its current name in 1948, where the Football Association of Yugoslavia granted them jurisdiction over local referees and coaches.

Following the independence of Slovenia from the Socialist Federal Republic of Yugoslavia in 1991, the Football Association of Slovenia arranged the Slovenian PrvaLiga, consisting of the Slovenian teams that played within the top three leagues of the former Yugoslav football league system. They were granted membership of FIFA in 1992 and UEFA in 1993. The Football Association of Slovenia oversaw a rise in football participation and this led to the Slovenia national football team qualifying for UEFA Euro 2000. In 2011, Aleksander Čeferin became the president of the Football Association of Slovenia but was appointed as the head of UEFA in 2016.

In 2023, the Football Association of Slovenia received a complaint from the Slovenia women's national football team that they were being treated poorly with substandard facilities to train at, poor catering provided and unprofessional behaviour from the coaching staff. The Football Association of Slovenia responded by replacing the technical staff and agreed to give them equal pay and conditions with the men's team.

== Presidents ==
- Rudi Zavrl (1989–2009)
- Ivan Simič (2009–2010)
- Aleksander Čeferin (2011–2016)
- Radenko Mijatović (2016–present)
