= Patrik Ipavec =

Slovenian footballer (born 1977)

Personal information
- Full name: Patrik Ipavec
- Date of birth: 13 July 1977 (age 49)
- Place of birth: Piran, SFR Yugoslavia
- Height: 1.81 m (5 ft 11 in)
- Position: Striker

Senior career*
Years	Team	Apps	(Gls)
1996–1997	Koper	31	(4)
1997–1998	Primorje	33	(12)
1998	Vorwärts Steyr	11	(2)
1999	Olimpija	8	(0)
1999–2001	Gorica	59	(18)
2001	Olimpija	2	(0)
2002–2003	Koper	32	(9)
2003–2004	Mura	40	(11)
2005–2006	Enosis Neon Paralimni	32	(9)
2006–2008	Ethnikos Achnas	32	(2)
2009	Koper	30	(6)
2010	Ivančna Gorica	11	(4)
2011	SV Sachsenburg	11	(3)
2011–2017	Portorož Piran		

International career
1998	Slovenia	2	(0)
- * Club domestic league appearances and goals as of 17 July 2011

Patrik Ipavec (born 13 July 1977) is a Slovenian retired footballer.

== International career ==
Ipavec made his debut for Slovenia in a February 1998 friendly match against Slovakia, coming on as a 58th-minute substitute for Mladen Rudonja. His second and final international was three days later against Cyprus.
