= Ismet Ekmečić =

Slovenian footballer

Personal information
- Full name: Ismet Ekmečić
- Date of birth: 2 February 1969 (age 57)
- Place of birth: Velenje, SFR Yugoslavia
- Height: 1.86 m (6 ft 1 in)
- Position: Forward

Senior career*
Years	Team	Apps	(Gls)
1989–1990	Rudar Ljubija	10	(0)
1993–1994	Zadar	23	(2)
1995–1997	Rudar Velenje	70	(30)
1997–1999	Olimpija	65	(32)
2000	Maribor	25	(11)
2001	Zagorje	11	(3)
2001–2003	Gorica	39	(17)
2003–2004	Rudar Velenje	31	(30)
2004	Šmartno ob Paki	13	(8)
2005–2006	USV Ragnitz	27	(24)
2007	FC Weißkirchen	9	(2)
2007	Dravinja		
- * Club domestic league appearances and goals

Ismet Ekmečić (born 2 February 1969) is a Slovenian retired footballer who played as a forward.

While playing for Olimpija, Ekmečić was the top scorer of the 1997–98 Slovenian PrvaLiga season with 21 goals. He later had a spell in the Austrian lower leagues.
