= Edi Bajrektarevič =

Slovenian footballer

Personal information
- Date of birth: 15 January 1970 (age 56)
- Place of birth: SFR Yugoslavia
- Height: 1.86 m (6 ft 1 in)
- Position: Defender

Senior career*
Years	Team	Apps	(Gls)
1993–1996	Publikum Celje	61	(9)
1996–1997	Primorje	29	(5)
1997	SET Vevče	13	(0)
1998–1999	HIT Gorica	42	(3)
1999–2000	Olimpija	16	(1)
2001	Tabor Sežana	10	(0)
2001	Korotan Prevalje	7	(0)
2002	Ljubljana	10	(2)
2002–2005	Ivančna Gorica	57	(2)
2006–2008	Olimpija	35	(3)
Total		280	(25)

International career
1999	Slovenia	1	(0)
- * Club domestic league appearances and goals

Edi Bajrektarevič (born 15 January 1970) is a Slovenian retired international footballer who played as a defender.

== Career ==
Bajrektarevič was capped once by the Slovenian national team, in a 1999 European Championshio qualification match against Greece.
