= 1996 Slovenian Supercup =

- Event: 1996 Slovenian Supercup
Gorica	Olimpija
3	1
- Date: 31 July 1996
- Venue: Sports Park, Nova Gorica
- Referee: Silvo Borošak
- Attendance: 1,500

The Slovenian Supercup 1996 was a football match that saw the 1995–96 PrvaLiga champions, Gorica, face off against the 1995–96 Slovenian Cup winners, Olimpija. The match was held on 31 July 1996 at the Sports Park in Nova Gorica.

== Match details ==
31 July 1996
17:30 CEST

Gorica	3–1	Olimpija
Srebrnič 41', 49', 79'		Djuranović 42'

Sports Park, Nova Gorica
Attendance: 1,500
Referee: Silvo Borošak

Gorica	Olimpija Ljubljana

Gorica:
GK	12	(Slovenia) Robert Volk
DF	6	(Slovenia) Miran Srebrnič (c)
DF	28	(Slovenia) Andrej Poljšak
DF	24	(Croatia) Ivica Cvitkušič	Substituted off
MF	26	(Slovenia) Alfred Jermaniš
MF	7	(Bosnia and Herzegovina) Enes Demirović	Substituted off
MF	10	(Slovenia) Vili Bečaj
MF	27	(Slovenia) Elvis Ribarič
MF	19	(Slovenia) Mladen Rudonja
CF	11	(Slovenia) Milan Osterc	Substituted off
CF	16	(Slovenia) Stanislav Komočar
Substitutes:
DF	13	(Slovenia) Željko Mitrakovič	Substituted in
MF	14	(Slovenia) Nenad Protega	Substituted in
FW	25	(Slovenia) Zoran Ubavič	Substituted in
Manager:
(Slovenia) Milan Miklavič

Olimpija:
GK	1	(Slovenia) Nihad Pejković (c)
DF	22	(Slovenia) Erik Kržišnik
DF	7	(Slovenia) Safet Hadžić	Substituted off
DF	4	(Slovenia) Samir Zulič
DF	5	(Slovenia) Aleksander Knavs
MF	19	(Federal Republic of Yugoslavia) Enver Adrović
MF	17	(Slovenia) Igor Benedejčič	Substituted off
MF	8	(Slovenia) Damjan Gajser
MF	18	(Slovenia) Dejan Djuranovič
MF	20	(Slovenia) Milenko Ačimovič	Substituted off
FW	14	(Slovenia) Sebastjan Cimirotič
Substitutes:
MF	4	(Slovenia) Dušan Kosič	Substituted in
FW	11	(Slovenia) Ermin Rakovič	Substituted in
FW	10	(Albania) Kliton Bozgo	Substituted in
Manager:
(Croatia) Petar Nadoveza
