= 1992–93 Slovenian Football Cup =

Tournament details
- Country: Slovenia
- Teams: 32

Final positions
- Champions: Olimpija (1st title)
- Runners-up: Celje

Tournament statistics
- Matches played: 31
- Goals scored: 105 (3.39 per match)

The 1992–93 Slovenian Football Cup was the second season of the Slovenian Football Cup, Slovenia's football knockout competition.

== Qualified clubs ==
=== 1992–93 Slovenian PrvaLiga members ===
- Beltinci
- Celje
- Gorica
- Izola
- Koper
- Krka
- Ljubljana
- Maribor
- Mura
- Nafta Lendava
- Naklo
- Olimpija
- Rudar Velenje
- Slovan
- Steklar
- Svoboda
- Zagorje
- Železničar Maribor

=== Qualified through MNZ Regional Cups ===
- MNZ Ljubljana: Domžale, Belinka
- MNZ Maribor: Limbuš Pekre, Korotan Prevalje
- MNZ Celje: Žalec
- MNZ Koper: Piran
- MNZ Nova Gorica: Primorje
- MNZ Murska Sobota: Radgona, Čarda
- MNZ Lendava: Turnišče
- MNZG-Kranj: Triglav Kranj, Kranj
- MNZ Ptuj: Drava Ptuj, Podvinci

== First round ==
The first round matches took place on 4 November 1992.

Team 1	Score	Team 2
Maribor	4–2	Žalec
Limbuš Pekre	1–0	Podvinci
Piran	1–0	Železničar Maribor
Celje	3–0	Mura
Drava Ptuj	2–5	Naklo
Zagorje	2–0	Beltinci
Gorica	1–1 (6–7 p)	Slovan
Domžale	1–1 (3–1 p)	Rudar Velenje
Korotan Prevalje	1–4	Nafta Lendava
Ljubljana	4–0	Turnišče
Olimpija	7–1	Kranj
Svoboda	3–0	Steklar
Čarda	0–7	Primorje
Triglav Kranj	5–0	Radgona
Izola	1–1 (3–4 p)	Studio D Novo Mesto
Belinka	0–3	Koper

== Round of 16 ==
The round of 16 matches took place on 6 December 1992.

6 December 1992	Primorje	1–0	Domžale	Vrhnika
	Mulahmetović 76'			Stadium: Usnjar Stadium; Attendance: 100; Referee: Štefan Felbar

6 December 1992	Slovan	1–1 (4–5 p)	Olimpija	Ljubljana
	Udovič 13'		Milinovič 30'	Stadium: Kodeljevo Sports Park; Attendance: 1,000; Referee: Milan Mitrovič
	Penalties
	Udovič (penalty scored); Gruškovnjak (penalty scored); Srovin (penalty scored); Gajser (penalty scored)		(penalty scored) Ubavič; (penalty scored) Podgajski; (penalty scored) Protega; (penalty scored) Milinovič; (penalty scored) Żelko

6 December 1992	Naklo	5–2	Zagorje	Kranj
	Marušič 12'; M. Pavlin 28'; Jeraj 38'; Jerina 52', 75'		Žibret 8'; Petrušič 68'	Stadium: Sports Association Field; Attendance: 500; Referee: Žarko Vidali

6 December 1992	Nafta Lendava	1–1 (2–3 p)	Celje	Lendava
	Herceg 6'		Bevc 12'	Stadium: Nafta Field; Attendance: 300; Referee: Božo Tabar
	Penalties
	Drvarič (penalty scored); Graj (penalty scored)		(penalty scored) Grobelšek; (penalty scored) Pranjič; (penalty scored) Štancar

6 December 1992	Svoboda	3–0	Piran	Ljubljana
	Čosič 63'; R. Udovič; Šiljak 88'			Stadium: Gerbičeva Sports Park; Attendance: 300; Referee: Branko Žohar

6 December 1992	Ljubljana	1–0	Maribor	Ljubljana
	Plešinac 65'			Stadium: ŽŠD Ljubljana; Attendance: 500; Referee: Vili Kranjc

6 December 1992	Triglav Kranj	6–0	Limbuš Pekre	Kranj
	Tušar 29', 38', 40'; Krnič 32'; Novkovič 46'; Goga 63'			Stadium: Kranj Sports Park; Attendance: 200; Referee: Boško Vujasin

6 December 1992	Studio D Novo Mesto	1–0	Koper	Novo Mesto
	Vrhovec 64'			Stadium: Portoval; Attendance: 1,500; Referee: Anton Beton

== Quarter-finals ==
The quarter-finals took place on 24 March 1993.

24 March 1993	Olimpija	3–1	Triglav Kranj	Ljubljana
	Zulič 8', 45'; Ubavič 68' (pen.)		Kondič 58'	Stadium: Bežigrad Stadium; Attendance: 100; Referee: Žarko Vidali

24 March 1993	Celje	3–1	Naklo	Celje
	Goršek 7', 57'; Pranjič 31'		Križaj 89'	Stadium: Skalna Klet; Attendance: 400; Referee: Darko Jamšek

24 March 1993	Primorje	0–0 (3–4 p)	Studio D Novo Mesto	Ajdovščina
				Stadium: Ajdovščina City Stadium; Attendance: 400; Referee: Anton Beton
	Penalties
	Lučić (penalty scored); Radolović (penalty scored); Mulahmetović (penalty scored)		(penalty scored) Prelogar; (penalty scored) Gliha; (penalty scored) Martinović; (penalty scored) Milanović

24 March 1993	Ljubljana	4–0	Svoboda	Ljubljana
	Ibranovič 81'; Škufca 33'; Vrabac 55'; Vidovič 58'			Stadium: ŽŠD Ljubljana; Attendance: 200; Referee: Milan Mitrovič

== Semi-finals ==
The semi-finals took place on 5 May 1993.

5 May 1993	Studio D Novo Mesto	1–4	Celje	Novo Mesto
	Oblak 40'		Beširević 60', 65', 74'; Pirc 85'	Stadium: Portoval; Attendance: 1,500; Referee: Darko Jamšek

5 May 1993	Ljubljana	0–1	Olimpija	Ljubljana
			Milinovič 39'	Stadium: ŽŠD Ljubljana; Attendance: 1,500; Referee: Zlatko Rauković

== Final ==
2 June 1993
17:00 CEST

Celje	1–2	Olimpija
Beširović 63'		Topić 42'; Djuranović 50'

Skalna Klet, Celje
Attendance: 2,500
Referee: Darko Jamšek
