= Zoran Ubavič =

Slovenian footballer

Personal information
- Date of birth: 28 October 1965
- Place of birth: Celje, Yugoslavia
- Date of death: 21 November 2015 (aged 50)
- Height: 1.80 m (5 ft 11 in)
- Position: Forward

Youth career
- Slovan

Senior career*
| Years | Team | Apps | (Gls) |
| 1983–1995 | Olimpija | | |
| 1995–1997 | Gorica | 45 | (11) |
| 1997–1998 | Vevče | 13 | (1) |
| 1998–2001 | Ljubljana | 28 | (11) |
| 2001 | Svoboda Ljubljana | 5 | (1) |
| 2002 | Livar | 2 | (0) |
| 2002–2004 | Factor | | |
| 2005–2008 | Olimpija Bežigrad | | |

International career
| 1992 | Slovenia | 1 | (0) |
- * Club domestic league appearances and goals

Zoran Ubavič (28 October 1965 – 21 November 2015) was a Slovenian footballer who played as a forward.

Ubavič spent his entire career playing for Slovenian clubs and was also capped once for the Slovenia national team, on 3 June 1992 in a friendly against Estonia in Tallinn.

He was the top scorer of the Slovenian PrvaLiga in its inaugural 1991–92 season, and is Olimpija's all-time leading goalscorer with 167 goals in 283 games across all competitions.

== Personal life ==
Born in Celje to a military officer, Ubavič suffered from severe dementia in his final years and died in 2015, aged 50.

== Honours ==
Olimpija

- Slovenian Republic League: 1986–87
- Slovenian PrvaLiga: 1991–92, 1992–93, 1993–94, 1994–95
- Slovenian Republic Cup: 1986–87
- Slovenian Cup: 1992–93

Koper

- Slovenian Republic Cup: 1990–91

Gorica

- Slovenian PrvaLiga: 1995–96
- Slovenian Supercup: 1996
