= July 3 =

July 3 this year in various calendars
- Friday, 3 July 2026
Akan	Monofie
Armenian	18 Hrotich 1475
Aztec	Tepeilhuitl 14, 6 Ehēcatl
Babylonian	17 Simanu, 2337 SE
Balinese pawukon	Luang, Pepet, Kajeng, Menala, Umanis, Maulu, Sukra of Langkir, Uma, Erangan, Pati
Bengali	19 Asharh, BS 1433
Chinese	Yang Earth Tiger・Ox Mansion; Fire Horse Year, Month 5, Day 19 (Xiazhi, 4 days until Xiaoshu)
Common Era	3 July 2026 CE
Coptic	26 Paoni, AM 1742
Egyptian	18 Athyr, 2775 NE
Ethiopian	26 Sanē, 2018 Amätä Məhrät
French Republican	Décade II, Quintidi de Messidor de l'Année 234 de la République
Gregorian	3 July, AD 2026
Hebrew	18 Tamuz, AM 5786
Hindu	Śravaṇa・Viṣkambha; Solar: 19 Āṣāḍha, 1948 SE; Lunisolar: Tr̥tīyā, Kṛishna pakṣa of Jyeṣṭha, 2083 VE; Rāudra・5127 KY・1,872,759
Icelandic	Föstudagur, 12 Sólmánuður 2026
Islamic	17 Muharram, AH 1448 (using tabular method)
ISO week date	2026-W27-5
Japanese	19 Satsuki, Reiwa 8 (Geshi, 4 days until Shōsho)
Julian	20 June, AD 2026 (AM 7534)
Julian day	2461225
Korean	19 Maldal, 4359 DE
Maya	13.0.13.13.2; 15 Tzec, 6 Ik
Roman	ante diem XII Kalendas Iulias, MMDCCLXXIX AUC
Solar Hijri	12 Tir, SH 1405
Tibetan	18 snron, me pho rta 2153 or 1772 or 1000

<<	July					>>
Su	Mo	Tu	We	Th	Fr	Sa
			1	2	3	4
5	6	7	8	9	10	11
12	13	14	15	16	17	18
19	20	21	22	23	24	25
26	27	28	29	30	31
2026

July 3 in recent years
2026 (Friday)
2025 (Thursday)
2024 (Wednesday)
2023 (Monday)
2022 (Sunday)
2021 (Saturday)
2020 (Friday)
2019 (Wednesday)
2018 (Tuesday)
2017 (Monday)

July 3 is the 184th day of the year (185th in leap years) in the Gregorian calendar; 181 days remain until the end of the year.

== Events ==
=== Pre-1600 ===
- 324 – Battle of Adrianople: Constantine I defeats Licinius, who flees to Byzantium.
- 987 – Hugh Capet is crowned King of France, the first of the Capetian dynasty that would rule France until the French Revolution in 1792.
- 1035 – William the Conqueror becomes the Duke of Normandy, reigning until 1087.
- 1450 – Jack Cade and his followers enter London unhindered by the government of king Henry VI.
- 1535 – Diego de Almagro leaves the recently conquered Inca capital of Cuzco to lead an expedition to Chile.

=== 1601–1900 ===
- 1608 – Québec City is founded by Samuel de Champlain.
- 1754 – French and Indian War: George Washington surrenders Fort Necessity to French forces.
- 1767 – Pitcairn Island is discovered by Midshipman Robert Pitcairn on an expeditionary voyage commanded by Philip Carteret.
- 1767 – Norway's oldest newspaper still in print, Adresseavisen, is founded and the first edition is published.
- 1775 – American Revolutionary War: George Washington takes command of the Continental Army at Cambridge, Massachusetts.
- 1778 – American Revolutionary War: The Iroquois, allied with Britain, massacre 360 Patriot soldiers during the Battle of Wyoming.
- 1814 – War of 1812: American forces capture Fort Erie from British troops in Upper Canada.
- 1819 – The Bank for Savings in the City of New-York, the first savings bank in the United States, opens.
- 1839 – The first state normal school in the United States, the forerunner to today's Framingham State University, opens in Lexington, Massachusetts with three students.
- 1848 – Governor-General Peter von Scholten emancipates all remaining slaves in the Danish West Indies.
- 1849 – France invades the Roman Republic and restores the Papal States.
- 1852 – Congress establishes the United States' 2nd mint in San Francisco.
- 1863 – American Civil War: The final day of the Battle of Gettysburg culminates with Pickett's Charge.
- 1866 – Austro-Prussian War is decided at the Battle of Königgrätz, enabling Prussia to exclude Austria from German affairs.
- 1884 – Dow Jones & Company publishes its first stock average.
- 1886 – Karl Benz officially unveils the Benz Patent-Motorwagen, the first purpose-built automobile.
- 1886 – The New-York Tribune becomes the first newspaper to use a linotype machine, eliminating typesetting by hand.
- 1890 – Idaho is admitted as the 43rd U.S. state.
- 1898 – A Spanish squadron, led by Pascual Cervera y Topete, is defeated by an American squadron under William T. Sampson in the Battle of Santiago de Cuba.

=== 1901–present ===
- 1908 – Start of the Young Turk Revolution in the Ottoman Empire, forcing Sultan Abdul Hamid II leads to restore the Constitution of 1876 and reconvene the parliament.
- 1913 – Confederate veterans at the Great Reunion of 1913 reenact Pickett's Charge; upon reaching the high-water mark of the Confederacy they are met by the outstretched hands of friendship from Union survivors.
- 1938 – World speed record for a steam locomotive is set in England, by the Mallard, which reaches a speed of 125.88 miles per hour (202.58 km/h).
- 1938 – United States President Franklin D. Roosevelt dedicates the Eternal Light Peace Memorial and lights the eternal flame at Gettysburg Battlefield.
- 1940 – World War II: The Royal Navy attacks the French naval squadron in Algeria, to ensure that it will not fall under German control. Of the four French battleships present, one is sunk, two are damaged, and one escapes back to France.
- 1944 – World War II: The Minsk Offensive clears German troops from the city.
- 1952 – The Constitution of Puerto Rico is approved by the United States Congress.
- 1952 – The SS United States sets sail on her maiden voyage to Southampton. During the voyage, the ship takes the Blue Riband away from the RMS Queen Mary.
- 1967 – The Aden Emergency: The Battle of the Crater in which the British Argyll and Sutherland Highlanders retake the Crater district following the Arab Police mutiny.
- 1970 – The Troubles: The "Falls Curfew" begins in Belfast, Northern Ireland.
- 1970 – Dan-Air Flight 1903 crashes into the Les Agudes mountain in the Montseny Massif near the village of Arbúcies in Catalonia, Spain, killing all 112 people aboard.
- 1973 – David Bowie retires his stage persona Ziggy Stardust with the surprise announcement that it is "the last show that we'll ever do" on the last day of the Ziggy Stardust Tour.
- 1979 – U.S. President Jimmy Carter signs the first directive for secret aid to the opponents of the pro-Soviet regime in Kabul.
- 1988 – United States Navy warship USS Vincennes shoots down Iran Air Flight 655 over the Persian Gulf, killing all 290 people aboard.
- 1988 – The Fatih Sultan Mehmet Bridge in Istanbul, Turkey is completed, providing the second connection between the continents of Europe and Asia over the Bosphorus.
- 1996 – British Prime Minister John Major announced the Stone of Scone would be returned to Scotland.
- 2006 – The Valencia Metro derailment kills 41 people.
- 2013 – President of Egypt Mohamed Morsi is removed from office by the military after four days of protests all over the country calling for his resignation, to which he did not respond. The president of the Supreme Constitutional Court of Egypt, Adly Mansour, is declared acting president until further elections are held.

== Births ==
=== Pre-1600 ===
- 321 – Valentinian I, Roman emperor (died 375)
- 1423 – Louis XI, King of France (died 1483)
- 1442 – Emperor Go-Tsuchimikado of Japan (died 1500)
- 1518 – Li Shizhen, Chinese physician and mineralogist (died 1593)
- 1530 – Claude Fauchet, French historian and author (died 1601)
- 1534 – Myeongjong of Joseon, Ruler of Korea (died 1567)
- 1550 – Jacobus Gallus, Slovenian composer (died 1591)
- 1569 – Thomas Richardson, English politician and judge (died 1635)

=== 1601–1900 ===
- 1683 – Edward Young, English poet, dramatist and literary critic (Night-Thoughts) (died 1765)
- 1685 – Sir Robert Rich, 4th Baronet, English field marshal and politician (died 1768)
- 1728 – Robert Adam, Scottish-English architect, designed Culzean Castle (died 1792)
- 1738 – John Singleton Copley, American painter (died 1815)
- 1778 – Carl Ludvig Engel, German architect (died 1840)
- 1789 – Johann Friedrich Overbeck, German-Italian painter and engraver (died 1869)
- 1814 – Ferdinand Didrichsen, Danish botanist and physicist (died 1887)
- 1823 – Ahmed Vefik Pasha, Greek-Ottoman statesman, diplomat, playwright, and translator (died 1891)
- 1844 – Dankmar Adler, German-born American architect and engineer (died 1900)
- 1846 – Achilles Alferaki, Russian composer and politician, Governor of Taganrog (died 1919)
- 1851 – Charles Bannerman, English-Australian cricketer and umpire (died 1930)
- 1854 – Leoš Janáček, Czech composer and theorist (died 1928)
- 1860 – Charlotte Perkins Gilman, American sociologist and author (died 1935)
- 1866 – Albert Gottschalk, Danish painter (died 1906)
- 1869 – Svend Kornbeck, Danish actor (died 1933)
- 1870 – R. B. Bennett, Canadian lawyer and politician, 11th Prime Minister of Canada (died 1947)
- 1871 – William Henry Davies, Welsh poet and writer (died 1940)
- 1874 – Jean Collas, French rugby player and tug of war competitor (died 1928)
- 1875 – Ferdinand Sauerbruch, German surgeon and academic (died 1951)
- 1876 – Ralph Barton Perry, American philosopher and academic (died 1957)
- 1878 – George M. Cohan, American songwriter, actor, singer, and dancer (died 1942)
- 1879 – Alfred Korzybski, Polish-American mathematician, linguist, and philosopher (died 1950)
- 1880 – Carl Schuricht, Polish-German conductor (died 1967)
- 1883 – Franz Kafka, Czech-Austrian author (died 1924)
- 1885 – Anna Dickie Olesen, American politician (died 1971)
- 1886 – Raymond A. Spruance, American admiral and diplomat, United States Ambassador to the Philippines (died 1969)
- 1888 – Ramón Gómez de la Serna, Spanish author and playwright (died 1963)
- 1889 – Richard Cramer, American actor (died 1960)
- 1893 – Sándor Bortnyik, Hungarian painter and graphic designer (died 1976)
- 1896 – Doris Lloyd, English actress (died 1968)
- 1897 – Jesse Douglas, American mathematician and academic (died 1965)
- 1898 – Stefanos Stefanopoulos, Greek politician, Prime Minister of Greece (died 1982)
- 1900 – Alessandro Blasetti, Italian director and screenwriter (died 1987)

=== 1901–present ===
- 1901 – Ruth Crawford Seeger, American composer (died 1953)
- 1903 – Ace Bailey, Canadian ice hockey player and coach (died 1992)
- 1905 – Johnny Gibson, American hurdler and coach (died 2006)
- 1905 – Harald Kihle, Norwegian painter and illustrator (died 1997)
- 1906 – George Sanders, Russian-born British actor (died 1972)
- 1908 – M. F. K. Fisher, American author (died 1992)
- 1908 – Robert B. Meyner, American lawyer and politician, 44th Governor of New Jersey (died 1990)
- 1909 – Stavros Niarchos, Greek shipping magnate (died 1996)
- 1910 – Fritz Kasparek, Austrian mountaineer (died 1954)
- 1911 – Joe Hardstaff Jr., English cricketer (died 1990)
- 1913 – Dorothy Kilgallen, American journalist, actress, and author (died 1965)
- 1916 – John Kundla, American basketball player and coach (died 2017)
- 1917 – João Saldanha, Brazilian footballer, manager, and journalist (died 1990)
- 1918 – S. V. Ranga Rao, Indian actor, director, and producer (died 1974)
- 1918 – Johnny Palmer, American golfer (died 2006)
- 1919 – Cecil FitzMaurice, 8th Earl of Orkney (died 1998)
- 1919 – Gerald W. Thomas, American soldier and academic (died 2013)
- 1920 – Eddy Paape, Belgian illustrator (died 2012)
- 1920 – Paul O'Dea, American baseball player and manager (died 1978)
- 1920 – Lennart Bladh, Swedish politician (died 2006)
- 1921 – Flor María Chalbaud, First Lady of Venezuela (died 2013)
- 1921 – Susan Peters, American actress (died 1952)
- 1921 – François Reichenbach, French director, producer, and screenwriter (died 1993)
- 1922 – Guillaume Cornelis van Beverloo, Belgian painter and sculptor (died 2010)
- 1922 – Theo Brokmann Jr., Dutch football player (died 2003)
- 1924 – Amalia Aguilar, Cuban-Mexican film actress and dancer (died 2021)
- 1924 – S. R. Nathan, 6th President of Singapore (died 2016)
- 1925 – Terry Moriarty, Australian rules footballer (died 2011)
- 1925 – Danny Nardico, American professional boxer (died 2010)
- 1925 – Philip Jamison, American artist (died 2021)
- 1926 – Johnny Coles, American trumpet player (died 1997)
- 1926 – Rae Allen, American actress, singer, and director (died 2022)
- 1926 – Laurence Street, Australian jurist and former Chief Justice of the Supreme Court of New South Wales (died 2018)
- 1927 – Ken Russell, English actor, director, and producer (died 2011)
- 1927 – Tim O'Connor, American actor (died 2018)
- 1928 – Evelyn Anthony, English author (died 2018)
- 1929 – Clément Perron, Canadian director, producer, and screenwriter (died 1999)
- 1929 – Joanne Herring, American socialite, businesswoman, political activist, philanthropist, diplomat, and television talk show host
- 1930 – Pete Fountain, American clarinet player (died 2016)
- 1930 – Carlos Kleiber, German-Austrian conductor (died 2004)
- 1930 – Tommy Tedesco, American guitarist (died 1997)
- 1932 – Richard Mellon Scaife, American businessman (died 2014)
- 1933 – Edward Brandt, Jr., American physician and mathematician (died 2007)
- 1935 – Cheo Feliciano, Puerto Rican-American singer-songwriter (died 2014)
- 1935 – Harrison Schmitt, American geologist, astronaut, and politician. Twelfth man to walk on the moon.
- 1936 – Anthony Lester, Baron Lester of Herne Hill, English lawyer and politician (died 2020)
- 1936 – Baard Owe, Norwegian-Danish actor (died 2017)
- 1937 – Nicholas Maxwell, English philosopher and academic (died 2025)
- 1937 – Tom Stoppard, Czech-English playwright and screenwriter (died 2025)
- 1938 – Jean Aitchison, English linguist and academic
- 1938 – Rhoda Scott, American soul and jazz Hammond organist
- 1938 – Sjaak Swart, Dutch footballer
- 1939 – Brigitte Fassbaender, German soprano and director
- 1939 – László Kovács, Hungarian politician and diplomat, Hungarian Minister of Foreign Affairs
- 1939 – Coco Laboy, Puerto Rican baseball player
- 1940 – Lamar Alexander, American lawyer and politician, 5th United States Secretary of Education
- 1940 – Fontella Bass, American R&B and soul singer (died 2012)
- 1940 – Jerzy Buzek, Polish engineer and politician, 9th Prime Minister of Poland
- 1940 – Michael Cole, American actor (died 2024)
- 1940 – Lance Larson, American swimmer (died 2024)
- 1940 – César Tovar, Venezuelan baseball player (died 1994)
- 1941 – Gloria Allred, American lawyer and activist
- 1941 – Liamine Zéroual, Algerian politician, 6th President of Algeria (died 2026)
- 1942 – Kevin Johnson, Australian singer-songwriter
- 1942 – Eddy Mitchell, French singer-songwriter
- 1942 – Dr. Lonnie Smith, American jazz Hammond B-3 organist (died 2021)
- 1943 – Gary Waldhorn, British actor (died 2022)
- 1943 – Judith Durham, Australian folk-pop singer-songwriter and musician (died 2022)
- 1943 – Kurtwood Smith, American actor
- 1943 – Norman E. Thagard, American astronaut
- 1945 – Michael Martin, Baron Martin of Springburn, Scottish politician, Speaker of the House of Commons (died 2018)
- 1946 – Johnny Lee, American singer and guitarist
- 1946 – Leszek Miller, Polish political scientist and politician, 10th Prime Minister of Poland
- 1946 – Michael Shea, American author (died 2014)
- 1947 – Dave Barry, American journalist and author
- 1947 – Betty Buckley, American actress and singer
- 1947 – Mike Burton, American swimmer
- 1948 – Paul Barrere, American singer-songwriter and guitarist (died 2019)
- 1948 – Tarmo Koivisto, Finnish author and illustrator
- 1949 – Susan Penhaligon, English actress
- 1949 – John Verity, English guitarist
- 1949 – Johnnie Wilder, Jr., American singer (died 2006)
- 1949 – Bo Xilai, Chinese politician, Chinese Minister of Commerce
- 1950 – Ewen Chatfield, New Zealand cricketer
- 1950 – James Hahn, American judge and politician, 40th Mayor of Los Angeles
- 1951 – Jean-Claude Duvalier, Haitian politician, 41st President of Haiti (died 2014)
- 1951 – Richard Hadlee, New Zealand cricketer
- 1952 – Dugan Basham, American stock racing driver
- 1952 – Laura Branigan, American singer-songwriter (died 2004)
- 1952 – Lu Colombo, Italian singer
- 1952 – Andy Fraser, English singer-songwriter and bass player (died 2015)
- 1952 – Carla Olson, American singer-songwriter and music producer
- 1952 – Wasim Raja, Pakistani cricketer (died 2006)
- 1952 – Amit Kumar, Indian film playback singer, actor, director, music director and musician
- 1953 – Lotta Sollander, Swedish alpine skier
- 1954 – Les Cusworth, English rugby player
- 1955 – Claude Rajotte, Canadian radio and television host
- 1956 – Montel Williams, American talk show host and television personality
- 1957 – Poly Styrene, British musician (died 2011)
- 1958 – Matthew Fraser, Canadian-English journalist and academic
- 1958 – Charlie Higson, English actor, singer, and author
- 1958 – Siân Lloyd, Welsh meteorologist and journalist
- 1958 – Didier Mouron, Swiss-Canadian painter
- 1958 – Aaron Tippin, American singer-songwriter, guitarist, and producer
- 1959 – Julie Burchill, English journalist and author
- 1959 – Ian Maxtone-Graham, American screenwriter and producer
- 1959 – Stephen Pearcy, American singer-songwriter and guitarist
- 1959 – David Shore, Canadian screenwriter and producer
- 1960 – Vince Clarke, English singer-songwriter, keyboard player, and producer
- 1962 – Scott Borchetta, American record executive and entrepreneur
- 1962 – Tom Cruise, American actor and producer
- 1962 – Thomas Gibson, American actor and director
- 1963 – Tracey Emin, British Artist
- 1964 – Yeardley Smith, American actress, voice actress, comedian and writer
- 1965 – Shinya Hashimoto, Japanese wrestler (died 2005)
- 1965 – Connie Nielsen, Danish-American actress
- 1965 – Komsan Pohkong, Thai lawyer and academic
- 1965 – Christophe Ruer, French pentathlete (died 2007)
- 1966 – Moisés Alou, American baseball player
- 1967 – Katy Clark, Scottish lawyer and politician
- 1968 – Ramush Haradinaj, Kosovo-Albanian soldier and politician, 4th Prime Minister of Kosovo
- 1970 – Serhiy Honchar, Ukrainian cyclist
- 1970 – Audra McDonald, American actress and singer
- 1970 – Teemu Selänne, Finnish ice hockey player
- 1971 – Julian Assange, Australian journalist, publisher, and activist, founded WikiLeaks
- 1971 – Benedict Wong, English actor
- 1973 – Alvin Gajadhur, Polish politician, statesman, chemical engineer, and educator
- 1973 – Paul Rauhihi, New Zealand rugby league player
- 1973 – Ólafur Stefánsson, Icelandic handball player
- 1973 – Fyodor Tuvin, Russian footballer (died 2013)
- 1973 – Patrick Wilson, American actor
- 1975 – Matt Haig, British author and journalist
- 1976 – Wade Belak, Canadian ice hockey player (died 2011)
- 1976 – Henry Olonga, Zimbabwean cricketer and sportscaster
- 1976 – Wanderlei Silva, Brazilian-American mixed martial artist
- 1976 – Bobby Skinstad, Zimbabwean-South African rugby union player
- 1977 – David Bowens, American football player
- 1978 – Mizuki Noguchi, Japanese runner
- 1979 – Jamie Grove, English cricketer
- 1980 – Mazharul Haque, Bangladeshi cricketer (died 2013)
- 1980 – Olivia Munn, American actress and television host
- 1980 – Roland Schoeman, South African swimmer
- 1980 – Harbhajan Singh, Indian cricketer
- 1983 – Edinson Vólquez, Dominican baseball player
- 1984 – Manny Lawson, American football player
- 1984 – Churandy Martina, Dutch sprinter
- 1984 – Corey Sevier, Canadian actor and producer
- 1986 – Marco Antônio de Mattos Filho, Brazilian footballer
- 1986 – Kisenosato Yutaka, Japanese sumo wrestler
- 1987 – Sebastian Vettel, German race car driver
- 1988 – Winston Reid, New Zealand-Danish footballer
- 1988 – Vladislav Sesganov, Russian figure skater
- 1988 – James Troisi, Australian footballer
- 1989 – Danilo Cavalcante, Brazilian convicted murderer
- 1989 – Mitchell Dodds, Australian rugby league player
- 1989 – Elle King, American singer, songwriter, and actress
- 1990 – Nathan Gardner, Australian rugby league player
- 1990 – Bobby Hopkinson, English footballer
- 1990 – Lucas Mendes, Brazilian footballer
- 1990 – Alison Riske-Amritraj, American tennis player
- 1991 – Alison Howie, Scottish field hockey player
- 1991 – Anastasia Pavlyuchenkova, Russian tennis player
- 1992 – Crystal Dunn, American soccer player
- 1993 – PartyNextDoor, Canadian singer-songwriter and record producer
- 1994 – Chris Jones, American football player
- 1996 – Cole Tucker, American baseball player
- 1996 – Alex Twal, Australian-Lebanese rugby league player
- 1997 – T. J. Hockenson, American football player
- 1998 – Kim Dong-han, South Korean singer
- 1999 – Nefisa Berberović, Bosnian tennis player
- 2001 – Folarin Balogun, American soccer player
- 2001 – Promise David, Canadian soccer player

== Deaths ==
=== Pre-1600 ===
- 458 – Anatolius of Constantinople, Byzantine patriarch and saint
- 710 – Emperor Zhongzong of Tang (born 656)
- 896 – Dong Chang, Chinese warlord
- 964 – Henry I, Frankish nobleman and archbishop
- 1090 – Egbert II, Margrave of Meissen (born c. 1060)
- 1288 – Stephen de Fulbourn, English-born Irish cleric and politician
- 1503 – Pierre d'Aubusson, Grand Master of the Knights of Rhodes (born 1423)
- 1570 – Aonio Paleario, Italian academic and reformer (born 1500)

=== 1601–1900 ===
- 1642 – Marie de' Medici, French queen consort and regent (born 1573)
- 1672 – Francis Willughby, English ornithologist and ichthyologist (born 1635)
- 1790 – Jean-Baptiste L. Romé de l'Isle, French geologist and mineralogist (born 1736)
- 1795 – Louis-Georges de Bréquigny, French scholar and author (born 1714)
- 1795 – Antonio de Ulloa, Spanish general, astronomer, and politician, 1st Colonial Governor of Louisiana (born 1716)
- 1809 – Joseph Quesnel, French-Canadian composer and playwright (born 1746)
- 1863 – George Hull Ward, American general (born 1826)
- 1863 – Little Crow, American tribal leader (born 1810)
- 1881 – Hasan Tahsini, Albanian astronomer, mathematician, and philosopher (born 1811)
- 1887 – Clay Allison, American rancher (born 1841)
- 1888 – Nguyễn Đình Chiểu, Vietnamese poet and author (born 1822)

=== 1901–present ===
- 1904 – Édouard Beaupré, Canadian giant and strongman (born 1881)
- 1904 – Theodor Herzl, Austrian journalist, playwright, and father of modern political Zionism (born 1860)
- 1908 – Joel Chandler Harris, American journalist and author (born 1845)
- 1916 – Hetty Green, American businesswoman and financier (born 1834)
- 1918 – Mehmed V, Ottoman sultan (born 1844)
- 1921 – James Mitchel, Irish-American weight thrower (born 1864)
- 1927 – Gérard de Courcelles, French race car driver
- 1933 – Hipólito Yrigoyen, Argentinian educator and politician, 19th President of Argentina (born 1852)
- 1935 – André Citroën, French engineer and businessman, founded the Citroën Company (born 1878)
- 1937 – Jacob Schick, American-Canadian captain and businessman, invented the electric razor (born 1877)
- 1941 – Friedrich Akel, Estonian physician and politician, Head of State of Estonia (born 1871)
- 1954 – Siegfried Handloser, German physician and general (born 1895)
- 1954 – Reginald Marsh, French-American painter, illustrator, and academic (born 1898)
- 1957 – Dolf Luque, Cuban baseball player and manager (born 1890)
- 1957 – Richard Mohaupt, German composer and Kapellmeister (born 1904)
- 1958 – Charles Bathurst, 1st Viscount Bledisloe, English politician, 4th Governor-General of New Zealand (born 1867)
- 1969 – Brian Jones, English guitarist, songwriter, and producer (born 1942)
- 1971 – Jim Morrison, American singer-songwriter (born 1943)
- 1974 – John Crowe Ransom, American poet and critic (born 1888)
- 1977 – Alexander Volkov, Russian mathematician and author (born 1891)
- 1978 – James Daly, American actor (born 1918)
- 1979 – Louis Durey, French pianist and composer (born 1888)
- 1981 – Ross Martin, American actor and director (born 1920)
- 1985 – Frank J. Selke, Canadian ice hockey player and manager (born 1893)
- 1986 – Rudy Vallée, American singer, saxophonist, and actor (born 1901)
- 1989 – Jim Backus, American actor and voice artist (born 1913)
- 1993 – Don Drysdale, American baseball player and sportscaster (born 1936)
- 1994 – Lew Hoad, Australian tennis player and coach (born 1934)
- 1995 – Pancho Gonzales, American tennis player (born 1928)
- 1995 – Eddie Mazur, Canadian ice hockey player (born 1929)
- 1998 – Danielle Bunten Berry, American game designer and programmer (born 1949)
- 1999 – Mark Sandman, American singer-songwriter, guitarist, and producer (born 1952)
- 1999 – Pelageya Polubarinova-Kochina, Russian mathematician (born 1899)
- 2001 – Mordecai Richler, Canadian author and screenwriter (born 1931)
- 2001 – Johnny Russell, American singer-songwriter and guitarist (born 1940)
- 2004 – Andriyan Nikolayev, Russian general, pilot, and astronaut (born 1929)
- 2005 – Alberto Lattuada, Italian actor, director, and screenwriter (born 1914)
- 2005 – Gaylord Nelson, American lawyer and politician, 35th Governor of Wisconsin (born 1916)
- 2006 – Joseph Goguen, American computer scientist, developed the OBJ programming language (born 1941)
- 2007 – Boots Randolph, American saxophonist (born 1927)
- 2008 – Clive Hornby, English actor and drummer (born 1944)
- 2008 – Oliver Schroer, Canadian fiddler, composer, and producer (born 1956)
- 2009 – Alauddin Al-Azad, Bangladeshi author and poet (born 1932)
- 2009 – John Keel, American journalist and author (born 1930)
- 2010 – Abu Daoud, Palestinian terrorist, planned the Munich massacre (born 1937)
- 2011 – Ali Bahar, Bahraini singer and guitarist (born 1960)
- 2012 – Nguyễn Hữu Có, Vietnamese general and politician (born 1925)
- 2012 – Andy Griffith, American actor, singer, and producer (born 1926)
- 2012 – Yvonne B. Miller, American educator and politician (born 1934)
- 2012 – Sergio Pininfarina, Italian engineer and politician (born 1926)
- 2012 – Richard Alvin Tonry, American lawyer and politician (born 1935)
- 2013 – Roman Bengez, Slovenian footballer and manager (born 1964)
- 2013 – Francis Ray, American author (born 1944)
- 2013 – PJ Torokvei, Canadian actress and screenwriter (born 1951)
- 2013 – Radu Vasile, Romanian historian and politician, 57th Prime Minister of Romania (born 1942)
- 2013 – Bernard Vitet, French trumpet player and composer (born 1934)
- 2013 – Snoo Wilson, English playwright and screenwriter (born 1948)
- 2014 – Jini Dellaccio, American photographer (born 1917)
- 2014 – Tim Flood, Irish hurler and coach (born 1927)
- 2014 – Volkmar Groß, German footballer (born 1948)
- 2014 – Ira Ruskin, American politician (born 1943)
- 2014 – Zalman Schachter-Shalomi, Ukrainian-American rabbi and author (born 1924)
- 2015 – Diana Douglas, British-American actress (born 1923)
- 2015 – Boyd K. Packer, American religious leader and educator (born 1924)
- 2015 – Wayne Townsend, American farmer and politician (born 1926)
- 2015 – Phil Walsh, Australian footballer and coach (born 1960)
- 2020 – Saroj Khan, Indian dance choreographer (born 1948)
- 2025 – Borja Gómez, Spanish motorcycle rider (born 2005)
- 2025 – Diogo Jota, Portuguese footballer (born 1996)
- 2025 – David Mabuza, South African politician, 8th Deputy President of South Africa (born 1960)
- 2025 – Michael Madsen, American actor (born 1957)
- 2025 – Peter Rufai, Nigerian footballer (born 1963)
- 2025 – André Silva, Portuguese footballer (born 2000)
- 2025 – Lolit Solis, Filipino talent manager, columnist and talk show host (born 1947)

== Holidays and observances ==
- Christian feast day:
  - Anatolius of Constantinople
  - Anatolius of Laodicea
  - Dathus
  - Germanus of Man
  - Gurthiern
  - Heliodorus of Altino
  - Mucian
  - Peregrina Mogas Fontcuberta
  - Pope Leo II
  - Thomas the Apostle
  - July 3 (Eastern Orthodox liturgics)
- Emancipation Day (United States Virgin Islands)
- Independence Day, celebrates the liberation of Minsk from Nazi occupation by Soviet troops in 1944 (Belarus)
- The start of the Dog Days according to the Old Farmer's Almanac but not according to established meaning in most European cultures
- Women's Day (Myanmar)
