= 1993–94 Slovenian Second League =

Slovenian Second League
- Season: 1993–94
- Champions: Kočevje
- Promoted: Kočevje; Korotan Prevalje
- Relegated: Triglav Kranj; Medvode
- Matches played: 240
- Goals scored: 701 (2.92 per match)
- Top goalscorer: Milan Osterc (20 goals)

The 1993–94 Slovenian Second League season started on 22 August 1993 and ended on 12 June 1994. Each team played a total of 30 matches.

== League standing ==
Pos	Team	Pld	W	D	L	GF	GA	GD	Pts	Promotion or relegation
1	Kočevje (C, P)	30	21	5	4	63	15	+48	47	Promotion to Slovenian PrvaLiga
2	Korotan Prevalje (P)	30	19	6	5	67	29	+38	44	Promotion to Slovenian PrvaLiga
3	Turnišče	30	19	6	5	59	29	+30	44	
4	Nafta Lendava	30	18	4	8	55	27	+28	40	
5	Veržej	30	15	3	12	56	41	+15	33	
6	Šmartno	30	11	9	10	52	38	+14	31	
7	Steklar	30	11	9	10	43	35	+8	31	
8	Piran	30	12	7	11	39	36	+3	31	
9	Zagorje	30	12	7	11	50	55	−5	31	
10	Dravinja	30	11	7	12	40	34	+6	29	
11	Slavija Vevče	30	8	10	12	41	44	−3	26	
12	Domžale	30	6	13	11	28	45	−17	25	
13	Železničar Maribor (Note: 1 point deducted.)	30	10	5	15	36	50	−14	24	
14	Rudar Trbovlje	30	7	7	16	34	60	−26	20	
15	Triglav Kranj (R)	30	3	10	17	24	72	−48	16	Relegation to Slovenian Third League
16	Medvode (R)	30	0	6	24	14	91	−77	6	Relegation to Slovenian Third League

Rules for classification: 1) points; 2) goal difference; 3) number of goals scored.
(C) Champions; (P) Promoted; (R) Relegated

== See also ==
- 1993–94 Slovenian PrvaLiga
- 1993–94 Slovenian Third League
