= 1989–90 Slovenian Republic Cup =

Tournament details
- Country: SR Slovenia

Final positions
- Champions: Koper (1st title)
- Runners-up: Rudar Velenje

The 1989–90 Slovenian Republic Cup was the penultimate season of Slovenia's football knockout competition before the establishment of the Slovenian Football Cup. It was contested by all Slovenian clubs except Olimpija and played by the East/West system.

== Round of 16 ==
Team 1	Score	Team 2
East
Miklavž	3–1	Drava
Pekre Limbuš	2–4	Rudar Velenje
Središče	1–0	Mura
Nafta Lendava	4–1	Ingrad/Kladivar
West
Primorje veterans	0–4	Rudar Trbovlje
Zarica	1–5	Vozila Gorica
Koper	3–2	Lj. sodniki
Triglav Kranj	2–1	Izola

== Quarter-finals ==
Team 1	Score	Team 2
East
Rudar Velenje	4–1	Nafta Lendava
Miklavž	6–5 (pen.)	Središče
West
Vozila Gorica	0–2	Koper
Rudar Trbovlje	2–0	Triglav Kranj

== Semi-finals ==
Team 1	Score	Team 2
East
Rudar Velenje	10–3	Miklavž
West
Koper	2–0	Rudar Trbovlje

== Final ==
20 June 1990

Rudar Velenje	1–1 (a.e.t.)	Koper
Pranjić 90' (pen.)		Benedejčič 56'
Penalties
Brdžanović (penalty scored); Pranjić (penalty scored); Cvikl (penalty scored)	3–5	(penalty scored) Galič; (penalty scored) Čosić; (penalty scored) Bečaj; (penalty scored) Benedejčič; (penalty scored) Ban

Ob Jezeru Stadium, Velenje
Attendance: 400
Referee: Igor Bučar
