= Stojan Plešinac =

Slovenian footballer and coach

Personal information
- Full name: Stojan Plešinac
- Date of birth: 13 August 1960 (age 66)
- Place of birth: Postojna, SR Slovenia, SFR Yugoslavia
- Position: Midfielder

Senior career*
Years	Team	Apps	(Gls)
1981–1982	Svoboda Ljubljana	14	(1)
1983–1984	Olimpija Ljubljana	2	
1984–1985	Vozila Nova Gorica		
1986–1994	Ljubljana	92	(60)
1994–1995	Korotan Prevalje	22	(2)
1995–1996	Mengeš		

Managerial career
- 1996–1997: NK Mengeš
- 2003–2004: NK Ljubljana
- 2005–2008: FC Ljubljana
- * Club domestic league appearances and goals

Stojan Plešinac is a Slovenian football coach and former player.

He played for Slovenian clubs NK Olimpija, ND Gorica, NK Ljubljana and NK Korotan and was Slovenian league top-scorer with Ljubljana in 1988/89. He later managed NK Ljubljana in Slovenian First League and even played some matches for the club, when it was expelled to Slovenian Fifth League in 2005/06 and 2006/07 seasons.
