= 1990–91 Slovenian Republic Cup =

Tournament details
- Country: SR Slovenia

Final positions
- Champions: Koper (2nd title)
- Runners-up: Rudar Velenje

The 1990–91 Slovenian Republic Cup was the last season of Slovenia's football knockout competition before the establishment of the Slovenian Football Cup. It was contested by all Slovenian clubs except Olimpija, with Yugoslav Inter-Republic League members joining in the round of 16. From there on clubs played by the East/West system to the final.

== Round of 16 ==
Team 1	Score	Team 2
East
Bukovci	2–3	Kovinar Maribor
Ingrad/Kladivar	1–3	Beltinka
Maribor Branik	0–0 (5–6 p)	Rudar Velenje
Nafta Lendava	1–2	Središče
West
Ljubljana	1–1 (5–6 p)	Koper
Izola	9–0	Mavčiče
Živila Naklo	3–0	Lj. sodniki
Primorje	0–2	Jadran/Lama Dekani

== Quarter-finals ==
Team 1	Score	Team 2
East
Kovinar Maribor	1–1 (2–4 p)	Beltnika
Središče	1–2	Rudar Velenje
West
Jadran/Lama Dekani	3–3 (6–5 p)	Izola
Koper	3–0	Živila Naklo

== Semi-finals ==
Team 1	Score	Team 2
East
Beltnika	1–1 (1–4 p)	Rudar Velenje
West
Koper	2–1	Jadran/Lama Dekani

== Final ==
23 June 1991
17:00 CEST

Koper	3–1	Rudar Velenje
Zulič; Ubavič; Ban (pen.)		Goršek

Bonifika Stadium, Koper
Attendance: 400
Referee: Matjaž Frece
