= Kržišnik =

Kržišnik is a surname. Notable people with the surname include:

- Borut Kržišnik (born 1961), Slovenian composer
- Erik Kržišnik, Slovenian footballer
