= Zulick =

Zulick is a surname. Notable people with the surname include:

- C. Meyer Zulick (1839–1926), American jurist and politician
- Samuel Zulick (1824–1876), Union Army officer and medical doctor

== See also ==
- Zulić
- Żulice
