= 1994–95 Slovenian Second League =

Slovenian Second League
- Season: 1994–95
- Champions: Šmartno
- Relegated: Turnišče; Dravinja; Slovan; Veržej; Steklar; Elan Novo Mesto
- Matches played: 240
- Goals scored: 647 (2.7 per match)
- Top goalscorer: Tomi Druškovič (26 goals)

The 1994–95 Slovenian Second League season started on 14 August 1994 and ended on 4 June 1995. Each team played a total of 30 matches. Vevče were replaced by Radeče before the start of the season.

== League standing ==
| Pos | Team | Pld | W | D | L | GF | GA | GD | Pts | Qualification or relegation |
|---|---|---|---|---|---|---|---|---|---|---|
| 1 | Šmartno (C) | 30 | 20 | 6 | 4 | 65 | 28 | +37 | 46 | Qualification to promotion play-offs |
| 2 | Nafta Lendava | 30 | 16 | 11 | 3 | 50 | 26 | +24 | 43 | Qualification to promotion play-offs |
| 3 | Zagorje | 30 | 18 | 7 | 5 | 54 | 13 | +41 | 43 | |
| 4 | Rudar Trbovlje | 30 | 14 | 7 | 9 | 45 | 32 | +13 | 35 | |
| 5 | Radeče | 30 | 13 | 6 | 11 | 45 | 32 | +13 | 32 | |
| 6 | Drava Ptuj (Note: 1 point deducted.) | 30 | 13 | 7 | 10 | 48 | 40 | +8 | 32 | |
| 7 | Piran | 30 | 13 | 5 | 12 | 54 | 38 | +16 | 31 | |
| 8 | Mengeš | 30 | 10 | 11 | 9 | 22 | 23 | −1 | 31 | |
| 9 | Domžale | 30 | 12 | 7 | 11 | 44 | 38 | +6 | 31 | Qualification to relegation play-offs |
| 10 | Železničar Maribor | 30 | 13 | 5 | 12 | 43 | 47 | −4 | 31 | Qualification to relegation play-offs |
| 11 | Turnišče (R) | 30 | 11 | 6 | 13 | 39 | 49 | −10 | 27 | Relegation to Slovenian Third League |
| 12 | Dravinja (R) | 30 | 8 | 9 | 13 | 31 | 45 | −14 | 25 | Relegation to Slovenian Third League |
| 13 | Slovan (R) | 30 | 6 | 8 | 16 | 27 | 63 | −36 | 20 | Relegation to Slovenian Third League |
| 14 | Veržej (R) | 30 | 6 | 7 | 17 | 31 | 49 | −18 | 19 | Relegation to Slovenian Third League |
| 15 | Steklar (R) | 30 | 4 | 9 | 17 | 29 | 58 | −29 | 17 | Relegation to Slovenian Third League |
| 16 | Elan Novo Mesto (R) | 30 | 4 | 7 | 19 | 20 | 66 | −46 | 14 | Relegation to Slovenian Third League |

(C) Champions; (R) Relegated

=== Relegation play-offs ===
14 June 1995

| Šentjur | 4–2 | Železničar Maribor |

Šentjur Sports Park, Šentjur
18 June 1995

| Železničar Maribor | 1–1 | Šentjur |

Tabor Sports Park, Maribor

Šentjur won 5–3 on aggregate.

14 June 1995

| Črnuče | 2–1 | Domžale |

ŽŠD Stadium, Ljubljana
18 June 1995

| Domžale | 1–0 | Črnuče |

Sports Park, Domžale

2–2 on aggregate. Domžale won on away goals.

== See also ==
- 1994–95 Slovenian PrvaLiga
- 1994–95 Slovenian Third League
