= Zulić =

Zulić is a surname. Notable people with the surname include:

- Muhamed Zulić (1928–2008), Croatian politician
- Nina Zulić (born 1995), Slovenian handball player
- Samir Zulič (born 1966), Slovenian footballer

== See also ==
- Zulick
