= 1993–94 Slovenian Third League =

Slovenian Third League
- Season: 1993–94
- Champions: Drava Ptuj (East); Mengeš (West)
- Relegated: Ižakovci; Rače; Svoboda Kisovec; Visoko; Ilirija; Škofja Loka
- Matches: 364
- Goals: 990 (2.72 per match)

The 1993–94 Slovenian Third League was the second season of the Slovenian Third League, the third highest level in the Slovenian football system.

- Radomlje merged with Dob before the season.

== League standings ==
=== East ===
| Pos | Team | Pld | W | D | L | GF | GA | GD | Pts | Promotion or relegation |
|---|---|---|---|---|---|---|---|---|---|---|
| 1 | Drava Ptuj (C, P) | 26 | 16 | 7 | 3 | 68 | 22 | +46 | 39 | Promotion to Slovenian Second League |
| 2 | Aluminij | 26 | 14 | 6 | 6 | 59 | 35 | +24 | 34 | |
| 3 | Papirničar Radeče (P) | 26 | 12 | 9 | 5 | 42 | 21 | +21 | 33 | Promotion to Slovenian Second League |
| 4 | Dravograd | 26 | 11 | 8 | 7 | 39 | 27 | +12 | 30 | |
| 5 | Kungota | 26 | 9 | 12 | 5 | 37 | 28 | +9 | 30 | |
| 6 | Kovinar Maribor | 26 | 11 | 7 | 8 | 35 | 29 | +6 | 29 | |
| 7 | Svoboda Brežice | 26 | 8 | 9 | 9 | 32 | 38 | −6 | 25 | |
| 8 | Partizan | 26 | 9 | 6 | 11 | 30 | 36 | −6 | 24 | |
| 9 | Žalec | 26 | 7 | 9 | 10 | 25 | 35 | −10 | 23 | |
| 10 | Bistrica | 26 | 6 | 10 | 10 | 20 | 32 | −12 | 22 | |
| 11 | Pohorje | 26 | 7 | 5 | 14 | 34 | 52 | −18 | 19 | |
| 12 | Pobrežje | 26 | 5 | 8 | 13 | 26 | 50 | −24 | 18 | |
| 13 | Ižakovci (R) | 26 | 6 | 6 | 14 | 33 | 51 | −18 | 18 | Relegation to Slovenian Regional Leagues |
| 14 | Rače (R) | 26 | 8 | 4 | 14 | 31 | 54 | −23 | 14 (Note: 6 points deducted.) | Relegation to Slovenian Regional Leagues |

(C) Champions; (P) Promoted; (R) Relegated

=== West ===
| Pos | Team | Pld | W | D | L | GF | GA | GD | Pts | Promotion or relegation |
|---|---|---|---|---|---|---|---|---|---|---|
| 1 | Mengeš (C, P) | 26 | 13 | 10 | 3 | 47 | 21 | +26 | 36 | Promotion to Slovenian Second League |
| 2 | Radomlje Dob | 26 | 12 | 9 | 5 | 35 | 18 | +17 | 33 | |
| 3 | Tabor Sežana | 26 | 11 | 8 | 7 | 51 | 35 | +16 | 30 | |
| 4 | Branik Šmarje | 26 | 12 | 6 | 8 | 48 | 48 | 0 | 30 | |
| 5 | Brda | 26 | 12 | 5 | 9 | 42 | 35 | +7 | 29 | |
| 6 | Bilje | 26 | 8 | 12 | 6 | 28 | 24 | +4 | 28 | |
| 7 | Renče | 26 | 9 | 9 | 8 | 46 | 31 | +15 | 27 | |
| 8 | Korotan Šempas | 26 | 8 | 9 | 9 | 27 | 31 | −4 | 25 | |
| 9 | Arne Tabor 69 | 26 | 8 | 7 | 11 | 36 | 37 | −1 | 23 | |
| 10 | Litija | 26 | 8 | 7 | 11 | 40 | 49 | −9 | 23 | |
| 11 | Svoboda Kisovec (R) | 26 | 7 | 8 | 11 | 23 | 36 | −13 | 22 | Relegation to Slovenian Regional Leagues |
| 12 | Visoko (R) | 26 | 7 | 8 | 11 | 23 | 41 | −18 | 22 | Relegation to Slovenian Regional Leagues |
| 13 | Ilirija (R) | 26 | 6 | 8 | 12 | 18 | 34 | −16 | 20 | Relegation to Slovenian Regional Leagues |
| 14 | Škofja Loka (R) | 26 | 3 | 10 | 13 | 15 | 39 | −24 | 16 | Relegation to Slovenian Regional Leagues |

(C) Champions; (P) Promoted; (R) Relegated

== See also ==
- 1993–94 Slovenian Second League
