= 1948–49 Slovenian Republic League =

Slovenian Republic League
- Season: 1948–49
- Champions: Železničar Ljubljana
- Matches played: 56
- Goals scored: 208 (3.71 per match)

The 1948–49 season was the 26th season of the Slovenian Republic League and the fourth in the SFR Yugoslavia. The league champions Železničar Ljubljana and second placed Rudar Trbovlje qualified for the Yugoslav Third League.

== Final table ==
Pos	Team	Pld	W	D	L	GF	GA	GD	Pts
1	Železničar Ljubljana	14	10	2	2	37	10	+27	22
2	Rudar Trbovlje	14	9	2	3	35	21	+14	20
3	Branik Maribor	14	6	3	5	21	18	+3	15
4	Nafta Lendava	14	6	1	7	33	27	+6	13
5	Želenzičar Maribor	14	5	3	6	26	25	+1	13
6	Korotan Kranj	14	4	3	7	20	45	−25	11
7	Murska Sobota	14	4	2	8	21	24	−3	10
8	Kladivar Celje	14	2	4	8	15	28	−13	8

== Qualification for Yugoslav Second League ==
12 June 1949

Železničar Ljubljana	1–2	Željezničar Sarajevo

ŽŠD Stadium, Ljubljana
19 June 1949

Železničar Ljubljana	0–1 (3–0 p.f.)	Sutjeska Nikšić

ŽŠD Stadium, Ljubljana
26 June 1949

11 Oktobar Kumanovo	1–1	Železničar Ljubljana

Kumanovo
3 August 1949

Željezničar Sarajevo	1–0	Železničar Ljubljana

Stadion 6. April, Sarajevo
10 August 1949

Sutjeska Nikšić	1–1	Železničar Ljubljana

Nikšić
17 August 1949

Železničar Ljubljana	2–4	11 Oktobar Kumanovo

ŽŠD Stadium, Ljubljana

Pos	Team	Pld	W	D	L	GF	GA	GD	Pts
1	Željezničar Sarajevo	6	5	0	1	16	2	+14	10
2	11 Oktobar Kumanovo	6	3	1	2	9	13	−4	7
3	Železničar Ljubljana	6	1	2	3	8	9	−1	4
4	Sutjeska Nikšić	6	1	1	4	4	13	−9	3
