= Peter Mesesnel =

Slovenian footballer

Personal information
- Full name: Peter Mesesnel
- Date of birth: 8 April 1971 (age 55)
- Place of birth: Ljubljana, SFR Yugoslavia
- Position: Midfielder

Senior career*
Years	Team	Apps	(Gls)
1991–1994	NK Ljubljana	84	(5)
1994–1996	Črnuče		
1997–1998	Domžale		
- * Club domestic league appearances and goals

Peter Mesesnel is a retired Slovenian footballer.

He played most of his career for NK Ljubljana.
