= Adrović =

Adrović is a surname. Notable people with the surname include:

- Enver Adrović (born 1969), Montenegrin footballer
- Admir Adrović (born 1988), Montenegrin footballer
