= 1967–68 Slovenian Republic League =

Slovenian Republic League
- Season: 1967–68
- Champions: Ljubljana
- Matches played: 132
- Goals scored: 469 (3.55 per match)

== Final table ==
Pos	Team	Pld	W	D	L	GF	GA	GD	Pts
1	Ljubljana	22	14	5	3	65	29	+36	33
2	Mura	22	13	5	4	65	34	+31	31
3	Kladivar Celje	22	8	10	4	35	23	+12	26
4	Slavija Vevče	22	9	6	7	37	30	+7	24
5	Triglav Kranj	22	8	8	6	31	37	−6	24
6	Koper	22	7	8	7	32	33	−1	22
7	Nova Gorica	22	7	7	8	33	33	0	21
8	Železničar Maribor	22	7	5	10	41	56	−15	19
9	Rudar Trbovlje	22	7	4	11	42	53	−11	18
10	Kovinar Maribor	22	4	9	9	27	42	−15	17
11	Svoboda	22	6	5	11	35	52	−17	17
12	Hrastnik	22	4	4	14	26	59	−33	12
