= 1988–89 Slovenian Republic League =

Slovenian Republic League
- Season: 1988–89
- Champions: Ljubljana
- Relegated: Svoboda; Kladivar Celje; Kovinar Maribor
- Matches: 182
- Goals: 435 (2.39 per match)

== Final table ==
| Pos | Team | Pld | W | D | L | GF | GA | GD | Pts |
|---|---|---|---|---|---|---|---|---|---|
| 1 | Ljubljana | 26 | 14 | 8 | 4 | 55 | 20 | +35 | 36 |
| 2 | Izola | 26 | 11 | 10 | 5 | 31 | 16 | +15 | 32 |
| 3 | Vozila | 26 | 13 | 5 | 8 | 35 | 30 | +5 | 31 |
| 4 | Mura | 26 | 13 | 4 | 9 | 45 | 31 | +14 | 30 |
| 5 | Pohorje | 26 | 8 | 13 | 5 | 26 | 21 | +5 | 29 |
| 6 | Rudar Velenje | 26 | 10 | 9 | 7 | 34 | 34 | 0 | 29 |
| 7 | Medvode | 26 | 9 | 10 | 7 | 29 | 33 | −4 | 28 |
| 8 | Stol Kamnik | 26 | 8 | 11 | 7 | 31 | 35 | −4 | 27 |
| 9 | Domžale | 26 | 8 | 10 | 8 | 29 | 30 | −1 | 26 |
| 10 | Elkroj Mozirje | 26 | 8 | 9 | 9 | 22 | 39 | −17 | 25 |
| 11 | Partizan Žalec | 26 | 5 | 12 | 9 | 24 | 33 | −9 | 22 |
| 12 | Svoboda | 26 | 5 | 10 | 11 | 33 | 30 | +3 | 20 |
| 13 | Kladivar Celje | 26 | 4 | 10 | 12 | 18 | 34 | −16 | 18 |
| 14 | Kovinar Maribor | 26 | 2 | 7 | 17 | 23 | 49 | −26 | 11 |
