= NK Šentjur (defunct) =

Šentjur
- Full name: Nogometni klub Šentjur
- Founded: 1991; 34 years ago
- Dissolved: 2000; 25 years ago
- Ground: Šentjur Sports Park
Home colours

Nogometni klub Šentjur (English: Šentjur Football Club), commonly referred to as NK Šentjur or simply Šentjur, was a Slovenian football club from Šentjur, which played a total of six seasons in the Slovenian Second League. The club was dissolved in 2000, when a new club, named Mladi upi Šentjur, was founded. The club played their home games at Šentjur Sports Park.

== Honours ==
- Slovenian Third League
  - Winners: 1994–95
- Slovenian Fourth Division
  - Winners: 1993–94
- MNZ Celje Cup
  - Winners: 1994–95, 1995–96, 1996–97, 1999–2000

== League history ==
Season	League	Position	Notes
1991–92	/	/	Didn't enter any competitions
1992–93	MNZ Celje (level 4)	2nd	Lost play-off for first place
1993–94	MNZ Celje (level 4)	1st	Promoted to Slovenian Third League
1994–95	3. SNL – East	1st	Won play-off for Slovenian Second League
1995–96	2. SNL	4th	/
1996–97	2. SNL	6th	/
1997–98	2. SNL	12th	/
1998–99	2. SNL	9th	/
1999–2000	2. SNL	12th	/
2000–01	2. SNL	14th	Withdrew from competition during the season. Club dissolved.
