= 1966–67 Slovenian Republic League =

Slovenian Republic League
- Season: 1966–67
- Champions: Ljubljana
- Relegated: Branik Maribor; Slovan
- Matches played: 132
- Goals scored: 498 (3.77 per match)

== Final table ==
Pos	Team	Pld	W	D	L	GF	GA	GD	Pts
1	Ljubljana	22	14	4	4	61	30	+31	32
2	Mura	22	12	4	6	63	43	+20	28
3	Železničar Maribor	22	12	4	6	47	28	+19	28
4	Slavija Vevče	22	12	4	6	41	29	+12	28
5	ŽŠD Celje	22	9	6	7	45	28	+17	24
6	Nova Gorica	22	9	5	8	30	29	+1	23
7	Svoboda	22	10	2	10	51	50	+1	22
8	Rudar Trbovlje	22	9	4	9	39	47	−8	22
9	Triglav Kranj	22	9	2	11	33	36	−3	20
10	Kovinar Maribor	22	9	2	11	40	50	−10	20
11	Branik Maribor	22	2	5	15	24	64	−40	9
12	Slovan	22	2	4	16	24	64	−40	8
