= 1994–95 Slovenian PrvaLiga =

Slovenian PrvaLiga
- Season: 1994–95
- Champions: Olimpija (4th title)
- Relegated: Dekani; Kočevje; Ljubljana; Koper; Vevče; Naklo
- UEFA Cup: Olimpija; Maribor
- Cup Winners' Cup: Mura
- Intertoto Cup: Rudar
- Matches played: 240
- Goals scored: 741 (3.09 per match)
- Top goalscorer: Štefan Škaper (25 goals)
- Biggest home win: Beltinci 9–0 Dekani
- Biggest away win: Dekani 0–10 Vevče
- Highest scoring: Dekani 0–10 Vevče
- Longest winning run: 9 games Olimpija
- Longest unbeaten run: 13 games Maribor
- Longest winless run: 30 games Dekani
- Longest losing run: 14 games Dekani
- Highest attendance: 7,000; Maribor 0–2 Olimpija
- Lowest attendance: 100; Dekani 0–10 Vevče
- Total attendance: 270,450
- Average attendance: 1,126

The 1994–95 Slovenian PrvaLiga season started on 7 August 1994 and ended on 31 May 1995. Each team played a total of 30 matches.

== League table ==
Pos	Team	Pld	W	D	L	GF	GA	GD	Pts	Qualification or relegation
1	Olimpija (C)	30	20	4	6	78	30	+48	44	Qualification to UEFA Cup preliminary round
2	Maribor	30	17	8	5	60	24	+36	42	Qualification to UEFA Cup preliminary round
3	Gorica	30	18	5	7	66	30	+36	41	
4	Mura	30	17	6	7	46	24	+22	40	Qualification to Cup Winners' Cup qualifying round
5	Beltinci	30	15	8	7	74	32	+42	38	
6	Celje	30	16	6	8	50	27	+23	38	
7	Rudar Velenje	30	16	6	8	55	33	+22	38	Qualification to Intertoto Cup group stage
8	Korotan Prevalje	30	14	4	12	53	36	+17	32	
9	Primorje (O)	30	12	8	10	50	45	+5	32	Qualification to relegation play-offs
10	Železničar Ljubljana (R)	30	13	4	13	49	43	+6	30	Qualification to relegation play-offs
11	Koper (R)	30	9	8	13	24	34	−10	26	Qualification to relegation play-offs
12	Slavija Vevče (R)	30	8	4	18	36	58	−22	20	Qualification to relegation play-offs
13	Izola (O)	30	7	6	17	30	73	−43	20	Qualification to relegation play-offs
14	Naklo (R)	30	5	9	16	34	48	−14	19	Qualification to relegation play-offs
15	Kočevje (Note: 1 point deducted.) (R)	30	4	9	17	24	91	−67	16	Relegation to MNZ leagues (Note: Kočevje and Jadran Dekani were originally relegated to the Second League, but were administratively relegated to the MNZ leagues due to financial reasons.)
16	Jadran Dekani (R)	30	0	3	27	12	113	−101	3	Relegation to MNZ leagues

Source: PrvaLiga (in Slovene)
(C) Champions; (O) Play-off winners; (R) Relegated

=== Relegation play-offs ===
==== First round ====
14 June 1995
18:00 CEST

Koper	1–1	Železničar Ljubljana
Ribarič 55'		Vončina 87'

Bonifika, Koper
Attendance: 1,500
Referee: Vili Kranjc
18 June 1995
18:00 CEST

Železničar Ljubljana	3–0	Koper
Miškič 7'; Gliha 27', 88'

ŽŠD Stadium, Ljubljana
Attendance: 1,200
Referee: Štefan Tivold

14 June 1995
18:00 CEST

Primorje	2–2	Naklo
Božič 31'; Lučić 59'		Hristov 56'; Marušič 72'

City Stadium, Ajdovščina
Attendance: 1,200
Referee: Srečko Kandare
18 June 1995
18:00 CEST

Naklo	0–1	Primorje
		Stanič 38'

Stanko Mlakar Stadium, Kranj
Referee: Zoran Novarlić

14 June 1995
18:00 CEST

Vevče	2–1	Nafta Lendava
Kosič 9'; Komočar 22'		Vicković 12'

Slavija Stadium, Vevče
Attendance: 800
Referee: Silvo Borošak
18 June 1995
18:00 CEST

Nafta Lendava	0–2	Vevče
		Komočar 70'; Jolič 73'

City Stadium, Lendava
Attendance: 2,000
Referee: Žarko Vidali

14 June 1995
18:00 CEST

Šmartno	0–1	Izola
		Velkoski 5'

Šmartno Stadium, Šmartno ob Paki
Attendance: 1,500
Referee: Milan Mitrović
18 June 1995
18:00 CEST

Izola	3–0	Šmartno ob Paki
Bičakčić 44'; Zupanc 52'; Žlogar 87'

City Stadium, Izola
Attendance: 300
Referee: Jože Klinc

==== Second round ====
21 June 1995
18:00 CEST

Izola	0–0	Železničar Ljubljana

City Stadium, Izola
Attendance: 600
Referee: Žarko Hvalič
25 June 1995
18:00 CEST

Železničar Ljubljana	1–1	Izola
Prelogar 36' (pen.)		Velkoski 37'

Bežigrad Stadium, Ljubljana
Attendance: 1,200
Referee: Zoran Novarlić

21 June 1995
18:00 CEST

Primorje	2–0	Vevče
Vrabac 52' (pen.); Mulahmetović 88'

City Stadium, Ajdovščina
Attendance: 1,300
Referee: Ivan Žunič
25 June 1995
18:00 CEST

Vevče	0–3	Primorje
		Vrabac 5', 21'; B. Lučić 53'

Slavija Stadium, Vevče
Attendance: 1,500
Referee: Žarko Vidali

Izola and Primorje won a place in the 1995–96 Slovenian PrvaLiga.

== Results ==
Home \ Away	BEL	CEL	GOR	IZO	JAD	KOČ	KOP	KPR	MAR	MUR	NAK	OLI	PRI	RUD	SLA	ŽLJ
Beltinci		1–1	0–0	6–1	9–0	8–0	0–0	4–2	1–1	3–1	4–0	4–2	2–1	3–3	5–0	7–2
Celje	2–2		2–0	1–0	2–1	4–0	2–0	0–0	1–2	0–0	3–0	3–2	1–0	3–2	5–0	1–0
Gorica	1–0	2–1		4–0	7–0	3–0	5–1	1–0	1–0	2–2	1–1	2–1	3–1	3–1	6–1	2–4
Izola	1–1	0–3	1–3		3–0	1–1	0–1	3–1	1–1	0–1	2–0	0–2	2–2	1–3	2–1	1–0
Jadran Dekani	1–3	0–3	1–2	0–1		0–0	0–1	1–5	0–7	0–3	0–1	0–5	0–1	1–1	0–10	1–4
Kočevje	1–0	1–1	1–8	4–3	3–3		2–1	2–0	0–3	1–1	1–1	1–2	0–0	2–2	1–3	0–1
Koper	0–1	2–1	0–1	1–1	2–0	0–0		2–2	0–0	0–3	2–1	1–1	1–1	1–2	1–0	0–0
Korotan Prevalje	1–0	1–3	2–1	7–0	6–0	5–0	0–1		0–1	1–0	3–1	1–3	2–1	0–0	2–0	1–0
Maribor	1–2	3–1	2–1	5–0	5–0	6–1	2–0	1–0		1–0	5–1	0–2	2–1	3–2	1–1	4–3
Mura	1–2	1–0	3–2	4–1	2–0	4–0	3–2	1–1	0–0		1–0	1–0	0–0	4–2	2–0	1–0
Naklo	2–0	0–0	0–0	1–1	7–2	8–0	1–2	2–3	0–0	0–2		1–2	1–1	0–3	0–0	0–1
Olimpija	1–1	2–1	1–1	7–0	7–0	4–0	1–0	1–0	2–1	2–1	0–2		7–2	2–1	7–1	1–2
Primorje	1–0	2–1	2–0	2–0	5–1	6–0	1–0	4–3	2–2	1–2	4–2	1–3		1–1	2–1	2–4
Rudar Velenje	2–1	2–1	1–0	1–2	4–0	5–0	1–0	0–1	1–0	1–0	3–0	1–2	2–0		3–1	4–1
Slavija Vevče	1–3	0–1	0–2	6–1	2–0	3–0	1–0	2–1	0–1	0–1	1–0	0–5	1–1	0–0		0–1
Železničar Ljubljana	2–1	1–2	1–2	4–1	2–0	5–2	1–2	1–2	0–0	2–1	1–1	1–1	1–2	0–1	4–0	

Source: PrvaLiga (in Slovene)
Legend: Blue = home team win; Yellow = draw; Red = away team win.

== Top goalscorers ==
Rank	Player	Club	Goals
1	(Slovenia) Štefan Škaper	Beltinci	25
2	(Slovenia) Ermin Šiljak	Olimpija	17
2	(Slovenia) Novica Nikčević	Celje/Gorica	17
2	(Federal Republic of Yugoslavia) Slavko Komar	Rudar Velenje	17
5	(Albania) Kliton Bozgo	Maribor/Olimpija	16
5	(Albania) Edmond Dosti	Olimpija	16
7	(Slovenia) Primož Gliha	Ljubljana	13
8	(Slovenia) Dinko Vrabac	Primorje	12
8	(Slovenia) Igor Poznič	Mura/Maribor	12
8	(Federal Republic of Yugoslavia) Sami Dobreva	Korotan Prevalje	12

== See also ==
- 1994–95 Slovenian Football Cup
- 1994–95 Slovenian Second League
