= Enver Adrović =

Montenegrin footballer

Personal information
- Full name: Enver Adrović
- Date of birth: 20 May 1969 (age 57)
- Place of birth: Ivangrad, SFR Yugoslavia
- Height: 1.80 m (5 ft 11 in)
- Position: Midfielder

Senior career*
Years	Team	Apps	(Gls)
1989–1994	NK Ljubljana	96	(19)
1994	Gaj Kočevje	12	(1)
1995	Vevče Donit Filtri	7	(0)
1996–1997	Olimpija Ljubljana	26	(1)
1997–1998	Vorwärts Steyr	11	(0)
1999-2000	SAK Klagenfurt		
2000	Arsenal Tula		
2001-2002	Livar Ivančna Gorica	14	(3)
- * Club domestic league appearances and goals

Enver Adrović (Serbian Cyrillic: Енвер Адровић, born 20 May 1969) is a retired Montenegrin footballer from SFR Yugoslavia.

== Life and career ==
Born in Ivangrad, SFR Yugoslavia (now known as Berane) he played in the Slovenian PrvaLiga with NK Ljubljana and Olimpija Ljubljana and in Austrian Bundesliga with SK Vorwärts Steyr.
