= Dimitrije Srbu =

Serbian footballer

Personal information
- Full name: Dimitrije Srbu
- Date of birth: 2 December 1940
- Place of birth: Alibunar, Kingdom of Yugoslavia
- Date of death: 3 April 2017 (aged 76)
- Place of death: Ljubljana, Slovenia
- Position: Defender

Senior career*
| Years | Team | Apps | (Gls) |
- Vršac
| 1958–1960 | Partizan | 0 | (0) |
| 1961–1973 | Olimpija Ljubljana | | |

Managerial career
- Olimpija Ljubljana (youth)
- 1984–1985: Domžale
- 1994: Ljubljana
- * Club domestic league appearances and goals

Dimitrije Srbu (Serbian Cyrillic: Димитрије Србу; 2 December 1940 – 6 April 2017) was a Yugoslav football player and coach.

Born in Alibunar, in the Danube Banovina, Srbu started playing at FK Vršac before being brought by giants FK Partizan. But after two seasons in Yugoslav capital, he moved to Olimpija Ljubljana where he spent 12 years, becoming one of the most capped players of Olimpija in its history.

After retiring, he became a coach and coached the youth team of Olimpija, and later NK Domžale and NK Ljubljana.

He died in Slovenian capital Ljubljana on 3 April 2017.
