= 29th Pennsylvania Infantry Regiment =

Union Army infantry regiment

29th Pennsylvania Volunteer Infantry
- Active: May 15, 1861 – July 11, 1865
- Country: United States of America
- Allegiance: Union
- Branch: Infantry
- Engagements: Battle of Front Royal (Companies B & G); First Battle of Winchester; Battle of Chancellorsville; Battle of Gettysburg; Battle of Wauhatchie; Battle of Lookout Mountain; Battle of Missionary Ridge; Battle of Ringgold Gap; Atlanta campaign Battle of Resaca; Battle of Dallas; Battle of New Hope Church; Battle of Allatoona; Battle of Marietta; Battle of Kolb's Farm; Battle of Kennesaw Mountain; Battle of Peachtree Creek; Siege of Atlanta; Sherman's March to the Sea; Carolinas campaign Battle of Bentonville

The 29th Pennsylvania Volunteer Infantry was an infantry regiment that served in the Union Army during the American Civil War.

== Service ==
The 29th Pennsylvania Infantry was organized in Philadelphia, Pennsylvania, beginning May 15, 1861, for a three-year enlistment and mustered in July 1, 1861, under the command of Colonel John K. Murphy.

The regiment was attached to Gordon's Brigade, Department of the Susquehanna, August 1861. 3rd Brigade. Banks' Division, Army of the Potomac, to March 1862. 3rd Brigade, 1st Division, Banks' V Corps, and Department of the Shenandoah to June 1862. 3rd Brigade, 1st Division, II Corps, Army of Virginia, to September 1862. 3rd Brigade, 1st Division, XII Corps, Army of the Potomac, to March 1863. 2nd Brigade, 2nd Division, XII Corps, Army of the Potomac, to October 1863, and Army of the Cumberland to April 1864. 3rd Brigade, 2nd Division, XX Corps, Army of the Cumberland, to June 1865. Bartlett's Division, XXII Corps, Department of Washington, to July 1865.

The 29th Pennsylvania Infantry mustered out July 11, 1865.

== Detailed service ==
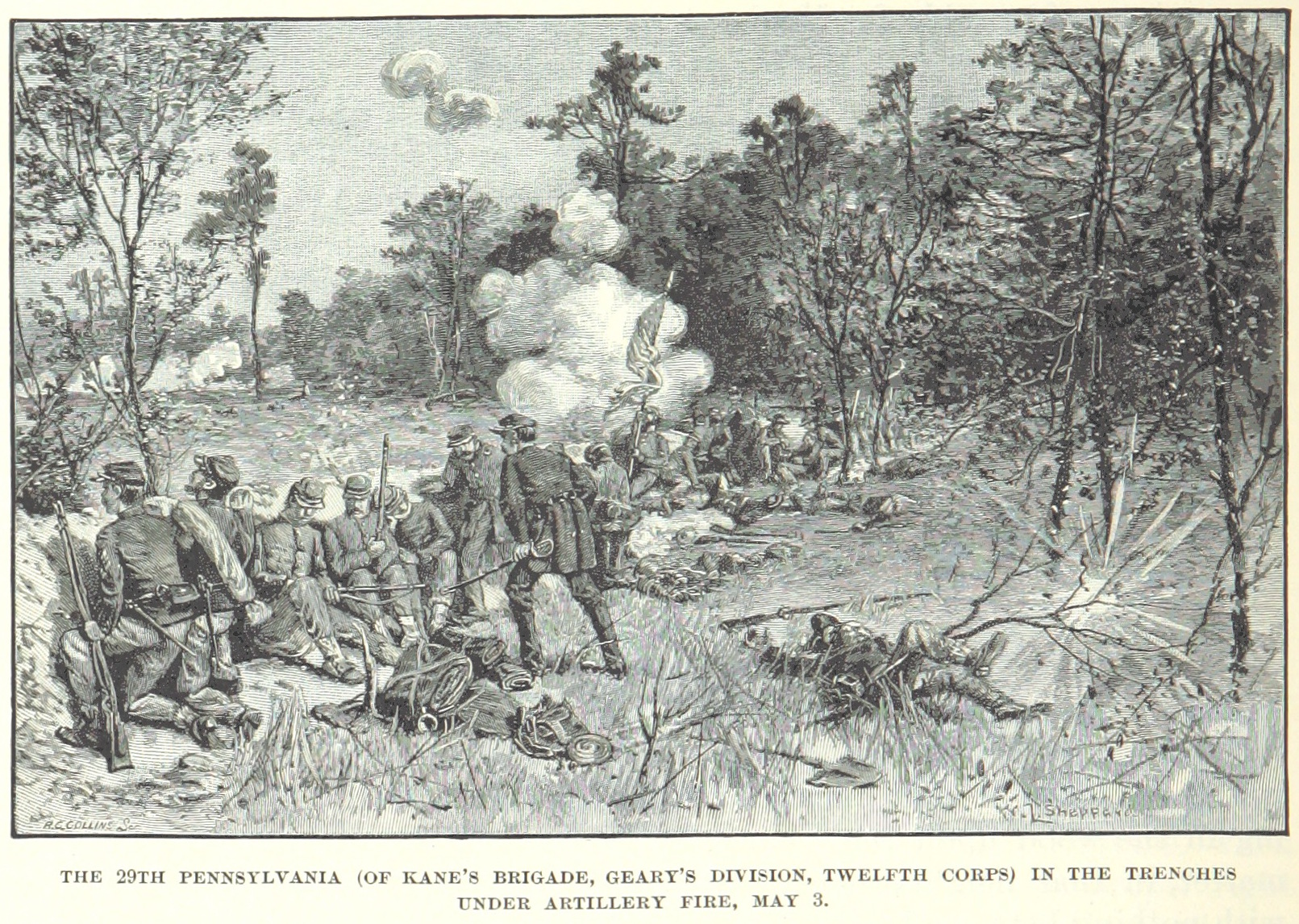
The 29th under fire in the trenches at the Battle of Chancellorsville

- 1861
  - Left Pennsylvania for Harpers Ferry, Va., August 3
  - Duty at Harpers Ferry and on the Upper Potomac River until February 1862
  - Operations about Dams 4 and 5 December 17–20, 1861
- 1862
  - Advance on Winchester March 1–12
  - Occupation of Winchester March 12
  - Pursuit of Jackson up the Shenandoah Valley March 24 – April 27
  - Woodstock April 1
  - Edenburg April 1–2
  - Stony Creek April 2
  - Operations in Shenandoah Valley May 15 – June 17
  - Front Royal May 23 (Companies B and G)
  - Buckton Station May 23
  - Middletown and Newtown May 24
  - Retreat to Williamsport May 24–26
  - Battle of Winchester May 25
  - At Williamsport until June 10
  - Moved to Front Royal June 10–18; then to Warrenton and Little Washington July 11–18
  - Pope's campaign in northern Virginia August 6 – September 2
  - Battle of Cedar Mountain August 9 (reserve)
  - Guarding supply trains during the Second Battle of Bull Run
  - Maryland Campaign September 6–24
  - Battle of Antietam September 16–17 (provost and rear guard)
  - Chambersburg, Pa., October 11
  - Duty at Maryland Heights until December
  - March to Fredericksburg, Va., December 10–16
  - Fairfax Station December 12
  - At Stafford Court House until April 1863
- 1863
  - "Mud March" January 20–24
  - Chancellorsville Campaign April 27 – May 6
  - Battle of Chancellorsville May 1–5
  - Gettysburg Campaign June 11 – July 24
  - Battle of Gettysburg July 1–3
  - Pursuit of Lee July 5–24
  - Duty on line of the Rappahannock River until September
  - Movement to Bridgeport, Ala., September 24 – October 3
  - Reopening Tennessee River October 26–29
  - Battle of Wauhatchie October 28–29
  - Chattanooga-Ringgold Campaign November 23–27
  - Battle of Lookout Mountain November 23–24
  - Missionary Ridge November 25
  - Ringgold Gap, Taylor's Ridge, November 27
  - Reenlisted December 10
  - Guard duty on Nashville & Chattanooga Railroad until April 1864
- 1864
  - Atlanta Campaign May 1 – September 8
  - Demonstration on Rocky Faced Ridge and Dalton May 8–13
  - Battle of Resaca May 14–15
  - Near Cassville May 19
  - New Hope Church May 25
  - Operations on line of Pumpkin Vine Creek and battles about Dallas, New Hope Church, and Allatoona Hills May 26 – June 5
  - Operations about Marietta and against Kennesaw Mountain June 10 – July 2
  - Pine Hill June 11–14
  - Lost Mountain June 15–17
  - Gilgal or Golgotha Church June 15
  - Muddy Creek June 17
  - Noyes Creek June 19
  - Kolb's Farm June 22
  - Assault on Kennesaw Mountain June 27
  - Ruff's Station or Smyrna Camp Ground July 4
  - Chattahoochie River July 5–17
  - Peachtree Creek July 19–20
  - Siege of Atlanta July 22 – August 25
  - Operations at Chattahoochie River Bridge August 26 – September 2
  - Occupation of Atlanta September 2 – November 15
  - Expedition to Tuckum's Cross Roads October 26–29
  - Near Atlanta November 9
  - March to the sea November 15 – December 10
  - Near Davidsboro November 28
  - Siege of Savannah December 10–21
- 1865
  - Carolinas Campaign January to April
  - Battle of Bentonville, N.C., March 19–21
  - Occupation of Goldsboro March 24
  - Advance on Raleigh April 9–13
  - Occupation of Raleigh April 14
  - Bennett's House April 26
  - Surrender of Johnston and his army
  - March to Washington, D.C., via Richmond, Va., April 29 – May 20
  - Grand Review of the Armies May 24
  - Duty in Department of Washington, D.C., until July.

== Casualties ==
The regiment lost a total of 187 men during service; 3 officers and 99 enlisted men killed or mortally wounded, 1 officer and 84 enlisted men died of disease.

== Commanders ==
- Colonel John K. Murphy – discharged April 23, 1863, due to disability
- Colonel William Rickards, Jr. – discharged November 2, 1864, due to wounds received in action at the Battle of Kennesaw Mountain
- Colonel Samuel M. Zulick

== See also ==
- List of Pennsylvania Civil War Units
- Pennsylvania in the Civil War
