= Roman Bengez =

Slovenian footballer and manager

Personal information
- Full name: Roman Bengez
- Date of birth: 22 February 1964
- Place of birth: SFR Yugoslavia
- Date of death: 2 July 2013 (aged 49)
- Place of death: Slovenia
- Position: Forward

Youth career
- Ljubljana

Senior career*
Years	Team	Apps	(Gls)
1981–1984	Olimpija		
1989–1992	Ljubljana		

Managerial career
- 2003–2004: Olimpija
- 2004–2005: Ljubljana
- * Club domestic league appearances and goals

Roman Bengez (22 February 1964 – 2 July 2013) was a Slovenian footballer and manager.

He played for Slovenian clubs Olimpija and Ljubljana, both of which he later managed in the Slovenian First League.
