= NK Steklar =

Steklar
- Full name: Nogometni klub Steklar
- Nickname: Steklarji (The Glaziers)
- Founded: 1946; 80 years ago (as NK Edinstvo)
- Dissolved: 1999; 27 years ago
- Ground: Rogaška Slatina City Stadium

Nogometni klub Steklar (English: Steklar Football Club), commonly referred to as NK Steklar or simply Steklar, was a Slovenian football club based in Rogaška Slatina. For two seasons, in 1991–92 and 1992–93, they played in the Slovenian PrvaLiga, the top division of Slovenian football. Founded in 1946 as NK Edinstvo, they eventually went bankrupt in 1999 and were dissolved.

A successor club was established in 1999 under the name NK Rogaška.

== League history since 1991 ==
Season	League	Position
1991–92	1. SNL	16th
1992–93	1. SNL	16th
1993–94	2. SNL	7th
1994–95	2. SNL	15th
1995–96	3. SNL – East	7th
1996–97	3. SNL – East	14th
1997–98	MNZ Celje (level 4)	4th
1998–99	MNZ Celje (level 4)	5th (Note: Club dissolved before the end of the season.)
