= Stanislav Komočar =

Slovenian footballer

Personal information
- Full name: Stanislav Komočar
- Date of birth: 20 February 1967 (age 59)
- Place of birth: Yugoslavia
- Position: Forward

Senior career*
Years	Team	Apps	(Gls)
1983–1985	Olimpija Ljubljana	30	(4)
1985–1990	Dinamo Zagreb	21	(0)
1987–1988	→ Olimpija Ljubljana (loan)		
1989–1990	→ NK Zagreb (loan)		
1990–1991	Olimpija Ljubljana	15	(1)
1992–1995	Gaj Kočevje		
1994–1995	Vevče Donit Filtri	20	(4)
1995–1997	FC HIT Gorica	37	(1)
1997–1998	SET Vevče	19	(3)
- * Club domestic league appearances and goals

Stanislav Komočar (born 20 February 1967) is a Slovenian retired footballer who played as a forward.

== Club career ==
Komočar joined Dinamo Zagreb from Olimpija Ljubljana, but was loaned to NK Zagreb and back to Olimpija. He played in the Slovenian PrvaLiga for HIT Gorica and Gaj Kočevje.
