= Komsan Pohkong =

Thai lawyer (born 1965)

Komson Pohkong

Thai Constitution Drafting Committee 2007

Personal details
- Born: July 3, 1965 (age 60)
- Profession: Instructor in faculty of law at Sukhothai Thammathirat Open University and independent scholars

Komsan Pohkong (Thai: คมสัน โพธิ์คง) is a lawyer from Thailand. He teach in faculty of law at Sukhothai Thammathirat Open University. In 2007, he was a member of Thai Constitution Drafting Committee 2007. He is also a member of Siam Prachapiwat (politic group) in Thailand.

== History ==
He was born on 3 July 1965. He graduated in doctoral degree of law from Chulalongkorn University. At now, he teach in faculty of law at Sukhothai Thammathirat Open University. In the free time, he like to shooting and play with his dog.

== Employment ==
- Former Vice-Chancellor Affairs (Administration) in Sukhothai Thammathirat Open University
- Expert Committee of the Constituent Assembly in Constituent Assembly 1997
- Legal Advisor of Election Commission 1999-2000
- Legal Advisor of Ministry of Education
- Assistant to the President in Sukhothai Thammathirat Open University
- Member of Thai Constitution Drafting Committee 2007

== Royal decorations ==
- Commander (Third Class) of the Most Exalted Order of the White Elephant
