= 1994–95 Slovenian Third League =

Slovenian Third League
- Season: 1994–95
- Champions: Šentjur (East); Črnuče (West)
- Relegated: Renkovci; Starše; Partizan; Pobrežje; Svoboda Brežice; Žalec; Radomlje; Korotan Šempas; Jesenice; Medvode
- Goals: 974

The 1994–95 Slovenian Third League was the third season of the Slovenian Third League, the third highest level in the Slovenian football system.

== League standings ==
=== East ===
Pos	Team	Pld	W	D	L	GF	GA	GD	Pts	Qualification or relegation
1	Šentjur (C, P)	23	16	3	4	60	19	+41	35	Qualification to play-offs
2	Dravograd	23	15	4	4	43	26	+17	34	
3	Aluminij	23	15	3	5	54	30	+24	33	
4	Bakovci	23	11	7	5	48	22	+26	29	
5	Pohorje	23	10	8	5	35	27	+8	28	
6	Bistrica	23	9	4	10	35	41	−6	22	
7	Kungota	23	8	5	10	39	37	+2	21	
8	Kovinar Maribor	23	9	6	8	25	24	+1	20 (Note: 4 points deducted.)	
9	Renkovci (R)	23	7	6	10	26	31	−5	20	Relegation to Slovenian Regional Leagues
10	Starše (R)	23	7	4	12	23	29	−6	18	Relegation to Slovenian Regional Leagues
11	Partizan (R)	23	2	5	16	18	54	−36	9	Relegation to Slovenian Regional Leagues
12	Pobrežje (R)	23	3	3	17	19	68	−49	9	Relegation to Slovenian Regional Leagues
13	Svoboda Brežice (R)	12	2	2	8	15	32	−17	6	Relegation to Slovenian Regional Leagues
14	Žalec (W)	0	–	–	–	–	–	—	0	Relegation to Slovenian Regional Leagues

(C) Champions; (P) Promoted; (R) Relegated; (W) Withdrew

=== West ===
Pos	Team	Pld	W	D	L	GF	GA	GD	Pts	Qualification or relegation
1	Črnuče (C)	26	19	6	1	93	5	+88	44	Qualification to play-offs
2	Tabor Sežana	26	16	5	5	57	21	+36	37	
3	Renče	26	13	7	6	54	35	+19	33	
4	Triglav Kranj	26	13	6	7	44	29	+15	32	
5	Jadran Kozina	26	14	2	10	43	33	+10	30	
6	Branik Šmarje	26	12	4	10	40	34	+6	28	
7	Litija	26	9	8	9	27	34	−7	26	
8	Brda	26	7	11	8	26	31	−5	25	
9	Arne Tabor 69	26	8	8	10	33	33	0	24	
10	Bilje	26	8	5	13	24	36	−12	21	
11	Radomlje (R)	26	5	8	13	23	50	−27	18	Relegation to Slovenian Regional Leagues
12	Korotan Šempas (R)	26	7	4	15	23	59	−36	18	Relegation to Slovenian Regional Leagues
13	Jesenice (R)	26	3	8	15	28	61	−33	14	Relegation to Slovenian Regional Leagues
14	Medvode (R)	26	4	6	16	19	73	−54	12 (Note: 2 points deducted?)	Relegation to Slovenian Regional Leagues

(C) Champions; (R) Relegated

== See also ==
- 1994–95 Slovenian Second League
