= Ivica Cvitkušić =

Croatian footballer

Personal information
- Full name: Ivica Cvitkušić
- Date of birth: 8 September 1964 (age 62)
- Place of birth: Gradačac, SR Bosnia and Herzegovina; Yugoslavia
- Position: Defender

Senior career*
Years	Team	Apps	(Gls)
1983–1984	Dinamo Zagreb	5	(1)
1984–1986	Dinamo Vinkovci	14	(0)
1985–1986	Rudar Ljubija	17	(1)
1988–1991	Dinamo Vinkovci	86	(1)
1991	Koper	5	(1)
1992	Djurgården	15	(1)
1993–1994	Vasalund	43	(3)
1994–1995	Koper	13	(0)
1996–1997	FC HIT	29	(1)
- Vukovar '91
- * Club domestic league appearances and goals

Ivica Cvitkušić (born 8 September 1964) is a Croatian retired footballer, who played in Croatian, Slovenian and Swedish clubs.

== Club career ==
Cvitkušić was born in Gradačac, Bosnia and Herzegovina, where he played in his youth. After a brief stint in NK Dinamo Zagreb, he spent several seasons in NK Dinamo Vinkovci, where he would later marry and make a permanent home. Later on, he played for Bosnian FK Rudar Ljubija and Swedish Djurgårdens IF and Vasalunds IF.

He played 15 Allsvenskan matches and made one goal for Djurgårdens IF in the 1992 Allsvenskan. He scored in the Tvillingderbyt match against AIK on 11 May 1992. Upon return from Sweden, he continued his career in Slovenia, and became the national champion with FC HIT in 1995. He returned to Croatia and played as a captain for HNK Vukovar '91, where he ended his playing career.

== Post-playing career ==
After retirement from playing, he continued career as a coach. He took over NK Zvijezda Gradačac from his birth town, and during the next eight years as a coach and sports director he helped promote it from the third to the First League of the Federation of Bosnia and Herzegovina. Afterwards, he worked in several lower-ranking clubs in Slavonia, including "Frankopan" from Rokovci and "Šokadija" from Babina Greda.

== Personal life ==
Cvitkušić lives in Vinkovci with his wife and three children.
