= Samir Zulič =

Slovenian footballer

Personal information
- Full name: Samir Zulić
- Date of birth: 8 January 1966 (age 60)
- Place of birth: Koper, SFR Yugoslavia
- Height: 1.88 m (6 ft 2 in)
- Position: Defender

Youth career
- Koper

Senior career*
Years	Team	Apps	(Gls)
1985–1991	Koper		
1991–1998	Olimpija	180	(58)
1998–1999	Koper	29	(4)
1999–2000	Olimpija	22	(0)

International career
1992–1995	Slovenia	8	(1)
- * Club domestic league appearances and goals

Samir Zulič (born 8 January 1966) is a Slovenian retired footballer who played as a defender.

== Club career ==
Zulič played for Koper in the Yugoslav Second League during the 1985–86 season.

== International career ==
Zulič has made eight appearances for the senior Slovenia national football team. He made his international debut on 3 June 1992 in the first official international match of Slovenia, a 1–1 international friendly with Estonia in Tallinn.

== Honours ==
Koper

- Slovenian Republic League (1): 1987–88
- Slovenian Republic Cup (2): 1989–90, 1990–91

Olimpija

- Slovenian PrvaLiga (4): 1991–92, 1992–93, 1993–94, 1994–95
- Slovenian Cup (2) : 1992–93, 1995–96
- Slovenian Supercup (1): 1995
