= Samuel Zulick =

Union Army officer and medical doctor

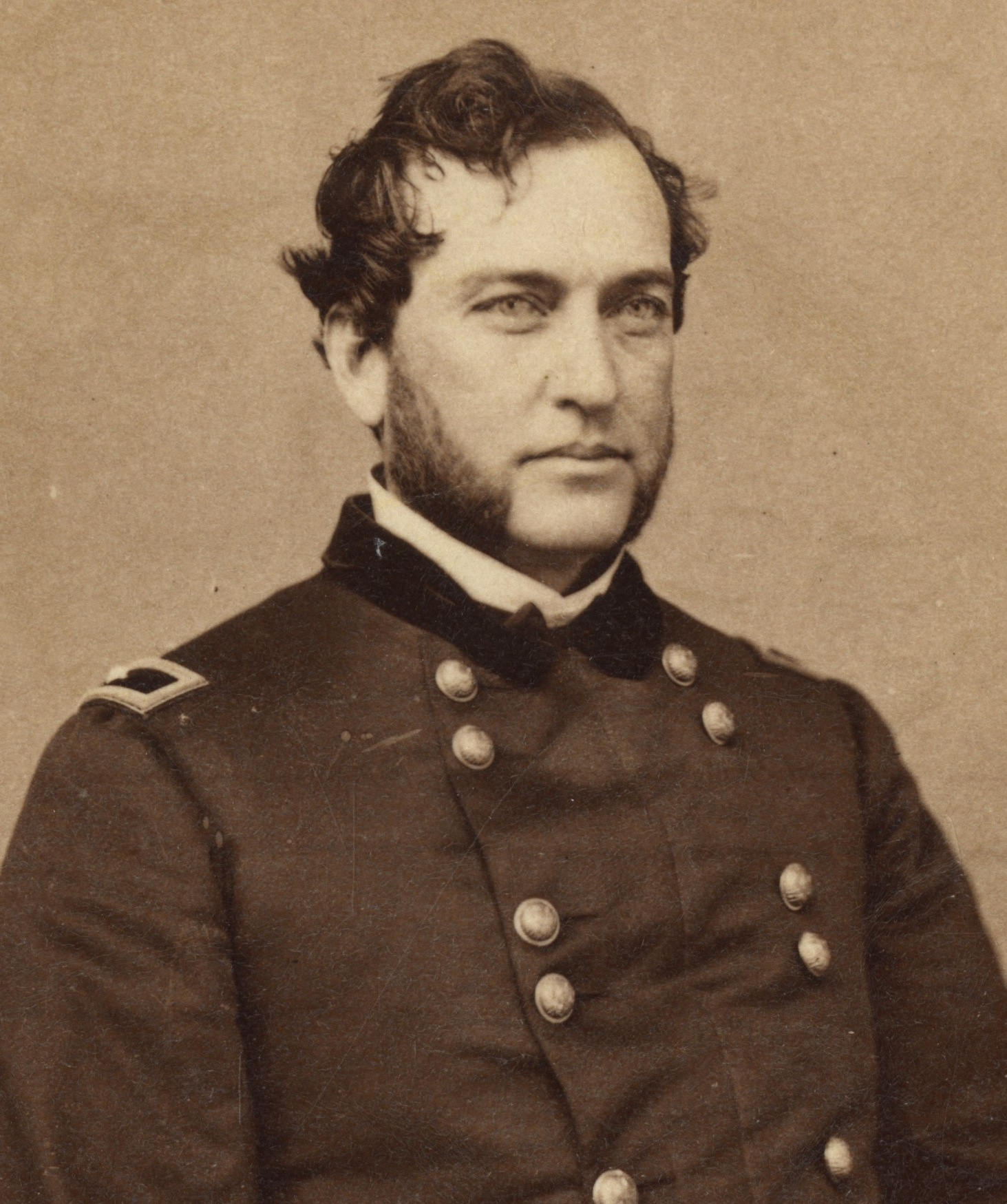
- Portrait of Zulick
- Born: Samuel Morton Zulick; March 1, 1824
- Died: June 10, 1876 (aged 52)
- Military career
- Conflicts: American Civil War

Samuel Morton Zulick (March 1, 1824 – June 10, 1876) was a Union Army officer and medical doctor during the American Civil War.

Zulick's father was a native of Frankfurt am Main while his mother was a native of Philadelphia. His son, Philip S. Zulick, served in the 45th Pennsylvania Infantry Regiment.

On May 15, 1861, he enlisted as private with the 29th Pennsylvania Volunteer Infantry. He was promoted to captain three months later. He was promoted to major after the Battle of Antietam and to lieutenant colonel after the Battle of Chancellorsville. He served at the Battle of Gettysburg and during Sherman's March to the Sea.

On January 13, 1866, President Andrew Johnson nominated Zulick for appointment to the grade of brevet brigadier general of volunteers, to rank from March 13, 1865, for "bravery and efficiency as an officer" and the United States Senate confirmed the appointment on March 12, 1866.

== See also ==
- List of American Civil War brevet generals (Union)
