= FC Ljubljana =

Defunct Slovenian association football club

Ljubljana
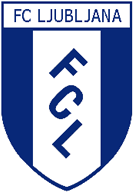
- Full name: FC Ljubljana
- Nickname(s): Šiškarji
- Founded: June 2005; 19 years ago
- Dissolved: 2011; 14 years ago
- Ground: ŽŠD Ljubljana Stadium
Home colours	Away colours

FC Ljubljana was a Slovenian football club, based in the capital city of Ljubljana. It was founded in June 2005. The club regarded themselves as the spiritual continuation of NK Ljubljana, a club that went bankrupt and was abolished in 2005. FC Ljubljana folded and was dissolved in 2011.

== History ==
The club emerged after the dissolution of NK Ljubljana, a club which played in the Slovenian First League, but went bankrupt in 2005. However, in spite of inheriting old Ljubljana's supporters and colours, FC Ljubljana was legally not considered as the successor of NK Ljubljana.

The club was established in June 2005, and started to compete in the fifth league. In 2006 they have finished second after Olimpija, scoring 15 wins and 66 goals in 17 matches. Next season they finished second again, but were promoted, due to forced relegation of Svoboda. They missed another promotion by one point in 2009, but then managed to win the fourth league and qualify for 3. SNL in the next year. After a season in third tier, Ljubljana was expelled from the league due to financial difficulties and was dissolved in 2011.

== Honours ==
- Ljubljana Regional League (fourth tier)
  - Winners: 2009–10

== Stadium ==
Ljubljana played its home matches at ŽŠD Ljubljana Stadium, located in the lower part of Šiška district. It was built in 1930 and underwent a major renovation in 1990. The stadium has a capacity of 2,308 seats.

== Domestic league and cup results ==
Season	League	Position	Pts	P	W	D	L	GF	GA
2005–06	5th level	2	45	17	15	0	2	66	10
2006–07	5th level	2	40	16	13	1	2	60	21
2007–08	4th level	4	48	26	15	3	8	47	29
2008–09	4th level	3	49	26	14	7	5	55	29
2009–10	4th level	1	58	26	18	4	4	80	19
2010–11	3. SNL	7	40	26	11	7	8	48	47
Totals			280	137	86	15	29	356	155
