= Erik Kržišnik =

Slovenian footballer

Personal information
- Full name: Erik Kržišnik
- Date of birth: 8 March 1974 (age 52)
- Place of birth: SFR Yugoslavia
- Position: Defender

Senior career*
Years	Team	Apps	(Gls)
1992–1994	Slovan	26	(2)
1994–1997	Olimpija Ljubljana	45	(1)
1997–1998	HIT Gorica	13	(0)
1998–2000	Primorje	28	(1)
2000	Domžale	15	(0)
2001	Olimpija Ljubljana	3	(0)
2001–2002	Triglav Kranj	31	(0)
2002	HIT Gorica	3	(0)
2002–2003	PAS Giannina	29	(0)
2003	Akratitos	4	(0)
2004	Mura	5	(0)
- * Club domestic league appearances and goals

Erik Kržišnik (born 8 March 1974) is a retired footballer who played as a defender for clubs in Slovenia and Greece.

== Club career ==
Kržišnik began playing football with ND Slovan in the Slovenian first division. He would play for several other first division clubs, including NK Olimpija Ljubljana, HIT Gorica, NK Primorje, NK Domžale and ND Triglav Kranj.

Kržišnik moved to Greece in July 2002, where he would play for Greek first division sides PAS Giannina F.C. and Akratitos F.C. He made 33 appearances in the Greek top flight.
