= Elvis Ribarič =

Slovenian footballer

Personal information
- Date of birth: 21 May 1972 (age 54)
- Position: Midfielder

Senior career*
Years	Team	Apps	(Gls)
1991–1995	Koper	87	(3)
1995–2001	Gorica	165	(7)
2001–2003	Primorje	52	(0)
2003–2005	Koper	19	(0)
2006	Korte	21	(0)
2007	Dekani	8	(0)
2010	Dekani	7	(0)

International career
1999	Slovenia	1	(0)
- * Club domestic league appearances and goals

Elvis Ribarič (born 21 May 1972) is a Slovenian retired football midfielder.

== Career ==
Ribarič was capped once by Slovenia, in an April 1999 friendly match against Finland.
