= NK Mengeš =

Mengeš
- Full name: Nogometni klub Mengeš
- Founded: 1928; 98 years ago
- Dissolved: 1997; 29 years ago
- Ground: Stadion pod Gobavico
- Capacity: 800

Nogometni klub Mengeš (English: Mengeš Football Club), commonly referred to as NK Mengeš or simply Mengeš, was a Slovenian football club which played in the town of Mengeš. The club was founded in 1928 and was dissolved in 1997, after the 1996–97 Slovenian Third League season.

The club colours were yellow and black.

== Stadium ==
NK Mengeš played their home games at Stadion pod Gobavico. The stadium has a capacity for 800 spectators.

== Honours ==
- Slovenian Third League
  - Winners: 1993–94
- Slovenian Fourth Division:
  - Winners: 1992–93
