= NK Kočevje =

Slovenian football club

Kočevje
- Full name: Nogometni klub Kočevje
- Founded: 1920; 106 years ago
- Ground: Gaj Stadium
- League: Ljubljana Regional League
- 2025–26: Ljubljana Regional League, 11th of 13
- Website: nkkocevje.si
Home colours	Away colours

Nogometni klub Kočevje (English: Kočevje Football Club), commonly referred to as NK Kočevje or simply Kočevje, is a Slovenian football club from Kočevje that competes in the Ljubljana Regional League, the fourth level of the Slovenian football system. The club was founded in 1920.

Kočevje won the Slovenian Second League in the 1993–94 season and competed in the top division, Slovenian PrvaLiga, during the 1994–95 season, before going bankrupt at the end of the season.

== Honours ==
- Slovenian Second League
  - Winners: 1993–94
- Ljubljana Regional League (fourth tier)
  - Winners: 2018–19, 2022–23
