= Vili Bečaj =

Slovenian footballer

Personal information
- Date of birth: 8 September 1967 (age 59)
- Position: Midfielder

Senior career*
Years	Team	Apps	(Gls)
1988–1994	Koper	54	(13)
1991	→ Jadran Dekani	17	(2)
1992	→ Svoboda Ljubljana	17	(1)
1994–2000	HIT Gorica	174	(31)
2000–2003	Koper	56	(7)
2003–2004	Izola	16	(2)

International career
1995–1996	Slovenia	2	(0)
- * Club domestic league appearances and goals

Vili Bečaj (born 8 September 1967) is a retired Slovenian football midfielder.

== International career ==
Bečaj made his debut for Slovenia in a September 1995 European Championship qualification match away against Italy, coming on as a 78th-minute substitute for Zlatko Zahovič. He earned a total of 2 caps, scoring no goals, his second and final international being a May 1996 friendly match against the United Arab Emirates.
