= Nenad Protega =

Slovenian footballer

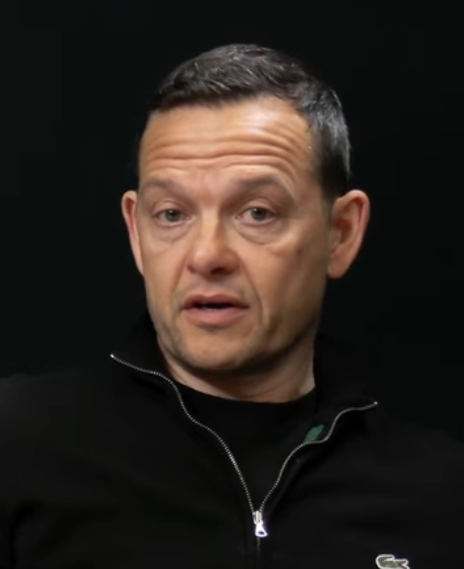

Personal information
- Date of birth: 11 October 1969 (age 57)
- Position: Midfielder

Senior career*
Years	Team	Apps	(Gls)
–1991	Slovan		
1991–1994	Olimpija	87	(12)
1995	Vevče	1	(0)
1995–1998	Gorica	84	(8)
1998–2002	Domžale	97	(29)
- * Club domestic league appearances and goals

Nenad Protega (born 11 October 1969) is a Slovenian retired football midfielder.
