= NK Ljubljana =

Ljubljana
- Full name: Nogometni klub Ljubljana
- Nickname(s): Šiškarji; Železničarji (The Railroaders); Modro-beli (The Blue and Whites)
- Founded: 1909; 116 years ago (as Hermes)
- Dissolved: 2005; 20 years ago
- Ground: ŽŠD Stadium
Home colours	Away colours

Nogometni klub Ljubljana (English: Ljubljana Football Club), commonly referred to as NK Ljubljana or simply Ljubljana, was a Slovenian football club based in the capital city of Ljubljana. The club was established in 1909 and dissolved in 2005.

== History ==
=== Foundation ===
The club was founded in 1909 as students club Hermes and was one of the oldest football clubs in Slovenia. The club was reformed in the Kingdom of Yugoslavia as SK Hermes in late 1918 and played in the Ljubljana Subassociation League from 1920 on, scoring best result with fourth place on four occasions. In 1925, the club added a prefix Železničarski (lit. 'Railway's') to its name. ŽSK Hermes was from then on clearly defined as a workers club.

=== Time of SFR Yugoslavia ===
After the Second World War, the club was reestablished as Železničar Ljubljana, which was later still commonly used name, due to club playing in the framework of Railway Sports Society (Slovene: Železničarsko Športno Društvo) on the ŽŠD Ljubljana stadium. Železničar won its first Slovenian Republic League title in 1949 and played in one-off Slovene-Croatian league 1952–53, which was at the time second level of Yugoslav football system. They finished ninth and were relegated due to dissolution of the league. The club was then renamed as ŽNK Ljubljana and played in third level inter-republic league. They finished second in 1954, but lost the qualifying match for second league. After the reorganization of Yugoslav football, they played in newly established Yugoslav Second League A Zone from 1955 until 1958, finishing on 5th, 8th and 10th place. This league system was then changed again and Ljubljana was relegated back to Slovenian Republic League. They have won it three times, in 1963, 1967 and 1968, before finally returning to Yugoslav Second League, where they played until 1972. After three solid seasons, finishing 11th, 10th and 6th, Ljubljana was unexpectedly relegated with 17th place in its fourth appearance. Their status of the Ljubljana's second strongest club was taken over by financially much stronger Svoboda. Ljubljana then managed to win Slovenian Republic League again in the 1989.

=== Slovenian league era ===
After the independence, they have played in Slovenian First League for four seasons. In 1991–92 they played as Eurospekter Ljubljana and Finished fifth, before renaming to AM Cosmos Ljubljana. 1992–93 was their best season, as they were in serious competition for the title after the fall season, but finished fourth due to poor finish. In 1993–94 they finished 11th, but then renamed back to Železničar Ljubljana, having new president and bigger ambitions for 1994–95 season. They started quite well, but fell again in the spring period, specially with three defeats in last three rounds, which pushed them to final 10th place. Due to reduction of Slovenian First League to 10 teams, they had to play additional relegation play-off, in which they went as clear favourites, but failed in the second round against Izola after 1–1 and 0–0, due to away goals rule. Železničar then won the Slovenian Second League easily in 1996, but was refused a licence for top flight football, so they stayed in second league, but withdrew during the next season. They were later passed a second league licence from feeder club Viator&Vektor Komenda, which has won the Slovenian Third League – Centre and the team renamed as Viator&Vektor Ljubljana in 2000. In next two seasons Ljubljana has played in Slovenian Second League, finishing seventh in 2001 and second in 2002, which was enough for comeback to Slovenian First League after seven years. This time they stayed there for three seasons, finishing in 10th, 7th, and 9th place. In their last season the club had struggled on the pitch and failed to obtain competition licences issued by the Football Association of Slovenia, which led to its dissolution in 2005. After finishing 9th in the national championship, NK Ljubljana effectively ceased all operations, together with another two top division teams, Olimpija and Mura.

A successor club which claimed rights to Ljubljana's honours and records was established in 2005 bearing the name FC Ljubljana. However, in spite of inheriting old Ljubljana's supporters and colours, they were not legally considered to be successors of the original NK Ljubljana and the two clubs track records and honours were kept separate by the Football Association of Slovenia. FC Ljubljana was later dissolved in 2011.

== Stadium ==
Ljubljana played its home matches at ŽŠD Ljubljana Stadium, located in the lower part of Šiška district. The ground was given to the club by the Railway administration and is therefore placed in a corner of railway tracks connection. Among other railway clubs forming the association, it has been used particularly by the athletics club ŽAK, which was taken as a nickname for the stadium. It was built in 1930 and underwent a major renovation in 1990. The stadium has a capacity of 2,308 seats.

== Supporters and rivalry ==
Although being the second most successful club in the city for most of its history, NK Ljubljana had a relatively small support. In the traditional city derby, most of the crowds have been on the side of popular citizens club Olimpija. Rivalry, that attracted even 10,000 spectators to the matches between Železničar and Odred in the post-war years, has eventually faded in the following decades. Rather neglected in the industrial Šiška, Ljubljana had some support in local workes, mostly residents from other Yugoslav republics. First organized fan groups of Ljubljana were formed in the early 1990s, when the club was playing a major role in Slovenian league.

== Club crest and colours ==
While the first kits used by Hermes were red and white, the club then adopted typical railway identity, using blue color through most of its history. Traditional Železničar's kits were striped in blue and white, but also other combinations of those colours were used in later years. Although sometimes playing in all-blue, the team was nicknamed as Modro-beli (The Blue and Whites) and the club's logo used stripes as the railway symbol. Former logos also featured various similar images, including railway winged wheel and modified Slovenian Railways sign. During the first division era, the green logo with a dragon was used. However, it was only actually used in blue version on the kits. The fairly distinctive sky blue-white combination, used in those first league years, was later replaced by dark blue.

=== Crest history ===
1950s crest

1980s crest

1990s crest

Regular crest
(2002–2005)

Sponsored alternate crest (2002–2003)

Sponsored alternate crest (2003–2005)

== Domestic league and cup results ==
Season	League	Position	Pts	P	W	D	L	GF	GA	Cup
1991–92	1. SNL	5	46	40	17	12	11	59	41	Round of 32
1992–93	1. SNL	4	40	34	16	8	10	44	34	Semi-finals
1993–94	1. SNL	11	25	30	8	9	13	29	44	First round
1994–95	1. SNL	10	30	30	13	4	13	49	43	First round
1995–96	2. SNL	1	67	29	20	7	2	62	20	Quarter-finals
1996–97	2. SNL	16	8	15	1	5	9	10	26	First round
1997–98	x	x	x	x	x	x	x	x	x	x
1998–99	5th level	1	20	15	2	3	60	26	47	x
1999–2000	4th level	8	27	22	8	3	11	42	59	x
2000–01	2. SNL	7	40	29	11	7	11	50	40	x
2001–02	2. SNL	2	72	30	22	6	2	89	12	Quarter-finals
2002–03	1. SNL	10	30 (−3)	31	9	6	16	41	66	Round of 16
2003–04	1. SNL	7	42	32	12	6	14	38	53	Semi-finals
2004–05	1. SNL	9	42	32	10	12	10	38	43	Round of 16
Totals	1. SNL	0 Titles	255	229	85	57	87	298	324	0 Cups

Note: Among "Totals", only statistics from Slovenian top flight are counted.

== Honours ==
- Slovenian Republic Football League
  - Winners: 1948–49, 1962–63, 1966–67, 1967–68, 1988–89
- Slovenian Second League
  - Winners: 1995–96
- MNZ Ljubljana Cup
  - Winners: 2000–01, 2001–02

== Managers ==
- Miloš Šoškić (1991–1992)
- Filip Mendaš (1993)
- Nedeljko Gugolj (1993–1994)
- Dimitrije Srbu (1994)
- Janez Zavrl (1994)
- Željko Fundak (1994–1995)
- Danilo Popivoda (1995)
- Nedeljko Gugolj (1995)
- Jedinko Perica (1995)
- Miloš Šoškić (1995–2001)
- Mihael Kebe (2001–2002)
- Suad Beširević (2002–2003)
- Dinko Vrabac (2003)
- Tomaž Kavčič (2003)
- Stojan Plešinac (2004)
- Safet Hadžić (2004–2005) (Note: Safet Hadžić was officially a manager of the team in 2004–05; however, at the matches, the team was managed by Roman Bengez as Hadžić did not have a UEFA Pro Licence at the time.)
