= Šiška Sports Park =

Sports venue in Ljubljana, Slovenia

- Interactive map of Šiška Sports Park
- Former names: Stadion ŽŠD
- Location: Spodnja Šiška; Ljubljana, Slovenia
- Coordinates: 46°4′10″N 14°29′58″E
- Owner: City of Ljubljana
- Operator: Javni zavod Šport Ljubljana
- Capacity: 2,308
- Surface: Natural grass

Construction
- Opened: 1931
- Renovated: 1940, 1950s, 1986, 2025–present

Tenants
- NK Ljubljana (1930–2005); NK Factor / NK Interblock (2004–2012); FC Ljubljana (2005–2011); NK Olimpija Ljubljana (2007–2010); NK Bravo (2014–2025); ŠD NK Ljubljana (2014–present); ŽNK Olimpija Ljubljana (2020–present)

Šiška Sports Park (Slovene: Športni park Šiška) is a multi-purpose sports venue in Ljubljana, Slovenia. The venue includes a main football stadium with outdoor track and field, an athletics hall, two football fields with artificial turf, and tennis courts. The main football stadium is commonly named ŽAK Stadium (Slovene: Stadion ŽAK), which has been used as a venue for several Ljubljana-based clubs, namely NK Ljubljana, NK Interblock, NK Olimpija Ljubljana and NK Bravo, for their matches in the Slovenian First League.

The stadium has a capacity of 2,308 seats and was opened in 1931. It is owned by the City of Ljubljana. Previously, it was operated by the Railway Sports Association Ljubljana (Slovene: Železničarsko športno društvo Ljubljana (ŽŠD Ljubljana)).

== Slovenia men's national team matches ==
| Date | Competition | Opponent | Result | Attendance |
|---|---|---|---|---|
| 7 April 1993 | Friendly | Estonia | 2–0 | 2,000 |
| 28 April 1999 | Friendly | Finland | 1–1 | 2,000 |

== See also ==
- List of football stadiums in Slovenia
