= 2007–08 UEFA Cup qualifying rounds =

The qualifying rounds for the 2007–08 UEFA Cup began on 19 July 2007. In total, there were two qualifying rounds which narrowed clubs down to 80 teams in preparation for the first round.

Times are CEST (UTC+2), as listed by UEFA.

== First qualifying round ==
=== Summary ===
The draw, which was conducted by UEFA General Secretary David Taylor and Michele Centenaro, UEFA's head of club competitions, was held on Friday, 29 June 2007 at 13:30 CET in Nyon, Switzerland. The matches were played on 19 July and 2 August 2007.

Team 1	Agg.	Team 2	1st leg	2nd leg
Southern region
Budućnost Podgorica (Montenegro)	1–2	(Croatia) Hajduk Split	1–1	0–1
Omonia (Cyprus)	4–0	(Montenegro) Rudar Pljevlja	2–0	2–0
Slaven Belupo (Croatia)	8–4	(Albania) Teuta	6–2	2–2
Bežanija (Serbia)	2–2 (a)	(Albania) Besa	2–2	0–0
Sliema Wanderers (Malta)	0–7	(Bulgaria) Litex Lovech	0–3	0–4
Vojvodina (Serbia)	7–1	(Malta) Hibernians	5–1	2–0
FC Santa Coloma (Andorra)	1–4	(Israel) Maccabi Tel Aviv	1–0	0–4
Široki Brijeg (Bosnia and Herzegovina)	6–3	(Slovenia) Koper	3–1	3–2
Vardar (North Macedonia)	0–2	(Cyprus) Anorthosis Famagusta	0–1	0–1
HIT Gorica (Slovenia)	2–4	(North Macedonia) Rabotnicki	1–2	1–2
Zrinjski Mostar (Bosnia and Herzegovina)	w/o (Note: UEFA expelled Partizan from the 2007–08 UEFA Cup due to crowd trouble at their away tie in Mostar, which forced the match to be interrupted for 10 minutes. UEFA adjudged travelling Partizan fans to have been the culprits of the trouble, but Partizan were allowed to play the return leg while the appeal was being processed. However, Partizan's appeal was rejected so Zrinjski Mostar advanced on a walkover.)	(Serbia) Partizan	1–6	0–5
Central–East region
ViOn Zlaté Moravce (Slovakia)	4–2	(Kazakhstan) Alma-Ata	3–1	1–1
MTK Budapest (Hungary)	2–2 (a)	(Armenia) Mika	2–1	0–1
MKT Araz (Azerbaijan)	0–1	(Poland) Groclin Grodzisk Wielkopolski	0–0	0–1
Bełchatów (Poland)	2–2 (4–2 p)	(Georgia (country)) Ameri Tbilisi	2–0	0–2 (a.e.t.)
Artmedia Petržalka (Slovakia)	3–3 (a)	(Moldova) Zimbru Chișinău	1–1	2–2
Banants (Armenia)	1–5	(Switzerland) Young Boys	1–1	0–4
Nistru Otaci (Moldova)	2–2 (4–5 p)	(Hungary) Honvéd	1–1	1–1 (a.e.t.)
Ried (Austria)	4–3	(Azerbaijan) Neftçi	3–1	1–2
Dinamo Tbilisi (Georgia (country))	2–0	(Liechtenstein) Vaduz	2–0	0–0
Aktobe (Kazakhstan)	3–4	(Austria) Mattersburg	1–0	2–4
Northern region
B36 (Faroe Islands)	3–6	(Lithuania) Ekranas	1–3	2–3
Libertas (San Marino)	1–4	(Republic of Ireland) Drogheda United	1–1	0–3
Rhyl (Wales)	3–3 (a)	(Finland) Haka	3–1	0–2
Carmarthen Town (Wales)	3–14	(Norway) Brann	0–8	3–6
Flora (Estonia)	0–2	(Norway) Vålerenga	0–1	0–1
MYPA (Finland)	2–1	(Faroe Islands) EB/Streymur	1–0	1–1
Dungannon Swifts (Northern Ireland)	1–4	(Lithuania) Sūduva	1–0	0–4
Lillestrøm (Norway)	2–2 (a)	(Luxembourg) Käerjéng 97	2–1	0–1
Liepājas Metalurgs (Latvia)	3–2	(Belarus) Dynamo Brest	1–1	2–1
Helsingborgs IF (Sweden)	9–0	(Estonia) Narva Trans	6–0	3–0
Keflavík (Iceland)	4–4 (a)	(Denmark) Midtjylland	3–2	1–2
BK Häcken (Sweden)	2–1	(Iceland) KR	1–1	1–0
St Patrick's Athletic (Republic of Ireland)	0–5	(Denmark) Odense	0–0	0–5
HJK (Finland)	3–0	(Luxembourg) Etzella Ettelbruck	2–0	1–0
Glentoran (Northern Ireland)	0–9	(Sweden) AIK	0–5	0–4
Skonto (Latvia)	1–3	(Belarus) Dinamo Minsk	1–1	0–2

=== Southern region matches ===
19 July 2007
20:30

Budućnost Podgorica (Montenegro)	1–1	(Croatia) Hajduk Split
Šćepanović 59'	Report	Hrgović 28'

Podgorica City Stadium, Podgorica
Attendance: 9,500
Referee: Asaf Kenan (Israel)
2 August 2007
20:15

Hajduk Split (Croatia)	1–0	(Montenegro) Budućnost Podgorica
Damjanović 46'	Report

Gradski stadion u Poljudu, Split
Attendance: 29,315
Referee: Christoforos Zografos (Greece)

Hajduk Split won 2–1 on aggregate.

19 July 2007
19:00

Omonia (Cyprus)	2–0	(Montenegro) Rudar Pljevlja
Kaiafas 43'; Chailis 46'	Report

GSP Stadium, Nicosia
Attendance: 10,697
Referee: Alexandru Deaconu (Romania)
2 August 2007
20:30

Rudar Pljevlja (Montenegro)	0–2	(Cyprus) Omonia
	Report	Mguni 34'; Sousa 75'

Podgorica City Stadium, Podgorica
Attendance: 1,000
Referee: Adrian Casha (Malta)

Omonia won 4–0 on aggregate.

19 July 2007
17:45

Slaven Belupo (Croatia)	6–2	(Albania) Teuta
Posavec 18' (pen.); Šehić 29', 47'; Vručina 60', 82'; Bošnjak 90'	Report	Xhafa 10'; Brahja 65'

Gradski stadion u Koprivnici, Koprivnica
Attendance: 860
Referee: Albert Toussaint (Luxembourg)
2 August 2007
16:30

Teuta (Albania)	2–2	(Croatia) Slaven Belupo
Kuli 45', 74'	Report	Kresinger 64'; Vručina 70'

Stadiumi Niko Dovana, Durrës
Attendance: 800
Referee: Panayiotis Kailis (Cyprus)

Slaven Belupo won 8–4 on aggregate.

19 July 2007
18:00

Bežanija (Serbia)	2–2	(Albania) Besa
Djalovic 37'; Ǵurovski 57' (pen.)	Report	Ishaka 49'; Endene 90'

Partizan Stadium, Belgrade (Note: This match was played at Partizan Stadium in Belgrade.)
Attendance: 619
Referee: Kuddusi Müftüoglu (Turkey)
2 August 2007
20:30

Besa (Albania)	0–0	(Serbia) Bežanija
	Report

Qemal Stafa, Tirana
Attendance: 6,000
Referee: Jorge Sousa (Portugal)

2–2 on aggregate; Besa won on away goals.

19 July 2007
19:30

Sliema Wanderers (Malta)	0–3	(Bulgaria) Litex Lovech
	Report	I. Popov 22', 56'; Beto 53'

Ta' Qali National Stadium, Ta' Qali
Attendance: 205
Referee: Rusmir Mrkovic (Bosnia and Herzegovina)
2 August 2007
20:30

Litex Lovech (Bulgaria)	4–0	(Malta) Sliema Wanderers
Boudarène 28'; Beto 40', 60'; I.Popov 59'	Report

Lovech Stadium, Lovech
Attendance: 3,900
Referee: Sergiy Berezka (Ukraine)

Litex Lovech won 7–0 on aggregate.

19 July 2007
17:30

Vojvodina (Serbia)	5–1	(Malta) Hibernians
Despotović 21', 42', 89'; Đurić 60'; Kačar 84'	Report	Doffo 86' (pen.)

Karađorđe Stadium, Novi Sad
Attendance: 2,000
Referee: Heraklis Tsikinis (Greece)
2 August 2007
18:00

Hibernians (Malta)	0–2	(Serbia) Vojvodina
	Report	Xuereb 30' (o.g.); Despotović 62'

Ta' Qali National Stadium, Ta' Qali
Attendance: 150
Referee: Simon Lee Evans (Wales)

Vojvodina won 7–1 on aggregate.

19 July 2007
17:00

FC Santa Coloma (Andorra)	1–0	(Israel) Maccabi Tel Aviv
Fernández 57'	Report

Estadi Comunal, Andorra la Vella
Attendance: 352
Referee: Ararat Tshagharyan (Armenia)
2 August 2007
18:30

Maccabi Tel Aviv (Israel)	4–0	(Andorra) FC Santa Coloma
Mesika 12', 25'; Shivhon 63'; Kamanan 71'	Report

Bloomfield Stadium, Tel Aviv
Attendance: 14,272
Referee: Pavel Saliy (Kazakhstan)

Maccabi Tel Aviv won 4–1 on aggregate.

19 July 2007
21:00

Široki Brijeg (Bosnia and Herzegovina)	3–1	(Slovenia) Koper
Celson 24', 33'; Ronielle 44'	Report	Viler 8'

Pecara Stadium, Široki Brijeg
Attendance: 3,489
Referee: Alexey Kulbakov (Belarus)
2 August 2007
20:00

Koper (Slovenia)	2–3	(Bosnia and Herzegovina) Široki Brijeg
Volaš 34'; Mejač 82'	Report	Karoglan 18'; Božič 25' (o.g.); Ronielle 36'

Arena Petrol, Celje
Attendance: 300
Referee: Jouni Hietala (Finland)

Široki Brijeg won 6–3 on aggregate.

19 July 2007
20:15

Vardar (North Macedonia)	0–1	(Cyprus) Anorthosis Famagusta
	Report	Deyanov 88'

Philip II Arena, Skopje
Attendance: 1,000
Referee: Serbastian Coltescu (Romania)
2 August 2007
19:00

Anorthosis Famagusta (Cyprus)	1–0	(North Macedonia) Vardar
Žlogar 53'	Report

Antonis Papadopoulos Stadium, Larnaca
Attendance: 9,600
Referee: Marek Mikołajewski (Poland)

Anorthosis Famagusta won 2–0 on aggregate.

19 July 2007
20:00

HIT Gorica (Slovenia)	1–2	(North Macedonia) Rabotnicki
Matavž 83'	Report	Šuler 79' (o.g.); Velkovski 90+1'

Stadion Športni Park, Nova Gorica
Attendance: 1,178
Referee: Haim Jakov (Israel)
2 August 2007
20:00

Rabotnicki (North Macedonia)	2–1	(Slovenia) HIT Gorica
Velkovski 44'; Demiri 68'	Report	Demirović 85' (pen.)

Philip II Arena, Skopje
Attendance: 2,000
Referee: George Vadachkoria (Georgia)

Rabotnicki won 4–2 on aggregate.

19 July 2007
20:15

Zrinjski Mostar (Bosnia and Herzegovina)	1–6	(Serbia) Partizan
Matko 68'	Report	Diarra 32', 60', 63'; Maletić 40'; Jovetić 48'; Lazetić 80'

Bijeli Brijeg Stadium, Mostar
Attendance: 7,920
Referee: Andrea De Marco (Italy)
2 August 2007
20:30

Partizan (Serbia)	5–0	(Bosnia and Herzegovina) Zrinjski Mostar
Maletić 4'; Moreira 32'; Jovetić 37', 51', 71'	Report

Partizan Stadium, Belgrade
Attendance: 10,300
Referee: Jan Jilek (Czech Republic)

Zrinjski Mostar won on walkover as Partizan were disqualified. (Note: UEFA expelled Partizan from the 2007–08 UEFA Cup due to crowd trouble at their away tie in Mostar, which forced the match to be interrupted for 10 minutes. UEFA adjudged travelling Partizan fans to have been the culprits of the trouble, but Partizan were allowed to play the return leg while the appeal was being processed. Therefore, Partizan initially won the tie 11–1 before a final decision was made. However, Partizan's appeal was rejected so Zrinjski Mostar advanced on a walkover.)

=== Central–East region matches ===
19 July 2007
17:00

ViOn Zlaté Moravce (Slovakia)	3–1	(Kazakhstan) Alma-Ata
Gibala 51', 78'; Greguska 71'	Report	Larin 82'

Štadión FC ViOn, Zlaté Moravce
Attendance: 2,880
Referee: Hannes Kaasik (Finland)
2 August 2007
15:30

Alma-Ata (Kazakhstan)	1–1	(Slovakia) ViOn Zlaté Moravce
Irismetov 58'	Report	Černák 77'

Almaty Central Stadium, Almaty
Attendance: 12,000
Referee: Dragomir Stanković (Serbia)

ViOn Zlaté Moravce won 4–2 on aggregate.

19 July 2007
20:30

MTK Budapest (Hungary)	2–1	(Armenia) Mika
Pintér 20'; Urbán 57'	Report	Rodrigues 45'

Szusza Ferenc Stadium, Budapest (Note: This match was played at Szusza Ferenc Stadium in Budapest because MTK Budapest's ground in Budapest does not meet UEFA standards.)
Attendance: 1,050
Referee: Garðar Örn Hinriksson (Iceland)
2 August 2007
20:30

Mika (Armenia)	1–0	(Hungary) MTK Budapest
Adamyan 26'	Report

Hanrapetakan Stadium, Yerevan
Attendance: 6,000
Referee: Augustus Viorel Constantin (Romania)

2–2 on aggregate; Mika won on away goals.

19 July 2007
16:45

MKT Araz (Azerbaijan)	0–0	(Poland) Groclin Grodzisk Wielkopolski
	Report

Tofik Bakhramov Stadium, Baku
Attendance: 3,500
Referee: Valery Vialichka (Belarus)
2 August 2007
20:45

Groclin Grodzisk Wielkopolski (Poland)	1–0	(Azerbaijan) MKT Araz
Kłodawski 88'	Report

Stadion Dyskobolia, Grodzisk Wielkopolski
Attendance: 3,353
Referee: Svein Oddvar Moen (Norway)

Groclin Grodzisk Wielkopolski won 1–0 on aggregate.

19 July 2007
20:45

Bełchatów (Poland)	2–0	(Georgia (country)) Ameri Tbilisi
Pietrasiak 51', 82'	Report

Stadion GKS, Bełchatów
Attendance: 3,000
Referee: Tony Chapron (France)
2 August 2007
15:45

Ameri Tbilisi (Georgia (country))	2–0 (a.e.t.)	(Poland) Bełchatów
Tatanashvilli 12'; Davitashvili 46'	Report
Penalties
Khvadagiani (penalty scored); Gotsiridze (penalty missed); Davitnidze (penalty missed); Tatanashvilli (penalty scored)	2–4	(penalty scored) Strak; (penalty scored) Popek; (penalty scored) Stolarczyk; (penalty scored) Wróbel

Mikheil Meskhi Stadium, Tbilisi
Attendance: 1,009
Referee: Igor Kister (Kazakhstan)

2–2 on aggregate; Bełchatów won 4–2 on penalties.

19 July 2007
20:00

Artmedia Petržalka (Slovakia)	1–1	(Moldova) Zimbru Chișinău
Ďurica 21' (pen.)	Report	Zhdanov 70' (pen.)

NTC Senec, Senec
Attendance: 2,151
Referee: Marijo Strahonja (Croatia)
2 August 2007
18:00

Zimbru Chișinău (Moldova)	2–2	(Slovakia) Artmedia Petržalka
Kovalchuk 34'; Zhdanov 60' (pen.)	Report	Guédé 73'; Borbély 90+4'

Zimbru Stadium, Chişinău
Attendance: 6,500
Referee: Alfonso Perez Burrull (Spain)

3–3 on aggregate; Artmedia Petržalka won on away goals.

19 July 2007
19:00

Banants (Armenia)	1–1	(Switzerland) Young Boys
Kakosyan 68'	Report	Mangane 17'

Hanrapetakan Stadium, Yerevan
Attendance: 3,500
Referee: Vlado Svilokos (Croatia)
2 August 2007
19:30

Young Boys (Switzerland)	4–0	(Armenia) Banants
João Paulo 11', 41'; Tiago 21'; Schneuwly 58'	Report

Stade de Suisse, Bern
Attendance: 5,478
Referee: Ghennadi Sidenco (Moldova)

Young Boys won 5–1 on aggregate.

19 July 2007
18:00

Nistru Otaci (Moldova)	1–1	(Hungary) Honvéd
Malitski 29'	Report	Abraham 51'

Zimbru Stadium, Chişinău (Note: This match was played at Zimbru Stadium in Chişinău because FC Nistru Otaci's ground in Otaci does not meet UEFA standards.)
Attendance: 1,500
Referee: Bülent Demirlek (Turkey)
2 August 2007
20:30

Honvéd (Hungary)	1–1 (a.e.t.)	(Moldova) Nistru Otaci
Abraham 14'	Report	Habib 50'
Penalties
Baranyos (penalty scored); Genito (penalty missed); Iváncsics (penalty scored); Diego (penalty missed); Pomper (penalty missed); Angoua (penalty scored); Smiljanic (penalty missed); Koós (penalty scored); Schindler (penalty scored)	5–4	(penalty missed) Mațiura; (penalty scored) Dolgov; (penalty missed) Mukhovykov; (penalty scored) Butelschi; (penalty missed) Savchuk; (penalty scored) Habib; (penalty missed) Țaranu; (penalty scored) Sangare; (penalty missed) Hroshev

Bozsik Stadion, Budapest
Attendance: 3,023
Referee: Michael Svendsen (Denmark)

2–2 on aggregate; Honvéd won 5–4 on penalties.

19 July 2007
20:30

Ried (Austria)	3–1	(Azerbaijan) Neftçi
Drechsel 2'; Brenner 87'; Salihi 90'	Report	Aliyev 14'

Fill Metallbau Stadion, Ried im Innkreis
Attendance: 2,033
Referee: Antonio Rubinos Perez (Spain)
2 August 2007
18:00

Neftçi (Azerbaijan)	2–1	(Austria) Ried
Subašić 14'; Sadygov 21'	Report	Salihi 85'

Tofik Bakhramov Stadium, Baku
Attendance: 25,000
Referee: Hristo Ristoskov (Bulgaria)

Ried won 4–3 on aggregate.

19 July 2007
15:00

Dinamo Tbilisi (Georgia (country))	2–0	(Liechtenstein) Vaduz
Merebashvili 66' (pen.); Akieremy 72'	Report

Mikheil Meskhi Stadium, Tbilisi
Attendance: 1,150
Referee: Csaba Sapi (Hungary)
2 August 2007
19:30

Vaduz (Liechtenstein)	0–0	(Georgia (country)) Dinamo Tbilisi
	Report

Rheinpark Stadion, Vaduz
Attendance: 755
Referee: Ante Vucemilovic-Simunovic (Croatia)

Dinamo Tbilisi won 2–0 on aggregate.

19 July 2007
18:30

Aktobe (Kazakhstan)	1–0	(Austria) Mattersburg
Khairullin 85'	Report

Aktobe Central Stadium, Aktobe
Attendance: 13,000
Referee: Fırat Aydınus (Turkey)
2 August 2007
19:30

Mattersburg (Austria)	4–2	(Kazakhstan) Aktobe
Jancker 22'; Wagner 62'; Csizmadia 67'; Kovrig 90+2'	Report	Bogomolov 71'; Kosolapov 77'

Pappelstadion, Mattersburg
Attendance: 3,700
Referee: Anders Hermansen (Denmark)

Mattersburg won 4–3 on aggregate.

=== Northern region matches ===
19 July 2007
19:00

B36 (Faroe Islands)	1–3	(Lithuania) Ekranas
Højsted 41'	Report	Lukšys 11'; Paulauskas 45'; Pogreban 67'

Tórsvøllur, Tórshavn
Attendance: 590
Referee: Matej Jug (Slovenia)
2 August 2007
17:00

Ekranas (Lithuania)	3–2	(Faroe Islands) B36
Šidlauskas 51'; Lukšys 77', 87'	Report	Midjord 85'; Benjaminsen 86' (pen.)

Aukštaitija Stadium, Panevėžys
Attendance: 2,800
Referee: Gabriele Rossi (San Marino)

Ekranas won 6–3 on aggregate.

19 July 2007
21:00

Libertas (San Marino)	1–1	(Republic of Ireland) Drogheda United
Pari 77'	Report	Zayed 44'

Stadio Olimpico, Serravalle
Attendance: 1,080
Referee: Albano Janku (Albania)
2 August 2007
20:45

Drogheda United (Republic of Ireland)	3–0	(San Marino) Libertas
Keegan 11', 48'; Stuart Byrne (footballer) 57'	Report

Dalymount Park, Dublin
Attendance: 1,850
Referee: Luc Wouters (Belgium)

Drogheda United won 4–1 on aggregate.

19 July 2007
20:30

Rhyl (Wales)	3–1	(Finland) Haka
Moran 26'; Hunt 36'; Garside 47'	Report	Lehtinen 15'

Belle Vue, Rhyl
Attendance: 1,778
Referee: Peter Vervecken (Belgium)
2 August 2007
18:00

Haka (Finland)	2–0	(Wales) Rhyl
Innanen 62'; Popovitch 64'	Report

Tehtaan kenttä, Valkeakoski
Attendance: 1,565
Referee: Alexei Nikolaev (Russia)

3–3 on aggregate; Haka won on away goals.

19 July 2007
20:00

Carmarthen Town (Wales)	0–8	(Norway) Brann
	Report	Winters 8', 30', 45'; Helstad 17', 28'; Sigurðsson 70'; Solli 83'; A. Björnsson 90+1'

Richmond Park, Carmarthen
Attendance: 769
Referee: Vitaliy Godulyan (Ukraine)
2 August 2007
19:00

Brann (Norway)	6–3	(Wales) Carmarthen Town
Vaagan Moen 9'; A.Björnsson 19'; Winters 27', 32'; Sigurðsson 56'; Hanstveit 57'	Report	Thomas 36'; Hicks 47', 90'

Brann Stadion, Bergen
Attendance: 4,800
Referee: Robert Schörgenhofer (Austria)

Brann won 14–3 on aggregate.

19 July 2007
17:45

Flora (Estonia)	0–1	(Norway) Vålerenga
	Report	Lange 31'

A. Le Coq Arena, Tallinn
Attendance: 1,200
Referee: Anthony Buttimer (Republic of Ireland)
2 August 2007
19:00

Vålerenga (Norway)	1–0	(Estonia) Flora
Berre 90+2'	Report

Ullevaal Stadion, Oslo
Attendance: 4,290
Referee: Jiri Jech (Czech Republic)

Vålerenga won 2–0 on aggregate.

19 July 2007
18:00

MYPA (Finland)	1–0	(Faroe Islands) EB/Streymur
Hyyrynen 11'	Report

Saviniemi, Anjalankoski
Attendance: 1,481
Referee: Ferenc Bede (Hungary)
2 August 2007
20:00

EB/Streymur (Faroe Islands)	1–1	(Finland) MYPA
Potemkin 86'	Report	Kuparinen 70'

Tórsvøllur, Tórshavn
Attendance: 1,175
Referee: David McKeon (Republic of Ireland)

MYPA won 2–1 on aggregate.

19 July 2007
20:45

Dungannon Swifts (Northern Ireland)	1–0	(Lithuania) Sūduva
McAllister 17'	Report

Windsor Park, Belfast
Attendance: 301
Referee: Thomas Vejlgaard (Denmark)
2 August 2007
17:00

Sūduva (Lithuania)	4–0	(Northern Ireland) Dungannon Swifts
Grigas 29'; Urbšys 50', 55', 84'	Report

Sūduva Stadium, Marijampolė
Attendance: 2,500
Referee: Svein-Erik Edvartsen (Norway)

Sūduva won 4–1 on aggregate.

19 July 2007
19:00

Lillestrøm (Norway)	2–1	(Luxembourg) Käerjéng 97
Occean 19'; Sundgot 45' (pen.)	Report	Andresen 45' (o.g.)

Åråsen, Lillestrøm
Attendance: 1,562
Referee: Mark Whitby (Wales)
31 July 2007
20:00

Käerjéng 97 (Luxembourg)	1–0	(Norway) Lillestrøm
Boulahfari 49'	Report

Stade Josy Barthel, Luxembourg City
Attendance: 629
Referee: Babak Guliyev (Azerbaijan)

2–2 on aggregate; Käerjéng 97 won on away goals.

19 July 2007
18:30

Liepājas Metalurgs (Latvia)	1–1	(Belarus) Dynamo Brest
Antonio Ferreira 5'	Report	Sokal 77'

Daugava Stadium, Liepāja
Attendance: 3,000
Referee: Luc Wouters (Belgium)
2 August 2007
18:30

Dynamo Brest (Belarus)	1–2	(Latvia) Liepājas Metalurgs
Sokal 47'	Report	Kruhlyak 40'; Karlsons 50'

Regional Sport Complex Brestskiy, Brest
Attendance: 10,800
Referee: Ninoslav Spasić (Serbia)

Liepājas Metalurgs won 3–2 on aggregate.

19 July 2007
19:00

Helsingborgs IF (Sweden)	6–0	(Estonia) Narva Trans
Omotoyossi 28'; Dahl 30'; Larsson 59', 64'; Karekezi 80'; Andersson 84'	Report

Olympia, Helsingborg
Attendance: 5,071
Referee: Igor Zakharov (Russia)
2 August 2007
17:00

Narva Trans (Estonia)	0–3	(Sweden) Helsingborgs IF
	Report	Wahlstedt 18'; Svanbäck 32'; Unkuri 76'

A. Le Coq Arena, Tallinn
Attendance: 150
Referee: Joeri Van De Velde (Belgium)

Helsingborgs IF won 9–0 on aggregate.

19 July 2007
21:15

Keflavík (Iceland)	3–2	(Denmark) Midtjylland
Steinarsson 27'; Troest 34' (o.g.); Samuelsen 57'	Report	Dadu 9'; Afriyie 20'

Keflavíkurvöllur, Keflavík
Attendance: 827
Referee: Carlo Bertolini (Switzerland)
2 August 2007
19:00

Midtjylland (Denmark)	2–1	(Iceland) Keflavík
S. Poulsen 68'; Dadu 75'	Report	Sigurðsson 1'

MCH Arena, Herning
Attendance: 6,125
Referee: Adrian McCourt (Northern Ireland)

4–4 on aggregate; Midtjylland won on away goals.

19 July 2007
20:00

BK Häcken (Sweden)	1–1	(Iceland) KR
Heden 12'	Report	Petursson 69'

Ullevi, Gothenburg
Attendance: 7,230
Referee: Paulius Malžinskas (Lithuania)
2 August 2007
20:45

KR (Iceland)	0–1	(Sweden) BK Häcken
	Report	Paulinho 83'

KR-völlur, Reykjavík
Attendance: 1,357
Referee: Aleksandr Gvardis (Russia)

BK Häcken won 2–1 on aggregate.

19 July 2007
20:45

St Patrick's Athletic (Republic of Ireland)	0–0	(Denmark) Odense
	Report

Richmond Park, Dublin
Attendance: 1,900
Referee: Fredy Fautrel (France)
2 August 2007
19:00

Odense (Denmark)	5–0	(Republic of Ireland) St Patrick's Athletic
Andreasen 20'; Christensen 29', 73'; Borring 45'; Nymann 89'	Report

Fionia Park, Odense
Attendance: 5,306
Referee: Kevin Blom (Netherlands)

Odense won 5–0 on aggregate.

19 July 2007
18:00

HJK (Finland)	2–0	(Luxembourg) Etzella Ettelbruck
Bah 24'; Sorsa 90+1'	Report

Finnair Stadium, Helsinki
Attendance: 1,752
Referee: Audrius Žuta (Lithuania)
2 August 2007
18:30

Etzella Ettelbruck (Luxembourg)	0–1	(Finland) HJK
	Report	Savolainen 26' (pen.)

Stade Am Deich, Ettelbruck
Attendance: 476
Referee: Ihor Ishchenko (Ukraine)

HJK won 3–0 on aggregate.

19 July 2007
20:45

Glentoran (Northern Ireland)	0–5	(Sweden) AIK
	Report	Figueiredo 21', 62'; Valdemarín 68'; Stephenson 73'; Johnson 84'

The Oval, Belfast
Attendance: 2,033
Referee: Andrejs Sipailo (Latvia)
2 August 2007
20:00

AIK (Sweden)	4–0	(Northern Ireland) Glentoran
Özkan 27'; Karlsson 24'; Gerndt 88'; Johnson 89'	Report

Råsunda Stadium, Solna
Attendance: 8,707
Referee: René Rogalla (Switzerland)

AIK won 9–0 on aggregate.

19 July 2007
18:35

Skonto (Latvia)	1–1	(Belarus) Dinamo Minsk
Perepļotkins 27'	Report	Rák 11'

Skonto stadions, Riga
Attendance: 2,500
Referee: Cyril Zimmermann (Switzerland)
2 August 2007
17:30

Dinamo Minsk (Belarus)	2–0	(Latvia) Skonto
Rák 54', 74'	Report

Dinamo Stadium, Minsk
Attendance: 3,041
Referee: Daniel Stalhammar (Sweden)

Dinamo Minsk won 3–1 on aggregate.

== Second qualifying round ==
=== Summary ===
The draw, which was conducted by UEFA General Secretary David Taylor and Giorgio Marchetti, UEFA's director of professional football, was held on Friday, 3 August 2007 at 13:00 CET in Nyon, Switzerland. The matches were played on 16 and 30 August 2007.

Team 1	Agg.	Team 2	1st leg	2nd leg
Southern region
Lokomotiv Sofia (Bulgaria)	3–1	(Romania) Oțelul Galați	3–1	0–0
CFR Cluj (Romania)	1–3	(Cyprus) Anorthosis Famagusta	1–3	0–0
Rabotnicki (North Macedonia)	2–1	(Bosnia and Herzegovina) Zrinjski Mostar	0–0	2–1
Slaven Belupo (Croatia)	2–4	(Turkey) Galatasaray	1–2	1–2
União de Leiria (Portugal)	1–0	(Israel) Maccabi Netanya	0–0	1–0
Hajduk Split (Croatia)	1–2	(Italy) Sampdoria	0–1	1–1
Besa (Albania)	0–6	(Bulgaria) Litex Lovech	0–3	0–3
Maccabi Tel Aviv (Israel)	2–4	(Turkey) Kayseri Erciyesspor	1–1	1–3
Atlético Madrid (Spain)	5–1	(Serbia) Vojvodina	3–0	2–1
Široki Brijeg (Bosnia and Herzegovina)	0–6	(Israel) Hapoel Tel Aviv	0–3	0–3
Omonia (Cyprus)	2–3	(Bulgaria) CSKA Sofia	1–1	1–2
Central–East region
Basel (Switzerland)	6–1	(Austria) Mattersburg	2–1	4–0
Ried (Austria)	1–4	(Switzerland) Sion	1–1	0–3
Mika (Armenia)	2–3	(Slovakia) Artmedia Petržalka	2–1	0–2
Dnipro Dnipropetrovsk (Ukraine)	5–3	(Poland) Bełchatów	1–1	4–2
Honvéd (Hungary)	0–4	(Germany) Hamburger SV	0–0	0–4
Young Boys (Switzerland)	2–6	(France) Lens	1–1	1–5
Tobol (Kazakhstan)	0–3	(Poland) Groclin Grodzisk Wielkopolski	0–1	0–2
Austria Wien	5–4	(Czech Republic) Jablonec	4–3	1–1
ViOn Zlaté Moravce (Slovakia)	0–5	(Russia) Zenit Saint Petersburg	0–2	0–3
Dinamo Tbilisi (Georgia (country))	0–8	(Austria) Rapid Wien	0–3	0–5
Northern region
MYPA (Finland)	0–3	(England) Blackburn Rovers	0–1	0–2
Drogheda United (Republic of Ireland)	1–4	(Sweden) Helsingborgs IF	1–1	0–3
Liepājas Metalurgs (Latvia)	3–4	(Sweden) AIK	3–2	0–2
HJK (Finland)	2–4	(Denmark) AaB	2–1	0–3
Ekranas (Lithuania)	1–7	(Norway) Vålerenga	1–1	0–6
Dunfermline Athletic (Scotland)	1–2	(Sweden) BK Häcken	1–1	0–1
Brann (Norway)	6–4	(Lithuania) Sūduva	2–1	4–3
Haka (Finland)	3–7	(Denmark) Midtjylland	1–2	2–5
Dinamo Minsk (Belarus)	1–5	(Denmark) Odense	1–1	0–4
Käerjéng 97 (Luxembourg)	0–4	(Belgium) Standard Liège	0–3	0–1
Hammarby IF (Sweden)	3–2	(Norway) Fredrikstad	2–1	1–1

=== Southern region matches ===
16 August 2007
19:30

Lokomotiv Sofia (Bulgaria)	3–1	(Romania) Oțelul Galați
Dafchev 19'; Baldovaliev 62'; Đilas 84'	Report	Semeghin 74'

Balgarska Armiya Stadium, Sofia
Attendance: 1,500
Referee: Jouni Hyytiä (Finland)
30 August 2007
16:00

Oțelul Galați (Romania)	0–0	(Bulgaria) Lokomotiv Sofia
	Report

Stadionul Oțelul, Galați
Attendance: 8,005
Referee: Paulo Costa (Portugal)

Lokomotiv Sofia won 3–1 on aggregate.

16 August 2007
19:30

CFR Cluj (Romania)	1–3	(Cyprus) Anorthosis Famagusta
Trică 69' (pen.)	Report	Žlogar 43'; Boaventura 48'; Sosin 58'

Stadionul Dr. Constantin Rădulescu, Cluj-Napoca
Attendance: 7,100
Referee: Carlo Bertolini (Switzerland)
30 August 2007
19:00

Anorthosis Famagusta (Cyprus)	0–0	(Romania) CFR Cluj
	Report

Antonis Papadopoulos Stadium, Larnaca
Attendance: 9,400
Referee: Mike Dean (England)

Anorthosis Famagusta won 3–1 on aggregate.

16 August 2007
20:00

Rabotnicki (North Macedonia)	0–0	(Bosnia and Herzegovina) Zrinjski Mostar
	Report

Philip II Arena, Skopje
Attendance: 5,500
Referee: Pavel Olsiak (Slovakia)
30 August 2007
20:30

Zrinjski Mostar (Bosnia and Herzegovina)	1–2	(North Macedonia) Rabotnicki
Ivanković 36'	Report	Milisavljević 33'; Stanišić 90+2'

Bijeli Brijeg Stadium, Mostar
Attendance: 1,500
Referee: Michael Svendsen (Denmark)

Rabotnicki won 2–1 on aggregate.

16 August 2007
18:30

Slaven Belupo (Croatia)	1–2	(Turkey) Galatasaray
Posavec 16'	Report	Akman 42'; Yaman 72'

Gradski stadion u Koprivnici, Koprivnica
Attendance: 2,730
Referee: Stéphane Lannoy (France)
30 August 2007
20:00

Galatasaray (Turkey)	2–1	(Croatia) Slaven Belupo
Karan 9'; Şükür 37'	Report	Poljak 36'

Ali Sami Yen Stadium, Istanbul
Attendance: 2,100
Referee: Nicola Rizzoli (Italy)

Galatasaray won 4–2 on aggregate.

16 August 2007
20:45

União de Leiria (Portugal)	0–0	(Israel) Maccabi Netanya
	Report

Estádio Dr. Magalhães Pessoa, Leiria
Attendance: 1,945
Referee: William Collum (Scotland)
30 August 2007
19:30

Maccabi Netanya (Israel)	0–1	(Portugal) União de Leiria
	Report	N'Gal 84'

Kiryat Eliezer Stadium, Haifa
Attendance: 7,100
Referee: Sorin Corpodean (Romania)

União de Leiria won 1–0 on aggregate.

16 August 2007
20:45

Hajduk Split (Croatia)	0–1	(Italy) Sampdoria
	Report	Campagnaro 44'

Gradski stadion u Poljudu, Split
Attendance: 28,710
Referee: Bruno Paixão (Portugal)
30 August 2007
20:45

Sampdoria (Italy)	1–1	(Croatia) Hajduk Split
Montella 34' (pen.)	Report	Hrgović 83'

Stadio Luigi Ferraris, Genoa
Attendance: 21,700
Referee: Pavel Královec (Czech Republic)

Sampdoria won 2–1 on aggregate.

16 August 2007
17:00

Besa (Albania)	0–3	(Bulgaria) Litex Lovech
	Report	I.Popov 13', 20'; Beto 32'

Stadiumi Niko Dovana, Durrës
Attendance: 4,000
Referee: Paolo Dondarini (Italy)
30 August 2007
19:30

Litex Lovech (Bulgaria)	3–0	(Albania) Besa
Genchev 13'; Beto 69'; Dudu 79'	Report

Lovech Stadium, Lovech
Attendance: 1,210
Referee: Asaf Kenan (Israel)

Litex Lovech won 6–0 on aggregate.

16 August 2007
18:30

Maccabi Tel Aviv (Israel)	1–1	(Turkey) Kayseri Erciyesspor
Kamanan 42'	Report	Özbay 5'

Bloomfield Stadium, Tel Aviv
Attendance: 8,003
Referee: Igor Egorov (Russia)
30 August 2007
18:00

Kayseri Erciyesspor (Turkey)	3–1	(Israel) Maccabi Tel Aviv
Özbay 7'; Köksal 14'; Öztekin 72'	Report	Haddad 40'

Kayseri Atatürk Stadium, Kayseri
Attendance: 11,470
Referee: Alexandru Tudor (Romania)

Kayseri Erciyesspor won 4–2 on aggregate.

16 August 2007
22:00

Atlético Madrid (Spain)	3–0	(Serbia) Vojvodina
Rodríguez 37'; Forlán 62'; Agüero 70'	Report

Vicente Calderón, Madrid
Attendance: 33,000
Referee: Claudio Circhetta (Switzerland)
30 August 2007
16:30

Vojvodina (Serbia)	1–2	(Spain) Atlético Madrid
Buač 39'	Report	L. García 54'; R. García 75'

Karađorđe Stadium, Novi Sad
Attendance: 2,200
Referee: Felix Brych (Germany)

Atlético Madrid won 5–1 on aggregate.

16 August 2007
20:00

Široki Brijeg (Bosnia and Herzegovina)	0–3	(Israel) Hapoel Tel Aviv
	Report	Abedi 14'; Asulin 32'; Gabriel Santos 74'

Pecara Stadium, Široki Brijeg
Attendance: 3,000
Referee: Levan Paniashvili (Georgia)
30 August 2007
19:50

Hapoel Tel Aviv (Israel)	3–0	(Bosnia and Herzegovina) Široki Brijeg
Asulin 41'; Badir 50'; Natcho 75'	Report

Bloomfield Stadium, Tel Aviv
Attendance: 5,337
Referee: Zsolt Szabó (Hungary)

Hapoel Tel Aviv won 6–0 on aggregate.

16 August 2007
19:00

Omonia (Cyprus)	1–1	(Bulgaria) CSKA Sofia
Kaiafas 14'	Report	Nei 1'

GSP Stadium, Nicosia
Attendance: 13,140
Referee: Martin Atkinson (England)
30 August 2007
19:30

CSKA Sofia (Bulgaria)	2–1	(Cyprus) Omonia
Nei 17'; Chilikov 88'	Report	Magno 8'

Balgarska Armiya Stadium, Sofia
Attendance: 14,320
Referee: Serge Gumienny (Belgium)

CSKA Sofia won 3–2 on aggregate.

=== Central–East region matches ===
16 August 2007
20:15

Basel (Switzerland)	2–1	(Austria) Mattersburg
Ergić 23'; Caicedo 53'	Report	Nakata 20' (o.g.)

St. Jakob-Park, Basel
Attendance: 9,203
Referee: Martin Ingvarsson (Sweden)
30 August 2007
18:15

Mattersburg (Austria)	0–4	(Switzerland) Basel
	Report	Caicedo 22'; Ergić 36'; Streller 41'; Carlitos 53'

Pappelstadion, Mattersburg
Attendance: 4,600
Referee: Selçuk Dereli (Turkey)

Basel won 6–1 on aggregate.

16 August 2007
18:00

Ried (Austria)	1–1	(Switzerland) Sion
Dospel 66'	Report	Saborío 90+2'

Fill Metallbau Stadion, Ried im Innkreis
Attendance: 2,000
Referee: Iain Brines (Scotland)
30 August 2007
20:15

Sion (Switzerland)	3–0	(Austria) Ried
Obradović 40'; Zakrzewski 44'; Domínguez 47'	Report

Stade de Genève, Geneva
Attendance: 4,500
Referee: Tony Asumaa (Finland)

Sion won 4–1 on aggregate.

16 August 2007
16:00

Mika (Armenia)	2–1	(Slovakia) Artmedia Petržalka
Shahgeldyan 8'; Alex 80'	Report	Fodrek 66'

Hanrapetakan Stadium, Yerevan
Attendance: 7,500
Referee: Dragomir Stanković (Serbia)
30 August 2007
19:00

Artmedia Petržalka (Slovakia)	2–0	(Armenia) Mika
Obžera 5', 72'	Report

NTC Senec, Senec
Attendance: 1,400
Referee: Tommy Skjerven (Norway)

Artmedia Petržalka won 3–2 on aggregate.

16 August 2007
19:15

Dnipro Dnipropetrovsk (Ukraine)	1–1	(Poland) Bełchatów
Nazarenko 80'	Report	Ujek 18'

Meteor Stadium, Dnipropetrovsk
Attendance: 15,000
Referee: Cüneyt Çakır (Turkey)
30 August 2007
20:45

Bełchatów (Poland)	2–4	(Ukraine) Dnipro Dnipropetrovsk
Stolarczyk 10' (pen.); Nowak 21'	Report	Kravchenko 7'; Shelayev 32'; Samodin 33'; Kornilenko 40'

Stadion GKS, Bełchatów
Attendance: 3,600
Referee: Stefan Messner (Austria)

Dnipro Dnipropetrovsk won 5–3 on aggregate.

16 August 2007
19:00

Honvéd (Hungary)	0–0	(Germany) Hamburger SV
	Report

Szusza Ferenc Stadium, Budapest
Attendance: 7,000
Referee: Björn Kuipers (Netherlands)
30 August 2007
20:30

Hamburger SV (Germany)	4–0	(Hungary) Honvéd
Guerrero 9', 38'; Smiljanić 50' (o.g.); Choupo-Moting 90'	Report

HSH Nordbank Arena, Hamburg
Attendance: 42,090
Referee: Julián Rodríguez Santiago (Spain)

Hamburger SV won 4–0 on aggregate.

16 August 2007
19:30

Young Boys (Switzerland)	1–1	(France) Lens
Tiago 71'	Report	Monterrubio 75'

Stade de Suisse, Bern
Attendance: 13,411
Referee: Brage Sandmoen (Norway)
30 August 2007
19:00

Lens (France)	5–1	(Switzerland) Young Boys
Dindane 13', 58'; Akalé 16'; Carrière 67'; Feindouno 89'	Report	Varela 32'

Stade Félix-Bollaert, Lens
Attendance: 31,088
Referee: Mark Clattenburg (England)

Lens won 6–2 on aggregate.

16 August 2007
15:30

Tobol (Kazakhstan)	0–1	(Poland) Groclin Grodzisk Wielkopolski
	Report	Muszalik 4'

Kostanay Central Stadium, Kostanay
Attendance: 8,000
Referee: Peter Sippel (Germany)
30 August 2007
16:45

Groclin Grodzisk Wielkopolski (Poland)	2–0	(Kazakhstan) Tobol
Sikora 5', 19'	Report

Stadion Dyskobolia, Grodzisk Wielkopolski
Attendance: 2,082
Referee: Stefan Johannesson (Sweden)

Groclin Grodzisk Wielkopolski won 3–0 on aggregate.

16 August 2007
20:30

Austria Wien	4–3	(Czech Republic) Jablonec
Ertl 8'; Kuljić 20', 64'; Lasnik 47'	Report	Zelenka 28', 36'; Baranek 76'

Franz Horr Stadium, Vienna
Attendance: 4,912
Referee: Carlos Megía Dávila (Spain)
30 August 2007
18:15

Jablonec (Czech Republic)	1–1	Austria Wien
Rilke 83'	Report	Sariyar 39'

Stadion Střelnice, Jablonec nad Nisou
Attendance: 5,710
Referee: Georgios Kasnaferis (Greece)

Austria Wien won 5–4 on aggregate.

16 August 2007
17:00

ViOn Zlaté Moravce (Slovakia)	0–2	(Russia) Zenit Saint Petersburg
	Report	Hagen 38'; Ionov 90+2'

Štadión FC ViOn, Zlaté Moravce
Attendance: 3,368
Referee: Peter Rasmussen (Denmark)
30 August 2007
17:30

Zenit Saint Petersburg (Russia)	3–0	(Slovakia) ViOn Zlaté Moravce
Pogrebnyak 10'; Maksimov 61'; Kim 71'	Report

Petrovsky Stadium, Saint Petersburg
Attendance: 11,992
Referee: Ruud Bossen (Netherlands)

Zenit Saint Petersburg won 5–0 on aggregate.

16 August 2007
15:00

Dinamo Tbilisi (Georgia (country))	0–3	(Austria) Rapid Wien
	Report	Fabiano 24'; Hofmann 39'; Bazina 53'

Mikheil Meskhi Stadium, Tbilisi
Attendance: 3,950
Referee: Tomasz Mikulski (Poland)
30 August 2007
20:30

Rapid Wien (Austria)	5–0	(Georgia (country)) Dinamo Tbilisi
Bazina 30'; Bilić 54'; Hofmann 59', 75' (pen.); Kavlak 73'	Report

Gerhard Hanappi Stadium, Vienna
Attendance: 12,600
Referee: Panayiotis Kailis (Cyprus)

Rapid Wien won 8–0 on aggregate.

=== Northern region matches ===
16 August 2007
16:55

MYPA (Finland)	0–1	(England) Blackburn Rovers
	Report	Santa Cruz 6'

Saviniemi, Anjalankoski
Attendance: 3,340
Referee: Olivier Thual (France)
30 August 2007
21:05

Blackburn Rovers (England)	2–0	(Finland) MYPA
Bentley 48'; Roberts 90+1'	Report

Ewood Park, Blackburn
Attendance: 13,490
Referee: Thomas Einwaller (Austria)

Blackburn Rovers won 3–0 on aggregate.

16 August 2007
20:45

Drogheda United (Republic of Ireland)	1–1	(Sweden) Helsingborgs IF
Zayed 54'	Report	Larsson 34'

Dalymount Park, Dublin
Attendance: 5,100
Referee: Sten Kaldma (Estonia)
30 August 2007
20:30

Helsingborgs IF (Sweden)	3–0	(Republic of Ireland) Drogheda United
Jakobsson 52'; Omotoyossi 68'; Karekezi 90+1'	Report

Olympia, Helsingborg
Attendance: 4,767
Referee: Vitaliy Godulyan (Ukraine)

Helsingborgs IF won 4–1 on aggregate.

16 August 2007
18:30

Liepājas Metalurgs (Latvia)	3–2	(Sweden) AIK
Karlsons 20'; Ivanovs 43'; Tamošauskas 63'	Report	Ivanovs 49' (o.g.); Obolo 61'

Daugava Stadium, Liepāja
Attendance: 2,280
Referee: Tsvetan Georgiev (Bulgaria)
30 August 2007
18:30

AIK (Sweden)	2–0	(Latvia) Liepājas Metalurgs
Figueiredo 43', 54'	Report

Råsunda Stadium, Solna
Attendance: 7,528
Referee: Ceri Richards (Wales)

AIK won 4–3 on aggregate.

16 August 2007
18:00

HJK (Finland)	2–1	(Denmark) AaB
Samura 15', 56'	Report	Risgård 37'

Finnair Stadium, Helsinki
Attendance: 4,912
Referee: Radek Matejek (Czech Republic)
30 August 2007
19:30

AaB (Denmark)	3–0	(Finland) HJK
Enevoldsen 7'; Johansson 26'; Curth 43'	Report

Aalborg Stadion, Aalborg
Attendance: 3,902
Referee: David Malcolm (Northern Ireland)

AaB won 4–2 on aggregate.

16 August 2007
17:00

Ekranas (Lithuania)	1–1	(Norway) Vålerenga
Bička 45+1' (pen.)	Report	Dos Santos 76'

Aukštaitija Stadium, Panevėžys
Attendance: 3,300
Referee: Jacek Granat (Poland)
30 August 2007
19:00

Vålerenga (Norway)	6–0	(Lithuania) Ekranas
Grindheim 5', 45+1'; Sørensen 42'; Horn 67'; Storbæk 81'; Brix 90+1'	Report

Ullevaal Stadion, Oslo
Attendance: 2,939
Referee: István Vad (Hungary)

Vålerenga won 7–1 on aggregate.

16 August 2007
20:45

Dunfermline Athletic (Scotland)	1–1	(Sweden) BK Häcken
Hamilton 1'	Report	Henriksson 57'

East End Park, Dunfermline
Attendance: 6,017
Referee: Robert Krajnc (Slovenia)
30 August 2007
20:00

BK Häcken (Sweden)	1–0	(Scotland) Dunfermline Athletic
Skúlason 27'	Report

Ullevi, Gothenburg
Attendance: 2,712
Referee: Richard Havrilla (Slovakia)

BK Häcken won 2–1 on aggregate.

16 August 2007
19:00

Brann (Norway)	2–1	(Lithuania) Sūduva
Björnsson 24'; Winters 49'	Report	Negreiros 56' (pen.)

Brann Stadion, Bergen
Attendance: 7,400
Referee: Luc Wilmes (Luxembourg)
30 August 2007
16:00

Sūduva (Lithuania)	3–4	(Norway) Brann
Urbsys 46'; Maciulevičius 78'; Otavio 84'	Report	Moen 37'; Björnsson 45'; Solli 57'; Huseklepp 63'

Sūduva Stadium, Marijampolė
Attendance: 2,000
Referee: Veaceslav Banari (Moldova)

Brann won 6–4 on aggregate.

16 August 2007
18:00

Haka (Finland)	1–2	(Denmark) Midtjylland
Parviainen 53'	Report	Kristensen 13', 44'

Tehtaan kenttä, Valkeakoski
Attendance: 1,649
Referee: Charlie Richmond (Scotland)
30 August 2007
19:00

Midtjylland (Denmark)	5–2	(Finland) Haka
Flinta 16'; Olsen 27'; Dadu 34'; Troest 67'; Røll 85'	Report	Popovitch 33'; Kauppila 72'

MCH Arena, Herning
Attendance: 4,707
Referee: Aleksandar Stavrev (Macedonia)

Midtjylland won 7–3 on aggregate.

16 August 2007
18:00

Dinamo Minsk (Belarus)	1–1	(Denmark) Odense
Putsila 73'	Report	Laursen 90+4'

Dinamo Stadium, Minsk
Attendance: 3,867
Referee: Mark Courtney (Northern Ireland)
30 August 2007
20:30

Odense (Denmark)	4–0	(Belarus) Dinamo Minsk
Nielsen 38', 55'; Absalonsen 77', 79'	Report

Fionia Park, Odense
Attendance: 6,416
Referee: Michael Weiner (Germany)

Odense won 5–1 on aggregate.

16 August 2007
20:00

Käerjéng 97 (Luxembourg)	0–3	(Belgium) Standard Liège
	Report	Mbokani 59'; Witsel 81', 86'

Stade Josy Barthel, Luxembourg City
Attendance: 7,112
Referee: Johannes Valgeirsson (Iceland)
30 August 2007
20:00

Standard Liège (Belgium)	1–0	(Luxembourg) Käerjéng 97
De Camargo 89'	Report

Stade Maurice Dufrasne, Liège
Attendance: 8,700
Referee: Goran Mihaljević (Montenegro)

Standard Liège won 4–0 on aggregate.

16 August 2007
20:00

Hammarby IF (Sweden)	2–1	(Norway) Fredrikstad
Paulinho Guará 35'; Castro-Tello 49'	Report	Kvisvik 74'

Råsunda Stadium, Solna
Attendance: 5,500
Referee: Alan Kelly (Republic of Ireland)
30 August 2007
20:00

Fredrikstad (Norway)	1–1	(Sweden) Hammarby IF
John Anders Bjørkøy 85'	Report	Eguren 90' (pen.)

Fredrikstad stadion, Fredrikstad
Attendance: 7,548
Referee: Stanislav Sukhina (Russia)

Hammarby IF won 3–2 on aggregate.
