= 2006–07 UEFA Champions League qualifying rounds =

European football tournament

The qualifying rounds for the 2006–07 UEFA Champions League began on 11 July 2006. In total, there were three qualifying rounds which provided 16 clubs to join the group stage.

== Teams ==
Key to colours
Qualify for the group stage
Eliminated in the Third qualifying round; Advanced to the UEFA Cup first round

Third qualifying round
| Team | Coeff. |
|---|---|
| (Italy) Milan | 129.020 |
| (England) Liverpool | 105.950 |
| (England) Arsenal | 101.950 |
| (Spain) Valencia | 95.006 |
| (Netherlands) Ajax | 60.640 |
| (France) Lille | 54.757 |
| (Portugal) Benfica | 51.533 |
| (Russia) CSKA Moscow | 42.504 |
| (Greece) AEK Athens | 39.587 |
| (Ukraine) Shakhtar Donetsk | 33.777 |
| (Turkey) Galatasaray | 33.634 |
| (Germany) Hamburger SV | 30.960 |
| (Czech Republic) Slovan Liberec | 28.769 |
| Austria Wien | 27.723 |
| (Spain) Osasuna | 25.006 |
| (Italy) Chievo | 23.020 |
| (Israel) Maccabi Haifa | 19.108 |
| (Belgium) Standard Liège | 17.981 |

Second qualifying round
| Team | Coeff. |
|---|---|
| (Romania) Steaua București | 46.381 |
| (Ukraine) Dynamo Kyiv | 36.777 |
| (Bulgaria) Levski Sofia | 35.016 |
| (Turkey) Fenerbahçe | 28.634 |
| (Russia) Spartak Moscow | 21.504 |
| (Croatia) Dinamo Zagreb | 20.647 |
| (Serbia) Red Star Belgrade | 20.600 |
| (Scotland) Heart of Midlothian | 20.023 |
| (Denmark) Copenhagen | 16.593 |
| (Poland) Legia Warsaw | 16.104 |
| (Hungary) Debrecen | 13.840 |
| (Norway) Vålerenga | 11.921 |
| (Switzerland) Zürich | 10.537 |
| (Sweden) Djurgårdens IF | 9.372 |
| (Czech Republic) Mladá Boleslav | 8.769 |
| (Austria) Red Bull Salzburg | 8.723 |
| (Slovakia) Ružomberok | 6.070 |

First qualifying round
| Team | Coeff. |
|---|---|
| (Slovenia) HIT Gorica | 4.355 |
| (Finland) MYPA | 3.433 |
| (Cyprus) Apollon Limassol | 3.355 |
| (Bosnia and Herzegovina) Široki Brijeg | 2.695 |
| (Iceland) FH | 2.595 |
| (Latvia) Liepājas Metalurgs | 2.365 |
| (Moldova) Sheriff Tiraspol | 2.255 |
| (Georgia (country)) Sioni Bolnisi | 2.090 |
| (Lithuania) Ekranas | 1.925 |
| (Malta) Birkirkara | 1.880 |
| (North Macedonia) Rabotnicki | 1.760 |
| (Belarus) Shakhtyor Soligorsk | 1.457 |
| (Republic of Ireland) Cork City | 1.430 |
| (Albania) Elbasani | 1.210 |
| (Armenia) Pyunik | 0.990 |
| (Estonia) TVMK | 0.880 |
| (Northern Ireland) Linfield | 0.770 |
| (Wales) The New Saints | 0.770 |
| (Azerbaijan) Baku | 0.660 |
| (Luxembourg) F91 Dudelange | 0.605 |
| (Faroe Islands) B36 | 0.550 |
| (Kazakhstan) Aktobe | 0.550 |

== First qualifying round ==
The draw for this round was performed on 23 June 2006 in Nyon, Switzerland.

=== Seeding ===
| Seeded | | Unseeded | |
|---|---|---|---|
| (Slovenia) HIT Gorica (Finland) MYPA (Cyprus) Apollon Limassol (Bosnia and Herzegovina) Široki Brijeg (Iceland) FH (Latvia) Liepājas Metalurgs | (Moldova) Sheriff Tiraspol (Georgia (country)) Sioni Bolnisi (Lithuania) Ekranas (Malta) Birkirkara (North Macedonia) Rabotnicki | (Belarus) Shakhtyor Soligorsk (Republic of Ireland) Cork City (Albania) Elbasani (Armenia) Pyunik (Estonia) TVMK (Northern Ireland) Linfield | (Wales) The New Saints (Azerbaijan) Baku (Luxembourg) F91 Dudelange (Faroe Islands) B36 (Kazakhstan) Aktobe |

=== Summary ===
The first legs were played on 11 and 12 July 2006, with the second legs on 18 and 19 July.

| Team 1 | Agg. | Team 2 | 1st leg | 2nd leg |
|---|---|---|---|---|
| Elbasani (Albania) | 1–3 | (Lithuania) Ekranas | 1–0 | 0–3 |
| TVMK (Estonia) | 3–4 | (Iceland) FH | 2–3 | 1–1 |
| Liepājas Metalurgs (Latvia) | 2–1 | (Kazakhstan) Aktobe | 1–0 | 1–1 |
| MYPA (Finland) | 2–0 | (Wales) The New Saints | 1–0 | 1–0 |
| Cork City (Republic of Ireland) | 2–1 | (Cyprus) Apollon Limassol | 1–0 | 1–1 |
| Sioni Bolnisi (Georgia (country)) | 2–1 | (Azerbaijan) Baku | 2–0 | 0–1 |
| F91 Dudelange (Luxembourg) | 0–1 | (North Macedonia) Rabotnicki | 0–1 | 0–0 |
| Shakhtyor Soligorsk (Belarus) | 0–2 | (Bosnia and Herzegovina) Široki Brijeg | 0–1 | 0–1 |
| Birkirkara (Malta) | 2–5 | (Faroe Islands) B36 | 0–3 | 2–2 |
| Linfield (Northern Ireland) | 3–5 | (Slovenia) HIT Gorica | 1–3 | 2–2 |
| Pyunik (Armenia) | 0–2 | (Moldova) Sheriff Tiraspol | 0–0 | 0–2 |

=== Matches ===
11 July 2006
17:30

| Elbasani (Albania) | 1–0 | (Lithuania) Ekranas |
|---|---|---|
| Trojku 75' | Report |

Stadioni Ruzhdi Bizhuta, Elbasan
Attendance: 7,000
Referee: Bernardino González Vázquez (Spain)
18 July 2006
18:00

| Ekranas (Lithuania) | 3–0 | (Albania) Elbasani |
|---|---|---|
| Lukšys 13', 70'; Tomkevičius 48' | Report |

Aukštaitija Stadium, Panevėžys
Attendance: 2,570
Referee: David Malcolm (Northern Ireland)

Ekranas won 3–1 on aggregate.

11 July 2006
19:00

| TVMK (Estonia) | 2–3 | (Iceland) FH |
|---|---|---|
| K. Haavistu 70'; Dobrecovs 76' (pen.) | Report | Guðmundsson 33'; Ólafsson 69'; Atli Guðnason 90+2' |

Kadriorg Stadium, Tallinn
Attendance: 400
Referee: Per Ivar Staberg (Norway)
19 July 2006
19:15

| FH (Iceland) | 1–1 | (Estonia) TVMK |
|---|---|---|
| Atli Guðnason 90+1' | Report | Dobrecovs 60' (pen.) |

Kaplakriki, Hafnarfjörður
Attendance: 1,004
Referee: Mikko Vuorela (Finland)

FH won 4–3 on aggregate.

12 July 2006
21:00

| Liepājas Metalurgs (Latvia) | 1–0 | (Kazakhstan) Aktobe |
|---|---|---|
| Tamošauskas 14' | Report |

Daugava Stadium, Liepāja
Attendance: 3,500
Referee: Alojzije Supraha (Croatia)
19 July 2006
17:00

| Aktobe (Kazakhstan) | 1–1 | (Latvia) Liepājas Metalurgs |
|---|---|---|
| Nikolaev 17' | Report | Ivanovs 59' (pen.) |

Central Stadium, Aktobe
Attendance: 13,000
Referee: Ruud Bossen (Netherlands)

Liepājas Metalurgs won 2–1 on aggregate.

12 July 2006
20:00

| MYPA (Finland) | 1–0 | (Wales) The New Saints |
|---|---|---|
| Adriano 58' | Report |

Saviniemi, Anjalankoski
Attendance: 1,850
Referee: Dejan Stanišic (Serbia)
19 July 2006
19:30

| The New Saints (Wales) | 0–1 | (Finland) MYPA |
|---|---|---|
| | Report | Puhakainen 5' |

Latham Park, Newtown (Note: The New Saints played their home match at Latham Park in Newtown as their regular home venue Park Hall in Oswestry did not meet UEFA criteria.)
Attendance: 864
Referee: Peter Vervecken (Belgium)

MYPA won 2–0 on aggregate.

12 July 2006
18:30

| Cork City (Republic of Ireland) | 1–0 | (Cyprus) Apollon Limassol |
|---|---|---|
| Woods 62' | Report |

Turners Cross, Cork
Attendance: 3,882
Referee: Thomas Einwaller (Austria)
19 July 2006
21:00

| Apollon Limassol (Cyprus) | 1–1 | (Republic of Ireland) Cork City |
|---|---|---|
| Sosin 51' | Report | Murray 75' |

GSP Stadium, Nicosia (Note: Apollon Limassol played their home match at GSP Stadium in Nicosia, instead of their regular stadium, Tsirio Stadium in Limassol.)
Attendance: 5,563
Referee: Stefan Johannesson (Sweden)

Cork City won 2–1 on aggregate.

11 July 2006
22:00

| Sioni Bolnisi (Georgia (country)) | 2–0 | (Azerbaijan) Baku |
|---|---|---|
| Boyomo 69'; Ugrekhelidze 88' | Report |

Mikheil Meskhi Stadium, Tbilisi (Note: Sioni Bolnisi played their home matches at Mikheil Meskhi Stadium in Tbilisi as their regular home venue Tamaz Stepania Stadium in Bolnisi did not meet UEFA criteria.)
Attendance: 4,000
Referee: Thorsten Kinhöfer (Germany)
18 July 2006
19:00

| Baku (Azerbaijan) | 1–0 | (Georgia (country)) Sioni Bolnisi |
|---|---|---|
| F. Guliyev 63' | Report |

Tofiq Bahramov Republican Stadium, Baku
Attendance: 5,500
Referee: Sergiy Berezka (Ukraine)

Sioni Bolnisi won 2–1 on aggregate.

11 July 2006
19:00

| F91 Dudelange (Luxembourg) | 0–1 | (North Macedonia) Rabotnicki |
|---|---|---|
| | Report | Velkoski 77' |

Stade Jos Nosbaum, Dudelange
Attendance: 1,100
Referee: Meir Levi (Israel)
18 July 2006
20:00

| Rabotnicki (North Macedonia) | 0–0 | (Luxembourg) F91 Dudelange |
|---|---|---|
| | Report |

Philip II Arena, Skopje
Attendance: 2,000
Referee: Stanislav Sukhina (Russia)

Rabotnicki won 1–0 on aggregate.

12 July 2006
21:00

| Shakhtyor Soligorsk (Belarus) | 0–1 | (Bosnia and Herzegovina) Široki Brijeg |
|---|---|---|
| | Report | Bubalo 28' |

Central Stadium, Gomel (Note: Shakhtyor Soligorsk played their home match at Central Stadium, Gomel as their regular home venue Stroitel Stadium in Soligorsk did not meet UEFA criteria.)
Attendance: 6,000
Referee: Ian Stokes (Republic of Ireland)
19 July 2006
20:30

| Široki Brijeg (Bosnia and Herzegovina) | 1–0 | (Belarus) Shakhtyor Soligorsk |
|---|---|---|
| Ronielle 29' (pen.) | Report |

Stadion Pecara, Široki Brijeg
Attendance: 4,500
Referee: Tiziano Pieri (Italy)

Široki Brijeg won 2–0 on aggregate.

11 July 2006
18:30

| Birkirkara (Malta) | 0–3 | (Faroe Islands) B36 |
|---|---|---|
| | Report | Sylla 15', 32'; Thorleifson 90+2' |

Ta' Qali National Stadium, Ta' Qali
Attendance: 805
Referee: Sergey Shmolik (Belarus)
19 July 2006
19:00

| B36 (Faroe Islands) | 2–2 | (Malta) Birkirkara |
|---|---|---|
| Matras 44'; Okeke 80' | Report | Mallia 59'; Scicluna 83' |

Tórsvøllur, Tórshavn (Note: B36 played their home matches at Tórsvøllur stadium, instead of their regular home venue Gundadalur stadium.)
Attendance: 1,810
Referee: Radek Matějek (Czech Republic)

B36 won 5–2 on aggregate.

11 July 2006
17:00

| Linfield (Northern Ireland) | 1–3 | (Slovenia) HIT Gorica |
|---|---|---|
| Dickson 58' (pen.) | Report | Demirović 14', 27'; Šturm 66' |

Windsor Park, Belfast
Attendance: 1,906
Referee: Bruno Coue (France)
19 July 2006
20:05

| HIT Gorica (Slovenia) | 2–2 | (Northern Ireland) Linfield |
|---|---|---|
| Burgić 30', 83' | Report | Thompson 28'; McAreavey 90' |

Nova Gorica Sports Park, Nova Gorica
Attendance: 1,391
Referee: Cem Papila (Turkey)

HIT Gorica won 5–3 on aggregate.

11 July 2006
22:00

| Pyunik (Armenia) | 0–0 | (Moldova) Sheriff Tiraspol |
|---|---|---|
| | Report |

Vazgen Sargsyan Republican Stadium, Yerevan
Attendance: 5,000
Referee: René Rogalla (Switzerland)
18 July 2006
20:00

| Sheriff Tiraspol (Moldova) | 2–0 | (Armenia) Pyunik |
|---|---|---|
| Cociș 30'; Humenyuk 90' | Report |

Sheriff Stadium, Tiraspol
Attendance: 6,500
Referee: Mark Halsey (England)

Sheriff Tiraspol won 2–0 on aggregate.

== Second qualifying round ==
The draw for this round was performed on 23 June 2006 in Nyon, Switzerland.

=== Seeding ===
| Seeded | | Unseeded | |
|---|---|---|---|
| (Romania) Steaua București (Ukraine) Dynamo Kyiv (Bulgaria) Levski Sofia (Turkey) Fenerbahçe (Russia) Spartak Moscow (Croatia) Dinamo Zagreb (Serbia) Red Star Belgrade | (Scotland) Heart of Midlothian (Denmark) Copenhagen (Poland) Legia Warsaw (Hungary) Debrecen (Norway) Vålerenga (Switzerland) Zürich (Sweden) Djurgårdens IF | (Czech Republic) Mladá Boleslav (Austria) Red Bull Salzburg (Slovakia) Ružomberok (Slovenia) HIT Gorica (Finland) MYPA (Republic of Ireland) Cork City (Bosnia and Herzegovina) Široki Brijeg | (Iceland) FH (Latvia) Liepājas Metalurgs (Moldova) Sheriff Tiraspol (Georgia (country)) Sioni Bolnisi (Lithuania) Ekranas (Faroe Islands) B36 (North Macedonia) Rabotnicki |

Notes

1. ^{†} Winners of the previous qualifying round whose identity was not known at the time of the draw. Teams in italics defeated a team with a higher coefficient in the previous qualifying round, thus effectively taking the coefficient of their defeated opponent in the draw for this round.

=== Summary ===
The first legs were played on 25 and 26 July 2006, with the second legs on 1 and 2 August.

| Team 1 | Agg. | Team 2 | 1st leg | 2nd leg |
|---|---|---|---|---|
| HIT Gorica (Slovenia) | 0–5 | (Romania) Steaua București | 0–2 | 0–3 |
| Levski Sofia (Bulgaria) | 4–0 | (Georgia (country)) Sioni Bolnisi | 2–0 | 2–0 |
| Zürich (Switzerland) | 2–3 | (Austria) Red Bull Salzburg | 2–1 | 0–2 |
| Djurgårdens IF (Sweden) | 2–3 | (Slovakia) Ružomberok | 1–0 | 1–3 |
| Debrecen (Hungary) | 2–5 | (North Macedonia) Rabotnicki | 1–1 | 1–4 |
| Cork City (Republic of Ireland) | 0–4 | (Serbia) Red Star Belgrade | 0–1 | 0–3 |
| Fenerbahçe (Turkey) | 9–0 | (Faroe Islands) B36 | 4–0 | 5–0 |
| Mladá Boleslav (Czech Republic) | 5–3 | (Norway) Vålerenga | 3–1 | 2–2 |
| Sheriff Tiraspol (Moldova) | 1–1 (a) | (Russia) Spartak Moscow | 1–1 | 0–0 |
| Liepājas Metalurgs (Latvia) | 1–8 | (Ukraine) Dynamo Kyiv | 1–4 | 0–4 |
| FH (Iceland) | 0–3 | (Poland) Legia Warsaw | 0–1 | 0–2 |
| Copenhagen (Denmark) | 4–2 | (Finland) MYPA | 2–0 | 2–2 |
| Ekranas (Lithuania) | 3–9 | (Croatia) Dinamo Zagreb | 1–4 | 2–5 |
| Heart of Midlothian (Scotland) | 3–0 | (Bosnia and Herzegovina) Široki Brijeg | 3–0 | 0–0 |

=== Matches ===
26 July 2006
21:00

| HIT Gorica (Slovenia) | 0–2 | (Romania) Steaua București |
|---|---|---|
| | Report | Dică 54'; Iacob 65' |

Nova Gorica Sports Park, Nova Gorica
Attendance: 1,548
Referee: Stefan Messner (Austria)
2 August 2006
20:00

| Steaua București (Romania) | 3–0 | (Slovenia) HIT Gorica |
|---|---|---|
| Boștină 43'; Iacob 70'; Ochiroșii 87' (pen.) | Report |

Stadionul Național, Bucharest
Attendance: 16,763
Referee: Pavel Královec (Czech Republic)

Steaua București won 5–0 on aggregate.

26 July 2006
19:30

| Levski Sofia (Bulgaria) | 2–0 | (Georgia (country)) Sioni Bolnisi |
|---|---|---|
| E. Angelov 20'; Borimirov 82' (pen.) | Report |

Georgi Asparuhov Stadium, Sofia
Attendance: 11,075
Referee: Fritz Stuchlik (Austria)
2 August 2006
16:00

| Sioni Bolnisi (Georgia (country)) | 0–2 | (Bulgaria) Levski Sofia |
|---|---|---|
| | Report | Domovchiyski 28'; E. Angelov 90+1' |

Mikheil Meskhi Stadium, Tbilisi
Attendance: 6,900
Referee: Selçuk Dereli (Turkey)

Levski Sofia won 4–0 on aggregate.

26 July 2006
20:15

| Zürich (Switzerland) | 2–1 | (Austria) Red Bull Salzburg |
|---|---|---|
| Keita 2'; César 20' | Report | Vonlanthen 32' |

Hardturm, Zürich (Note: Zürich played their home match at Hardturm as their regular home venue Letzigrund was closed for renovation.)
Attendance: 11,200
Referee: Alan Kelly (Republic of Ireland)
2 August 2006
20:15

| Red Bull Salzburg (Austria) | 2–0 | (Switzerland) Zürich |
|---|---|---|
| Tiffert 39'; Zickler 56' (pen.) | Report |

Red Bull Arena, Salzburg
Attendance: 16,168
Referee: Pieter Vink (Netherlands)

Red Bull Salzburg won 3–2 on aggregate.

26 July 2006
20:00

| Djurgårdens IF (Sweden) | 1–0 | (Slovakia) Ružomberok |
|---|---|---|
| Enrico 70' | Report |

Råsunda Stadium, Solna (Note: Djurgårdens IF played their home match at Råsunda Stadium in Solna as their regular home venue Stockholm Olympic Stadium did not meet UEFA criteria.)
Attendance: 8,161
Referee: Alexandru Tudor (Romania)
2 August 2006
20:00

| Ružomberok (Slovakia) | 3–1 | (Sweden) Djurgårdens IF |
|---|---|---|
| Žofčák 14'; Tomčák 18'; Nezmar 88' | Report | Kusi-Asare 75' |

Štadión pod Čebraťom, Ružomberok
Attendance: 4,800
Referee: Hervé Piccirillo (France)

Ružomberok won 3–2 on aggregate.

26 July 2006
20:45

| Debrecen (Hungary) | 1–1 | (North Macedonia) Rabotnicki |
|---|---|---|
| Zsolnai 55' (pen.) | Report | Stankovski 45' |

Stadion Oláh Gábor Út, Debrecen
Attendance: 6,124
Referee: Oleh Oriekhov (Ukraine)
2 August 2006
20:00

| Rabotnicki (North Macedonia) | 4–1 | (Hungary) Debrecen |
|---|---|---|
| Nexhipi 21'; Pejčić 35'; Trajčev 42'; Neno 56' | Report | Sidibe 20' |

Philip II Arena, Skopje
Attendance: 5,500
Referee: Damir Skomina (Slovenia)

Rabotnicki won 5–2 on aggregate.

26 July 2006
20:45

| Cork City (Republic of Ireland) | 0–1 | (Serbia) Red Star Belgrade |
|---|---|---|
| | Report | Behan 37' (o.g.) |

Turners Cross, Cork
Attendance: 5,442
Referee: Tomasz Mikulski (Poland)
2 August 2006
20:15

| Red Star Belgrade (Serbia) | 3–0 | (Republic of Ireland) Cork City |
|---|---|---|
| Milovanović 3'; Žigić 34', 59' | Report |

Red Star Stadium, Belgrade
Attendance: 25,858
Referee: Knut Kircher (Germany)

Red Star Belgrade won 4–0 on aggregate.

26 July 2006
20:00

| Fenerbahçe (Turkey) | 4–0 | (Faroe Islands) B36 |
|---|---|---|
| Appiah 26'; Tümer 39'; Tuncay 54'; Önder 90+3' | Report |

Şükrü Saracoğlu Stadium, Istanbul
Attendance: 34,500
Referee: Edo Trivković (Croatia)
1 August 2006
19:30

| B36 (Faroe Islands) | 0–5 | (Turkey) Fenerbahçe |
|---|---|---|
| | Report | Tuncay 44'; Mehmet Yozgatlı 49'; Can 79'; Semih 83'; Murat Hacıoğlu 90' |

Tórsvøllur, Tórshavn
Attendance: 1,548
Referee: Ceri Richards (Wales)

Fenerbahçe won 9–0 on aggregate.

26 July 2006
20:45

| Mladá Boleslav (Czech Republic) | 3–1 | (Norway) Vålerenga |
|---|---|---|
| Pecka 7'; Matějovský 11', 19' | Report | Gashi 67' |

Městský stadion, Mladá Boleslav
Attendance: 5,000
Referee: Pedro Proença (Portugal)
2 August 2006
20:45

| Vålerenga (Norway) | 2–2 | (Czech Republic) Mladá Boleslav |
|---|---|---|
| Vít 73' (o.g.); Fredheim-Holm 86' | Report | Brezinský 41'; Kulič 83' |

Ullevaal Stadion, Oslo
Attendance: 9,639
Referee: Craig Thomson (Scotland)

Mladá Boleslav won 5–3 on aggregate.

26 July 2006
19:00

| Sheriff Tiraspol (Moldova) | 1–1 | (Russia) Spartak Moscow |
|---|---|---|
| Omotoyossi 90+2' | Report | Kováč 77' |

Sheriff Stadium, Tiraspol
Attendance: 12,000
Referee: Robert Małek (Poland)
2 August 2006
17:00

| Spartak Moscow (Russia) | 0–0 | (Moldova) Sheriff Tiraspol |
|---|---|---|
| | Report |

Luzhniki Stadium, Moscow
Attendance: 22,000
Referee: Serge Gumienny (Belgium)

1–1 on aggregate; Spartak Moscow won on away goals.

26 July 2006
19:00

| Liepājas Metalurgs (Latvia) | 1–4 | (Ukraine) Dynamo Kyiv |
|---|---|---|
| Kalonas 87' | Report | Rincón 20'; Shatskikh 29'; Verpakovskis 32'; Gavrančić 82' |

Daugava Stadium, Liepāja
Attendance: 4,573
Referee: Mark Courtney (Northern Ireland)
2 August 2006
18:00

| Dynamo Kyiv (Ukraine) | 4–0 | (Latvia) Liepājas Metalurgs |
|---|---|---|
| Rotan 37', 90'; Corrêa 66'; Rebrov 85' | Report |

Valeriy Lobanovskyi Dynamo Stadium, Kyiv
Attendance: 9,470
Referee: Michael Weiner (Germany)

Dynamo Kyiv won 8–1 on aggregate.

26 July 2006
19:30

| FH (Iceland) | 0–1 | (Poland) Legia Warsaw |
|---|---|---|
| | Report | Élton 83' |

Kaplakriki, Hafnarfjörður
Attendance: 1,910
Referee: Martin Ingvarsson (Sweden)
2 August 2006
20:30

| Legia Warsaw (Poland) | 2–0 | (Iceland) FH |
|---|---|---|
| Vuković 38'; Edson 86' | Report |

Polish Army Stadium, Warsaw
Attendance: 6,400
Referee: Athanassios Briakos (Greece)

Legia Warsaw won 3–0 on aggregate.

26 July 2006
20:45

| Copenhagen (Denmark) | 2–0 | (Finland) MYPA |
|---|---|---|
| Bergdølmo 64' (pen.); Gravgaard 90+3' | Report |

Parken Stadium, Copenhagen
Attendance: 17,523
Referee: Carlos Megía Dávila (Spain)
2 August 2006
19:00

| MYPA (Finland) | 2–2 | (Denmark) Copenhagen |
|---|---|---|
| Peltonen 41'; Puhakainen 79' | Report | Berglund 12'; Linderoth 73' |

Saviniemi, Anjalankoski
Attendance: 2,443
Referee: Igor Egorov (Russia)

Copenhagen won 4–2 on aggregate.

25 July 2006
17:00

| Ekranas (Lithuania) | 1–4 | (Croatia) Dinamo Zagreb |
|---|---|---|
| Lukšys 14' | Report | Eduardo 7', 51'; Buljat 32'; Vugrinec 69' |

Aukštaitija Stadium, Panevėžys
Attendance: 2,700
Referee: Tony Asumaa (Finland)
2 August 2006
20:30

| Dinamo Zagreb (Croatia) | 5–2 | (Lithuania) Ekranas |
|---|---|---|
| Ljubojević 2', 62', 90+1'; Vukojević 48'; Vugrinec 90' | Report | Savėnas 65'; Lukšys 69' |

Stadion Maksimir, Zagreb
Attendance: 6,270
Referee: Rob Styles (England)

Dinamo Zagreb won 9–3 on aggregate.

26 July 2006
20:45

| Heart of Midlothian (Scotland) | 3–0 | (Bosnia and Herzegovina) Široki Brijeg |
|---|---|---|
| Anić 53' (o.g.); Tall 79'; Bednář 85' | Report |

Murrayfield Stadium, Edinburgh (Note: Heart of Midlothian played their home matches at Murrayfield Stadium as their regular home venue Tynecastle Park did not meet UEFA criteria.)
Attendance: 28,486
Referee: Espen Berntsen (Norway)
2 August 2006
20:30

| Široki Brijeg (Bosnia and Herzegovina) | 0–0 | (Scotland) Heart of Midlothian |
|---|---|---|
| | Report |

Stadion Pecara, Široki Brijeg
Attendance: 5,000
Referee: Viktor Kassai (Hungary)

Heart of Midlothian won 3–0 on aggregate.

== Third qualifying round ==
The draw for this round was performed on 28 July 2006 in Nyon, Switzerland.

=== Seeding ===
| Seeded | | Unseeded | |
|---|---|---|---|
| (Italy) Milan (England) Liverpool (England) Arsenal (Spain) Valencia (Netherlands) Ajax (France) Lille (Portugal) Benfica (Romania) Steaua București | (Russia) CSKA Moscow (Greece) AEK Athens (Ukraine) Dynamo Kyiv (Bulgaria) Levski Sofia (Ukraine) Shakhtar Donetsk (Turkey) Galatasaray (Germany) Hamburger SV (Czech Republic) Slovan Liberec | (Turkey) Fenerbahçe; Austria Wien (Spain) Osasuna (Italy) Chievo (Russia) Spartak Moscow (Croatia) Dinamo Zagreb (Serbia) Red Star Belgrade (Scotland) Heart of Midlothian | (Israel) Maccabi Haifa (Belgium) Standard Liège (Denmark) Copenhagen (Poland) Legia Warsaw (North Macedonia) Rabotnicki (Czech Republic) Mladá Boleslav (Austria) Red Bull Salzburg (Slovakia) Ružomberok |

Notes

1. ^{†} Winners of the previous qualifying round whose identity was not known at the time of the draw. Teams in italics defeated a team with a higher coefficient in the previous qualifying round, thus effectively taking the coefficient of their defeated opponent in the draw for this round.

=== Summary ===
The first legs were played on 8 and 9 August 2006, with the second legs on 22 and 23 August. The teams eliminated in this round qualified for the first round of the UEFA Cup.

| Team 1 | Agg. | Team 2 | 1st leg | 2nd leg |
|---|---|---|---|---|
| Slovan Liberec (Czech Republic) | 1–2 | (Russia) Spartak Moscow | 0–0 | 1–2 |
| Shakhtar Donetsk (Ukraine) | 4–2 | (Poland) Legia Warsaw | 1–0 | 3–2 |
| Red Bull Salzburg (Austria) | 1–3 | (Spain) Valencia | 1–0 | 0–3 |
| Levski Sofia (Bulgaria) | 4–2 | (Italy) Chievo | 2–0 | 2–2 |
| Heart of Midlothian (Scotland) | 1–5 | (Greece) AEK Athens | 1–2 | 0–3 |
| CSKA Moscow (Russia) | 5–0 | (Slovakia) Ružomberok | 3–0 | 2–0 |
| Milan (Italy) | 3–1 | (Serbia) Red Star Belgrade | 1–0 | 2–1 |
| Galatasaray (Turkey) | 6–3 | (Czech Republic) Mladá Boleslav | 5–2 | 1–1 |
| Standard Liège (Belgium) | 3–4 | (Romania) Steaua București | 2–2 | 1–2 |
| Austria Wien | 1–4 | (Portugal) Benfica | 1–1 | 0–3 |
| Dinamo Zagreb (Croatia) | 1–5 | (England) Arsenal | 0–3 | 1–2 |
| Copenhagen (Denmark) | 3–2 | (Netherlands) Ajax | 1–2 | 2–0 |
| Hamburger SV (Germany) | 1–1 (a) | (Spain) Osasuna | 0–0 | 1–1 |
| Dynamo Kyiv (Ukraine) | 5–3 | (Turkey) Fenerbahçe | 3–1 | 2–2 |
| Liverpool (England) | 3–2 | (Israel) Maccabi Haifa | 2–1 | 1–1 |
| Lille (France) | 4–0 | (North Macedonia) Rabotnicki | 3–0 | 1–0 |

=== Matches ===
9 August 2006
20:15

| Slovan Liberec (Czech Republic) | 0–0 | (Russia) Spartak Moscow |
|---|---|---|
| | Report |

Stadion u Nisy, Liberec
Attendance: 8,130
Referee: Craig Thomson (Scotland)
23 August 2006
17:00

| Spartak Moscow (Russia) | 2–1 | (Czech Republic) Slovan Liberec |
|---|---|---|
| Mozart 23'; Pavlyuchenko 79' | Report | Hodúr 73' (pen.) |

Luzhniki Stadium, Moscow
Attendance: 35,000
Referee: Luis Medina Cantalejo (Spain)

Spartak Moscow won 2–1 on aggregate.

9 August 2006
18:30

| Shakhtar Donetsk (Ukraine) | 1–0 | (Poland) Legia Warsaw |
|---|---|---|
| Elano 19' (pen.) | Report |

RSC Olimpiyskiy, Donetsk
Attendance: 24,000
Referee: Frank De Bleeckere (Belgium)
23 August 2006
20:30

| Legia Warsaw (Poland) | 2–3 | (Ukraine) Shakhtar Donetsk |
|---|---|---|
| Włodarczyk 19', 88' | Report | Marica 25', 45+5'; Fernandinho 29' |

Polish Army Stadium, Warsaw
Attendance: 8,700
Referee: Mike Riley (England)

Shakhtar Donetsk won 4–2 on aggregate.

9 August 2006
20:45

| Red Bull Salzburg (Austria) | 1–0 | (Spain) Valencia |
|---|---|---|
| Piták 73' | Report |

Red Bull Arena, Salzburg
Attendance: 18,000
Referee: Peter Fröjdfeldt (Sweden)
22 August 2006
22:00

| Valencia (Spain) | 3–0 | (Austria) Red Bull Salzburg |
|---|---|---|
| Morientes 13'; Villa 33'; Silva 90+4' | Report |

Mestalla Stadium, Valencia
Attendance: 50,283
Referee: Ľuboš Micheľ (Slovakia)

Valencia won 3–1 on aggregate.

9 August 2006
19:30

| Levski Sofia (Bulgaria) | 2–0 | (Italy) Chievo |
|---|---|---|
| Domovchiyski 8'; Bardon 86' (pen.) | Report |

Vasil Levski National Stadium, Sofia
Attendance: 18,949
Referee: Jaroslav Jara (Czech Republic)
23 August 2006
21:00

| Chievo (Italy) | 2–2 | (Bulgaria) Levski Sofia |
|---|---|---|
| Amauri 48', 81' | Report | Telkiyski 34'; Bardon 46' |

Stadio Marc'Antonio Bentegodi, Verona
Attendance: 23,517
Referee: Lucílio Batista (Portugal)

Levski Sofia won 4–2 on aggregate.

9 August 2006
21:45

| Heart of Midlothian (Scotland) | 1–2 | (Greece) AEK Athens |
|---|---|---|
| Mikoliūnas 62' | Report | Kapetanos 89'; Fyssas 90+2' (o.g.) |

Murrayfield Stadium, Edinburgh
Attendance: 32,450
Referee: Nicolai Vollquartz (Denmark)
23 August 2006
20:45

| AEK Athens (Greece) | 3–0 | (Scotland) Heart of Midlothian |
|---|---|---|
| Júlio César 79' (pen.), 86'; Liberopoulos 82' | Report |

Olympic Stadium, Athens
Attendance: 42,925
Referee: Yuri Baskakov (Russia)

AEK Athens won 5–1 on aggregate.

9 August 2006
18:00

| CSKA Moscow (Russia) | 3–0 | (Slovakia) Ružomberok |
|---|---|---|
| Olić 58', 65'; Vágner Love 83' | Report |

Lokomotiv Stadium, Moscow (Note: CSKA Moscow played their home match at Lokomotiv Stadium instead of their regular home venue Dynamo Stadium.)
Attendance: 9,947
Referee: Florian Meyer (Germany)
23 August 2006
20:30

| Ružomberok (Slovakia) | 0–2 | (Russia) CSKA Moscow |
|---|---|---|
| | Report | Carvalho 4'; Vágner Love 28' |

Štadión pod Čebraťom, Ružomberok
Attendance: 4,715
Referee: Olegário Benquerença (Portugal)

CSKA Moscow won 5–0 on aggregate.

9 August 2006
20:45

| Milan (Italy) | 1–0 | (Serbia) Red Star Belgrade |
|---|---|---|
| Inzaghi 22' | Report |

San Siro, Milan
Attendance: 70,510
Referee: Jan Wegereef (Netherlands)
22 August 2006
21:00

| Red Star Belgrade (Serbia) | 1–2 | (Italy) Milan |
|---|---|---|
| Đokić 80' | Report | Inzaghi 29'; Seedorf 79' |

Red Star Stadium, Belgrade
Attendance: 49,604
Referee: Claus Bo Larsen (Denmark)

Milan won 3–1 on aggregate.

9 August 2006
19:30

| Galatasaray (Turkey) | 5–2 | (Czech Republic) Mladá Boleslav |
|---|---|---|
| Ilić 7' (pen.); Turan 43', 60'; Şükür 49'; Sabri 90' | Report | Brezinský 82'; Kulič 83' |

Ali Sami Yen Stadium, Istanbul
Attendance: 17,715
Referee: Konrad Plautz (Austria)
23 August 2006
19:30

| Mladá Boleslav (Czech Republic) | 1–1 | (Turkey) Galatasaray |
|---|---|---|
| Palát 88' | Report | Hasan Şaş 73' |

Městský stadion, Mladá Boleslav
Attendance: 4,680
Referee: Martin Hansson (Sweden)

Galatasaray won 6–3 on aggregate.

9 August 2006
20:30

| Standard Liège (Belgium) | 2–2 | (Romania) Steaua București |
|---|---|---|
| Rapaić 17', 51' | Report | Paraschiv 8'; Marin 79' |

Stade Maurice Dufrasne, Liège
Attendance: 15,613
Referee: Valentin Ivanov (Russia)
23 August 2006
19:30

| Steaua București (Romania) | 2–1 | (Belgium) Standard Liège |
|---|---|---|
| Badea 35', 51' | Report | Jovanović 2' |

Stadionul Național, Bucharest
Attendance: 44,234
Referee: Graham Poll (England)

Steaua București won 4–3 on aggregate.

8 August 2006
20:45

| Austria Wien | 1–1 | (Portugal) Benfica |
|---|---|---|
| Blanchard 36' | Report | Nuno Gomes 16' |

Ernst-Happel-Stadion, Vienna (Note: Austria Wien played their home match at Ernst-Happel-Stadion instead of their regular home venue Franz Horr Stadium.)
Attendance: 19,600
Referee: Stefano Farina (Italy)
22 August 2006
21:15

| Benfica (Portugal) | 3–0 | Austria Wien |
|---|---|---|
| Rui Costa 21'; Nuno Gomes 45+3'; Petit 57' | Report |

Estádio da Luz, Lisbon
Attendance: 58,110
Referee: Terje Hauge (Norway)

Benfica won 4–1 on aggregate.

8 August 2006
21:05

| Dinamo Zagreb (Croatia) | 0–3 | (England) Arsenal |
|---|---|---|
| | Report | Fàbregas 63', 78'; Van Persie 64' |

Stadion Maksimir, Zagreb
Attendance: 31,120
Referee: Kyros Vassaras (Greece)
23 August 2006
21:05

| Arsenal (England) | 2–1 | (Croatia) Dinamo Zagreb |
|---|---|---|
| Ljungberg 77'; Flamini 90+1' | Report | Eduardo 12' |

Emirates Stadium, London
Attendance: 52,498
Referee: Bertrand Layec (France)

Arsenal won 5–1 on aggregate.

9 August 2006
20:30

| Copenhagen (Denmark) | 1–2 | (Netherlands) Ajax |
|---|---|---|
| Hangeland 45+2' | Report | Huntelaar 37', 84' |

Parken Stadium, Copenhagen
Attendance: 40,000
Referee: Manuel Mejuto González (Spain)
23 August 2006
20:30

| Ajax (Netherlands) | 0–2 | (Denmark) Copenhagen |
|---|---|---|
| | Report | Silberbauer 59'; Vermaelen 77' (o.g.) |

Amsterdam Arena, Amsterdam
Attendance: 35,617
Referee: Herbert Fandel (Germany)

Copenhagen won 3–2 on aggregate.

9 August 2006
20:30

| Hamburger SV (Germany) | 0–0 | (Spain) Osasuna |
|---|---|---|
| | Report |

Volksparkstadion, Hamburg
Attendance: 47,458
Referee: Tom Henning Øvrebø (Norway)
22 August 2006
20:45

| Osasuna (Spain) | 1–1 | (Germany) Hamburger SV |
|---|---|---|
| Cuéllar 6' | Report | De Jong 74' |

El Sadar Stadium, Pamplona
Attendance: 18,768
Referee: Massimo Busacca (Switzerland)

1–1 on aggregate; Hamburger SV won on away goals.

9 August 2006
18:00

| Dynamo Kyiv (Ukraine) | 3–1 | (Turkey) Fenerbahçe |
|---|---|---|
| Rincón 1', 67'; Yussuf 83' | Report | Mehmet Aurélio 48' |

Valeriy Lobanovskyi Dynamo Stadium, Kyiv
Attendance: 16,873
Referee: Darko Čeferin (Slovenia)
23 August 2006
20:00

| Fenerbahçe (Turkey) | 2–2 | (Ukraine) Dynamo Kyiv |
|---|---|---|
| Appiah 36'; Kerim 57' | Report | Shatskikh 5', 42' |

Şükrü Saracoğlu Stadium, Istanbul
Attendance: 42,836
Referee: Steve Bennett (England)

Dynamo Kyiv won 5–3 on aggregate.

9 August 2006
21:05

| Liverpool (England) | 2–1 | (Israel) Maccabi Haifa |
|---|---|---|
| Bellamy 32'; González 87' | Report | Boccoli 29' |

Anfield, Liverpool
Attendance: 40,058
Referee: Wolfgang Stark (Germany)
22 August 2006
20:35

| Maccabi Haifa (Israel) | 1–1 | (England) Liverpool |
|---|---|---|
| Colautti 63' | Report | Crouch 54' |

Valeriy Lobanovskyi Dynamo Stadium, Kyiv, Ukraine (Note: Due to the armed conflict going on in Israel, UEFA decided that no European matches could be staged in the country until further notice. The match was played at Valeriy Lobanovskyi Dynamo Stadium in Kyiv, Ukraine, instead of Maccabi Haifa regular home venue Kiryat Eliezer Stadium in Haifa.)
Attendance: 15,000
Referee: Roberto Rosetti (Italy)

Liverpool won 3–2 on aggregate.

9 August 2006
18:00

| Lille (France) | 3–0 | (North Macedonia) Rabotnicki |
|---|---|---|
| Jovanovski 60' (o.g.); Bastos 70' (pen.); Fauvergue 72' | Report |

Stadium Lille Métropole, Villeneuve-d'Ascq
Attendance: 9,560
Referee: Vladimír Hriňák (Slovakia)
23 August 2006
20:00

| Rabotnicki (North Macedonia) | 0–1 | (France) Lille |
|---|---|---|
| | Report | Audel 18' |

Philip II Arena, Skopje
Attendance: 6,500
Referee: Costas Kapitanis (Cyprus)

Lille won 4–0 on aggregate.
