= Parviainen =

Parviainen is a Finnish surname. Notable people with the surname include:

- Aki Parviainen (born 1974), Finnish javelin thrower
- Emmi Parviainen (born 1985), Finnish actress
- Hannu-Pekka "HP" Parviainen (born 1981), Finnish snowboarder
- Heidi Parviainen (born 1979), Finnish singer
- Janne Parviainen (born 1973), Finnish drummer
- Jouko Parviainen (born 1958), Finnish skier
- Kaisa Parviainen (1914–2002), Finnish javelin thrower
- Kalle Parviainen (born 1982), Finnish footballer

== See also ==
- Mount Parviainen, a mountain in Antarctica
