= Miloš Gibala =

Slovak footballer

Personal information
- Full name: Miloš Gibala
- Date of birth: 21 May 1985 (age 41)
- Place of birth: Lučenec, Czechoslovakia
- Height: 1.79 m (5 ft 10 in)
- Position: Forward

Youth career
- –2000: 1.FC Buzitka-Opatová
- 2000–2001: FC Junior Radvan
- 2001–2004: Rapid Ružinov

Senior career*
Years	Team	Apps	(Gls)
2004–2005	Rapid Ružinov		
2004	→ Lučenec (loan)		
2005	→ Banská Bystrica (loan)		
2005–2009	Banská Bystrica	20	(1)
2006–2007	→ Rimavská Sobota (loan)		
2007–2008	→ Zlaté Moravce (loan)	17	(2)
2008	→ Humenné (loan)		
2008–2009	→ Rimavská Sobota (loan)		
2009	→ Rimavská Sobota (loan)		
2010	Karlovy Vary		
2010–2012	Ústí nad Labem	5	(0)
2011	→ Chomutov (loan)		
2017–2022	BSV Eintracht Sondershausen	54	(35)

International career^{‡}
- Slovakia U-15
- Slovakia U-16
- Slovakia U-17
- Slovakia U-18
- Slovakia U-19
- Slovakia U-20
- * Club domestic league appearances and goals as of 7 July 2012 ‡ National team caps and goals as of 7 July 2012

Miloš Gibala (born 21 May 1985) is a Slovak former football forward who last played for BSV Eintracht Sondershausen in the German lower leagues.

== Club career ==
Born and raised in Lučenec in central Slovakia, Gibala started his career in the academy of 1.FC Buzitka-Opatová in his hometown. He moved to the capital, Bratislava, in 2001 to join FK Rapid Ružinov. His performances led to him being nominated for the Slovak youth national team.

=== Banská Bystrica ===
After interest from teams such as AS Trenčín, Gibala would join FK Dukla Banská Bystrica. He scored 18 goals across the season for the reserve team of Banská Bystrica. In the first half of the 2006–2007 season, he was the top goal scorer in the Dukla squad, having scored 4 goals. In 2008, Gibala went out on loan to MŠK Rimavská Sobota.

=== Zlaté Moravce (loan) ===
In 2007, Gibala joined FC ViOn Zlaté Moravce on a loan. While playing with Zlaté Moravce in the UEFA Cup qualifying matches in the 2007/08 season, Gibala prevailed in the first round against the Kazakh representatives FK Alma-Ata, scoring the two decisive goals in a 3–1 victory. Zlaté Moravce would go on to draw the second leg 1–1 and advance to the next stage. In the second round, they faced the eventual UEFA Cup winners, Zenit St. Petersburg, which proved to be their elimination.

=== Ústí nad Labem ===
In 2010, Gibala joined FK Viagem Ústí nad Labem.
