= 2006–07 UEFA Champions League =

European football tournament

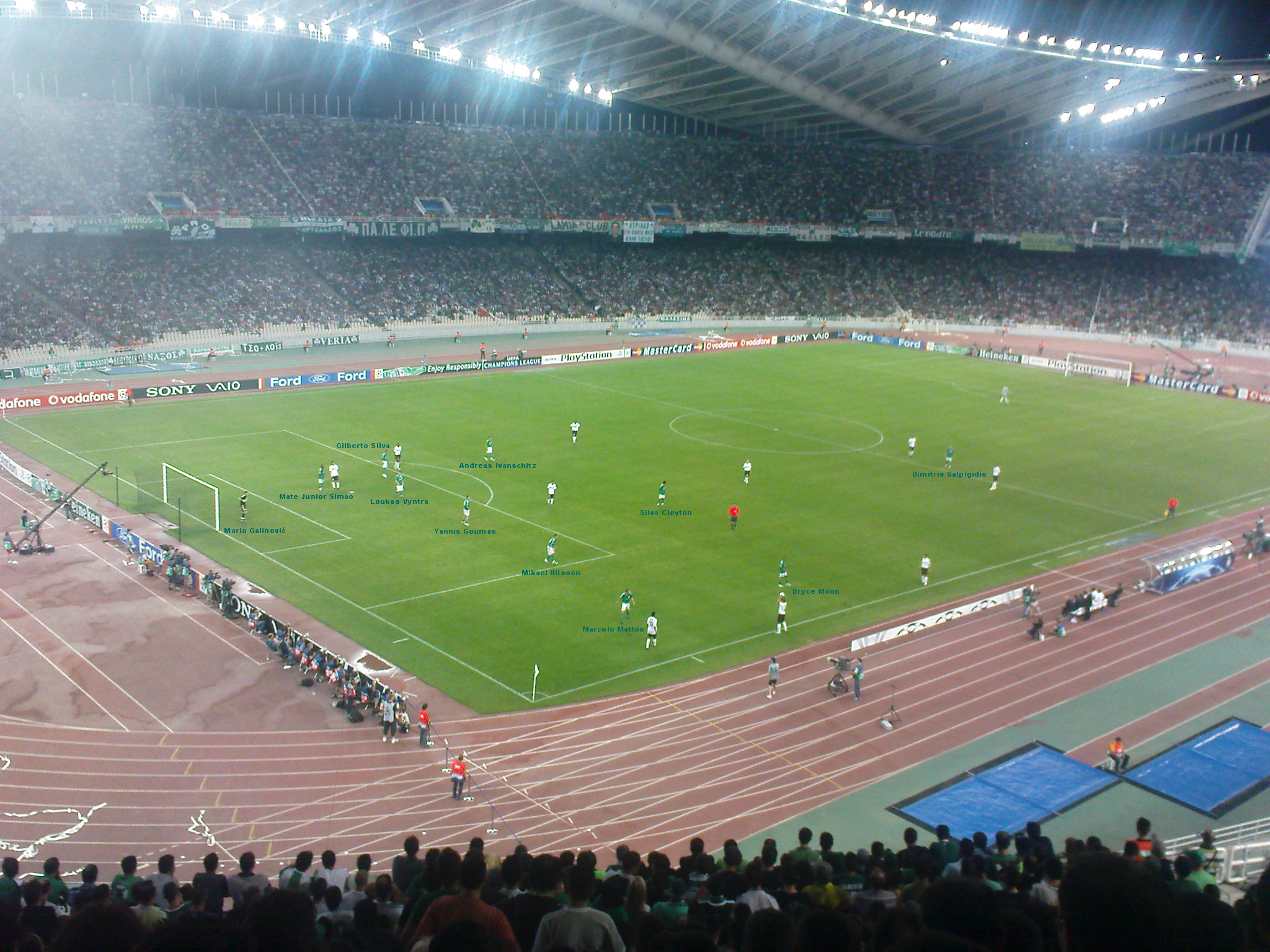
- The Olympic Stadium in Athens hosted the final

Tournament details
- Dates: Qualifying: 11 July – 23 August 2006; Competition proper: 12 September 2006 – 23 May 2007
- Teams: Competition proper: 32; Total: 73

Final positions
- Champions: (Italy) Milan (7th title)
- Runners-up: (England) Liverpool

Tournament statistics
- Matches played: 125
- Goals scored: 309 (2.47 per match)
- Attendance: 5,525,076 (44,201 per match)
- Top scorer(s): Kaká (Milan); 10 goals

The 2006–07 UEFA Champions League was the 15th season of UEFA's premier European club football tournament, the UEFA Champions League, since it was rebranded from the European Cup, and the 52nd season overall. The final was contested by Milan and Liverpool on 23 May 2007. Beforehand, the match was billed as a repeat of the 2005 final, the only difference being that the 2007 final was to be played at the Olympic Stadium in Athens, Greece. Milan won the match 2–1 to claim their seventh European Cup, with both goals coming from Filippo Inzaghi. Dirk Kuyt scored for Liverpool.

Barcelona were the defending champions, but were eliminated by Liverpool in the first knockout round.

The is season marked the introduction of the Adidas Finale as the mandatory official match ball from the group stage onward, per competition regulations. While the Adidas Finale 6 was used across the tournament, a special Adidas Finale Athens variant was debuted for the final in Athens.

== Association team allocation ==
A total of 73 teams from 49 UEFA member associations participated in the 2006–07 UEFA Champions League. Liechtenstein (who did not have their own domestic league) as well as the 2 lowest-ranked federations, Andorra and San Marino, did not participate. Montenegro, which did not become a UEFA member until January 2007 also did not take part. Each association enters a certain number of clubs to the Champions League based on its league coefficient, which takes into account the performance of its clubs in European competitions from 2000–01 to 2004–05; associations with a higher league coefficients may enter more clubs than associations with a lower league coefficient, but no association may enter more than four teams. Italy's representatives were decided based on the revised table following the match-fixing scandal which saw Juventus relegated to Serie B after winning the league the previous season.

- Associations 1–3 each have four teams qualify.
- Associations 4–6 each have three teams qualify.
- Associations 7–15 each have two teams qualify.
- Associations 16–50 (except Liechtenstein) each have one team qualify.

=== Association ranking ===
For the 2006–07 UEFA Champions League, the associations are allocated places according to their 2006 UEFA country coefficients, which takes into account their performance in European competitions from 2001–02 to 2005–06.

Rank	Association	Coeff.	Teams
1	Spain	73.717	4
2	England	63.224	4
3	Italy	61.186	4
4	France	49.469	3
5	Germany	48.989	3
6	Portugal	44.666	3
7	Netherlands	39.831	2
8	Greece	35.498	2
9	Belgium	31.750	2
10	Scotland	31.750	2
11	Turkey	29.916	2
12	Czech Republic	27.950	2
13	Russia	25.666	2
14	Austria	24.875	2
15	Ukraine	24.850	2
16	Israel	21.874	1
17	Serbia and Montenegro	21.249	1
18	Poland	21.000	1

Rank	Association	Coeff.	Teams
19	Switzerland	20.875	1
20	Norway	20.200	1
21	Bulgaria	18.540	1
22	Croatia	18.125	1
23	Denmark	17.200	1
24	Hungary	16.331	1
25	Romania	15.457	1
26	Sweden	15.383	1
27	Slovakia	11.665	1
28	Slovenia	9.665	1
29	Cyprus	8.165	1
30	Bosnia and Herzegovina	7.165	1
31	Latvia	6.664	1
32	Finland	6.540	1
33	Moldova	6.332	1
34	Georgia	6.165	1
35	Lithuania	5.332	1

Rank	Association	Coeff.	Teams
36	Iceland	4.832	1
37	Macedonia	4.497	1
38	Republic of Ireland	4.164	1
39	Belarus	4.082	1
40	Liechtenstein	4.000	0
41	Armenia	2.998	1
42	Malta	2.998	1
43	Albania	2.665	1
44	Estonia	2.498	1
45	Northern Ireland	2.165	1
46	Wales	1.832	1
47	Luxembourg	1.665	1
48	Azerbaijan	1.332	1
49	Kazakhstan	0.999	1
50	Faroe Islands	0.666	1
51	Andorra	0.000	0
52	San Marino	0.000	0

=== Distribution ===
Since the title holders (Barcelona) qualified for the Champions League group stage through their domestic league, the group stage spot reserved for the title holders is vacated, and the following changes to the default access list are made:

- The champions of association 10 (Scotland) are promoted from the third qualifying round to the group stage.
- The champions of association 16 (Israel) are promoted from the second qualifying round to the third qualifying round.
- The champions of associations 26 and 27 (Sweden and Slovakia) are promoted from the first qualifying round to the second qualifying round.

	Teams entering in this round	Teams advancing from previous round
First qualifying round (22 teams)	22 champions from associations 28–50 (except Liechtenstein)	
Second qualifying round (28 teams)	11 champions from associations 17–27; 6 runners-up from associations 10–15	11 winners from the first qualifying round
Third qualifying round (32 teams)	6 champions from associations 11–16; 3 runners-up from associations 7–9; 6 third-place finishers from associations 1–6; 3 fourth-place finishers from associations 1–3	14 winners from the second qualifying round
Group stage (32 teams)	10 champions from associations 1–10 (including title holders Barcelona); 6 runners-up from associations 1–6	16 winners from the third qualifying round
Knockout phase (16 teams)		8 group winners from the group stage; 8 group runners-up from the group stage

=== Teams ===
Group stage
(Spain) Barcelona (1st)^{TH}	(Italy) Internazionale (1st)	(Germany) Bayern Munich (1st)	(Netherlands) PSV Eindhoven (1st)
(Spain) Real Madrid (2nd)	(Italy) Roma (2nd)	(Germany) Werder Bremen (2nd)	(Greece) Olympiacos (1st)
(England) Chelsea (1st)	(France) Lyon (1st)	(Portugal) Porto (1st)	(Belgium) Anderlecht (1st)
(England) Manchester United (2nd)	(France) Bordeaux (2nd)	(Portugal) Sporting CP (2nd)	(Scotland) Celtic (1st)
Third qualifying round
(Spain) Valencia (3rd)	(Italy) Chievo (4th)	(Greece) AEK Athens (2nd)	(Russia) CSKA Moscow (1st)
(Spain) Osasuna (4th)	(France) Lille (3rd)	(Belgium) Standard Liège (2nd)	Austria Wien (1st)
(England) Liverpool (3rd)	(Germany) Hamburger SV (3rd)	(Turkey) Galatasaray (1st)	(Ukraine) Shakhtar Donetsk (1st)
(England) Arsenal (4th)	(Portugal) Benfica (3rd)	(Czech Republic) Slovan Liberec (1st)	(Israel) Maccabi Haifa (1st)
(Italy) Milan (3rd)	(Netherlands) Ajax (PO)		
Second qualifying round
(Scotland) Heart of Midlothian (2nd)	(Ukraine) Dynamo Kyiv (2nd)	(Norway) Vålerenga (1st)	(Hungary) Debrecen (1st)
(Turkey) Fenerbahçe (2nd)	(Serbia) Red Star Belgrade (1st)	(Bulgaria) Levski Sofia (1st)	(Romania) F.C. Steaua București (1st)
(Czech Republic) Mladá Boleslav (2nd)	(Poland) Legia Warsaw (1st)	(Croatia) Dinamo Zagreb (1st)	(Sweden) Djurgårdens IF (1st)
(Russia) Spartak Moscow (2nd)	(Switzerland) Zürich (1st)	(Denmark) Copenhagen (1st)	(Slovakia) Ružomberok (1st)
(Austria) Red Bull Salzburg (2nd)			
First qualifying round
(Slovenia) HIT Gorica (1st)	(Georgia (country)) Sioni Bolnisi (1st)	(Armenia) Pyunik (1st)	(Wales) The New Saints (1st)
(Cyprus) Apollon Limassol (1st)	(Lithuania) Ekranas (1st)	(Malta) Birkirkara (1st)	(Luxembourg) F91 Dudelange (1st)
(Bosnia and Herzegovina) Široki Brijeg (1st)	(Iceland) FH (1st)	(Albania) Elbasani (1st)	(Azerbaijan) Baku (1st)
(Latvia) Liepājas Metalurgs (1st)	(North Macedonia) Rabotnicki (1st)	(Estonia) TVMK (1st)	(Faroe Islands) B36 (1st)
(Finland) MYPA (1st)	(Republic of Ireland) Cork City (1st)	(Northern Ireland) Linfield (1st)	(Kazakhstan) Aktobe (1st)
(Moldova) Sheriff Tiraspol (1st)	(Belarus) Shakhtyor Soligorsk (1st)		

Notes

1. Italy (ITA): Based on the initial final league positions, Juventus and Milan earned direct entries to the Group Stage, while Internazionale and Fiorentina earned berths in a Third qualifying round. Following 2006 Italian football scandal investigations (resulting in a massive points deductions), Juventus and Fiorentina lost their entries entirely while Milan was demoted to Third qualifying round. Internazionale were promoted to the Group Stage. Roma were promoted from UEFA Cup to Champions League Group stage. Chievo were promoted from UEFA Cup to Champions League Third qualifying round.
2. Serbia (SRB): Red Star Belgrade qualified for this season's UEFA competitions through Serbia and Montenegro's domestic league, but represented its official successor Serbia, due to Montenegro becoming an independent nation on 3 June 2006.

== Round and draw dates ==
The schedule of the competition was as follows (all draws were held at UEFA headquarters in Nyon, Switzerland, unless stated otherwise).

Phase	Round	Draw date	First leg	Second leg
Qualifying	First qualifying round	23 June 2006	11–12 July 2006	18–19 July 2006
Qualifying	Second qualifying round	23 June 2006	25–26 July 2006	1–2 August 2006
Qualifying	Third qualifying round	28 July 2006	8–9 August 2006	22–23 August 2006
Group stage	Matchday 1	24 August 2006 (Monaco)	12–13 September 2006	
Group stage	Matchday 2	24 August 2006 (Monaco)	26–27 September 2006	
Group stage	Matchday 3	24 August 2006 (Monaco)	17–18 October 2006	
Group stage	Matchday 4	24 August 2006 (Monaco)	31 October – 1 November 2006	
Group stage	Matchday 5	24 August 2006 (Monaco)	21–22 November 2006	
Group stage	Matchday 6	24 August 2006 (Monaco)	5–6 December 2006	
Knockout phase	Round of 16	15 December 2006	20–21 February 2007	6–7 March 2007
Knockout phase	Quarter-finals	9 March 2007	3–4 April 2007	10–11 April 2007
Knockout phase	Semi-finals	9 March 2007	24–25 April 2007	1–2 May 2007
Knockout phase	Final	9 March 2007	23 May 2007 at Olympic Stadium, Athens	

== Qualifying rounds ==
=== First qualifying round ===
The first legs were played on 11 and 12 July 2006, with the second legs on 18 and 19 July.

Team 1	Agg.	Team 2	1st leg	2nd leg
Elbasani (Albania)	1–3	(Lithuania) Ekranas	1–0	0–3
TVMK (Estonia)	3–4	(Iceland) FH	2–3	1–1
Liepājas Metalurgs (Latvia)	2–1	(Kazakhstan) Aktobe	1–0	1–1
MYPA (Finland)	2–0	(Wales) The New Saints	1–0	1–0
Cork City (Republic of Ireland)	2–1	(Cyprus) Apollon Limassol	1–0	1–1
Sioni Bolnisi (Georgia (country))	2–1	(Azerbaijan) Baku	2–0	0–1
F91 Dudelange (Luxembourg)	0–1	(North Macedonia) Rabotnicki	0–1	0–0
Shakhtyor Soligorsk (Belarus)	0–2	(Bosnia and Herzegovina) Široki Brijeg	0–1	0–1
Birkirkara (Malta)	2–5	(Faroe Islands) B36	0–3	2–2
Linfield (Northern Ireland)	3–5	(Slovenia) HIT Gorica	1–3	2–2
Pyunik (Armenia)	0–2	(Moldova) Sheriff Tiraspol	0–0	0–2

=== Second qualifying round ===
The first legs were played on 25 and 26 July 2006, with the second legs on 1 and 2 August.

Team 1	Agg.	Team 2	1st leg	2nd leg
HIT Gorica (Slovenia)	0–5	(Romania) Steaua București	0–2	0–3
Levski Sofia (Bulgaria)	4–0	(Georgia (country)) Sioni Bolnisi	2–0	2–0
Zürich (Switzerland)	2–3	(Austria) Red Bull Salzburg	2–1	0–2
Djurgårdens IF (Sweden)	2–3	(Slovakia) Ružomberok	1–0	1–3
Debrecen (Hungary)	2–5	(North Macedonia) Rabotnicki	1–1	1–4
Cork City (Republic of Ireland)	0–4	(Serbia) Red Star Belgrade	0–1	0–3
Fenerbahçe (Turkey)	9–0	(Faroe Islands) B36	4–0	5–0
Mladá Boleslav (Czech Republic)	5–3	(Norway) Vålerenga	3–1	2–2
Sheriff Tiraspol (Moldova)	1–1 (a)	(Russia) Spartak Moscow	1–1	0–0
Liepājas Metalurgs (Latvia)	1–8	(Ukraine) Dynamo Kyiv	1–4	0–4
FH (Iceland)	0–3	(Poland) Legia Warsaw	0–1	0–2
Copenhagen (Denmark)	4–2	(Finland) MYPA	2–0	2–2
Ekranas (Lithuania)	3–9	(Croatia) Dinamo Zagreb	1–4	2–5
Heart of Midlothian (Scotland)	3–0	(Bosnia and Herzegovina) Široki Brijeg	3–0	0–0

=== Third qualifying round ===
The first legs were played on 8 and 9 August 2006, with the second legs on 22 and 23 August. The teams eliminated in this round qualified for the first round of the UEFA Cup.

Team 1	Agg.	Team 2	1st leg	2nd leg
Slovan Liberec (Czech Republic)	1–2	(Russia) Spartak Moscow	0–0	1–2
Shakhtar Donetsk (Ukraine)	4–2	(Poland) Legia Warsaw	1–0	3–2
Red Bull Salzburg (Austria)	1–3	(Spain) Valencia	1–0	0–3
Levski Sofia (Bulgaria)	4–2	(Italy) Chievo	2–0	2–2
Heart of Midlothian (Scotland)	1–5	(Greece) AEK Athens	1–2	0–3
CSKA Moscow (Russia)	5–0	(Slovakia) Ružomberok	3–0	2–0
Milan (Italy)	3–1	(Serbia) Red Star Belgrade	1–0	2–1
Galatasaray (Turkey)	6–3	(Czech Republic) Mladá Boleslav	5–2	1–1
Standard Liège (Belgium)	3–4	(Romania) Steaua București	2–2	1–2
Austria Wien	1–4	(Portugal) Benfica	1–1	0–3
Dinamo Zagreb (Croatia)	1–5	(England) Arsenal	0–3	1–2
Copenhagen (Denmark)	3–2	(Netherlands) Ajax	1–2	2–0
Hamburger SV (Germany)	1–1 (a)	(Spain) Osasuna	0–0	1–1
Dynamo Kyiv (Ukraine)	5–3	(Turkey) Fenerbahçe	3–1	2–2
Liverpool (England)	3–2	(Israel) Maccabi Haifa	2–1	1–1
Lille (France)	4–0	(North Macedonia) Rabotnicki	3–0	1–0

== Group stage ==
Location of teams of the 2006–07 UEFA Champions League group stage.
Brown: Group A; Red: Group B; Orange: Group C; Yellow: Group D;
Green: Group E; Blue: Group F; Purple: Group G; Pink: Group H.

The draw for this round was held on 24 August 2006 in Monaco. The first matches were played on 12 September 2006, and the stage concluded on 6 December.

The top two teams in each group advanced to the knockout stage, and the third-placed teams entered the round of 32 of the UEFA Cup. Based on paragraph 4.05 in the UEFA regulations, if two or more teams are equal on points on completion of the group matches, the following criteria are applied to determine the rankings:

1. higher number of points obtained in the group matches played among the teams in question;
2. superior goal difference from the group matches played among the teams in question;
3. higher number of goals scored away from home in the group matches played among the teams in question;
4. superior goal difference from all group matches played;
5. higher number of goals scored in all group matches played;
6. higher number of coefficient points accumulated by the club in question, as well as its association, over the previous five seasons.

Copenhagen and Levski Sofia both made their debut appearances in the group stage. Levski were the first Bulgarian club to appear in the Champions League group stage.

=== Group A ===
Pos	Team	Pld	W	D	L	GF	GA	GD	Pts	Qualification	CHE	BAR	BRM	LSO
1	(England) Chelsea	6	4	1	1	10	4	+6	13	Advance to knockout stage	—	1–0	2–0	2–0
2	(Spain) Barcelona	6	3	2	1	12	4	+8	11	Advance to knockout stage	2–2	—	2–0	5–0
3	(Germany) Werder Bremen	6	3	1	2	7	5	+2	10	Transfer to UEFA Cup	1–0	1–1	—	2–0
4	(Bulgaria) Levski Sofia	6	0	0	6	1	17	−16	0		1–3	0–2	0–3	—

Source: RSSSF

=== Group B ===
Pos	Team	Pld	W	D	L	GF	GA	GD	Pts	Qualification	BAY	INT	SPM	SPO
1	(Germany) Bayern Munich	6	3	3	0	10	3	+7	12	Advance to knockout stage	—	1–1	4–0	0–0
2	(Italy) Internazionale	6	3	1	2	5	5	0	10	Advance to knockout stage	0–2	—	2–1	1–0
3	(Russia) Spartak Moscow	6	1	2	3	7	11	−4	5	Transfer to UEFA Cup	2–2	0–1	—	1–1
4	(Portugal) Sporting CP	6	1	2	3	3	6	−3	5		0–1	1–0	1–3	—

Source: RSSSF

=== Group C ===
Pos	Team	Pld	W	D	L	GF	GA	GD	Pts	Qualification	LIV	PSV	BOR	GAL
1	(England) Liverpool	6	4	1	1	11	5	+6	13	Advance to knockout stage	—	2–0	3–0	3–2
2	(Netherlands) PSV Eindhoven	6	3	1	2	6	6	0	10	Advance to knockout stage	0–0	—	1–3	2–0
3	(France) Bordeaux	6	2	1	3	6	7	−1	7	Transfer to UEFA Cup	0–1	0–1	—	3–1
4	(Turkey) Galatasaray	6	1	1	4	7	12	−5	4		3–2	1–2	0–0	—

Source: RSSSF

=== Group D ===
Pos	Team	Pld	W	D	L	GF	GA	GD	Pts	Qualification	VAL	ROM	SHK	OLY
1	(Spain) Valencia	6	4	1	1	12	6	+6	13	Advance to knockout stage	—	2–1	2–0	2–0
2	(Italy) Roma	6	3	1	2	8	4	+4	10	Advance to knockout stage	1–0	—	4–0	1–1
3	(Ukraine) Shakhtar Donetsk	6	1	3	2	6	11	−5	6	Transfer to UEFA Cup	2–2	1–0	—	2–2
4	(Greece) Olympiacos	6	0	3	3	6	11	−5	3		2–4	0–1	1–1	—

Source: RSSSF

=== Group E ===
Pos	Team	Pld	W	D	L	GF	GA	GD	Pts	Qualification	LYO	RMA	STE	DKV
1	(France) Lyon	6	4	2	0	12	3	+9	14	Advance to knockout stage	—	2–0	1–1	1–0
2	(Spain) Real Madrid	6	3	2	1	14	8	+6	11	Advance to knockout stage	2–2	—	1–0	5–1
3	(Romania) Steaua București	6	1	2	3	7	11	−4	5	Transfer to UEFA Cup	0–3	1–4	—	1–1
4	(Ukraine) Dynamo Kyiv	6	0	2	4	5	16	−11	2		0–3	2–2	1–4	—

Source: RSSSF

=== Group F ===
Pos	Team	Pld	W	D	L	GF	GA	GD	Pts	Qualification	MUN	CEL	BEN	CPH
1	(England) Manchester United	6	4	0	2	10	5	+5	12	Advance to knockout stage	—	3–2	3–1	3–0
2	(Scotland) Celtic	6	3	0	3	8	9	−1	9	Advance to knockout stage	1–0	—	3–0	1–0
3	(Portugal) Benfica	6	2	1	3	7	8	−1	7	Transfer to UEFA Cup	0–1	3–0	—	3–1
4	(Denmark) Copenhagen	6	2	1	3	5	8	−3	7		1–0	3–1	0–0	—

Source: RSSSF

=== Group G ===
Pos	Team	Pld	W	D	L	GF	GA	GD	Pts	Qualification	ARS	POR	CSKA	HAM
1	(England) Arsenal	6	3	2	1	7	3	+4	11	Advance to knockout stage	—	2–0	0–0	3–1
2	(Portugal) Porto	6	3	2	1	9	4	+5	11	Advance to knockout stage	0–0	—	0–0	4–1
3	(Russia) CSKA Moscow	6	2	2	2	4	5	−1	8	Transfer to UEFA Cup	1–0	0–2	—	1–0
4	(Germany) Hamburger SV	6	1	0	5	7	15	−8	3		1–2	1–3	3–2	—

Source: RSSSF

=== Group H ===
Pos	Team	Pld	W	D	L	GF	GA	GD	Pts	Qualification	MIL	LIL	AEK	AND
1	(Italy) Milan	6	3	1	2	8	4	+4	10	Advance to knockout stage	—	0–2	3–0	4–1
2	(France) Lille	6	2	3	1	8	5	+3	9	Advance to knockout stage	0–0	—	3–1	2–2
3	(Greece) AEK Athens	6	2	2	2	6	9	−3	8	Transfer to UEFA Cup	1–0	1–0	—	1–1
4	(Belgium) Anderlecht	6	0	4	2	7	11	−4	4		0–1	1–1	2–2	—

Source: RSSSF

== Knockout phase ==
All knockout rounds are two-legged, except for the final. In the event of aggregate scores being equal after normal time in the second leg, the winning team will be that which scored more goals on their away leg: if the scores in the two matches were identical, extra time is played. The away goals rule also applies if scores are equal at the end of extra time. If there are no goals scored in extra time, the tie is decided on a penalty shootout.

The final was played over just one match, with extra time in case of a draw after 90 minutes. If the teams were still level following extra time, a penalty shootout would have determined the winner.

=== Bracket ===
Round of 16
(Italy) Roma	0	2	2
(France) Lyon	0	0	0
(France) Lille	0	0	0
(England) Manchester United	1	1	2
(Scotland) Celtic	0	0	0
(Italy) Milan (a.e.t.)	0	1	1
(Spain) Real Madrid	3	1	4
(Germany) Bayern Munich (a)	2	2	4
(Portugal) Porto	1	1	2
(England) Chelsea	1	2	3
(Italy) Internazionale	2	0	2
(Spain) Valencia (a)	2	0	2
(Netherlands) PSV Eindhoven	1	1	2
(England) Arsenal	0	1	1
(Spain) Barcelona	1	1	2
(England) Liverpool (a)	2	0	2

Quarter-finals
(Italy) Roma	2	1	3
(England) Manchester United	1	7	8
(Italy) Milan	2	2	4
(Germany) Bayern Munich	2	0	2
(England) Chelsea	1	2	3
(Spain) Valencia	1	1	2
(Netherlands) PSV Eindhoven	0	0	0
(England) Liverpool	3	1	4

Semi-finals
(England) Manchester United	3	0	3
(Italy) Milan	2	3	5
(England) Chelsea	1	0	1 (1)
(England) Liverpool (p)	0	1	1 (4)

Final
23 May – Athens
(Italy) Milan	2
(England) Liverpool	1

=== Round of 16 ===
The draw for the first knockout round of the competition took place on 15 December 2006 in Nyon, Switzerland. The team drawn first in each tie plays the first leg of their tie at home, and the second leg away.

On 8 February 2007, the Italian government announced that the San Siro in Milan was unsafe for spectators after the rioting that had occurred during and after a league match in Catania six days earlier. As a result, the venues of the first leg of the Inter-Valencia tie scheduled for 21 February and the second leg of the Celtic-Milan tie scheduled for 7 March were thrown into doubt. Various proposals and offers of the use of stadia outside Italy were made, but it was finally agreed that the Inter-Valencia tie would be played at the San Siro with a reduced capacity of 36,000. After further work at the San Siro, Italian authorities and UEFA announced that the second leg of Celtic-Milan would go ahead at the stadium, at its full capacity of 85,700. 4,500 seats were reserved for Celtic supporters.

The first legs were played on 20 and 21 February 2007, with the second legs on 6 and 7 March.

Team 1	Agg.	Team 2	1st leg	2nd leg
Porto (Portugal)	2–3	(England) Chelsea	1–1	1–2
Celtic (Scotland)	0–1	(Italy) Milan	0–0	0–1 (a.e.t.)
PSV Eindhoven (Netherlands)	2–1	(England) Arsenal	1–0	1–1
Lille (France)	0–2	(England) Manchester United	0–1	0–1
Roma (Italy)	2–0	(France) Lyon	0–0	2–0
Barcelona (Spain)	2–2 (a)	(England) Liverpool	1–2	1–0
Real Madrid (Spain)	4–4 (a)	(Germany) Bayern Munich	3–2	1–2
Internazionale (Italy)	2–2 (a)	(Spain) Valencia	2–2	0–0

=== Quarter-finals ===
The draw for the final stages, including the quarter-finals, semi-finals and final, was held on 9 March 2007 in Athens, Greece. The draw was conducted by ad interim UEFA CEO Gianni Infantino, assisted by Friedrich Stickler, chairman of the UEFA Club Competitions Committee. Theodoros Zagorakis, the captain of Greece in Euro 2004, was appointed ambassador for the final.

The first legs were played on 3 and 4 April, and the second legs were played on 10 and 11 April 2007.

Team 1	Agg.	Team 2	1st leg	2nd leg
Milan (Italy)	4–2	(Germany) Bayern Munich	2–2	2–0
PSV Eindhoven (Netherlands)	0–4	(England) Liverpool	0–3	0–1
Roma (Italy)	3–8	(England) Manchester United	2–1	1–7
Chelsea (England)	3–2	(Spain) Valencia	1–1	2–1

=== Semi-finals ===
The first legs were played on 24 and 25 April, with the second legs on 1 and 2 May 2007.

Team 1	Agg.	Team 2	1st leg	2nd leg
Chelsea (England)	1–1 (1–4 p)	(England) Liverpool	1–0	0–1 (a.e.t.)
Manchester United (England)	3–5	(Italy) Milan	3–2	0–3

=== Final ===
The final was played on 23 May 2007 at the Olympic Stadium in Athens, Greece. The final was contested by Milan of Italy and Liverpool of England. Milan scored first through Filippo Inzaghi just before half time. Inzaghi scored again in the 82nd minute, before Dirk Kuyt scored a late consolation goal a minute before full-time. As winners, Milan went on to represent UEFA at the 2007 FIFA Club World Cup.

23 May 2007
21:45 UTC+3

Milan (Italy)	2–1	(England) Liverpool
Inzaghi 45', 82'	Report	Kuyt 89'

Olympic Stadium, Athens
Attendance: 63,000
Referee: Herbert Fandel (Germany)

== Statistics ==
Statistics exclude qualifying rounds.

=== Top goalscorers ===
Rank	Player	Team	Goals	Minutes played
1	(Brazil) Kaká	(Italy) Milan	10	1082
2	(England) Peter Crouch	(England) Liverpool	6	576
2	(Netherlands) Ruud van Nistelrooy	(Spain) Real Madrid	6	584
2	(Spain) Fernando Morientes	(Spain) Valencia	6	620
2	(Ivory Coast) Didier Drogba	(England) Chelsea	6	1055
6	(Spain) Raúl	(Spain) Real Madrid	5	603
7	(Romania) Nicolae Dică	(Romania) F.C. Steaua București	4	532
7	(France) Louis Saha	(England) Manchester United	4	464
7	(Peru) Claudio Pizarro	(Germany) Bayern Munich	4	620
7	(Italy) Filippo Inzaghi	(Italy) Milan	4	673
7	(Spain) David Villa	(Spain) Valencia	4	702
7	(Italy) Francesco Totti	(Italy) Roma	4	800
7	(England) Wayne Rooney	(England) Manchester United	4	1062

=== Squad of the season ===
UEFA's Technical Study Group selected the following 21 players for the 2006–07 UEFA Champions League Team of the Tournament.

Pos.	Player	Team
GK	(Czech Republic) Petr Čech	(England) Chelsea
GK	(Spain) Pepe Reina	(England) Liverpool
GK	(Brazil) Dida	(Italy) AC Milan
DF	(Portugal) Ricardo Carvalho	(England) Chelsea
DF	(England) John Terry	(England) Chelsea
DF	(England) Jamie Carragher	(England) Liverpool
DF	(Serbia) Nemanja Vidić	(England) Manchester United
DF	(Italy) Alessandro Nesta	(Italy) AC Milan
DF	(Italy) Paolo Maldini	(Italy) AC Milan
MF	(Netherlands) Clarence Seedorf	(Italy) AC Milan
MF	(Italy) Gennaro Gattuso	(Italy) AC Milan
MF	(England) Frank Lampard	(England) Chelsea
MF	(Italy) Andrea Pirlo	(Italy) AC Milan
MF	(England) Paul Scholes	(England) Manchester United
MF	(England) Steven Gerrard	(England) Liverpool
FW	(Ivory Coast) Didier Drogba	(England) Chelsea
FW	(Portugal) Cristiano Ronaldo	(England) Manchester United
FW	(Spain) David Villa	(Spain) Valencia
FW	(England) Wayne Rooney	(England) Manchester United
FW	(Italy) Francesco Totti	(Italy) Roma
FW	(Brazil) Kaká	(Italy) AC Milan

== See also ==
- 2006–07 UEFA Cup
- 2006 UEFA Intertoto Cup
- 2006–07 UEFA Women's Cup
