= Kostas Kaiafas =

Cypriot footballer

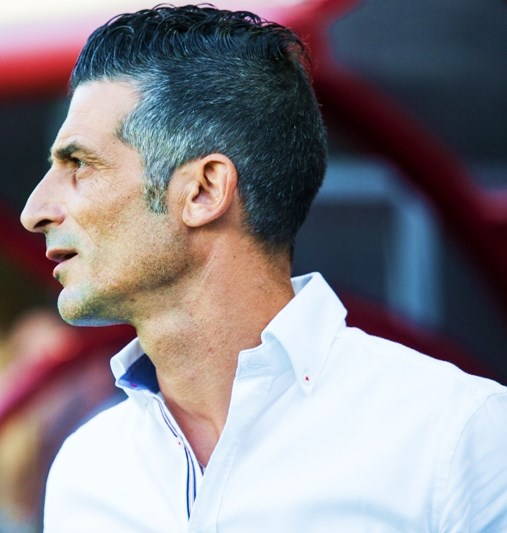

Personal information
- Full name: Konstantinos Kaiafas
- Date of birth: 22 September 1974 (age 52)
- Place of birth: Nicosia, Cyprus
- Height: 1.77 m (5 ft 10 in)
- Position: Midfielder

Youth career
- AC Omonia

Senior career*
Years	Team	Apps	(Gls)
1991–2009	AC Omonia	347	(68)
2009–2011	Alki Larnaca	25	(10)
Total		372	(78)

International career
1997–2005	Cyprus	23	(1)

Managerial career
- 2011–2013: Alki Larnaca (assistant manager)
- 2013–2014: Alki Larnaca
- 2014–2015: AC Omonia
- 2016: Aris Limassol
- 2016–2017: Enosis Neon Paralimni
- 2017–2018: Ermis Aradippou
- 2019-2020: Alki Oroklini
- 2020-: ENAD Polis Chrysochous FC
- * Club domestic league appearances and goals

Kostas Kaiafas (Greek: Κώστας Καϊάφας; born 22 September 1974 in Nicosia) is a Cypriot former football player and manager.

As a player, he was a midfielder for Omonia and Alki Larnaca. He was the captain of Omonia and the second longest servant in the history of the club, only five appearances short of becoming Omonoia's all-time record holder.

== Playing career ==
Kaiafas came through the AC Omonia academies, playing at first as a right midfielder but then moving to the centre as a defensive midfielder. 2008–2009 was his last season with Omonia, as manager Takis Lemonis let him know that he is no longer included in his squad, and decided to announce his retirement from the team in June 2009. His final game with Omonia was a friendly match against the Lithuanian champions Ekranas, on 7 July 2009.

Although, later he came out of retirement and signed a contract with Alki, a team from Larnaca, that was playing in the Cypriot Second Division during the season 2009–10. He played a major role and captain the team to the league championship and promotion to First Division.

During 2010–11, he became the first and only member of the Kaiafas family, to play against Omonia, on 18 September 2010, despite having said that he never wishes to do so. The match was held at Antonis Papadopoulos Stadium, and despite playing as opponent, Kaiafas was very well accepted by Omonia fans.

In the same season, Kaiafas was a key figure for Alki, but on 29 November 2010 he was involved in an infamous incident which attracted headlines and controversy in Cyprus. In a home match against Ermis Aradippou, he was sent off for pushing and swearing at the referee, after the away team scored the winning goal. Kaiafas was suspended for six months, which ruled him out of first team action, resulting to an inglorious end to his career.

== Managerial career ==
Immediately after Kaiafas ended his career as football player, he took over Alki as manager, however not being holder of the UEFA Pro Licence, he was reported as assistant of Radmilo Ivančević. The duo stayed at Alki until they resigned at 3 December 2012.

Later in the same season (2012/13), Kaiafas was appointed on 4 April 2013, as first manager for Alki Larnaca. After terrible season with Alki during 2013/14, due to the heavy financial problems the club was facing, Kaiafas returned to Omonia on 12 March 2014, taking over as manager.

== Personal life ==
He is the son of Sotiris Kaiafas, winner of 1975/76 European Golden Boot.

== Omonia statistics ==
Club	Season	League		Cup		Europe		National	
Club	Season	Apps	Goals	Apps	Goals	Apps	Goals	Apps	Goals
AC Omonia	1991–92	6	1	2	0	-	-	-	-
AC Omonia	1992–93	13	1	2	0	-	-	-	-
AC Omonia	1993–94	16	1	3	1	-	-	-	-
AC Omonia	1994–95	28	5	6	3	4	0	-	-
AC Omonia	1995–96	23	3	6	1	3	0	-	-
AC Omonia	1996–97	20	3	6	2	-	-	-	-
AC Omonia	1997–98	19	8	3	0	-	-	3	1
AC Omonia	1998–99	21	3	?	?	4	0	-	-
AC Omonia	1999–00	18	1	?	?	4	1	3	0
AC Omonia	2000–01	8	1	?	?	1	0	1	0
AC Omonia	2001–02	22	2	?	?	2	1	4	0
AC Omonia	2002–03	23	10	?	?	-	-	7	0
AC Omonia	2003–04	20	7	?	?	4	0	2	0
AC Omonia	2004–05	23	6	?	?	4	1	3	0
AC Omonia	2005–06	22	4	?	?	4	1	-	-
AC Omonia	2006–07	23	2	?	?	4	0	-	-
AC Omonia	2007–08	26	6	?	?	4	2	-	-
AC Omonia	2008–09	21	4	?	?	2	0	-	-
Career total		347	68	?	?	40	6	23	1

== Goals in European competitions ==
No.	Date	Venue	Opponent	Score	Result	Competition
1.	12 August 1999	National Olympic Stadium, Minsk, Belarus	(Belarus) Belshina Bobruisk	1 - 4	1 - 5	1999–2000 UEFA Cup qualifying round
2.	31 July 2001	Red Star Stadium, Belgrad, Serbia	(Serbia) Red Star Belgrade	1 - 1	2 - 1	2001–02 UEFA Champions League qualifying rounds
3.	29 July 2004	Gradski Stadion, Skopje, North Macedonia	(North Macedonia) Sloga Jugomagnat	1 - 3	1 - 4	2004–05 UEFA Cup qualifying rounds
4.	25 August 2005	GSP Stadium, Nicosia, Cyprus	(Romania) Dinamo București	1 - 0	2 - 1	2005–06 UEFA Cup qualifying rounds
5.	19 July 2007	GSP Stadium, Nicosia, Cyprus	(Montenegro) FK Rudar	1 - 0	2 - 0	2007–08 UEFA Cup qualifying rounds
6.	16 Aug 2007	GSP Stadium, Nicosia, Cyprus	(Bulgaria) CSKA Sofia	1 - 1	1 - 1	2007–08 UEFA Cup qualifying rounds

- Kaiafas' first league game was on 18 January 1992 against Alki. Omonia won 2–0 and he scored the second goal, the first of his career. His last game was on 2 May 2009 against Anorthosis. Omonia won 1–0 and he scored the winning goal, the last of his career.
- Kaiafas' first international appearance was a friendly match against Greece on 19 August 1997 in Heraklion. His first and only goal was scored on 2 February 1998 during a friendly match against Slovenia, which Cyprus won 1–0. His last game with Cyprus was on 17 November 2004 in a defeat against Israel.
- Kaiafas totalled 498 appearances with Omonia, only five behind the all-time record owned by Andreas Kanaris with 503 appearances. He did however overtake his father, Sotiris Kaiafas, who made 476 appearances for the club.

== Honours ==
- Cypriot Championship (3): 1993, 2001, 2003
- Cypriot Cup (4): 1991, 1994, 2000, 2005
- Cyprus FA Shield (4): 1991, 1994, 2001, 2005
- Football Player of the Year : 2003 (awarded by Cyprus Sports Journalists)
