= FK Rapid Bratislava =

- Full name: Futbalový klub Rapid Bratislava
- Founded: 1931 as Športový klub Prievoz
- Dissolved: 2005
- Ground: Štadión Rapid, Bratislava
- Capacity: 3,000
- 2004–05: Slovak Second Division, 13th
Home colours

FK Rapid Bratislava was a Slovak association football club. The club was based in a quiet part of Ružinov, Bratislava. It was founded in 1931 as ŠK Prievoz.

Although not very successful in the recent years, it was a club with decent history. Its greatest success were two seasons (2003/2004 and 2004/2005) spent in the Slovak Second Division.

In 2005, the club was dissolved due to merging with Artmedia Bratislava.
