= Mariusz Ujek =

Polish footballer

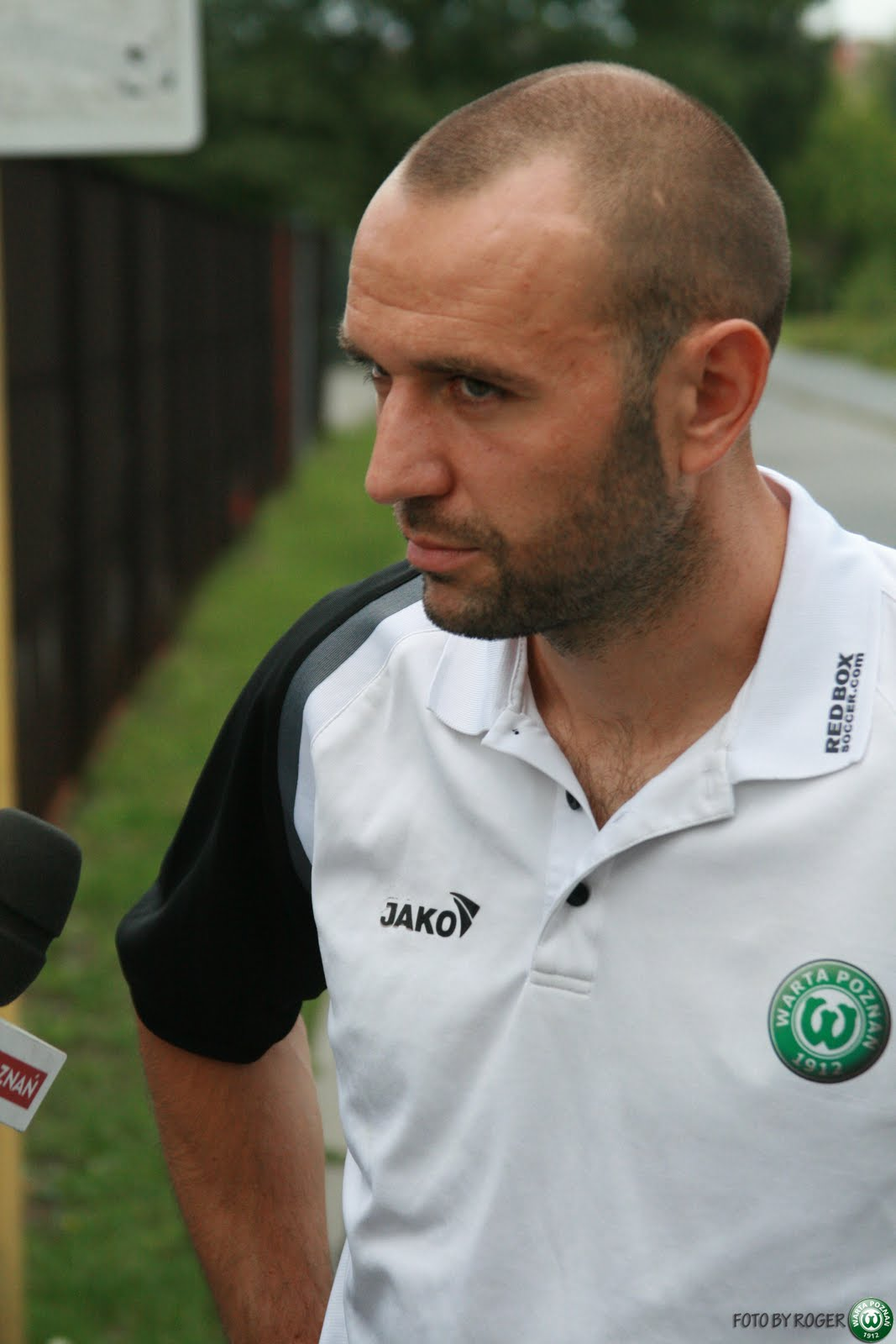

Personal information
- Full name: Mariusz Ujek
- Date of birth: 6 December 1977 (age 48)
- Place of birth: Lubin, Poland
- Height: 1.83 m (6 ft 0 in)
- Position: Forward

Senior career*
Years	Team	Apps	(Gls)
1995	Stal Chocianów		
1996	Zagłębie Lubin	3	(0)
1997	Chrobry Głogów		
1997–1998	BKS Bolesławiec		
1998	FC Singen 04		
1999	RKS Radomsko		
1999	Kuźnia Jawor		
2000–2001	Górnik Polkowice		
2002	Odra Opole		
2002–2005	Zagłębie Sosnowiec		
2005–2010	GKS Bełchatów	97	(16)
2010	Polonia Bytom	8	(3)
2011	Warta Poznań	10	(1)
2012	Włókniarz Zelów	10	(4)
2013	Zjednoczeni Bełchatów		
2013–2014	Polonia Warsaw		
- * Club domestic league appearances and goals

Mariusz Ujek (born 6 December 1977) is a Polish former professional footballer who played as a forward.

== Career ==
=== Club ===
He signed a one-year contract with Polonia Bytom on 27 August 2010. He was released from Polonia on 1 February 2011.

In July 2011, he joined Warta Poznań.
