= Mats Hedén =

Swedish footballer

Personal information
- Date of birth: 20 May 1976 (age 50)
- Place of birth: Sweden
- Height: 1.82 m (6 ft 0 in)
- Position: Defender

Senior career*
Years	Team	Apps	(Gls)
1998–2000	Västra Frölunda	56	(0)
2005–2006	BK Häcken	44	(0)
Total		100	(0)
- * Club domestic league appearances and goals

Mats Hedén (born 20 May 1976) is a Swedish former professional footballer who played as a defender for Västra Frölunda and BK Häcken in the Allsvenskan.
