= Abdullahi Ishaka =

Nigerian footballer

Personal information
- Full name: Abdullahi Ishaka Salihu
- Date of birth: 3 March 1984 (age 42)
- Place of birth: Lagos, Nigeria
- Height: 1.78 m (5 ft 10 in)
- Position: Midfielder

Senior career*
Years	Team	Apps	(Gls)
2001–2003	Swift Eagles		
2003–2004	Besa Kavajë		
2004–2005	Shkumbini Peqin		
2005–2006	Besa Kavajë		
2006	Partizani Tirana		
2006–2007	KF Elbasani		
2007–2008	Besa Kavajë		
2008–2009	FC Haka	5	(1)
2009–2010	AmaZulu	6	(0)

International career
	Nigeria U17	3	
- * Club domestic league appearances and goals

Abdullahi Ishaka (born 3 March 1984 in Lagos) is a Nigerian footballer.

== Career ==
Before moving to Valkeakoski, the midfielder played for Albanian club KS Besa Kavajë which plays in Albanian Superliga. Ishaka has also played in Nigeria U17 National soccer team and a few games in UEFA competitions. First two games with KF Partizani Tirana in the 2006–07 UEFA Intertoto Cup. In the season 2007–2008, he played three games in UEFA Cup qualifiers with KS Besa Kavajë and scored a goal against FK Bezanija.

== International career ==
He is a former member of the Nigeria national under-17 football team.
