= Dragomir Stanković =

Serbian football referee (born 1972)

Dragomir Stanković (born 16 February 1972) is a Serbian football referee who officiates in the Serbian Superliga and is on the FIFA list. He has also refereed in the UEFA Cup.

Stankovic served as a referee during 2010 World Cup qualifying, supervising the match between San Marino and Northern Ireland.
