= Amadeusz Kłodawski =

Polish footballer

Personal information
- Date of birth: 3 March 1987 (age 39)
- Place of birth: Kostrzyn nad Odrą, Poland
- Height: 1.72 m (5 ft 8 in)
- Position: Winger

Youth career
- Celuloza Kostrzyn

Senior career*
Years	Team	Apps	(Gls)
2003–2005	Celuloza Kostrzyn		
2006	Polonia Słubice		
2006	Celuloza Kostrzyn		
2007–2008	Dyskobolia Grodzisk Wielkopolski	4	(0)
2008–2009	Polonia Warsaw	0	(0)
2009	Polonia Słubice	8	(0)
2010	Ilanka Rzepin	2	(0)
2011	Warta Słońsk		
2011–2012	SV 07 Eschwege		
2013	Stilon Gorzów Wielkopolski		
2014–2016	SV Victoria Seelow		
2017–2018	BSV Blau-Weiß Podelzig		
- * Club domestic league appearances and goals

Amadeusz Kłodawski (born 3 March 1987) is a Polish former professional footballer who played as a winger. He joined Polonia Warsaw in 2008 from Dyskobolia Grodzisk Wielkopolski. Kłodawski scored the only goal in the game against MKT Araz Imisli which earned Dyskobolia promotion to the next round of 2007–08 UEFA Cup.

Kłodawski made his debut in the Polish Ekstraklasa as a late game substitute in a match against Jagiellonia Białystok on 5 August 2007.

== Honours ==
Dyskobolia

- Ekstraklasa Cup: 2006–07, 2007–08
