= Roni (footballer, born November 1977) =

Brazilian footballer

Personal information
- Full name: Ronielle Faria Gomes
- Date of birth: 6 November 1977 (age 48)
- Place of birth: Lavras, Brazil
- Height: 1.77 m (5 ft 10 in)
- Position: Midfielder

Senior career*
Years	Team	Apps	(Gls)
2000	União São João		
2003	Caldense		(1)
2003	12 de Octubre		(6)
2004	NK Posušje		
2005	NK Zagreb		
2005–2008	Široki Brijeg		
2008–2009	América (MG)		
2009	Fabril		
2010	Morrinhos		
2010	Nacional (AM)		
2010	XV de Piracicaba		
2011	IAPE		
2011–2013	Araxá		
2013	Atlético Tricordiano		
- * Club domestic league appearances and goals

Ronielle Faria Gomes (born 6 November 1977) was a Brazilian former professional footballer who played as a midfielder.

== Career ==
Ronielle was born in Lavras. He played for Araxá in Minas Gerais before moved to Club 12 de Octubre in summer 2003.

Ronielle played for NK Posušje and NK Zagreb in 2004–05 season. He was signed by Široki Brijeg in summer 2005. Before going to Bosnia and Herzegovina again, he also trialed at FC Midtjylland.
