= Kalle Parviainen =

Finnish footballer (born 1982)

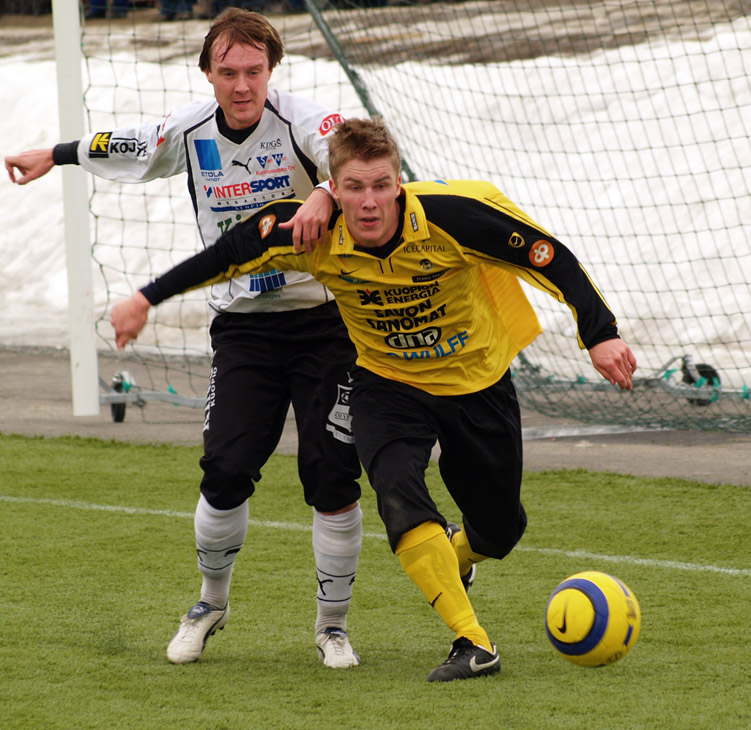
- Parviainen with KuPS in 2005

Personal information
- Date of birth: 3 October 1982 (age 44)
- Place of birth: Kuopio, Finland
- Height: 1.84 m (6 ft 1/2 in)
- Positions: Midfielder; striker; defender

Team information
- Current team: Inter Turku (sporting director)
- Number: 5

Senior career*
Years	Team	Apps	(Gls)
2001–2005	KuPS	117	(26)
2006–2010	Haka	63	(7)
2011–2013	Inter Turku	4	(0)

International career^{‡}
2010	Finland	1	(0)

Managerial career
- 2024–: Inter Turku (sporting director)
- * Club domestic league appearances and goals as of 29 June 2014 ‡ National team caps and goals as of 29 May 2010

Kalle Parviainen (born 3 October 1982) is a Finnish former professional football striker who currently works as the sporting director of the Veikkausliiga side Inter Turku in Finland.

While Parviainen was the leading scorer at his previous club, KuPS, he has played mostly as a defender at FC Haka. Versatile Parviainen played as a midfielder before becoming a striker. On 26 October 2010 he signed a three-year contract with FC Inter.

He made his national team debut on 29 May 2010, in a friendly against Poland.

After his retirement from playing career, Parviainen has worked as a youth coach and academy director of his former club Inter Turku, and for the Finnish FA. Currently he serves as a sporting director of Inter Turku since 2024.
