= 2006–07 FC Bayern Munich season =

107th season in existence of Bayern Munich

Bayern Munich
2006–07 season
- Chairman: Franz Beckenbauer
- Manager: Felix Magath; Ottmar Hitzfeld (from 1 February)
- Stadium: Allianz Arena
- Bundesliga: 4th
- DFB-Pokal: Third round
- DFL-Ligapokal: Runners-up
- UEFA Champions League: Quarter-finals
- Top goalscorer: League: Roy Makaay (16); All: Roy Makaay (18)
- Highest home attendance: 69,000
- Lowest home attendance: 51,000
Home colours	Away colours	Third colours

Bayern Munich went into the 2006–07 season with head coach Felix Magath. On 1 February 2007, Magath was sacked after disappointing domestic results including a third round exit from the cup. His predecessor, Ottmar Hitzfeld, was appointed to be his successor, too.

== Results ==
=== Bundesliga ===
Bayern hosted Borussia Dortmund in the opener of the 44th Bundesliga season on 11 August 2006. On the last day of play, on 19 May 2007, they won against Mainz 05, finishing in the fourth place, a position they held almost all through the second half of the season. The fourth-place finish qualified Bayern for the 2007–08 UEFA Cup.

1	Bayern Munich	2–0	Borussia Dortmund
	Makaay 24'; Schweinsteiger 55'

2	VfL Bochum	1–2	Bayern Munich
	Fábio Júnior 52'		Makaay 42'; Lahm 65'

3	Bayern Munich	0–0	1. FC Nürnberg

4	Arminia Bielefeld	2–1	Bayern Munich
	Wichniarek 25'; Kamper 84'		Van Bommel 6'

5	Bayern Munich	2–1	Alemannia Aachen
	Pizarro 39'; Van Bommel 55'		Dum 38'

6	VfL Wolfsburg	1–0	Bayern Munich
	Hanke 36'

7	Bayern Munich	4–2	Hertha BSC
	Makaay 9'; Sagnol 15'; Pizarro 53'; Podolski 78'		Fathi 58'; Pantelić 73'

8	Werder Bremen	3–1	Bayern Munich
	Diego 11'; Womé 34'; Lúcio 62' (o.g.)		Makaay 37'

9	Bayern Munich	2–0	Eintracht Frankfurt
	Makaay 24'; Van Bommel 29'

10	Schalke 04	2–2	Bayern Munich
	Løvenkrands 13'; Kobiashvili 20'		Ottl 45'; Makaay 52'

11	Bayern Munich	0–1	Hannover 96
			Huszti 43'

12	Bayer Leverkusen	2–3	Bayern Munich
	Kießling 48'; Athirson 80'		Salihamidžić 33'; Demichelis 83'; Pizarro 86'

13	Bayern Munich	2–1	VfB Stuttgart
	Makaay 27'; Pizarro 36'		Gómez 8'

14	Hamburger SV	1–2	Bayern Munich
	Van der Vaart 18' (pen.)		Makaay 57'; Pizarro 78'

15	Bayern Munich	1–1	Mönchengladbach
	Demichelis 23'		Delura 33'

16	Bayern Munich	2–1	Energie Cottbus
	Schweinsteiger 42'; Van Bommel 54'		Baumgart 53'

17	Mainz 05	0–4	Bayern Munichn
			Salihamidžić 31'; Makaay 45'; Pizarro 64'; Schweinsteiger 66'

18	Borussia Dortmund	3–2	Bayern Munich
	Frei 12', 57'; Tinga 59'		Van Buyten 25'; Makaay 42'

19	Bayern Munich	0–0	VfL Bochum

20	1. FC Nürnberg	3–0	Bayern Munich
	Saenko 12'; Schroth 71'; Vittek 86'

21	Bayern Munich	1–0	Arminia Bielefeld
	Makaay 8'

22	Alemannia Aachen	1–0	Bayern Munichn
	Klitzpera 10'

23	Bayern Munich	2–1	VfL Wolfsburg
	Podolski 26' (pen.); Van Bommel 54'		Makiadi 79'

24	Hertha Berlin	2–3	Bayern Munich
	Giménez 58'; Van Burik 82'		Salihamidžić 30'; Podolski 31'; Makaay 68'

25	Bayern Munich	1–1	Werder Bremen
	Podolski 7'		Rosenberg 66'

26	Eintracht Frankfurt	1–0	Bayern Munich
	Preuß 78'

27	Bayern Munich	2–0	Schalke 04
	Makaay 3'; Salihamidžić 78'

28	Hannover 96	1–2	Bayern Munich
	Bruggink 44'		Demichelis 53'; Schweinsteiger 71'

29	Bayern Munich	2–1	Bayer Leverkusen
	Van Bommel 30'; Makaay 47'		Voronin 60'

30	VfB Stuttgart	2–0	Bayern Munich
	Cacau 23', 25'

31	Bayern Munich	1–2	Hamburger SV
	Pizarro 35'		Van der Vaart 71'; Guerrero 77'

32	Mönchengladbach	1–1	Bayern Munich
	Kluge 52'		Makaay 12'

33	Energie Cottbus	0–3	Bayern Munich
			Makaay 33' (pen.); Van Buyten 35'; Santa Cruz 61'

34	Bayern Munich	5–2	Mainz 05
	Santa Cruz 30'; Scholl 33'; Van Bommel 38'; Karimi 63'; Pizarro 74'		Amri 55'; Feulner 76'

=== DFB-Pokal ===
9 September 2006 First round	FC St. Pauli	1–2 (a.e.t.)	Bayern Munich	Millerntor-Stadion, Hamburg
20:15 CEST	Schultz 31'; Eger (yellow card); Meggle (yellow card); Mazingu-Dinzey (yellow card); Morena (red card) 119'	(Report)	Podolski 46'; Borger 105' (o.g.); Demichelis (yellow card); Lúcio (red card) 91'	Attendance: 19,400 (capacity); Referee: Lutz Wagner (Kriftel)

25 October 2006 Second round	Bayern Munich	1–0	1. FC Kaiserslautern	Allianz Arena, Munich
20:30 (CEST)	Ottl 49'; Lahm (yellow card)	(Report)	Müller (yellow card); Bellinghausen (yellow card)	Attendance: 51,000; Referee: Peter Gagelmann (Bremen)

20 December 2006 Third round	Alemannia Aachen	4–2	Bayern Munich	Tivoli, Aachen
20:30 (CET)	Reghecampf 11', 39'; Ebbers 44'; Schlaudraff 90'; Sichone (yellow card); Lehmann (yellow card); Pinto (yellow card)	(Report)	Podolski 47'; Van Bommel 68'; Schweinsteiger (yellow card); Sagnol (yellow card)	Attendance: 20,800 (capacity); Referee: Herbert Fandel (Kyllburg)

=== Champions League ===
Bayern was qualified for the 2006–07 UEFA Champions League. Their opponents in Group B were Spartak Moscow, Sporting CP and Internazionale.

Bayern was eliminated in the quarter-finals by Milan.

==== Group stage ====
Pos	Team	Pld	W	D	L	GF	GA	GD	Pts	Qualification	BAY	INT	SPM	SPO
1	(Germany) Bayern Munich	6	3	3	0	10	3	+7	12	Advance to knockout stage	—	1–1	4–0	0–0
2	(Italy) Internazionale	6	3	1	2	5	5	0	10	Advance to knockout stage	0–2	—	2–1	1–0
3	(Russia) Spartak Moscow	6	1	2	3	7	11	−4	5	Transfer to UEFA Cup	2–2	0–1	—	1–1
4	(Portugal) Sporting CP	6	1	2	3	3	6	−3	5		0–1	1–0	1–3	—

Source: RSSSF

12 September 2006	Bayern Munich (Germany)	4–0	(Russia) Spartak Moscow	Fußball Arena München, Munich
20:45 (CEST)	Pizarro 48'; Santa Cruz 52'; Schweinsteiger 71'; Salihamidžić 84'; Lúcio (yellow card) 40'	(Report)	Bystrov (yellow card) 28'	Attendance: 63,000; Referee: Alberto Undiano Mallenco (Spain)

27 September 2006	Internazionale (Italy)	0–2	(Germany) Bayern Munich	San Siro, Milan
20:45 (CEST)	Materazzi (yellow card) 54'; Ibrahimović (yellow card) 41' (yellow-red card) 58'; Grosso (red card) 85'	(Report)	Pizarro 81'; Podolski 90+1'; Ottl (yellow card) 35'; Sagnol (yellow card) 40'; Scholl (yellow card) 76'	Attendance: 60,000; Referee: Stephen Bennett (England)

18 October 2006	Sporting CP (Portugal)	0–1	(Germany) Bayern Munich	Estádio José Alvalade, Lisbon
20:45 (CEST)	Tello (yellow card) 45'; Liédson (yellow card) 49'; Veloso (yellow card) 68'	(Report)	Schweinsteiger 19', (yellow card) 25' (yellow-red card) 47'; Ottl (yellow card) 28'; Van Bommel (yellow card) 75'; Dos Santos (yellow card) 84'	Attendance: 37,379; Referee: Terje Hauge (Football Association of Norway)

31 October 2006	Bayern Munich (Germany)	0–0	(Portugal) Sporting CP	Fußball Arena München, Munich
20:45 (CET)	Van Buyten (yellow card) 50'; Demichelis (yellow card) 57'	(Report)	Custódio (yellow card) 80'; Liédson (yellow card) 88'	Attendance: 66,000 (capacity); Referee: Massimo Busacca (Switzerland)

22 November 2006	Spartak Moscow (Russia)	2–2	(Germany) Bayern Munich	Luzhniki Stadium, Moscow
20:45 (CET)	Kalnychenko 16'; Kováč 72'; Mozart (yellow card) 16'; Bystrov (yellow card) 79'	(Report)	Pizarro 22', 39'	Attendance: 25,000; Referee: Grzegorz Gilewski (Poland)

5 December 2006	Bayern Munich (Germany)	1–1	(Italy) Internazionale	Fußball Arena München, Munich
20:45 (CET)	Makaay 62'; Van Bommel (yellow card) 62'	(Report)	Vieira 90+1'; Samuel (yellow card) 68'	Attendance: 66,000 (capacity); Referee: Luis Medina Cantalejo (Spain)

==== First knockout stage ====
20 February 2007	Real Madrid (Spain)	3–2	(Germany) Bayern Munich	Estadio Santiago Bernabéu, Madrid
20:45 (CET)	Raúl 10', 28'; Van Nistelrooy 34'	(Report)	Lúcio 23'; Van Bommel 88'; Demichelis (yellow card) 38'; Schweinsteiger (yellow card) 56'; Hargreaves (yellow card) 60'	Attendance: 80,300; Referee: Frank De Bleeckere, Belgium)

7 March 2007	Bayern Munich (Germany)	2–1	(Spain) Real Madrid	Fußball Arena München, Munich
20:45 (CET)	Makaay 1'; Lúcio 66'; Van Bommel (red card) 82'; Podolski (yellow card) 45+3'	(Report)	Van Nistelrooy 83' (pen.); Ramos (yellow card) 8'; Guti (yellow card) 55'; Diarra (red card) 82'	Attendance: 66,000 (capacity); Referee: Ľuboš Micheľ (Slovakia)

==== Quarter-finals ====
3 April 2007	Milan (Italy)	2–2	(Germany) Bayern Munich	San Siro, Milan
20:45 CEST	Pirlo 40'; Kaká 84' (pen.); Gilardino (yellow card) 53'	(Report)	Van Buyten 78', 90+1'; Salihamidžić (yellow card) 33'; Lúcio (yellow card) 83'	Attendance: 77,700; Referee: Yuri Baskakov (Russian Football Union)

11 April 2007	Bayern Munich (Germany)	0–2	(Italy) Milan	Fußball Arena München, Munich
20:45 CEST	Van Bommel (yellow card) 47'; Salihamidžić (yellow card) 73'	(Report)	Seedorf 27'; Inzaghi 31'	Attendance: 65,000; Referee: Manuel Mejuto González (Royal Spanish Football Federation)

== Statistics ==
=== Appearances ===
No.	Pos	Nat	Player	Total		Bundesliga		DFB-Pokal		Champions League	
No.	Pos	Nat	Player	Apps	Goals	Apps	Goals	Apps	Goals	Apps	Goals
1	GK	(Germany) GER	Oliver Kahn (captain)	44	0	32	0	3	0	9	0
22	GK	(Germany) GER	Michael Rensing	4	0	1	0	2	0	1	0
29	GK	(Germany) GER	Bernd Dreher	1	0	1	0	0	0	0	0
2	DF	(France) FRA	Willy Sagnol	28	1	23	1	3	0	2	0
3	DF	(Brazil) BRA	Lúcio	36	2	25+1	0	2	0	8	2
5	DF	(Belgium) BEL	Daniel Van Buyten	44	5	31	3	3	0	10	2
18	DF	(Germany) GER	Andreas Görlitz	13	0	4+7	0	0	0	0+2	0
21	DF	(Germany) GER	Philipp Lahm	46	1	34	1	3	0	9	0
25	DF	(France) FRA	Valérien Ismaël	1	0	0+1	0	0	0	0	0
30	DF	(Germany) GER	Christian Lell	16	0	8+4	0	0	0	3+1	0
32	DF	(Germany) GER	Mats Hummels	1	0	0+1	0	0	0	0	0
6	DF	(Argentina) ARG	Martín Demichelis	34	3	18+8	3	2	0	3+3	0
7	MF	(Germany) GER	Mehmet Scholl	19	1	1+13	1	1	0	0+4	0
8	MF	(Iran) IRI	Ali Karimi	15	1	7+6	1	0	0	0+2	0
17	MF	(Netherlands) NED	Mark van Bommel	38	4	29	3	1	0	8	1
19	MF	(Paraguay) PAR	Julio dos Santos	7	0	0+4	0	1	0	0+2	0
20	MF	(Bosnia and Herzegovina) BIH	Hasan Salihamidžić	42	5	25+4	4	3	0	7+3	1
23	MF	(England) ENG	Owen Hargreaves	10	0	9	0	1	0	0	0
26	MF	(Germany) GER	Sebastian Deisler	5	0	0+4	0	0	0	0+1	0
31	MF	(Germany) GER	Bastian Schweinsteiger	38	6	26+1	4	3	0	8	2
36	MF	(Germany) GER	Stephan Fürstner	1	0	0+1	0	0	0	0	0
39	MF	(Germany) GER	Andreas Ottl	33	2	23+1	1	2	1	7	0
10	FW	(Netherlands) NED	Roy Makaay	44	18	31+2	16	3	0	8	2
11	FW	(Germany) GER	Lukas Podolski	32	7	11+11	4	3	2	6+1	1
14	FW	(Peru) PER	Claudio Pizarro	45	12	23+10	8	2	0	6+4	4
24	FW	(Paraguay) PAR	Roque Santa Cruz	35	3	12+14	2	2	0	3+4	1
34	FW	(Austria) AUT	Stefan Maierhofer	2	0	0+2	0	0	0	0	0
38	FW	(Cameroon) CMR	Louis Clément Ngwat-Mahop	1	0	0+1	0	0	0	0	0

=== Goals ===
Pos.	Player	BL	CL	Cup	Overall
1	(Netherlands) Roy Makaay	16	0	2	18
2	(Peru) Claudio Pizarro	8	0	4	12
3	(Germany) Lukas Podolski	4	2	1	7
4	(Bosnia and Herzegovina) Hasan Salihamidžić	4	0	1	5
4	(Belgium) Daniel Van Buyten	3	0	2	5

=== Bookings ===
N	Pos.	Nat.	Name	Yellow card	Second yellow card	Red card	Notes
1	GK	(Germany)	Oliver Kahn	4			
2	DF	(France)	Willy Sagnol	10			
3	DF	(Brazil)	Lúcio	3		1	
5	DF	(Belgium)	Daniel Van Buyten	3			
18	DF	(Germany)	Andreas Görlitz	1			
21	DF	(Germany)	Philipp Lahm	4			
30	DF	(Germany)	Christian Lell	2			
6	MF	(Argentina)	Martín Demichelis	10			
7	MF	(Germany)	Mehmet Scholl	1			
17	MF	(Netherlands)	Mark van Bommel	13	1		
19	MF	(Paraguay)	Julio dos Santos	1			
20	MF	(Bosnia and Herzegovina)	Hasan Salihamidžić	7			
23	MF	(England)	Owen Hargreaves	2			
31	MF	(Germany)	Bastian Schweinsteiger	8	1		
39	MF	(Germany)	Andreas Ottl	4			
10	FW	(Netherlands)	Roy Makaay	2			
11	FW	(Germany)	Lukas Podolski	2			
14	FW	(Peru)	Claudio Pizarro	2			
24	FW	(Paraguay)	Roque Santa Cruz	1			

Last updated: 1 February 2010
Source: DFB (1), DFB (2). UEFA
Only competitive matches
(yellow card) = Number of bookings; (second yellow card) = Number of sending offs after a second yellow card; (red card) = Number of sending offs by a direct red card.
