= 2006–07 Arsenal F.C. season =

English football club season

Arsenal F.C.
2006–07 season
- Chairman: Peter Hill-Wood
- Manager: Arsène Wenger
- Stadium: Emirates Stadium
- FA Premier League: 4th
- FA Cup: Fifth round
- League Cup: Runners-up
- UEFA Champions League: Round of 16
- Top goalscorer: League: Robin van Persie (11); All: Robin van Persie (13)
- Highest home attendance: 60,128 (vs. Manchester United, 21 January 2007)
- Lowest home attendance: 56,761 (vs. Blackburn Rovers, 17 February 2007)
Home colours	Away colours	Third colours

The 2006–07 season was Arsenal Football Club's 15th season in the Premier League and their 81st consecutive season in the top flight of English football. It was the first season in which home matches were played at the over-60,000 capacity Emirates Stadium; the club's former ground Highbury was to be redeveloped as a residential development. Arsenal ended their Premier League campaign in fourth, level on points with third-placed Liverpool but with a marginally lower goal difference. In the League Cup, a competition which offered manager Arsène Wenger the chance to play his younger players, Arsenal reached the final but lost to a relatively experienced Chelsea side. The defeat was followed by exits in the FA Cup to Blackburn Rovers and in the UEFA Champions League to PSV Eindhoven.

Twenty-eight players represented Arsenal in four competitions and there were 18 goalscorers. Arsenal's top goalscorer was Robin van Persie, who scored 13 goals in 31 appearances.

== Transfers ==
=== In ===
No.	Pos.	Nat.	Name	Age	EU	Moving from	Type	Transfer window	Ends	Transfer fee	Source
17	DM	(Cameroon)	Alex Song	18	Non-EU	Bastia (France)	Transferred ✓	Summer	Undisclosed	£1M	BBC
7	AM	(Czech Republic)	Tomáš Rosický	25	EU	Borussia Dortmund (Germany)	Transferred ✓	Summer	Undisclosed	Undisclosed	BBC
9	AM	(Brazil)	Júlio Baptista	24	Non-EU	Real Madrid (Spain)	Loan ✓	Summer	May 2007	N/A	BBC
10	CB	(France)	William Gallas	29	EU	Chelsea	Swap ✓	Summer	Undisclosed	Free; Swap	BBC
15	MF	(Brazil)	Denílson	18	Non-EU	São Paulo (Brazil)	Transferred ✓	Summer	Undisclosed	£3.4M	BBC

=== Out ===
No.	Pos.	Nat.	Name	Age	EU	Moving to	Type	Transfer window	Transfer fee	Source
10	SS	(Netherlands)	Dennis Bergkamp	37	EU		Retired ✓			BBC
7	AM	(France)	Robert Pires	32	EU	Villarreal (Spain)	Transferred ✓	Summer	Free	BBC
43	MF	(England)	Ryan Smith	19	EU	Derby County	Transferred ✓	Summer	Undisclosed	BBC
29	MF	(Sweden)	Sebastian Larsson	21	EU	Birmingham City	Loaned out ✓	Summer	N/A	BBC
26	MF	(Denmark)	Nicklas Bendtner	18	EU	Birmingham City	Loaned out ✓	Summer	N/A	BBC
23	CB	(England)	Sol Campbell	31	EU	Portsmouth	Transferred ✓	Summer	Free	BBC
41	CF	(Italy)	Arturo Lupoli	19	EU	Derby County	Loaned out ✓	Summer	N/A	BBC
18	DF	(France)	Pascal Cygan	32	EU	Villarreal (Spain)	Transferred ✓	Summer	£2M	BBC
9	MF	(Spain)	José Antonio Reyes	22	EU	Real Madrid (Spain)	Loaned out ✓	Summer	N/A (Included in Baptista transfer)	BBC
3	LB	(England)	Ashley Cole	25	EU	Chelsea	Transferred ✓	Summer	£5M + Gallas	BBC
45	FW	(Republic of Ireland)	Anthony Stokes	18	EU	Sunderland	Transferred ✓	Winter	£2M	BBC
12	RB	(Cameroon)	Lauren	29	Non-EU	Portsmouth	Transferred ✓	Winter	£0.5M	BBC
17	DM	(Cameroon)	Alex Song	19	Non-EU	Charlton Athletic	Loaned out ✓	Winter	N/A	BBC
29	MF	(Sweden)	Sebastian Larsson	21	EU	Birmingham City	Transferred ✓	Winter	£1M	BBC

Last updated: 2 August 2008
EU = if holds or not a European Union passport; Country: when 2 flags, 1st flag = country that plays for internationally, 2nd flag = country of birth; N = number on jersey; P = Position (for position name, pause mouse pointer on abbreviation); Name = Name on jersey (for more extensive name, pause mouse pointer on name); Age = age on the day of the signing; Moving from = only indicate the club the player was playing before start playing for this club in this season, for the type of the moving see Status column; Moving to = only indicates the club the player is going to play next, for the type of the moving see Status column; Ends = when the player's current contract ends; n/a = Not applicable.

== Club ==
=== Coaching staff ===
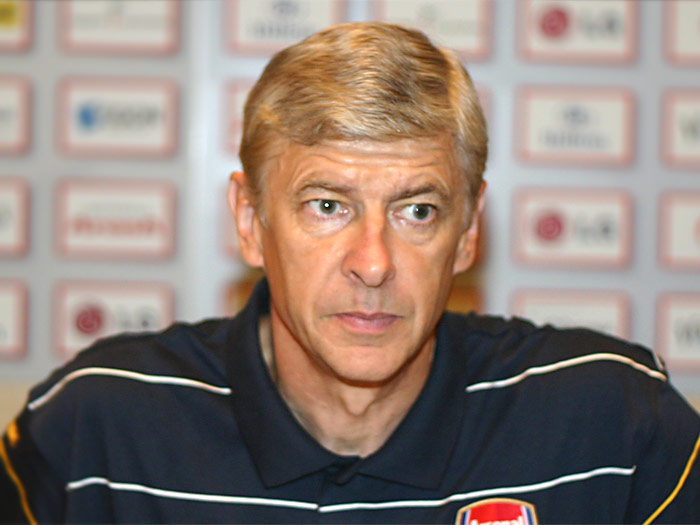
This was Arsène Wenger's 11th season with Arsenal.

Position	Staff
Manager	(France) Arsène Wenger
Assistant manager	(Northern Ireland) Pat Rice
First team coach	(Bosnia and Herzegovina) Boro Primorac
Goalkeeping coach	(Republic of Ireland) Gerry Peyton
Physiotherapist	(England) Gary Lewin
Fitness coach	(England) Tony Colbert
Chief scout	(England) Steve Rowley
Kit manager	(England) Vic Akers (England) Paul Johnson

Last updated: 1 July 2006
Source: Arsenal FC

=== Kit ===
Supplier: Nike / Sponsor: Fly Emirates

Home	Home alt.	Away	Third	Goalkeeper 1	Goalkeeper alt.	Goalkeeper 2	Goalkeeper 3	Goalkeeper Pre-season

=== Kit information ===
All of the new Arsenal kit this season was featured with new sponsor, Fly Emirates. Replaced with previous sponsor, O2.

- Home: The new home kit returned to a solid iconic Arsenal red shirt with white sleeves, white shorts and white socks, the colours Arsenal are well known for, after the last season saw a redcurrant 'anniversary' kit in final season at Highbury. The new features added to the home kit was a red band appearing on the sleeves and socks, while the golden trimmings appeared on the side of the shirt. The home was usually worn with white socks, however red socks were worn in some away games in order to prevent confusion.
- Away: The yellow and dark grey away kit from last season was unchanged, albeit with new sponsor.
- Third: Arsenal's blue 2004–05 away kit was retained as a third kit yet again, albeit with new sponsor. This kit did not end up being used.
- Keeper: The goalkeeper kit were based on Nike's Harlequin template, which was basically a strip split into subtle halves in two tones of one colour. The main kit was green, but the black and yellow kit were available should they be required.

=== Other information ===
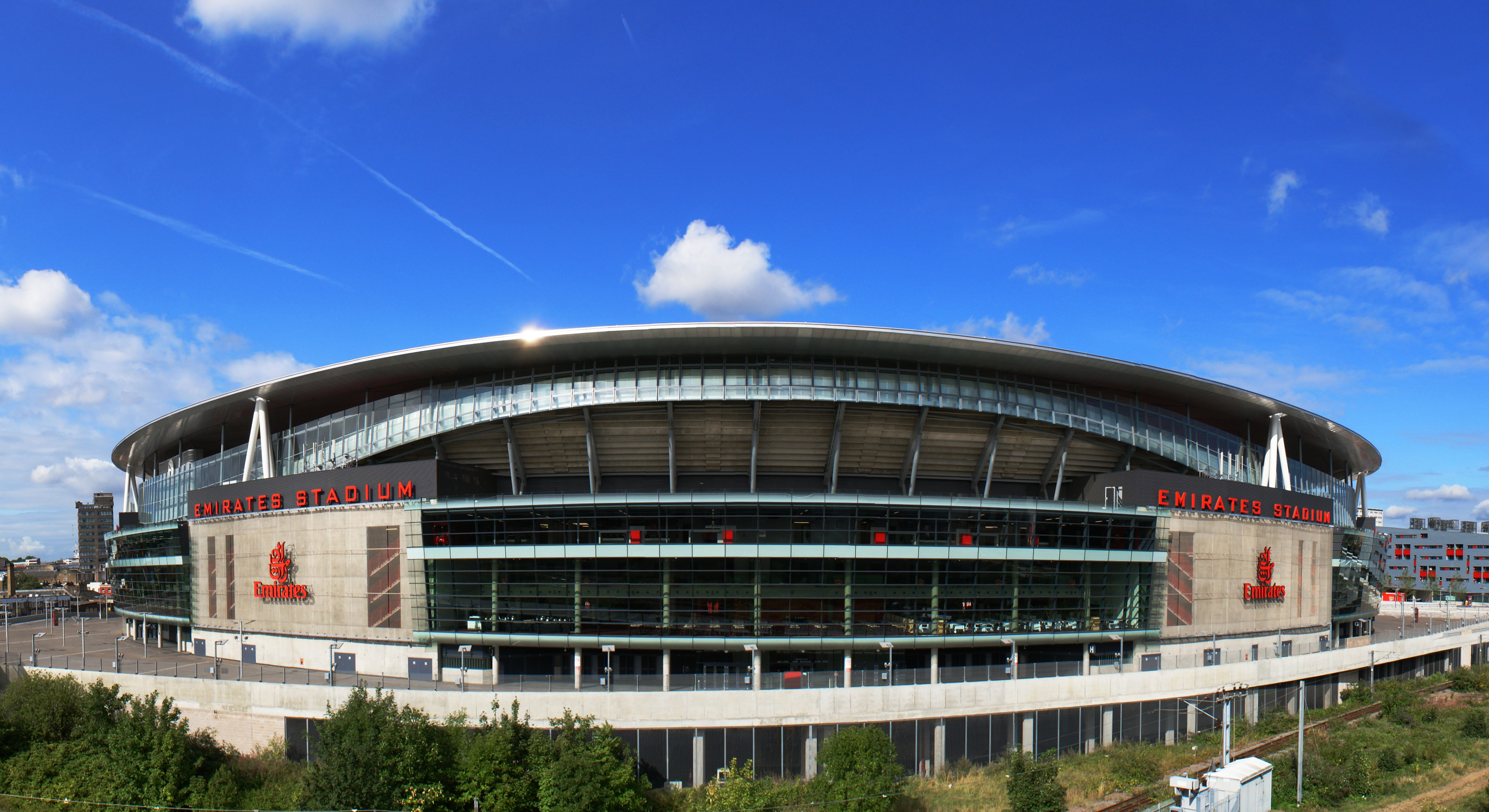
The Emirates Stadium is the new Arsenal stadium and second largest stadium in the Premier League.

Chairman	(England) Peter Hill-Wood
Ground (capacity and dimensions)	Emirates Stadium (60,355 / 114x71 yards)

Updated to match played 2 Aug 2008
Source: Arsenal and Emirates Stadium

== Premier League ==
=== August–October ===
Arsenal's league season began with their first-ever match at the new Emirates Stadium, against an Aston Villa side who had struggled with relegation threats the previous season. However, the Gunners` performance did not match the pre-game expectations; the sides drew 1-1, Gilberto Silva scoring a late equaliser after Olof Mellberg put Villa ahead; a bright spark for Arsenal was youngster Theo Walcott, who had helped create the goal with a fine run after making his debut as a substitute. The Gunners then disappointingly lost 1–0 to Manchester City to a Joey Barton penalty just before the break, having dominated the match and spurned numerous chances.

The Gunners then hosted Middlesbrough in their second league match at the Emirates, and once again were forced to come from behind in a strangely similar game to the Villa one; James Morrison gave Boro the lead, before Thierry Henry opened his account for the season from the penalty spot to salvage a point for Arsenal.

The Gunners finally registed their first win of the season, claiming a magnificent 1–0 victory at Old Trafford against to-be champions Manchester United, thanks to a late Emmanuel Adebayor goal and some heroic defending, including a stunning fingertip save from Jens Lehmann against United striker Ole Gunnar Solskjaer. This was followed by a first-ever league win at the Emirates; second-half goals from William Gallas and Thierry Henry either side of a Phil Jagielka own goal gave the Gunners a comfortable 3–0 victory over Sheffield United. They then were forced to come from behind away to Charlton Athletic; however a Robin van Persie double, including a stunning edge-of-the box flying volley, gave the Gunners a 2–1 victory to close out the month in eighth position. October began with a fine 3–0 win over Watford, Arsenal's second in a row by that scoreline at the Emirates. An own goal from Jordan Stewart and strikes from Henry and Emmanuel Adebayor took the Gunners to fifth position in the league. The Gunners managed to crack the top four for the first time that season thanks to a convincing 4-0 trouncing of Premier League newboys Reading at the Madejski Stadium. Two for Henry, including one from the spot, and further goals for Alexander Hleb and Robin van Persie gave the Gunners a convincing victory. The Gunners then concluded October with more silly dropped points at the Emirates, van Persie's free-kick not enough as the Gunners drew 1–1 with Everton.

=== November–February ===
Overall November was a poor month for Arsenal, with just one win and one draw in the five games played. A late goal from Marlon Harewood saw the Gunners sloppily lose 1–0 at West Ham United, before goals from Kolo Toure, William Gallas and Mathieu Flamini gave the Gunners a stunning 3–0 victory against Liverpool. However, a draw with Newcastle at the Emirates, only salvaged by Thierry Henry's late free-kick, was followed by back to back defeats at Bolton and Fulham by scorelines of 3-1 and 2-1 respectively, with Gilberto Silva scoring at Bolton and Robin van Persie in Craven Cottage. December began with the first-ever north London derby at the Emirates Stadium against Tottenham Hotspur, which was decided ultimately by two controversial penalty calls from referee Graham Poll; both were converted by Gilberto Silva either side of half-time to add to Emmanuel Adebayor's opener as Arsenal won 3–0. Another London derby followed, this time at Stamford Bridge against Premier League title-holders Chelsea, where a hotly-contested derby ended 1-1 after Michael Essien responded to Mathieu Flamini's strike late in the match. The Gunners then claimed a dramatic late win at Wigan thanks to Adebayor to move third in the table, before staging a two-goal comeback to draw 2–2 with Portsmouth at the Emirates with Adebayor and stand-in captain Silva on the scoresheet. The Gunners then concluded the first half of the season with a 6-2 dismantling of Blackburn Rovers at the Emirates, claiming their biggest win at the new venue to date. Shabani Nonda actually put Blackburn in front with a penalty just three minutes in, but goals from Gilberto Silva, Alexander Hleb and a penalty from Adebayor gave Arsenal a 3–1 lead before half an hour was up. Nonda pulled one back for Blackburn with his second in the second half, but three goals in the last eight minutes through a brace from van Persie and a third of the season for Mathieu Flamini sealed a big victory. Van Persie scored a late winner at Watford after Tommy Smith had responded to Gilberto Silva's opener, taking the Gunners up to third in the table. However, they ended the year in fifth after a dramatic 1–0 loss at newly promoted and relegation-doomed Sheffield United, with Blades defender Phil Jagielka filling in goals for half an hour, as Arsenal concluded the year with an embarrassing defeat. Arsenal responded to the loss at Bramall Lane with a thumping win over relegation-doomed Charlton Athletic to start the year-a rare goal for Justin Hoyte, a penalty for Thierry Henry and a brace, including one penalty, for Robin van Persie handed the Gunners a 4–0 win to start the year. Captain Henry was particularly impressive on his return from injury after 34 days, delivering an assist as well as his goal and winning the second penalty. He then netted a fine curling effort and delivered another assist in a 2–0 win at Blackburn Rovers, before a big clash at home to Manchester United-after Wayne Rooney gave United the lead, Henry set up van Persie for an equaliser before heading in a 93rd-minute winner, in what was the club's 200th meeting with United to date. Henry was again the hero, netting a late equaliser at Middlesbrough after Yakubu's penalty had put Boro ahead in a 1–1 draw. An own goal from Fritz Hall and a first Premier League goal for Tomas Rosicky in the last ten minutes earned the Gunners a dramatic 2–1 victory over Wigan, closing out the month in fourth place.

=== March–May ===
March began with a penalty from Gilberto Silva and a first league goal for the Gunners from Julio Baptista giving them a 2–1 win against Reading. This was followed by a narrow 1-0 success at Aston Villa, thanks to an early Abou Diaby strike, as Arsenal rose to third position. They consolidated this place despite performing poorly in a 1–0 defeat at Everton. Returning to Merseyside nearly a fortnight later, Arsenal were crushed 4-1 by Liverpool, who were inspired by Peter Crouch, who netted a "perfect" hat-trick of left foot, right foot and head; William Gallas scored Arsenal's consolation as they slipped to fourth in the table. A string of fine saves from visiting goalkeeper Robert Green, as well as many missed chances, saw the Gunners beaten 1–0 at the Emirates against West Ham United-their first defeat at the venue. Another lacklustre display saw them draw 0–0 at Newcastle before returning to winning ways against Bolton; after falling behind to Nicolas Anelka's goal, Tomas Rosicky and Cesc Fabregas struck as the Gunners turned it around to win it 2–1 against the ten-men Trotters. Fabregas and Rosicky were both again on the scoresheet, alongside Julio Baptista, as they beat Manchester City 3–1 at the Emirates. In a big north London derby at White Hart Lane, Arsenal fell behind half an hour in before turning it around with Kolo Toure and Emmanuel Adebayor; however they were denied a win thanks to a late Jermaine Jenas equaliser. They concluded the month with a league match against struggling Fulham at the Emirates; after Julio Baptista gave the Gunners an early lead, Fulham pegged them back with twelve minutes left before a late strike from Adebayor and a penalty from Gilberto Silva gave the Gunners a 3–1 win. The Gunners began May with a London derby at the Emirates against Chelsea. The champions needed a victory to take their title race with Manchester United to the final day, but a penalty from Gilberto Silva and a red card from Khalid Boulahrouz had them trailing by a goal and a man at the break. Despite eventually drawing the match 1-1, they lost the league to United, whilst Arsenal stayed fourth. The Gunners concluded their season at Portsmouth, drawing 0–0 to finish the season in fourth position.

=== Matches ===
19 August 2006 1	Arsenal	1–1	Aston Villa	London
15:00 BST	Gilberto 84'	Report	Mellberg 53'	Stadium: Emirates Stadium; Attendance: 60,023; Referee: Graham Poll

26 August 2006 2	Manchester City	1–0	Arsenal	Manchester
17:15 BST	Barton 41' (pen.)	Report		Stadium: City of Manchester Stadium; Attendance: 40,699; Referee: Uriah Rennie

9 September 2006 3	Arsenal	1–1	Middlesbrough	London
15:00 BST	Henry 67' (pen.)	Report	Morrison 22'	Stadium: Emirates Stadium; Attendance: 60,007; Referee: Rob Styles

17 September 2006 4	Manchester United	0–1	Arsenal	Manchester
16:00 BST		Report	Adebayor 86'	Stadium: Old Trafford; Attendance: 75,595; Referee: Graham Poll

23 September 2006 5	Arsenal	3–0	Sheffield United	London
15:00 BST	Gallas 65'; Jagielka 69' (o.g.); Henry 80'	Report		Stadium: Emirates Stadium; Attendance: 59,912; Referee: Alan Wiley

30 September 2006 6	Charlton Athletic	1–2	Arsenal	London
15:00 BST	Bent 22'	Report	Van Persie 32', 49'	Stadium: The Valley; Attendance: 26,770; Referee: Mark Clattenburg

14 October 2006 7	Arsenal	3–0	Watford	London
15:00 BST	Stewart 33' (o.g.); Henry 43'; Adebayor 67'	Report		Stadium: Emirates Stadium; Attendance: 60,018; Referee: Howard Webb

22 October 2006 8	Reading	0–4	Arsenal	Reading
16:00		Report	Henry 1', 70' (pen.); Hleb 39'; Van Persie 50'	Stadium: Madejski Stadium; Attendance: 24,004; Referee: Alan Wiley

28 October 2006 9	Arsenal	1–1	Everton	London
15:00 BST	Van Persie 71'	Report	Cahill 11'	Stadium: Emirates Stadium; Attendance: 60,047; Referee: Mike Riley

5 November 2006 10	West Ham United	1–0	Arsenal	London
13:30 GMT	Harewood 89'	Report		Stadium: Upton Park; Attendance: 34,969; Referee: Rob Styles

12 November 2006 11	Arsenal	3–0	Liverpool	London
16:00 GMT	Flamini 41'; Touré 56'; Gallas 80'	Report		Stadium: Emirates Stadium; Attendance: 60,110; Referee: Mark Clattenburg

18 November 2006 12	Arsenal	1–1	Newcastle United	London
15:00 GMT	Henry 70'	Report	Dyer 30'	Stadium: Emirates Stadium; Attendance: 60,058; Referee: Martin Atkinson

25 November 2006 13	Bolton Wanderers	3–1	Arsenal	Bolton
17:15 GMT	Faye 9'; Anelka 45', 76'	Report	Gilberto 45+2'	Stadium: Reebok Stadium; Attendance: 24,409; Referee: Mike Dean

29 November 2006 14	Fulham	2–1	Arsenal	London
19:45 GMT	McBride 6'; Radzinski 19'	Report	Van Persie 36'	Stadium: Craven Cottage; Attendance: 24,510; Referee: Howard Webb

2 December 2006 15	Arsenal	3–0	Tottenham Hotspur	London
12:45 GMT	Adebayor 20'; Gilberto 42' (pen.), 72' (pen.)	Report		Stadium: Emirates Stadium; Attendance: 60,115; Referee: Graham Poll

10 December 2006 16	Chelsea	1–1	Arsenal	London
16:00 GMT	Essien 84'	Report	Flamini 78'	Stadium: Stamford Bridge; Attendance: 41,917; Referee: Alan Wiley

13 December 2006 17	Wigan Athletic	0–1	Arsenal	Wigan
19:45 GMT		Report	Adebayor 88'	Stadium: JJB Stadium; Attendance: 15,311; Referee: Rob Styles

16 December 2006 18	Arsenal	2–2	Portsmouth	London
15:00 GMT	Adebayor 58'; Gilberto 60'	Report	Pamarot 45+2'; Taylor 47'	Stadium: Emirates Stadium; Attendance: 60,037; Referee: Steve Bennett

23 December 2006 19	Arsenal	6–2	Blackburn Rovers	London
15:00 GMT	Gilberto 10'; Hleb 23'; Adebayor 27' (pen.); Van Persie 85', 88'; Flamini 90+3'	Report	Nonda 3' (pen.), 69'	Stadium: Emirates Stadium; Attendance: 59,913; Referee: Howard Webb

26 December 2006 20	Watford	1–2	Arsenal	Watford
17:30 GMT	Smith 23'	Report	Gilberto 19'; Van Persie 83'	Stadium: Vicarage Road; Attendance: 19,750; Referee: Mike Dean

30 December 2006 21	Sheffield United	1–0	Arsenal	Sheffield
17:15 GMT	Nade 41'	Report		Stadium: Bramall Lane; Attendance: 32,086; Referee: Lee Mason

2 January 2007 22	Arsenal	4–0	Charlton Athletic	London
19:45 GMT	Henry 30' (pen.); Hoyte 45'; Van Persie 76' (pen.), 90'	Report	Sankofa (red card) 29'	Stadium: Emirates Stadium; Attendance: 60,057; Referee: Mike Riley

13 January 2007 23	Blackburn Rovers	0–2	Arsenal	Blackburn
17:15 GMT		Report	Gilberto (red card) 13'; Touré 37'; Henry 71'	Stadium: Ewood Park; Attendance: 21,852; Referee: Rob Styles

21 January 2007 24	Arsenal	2–1	Manchester United	London
16:00 GMT	Van Persie 83'; Henry 90+3'	Report	Rooney 53'	Stadium: Emirates Stadium; Attendance: 60,128; Referee: Steve Bennett

3 February 2007 25	Middlesbrough	1–1	Arsenal	Middlesbrough
17:15 GMT	Yakubu 63' (pen.)	Report	Henry 77'	Stadium: Riverside Stadium; Attendance: 31,122; Referee: Mike Riley

11 February 2007 26	Arsenal	2–1	Wigan Athletic	London
16:00 GMT	Hall 81' (o.g.); Rosický 85'	Report	Landzaat 35'	Stadium: Emirates Stadium; Attendance: 60,049; Referee: Phil Dowd

3 March 2007 27	Arsenal	2–1	Reading	London
15:00 GMT	Gilberto 51' (pen.); Baptista 62'; Senderos (yellow card) 90+3'	Report	Kitson (yellow card) 42'; Fàbregas 87' (o.g.)	Stadium: Emirates Stadium; Attendance: 60,132; Referee: Chris Foy

14 March 2007 28	Aston Villa	0–1	Arsenal	Birmingham
19:45 GMT		Report	Diaby 10'	Stadium: Villa Park; Attendance: 39,968; Referee: Martin Atkinson

18 March 2007 29	Everton	1–0	Arsenal	Liverpool
16:00 GMT	Johnson 90+1'	Report		Stadium: Goodison Park; Attendance: 37,162; Referee: Mark Clattenburg

31 March 2007 30	Liverpool	4–1	Arsenal	Liverpool
12:45 GMT	Crouch 4', 35', 81'; Agger 60'	Report	Gallas 73'	Stadium: Anfield; Attendance: 43,958; Referee: Steve Bennett

7 April 2007 31	Arsenal	0–1	West Ham United	London
15:00 BST		Report	Zamora 45+2'	Stadium: Emirates Stadium; Attendance: 60,098; Referee: Graham Poll

9 April 2007 32	Newcastle United	0–0	Arsenal	Newcastle upon Tyne
15:00 BST		Report		Stadium: St James' Park; Attendance: 52,293; Referee: Howard Webb

14 April 2007 33	Arsenal	2–1	Bolton Wanderers	London
15:00 BST	Rosický 31'; Fàbregas 46'	Report	Anelka 11'	Stadium: Emirates Stadium; Attendance: 60,101; Referee: Rob Styles

17 April 2007 34	Arsenal	3–1	Manchester City	London
19:45 BST	Rosický 12'; Fàbregas 73'; Baptista 80'	Report	Beasley 41'	Stadium: Emirates Stadium; Attendance: 59,913; Referee: Mark Halsey

21 April 2007 35	Tottenham Hotspur	2–2	Arsenal	London
12:45 BST	Keane 30'; Jenas 90+5'	Report	Touré 64'; Adebayor 78'	Stadium: White Hart Lane; Attendance: 36,050; Referee: Mike Dean

29 April 2007 36	Arsenal	3–1	Fulham	London
16:00 BST	Baptista 4'; Adebayor 84'; Gilberto 87' (pen.)	Report	Davies 78'	Stadium: Emirates Stadium; Attendance: 60,043; Referee: Mark Clattenburg

6 May 2007 37	Arsenal	1–1	Chelsea	London
16:00 BST	Gilberto 43' (pen.); Adebayor (yellow card) 49'	Report	Mikel (yellow card) 31'; Boulahrouz (red card) 43'; Essien 70', (yellow card) 90+2'	Stadium: Emirates Stadium; Attendance: 60,102; Referee: Alan Wiley

13 May 2007 38	Portsmouth	0–0	Arsenal	Portsmouth
15:00 BST		Report		Stadium: Fratton Park; Attendance: 20,188; Referee: Graham Poll

=== Classification ===
==== Standings ====
Pos	Team	Pld	W	D	L	GF	GA	GD	Pts	Qualification or relegation
2	Chelsea	38	24	11	3	64	24	+40	83	Qualification for the Champions League group stage
3	Liverpool	38	20	8	10	57	27	+30	68	Qualification for the Champions League third qualifying round
4	Arsenal	38	19	11	8	63	35	+28	68	Qualification for the Champions League third qualifying round
5	Tottenham Hotspur	38	17	9	12	57	54	+3	60	Qualification for the UEFA Cup first round (Note: Since both finalists of the FA Cup (Manchester United and Chelsea) and the League Cup winners (Chelsea) were qualified for the Champions League, their UEFA Cup spots were given to the 6th- and 7th-placed Premier League teams.)
6	Everton	38	15	13	10	52	36	+16	58	Qualification for the UEFA Cup first round

Source: Barclays Premier League
Rules for classification: 1) points; 2) goal difference; 3) number of goals scored.

==== Results summary ====
Overall								Home						Away					
Pld	W	D	L	GF	GA	GD	Pts	W	D	L	GF	GA	GD	W	D	L	GF	GA	GD
38	19	11	8	63	35	+28	68	12	6	1	43	16	+27	7	5	7	20	19	+1

Source: Premier League

==== Results by round ====
Round	1	2	3	4	5	6	7	8	9	10	11	12	13	14	15	16	17	18	19	20	21	22	23	24	25	26	27	28	29	30	31	32	33	34	35	36	37	38
Ground	H	A	H	A	H	A	H	A	H	A	H	H	A	A	H	A	A	H	H	A	A	H	A	H	A	H	H	A	A	A	H	A	H	H	A	H	H	A
Result	D	L	D	W	W	W	W	W	D	L	W	D	L	L	W	D	W	D	W	W	L	W	W	W	D	W	W	W	L	L	L	D	W	W	D	W	D	D
Position	9	17	17	11	9	8	5	4	5	5	3	4	6	6	3	3	3	4	4	3	5	4	4	4	4	4	4	3	3	4	4	4	4	4	4	4	4	4

Source: Arsenal F.C.
A = Away; H = Home; W = Win; D = Draw; L = Loss

== UEFA Champions League ==
Having finished fourth in the Premier League the previous season, Arsenal entered the Champions League at the third qualifying round stage, and were duly drawn against Croatians Dinamo Zagreb. In the first leg in Zagreb, the home side held Arsenal off for over an hour before two goals in a minute for Cesc Fabregas and Robin van Persie established a 2–0 lead for Arsenal; Fabregas sealed his brace late on as Arsenal took a convincing lead to London. Despite falling behind to a goal after 12 minutes from future Arsenal striker Eduardo, late goals from Invincible Freddie Ljungberg and Mathieu Flamini gave the Gunners their first win at the Emirates and a 5-1 aggregate victory. Arsenal were drawn in Group G, alongside Portuguese champions Porto, German outfit Hamburg and Russians CSKA Moscow. A stunning second-half goal from Tomas Rosicky sealed three points in Hamburg before goals from Thierry Henry and Alexander Hleb gave them a 2–0 win over Porto. A disappointing set of results against CSKA Moscow followed; Arsenal lost 1–0 in Russia before being held to a goalless draw at the Emirates, however they bounced back with a 3–1 win over Hamburg before sealing top spot in the group through a goalless draw at Porto. As a seeded side, Arsenal got what was considered a favourable round-of-16 draw against Dutch side PSV Eindhoven, but crashed out 2–1 on aggregate, with a 1–1 draw at the Emirates failing to make up for a poor 1–0 defeat in the Netherlands.

=== Third qualifying round ===
8 August 2006 First leg	Dinamo Zagreb (Croatia)	0–3	(England) Arsenal	Zagreb, Croatia
21:05 CET		Report	Fàbregas 63', 79'; Van Persie 64'	Stadium: Stadion Maksimir; Attendance: 28,500; Referee: Kyros Vassaras (Greece)

23 August 2006 Second leg	Arsenal (England)	2–1 (5–1 agg.)	(Croatia) Dinamo Zagreb	London, England
20:05 BST	Ljungberg 77'; Flamini 90+1'	Report	Eduardo 12'	Stadium: Emirates Stadium; Attendance: 58,418; Referee: Bertrand Layec (France)

=== Group stage ===
Pos	Team	Pld	W	D	L	GF	GA	GD	Pts	Qualification
1	(England) Arsenal	6	3	2	1	7	3	+4	11	Advance to knockout stage
2	(Portugal) Porto	6	3	2	1	9	4	+5	11	Advance to knockout stage
3	(Russia) CSKA Moscow	6	2	2	2	4	5	−1	8	Transfer to UEFA Cup
4	(Germany) Hamburger SV	6	1	0	5	7	15	−8	3	

Source: RSSSF

13 September 2006 1	Hamburg (Germany)	1–2	(England) Arsenal	Hamburg, Germany
20:45 CET	Kirschstein (red card); Sanogo 90'	Report	Gilberto 12' (pen.); Rosický 53'	Stadium: Hamburg Arena; Attendance: 51,258; Referee: Peter Frojdfeldt (Sweden)

26 September 2006 2	Arsenal (England)	2–0	(Portugal) Porto	London, England
19:45 BST	Henry 38'; Hleb 48'	Report		Stadium: Emirates Stadium; Attendance: 59,861; Referee: Stefano Farina (Italy)

17 October 2006 3	CSKA Moscow (Russia)	1–0	(England) Arsenal	Moscow, Russia
18:30 CET	Carvalho 24'	Report		Stadium: Lokomotiv Stadium; Attendance: 36,500; Referee: Manuel Mejuto González (Spain)

1 November 2006 4	Arsenal (England)	0–0	(Russia) CSKA Moscow	London, England
19:45 GMT		Report		Stadium: Emirates Stadium; Attendance: 60,003; Referee: Ľuboš Micheľ (Slovakia)

21 November 2006 5	Arsenal (England)	3–1	(Germany) Hamburg	London, England
19:45 GMT	Van Persie 52'; Eboué 83'; Baptista 88'	Report	Van der Vaart 4'	Stadium: Emirates Stadium; Attendance: 59,962; Referee: Claus Bo Larsen (Denmark)

6 December 2006 6	Porto (Portugal)	0–0	(England) Arsenal	Porto, Portugal
20:45 CET		Report		Stadium: Estádio do Dragão; Attendance: 41,500; Referee: Markus Merk (Germany)

=== Knockout phase ===
==== Round of 16 ====
20 February 2007 First leg	PSV Eindhoven (Netherlands)	1–0	(England) Arsenal	Eindhoven, Netherlands
20:45 CET	Méndez 61'	Report		Stadium: Philips Stadion; Attendance: 35,000; Referee: Tom Henning Øvrebø (Norway)

7 March 2007 Second leg	Arsenal (England)	1–1 (1–2 agg.)	(Netherlands) PSV Eindhoven	London, England
19:45 GMT	Alex 58' (o.g.)	Report	Alex 83'	Stadium: Emirates Stadium; Attendance: 60,073; Referee: Alain Hamer (Luxembourg)

== FA Cup ==
Arsenal began their FA Cup campaign in the third round, where they faced a tough draw in the form of fellow Premier League side Liverpool at Anfield. However, a first-half brace from Tomas Rosicky and a late strike from Thierry Henry gave the Gunners an excellent 3–1 win, shortly before a 6-3 League Cup win at the same venue. The Gunners drew Premier League team Bolton Wanderers in the fourth round, and were hard-put to it against their bogey team, drawing 1–1 at the Emirates before being forced into extra-time at the Reebok. However, an Emmanuel Adebayor double and a goal from Freddie Ljungberg eventually gave them a 3–1 win. The Gunners however were eliminated in the next round; after a goalless draw at the Emirates, Arsenal lost their fifth-round replay 1–0 to Blackburn Rovers.

6 January 2007 R3	Liverpool	1–3	Arsenal	Liverpool
17:15	Alonso (yellow card) 25'; Kuyt 71'	Report	Senderos (yellow card) 31'; Clichy (yellow card) 34'; Rosický 37', 45'; Eboué (yellow card) 65'; Henry 84'	Stadium: Anfield; Attendance: 43,619; Referee: Steve Bennett

28 January 2007 R4	Arsenal	1–1	Bolton Wanderers	London
16:00 GMT	Touré 78'	Report	Nolan 50'	Stadium: Emirates Stadium; Attendance: 59,778; Referee: Mike Dean

14 February 2007 R4 Replay	Bolton Wanderers	1–3 (a.e.t.)	Arsenal	Bolton
20:05 GMT	Méïté 90'	Report	Adebayor 13', 120'; Ljungberg 108'	Stadium: Reebok Stadium; Attendance: 21,088; Referee: Chris Foy

17 February 2007 R5	Arsenal	0–0	Blackburn Rovers	London
12:30 GMT		Report		Stadium: Emirates Stadium; Attendance: 56,761; Referee: Martin Atkinson

28 February 2007 R5 Replay	Blackburn Rovers	1–0	Arsenal	Blackburn
20:00 GMT	McCarthy 87'	Report		Stadium: Ewood Park; Attendance: 18,882; Referee: Graham Poll

== League Cup ==
Arsenal entered the competition in the third round and faced West Bromwich Albion at The Hawthorns, where striker Aliadière scored twice to secure a 2–0 victory for the visitors. They then travelled to Goodison Park in the fourth round to play Everton. Arsenal won the match 0–1 courtesy of a late Adebayor goal, which came from a corner. For much of the game Everton played with a man disadvantage as striker James McFadden was sent off in the 19th minute for dissent.

Closing stages of Arsenal's second leg match against Tottenham Hotspur at the Emirates Stadium.

Liverpool were Arsenal's opponent in the fifth round. The match, scheduled on 19 December 2006 at Anfield, was postponed by referee Martin Atkinson because of heavy fog. Atkinson's decision infuriated the managers of both clubs, with Rafael Benítez commenting: "There were a lot of people looking forward to the game and it's really difficult to explain." The tie was rescheduled for 9 January 2007 and on the night Arsenal took the lead when Aliadière scored in the 27th minute. Robbie Fowler equalised for Liverpool six minutes later. Later, two goals from Baptista and goal from Alex Song put Arsenal 4–1 ahead at half time. In the second half, Baptista completed his hat-trick; although Steven Gerrard and Sami Hyypiä scored to close the scoreline gap for Liverpool, Baptista added his fourth goal of the match in the 84th minute. The final score was 6–3, Liverpool's heaviest defeat at Anfield in 76 years. In his match report for The Guardian, Taylor praised Arsenal's reserve team and summarised, "The difference between the two teams was immense. Arsenal played with flair and purpose; Liverpool were dishevelled and short of leadership."

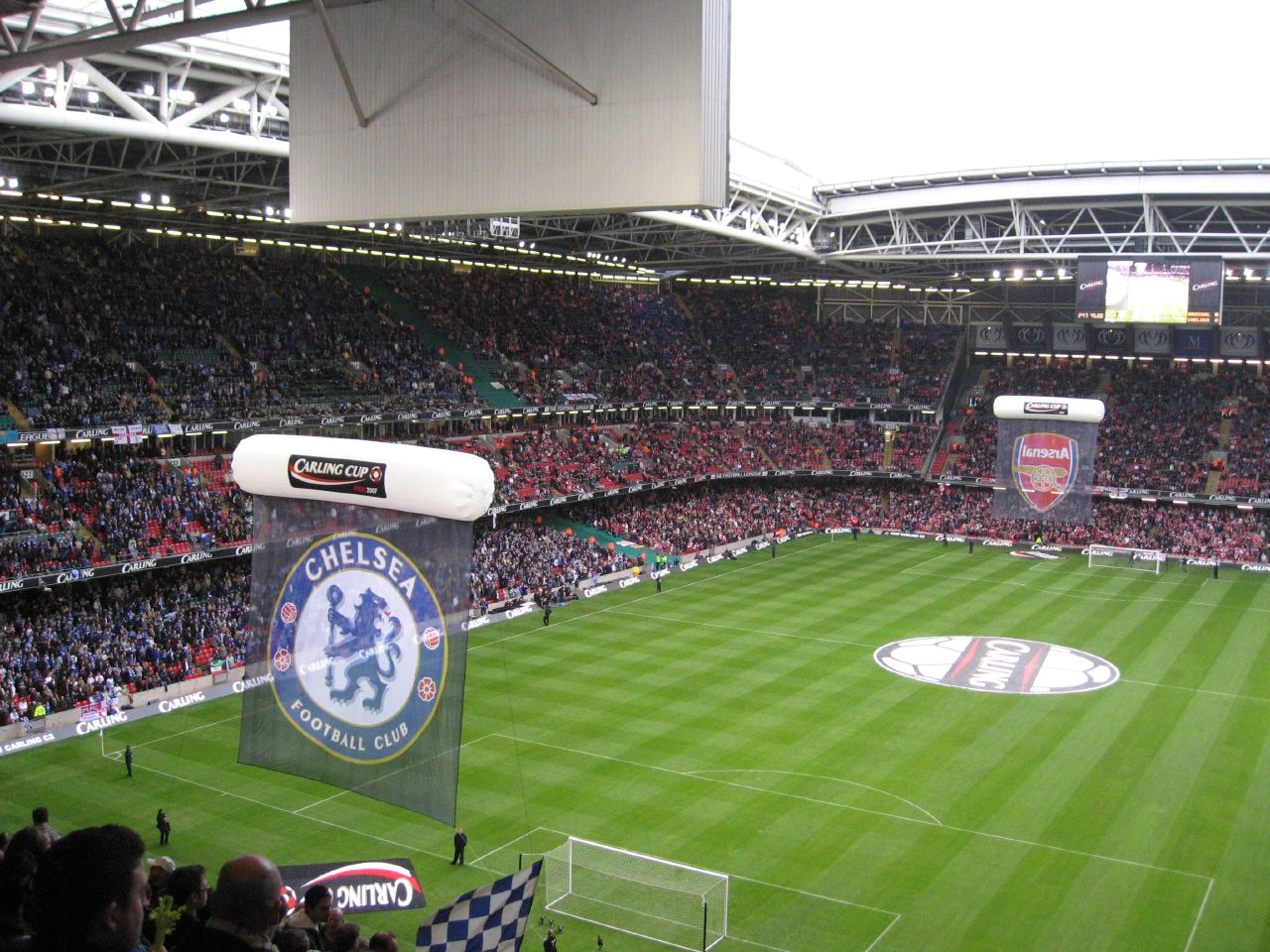
Pre-match presentation

Tottenham Hotspur faced Arsenal in the semi-final which was played over two legs. A goal from Dimitar Berbatov gave Tottenham the lead in the 12th minute and they extended their advantage after Baptista inadvertently kicked the ball into his own goal. Baptista, however, made amends in the second half, scoring twice in the space of 13 minutes to level the score at 2–2. The second leg at the Emirates Stadium saw Arsenal dominate proceedings, but only took the lead in the 77th minute when Adebayor scored. Mido equalised for Tottenham, which took the match into extra time because of the away goals rule. Aliadière's goal in the 105th minute restored Arsenal's lead and an own goal scored by Pascal Chimbonda ensured the home team progressed to the final, winning 3–1 after extra time and 5–3 on aggregate.

Arsenal played Chelsea in the final at the Millennium Stadium on 25 February 2007. Wenger continued his policy of naming a young team, which took the lead in the 12th minute when Walcott converted his chance. Chelsea striker Didier Drogba equalised and scored in the 84th minute to earn his side victory. A fracas occurred between the Arsenal and Chelsea players occurred during stoppage time, resulting in Touré and Adebayor getting shown a red card each. Wenger later apologised for his players' conduct, but was charged £2,500 for accusing the linesman of lying in his account of Adebayor's actions. Both clubs were fined £100,000 each by The Football Association for their inability to control their players and Eboué was retrospectively charged with violent conduct for striking Wayne Bridge.

24 October 2006 Third round	West Bromwich Albion	0–2	Arsenal	West Bromwich
		Report	Aliadière 34', 49' (pen.)	Stadium: The Hawthorns; Attendance: 21,566; Referee: Martin Atkinson

8 November 2006 Fourth round	Everton	0–1	Arsenal	Liverpool
		Report	Adebayor 85'	Stadium: Goodison Park; Attendance: 31,045; Referee: Graham Poll

9 January 2007 Fifth round	Liverpool	3–6	Arsenal	Liverpool
	Fowler 33'; Gerrard 68'; Hyypiä 80'	Report	Aliadière 27'; Baptista 40', 45+2', 60', 84'; Song 45'	Stadium: Anfield; Attendance: 42,614; Referee: Martin Atkinson

24 January 2007 Semi-final, first leg	Tottenham Hotspur	2–2	Arsenal	London
	Berbatov 12'; Baptista 20' (o.g.)	Report	Baptista 64', 77'	Stadium: White Hart Lane; Attendance: 35,485; Referee: Graham Poll

31 January 2007 Semi-final, second leg	Arsenal	3–1 (a.e.t.) (5–3 agg.)	Tottenham Hotspur	London
	Adebayor 77'; Aliadière 105'; Chimbonda 113' (o.g.)	Report	Mido 85'	Stadium: Emirates Stadium; Attendance: 59,872; Referee: Alan Wiley

25 February 2007 Final	Arsenal	1–2	Chelsea	Cardiff
15:00 GMT	Walcott 12'	Report	Drogba 20', 84'	Stadium: Millennium Stadium; Attendance: 70,073; Referee: Howard Webb

== Squad statistics ==
No.	Pos	Nat	Player	Total		Premier League		FA Cup		League Cup		Champions League	
No.	Pos	Nat	Player	Apps	Goals	Apps	Goals	Apps	Goals	Apps	Goals	Apps	Goals
1	GK	(Germany) GER	Jens Lehmann	44	0	36	0	0	0	0	0	8	0
2	MF	(France) FRA	Abou Diaby	18	1	9+3	1	1	0	3+1	0	0+1	0
4	MF	(Spain) ESP	Cesc Fàbregas	54	4	34+4	2	2	0	3+1	0	10	2
5	DF	(Ivory Coast) CIV	Kolo Touré	53	4	35	3	4	1	4	0	10	0
6	DF	(Switzerland) SUI	Philippe Senderos	25	0	9+5	0	4	0	5	0	2	0
7	MF	(Czech Republic) CZE	Tomáš Rosický	37	6	22+4	3	3+1	2	0+1	0	6	1
8	MF	(Sweden) SWE	Freddie Ljungberg	26	2	16+2	0	2+1	1	0	0	4+1	1
9	AM	(Brazil) BRA	Júlio Baptista	35	10	11+13	3	2+2	0	3	6	1+3	1
10	DF	(France) FRA	William Gallas	29	3	21	3	2	0	0	0	6	0
11	FW	(Netherlands) NED	Robin van Persie	31	13	17+5	11	1	0	0	0	7+1	2
12	DF	(Cameroon) CMR	Lauren	0	0	0	0	0	0	0	0	0	0
13	AM	(Belarus) BLR	Alexander Hleb	48	3	27+6	2	3	0	0+2	0	10	1
14	FW	(France) FRA	Thierry Henry	27	12	16+1	10	3	1	0	0	5+2	1
15	MF	(Brazil) BRA	Denílson	19	0	4+6	0	2	0	6	0	1	0
16	MF	(France) FRA	Mathieu Flamini	32	4	9+11	3	3	0	2+1	0	3+3	1
17	DM	(Cameroon) CMR	Alex Song	6	1	1+1	0	0	0	3	1	0+1	0
19	MF	(Brazil) BRA	Gilberto Silva	47	11	34	10	3	0	1	0	8+1	1
20	DF	(Switzerland) SUI	Johan Djourou	30	0	18+3	0	1	0	3	0	5	0
21	GK	(Estonia) EST	Mart Poom	2	0	1	0	0	0	0+1	0	0	0
22	DF	(France) FRA	Gaël Clichy	40	0	26+1	0	3+2	0	1+1	0	5+1	0
24	GK	(Spain) ESP	Manuel Almunia	14	0	1	0	5	0	6	0	2	0
25	FW	(Togo) TOG	Emmanuel Adebayor	44	12	21+8	8	2+1	2	3+1	2	6+2	0
27	DF	(Ivory Coast) CIV	Emmanuel Eboué	35	1	23+1	0	2	0	1+2	0	6	1
30	FW	(France) FRA	Jérémie Aliadière	23	4	4+7	0	2+2	0	6	4	0+2	0
31	DF	(England) ENG	Justin Hoyte	36	1	18+4	1	2+2	0	4	0	5+1	0
32	FW	(England) ENG	Theo Walcott	32	1	5+11	0	2+2	0	6	1	0+6	0
33	DF	(England) ENG	Matthew Connolly	2	0	0	0	0	0	1+1	0	0	0
43	MF	(England) ENG	Mark Randall	2	0	0	0	0	0	0+2	0	0	0
45	DF	(France) FRA	Armand Traoré	7	0	0	0	1	0	5+1	0	0	0

== See also ==
- 2006–07 in English football
- List of Arsenal F.C. seasons
