= 2006–07 UEFA Champions League group stage =

International football competition

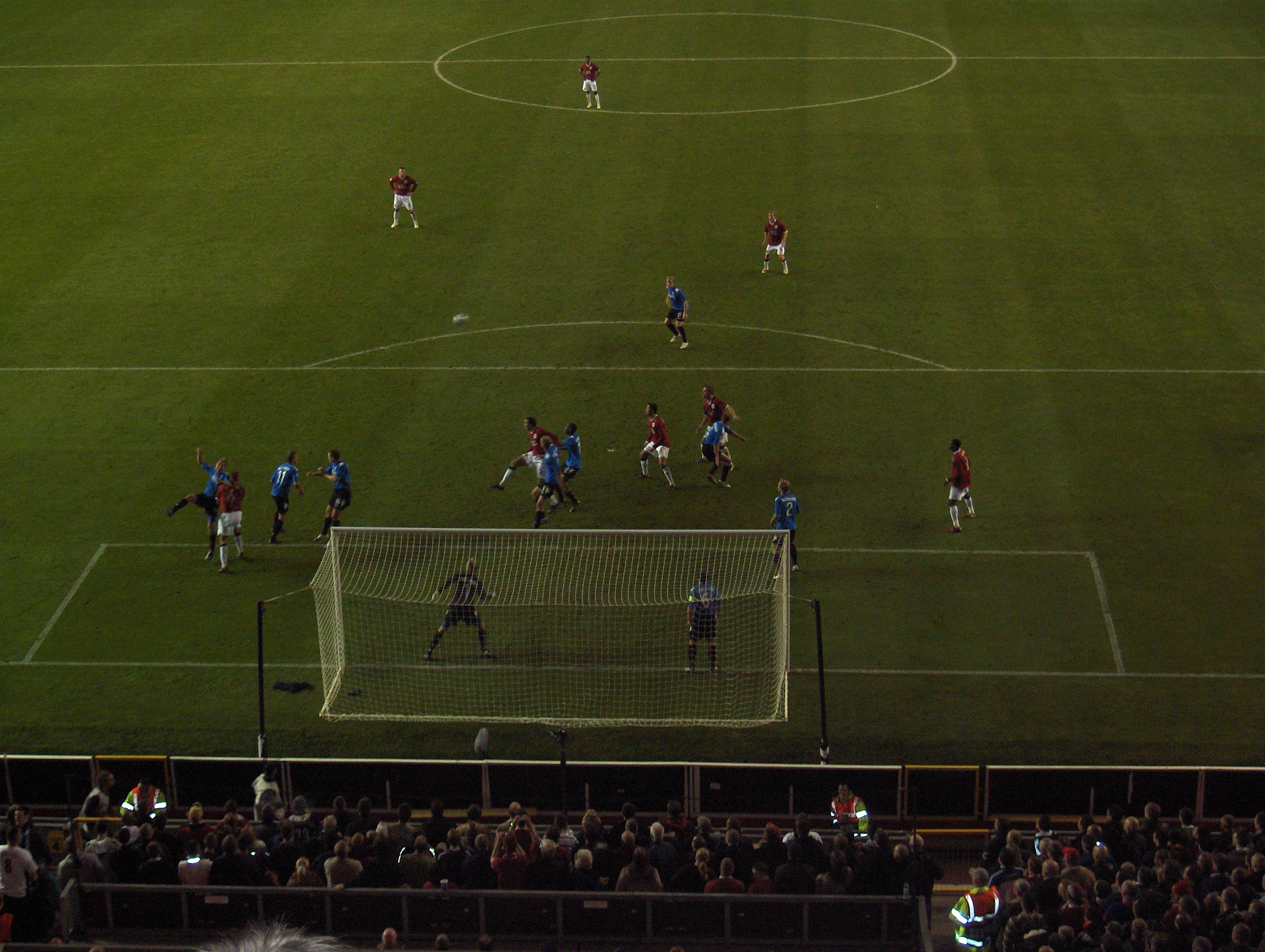
Manchester United vs Copenhagen at Old Trafford in Group F

The 2006–07 UEFA Champions League group stage matches took place between 12 September and 6 December 2006.

All of the Pot 1 and Pot 2 draw seeds advanced, the first time this had occurred since a format of 32 teams and 16 progressing was introduced in 1999–2000.

== Teams ==
Group winners and runners-up advanced to the first knockout round
Third-placed teams entered the UEFA Cup at the round of 32

Pot 1
Team	Notes	Coeff.
(Spain) Barcelona		127.006
(Italy) Milan		129.020
(Spain) Real Madrid		120.006
(Italy) Internazionale		112.020
(England) Liverpool		105.950
(England) Arsenal		101.950
(England) Manchester United		100.950
(Spain) Valencia		95.006

Pot 2
Team	Notes	Coeff.
(France) Lyon		89.757
(Portugal) Porto		87.533
(Netherlands) PSV Eindhoven		81.640
(Germany) Bayern Munich		80.960
(England) Chelsea		79.950
(Italy) Roma		76.020
(Scotland) Celtic		60.023
(France) Lille		54.757

Pot 3
Team	Notes	Coeff.
(Portugal) Sporting CP		54.533
(Portugal) Benfica		51.533
(France) Bordeaux		47.757
(Romania) Steaua București		46.381
(Germany) Werder Bremen		43.960
(Greece) Olympiacos		43.587
(Russia) CSKA Moscow		42.504
(Greece) AEK Athens		39.587

Pot 4
Team	Notes	Coeff.
(Belgium) Anderlecht		38.981
(Ukraine) Dynamo Kyiv		36.777
(Bulgaria) Levski Sofia		35.016
(Ukraine) Shakhtar Donetsk		33.777
(Turkey) Galatasaray		33.634
(Germany) Hamburger SV		30.960
(Russia) Spartak Moscow		21.504
(Denmark) Copenhagen		16.593

Notes

1. ^{TH} Champions League title holders (automatic top seed of pot 1)
2. ^{Q3} Winners of the third qualifying round

== Groups ==
Times are CET/CEST, (Note: CET (UTC+1) for matches from 31 October 2006, and CEST (UTC+2) for matches to 18 October 2006.) as listed by UEFA (local times, if different, are in parentheses).

=== Group A ===
Pos	Team	Pld	W	D	L	GF	GA	GD	Pts	Qualification	CHE	BAR	BRM	LSO
1	(England) Chelsea	6	4	1	1	10	4	+6	13	Advance to knockout stage	—	1–0	2–0	2–0
2	(Spain) Barcelona	6	3	2	1	12	4	+8	11	Advance to knockout stage	2–2	—	2–0	5–0
3	(Germany) Werder Bremen	6	3	1	2	7	5	+2	10	Transfer to UEFA Cup	1–0	1–1	—	2–0
4	(Bulgaria) Levski Sofia	6	0	0	6	1	17	−16	0		1–3	0–2	0–3	—

Source: RSSSF
12 September 2006
20:45 (19:45 UTC+1)

Chelsea (England)	2–0	(Germany) Werder Bremen
Essien 24'; Ballack 68' (pen.)	Report

Stamford Bridge, London
Attendance: 32,135
Referee: Kyros Vassaras (Greece)
12 September 2006
20:45

Barcelona (Spain)	5–0	(Bulgaria) Levski Sofia
Iniesta 7'; Giuly 39'; Puyol 49'; Eto'o 58'; Ronaldinho 90+3'	Report

Camp Nou, Barcelona
Attendance: 62,839
Referee: Konrad Plautz (Austria)

27 September 2006
20:45 (21:45 UTC+3)

Levski Sofia (Bulgaria)	1–3	(England) Chelsea
Ognyanov 89'	Report	Drogba 39', 52', 68'

Vasil Levski National Stadium, Sofia
Attendance: 42,226
Referee: Laurent Duhamel (France)
27 September 2006
20:45

Werder Bremen (Germany)	1–1	(Spain) Barcelona
Puyol 56' (o.g.)	Report	Messi 89'

Weserstadion, Bremen
Attendance: 37,000
Referee: Roberto Rosetti (Italy)

18 October 2006
20:45

Werder Bremen (Germany)	2–0	(Bulgaria) Levski Sofia
Naldo 45+1'; Diego 73'	Report

Weserstadion, Bremen
Attendance: 36,246
Referee: Paul Allaerts (Belgium)
18 October 2006
20:45 (19:45 UTC+1)

Chelsea (England)	1–0	(Spain) Barcelona
Drogba 47'	Report

Stamford Bridge, London
Attendance: 40,599
Referee: Frank De Bleeckere (Belgium)

31 October 2006
20:45 (21:45 UTC+2)

Levski Sofia (Bulgaria)	0–3	(Germany) Werder Bremen
	Report	Mihaylov 33' (o.g.); Baumann 35'; Frings 37'

Vasil Levski National Stadium, Sofia
Attendance: 25,862
Referee: Matteo Trefoloni (Italy)
31 October 2006
20:45

Barcelona (Spain)	2–2	(England) Chelsea
Deco 3'; Guðjohnsen 58'	Report	Lampard 52'; Drogba 90+3'

Camp Nou, Barcelona
Attendance: 90,166
Referee: Stefano Farina (Italy)

22 November 2006
20:45

Werder Bremen (Germany)	1–0	(England) Chelsea
Mertesacker 27'	Report

Weserstadion, Bremen
Attendance: 36,908
Referee: Ľuboš Micheľ (Slovakia)
22 November 2006
20:45 (21:45 UTC+2)

Levski Sofia (Bulgaria)	0–2	(Spain) Barcelona
	Report	Giuly 5'; Iniesta 65'

Vasil Levski National Stadium, Sofia
Attendance: 41,423
Referee: Yuri Baskakov (Russia)

5 December 2006
20:45 (19:45 UTC+0)

Chelsea (England)	2–0	(Bulgaria) Levski Sofia
Shevchenko 27'; Wright-Phillips 83'	Report

Stamford Bridge, London
Attendance: 33,358
Referee: Alain Hamer (Luxembourg)
5 December 2006
20:45

Barcelona (Spain)	2–0	(Germany) Werder Bremen
Ronaldinho 13'; Guðjohnsen 18'	Report

Camp Nou, Barcelona
Attendance: 95,824
Referee: Massimo Busacca (Switzerland)

=== Group B ===
Pos	Team	Pld	W	D	L	GF	GA	GD	Pts	Qualification	BAY	INT	SPM	SPO
1	(Germany) Bayern Munich	6	3	3	0	10	3	+7	12	Advance to knockout stage	—	1–1	4–0	0–0
2	(Italy) Internazionale	6	3	1	2	5	5	0	10	Advance to knockout stage	0–2	—	2–1	1–0
3	(Russia) Spartak Moscow	6	1	2	3	7	11	−4	5	Transfer to UEFA Cup	2–2	0–1	—	1–1
4	(Portugal) Sporting CP	6	1	2	3	3	6	−3	5		0–1	1–0	1–3	—

Source: RSSSF
12 September 2006
20:45 (19:45 UTC+1)

Sporting CP (Portugal)	1–0	(Italy) Internazionale
Caneira 64'	Report

Estádio José Alvalade, Lisbon
Attendance: 30,222
Referee: Alain Hamer (Luxembourg)
12 September 2006
20:45

Bayern Munich (Germany)	4–0	(Russia) Spartak Moscow
Pizarro 48'; Santa Cruz 52'; Schweinsteiger 71'; Salihamidžić 84'	Report

Allianz Arena, Munich
Attendance: 63,000
Referee: Alberto Undiano Mallenco (Spain)

27 September 2006
18:30 (20:30 UTC+4)

Spartak Moscow (Russia)	1–1	(Portugal) Sporting CP
Boyarintsev 5'	Report	Nani 59'

Luzhniki Stadium, Moscow
Attendance: 36,000
Referee: Martin Hansson (Sweden)
27 September 2006
20:45

Internazionale (Italy)	0–2	(Germany) Bayern Munich
	Report	Pizarro 81'; Podolski 90+1'

San Siro, Milan
Attendance: 36,460
Referee: Steve Bennett (England)

18 October 2006
20:45

Internazionale (Italy)	2–1	(Russia) Spartak Moscow
Cruz 1', 9'	Report	Pavlyuchenko 54'

San Siro, Milan
Attendance: 21,945
Referee: Bertrand Layec (France)
18 October 2006
20:45 (19:45 UTC+1)

Sporting CP (Portugal)	0–1	(Germany) Bayern Munich
	Report	Schweinsteiger 19'

Estádio José Alvalade, Lisbon
Attendance: 37,379
Referee: Terje Hauge (Norway)

31 October 2006
18:30 (20:30 UTC+3)

Spartak Moscow (Russia)	0–1	(Italy) Internazionale
	Report	Cruz 2'

Luzhniki Stadium, Moscow
Attendance: 45,000
Referee: Claus Bo Larsen (Denmark)
31 October 2006
20:45

Bayern Munich (Germany)	0–0	(Portugal) Sporting CP
	Report

Allianz Arena, Munich
Attendance: 65,000
Referee: Massimo Busacca (Switzerland)

22 November 2006
18:30 (20:30 UTC+3)

Spartak Moscow (Russia)	2–2	(Germany) Bayern Munich
Kalynychenko 16'; Kováč 72'	Report	Pizarro 22', 39'

Luzhniki Stadium, Moscow
Attendance: 25,000
Referee: Grzegorz Gilewski (Poland)
22 November 2006
20:45

Internazionale (Italy)	1–0	(Portugal) Sporting CP
Crespo 36'	Report

San Siro, Milan
Attendance: 36,935
Referee: Frank De Bleeckere (Belgium)

5 December 2006
20:45 (19:45 UTC+0)

Sporting CP (Portugal)	1–3	(Russia) Spartak Moscow
Bueno 31'	Report	Pavlyuchenko 7'; Kalynychenko 16'; Boyarintsev 89'

Estádio José Alvalade, Lisbon
Attendance: 18,000
Referee: Nicolai Vollquartz (Denmark)
5 December 2006
20:45

Bayern Munich (Germany)	1–1	(Italy) Internazionale
Makaay 62'	Report	Vieira 90+1'

Allianz Arena, Munich
Attendance: 66,000
Referee: Luis Medina Cantalejo (Spain)

=== Group C ===
Pos	Team	Pld	W	D	L	GF	GA	GD	Pts	Qualification	LIV	PSV	BOR	GAL
1	(England) Liverpool	6	4	1	1	11	5	+6	13	Advance to knockout stage	—	2–0	3–0	3–2
2	(Netherlands) PSV Eindhoven	6	3	1	2	6	6	0	10	Advance to knockout stage	0–0	—	1–3	2–0
3	(France) Bordeaux	6	2	1	3	6	7	−1	7	Transfer to UEFA Cup	0–1	0–1	—	3–1
4	(Turkey) Galatasaray	6	1	1	4	7	12	−5	4		3–2	1–2	0–0	—

Source: RSSSF
12 September 2006
20:45 (21:45 UTC+3)

Galatasaray (Turkey)	0–0	(France) Bordeaux
	Report

Atatürk Olympic Stadium, Istanbul
Attendance: 71,230
Referee: Roberto Rosetti (Italy)
12 September 2006
20:45

PSV Eindhoven (Netherlands)	0–0	(England) Liverpool
	Report

Philips Stadion, Eindhoven
Attendance: 32,000
Referee: Massimo Busacca (Switzerland)

27 September 2006
20:45 (19:45 UTC+1)

Liverpool (England)	3–2	(Turkey) Galatasaray
Crouch 9', 52'; L. García 14'	Report	Ümit Karan 59', 65'

Anfield, Liverpool
Attendance: 41,976
Referee: Luis Medina Cantalejo (Spain)
27 September 2006
20:45

Bordeaux (France)	0–1	(Netherlands) PSV Eindhoven
	Report	Väyrynen 65'

Stade Chaban-Delmas, Bordeaux
Attendance: 23,587
Referee: Olegário Benquerença (Portugal)

18 October 2006
20:45

Bordeaux (France)	0–1	(England) Liverpool
	Report	Crouch 58'

Stade Chaban-Delmas, Bordeaux
Attendance: 31,471
Referee: Tom Henning Øvrebø (Norway)
18 October 2006
20:45 (21:45 UTC+3)

Galatasaray (Turkey)	1–2	(Netherlands) PSV Eindhoven
Ilić 19'	Report	Kromkamp 59'; Koné 72'

Atatürk Olympic Stadium, Istanbul
Attendance: 51,714
Referee: Yuri Baskakov (Russia)

31 October 2006
20:45 (19:45 UTC+0)

Liverpool (England)	3–0	(France) Bordeaux
L. García 23', 76'; Gerrard 71'	Report

Anfield, Liverpool
Attendance: 41,978
Referee: Markus Merk (Germany)
31 October 2006
20:45

PSV Eindhoven (Netherlands)	2–0	(Turkey) Galatasaray
Simons 59'; Koné 84'	Report

Philips Stadion, Eindhoven
Attendance: 34,500
Referee: Martin Hansson (Sweden)

22 November 2006
20:45

Bordeaux (France)	3–1	(Turkey) Galatasaray
Alonso 22'; Laslandes 47'; Faubert 50'	Report	Inamoto 73'

Stade Chaban-Delmas, Bordeaux
Attendance: 22,834
Referee: Vladimír Hriňák (Slovakia)
22 November 2006
20:45 (19:45 UTC+0)

Liverpool (England)	2–0	(Netherlands) PSV Eindhoven
Gerrard 65'; Crouch 89'	Report

Anfield, Liverpool
Attendance: 41,948
Referee: Domenico Messina (Italy)

5 December 2006
20:45 (21:45 UTC+2)

Galatasaray (Turkey)	3–2	(England) Liverpool
Necati 24'; Okan 28'; Ilić 79'	Report	Fowler 22', 90'

Atatürk Olympic Stadium, Istanbul
Attendance: 21,481
Referee: Olegário Benquerença (Portugal)
5 December 2006
20:45

PSV Eindhoven (Netherlands)	1–3	(France) Bordeaux
Alex 87'	Report	Faubert 7'; Dalmat 25'; Darcheville 37'

Philips Stadion, Eindhoven
Attendance: 30,000
Referee: Manuel Mejuto González (Spain)

=== Group D ===
Pos	Team	Pld	W	D	L	GF	GA	GD	Pts	Qualification	VAL	ROM	SHK	OLY
1	(Spain) Valencia	6	4	1	1	12	6	+6	13	Advance to knockout stage	—	2–1	2–0	2–0
2	(Italy) Roma	6	3	1	2	8	4	+4	10	Advance to knockout stage	1–0	—	4–0	1–1
3	(Ukraine) Shakhtar Donetsk	6	1	3	2	6	11	−5	6	Transfer to UEFA Cup	2–2	1–0	—	2–2
4	(Greece) Olympiacos	6	0	3	3	6	11	−5	3		2–4	0–1	1–1	—

Source: RSSSF
12 September 2006
20:45 (21:45 UTC+3)

Olympiacos (Greece)	2–4	(Spain) Valencia
Konstantinou 24'; Castillo 66'	Report	Morientes 34', 39', 90'; Albiol 85'

Karaiskakis Stadium, Piraeus
Attendance: 31,490
Referee: Terje Hauge (Norway)
12 September 2006
20:45

Roma (Italy)	4–0	(Ukraine) Shakhtar Donetsk
Taddei 67'; Totti 76'; De Rossi 79'; Pizarro 89'	Report

Stadio Olimpico, Rome
Attendance: 34,035
Referee: Bertrand Layec (France)

27 September 2006
20:45 (21:45 UTC+3)

Shakhtar Donetsk (Ukraine)	2–2	(Greece) Olympiacos
Matuzalém 34'; Marica 70'	Report	Konstantinou 24'; Castillo 68'

RSC Olimpiyskiy, Donetsk
Attendance: 25,500
Referee: Eric Braamhaar (Netherlands)
27 September 2006
20:45

Valencia (Spain)	2–1	(Italy) Roma
Angulo 13'; Villa 29'	Report	Totti 18' (pen.)

Mestalla Stadium, Valencia
Attendance: 40,593
Referee: Herbert Fandel (Germany)

18 October 2006
20:45

Valencia (Spain)	2–0	(Ukraine) Shakhtar Donetsk
Villa 31', 45'	Report

Mestalla Stadium, Valencia
Attendance: 33,540
Referee: Mike Riley (England)
18 October 2006
20:45 (21:45 UTC+3)

Olympiacos (Greece)	0–1	(Italy) Roma
	Report	Perrotta 76'

Karaiskakis Stadium, Piraeus
Attendance: 31,009
Referee: Graham Poll (England)

31 October 2006
20:45 (21:45 UTC+2)

Shakhtar Donetsk (Ukraine)	2–2	(Spain) Valencia
Jádson 3'; Fernandinho 28'	Report	Morientes 18'; Ayala 68'

RSC Olimpiyskiy, Donetsk
Attendance: 25,800
Referee: Peter Frøjdfeldt (Sweden)
31 October 2006
20:45

Roma (Italy)	1–1	(Greece) Olympiacos
Totti 66'	Report	Júlio César 19'

Stadio Olimpico, Rome
Attendance: 28,828
Referee: Olegário Benquerença (Portugal)

22 November 2006
20:45

Valencia (Spain)	2–0	(Greece) Olympiacos
Angulo 45'; Morientes 46'	Report

Mestalla Stadium, Valencia
Attendance: 33,407
Referee: Laurent Duhamel (France)
22 November 2006
20:45 (21:45 UTC+2)

Shakhtar Donetsk (Ukraine)	1–0	(Italy) Roma
Marica 61'	Report

RSC Olimpiyskiy, Donetsk
Attendance: 23,900
Referee: Wolfgang Stark (Germany)

5 December 2006
20:45 (21:45 UTC+2)

Olympiacos (Greece)	1–1	(Ukraine) Shakhtar Donetsk
Castillo 54'	Report	Matuzalém 27'

Karaiskakis Stadium, Piraeus
Attendance: 30,805
Referee: Steve Bennett (England)
5 December 2006
20:45

Roma (Italy)	1–0	(Spain) Valencia
Panucci 13'	Report

Stadio Olimpico, Rome
Attendance: 38,898
Referee: Konrad Plautz (Austria)

=== Group E ===
Pos	Team	Pld	W	D	L	GF	GA	GD	Pts	Qualification	LYO	RMA	STE	DKV
1	(France) Lyon	6	4	2	0	12	3	+9	14	Advance to knockout stage	—	2–0	1–1	1–0
2	(Spain) Real Madrid	6	3	2	1	14	8	+6	11	Advance to knockout stage	2–2	—	1–0	5–1
3	(Romania) Steaua București	6	1	2	3	7	11	−4	5	Transfer to UEFA Cup	0–3	1–4	—	1–1
4	(Ukraine) Dynamo Kyiv	6	0	2	4	5	16	−11	2		0–3	2–2	1–4	—

Source: RSSSF
13 September 2006
20:45 (21:45 UTC+3)

Dynamo Kyiv (Ukraine)	1–4	(Romania) Steaua București
Rebrov 16'	Report	Ghionea 3'; Badea 24'; Dică 43', 79'

NSC Olimpiyskiy, Kyiv
Attendance: 49,500
Referee: Paul Allaerts (Belgium)
13 September 2006
20:45

Lyon (France)	2–0	(Spain) Real Madrid
Fred 11'; Tiago 31'	Report

Stade de Gerland, Lyon
Attendance: 40,013
Referee: Wolfgang Stark (Germany)

26 September 2006
20:45

Real Madrid (Spain)	5–1	(Ukraine) Dynamo Kyiv
Van Nistelrooy 20', 70' (pen.); Raúl 27', 61'; Reyes 45+1'	Report	Milevskyi 47'

Santiago Bernabéu, Madrid
Attendance: 68,105
Referee: Graham Poll (England)
26 September 2006
20:45 (21:45 UTC+3)

Steaua București (Romania)	0–3	(France) Lyon
	Report	Fred 43'; Tiago 55'; Benzema 89'

Stadionul Steaua, Bucharest
Attendance: 25,169
Referee: Howard Webb (England)

17 October 2006
20:45 (21:45 UTC+3)

Steaua București (Romania)	1–4	(Spain) Real Madrid
Badea 64'	Report	Ramos 9'; Raúl 34'; Robinho 56'; Van Nistelrooy 76'

Stadionul Steaua, Bucharest
Attendance: 24,123
Referee: Roberto Rosetti (Italy)
17 October 2006
20:45 (21:45 UTC+3)

Dynamo Kyiv (Ukraine)	0–3	(France) Lyon
	Report	Juninho 31'; Källström 38'; Malouda 51'

NSC Olimpiyskiy, Kyiv
Attendance: 35,500
Referee: Domenico Messina (Italy)

1 November 2006
20:45

Real Madrid (Spain)	1–0	(Romania) Steaua București
Nicoliță 70' (o.g.)	Report

Santiago Bernabéu, Madrid
Attendance: 69,105
Referee: Konrad Plautz (Austria)
1 November 2006
20:45

Lyon (France)	1–0	(Ukraine) Dynamo Kyiv
Benzema 14'	Report

Stade de Gerland, Lyon
Attendance: 40,520
Referee: Pieter Vink (Netherlands)

21 November 2006
20:45 (21:45 UTC+2)

Steaua București (Romania)	1–1	(Ukraine) Dynamo Kyiv
Dică 69'	Report	Cernat 29'

Stadionul Steaua, Bucharest
Attendance: 23,172
Referee: Jaroslav Jára (Czech Republic)
21 November 2006
20:45

Real Madrid (Spain)	2–2	(France) Lyon
Diarra 39'; Van Nistelrooy 83'	Report	Carew 11'; Malouda 31'

Santiago Bernabéu, Madrid
Attendance: 69,906
Referee: Terje Hauge (Norway)

6 December 2006
20:45 (21:45 UTC+2)

Dynamo Kyiv (Ukraine)	2–2	(Spain) Real Madrid
Shatskikh 13', 27'	Report	Ronaldo 86', 88' (pen.)

NSC Olimpiyskiy, Kyiv
Attendance: 33,000
Referee: Mike Riley (England)
6 December 2006
20:45

Lyon (France)	1–1	(Romania) Steaua București
Diarra 12'	Report	Dică 2'

Stade de Gerland, Lyon
Attendance: 39,351
Referee: Darko Ceferin (Slovenia)

=== Group F ===
Pos	Team	Pld	W	D	L	GF	GA	GD	Pts	Qualification	MUN	CEL	BEN	CPH
1	(England) Manchester United	6	4	0	2	10	5	+5	12	Advance to knockout stage	—	3–2	3–1	3–0
2	(Scotland) Celtic	6	3	0	3	8	9	−1	9	Advance to knockout stage	1–0	—	3–0	1–0
3	(Portugal) Benfica	6	2	1	3	7	8	−1	7	Transfer to UEFA Cup	0–1	3–0	—	3–1
4	(Denmark) Copenhagen	6	2	1	3	5	8	−3	7		1–0	3–1	0–0	—

Source: RSSSF
13 September 2006
20:45 (19:45 UTC+1)

Manchester United (England)	3–2	(Scotland) Celtic
Saha 30' (pen.), 40'; Solskjær 47'	Report	Vennegoor of Hesselink 21'; Nakamura 43'

Old Trafford, Manchester
Attendance: 74,031
Referee: Ľuboš Micheľ (Slovakia)
13 September 2006
20:45

Copenhagen (Denmark)	0–0	(Portugal) Benfica
	Report

Parken Stadium, Copenhagen
Attendance: 40,085
Referee: Yuri Baskakov (Russia)

26 September 2006
20:45 (19:45 UTC+1)

Benfica (Portugal)	0–1	(England) Manchester United
	Report	Saha 60'

Estádio da Luz, Lisbon
Attendance: 53,000
Referee: Frank De Bleeckere (Belgium)
26 September 2006
20:45 (19:45 UTC+1)

Celtic (Scotland)	1–0	(Denmark) Copenhagen
Miller 30' (pen.)	Report

Celtic Park, Glasgow
Attendance: 57,598
Referee: Florian Meyer (Germany)

17 October 2006
20:45 (19:45 UTC+1)

Celtic (Scotland)	3–0	(Portugal) Benfica
Miller 56', 66'; Pearson 90'	Report

Celtic Park, Glasgow
Attendance: 58,313
Referee: Eric Braamhaar (Netherlands)
17 October 2006
20:45 (19:45 UTC+1)

Manchester United (England)	3–0	(Denmark) Copenhagen
Scholes 39'; O'Shea 46'; Richardson 83'	Report

Old Trafford, Manchester
Attendance: 72,020
Referee: Jan Wegereef (Netherlands)

1 November 2006
20:45 (19:45 UTC+0)

Benfica (Portugal)	3–0	(Scotland) Celtic
Caldwell 10' (o.g.); Nuno Gomes 22'; Karyaka 76'	Report

Estádio da Luz, Lisbon
Attendance: 47,574
Referee: Kyros Vassaras (Greece)
1 November 2006
20:45

Copenhagen (Denmark)	1–0	(England) Manchester United
Allbäck 73'	Report

Parken Stadium, Copenhagen
Attendance: 40,308
Referee: Wolfgang Stark (Germany)

21 November 2006
20:45 (19:45 UTC+0)

Celtic (Scotland)	1–0	(England) Manchester United
Nakamura 81'	Report

Celtic Park, Glasgow
Attendance: 60,632
Referee: Manuel Mejuto González (Spain)
21 November 2006
20:45 (19:45 UTC+0)

Benfica (Portugal)	3–1	(Denmark) Copenhagen
Léo 14'; Miccoli 16', 37'	Report	Allbäck 89'

Estádio da Luz, Lisbon
Attendance: 37,199
Referee: Roberto Rosetti (Italy)

6 December 2006
20:45 (19:45 UTC+0)

Manchester United (England)	3–1	(Portugal) Benfica
Vidić 45+1'; Giggs 61'; Saha 75'	Report	Nélson 27'

Old Trafford, Manchester
Attendance: 74,955
Referee: Herbert Fandel (Germany)
6 December 2006
20:45

Copenhagen (Denmark)	3–1	(Scotland) Celtic
Hutchinson 2'; Grønkjær 27'; Allbäck 57'	Report	Jarošík 75'

Parken Stadium, Copenhagen
Attendance: 38,647
Referee: Bertrand Layec (France)

=== Group G ===
Pos	Team	Pld	W	D	L	GF	GA	GD	Pts	Qualification	ARS	POR	CSKA	HAM
1	(England) Arsenal	6	3	2	1	7	3	+4	11	Advance to knockout stage	—	2–0	0–0	3–1
2	(Portugal) Porto	6	3	2	1	9	4	+5	11	Advance to knockout stage	0–0	—	0–0	4–1
3	(Russia) CSKA Moscow	6	2	2	2	4	5	−1	8	Transfer to UEFA Cup	1–0	0–2	—	1–0
4	(Germany) Hamburger SV	6	1	0	5	7	15	−8	3		1–2	1–3	3–2	—

Source: RSSSF
13 September 2006
20:45 (19:45 UTC+1)

Porto (Portugal)	0–0	(Russia) CSKA Moscow
	Report

Estádio do Dragão, Porto
Attendance: 37,123
Referee: Tom Henning Øvrebø (Norway)
13 September 2006
20:45

Hamburger SV (Germany)	1–2	(England) Arsenal
Sanogo 90'	Report	Gilberto 12' (pen.); Rosický 53'

Volksparkstadion, Hamburg
Attendance: 50,389
Referee: Peter Fröjdfeldt (Sweden)

26 September 2006
18:30 (20:30 UTC+4)

CSKA Moscow (Russia)	1–0	(Germany) Hamburger SV
Dudu 59'	Report

Lokomotiv Stadium, Moscow
Attendance: 23,000
Referee: Jan Wegereef (Netherlands)
26 September 2006
20:45 (19:45 UTC+1)

Arsenal (England)	2–0	(Portugal) Porto
Henry 38'; Hleb 48'	Report

Emirates Stadium, London
Attendance: 59,861
Referee: Stefano Farina (Italy)

17 October 2006
18:30 (20:30 UTC+4)

CSKA Moscow (Russia)	1–0	(England) Arsenal
Carvalho 24'	Report

Lokomotiv Stadium, Moscow
Attendance: 28,000
Referee: Manuel Mejuto González (Spain)
17 October 2006
20:45 (19:45 UTC+1)

Porto (Portugal)	4–1	(Germany) Hamburger SV
López 14', 81'; González 48' (pen.); Postiga 69'	Report	Trochowski 89'

Estádio do Dragão, Porto
Attendance: 31,109
Referee: Alain Hamer (Luxembourg)

1 November 2006
20:45 (19:45 UTC+0)

Arsenal (England)	0–0	(Russia) CSKA Moscow
	Report

Emirates Stadium, London
Attendance: 60,003
Referee: Ľuboš Micheľ (Slovakia)
1 November 2006
20:45

Hamburger SV (Germany)	1–3	(Portugal) Porto
Van der Vaart 62'	Report	González 44'; López 61'; Moraes 87'

Volksparkstadion, Hamburg
Attendance: 51,000
Referee: Laurent Duhamel (France)

21 November 2006
18:30 (20:30 UTC+3)

CSKA Moscow (Russia)	0–2	(Portugal) Porto
	Report	Quaresma 2'; González 61'

Lokomotiv Stadium, Moscow
Attendance: 21,853
Referee: Kyros Vassaras (Greece)
21 November 2006
20:45 (19:45 UTC+0)

Arsenal (England)	3–1	(Germany) Hamburger SV
Van Persie 52'; Eboué 83'; Baptista 88'	Report	Van der Vaart 4'

Emirates Stadium, London
Attendance: 59,962
Referee: Claus Bo Larsen (Denmark)

6 December 2006
20:45 (19:45 UTC+0)

Porto (Portugal)	0–0	(England) Arsenal
	Report

Estádio do Dragão, Porto
Attendance: 45,609
Referee: Markus Merk (Germany)
6 December 2006
20:45

Hamburger SV (Germany)	3–2	(Russia) CSKA Moscow
Berisha 28'; Van der Vaart 84'; Sanogo 90'	Report	Olić 23' (pen.); Zhirkov 65'

Volksparkstadion, Hamburg
Attendance: 49,649
Referee: Stefano Farina (Italy)

=== Group H ===
Pos	Team	Pld	W	D	L	GF	GA	GD	Pts	Qualification	MIL	LIL	AEK	AND
1	(Italy) Milan	6	3	1	2	8	4	+4	10	Advance to knockout stage	—	0–2	3–0	4–1
2	(France) Lille	6	2	3	1	8	5	+3	9	Advance to knockout stage	0–0	—	3–1	2–2
3	(Greece) AEK Athens	6	2	2	2	6	9	−3	8	Transfer to UEFA Cup	1–0	1–0	—	1–1
4	(Belgium) Anderlecht	6	0	4	2	7	11	−4	4		0–1	1–1	2–2	—

Source: RSSSF
13 September 2006
20:45

Anderlecht (Belgium)	1–1	(France) Lille
Pareja 41'	Report	Fauvergue 80'

Constant Vanden Stock, Brussels
Attendance: 21,071
Referee: Stuart Dougal (Scotland)
13 September 2006
20:45

Milan (Italy)	3–0	(Greece) AEK Athens
Inzaghi 17'; Gourcuff 41'; Kaká 77' (pen.)	Report

San Siro, Milan
Attendance: 31,836
Referee: Mike Riley (England)

26 September 2006
20:45 (21:45 UTC+3)

AEK Athens (Greece)	1–1	(Belgium) Anderlecht
Júlio César 28'	Report	Frutos 25'

Olympic Stadium, Athens
Attendance: 38,982
Referee: Claus Bo Larsen (Denmark)
26 September 2006
20:45

Lille (France)	0–0	(Italy) Milan
	Report

Stade Félix Bollaert, Lens
Attendance: 33,302
Referee: Manuel Mejuto González (Spain)

17 October 2006
20:45

Lille (France)	3–1	(Greece) AEK Athens
Robail 64'; Gygax 82'; Makoun 90+1'	Report	Ivić 68'

Stade Félix Bollaert, Lens
Attendance: 32,145
Referee: Florian Meyer (Germany)
17 October 2006
20:45

Anderlecht (Belgium)	0–1	(Italy) Milan
	Report	Kaká 58'

Constant Vanden Stock, Brussels
Attendance: 20,129
Referee: Luis Medina Cantalejo (Spain)

1 November 2006
20:45 (21:45 UTC+2)

AEK Athens (Greece)	1–0	(France) Lille
Lyberopoulos 74'	Report

Olympic Stadium, Athens
Attendance: 14,373
Referee: Steve Bennett (England)
1 November 2006
20:45

Milan (Italy)	4–1	(Belgium) Anderlecht
Kaká 7' (pen.), 22', 56'; Gilardino 88'	Report	Juhász 61'

San Siro, Milan
Attendance: 37,768
Referee: Herbert Fandel (Germany)

21 November 2006
20:45

Lille (France)	2–2	(Belgium) Anderlecht
Odemwingie 28'; Fauvergue 47'	Report	Mpenza 38', 48'

Stade Félix Bollaert, Lens
Attendance: 40,001
Referee: Tom Henning Øvrebø (Norway)
21 November 2006
20:45 (21:45 UTC+2)

AEK Athens (Greece)	1–0	(Italy) Milan
Júlio César 32'	Report

Olympic Stadium, Athens
Attendance: 56,203
Referee: Eric Braamhaar (Netherlands)

6 December 2006
20:45

Anderlecht (Belgium)	2–2	(Greece) AEK Athens
Vanden Borre 38'; Frutos 63'	Report	Lakis 75'; Cirillo 81'

Constant Vanden Stock, Brussels
Attendance: 21,845
Referee: Peter Fröjdfeldt (Sweden)
6 December 2006
20:45

Milan (Italy)	0–2	(France) Lille
	Report	Odemwingie 7'; Keïta 67'

San Siro, Milan
Attendance: 27,067
Referee: Graham Poll (England)
