= Hasan Salihamidžić =

Bosnian footballer and executive (born 1977)

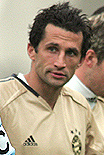
- Salihamidžić with Bayern Munich in 2006

Personal information
- Full name: Hasan Salihamidžić
- Date of birth: 1 January 1977 (age 49)
- Place of birth: Jablanica, SR Bosnia and Herzegovina, SFR Yugoslavia
- Height: 1.75 m (5 ft 9 in)
- Positions: Wide midfielder; full-back

Youth career
- 1987–1991: Turbina Jablanica
- 1991–1992: Velež Mostar
- 1992–1994: Hamburger SV

Senior career*
Years	Team	Apps	(Gls)
1995–1998	Hamburger SV	72	(19)
1998–2007	Bayern Munich	234	(31)
2007–2011	Juventus	61	(7)
2011–2012	VfL Wolfsburg	15	(3)
Total		382	(60)

International career
1996	Bosnia and Herzegovina U21	1	(0)
1996–2006	Bosnia and Herzegovina	42	(6)
- * Club domestic league appearances and goals

Hasan Salihamidžić (Bosnian pronunciation: [xǎsan salixǎmidʒitɕ]; born 1 January 1977), nicknamed Brazzo (Bosnian: Braco, pronounced [brǎːtso], "Little Bro"), is a Bosnian former professional footballer who last served as sporting director of Bundesliga club Bayern Munich. After starting his club career with German side Hamburger SV, he made a name for himself while playing for Bayern Munich for nine seasons with whom he won the Bundesliga title six times, DFB-Pokal title four times, the 2000–01 UEFA Champions League and the 2001 Intercontinental Cup. He also played for Italian club Juventus for four seasons.

He earned 42 caps and scored six goals for the Bosnia and Herzegovina national team. He is regarded by many as one of the most successful Bosnian football players.

Following the end of his one-year contract with VfL Wolfsburg in 2012, Salihamidžić retired from professional football. He then worked for Sky Deutschland, RTL and ZDF, before re-joining Bayern Munich as sporting director in 2017.

== Early life ==
Salihamidžić's father Ahmed and mother Šefika gave him the nickname "Braco", meaning "little brother" in Bosnian, since Hasan has an older sister, hence his current nickname "Brazzo". He finished elementary school and played for local club Turbina Jablanica. Then, Salihamidžić moved to Velež Mostar where he stayed until 1992. That year, Salihamidžić was called up to the Yugoslavia under-16 team, for a match against the CIS under-16 team in Belgrade.

== Club career ==
=== Hamburger SV ===
In November 1992, Salihamidžić moved to Hamburg, Germany, with the assistance of Ahmed Halilhodžić (cousin of football coach Vahid Halilhodžić), who was also a Jablanica native and had emigrated to Germany. Through Ahmed Halilhodžić's help, Salihamidžić joined the youth team of Bundesliga side Hamburger SV. He remained within the club's youth system for three seasons before being promoted to the senior squad. In his first season with the seniors, Salihamidžić made nine appearances, scoring two league goals. The following season, Salihamidžić became an integral part of the squad as he would make 37 appearances and score an impressive seven goals between Europe and the league. He would go on to make 31 league appearances, scoring ten goals during the 1997–98 season, which would be his last for the club before his high-profile transfer to Bundesliga giants Bayern Munich.

=== Bayern Munich ===
Salihamidžić's transfer to Bayern Munich was completed during the 1998 summer transfer window, for an undisclosed fee. In his first season with his new club, 1998–99, Salihamidžić was instantly inserted into the club's starting line-up and made an impressive 43 appearances in all competitions, scoring five goals. During his first season, he came on as a substitute in the 89th minute of the 1999 UEFA Champions League Final against Manchester United.

Salihamidžić would make an additional 46 appearances with three more goals in his second season for the Munich giants, in 1999–2000. His third season proved very successful as well, as he would score six goals in 46 appearances. Between 2001 and 2003, however, Salihamidžić lacked in appearances, mostly due to injury; he made just 50 appearances between both seasons in all competitions.

For the 2003–04 season, the Bosnian international worked his way back into the starting line-up for the entire season, making 47 appearances and scoring five goals, also tallying 43 appearances and five goals the following season.

Salihamidžić was limited to just 29 appearances for the 2005–06 season, but made 42 seasonal appearances in his final season with the club, in which he also scored five goals. One of Salihamidžić's most memorable plays in 2006–07 was in the Champions League round of 16 second leg against Real Madrid, where he dispossessed Roberto Carlos and fed the pass to Roy Makaay, who beat goalkeeper Iker Casillas and set the record for the fastest goal in tournament history, at 11 seconds after kickoff. This helped Bayern overcome a 3–2 loss from the first leg to level the tie at 2–1 and advance on the away goals rule.

As he spent many years being so loved in Munich and his children are from the city, Salihamidžić settled there when his playing career was over.

=== Juventus ===
On 15 January 2007, Salihamidžić signed a four-year pre-deal with Juventus. He joined them the following June after his contract with Bayern had expired. In his first season, under coach Claudio Ranieri, Salihamidžić was a regular starter, albeit with injury lay-offs, and made 30 official appearances for his new club, scoring an impressive five goals which included two in a 3–2 victory against Milan on 12 April 2008. His second and third season with the club, however, proved to be less successful as he suffered from several injury lay-offs.

In the 2010–11 season, new coach Luigi Delneri excluded Salihamidžić from the team's plans. Along with Fabio Grosso, Salihamidžić was the only healthy first-team player that was excluded from the 25-men 2010–11 UEFA Europa League squad. Salihamidžić was released from Juventus when his contract expired in June 2011.

=== VfL Wolfsburg ===
On 4 July 2011, Salihamidžić moved to VfL Wolfsburg on a one-year contract. On 9 July 2011, in a friendly game against local team Bismark, Salihamidžić's left arm was broken in a challenge with another player.

== International career ==
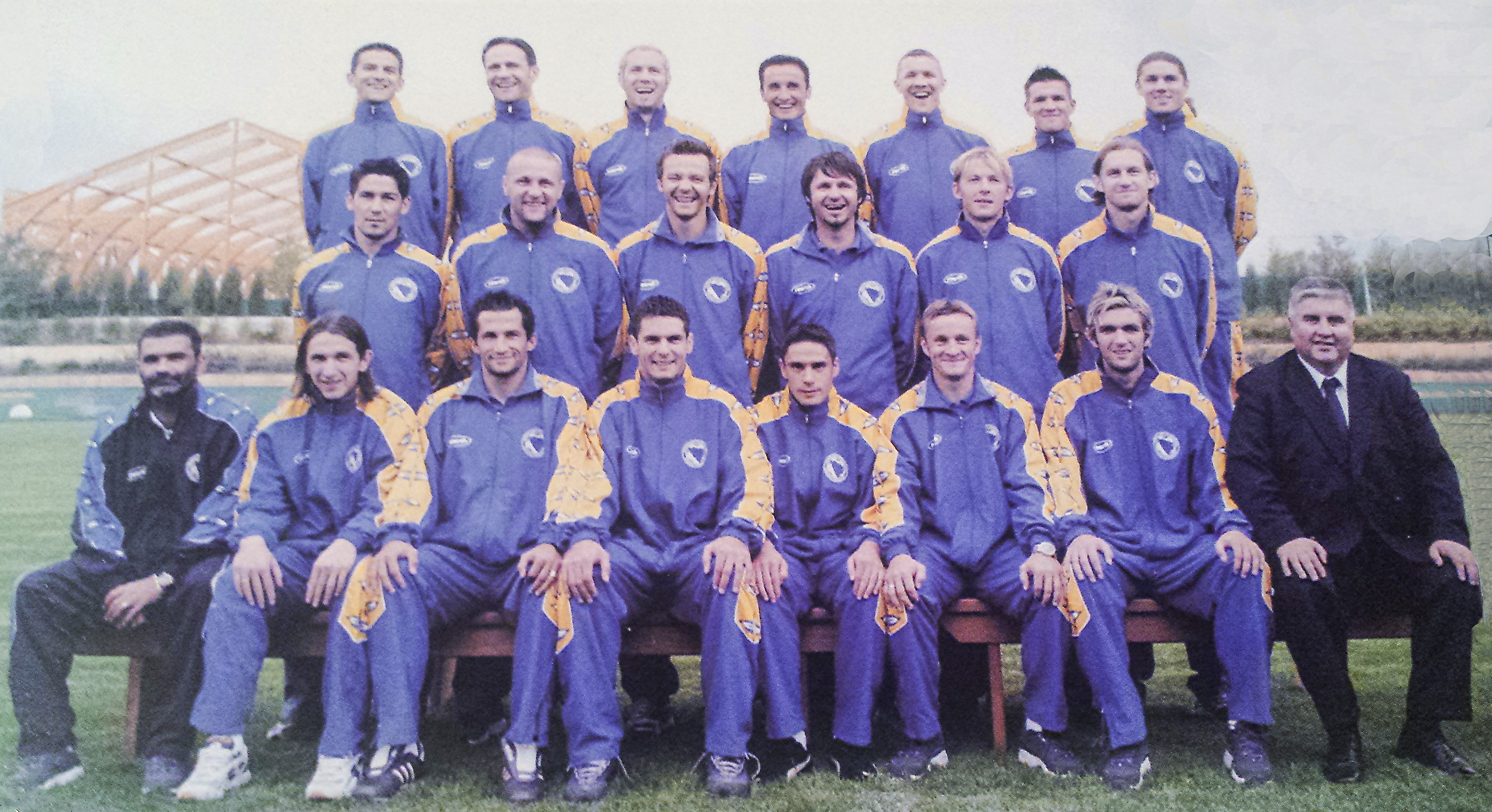
Salihamidžić (sitting, third from left) with the Bosnia and Herzegovina squad during the UEFA Euro 2004 qualifying

Salihamidžić made his international debut for Bosnia and Herzegovina on 8 October 1996 against Croatia. On 6 November 1996, he scored the team's first goal in a friendly 2–1 win over Italy. During his 11 years with the national team, the closest they came was falling one goal short in a match against Denmark that would have enabled them to qualify for UEFA Euro 2004. He has earned a total of 42 caps, scoring 6 goals and his final international was an August 2006 friendly match against France.

== Style of play ==
During his career, Salihamidžić was a tactically versatile player, who usually played as a right midfielder or full back. Less occasionally, he would play center or left midfielder. Being a midfielder, he was observed as having a high work rate from his up-tempo style of play. His crossing and passing on the field were considered to be his strongest traits, as they were central in creating opportunities for his teammates to score.

== Punditry ==
After retiring from professional football in 2012, Salihamidžić started to work as a regular pundit for Sky Deutschland. From summer 2013 to spring 2014, he worked as a football expert for RTL and was a color commentator for Heiko Waßer during the 2013 Audi Cup. He was also an expert for ZDF from February 2014 until the UEFA Champions League Final and during the 2014 FIFA World Cup in Brazil.

== Administrative career ==
=== Bayern Munich ===
On 31 July 2017, Salihamidžić was appointed sporting director of Bayern Munich, following his predecessor Matthias Sammer's withdrawal from the job for health and family reasons a season prior in 2016. Salihamidžić signed a three-year contract until 30 June 2020. Bayern's Chairman, Karl-Heinz Rummenigge said, "In Hasan, we have brought a man to FC Bayern who knows the club very well. He is a very hard-working, serious, loyal and very alert person with great integrity and he speaks five languages. His time in Italy means he has a great network that will definitely be very helpful in his job. We have complete confidence that he will be able to do the job as he should do."

Salihamidžić officially assumed his position on Bayern's executive board on 1 July 2020 as the "board director of sport".

He was sacked as sporting director on 27 May 2023.

== Personal life ==
Salihamidžić has three children: Selina, Nick and Lara June, all born in Munich, with his wife, Esther Copado. Footballer Francisco Copado is his brother-in-law, whose son Lucas (Salihamidžić's nephew) is a footballer for Bayern Munich, alongside Salihamidžić's own son, Nick.

Salihamidžić also holds German citizenship.

== Career statistics ==
=== Club ===
Club	Season	League			National cup (Note: Includes DFB-Pokal, Coppa Italia)		Europe		Other		Total	
Club	Season	Division	Apps	Goals	Apps	Goals	Apps	Goals	Apps	Goals	Apps	Goals
Hamburger SV II	1995–96	Regionalliga Nord	0	0	1	0	—		—		1	0
Hamburger SV	1995–96	Bundesliga	9	2	0	0	—		—		9	2
Hamburger SV	1996–97	Bundesliga	32	7	4	1	5 (Note: Appearances in UEFA Cup)	0	—		41	8
Hamburger SV	1997–98	Bundesliga	31	10	2	1	5 (Note: Appearances in UEFA Intertoto Cup)	0	—		38	11
Hamburger SV	Total		72	19	6	2	10	0	—		88	21
Bayern Munich	1998–99	Bundesliga	30	3	4	0	13 (Note: Appearances in UEFA Champions League)	2	2 (Note: Appearances in DFL-Ligapokal)	0	49	5
Bayern Munich	1999–2000	Bundesliga	30	4	5	3	16	0	2	0	53	7
Bayern Munich	2000–01	Bundesliga	31	4	2	1	15	2	2	0	50	7
Bayern Munich	2001–02	Bundesliga	19	5	1	0	9	1	2	1	31	7
Bayern Munich	2002–03	Bundesliga	12	2	2	1	7	2	1	0	22	5
Bayern Munich	2003–04	Bundesliga	33	4	4	1	8	0	1	0	46	5
Bayern Munich	2004–05	Bundesliga	29	2	5	1	9	2	2	0	45	5
Bayern Munich	2005–06	Bundesliga	21	2	2	0	1	0	1	0	25	2
Bayern Munich	2006–07	Bundesliga	29	4	3	0	10	1	2	0	44	5
Bayern Munich	Total		234	30	28	7	88	10	15	1	365	48
Juventus	2007–08	Serie A	26	4	4	1	—		—		30	5
Juventus	2008–09	Serie A	11	1	1	0	4	0	—		16	1
Juventus	2009–10	Serie A	14	2	1	0	3	0	—		18	2
Juventus	2010–11	Serie A	10	0	0	0	—		—		10	0
Juventus	Total		61	7	6	1	7	0	—		74	8
VfL Wolfsburg	2011–12	Bundesliga	15	3	1	1	—		—		16	4
Career total			382	59	42	11	105	10	15	1	544	81

=== International ===
Appearances and goals by national team and year
National team	Year	Apps	Goals
Bosnia and Herzegovina
Bosnia and Herzegovina	1996	4	2
Bosnia and Herzegovina	1997	4	1
Bosnia and Herzegovina	1998	5	0
Bosnia and Herzegovina	1999	2	1
Bosnia and Herzegovina	2000	4	0
Bosnia and Herzegovina	2001	5	0
Bosnia and Herzegovina	2002	5	0
Bosnia and Herzegovina	2003	3	0
Bosnia and Herzegovina	2004	5	0
Bosnia and Herzegovina	2005	4	2
Bosnia and Herzegovina	2006	1	0
Total		42	6

Scores and results list Bosnia and Herzegovina's goal tally first, score column indicates score after each Salihamidžić goal.

List of international goals scored by Hasan Salihamidžić
No.	Date	Venue	Cap	Opponent	Score	Result	Competition
1	8 October 1996	Stadio Renato Dall'Ara, Bologna, Italy	1	Croatia	1–1	1–4	1998 FIFA World Cup qualification
2	6 November 1996	Koševo Stadium, Sarajevo, Bosnia and Herzegovina	2	Italy	1–0	2–1	Friendly
3	6 September 1997	Maksimir Stadium, Zagreb, Croatia	7	Croatia	2–2	2–3	1998 FIFA World Cup qualification
4	27 January 1999	Ta' Qali National Stadium, Attard, Malta	14	Malta	1–0	1–2	Friendly
5	4 June 2005	Stadio Olimpico, Serravalle, San Marino	39	San Marino	1–0	3–1	2006 FIFA World Cup qualification
6	4 June 2005	Stadio Olimpico, Serravalle, San Marino	39	San Marino	2–0	3–1	2006 FIFA World Cup qualification

== Honours ==
Bayern Munich

- Bundesliga: 1998–99, 1999–2000, 2000–01, 2002–03, 2004–05, 2005–06
- DFB-Pokal: 1999–2000, 2002–03, 2004–05, 2005–06
- DFB-Ligapokal: 1998, 1999, 2000, 2004
- UEFA Champions League: 2000–01
- Intercontinental Cup: 2001

Individual

- Bosnian Sportsman of the Year: 2001
- Bosnian Footballer of the Year: 2000, 2004, 2005, 2006
