= 2006–07 UEFA Champions League knockout stage =

International football competition

The knockout stage of the 2006–07 UEFA Champions League began on 20 February 2007 and culminated with the final match at the Olympic Stadium in Athens on 23 May.

Times are CET/CEST, (Note: CET (UTC+1) for matches to 7 March 2007, and CEST (UTC+2) for matches from 3 April 2007.) as listed by UEFA (local times, if different, are in parentheses).

== Format ==
The draw for the first knockout round took place on 15 December 2006 and involved each of the top two teams from each group in the group stage. The winners of each group were paired up with the runners-up from another group.

Each knockout round tie consisted of two-legged matches, home and away, in which the team with the higher aggregate score progressed to the next round, with the exception of the final, which was played over just one match at a neutral venue. In the event that the two teams' aggregate scores were tied, the team that scored more goals in their away leg progressed to the next round, with extra time and a penalty shoot-out being used if the tie was still level.

== Qualified teams ==
Key to colours
Seeded in round of 16 draw
Unseeded in round of 16 draw

Group	Winners	Runners-up
A	(England) Chelsea	(Spain) Barcelona
B	(Germany) Bayern Munich	(Italy) Internazionale
C	(England) Liverpool	(Netherlands) PSV Eindhoven
D	(Spain) Valencia	(Italy) Roma
E	(France) Lyon	(Spain) Real Madrid
F	(England) Manchester United	(Scotland) Celtic
G	(England) Arsenal	(Portugal) Porto
H	(Italy) Milan	(France) Lille

== Bracket ==
Round of 16
(Italy) Roma	0	2	2
(France) Lyon	0	0	0
(France) Lille	0	0	0
(England) Manchester United	1	1	2
(Scotland) Celtic	0	0	0
(Italy) Milan (a.e.t.)	0	1	1
(Spain) Real Madrid	3	1	4
(Germany) Bayern Munich (a)	2	2	4
(Portugal) Porto	1	1	2
(England) Chelsea	1	2	3
(Italy) Internazionale	2	0	2
(Spain) Valencia (a)	2	0	2
(Netherlands) PSV Eindhoven	1	1	2
(England) Arsenal	0	1	1
(Spain) Barcelona	1	1	2
(England) Liverpool (a)	2	0	2

Quarter-finals
(Italy) Roma	2	1	3
(England) Manchester United	1	7	8
(Italy) Milan	2	2	4
(Germany) Bayern Munich	2	0	2
(England) Chelsea	1	2	3
(Spain) Valencia	1	1	2
(Netherlands) PSV Eindhoven	0	0	0
(England) Liverpool	3	1	4

Semi-finals
(England) Manchester United	3	0	3
(Italy) Milan	2	3	5
(England) Chelsea	1	0	1 (1)
(England) Liverpool (p)	0	1	1 (4)

Final
23 May – Athens
(Italy) Milan	2
(England) Liverpool	1

== Round of 16 ==
=== Summary ===
The draw for the first knockout round of the competition took place on 15 December 2006 in Nyon, Switzerland. The team drawn first in each tie plays the first leg of their tie at home, and the second leg away.

On 8 February 2007, the Italian government announced that the San Siro in Milan was unsafe for spectators after the rioting that had occurred during and after a league match in Catania six days earlier. As a result, the venues of the first leg of the Inter-Valencia tie scheduled for 21 February and the second leg of the Celtic-Milan tie scheduled for 7 March were thrown into doubt. Various proposals and offers of the use of stadia outside Italy were made, but it was finally agreed that the Inter-Valencia tie would be played at the San Siro with a reduced capacity of 36,000. After further work at the San Siro, Italian authorities and UEFA announced that the second leg of Celtic-Milan would go ahead at the stadium, at its full capacity of 85,700. 4,500 seats were reserved for Celtic supporters.

The first legs were played on 20 and 21 February 2007, with the second legs on 6 and 7 March.

Team 1	Agg.	Team 2	1st leg	2nd leg
Porto (Portugal)	2–3	(England) Chelsea	1–1	1–2
Celtic (Scotland)	0–1	(Italy) Milan	0–0	0–1 (a.e.t.)
PSV Eindhoven (Netherlands)	2–1	(England) Arsenal	1–0	1–1
Lille (France)	0–2	(England) Manchester United	0–1	0–1
Roma (Italy)	2–0	(France) Lyon	0–0	2–0
Barcelona (Spain)	2–2 (a)	(England) Liverpool	1–2	1–0
Real Madrid (Spain)	4–4 (a)	(Germany) Bayern Munich	3–2	1–2
Internazionale (Italy)	2–2 (a)	(Spain) Valencia	2–2	0–0

=== Matches ===
21 February 2007
20:45 (19:45 UTC+0)

Porto (Portugal)	1–1	(England) Chelsea
Meireles 12'	Report	Shevchenko 16'

Estádio do Dragão, Porto
Attendance: 50,216
Referee: Massimo Busacca (Switzerland)
6 March 2007
20:45 (19:45 UTC+0)

Chelsea (England)	2–1	(Portugal) Porto
Robben 48'; Ballack 78'	Report	Quaresma 15'

Stamford Bridge, London
Attendance: 39,041
Referee: Roberto Rosetti (Italy)

Chelsea won 3–2 on aggregate.

20 February 2007
20:45 (19:45 UTC+0)

Celtic (Scotland)	0–0	(Italy) Milan
	Report

Celtic Park, Glasgow
Attendance: 58,785
Referee: Terje Hauge (Norway)
7 March 2007
20:45

Milan (Italy)	1–0 (a.e.t.)	(Scotland) Celtic
Kaká 93'	Report

San Siro, Milan
Attendance: 52,914
Referee: Konrad Plautz (Austria)

Milan won 1–0 on aggregate.

20 February 2007
20:45

PSV Eindhoven (Netherlands)	1–0	(England) Arsenal
Méndez 61'	Report

Philips Stadion, Eindhoven
Attendance: 35,100
Referee: Tom Henning Øvrebø (Norway)
7 March 2007
20:45 (19:45 UTC+0)

Arsenal (England)	1–1	(Netherlands) PSV Eindhoven
Alex 58' (o.g.)	Report	Alex 83'

Emirates Stadium, London
Attendance: 60,073
Referee: Alain Hamer (Luxembourg)

PSV Eindhoven won 2–1 on aggregate.

20 February 2007
20:45

Lille (France)	0–1	(England) Manchester United
	Report	Giggs 83'

Stade Félix-Bollaert, Lens
Attendance: 40,725
Referee: Eric Braamhaar (Netherlands)
7 March 2007
20:45 (19:45 UTC+0)

Manchester United (England)	1–0	(France) Lille
Larsson 72'	Report

Old Trafford, Manchester
Attendance: 75,182
Referee: Luis Medina Cantalejo (Spain)

Manchester United won 2–0 on aggregate.

21 February 2007
20:45

Roma (Italy)	0–0	(France) Lyon
	Report

Stadio Olimpico, Rome
Attendance: 60,053
Referee: Mike Riley (England)
6 March 2007
20:45

Lyon (France)	0–2	(Italy) Roma
	Report	Totti 22'; Mancini 44'

Stade de Gerland, Lyon
Attendance: 39,260
Referee: Manuel Mejuto González (Spain)

Roma won 2–0 on aggregate.

21 February 2007
20:45

Barcelona (Spain)	1–2	(England) Liverpool
Deco 14'	Report	Bellamy 43'; Riise 74'

Camp Nou, Barcelona
Attendance: 93,641
Referee: Kyros Vassaras (Greece)
6 March 2007
20:45 (19:45 UTC+0)

Liverpool (England)	0–1	(Spain) Barcelona
	Report	Guðjohnsen 75'

Anfield, Liverpool
Attendance: 42,579
Referee: Herbert Fandel (Germany)

2–2 on aggregate; Liverpool won on away goals.

20 February 2007
20:45

Real Madrid (Spain)	3–2	(Germany) Bayern Munich
Raúl 10', 28'; Van Nistelrooy 34'	Report	Lúcio 23'; Van Bommel 88'

Santiago Bernabéu, Madrid
Attendance: 70,928
Referee: Frank De Bleeckere (Belgium)
7 March 2007
20:45

Bayern Munich (Germany)	2–1	(Spain) Real Madrid
Makaay 1'; Lúcio 66'	Report	Van Nistelrooy 83' (pen.)

Allianz Arena, Munich
Attendance: 66,000
Referee: Ľuboš Micheľ (Slovakia)

4–4 on aggregate; Bayern Munich won on away goals.

21 February 2007
20:45

Internazionale (Italy)	2–2	(Spain) Valencia
Cambiasso 29'; Maicon 76'	Report	Villa 64'; Silva 86'

San Siro, Milan
Attendance: 25,269 (Note: The Internazionale v Valencia match was played at reduced capacity due to security issues with the San Siro.)
Referee: Martin Hansson (Sweden)
6 March 2007
20:45

Valencia (Spain)	0–0	(Italy) Internazionale
	Report

Mestalla, Valencia
Attendance: 48,109
Referee: Wolfgang Stark (Germany)

2–2 on aggregate; Valencia won on away goals.

== Quarter-finals ==
=== Summary ===
The draw for the final stages, including the quarter-finals, semi-finals and final, was held on 9 March 2007 in Athens, Greece. The draw was conducted by ad interim UEFA CEO Gianni Infantino, assisted by Friedrich Stickler, chairman of the UEFA Club Competitions Committee. Theodoros Zagorakis, the captain of Greece in Euro 2004, was appointed ambassador for the final.

The first legs were played on 3 and 4 April, and the second legs were played on 10 and 11 April 2007.

Team 1	Agg.	Team 2	1st leg	2nd leg
Milan (Italy)	4–2	(Germany) Bayern Munich	2–2	2–0
PSV Eindhoven (Netherlands)	0–4	(England) Liverpool	0–3	0–1
Roma (Italy)	3–8	(England) Manchester United	2–1	1–7
Chelsea (England)	3–2	(Spain) Valencia	1–1	2–1

=== Matches ===
3 April 2007
20:45

Milan (Italy)	2–2	(Germany) Bayern Munich
Pirlo 40'; Kaká 84' (pen.)	Report	Van Buyten 78', 90+3'

San Siro, Milan
Attendance: 67,500
Referee: Yuri Baskakov (Russia)
11 April 2007
20:45

Bayern Munich (Germany)	0–2	(Italy) Milan
	Report	Seedorf 27'; Inzaghi 31'

Allianz Arena, Munich
Attendance: 65,000
Referee: Manuel Mejuto González (Spain)

Milan won 4–2 on aggregate.

3 April 2007
20:45

PSV Eindhoven (Netherlands)	0–3	(England) Liverpool
	Report	Gerrard 27'; Riise 49'; Crouch 63'

Philips Stadion, Eindhoven
Attendance: 35,100
Referee: Bertrand Layec (France)
11 April 2007
20:45 (19:45 UTC+1)

Liverpool (England)	1–0	(Netherlands) PSV Eindhoven
Crouch 67'	Report

Anfield, Liverpool
Attendance: 41,447
Referee: Roberto Rosetti (Italy)

Liverpool won 4–0 on aggregate.

4 April 2007
20:45

Roma (Italy)	2–1	(England) Manchester United
Taddei 44'; Vučinić 67'	Report	Rooney 60'

Stadio Olimpico, Rome
Attendance: 68,389
Referee: Herbert Fandel (Germany)
10 April 2007
20:45 (19:45 UTC+1)

Manchester United (England)	7–1	(Italy) Roma
Carrick 11', 60'; Smith 17'; Rooney 19'; Ronaldo 44', 49'; Evra 81'	Report	De Rossi 69'

Old Trafford, Manchester
Attendance: 74,476
Referee: Ľuboš Micheľ (Slovakia)

Manchester United won 8–3 on aggregate.

4 April 2007
20:45 (19:45 UTC+1)

Chelsea (England)	1–1	(Spain) Valencia
Drogba 53'	Report	Silva 30'

Stamford Bridge, London
Attendance: 38,065
Referee: Frank De Bleeckere (Belgium)
10 April 2007
20:45

Valencia (Spain)	1–2	(England) Chelsea
Morientes 32'	Report	Shevchenko 52'; Essien 90'

Mestalla, Valencia
Attendance: 47,280
Referee: Kyros Vassaras (Greece)

Chelsea won 3–2 on aggregate.

== Semi-finals ==
=== Summary ===
The first legs were played on 24 and 25 April, with the second legs on 1 and 2 May 2007.

Team 1	Agg.	Team 2	1st leg	2nd leg
Chelsea (England)	1–1 (1–4 p)	(England) Liverpool	1–0	0–1 (a.e.t.)
Manchester United (England)	3–5	(Italy) Milan	3–2	0–3

=== Matches ===
25 April 2007
20:45 (19:45 UTC+1)

Chelsea (England)	1–0	(England) Liverpool
J. Cole 29'	Report

Stamford Bridge, London
Attendance: 39,483
Referee: Markus Merk (Germany)
1 May 2007
20:45 (19:45 UTC+1)

Liverpool (England)	1–0 (a.e.t.)	(England) Chelsea
Agger 22'	Report
Penalties
Zenden (penalty scored); Alonso (penalty scored); Gerrard (penalty scored); Kuyt (penalty scored)	4–1	(penalty missed) Robben; (penalty scored) Lampard; (penalty missed) Geremi

Anfield, Liverpool
Attendance: 42,554
Referee: Manuel Mejuto González (Spain)

1–1 on aggregate; Liverpool won 4–1 on penalties.

24 April 2007
20:45 (19:45 UTC+1)

Manchester United (England)	3–2	(Italy) Milan
Ronaldo 5'; Rooney 59', 90+1'	Report	Kaká 22', 37'

Old Trafford, Manchester
Attendance: 73,820
Referee: Kyros Vassaras (Greece)
2 May 2007
20:45

Milan (Italy)	3–0	(England) Manchester United
Kaká 11'; Seedorf 30'; Gilardino 78'	Report

San Siro, Milan
Attendance: 67,500
Referee: Frank De Bleeckere (Belgium)

Milan won 5–3 on aggregate.

== Final ==
The final was played on 23 May 2007 at the Olympic Stadium in Athens, Greece. The final was contested by Milan of Italy and Liverpool of England. Milan scored first through Filippo Inzaghi just before half time. Inzaghi scored again in the 82nd minute, before Dirk Kuyt scored a late consolation goal a minute before full-time. As winners, Milan went on to represent UEFA at the 2007 FIFA Club World Cup.

23 May 2007
20:45 (21:45 UTC+3)

Milan (Italy)	2–1	(England) Liverpool
Inzaghi 45', 82'	Report	Kuyt 89'

Olympic Stadium, Athens
Attendance: 63,000
Referee: Herbert Fandel (Germany)
