= Ľuboš Micheľ =

Slovak football referee (born 1968)

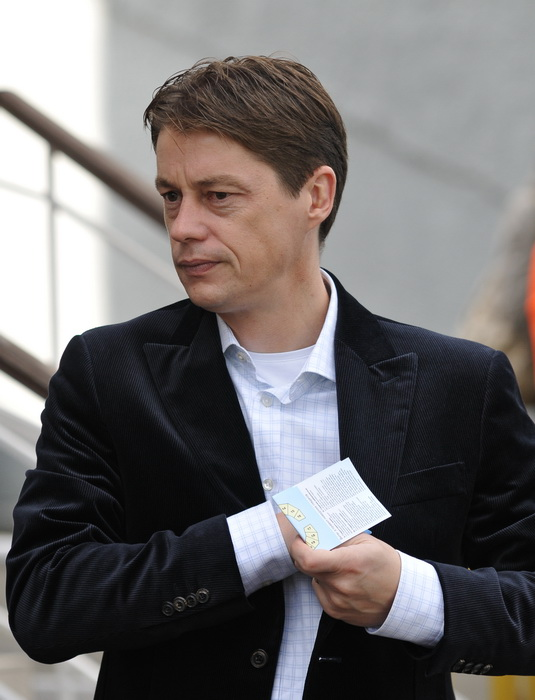
- Micheľ in September 2009
- Born: 16 May 1968 (age 58); Stropkov, Czechoslovakia (now Slovakia)
- Other occupation: Factory Manager

Domestic
Years	League	Role
1993 – 2008	Slovak Superliga	Referee

International
Years	League	Role
1993 – 2008	UEFA	Referee

Ľuboš Micheľ (Slovak pronunciation: [ˈʎubɔʂ ˈmixeʎ]; born 16 May 1968) is a retired Slovak football referee. He is considered one of the best Slovak international referees in the history. He regularly refereed Champions League matches with the highlight being at the 2008 Champions League final between Manchester United and Chelsea. He officiated at World Cups in 2002 and 2006 and at the 2004 and 2008 EUROs. He ended his refereeing career in 2008.

== Referee career ==
Micheľ debuted in the Slovak Superliga on 16 May 1993 in the match between Humenné vs. Prešov (0:0). Shortly after domestic debut, he became a FIFA referee at the age of 25 (in 1993). At a young age, Micheľ refereed a number of games in Lebanon.

In 1995, Micheľ officiated the semifinal at Euro U16 and in 1998 he was selected as a referee in the final game at Euro U21 in Romania.

Micheľ was one of three Europeans - along with German Fandel and Frenchman Breu - to referee the tournament at the 2000 Olympic Games in Sydney (Nigeria - Honduras, Republic of Korea - Chile).

When Micheľ took charge of the Paraguay v South Africa game at the 2002 FIFA World Cup, he became the first Slovak to referee a FIFA World Cup Finals match. (Three Slovak referees, Martin Macka (1958), Karol Galba (1962, 1966) and Vojtech Christov (1982, 1986) count to Czechoslovakia).

Micheľ was selected to referee the 2003 UEFA Cup Final in Seville, Spain, between Porto and Celtic, one of the biggest appointments for a UEFA referee.

Micheľ officiated at Euro 2004, taking charge of 3 games, including the quarter-final between Sweden and the Netherlands. He issued 16 yellow cards, but no reds, at an average of 5.33 cards per game, placing him sixth on the cards-per-game table.

In the 2004–05 UEFA Champions League, during the semi-final second leg match between Liverpool and Chelsea at Anfield in which the home team won by 1–0 and hence qualified for the Final, there was debate over whether a "ghost goal" had been scored by Liverpool winger Luis García. A computerised 're-enactment' suggested the ball had not crossed the line, and that Micheľ would have been unable to see it from his angle, while motion expert Mike Spann concluded that Micheľ had made the correct decision. Micheľ himself stated that his decision was based on the reaction of the assistant referee because had he not awarded Liverpool the goal, he would have awarded them a penalty kick and sent off Chelsea goalkeeper Petr Čech for a foul on Milan Baroš instead. After studying a series of still images of the incident, motion expert Dr. Mike Spann concluded that Micheľ had made the correct decision by signalling a goal.

Micheľ was ranked the world's third best referee in 2005 by the IFFHS, second best in 2006 and third best again in 2007.

=== 2006 FIFA World Cup ===
Micheľ was selected as one of 21 referees for the 2006 World Cup in Germany. After his performance in the first two rounds, FIFA chose him as one of twelve referees to officiate the final eight games of the tournament. Micheľ has handed out the second highest number of cards per match (8) of any referee in the tournament. The only person with a higher tally is Valentin Ivanov, who handed out an average of ten.

Micheľ matches have been considered tempestuous. In the group stage he took charge of the game between Portugal and Mexico; the game ending 2–1 to Portugal. He issued 8 yellow cards, sent a player off for diving, gave two penalties, and rejected a claim for one in the second half.

In the Round of 16 he took charge of the Brazil-Ghana match, won by Brazil 3–0. He sent off one Ghanaian player for diving and ordered the Ghana coach, Ratomir Dujković, to leave the field after the coach argued with him about an offside goal.

Micheľ refereed the quarterfinals loss of Argentina to the hosts Germany, which was tied 1–1 and went into extra time and ended on penalty kicks. He handed out seven yellows during the match. Micheľ gave a red card to Argentina's unused substitute Leandro Damián Cufré for kicking Per Mertesacker during the post-game melee involving the two teams and some members of their coaching staffs.

=== 2008 Champions League final ===
Micheľ was selected to be the referee of the 2008 UEFA Champions League final, the match between Manchester United and Chelsea. The match went to a penalty shootout which, after much excitement, was eventually won by Manchester United. Micheľ became only the second referee to give a red card in a UEFA Champions League final (the first being Terje Hauge in 2006) when he sent Didier Drogba off in extra time for a slap at Nemanja Vidić's chin.

Michel was selected to be a referee at the UEFA Euro 2008, where he refereed the Group A game between Switzerland and Turkey, the Group C game between France and Italy and the quarter-final match between Netherlands and Russia.

On 23 October 2008, he retired from active referee activity due to problems with his Achilles’ tendon. His last match was the game Metalurh Zaporizhya against Metalist Kharkiv in the Ukrainian Premier League.

== Post referee career ==
Micheľ was a manager of a car tyre factory outside of refereeing, and previously a teacher. He speaks English, Russian, German and Polish in addition to his native Slovak. He founded the society Talent to support young Slovak football players. Micheľ has been a Member of National Council of the Slovak Republic since 2006.

On 27 October 2008, Micheľ signed a contract with Shakhtar Donetsk as the head of the international competitions department.

For a brief period of time between 2006 and 2010, Ľuboš Micheľ was serving as a lawmaker in the Slovak parliament, where he was elected in the 2006 elections.

Between December 2015 and November 2018, he worked for PAOK FC as Sporting Director and president. Since September 2021, Micheľ has worked as president for 1. FC Tatran Prešov.

In October 2022, Micheľ ran unsuccessfully for Mayor of Prešov.

In August 2024, Micheľ step down from president role at 1. FC Tatran Prešov due to family and work reasons. In the 19 July 2025, he was again named as president of the club from Prešov.

Preceded by 2002 (Portugal) Vítor Melo Pereira	UEFA Cup Final referees 2003 (Slovakia) Ľuboš Micheľ	Succeeded by 2004 (Italy) Pierluigi Collina
Preceded by 2003 (Russia) Valentin Ivanov	FIFA Confederations Cup Final referees 2005 (Slovakia) Ľuboš Micheľ	Succeeded by 2009 (Sweden) Martin Hansson
Preceded by 2007 (Germany) Herbert Fandel	UEFA Champions League Final referees 2008 (Slovakia) Ľuboš Micheľ	Succeeded by 2009 (Switzerland) Massimo Busacca
