= 2005–06 UEFA Cup qualifying rounds =

The qualifying rounds for the 2005–06 UEFA Cup began on 14 July 2005. In total, there were two qualifying rounds which narrowed clubs down to 80 teams in preparation for the first round.

Times are CEST (UTC+2), as listed by UEFA (local times, if different, are in parentheses).

== Teams ==
Regions used to divide teams in the qualifying rounds of the UEFA Cup: Northern Central–East Southern–Mediterranean

In total, 87 teams entered qualifying stage, which consisted of the following rounds:

- First qualifying round (50 teams): 50 teams which entered in this round.
- Second qualifying round (62 teams): 37 teams which entered in this round, and 25 winners of the first qualifying round.

The 31 winners of the second qualifying round advanced to the first round, joining 49 other teams.

In the qualifying rounds, UEFA divided the participating teams into three geographical regions: Northern, Central–East, and Southern–Mediterranean. Teams were then seeded within their respective regions, rather than being seeded among all participating teams of the round. This meant that a club potentially seeded in an open draw format could be unseeded in the regional system, or vice versa. The regional allocation of countries was generally as follows:

- Northern: Belgium, Denmark, England, Estonia, Faroe Islands, Finland, Iceland, Latvia, Lithuania, Luxembourg, Netherlands, Northern Ireland, Norway, Republic of Ireland, Scotland, Sweden, Wales
- Central–East: Armenia, Austria, Azerbaijan, Belarus, Czech Republic, France, Georgia, Germany, Hungary, Liechtenstein, Moldova, Poland, Russia, Slovakia, Switzerland, Ukraine
- Southern–Mediterranean: Albania, Andorra, Bosnia and Herzegovina, Bulgaria, Croatia, Cyprus, Greece, Israel, Italy, Macedonia, Malta, Portugal, Romania, San Marino, Serbia and Montenegro, Slovenia, Spain, Turkey

However, UEFA could make exceptions to these allocations to ensure an even number of teams in each region.

Below were the participating teams of the qualifying rounds (with their 2005 UEFA club coefficients), grouped by their starting rounds.

Key to colours
Winners of second qualifying round advance to first round

Second qualifying round
Team	Region	Coeff.
(Turkey) Beşiktaş	S–M	37.872
Austria Wien	C–E	27.208
(Austria) GAK	C–E	25.208
(Ukraine) Dnipro Dnipropetrovsk	C–E	24.200
(Serbia and Montenegro) Red Star Belgrade	S–M	21.012
(Belgium) Genk	NOR	19.476
(Israel) Maccabi Tel Aviv	S–M	19.218
(Switzerland) Grasshopper	C–E	18.887
(Russia) Zenit Saint Petersburg	C–E	18.469
(Czech Republic) Teplice	C–E	18.223
(Bulgaria) Levski Sofia	S–M	18.118
(Poland) Legia Warsaw	C–E	16.929
(Denmark) Copenhagen	NOR	15.676
(Bulgaria) Litex Lovech	S–M	14.118
(Sweden) Halmstads BK	NOR	13.076
(Romania) Dinamo București	S–M	12.101
(Poland) Groclin Grodzisk Wielkopolski	C–E	11.929
(Scotland) Dundee United	NOR	10.476
(Ukraine) Metalurh Donetsk	C–E	10.200
(Sweden) Djurgårdens IF	NOR	10.076
(Denmark) Midtjylland	NOR	8.676
(Russia) Krylia Sovetov Samara	C–E	8.469
(Austria) Superfund	C–E	8.208
(Norway) Brann	NOR	7.665
(Israel) Maccabi Petah Tikva	S–M	7.218
(Israel) Ashdod	S–M	7.218
(Serbia and Montenegro) Zeta	S–M	7.012
(Serbia and Montenegro) OFK Beograd	S–M	7.012
(Croatia) Rijeka	S–M	6.980
(Poland) Wisła Płock	C–E	6.929
(Switzerland) Zürich	C–E	6.887
(Norway) Tromsø	NOR	6.665
(Bulgaria) Lokomotiv Plovdiv	S–M	6.118
(Croatia) Inter Zaprešić	S–M	5.980
(Hungary) Sopron	C–E	5.390
(Slovenia) Publikum	S–M	4.190
(Slovakia) Dukla Banská Bystrica	C–E	3.850

First qualifying round
Team	Region	Coeff.
(Hungary) Ferencváros	C–E	18.390
(Germany) Mainz 05	C–E/NOR	16.166
(Norway) Viking	NOR	12.665
(Romania) Rapid București	S–M	8.101
(Denmark) Esbjerg	NOR	6.676
(Cyprus) APOEL	S–M	5.695
(Slovakia) Žilina	C–E	3.850
(Latvia) Ventspils	NOR	3.200
(Slovenia) Domžale	S–M	3.190
(Cyprus) Omonia	S–M	2.695
(North Macedonia) Vardar	S–M	2.485
(Bosnia and Herzegovina) Široki Brijeg	S–M	2.365
(Bosnia and Herzegovina) Žepče	S–M	2.365
(Latvia) Liepājas Metalurgs	NOR	2.200
(Finland) MYPA	NOR	2.158
(Finland) Allianssi	NOR	2.158
(Moldova) Nistru Otaci	C–E	2.090
(Moldova) Dacia Chișinău	C–E	2.090
(Georgia (country)) Locomotive Tbilisi	C–E	2.035
(Georgia (country)) Torpedo Kutaisi	C–E	2.035
(Malta) Birkirkara	S–M	1.990
(Lithuania) Ekranas	NOR	1.760
(Lithuania) Atlantas	NOR	1.760
(Iceland) Keflavík	NOR	1.595
(Iceland) ÍBV	NOR	1.595
(North Macedonia) Bashkimi	S–M	1.485
(Republic of Ireland) Longford Town	NOR	1.375
(Republic of Ireland) Cork City	NOR	1.375
(Belarus) MTZ-RIPO Minsk	C–E	1.347
(Belarus) BATE Borisov	C–E	1.347
(Liechtenstein) Vaduz	C–E/S–M	1.320
(Armenia) Banants	C–E	0.990
(Armenia) Mika	C–E	0.990
(Malta) Hibernians	S–M	0.990
(Albania) Teuta	S–M	0.880
(Albania) Elbasani	S–M	0.880
(Estonia) TVMK	NOR	0.825
(Estonia) Flora	NOR	0.825
(Northern Ireland) Portadown	NOR	0.715
(Northern Ireland) Linfield	NOR	0.715
(Wales) Carmarthen Town	NOR	0.605
(Wales) Rhyl	NOR	0.605
(Luxembourg) Pétange	NOR	0.550
(Luxembourg) Etzella Ettelbruck	NOR	0.550
(Azerbaijan) Khazar Lankaran	C–E	0.440
(Azerbaijan) Baku	C–E	0.440
(Faroe Islands) B36	NOR	0.330
(Faroe Islands) NSÍ	NOR	0.330
(Andorra) Sant Julià	S–M	0.000
(San Marino) Domagnano	S–M	0.000

Notes

1. ^{†} Mainz 05 of Germany (usually in Central–East) were moved to the Northern region for the second qualifying round (while remaining in their usual region for the first qualifying round).
2. ^{‡} Vaduz of Liechtenstein (usually in Central–East) were moved to the Southern–Mediterranean region for the second qualifying round (while remaining in their usual region for the first qualifying round).

== First qualifying round ==
The draw for the first qualifying round was held on 24 June 2005.

=== Seeding ===
A total of 50 teams played in the first qualifying round. Prior to the draw, UEFA divided the teams into three regions, with each region containing seeded and unseeded teams in accordance with the principles set by the Club Competitions Committee. Seeding of teams within each region was based on their 2005 UEFA club coefficients.

Southern–Mediterranean region		Central–East region		Northern region	
Seeded	Unseeded	Seeded	Unseeded	Seeded	Unseeded
(Romania) Rapid București; (Cyprus) APOEL; (Slovenia) Domžale; (Cyprus) Omonia; (North Macedonia) Vardar; (Bosnia and Herzegovina) Široki Brijeg; (Bosnia and Herzegovina) Žepče	(Malta) Birkirkara; (North Macedonia) Bashkimi; (Malta) Hibernians; (Albania) Teuta; (Albania) Elbasani; (Andorra) Sant Julià; (San Marino) Domagnano	(Hungary) Ferencváros; (Germany) Mainz 05; (Slovakia) Žilina; (Moldova) Nistru Otaci; (Moldova) Dacia Chișinău; (Georgia (country)) Locomotive Tbilisi; (Georgia (country)) Torpedo Kutaisi	(Belarus) MTZ-RIPO Minsk; (Belarus) BATE Borisov; (Liechtenstein) Vaduz; (Armenia) Mika; (Armenia) Banants; (Azerbaijan) Baku; (Azerbaijan) Khazar Lankaran	(Norway) Viking; (Denmark) Esbjerg; (Latvia) Ventspils; (Latvia) Liepājas Metalurgs; (Finland) MYPA; (Finland) Allianssi; (Lithuania) Ekranas; (Lithuania) Atlantas; (Iceland) Keflavík; (Iceland) ÍBV; (Republic of Ireland) Longford Town	(Republic of Ireland) Cork City; (Estonia) TVMK; (Estonia) Flora; (Northern Ireland) Portadown; (Northern Ireland) Linfield; (Wales) Rhyl; (Wales) Carmarthen Town; (Luxembourg) Pétange; (Luxembourg) Etzella Ettelbruck; (Faroe Islands) B36; (Faroe Islands) NSÍ

=== Summary ===
Team 1	Agg.	Team 2	1st leg	2nd leg
Southern–Mediterranean region
Bashkimi (North Macedonia)	4–1	(Bosnia and Herzegovina) Žepče	3–0 (Note: The Baskimi v Žepče first leg match was awarded 3–0 to Baskimi.)	1–1
Birkirkara (Malta)	0–6	(Cyprus) APOEL	0–2	0–4
Sant Julià (Andorra)	0–10	(Romania) Rapid București	0–5	0–5
Teuta (Albania)	3–4	(Bosnia and Herzegovina) Široki Brijeg	3–1	0–3
Elbasani (Albania)	1–1 (a)	(North Macedonia) Vardar	1–1	0–0
Omonia (Cyprus)	6–0	(Malta) Hibernians	3–0	3–0
Domagnano (San Marino)	0–8	(Slovenia) Domžale	0–5	0–3
Central–East region
Ferencváros (Hungary)	2–3	(Belarus) MTZ-RIPO Minsk	0–2	2–1
Banants (Armenia)	4–3	(Georgia (country)) Locomotive Tbilisi	2–3	2–0
Torpedo Kutaisi (Georgia (country))	0–6	(Belarus) BATE Borisov	0–1	0–5
Vaduz (Liechtenstein)	2–1	(Moldova) Dacia Chișinău	2–0	0–1
Baku (Azerbaijan)	2–3	(Slovakia) Žilina	1–0	1–3
Mainz 05 (Germany)	4–0	(Armenia) Mika	4–0	0–0
Nistru Otaci (Moldova)	5–2	(Azerbaijan) Khazar Lankaran	3–1	2–1
Northern region
Longford Town (Republic of Ireland)	3–5	(Wales) Carmarthen Town	2–0	1–5
Ekranas (Lithuania)	1–2	(Republic of Ireland) Cork City	0–2	1–0
ÍBV (Iceland)	2–3	(Faroe Islands) B36	1–1	1–2
Allianssi (Finland)	4–1	(Luxembourg) Pétange	3–0	1–1
Linfield (Northern Ireland)	2–2 (a)	(Latvia) Ventspils	1–0	1–2
NSÍ (Faroe Islands)	0–6	(Latvia) Liepājas Metalurgs	0–3	0–3
Etzella Ettelbruck (Luxembourg)	0–6	(Iceland) Keflavík	0–4	0–2
Portadown (Northern Ireland)	1–3	(Norway) Viking	1–2	0–1
TVMK (Estonia)	1–2	(Finland) MYPA	1–1	0–1
Rhyl (Wales)	4–4 (a)	(Lithuania) Atlantas	2–1	2–3
Esbjerg (Denmark)	7–2	(Estonia) Flora	1–2	6–0

=== Southern–Mediterranean region ===
14 July 2005
18:00

Bashkimi (North Macedonia)	3–0 Awarded (Note: The Baskimi v Žepče match, which originally finished as a 0–0 draw, was awarded 3–0 to Baskimi due to Žepče fielding an ineligible player)	(Bosnia and Herzegovina) Žepče
	Report

Gradski stadion, Skopje
Attendance: 1,500
Referee: Csaba Sapi (Hungary)
28 July 2005
20:00

Žepče (Bosnia and Herzegovina)	1–1	(North Macedonia) Bashkimi
Mešić 80'	Report	Gjurcevski 49'

Bilino Polje Stadium, Zenica
Attendance: 1,243
Referee: Marek Mikołajewski (Poland)

Bashkimi won 4–1 on aggregate.

14 July 2005
21:00

Birkirkara (Malta)	0–2	(Cyprus) APOEL
	Report	Georgiou 72'; Jovanović 79'

Ta' Qali National Stadium, Ta' Qali
Attendance: 651
Referee: Calum Murray (Scotland)
28 July 2005
19:00

APOEL (Cyprus)	4–0	(Malta) Birkirkara
Kaklamanos 38', 58'; Neophytou 52'; Georgiou 90+3'	Report

GSP Stadium, Nicosia
Attendance: 6,300
Referee: Pavel Královec (Czech Republic)

APOEL won 6–0 on aggregate.

14 July 2005
18:45

Sant Julià (Andorra)	0–5	(Romania) Rapid București
	Report	Niculae 10', 34', 66'; Álvarez 62' (o.g.); Vasilache 76'

Estadi Comunal d'Andorra la Vella, Andorra la Vella
Attendance: 900
Referee: Anthony Buttimer (Republic of Ireland)
28 July 2005
19:15

Rapid București (Romania)	5–0	(Andorra) Sant Julià
Buga 1', 14', 20', 29'; Măldărăşanu 80'	Report

Stadionul Giuleşti-Valentin Stănescu, Bucharest
Attendance: 2,585
Referee: Brian Lawlor (Wales)

Rapid București won 10–0 on aggregate.

14 July 2005
17:30

Teuta (Albania)	3–1	(Bosnia and Herzegovina) Široki Brijeg
Mançaku 32', 58'; Xhafa 48'	Report	Abramović 82'

Niko Dovana Stadium, Durrës
Attendance: 1,100
Referee: Christopher Lautier (Malta)
28 July 2005
20:15

Široki Brijeg (Bosnia and Herzegovina)	3–0	(Albania) Teuta
Medvid 33'; Erceg 43'; Wagner 70'	Report

Stadion Pecara, Široki Brijeg
Attendance: 3,000
Referee: Veaceslav Banari (Moldova)

Široki Brijeg won 4–3 on aggregate.

14 July 2005
17:30

Elbasani (Albania)	1–1	(North Macedonia) Vardar
K. Dalipi 28'	Report	Tričkovski 66'

Ruzhdi Bizhuta Stadium, Elbasan
Attendance: 7,150
Referee: Robert Krajnc (Slovenia)
28 July 2005
20:00

Vardar (North Macedonia)	0–0	(Albania) Elbasani
	Report

Gradski stadion, Skopje
Attendance: 4,000
Referee: Igorj Ishchenko (Ukraine)

1–1 on aggregate; Vardar won on away goals.

14 July 2005
19:00

Omonia (Cyprus)	3–0	(Malta) Hibernians
Mguni 30'; Kožlej 47'; Vakouftsis 85' (pen.)	Report

GSP Stadium, Nicosia
Attendance: 11,073
Referee: Asaf Kenan (Israel)
28 July 2005
21:00

Hibernians (Malta)	0–3	(Cyprus) Omonia
	Report	Grozdanoski 5', 63'; Vakouftsis 43' (pen.)

Ta' Qali National Stadium, Ta' Qali
Attendance: 369
Referee: Stefano Podeschi (San Marino)

Omonia won 6–0 on aggregate.

14 July 2005
20:45

Domagnano (San Marino)	0–5	(Slovenia) Domžale
	Report	Stevanovič 15'; Zavrl 48'; Nikezić 69', 86'; Kačičnik 81'

Stadio Olimpico, Serravalle
Attendance: 1,000
Referee: Zohrab Gadiyev (Azerbaijan)
28 July 2005
17:30

Domžale (Slovenia)	3–0	(San Marino) Domagnano
Juninho 25'; Nikezić 46'; Zeljkovič 88' (pen.)	Report

Sports Park, Domžale
Attendance: 652
Referee: Sokol Jareci (Albania)

Domžale won 8–0 on aggregate.

=== Central–East region ===
14 July 2005
20:00

Ferencváros (Hungary)	0–2	(Belarus) MTZ-RIPO Minsk
	Report	Mkhitaryan 38'; Tarashchyk 90+3'

Stadion Üllői Út, Budapest
Attendance: 4,926
Referee: Novo Panić (Bosnia and Herzegovina)
28 July 2005
16:00

MTZ-RIPO Minsk (Belarus)	1–2	(Hungary) Ferencváros
Kontsevoy 48'	Report	Lipcsei 45'; Rósa 90'

Traktor Stadium, Minsk
Attendance: 9,000
Referee: Richard Havrilla (Slovakia)

MTZ-RIPO Minsk won 3–2 on aggregate.

14 July 2005
16:00

Banants (Armenia)	2–3	(Georgia (country)) Locomotive Tbilisi
Hakobyan 82'; Gharabaghtsyan 89'	Report	Alaverdashvili 41'; Kebadze 48'; Oniani 53' (pen.)

Hanrapetakan Stadium, Yerevan
Attendance: 2,150
Referee: János Megyebíró (Hungary)
28 July 2005
16:00

Locomotive Tbilisi (Georgia (country))	0–2	(Armenia) Banants
	Report	Hakobyan 22'; Khachatryan 81'

Mikheil Meskhi Stadium, Tbilisi
Attendance: 1,200
Referee: Marijo Strahonja (Croatia)

Banants won 4–3 on aggregate.

14 July 2005
16:00

Torpedo Kutaisi (Georgia (country))	0–1	(Belarus) BATE Borisov
	Report	Baha 26' (pen.)

Mikheil Meskhi Stadium, Tbilisi
Attendance: 800
Referee: Svein Oddvar Moen (Norway)
28 July 2005
19:00

BATE Borisov (Belarus)	5–0	(Georgia (country)) Torpedo Kutaisi
Molosh 10'; Lebedzew 21', 36'; Rubnenko 38', 43'	Report

City Stadium, Borisov
Attendance: 3,900
Referee: Galin Moskalev (Bulgaria)

BATE Borisov won 6–0 on aggregate.

14 July 2005
19:30

Vaduz (Liechtenstein)	2–0	(Moldova) Dacia Chișinău
Gohouri 53'; Gaspar 71'	Report

Rheinpark Stadion, Vaduz
Attendance: 850
Referee: Lassin Isaksen (Faroe Islands)
28 July 2005
17:30

Dacia Chișinău (Moldova)	1–0	(Liechtenstein) Vaduz
Japalau 63'	Report

Stadionul Republican, Chişinău
Attendance: 4,000
Referee: Emil Laursen (Denmark)

Vaduz won 2–1 on aggregate.

14 July 2005
19:30

Baku (Azerbaijan)	1–0	(Slovakia) Žilina
Sultanov 78'	Report

Tofik Bakhramov Stadium, Baku
Attendance: 3,400
Referee: Metin Aydogan (Turkey)
28 July 2005
20:00

Žilina (Slovakia)	3–1	(Azerbaijan) Baku
Straka 7'; Čišovský 38'; Labant 85'	Report	Štolcers 68'

Štadión pod Dubňom, Žilina
Attendance: 5,126
Referee: Ioannis Tsachilidis (Greece)

Žilina won 3–2 on aggregate.

14 July 2005
20:30

Mainz 05 (Germany)	4–0	(Armenia) Mika
Ruman 8'; Auer 36', 67'; Noveski 58'	Report

Commerzbank-Arena, Frankfurt
Attendance: 22,000
Referee: Per Ivar Staberg (Norway)
28 July 2005
16:30

Mika (Armenia)	0–0	(Germany) Mainz 05
	Report

Hanrapetakan Stadium, Yerevan
Attendance: 8,000
Referee: Dragomir Tanović (Serbia and Montenegro)

Mainz 05 won 4–0 on aggregate.

14 July 2005
18:00

Nistru Otaci (Moldova)	3–1	(Azerbaijan) Khazar Lankaran
Pancovici 12'; Mațiura 69' (pen.); Blajco 88'	Report	Ramazanov 25'

Stadionul Republican, Chişinău
Attendance: 3,000
Referee: Ismet Arzuman (Turkey)
28 July 2005
17:00

Khazar Lankaran (Azerbaijan)	1–2	(Moldova) Nistru Otaci
Aliyev 72'	Report	Lichioiu 19', 40'

Tofik Bakhramov Stadium, Baku
Attendance: 10,000
Referee: Alexandru Deaconu (Romania)

Nistru Otaci won 5–2 on aggregate.

=== Northern region ===
14 July 2005
20:30

Longford Town (Republic of Ireland)	2–0	(Wales) Carmarthen Town
Paisley 35'; Ferguson 54'	Report

Flancare Park, Longford
Attendance: 2,614
Referee: Pavel Olsiak (Slovakia)
28 July 2005
20:30

Carmarthen Town (Wales)	5–1	(Republic of Ireland) Longford Town
Thomas 15', 75'; Lloyd 49', 54' (pen.); Cotterrall 80'	Report	Myler 20'

Latham Park, Newtown
Attendance: 850
Referee: José Luis Mengual Prades (Andorra)

Carmarthen Town won 5–3 on aggregate.

14 July 2005
17:00

Ekranas (Lithuania)	0–2	(Republic of Ireland) Cork City
	Report	O'Donovan 25'; O'Callaghan 90'

Aukštaitija Stadium, Panevėžys
Attendance: 3,000
Referee: Mikko Vuorela (Finland)
28 July 2005
20:30

Cork City (Republic of Ireland)	0–1	(Lithuania) Ekranas
	Report	Klimavičius 60'

Turners Cross, Cork
Attendance: 5,200
Referee: Guido Wildhaber (Switzerland)

Cork City won 2–1 on aggregate.

14 July 2005
20:00

ÍBV (Iceland)	1–1	(Faroe Islands) B36
Sigurdsson 25'	Report	Midjord 7'

Hásteinsvöllur, Vestmannaeyjar
Attendance: 390
Referee: Adrian Mccourt (Northern Ireland)
28 July 2005
19:30

B36 (Faroe Islands)	2–1	(Iceland) ÍBV
Mørkøre 1'; Midjord 59'	Report	Jeffs 41'

Tórsvøllur, Tórshavn
Attendance: 4,100
Referee: Luc Wilmes (Luxembourg)

B36 won 3–2 on aggregate.

14 July 2005
17:30

Allianssi (Finland)	3–0	(Luxembourg) Pétange
Vajanne 34'; Cleaver 42'; Poulsen 85'	Report

Pohjola Stadion, Vantaa
Attendance: 1,709
Referee: Nebojsa Rabrenovic (Montenegro)
28 July 2005
18:30

Pétange (Luxembourg)	1–1	(Finland) Allianssi
Kefert 55'	Report	Poulsen 63'

Stade de la Frontière, Esch-sur-Alzette
Attendance: 717
Referee: Akmalkhan Kholmatov (Kazakhstan)

Allianssi won 4–1 on aggregate.

14 July 2005
20:45

Linfield (Northern Ireland)	1–0	(Latvia) Ventspils
Mouncey 6'	Report

Windsor Park, Belfast
Attendance: 1,600
Referee: Tomas Curin (Czech Republic)
28 July 2005
17:00

Ventspils (Latvia)	2–1	(Northern Ireland) Linfield
Rekhviashvili 39'; Rimkus 90+1'	Report	Thompson 8'

Ventspils Olimpiskais Stadions, Ventspils
Attendance: 1,900
Referee: Hristo Ristoskov (Bulgaria)

2–2 on aggregate; Linfield won on away goals.

14 July 2005
19:00

NSÍ (Faroe Islands)	0–3	(Latvia) Liepājas Metalurgs
	Report	Petersen 23' (o.g.); Karlsons 67'; Grebis 77'

Svangaskarð, Toftir
Attendance: 200
Referee: Jouni Hietala (Finland)
28 July 2005
18:00

Liepājas Metalurgs (Latvia)	3–0	(Faroe Islands) NSÍ
Dobrecovs 4', 35'; Kļava 81'	Report

Daugava Stadium, Liepāja
Attendance: 2,100
Referee: David McKeon (Republic of Ireland)

Liepājas Metalurgs won 6–0 on aggregate.

14 July 2005
18:30

Etzella Ettelbruck (Luxembourg)	0–4	(Iceland) Keflavík
	Report	Sveinsson 17', 59', 76', 80'

Stade Am Deich, Ettelbruck
Attendance: 839
Referee: Panayiotis Kailis (Cyprus)
28 July 2005
21:15

Keflavík (Iceland)	2–0	(Luxembourg) Etzella Ettelbruck
Sveinsson 76'; Kristinsson 84'	Report

Laugardalsvöllur, Reykjavík
Attendance: 835
Referee: Paulius Malžinskas (Lithuania)

Keflavík won 6–0 on aggregate.

14 July 2005
20:00

Portadown (Northern Ireland)	1–2	(Norway) Viking
Arkins 90+2' (pen.)	Report	Østenstad 52' (pen.); Kopteff 79'

Shamrock Park, Portadown
Attendance: 675
Referee: Igor Zakharov (Russia)
28 July 2005
19:00

Viking (Norway)	1–0	(Northern Ireland) Portadown
Nhleko 57'	Report

Viking Stadion, Stavanger
Attendance: 4,372
Referee: Claudio Circhetta (Switzerland)

Viking won 3–1 on aggregate.

14 July 2005
17:30

TVMK (Estonia)	1–1	(Finland) MYPA
Teever 37'	Report	Kuparinen 77'

Kadriorg Stadium, Tallinn
Attendance: 410
Referee: Jóhannes Valgeirsson (Iceland)
28 July 2005
17:00

MYPA (Finland)	1–0	(Estonia) TVMK
Rimas 57' (o.g.)	Report

Saviniemi, Anjalankoski
Attendance: 1,624
Referee: Mark Whitby (Wales)

MYPA won 2–1 on aggregate.

14 July 2005
20:30

Rhyl (Wales)	2–1	(Lithuania) Atlantas
Hunt 11', 70'	Report	Žvingilas 77'

Belle Vue, Rhyl
Attendance: 1,570
Referee: Cem Papila (Turkey)
28 July 2005
17:30

Atlantas (Lithuania)	3–2	(Wales) Rhyl
Laurišas 14' (pen.), 68'; Petreikis 78'	Report	Stones 33'; G. Powell 62'

Žalgiris Stadium, Klaipėda
Attendance: 1,800
Referee: Lasha Silagava (Georgia)

4–4 on aggregate; Rhyl won on away goals.

14 July 2005
19:00

Esbjerg (Denmark)	1–2	(Estonia) Flora
Berglund 90'	Report	Sirevičius 57'; Sidorenkov 60'

Esbjerg Idrætspark, Esbjerg
Attendance: 4,253
Referee: Thomas Einwaller (Austria)
28 July 2005
17:45

Flora (Estonia)	0–6	(Denmark) Esbjerg
	Report	Poulsen 15'; Kristiansen 16'; Berglund 23'; Andreasen 41'; Murcy 55', 86'

A. Le Coq Arena, Tallinn
Attendance: 1,000
Referee: Kevin Blom (Netherlands)

Esbjerg won 7–2 on aggregate.

== Second qualifying round ==
The draw for the second qualifying round was held on 29 July 2004.

=== Seeding ===
A total of 62 teams played in the first qualifying round: 37 teams which entered in this round, and 25 winners of the first round. Prior to the draw, UEFA divided the teams into three regions, with each region containing two groups of seeded and unseeded teams in accordance with the principles set by the Club Competitions Committee. Seeding of teams within each region was based on their 2005 UEFA club coefficients.

Southern–Mediterranean Group 1		Southern–Mediterranean Group 2	
Seeded	Unseeded	Seeded	Unseeded
(Serbia and Montenegro) Red Star Belgrade; (Israel) Maccabi Tel Aviv; (Romania) Dinamo București; (Israel) Maccabi Petah Tikva; (Serbia and Montenegro) OFK Beograd	(Bulgaria) Lokomotiv Plovdiv; (Croatia) Inter Zaprešić; (Cyprus) APOEL; (Cyprus) Omonia; (North Macedonia) Bashkimi	(Turkey) Beşiktaş; (Bulgaria) Levski Sofia; (Bulgaria) Litex Lovech; (Romania) Rapid București; (Israel) Ashdod; (Serbia and Montenegro) Zeta	(Croatia) Rijeka; (Slovenia) Publikum; (Slovenia) Domžale; (North Macedonia) Vardar; (Bosnia and Herzegovina) Široki Brijeg; (Liechtenstein) Vaduz
Central–East Group 1		Central–East Group 2	
Seeded	Unseeded	Seeded	Unseeded
Austria Wien; (Austria) GAK; (Switzerland) Grasshopper; (Ukraine) Metalurh Donetsk; (Russia) Krylia Sovetov Samara	(Poland) Wisła Płock; (Hungary) Sopron; (Slovakia) Žilina; (Moldova) Nistru Otaci; (Belarus) BATE Borisov	(Ukraine) Dnipro Dnipropetrovsk; (Russia) Zenit Saint Petersburg; (Czech Republic) Teplice; (Poland) Legia Warsaw; (Poland) Groclin Grodzisk Wielkopolski	(Austria) Superfund; (Switzerland) Zürich; (Slovakia) Dukla Banská Bystrica; (Belarus) MTZ-RIPO Minsk; (Armenia) Banants
Northern Group 1		Northern Group 2	
Seeded	Unseeded	Seeded	Unseeded
(Belgium) Genk; (Sweden) Halmstads BK; (Norway) Viking; (Denmark) Midtjylland; (Norway) Brann	(Latvia) Liepājas Metalurgs; (Finland) Allianssi; (Northern Ireland) Linfield; (Wales) Rhyl; (Faroe Islands) B36	(Germany) Mainz 05; (Denmark) Copenhagen; (Scotland) Dundee United; (Sweden) Djurgårdens IF; (Denmark) Esbjerg	(Norway) Tromsø; (Finland) MYPA; (Iceland) Keflavík; (Republic of Ireland) Cork City; (Wales) Carmarthen Town

=== Summary ===
Team 1	Agg.	Team 2	1st leg	2nd leg
Southern–Mediterranean region
Inter Zaprešić (Croatia)	1–7	(Serbia and Montenegro) Red Star Belgrade	1–3	0–4
Bashkimi (North Macedonia)	0–11	(Israel) Maccabi Petah Tikva	0–5	0–6
Dinamo București (Romania)	4–3	(Cyprus) Omonia	3–1	1–2
OFK Beograd (Serbia and Montenegro)	2–2 (a)	(Bulgaria) Lokomotiv Plovdiv	2–1	0–1
APOEL (Cyprus)	3–2	(Israel) Maccabi Tel Aviv	1–0	2–2 (a.e.t.)
Litex Lovech (Bulgaria)	2–2 (a)	(Croatia) Rijeka	1–0	1–2
Vaduz (Liechtenstein)	1–6	(Turkey) Beşiktaş	0–1	1–5
Rapid București (Romania)	4–1	(North Macedonia) Vardar	3–0	1–1
Publikum (Slovenia)	1–3	(Bulgaria) Levski Sofia	1–0	0–3
Zeta (Serbia and Montenegro)	2–5	(Bosnia and Herzegovina) Široki Brijeg	0–1	2–4
Ashdod (Israel)	3–3 (a)	(Slovenia) Domžale	2–2	1–1
Central–East region
Krylia Sovetov Samara (Russia)	4–0	(Belarus) BATE Borisov	2–0	2–0
Sopron (Hungary)	1–5	(Ukraine) Metalurh Donetsk	0–3	1–2
Grasshopper (Switzerland)	3–3 (a)	(Poland) Wisła Płock	1–0	2–3
Nistru Otaci (Moldova)	0–3	(Austria) GAK	0–2	0–1
Žilina (Slovakia)	3–4	Austria Wien	1–2	2–2
Superfund (Austria)	3–3 (a)	(Russia) Zenit Saint Petersburg	2–2	1–1
MTZ-RIPO Minsk (Belarus)	2–3	(Czech Republic) Teplice	1–1	1–2
Groclin Grodzisk Wielkopolski (Poland)	4–1	(Slovakia) Dukla Banská Bystrica	4–1	0–0
Banants (Armenia)	2–8	(Ukraine) Dnipro Dnipropetrovsk	2–4	0–4
Legia Warsaw (Poland)	1–5	(Switzerland) Zürich	0–1	1–4
Northern region
Halmstads BK (Sweden)	5–3	(Northern Ireland) Linfield	1–1	4–2
Midtjylland (Denmark)	4–3	(Faroe Islands) B36	2–1	2–2
Brann (Norway)	2–0	(Finland) Allianssi	0–0	2–0
Liepājas Metalurgs (Latvia)	2–6	(Belgium) Genk	2–3	0–3
Rhyl (Wales)	1–3	(Norway) Viking	0–1	1–2
MYPA (Finland)	2–2 (a)	(Scotland) Dundee United	0–0	2–2
Copenhagen (Denmark)	4–0	(Wales) Carmarthen Town	2–0	2–0
Mainz 05 (Germany)	4–0	(Iceland) Keflavík	2–0	2–0
Djurgårdens IF (Sweden)	1–1 (a)	(Republic of Ireland) Cork City	1–1	0–0
Esbjerg (Denmark)	1–1 (2–3 p)	(Norway) Tromsø	0–1	1–0 (a.e.t.)

=== Southern–Mediterranean region ===
11 August 2005
17:30

Inter Zaprešić (Croatia)	1–3	(Serbia and Montenegro) Red Star Belgrade
Pecelj 41'	Report	Žigić 20', 49'; Pantelić 80'

Stadion ŠRC Zaprešić, Zaprešić
Attendance: 3,050
Referee: Joaquim da Silva (Portugal)
25 August 2005
20:15

Red Star Belgrade (Serbia and Montenegro)	4–0	(Croatia) Inter Zaprešić
Janković 6'; Pantelić 41', 85'; Žigić 45'	Report

Red Star Stadium, Belgrade
Attendance: 28,901
Referee: Hervé Piccirillo (France)

Red Star Belgrade won 7–1 on aggregate.

11 August 2005
20:00

Bashkimi (North Macedonia)	0–5	(Israel) Maccabi Petah Tikva
	Report	Megamadov 5'; Tuama 13'; Mashiah 22' (pen.); Edri 70'; Sarsour 90'

Gradski stadion, Skopje
Attendance: 1,500
Referee: Robert Krajnc (Slovenia)
25 August 2005
17:00

Maccabi Petah Tikva (Israel)	6–0	(North Macedonia) Bashkimi
Golan 6', 40', 89'; Ganon 42'; Sarsour 63', 67'	Report

Ramat Gan Stadium, Ramat Gan (Note: Maccabi Petah Tikva played their home matches at Ramat Gan Stadium in Tel Aviv District instead of their regular stadium, Municipal Stadium, Petah Tikva.)
Attendance: 1,000
Referee: Marian Salomir (Romania)

Maccabi Petah Tikva won 11–0 on aggregate.

11 August 2005
20:45

Dinamo București (Romania)	3–1	(Cyprus) Omonia
Munteanu 12' (pen.); Zicu 25', 44'	Report	Konnafis 4'

Stadionul Dinamo, Bucharest
Attendance: 7,000
Referee: Alfonso Pérez Burrull (Spain)
25 August 2005
19:30

Omonia (Cyprus)	2–1	(Romania) Dinamo București
Kaiafas 29'; Christou 31'	Report	Niculescu 55'

GSP Stadium, Nicosia
Attendance: 12,000
Referee: Igor Zakharov (Russia)

Dinamo București won 4–3 on aggregate.

11 August 2005
17:30

OFK Beograd (Serbia and Montenegro)	2–1	(Bulgaria) Lokomotiv Plovdiv
Kirovski 32'; Ivanović 39'	Report	Kamburov 55'

Omladinski Stadium, Belgrade
Attendance: 800
Referee: Paolo Dondarini (Italy)
25 August 2005
20:00

Lokomotiv Plovdiv (Bulgaria)	1–0	(Serbia and Montenegro) OFK Beograd
Stoynev 76'	Report

Lazur Stadium, Burgas
Attendance: 8,100
Referee: Cem Papila (Turkey)

2–2 on aggregate; Lokomotiv Plovdiv won on away goals.

11 August 2005
19:45

APOEL (Cyprus)	1–0	(Israel) Maccabi Tel Aviv
Neophytou 65'	Report

GSP Stadium, Nicosia
Attendance: 10,573
Referee: Siniša Zrnić (Bosnia and Herzegovina)
25 August 2005
19:00

Maccabi Tel Aviv (Israel)	2–2 (a.e.t.)	(Cyprus) APOEL
Nimni 63'; Mesika 117'	Report	Makrides 93'; Neophytou 96'

Bloomfield Stadium, Tel Aviv
Attendance: 7,200
Referee: René Rogalla (Switzerland)

APOEL won 3–2 on aggregate.

11 August 2005
19:30

Litex Lovech (Bulgaria)	1–0	(Croatia) Rijeka
Zhelev 83'	Report

Lovech Stadium, Lovech
Attendance: 1,660
Referee: Joeri Van De Velde (Belgium)
25 August 2005
18:00

Rijeka (Croatia)	2–1	(Bulgaria) Litex Lovech
Krpan 64'; Rendulić 90+3'	Report	Caillet 44' (pen.)

Stadion Kantrida, Rijeka
Attendance: 4,876
Referee: Michael Svendsen (Denmark)

2–2 on aggregate; Litex Lovech won on away goals.

11 August 2005
19:30

Vaduz (Liechtenstein)	0–1	(Turkey) Beşiktaş
	Report	Buruk 12'

Rheinpark Stadion, Vaduz
Attendance: 2,650
Referee: Ivan Bebek (Croatia)
25 August 2005
20:00

Beşiktaş (Turkey)	5–1	(Liechtenstein) Vaduz
Aílton 35'; Hassan 61'; Dursun 83' (pen.); Dursun 89'; Pancu 90+2'	Report	Gaspar 28'

BJK İnönü Stadium, Istanbul
Attendance: 15,120
Referee: Igor Egorov (Russia)

Beşiktaş won 6–1 on aggregate.

11 August 2005
19:00

Rapid București (Romania)	3–0	(North Macedonia) Vardar
Niculae 44', 50'; Măldărăşanu 67'	Report

Stadionul Giuleşti-Valentin Stănescu, Bucharest
Attendance: 8,000
Referee: Brage Sandmoen (Norway)
25 August 2005
19:00

Vardar (North Macedonia)	1–1	(Romania) Rapid București
Naumov 40'	Report	Vasilache 59'

Gradski stadion, Skopje
Attendance: 1,500
Referee: Janos Megyebiro (Hungary)

Rapid București won 4–1 on aggregate.

11 August 2005
20:30

Publikum (Slovenia)	1–0	(Bulgaria) Levski Sofia
Beršnjak 68'	Report

Arena Petrol, Celje
Attendance: 1,500
Referee: Khagani Mamedov (Azerbaijan)
25 August 2005
19:15

Levski Sofia (Bulgaria)	3–0	(Slovenia) Publikum
Yovov 41', 64'; Domovchiyski 69'	Report

Georgi Asparuhov Stadium, Sofia
Attendance: 7,958
Referee: Costas Theodotou (Cyprus)

Levski Sofia won 3–1 on aggregate.

11 August 2005
20:00

Zeta (Serbia and Montenegro)	0–1	(Bosnia and Herzegovina) Široki Brijeg
	Report	Erceg 90+2'

Stadion Pod Goricom, Podgorica
Attendance: 3,500
Referee: Sorin Corpodean (Romania)
25 August 2005
20:15

Široki Brijeg (Bosnia and Herzegovina)	4–2	(Serbia and Montenegro) Zeta
Lukačević 16'; Juričić 18'; Roni 26'; Bubalo 64'	Report	Vuković 4', 44'

Stadion Pecara, Široki Brijeg
Attendance: 5,000
Referee: Meir Levi (Israel)

Široki Brijeg won 5–2 on aggregate.

11 August 2005
18:00

Ashdod (Israel)	2–2	(Slovenia) Domžale
Rajović 18'; Dika Dika 34'	Report	Stevanovič 2'; Jhonnes 25'

Bloomfield Stadium, Tel Aviv
Attendance: 2,242
Referee: Dejan Stanišic (Serbia and Montenegro)
25 August 2005
17:00

Domžale (Slovenia)	1–1	(Israel) Ashdod
Nikezić 90+3'	Report	Ebiede 70'

Domžale Sports Park, Domžale
Attendance: 2,788
Referee: Ioannis Tsachilidis (Greece)

3–3 on aggregate; Domžale won on away goals.

=== Central–East region ===
11 August 2005
17:00

Krylia Sovetov Samara (Russia)	2–0	(Belarus) BATE Borisov
Adamu 8'; Husin 76' (pen.)	Report

Metallurg Stadium, Samara
Attendance: 15,065
Referee: Carlo Bertolini (Switzerland)
25 August 2005
20:00

BATE Borisov (Belarus)	0–2	(Russia) Krylia Sovetov Samara
	Report	Bulyga 5'; Vinogradov 50'

City Stadium, Borisov
Attendance: 4,960
Referee: Sašo Lazarevski (Macedonia)

Krylia Sovetov Samara won 4–0 on aggregate.

11 August 2005
20:30

Sopron (Hungary)	0–3	(Ukraine) Metalurh Donetsk
	Report	Shyshchenko 52'; Oleksienko 87', 90'

Stadion Városi, Sopron
Attendance: 4,000
Referee: Karen Nalbandyan (Armenia)
25 August 2005
18:00

Metalurh Donetsk (Ukraine)	2–1	(Hungary) Sopron
Zotov 56'; Oleksienko 90' (pen.)	Report	Florea 88' (o.g.)

Shakhtar Stadium, Donetsk
Attendance: 12,000
Referee: Michael Ross (Northern Ireland)

Metalurh Donetsk won 5–1 on aggregate.

11 August 2005
19:30

Grasshopper (Switzerland)	1–0	(Poland) Wisła Płock
Eduardo 68'	Report

Hardturm, Zürich
Attendance: 3,600
Referee: Duarte Gomes (Portugal)
25 August 2005
18:00

Wisła Płock (Poland)	3–2	(Switzerland) Grasshopper
Gęsior 35', 38'; Zilić 69'	Report	António 30'; Eduardo 83'

Kazimierz Górski Stadium, Płock
Attendance: 6,000
Referee: Egill Mar Markusson (Iceland)

3–3 on aggregate; Grasshopper won on away goals.

11 August 2005
17:30

Nistru Otaci (Moldova)	0–2	(Austria) GAK
	Report	Schrott 54'; Ehmann 57'

Stadionul Republican, Chişinău
Attendance: 4,000
Referee: Miroslaw Ryszka (Poland)
25 August 2005
20:15

GAK (Austria)	1–0	(Moldova) Nistru Otaci
Junuzović 33'	Report

Liebenauer Stadium, Graz
Attendance: 4,859
Referee: Albano Janku (Albania)

GAK won 3–0 on aggregate.

11 August 2005
20:15

Žilina (Slovakia)	1–2	Austria Wien
Bartoš 40'	Report	Šebo 90+1'; Linz 90+3'

Štadión pod Dubňom, Žilina
Attendance: 5,483
Referee: Petteri Kari (Finland)
25 August 2005
20:15

Austria Wien	2–2	(Slovakia) Žilina
Linz 65', 70'	Report	Čišovský 26'; Gottwald 31'

Franz Horr Stadium, Vienna
Attendance: 5,600
Referee: Sten Kaldma (Estonia)

Austria Wien won 4–3 on aggregate.

11 August 2005
20:45

Superfund (Austria)	2–2	(Russia) Zenit Saint Petersburg
Chaile 33'; Wisio 87'	Report	Kerzhakov 15'; Arshavin 73'

Waldstadion, Pasching
Attendance: 4,200
Referee: Pieter Vink (Netherlands)
25 August 2005
18:00

Zenit Saint Petersburg (Russia)	1–1	(Austria) Superfund
Spivak 11' (pen.)	Report	Gilewicz 88'

Petrovsky Stadium, Saint Petersburg
Attendance: 21,750
Referee: Mike Dean (England)

3–3 on aggregate; Zenit Saint Petersburg won on away goals.

11 August 2005
17:00

MTZ-RIPO Minsk (Belarus)	1–1	(Czech Republic) Teplice
Kontsevoy 70'	Report	Rilke 34'

Traktor Stadium, Minsk
Attendance: 8,500
Referee: Asaf Kenan (Israel)
25 August 2005
17:00

Teplice (Czech Republic)	2–1	(Belarus) MTZ-RIPO Minsk
Rilke 55'; Mašek 90+2'	Report	Mkhitaryan 70'

Na Stínadlech, Teplice
Attendance: 4,025
Referee: Stefan Johannesson (Sweden)

Teplice won 3–2 on aggregate.

11 August 2005
18:00

Groclin Grodzisk Wielkopolski (Poland)	4–1	(Slovakia) Dukla Banská Bystrica
Rocki 46'; Wozniak 56' (o.g.); Porázik 68'; Ślusarski 83'	Report	Bazík 72'

Dyskobolia Stadium, Grodzisk Wielkopolski
Attendance: 2,100
Referee: Drago Kos (Slovenia)
25 August 2005
18:00

Dukla Banská Bystrica (Slovakia)	0–0	(Poland) Groclin Grodzisk Wielkopolski
	Report

SNP Stadium, Banská Bystrica
Attendance: 3,150
Referee: Iain Brines (Scotland)

Groclin Grodzisk Wielkopolski won 4–1 on aggregate.

11 August 2005
16:00

Banants (Armenia)	2–4	(Ukraine) Dnipro Dnipropetrovsk
Hakobyan 24', 43'	Report	Yezerskiy 49'; Kornilenko 82', 83'; Balabanov 85'

Republican Stadium, Yerevan
Attendance: 7,000
Referee: Novo Panić (Bosnia and Herzegovina)
25 August 2005
18:00

Dnipro Dnipropetrovsk (Ukraine)	4–0	(Armenia) Banants
Shelayev 10' (pen.), 45'; Rykun 32'; Balabanov 70'	Report

Stadium Meteor, Dnipropetrovsk
Attendance: 5,000
Referee: Milan Šedivý (Slovakia)

Dnipro Dnipropetrovsk won 8–2 on aggregate.

11 August 2005
18:00

Legia Warsaw (Poland)	0–1	(Switzerland) Zürich
	Report	Raffael 90+1'

Polish Army Stadium, Warsaw
Attendance: 6,000
Referee: Pasquale Rodomonti (Italy)
25 August 2005
20:00

Zürich (Switzerland)	4–1	(Poland) Legia Warsaw
Keita 25', 64'; Džemaili 29'; Cesar 78' (pen.)	Report	Szałachowski 18'

Letzigrund, Zürich
Attendance: 9,600
Referee: Howard Webb (England)

Zürich won 5–1 on aggregate.

=== Northern region ===
11 August 2005
19:00

Halmstads BK (Sweden)	1–1	(Northern Ireland) Linfield
Johansson 32'	Report	Kearney 72'

Örjans Vall, Halmstad
Attendance: 1,197
Referee: Siarhei Shmolik (Belarus)
25 August 2005
20:45

Linfield (Northern Ireland)	2–4	(Sweden) Halmstads BK
Mouncey 54'; Ferguson 82'	Report	Þorvaldsson 9'; Jönsson 33'; Preko 45'; Djurić 74'

Windsor Park, Belfast
Attendance: 4,052
Referee: Alojzije Supraha (Croatia)

Halmstads BK won 5–3 on aggregate.

11 August 2005
18:00

Midtjylland (Denmark)	2–1	(Faroe Islands) B36
Kristensen 39', 71'	Report	Højsted 79'

SAS Arena, Herning
Attendance: 3,819
Referee: Brian Lawlor (Wales)
25 August 2005
18:00

B36 (Faroe Islands)	2–2	(Denmark) Midtjylland
Midjord 5'; Mørkøre 85'	Report	Pimpong 17'; Sørensen 35'

Tórsvøllur, Tórshavn
Attendance: 1,300
Referee: Petteri Kari (Finland)

Midtjylland won 4–3 on aggregate.

11 August 2005
19:00

Brann (Norway)	0–0	(Finland) Allianssi
	Report

Brann Stadion, Bergen
Attendance: 2,597
Referee: Ihor Ishchenko (Ukraine)
25 August 2005
20:00

Allianssi (Finland)	0–2	(Norway) Brann
	Report	Ludvigsen 58'; Miller 88'

ISS Stadion, Vantaa
Attendance: 1,372
Referee: David Malcolm (Northern Ireland)

Brann won 2–0 on aggregate.

11 August 2005
18:00

Liepājas Metalurgs (Latvia)	2–3	(Belgium) Genk
Kalonas 16'; Dobrecovs 83' (pen.)	Report	Vandenbergh 47'; Daerden 59'; Stojanović 81'

Daugava Stadium, Liepāja
Attendance: 1,899
Referee: Per Ivar Staberg (Norway)
25 August 2005
20:45

Genk (Belgium)	3–0	(Latvia) Liepājas Metalurgs
Vandenbergh 6'; Daerden 18'; Stojanović 28'	Report

Cristal Arena, Genk
Attendance: 6,000
Referee: Dietmar Drabek (Austria)

Genk won 6–2 on aggregate.

11 August 2005
20:00

Rhyl (Wales)	0–1	(Norway) Viking
	Report	Kopteff 19'

Belle Vue, Rhyl
Attendance: 1,540
Referee: Johannes Valgeirsson (Iceland)
25 August 2005
19:00

Viking (Norway)	2–1	(Wales) Rhyl
Nhleko 8', 26'	Report	Adamson 36'

Viking Stadion, Stavanger
Attendance: 3,867
Referee: Aleh Chykun (Belarus)

Viking won 3–1 on aggregate.

11 August 2005
19:30

MYPA (Finland)	0–0	(Scotland) Dundee United
	Report

Saviniemi, Anjalankoski
Attendance: 3,000
Referee: Dragomir Tanović (Serbia and Montenegro)
25 August 2005
20:45

Dundee United (Scotland)	2–2	(Finland) MYPA
Kerr 14'; Samuel 28'	Report	Adriano 72' (pen.), 80'

Tannadice Park, Dundee
Attendance: 9,400
Referee: Bernardino González Vázquez (Spain)

2–2 on aggregate; MYPA won on away goals.

11 August 2005
20:15

Copenhagen (Denmark)	2–0	(Wales) Carmarthen Town
Álvaro 48'; Gravgaard 55'	Report

Parken Stadium, Copenhagen
Attendance: 11,399
Referee: Joseph Attard (Malta)
25 August 2005
20:30

Carmarthen Town (Wales)	0–2	(Denmark) Copenhagen
	Report	Møller 38', 40'

Ninian Park, Cardiff
Attendance: 882
Referee: Ghenadie Orlic (Moldova)

Copenhagen won 4–0 on aggregate.

11 August 2005
20:30

Mainz 05 (Germany)	2–0	(Iceland) Keflavík
Auer 10'; Babatz 70' (pen.)	Report

Commerzbank-Arena, Frankfurt
Attendance: 18,100
Referee: Mustafa Çulcu (Turkey)
25 August 2005
21:15

Keflavík (Iceland)	0–2	(Germany) Mainz 05
	Report	Thurk 25'; Geißler 85'

Laugardalsvöllur, Reykjavík
Attendance: 880
Referee: Bruno Derrien (France)

Mainz 05 won 4–0 on aggregate.

11 August 2005
19:00

Djurgårdens IF (Sweden)	1–1	(Republic of Ireland) Cork City
Murphy 81' (o.g.)	Report	Fenn 8'

Råsunda Stadium, Solna
Attendance: 4,854
Referee: Oleh Oriekhov (Ukraine)
25 August 2005
20:30

Cork City (Republic of Ireland)	0–0	(Sweden) Djurgårdens IF
	Report

Turners Cross, Cork
Attendance: 5,400
Referee: Luc Wilmes (Luxembourg)

1–1 on aggregate; Cork City won on away goals.

11 August 2005
19:00

Esbjerg (Denmark)	0–1	(Norway) Tromsø
	Report	Strand 10'

Esbjerg Idrætspark, Esbjerg
Attendance: 3,749
Referee: Peter Vervecken (Belgium)
25 August 2005
19:00

Tromsø (Norway)	0–1 (a.e.t.)	(Denmark) Esbjerg
	Report	Lucena 17'
Penalties
Bernier (penalty missed); Normann (penalty scored); Nilsen (penalty scored); Strand (penalty missed); Årst (penalty missed); Ademolu (penalty scored)	3–2	(penalty scored) Poulsen; (penalty scored) Høgh; (penalty missed) Kristiansen; (penalty missed) Hansen; (penalty missed) Andreasen; (penalty missed) Berglund

Alfheim Stadion, Tromsø
Attendance: 4,380
Referee: Knut Kircher (Germany)

1–1 on aggregate; Tromsø won 3–2 on penalties.
