= 2006–07 Slovenian Football Cup =

Tournament details
- Country: Slovenia
- Teams: 31

Final positions
- Champions: Koper (2nd title)
- Runners-up: Maribor

Tournament statistics
- Matches played: 32
- Goals scored: 106 (3.31 per match)
- Top goal scorer(s): Miloš Đerić; Dalibor Volaš; Dimitar Makriev (5 goals each)

The 2006–07 Slovenian Football Cup was the 16th season of the Slovenian Football Cup, Slovenia's football knockout competition. 20 lower league teams played in the first two rounds and the Slovenian PrvaLiga teams joined in the round of 16.

Koper, who were the defending champions having won the cup for the first time since the breakup of Yugoslavia in the previous season, won the title for the second time after defeating Maribor 1–0 in the final.

== Qualified clubs ==
=== 2006–07 Slovenian PrvaLiga members ===
The 10 teams from the 2006–07 Slovenian PrvaLiga (Bela Krajina, Celje, Domžale, Drava Ptuj, Factor, Gorica, Koper, Maribor, Nafta Lendava and Primorje) as well as Rudar Velenje entered in the third round.

=== Qualified through MNZ Regional Cups ===
Teams that qualified from the regional cups entered the first round. These were: Zagorje, Svoboda Kisovec and Ihan (MNZ Ljubljana); Malečnik, Pohorje and Paloma (MNZ Maribor); Mons Claudius and Krško (MNZ Celje); Postojna and Bonifika (MNZ Koper); Adria and Brda (MNZ Nova Gorica); Veržej and Mura 05 (MNZ Murska Sobota); Črenšovci and Renkovci (MNZ Lendava); Zarica and Lesce (MNZ Kranj); Stojnci and Zavrč (MNZ Ptuj).

== First round ==
The first round matches took place on 23 August 2006.

23 August 2006	Veržej	3–2	Paloma	Veržej
16:30 CEST	Časar 25', 58'; Vidmar 34'	Report	Žabota 56', 65'	Stadium: Čistina; Attendance: 50; Referee: Miran Bukovec

23 August 2006	Renkovci	1–2	Malečnik	Renkovci
16:30 CEST	Casar 45'	Report	Trstenjak 10'; Laznik 30' (pen.)	Stadium: Renkovci Football Field; Attendance: 50; Referee: Andrej Tratnjek

23 August 2006	Mons Claudius	2–6	Pohorje	Rogatec
16:30 CEST	Habjan 10' (pen.); Lamut 47' (o.g.)	Report	Magdič 36'; Valenti 51', 60', 76', 90'; Fras 86'	Stadium: Rogatec Sports Centre; Attendance: 60; Referee: Roman Glažar

23 August 2006	Mura 05	3–0	Zavrč	Murska Sobota
16:30 CEST	Žilavec 27'; Fajfar 66'; Slavic 84'	Report		Stadium: Fazanerija; Attendance: 200; Referee: Emir Huselja

23 August 2006	Črenšovci	2–0	Stojnci	Črenšovci
16:30 CEST	Virag 19'; Antolin 86'	Report		Stadium: Črenšovci Sports Park; Attendance: 50; Referee: Gregor Gostenčnik

23 August 2006	Postojna	1–2	Svoboda Kisovec	Postojna
16:30 CEST				Stadium: Postojna Sports Park

23 August 2006	Zagorje	1–0	Adria	Zagorje ob Savi
16:30 CEST	Božičić 30'	Report		Stadium: Zagorje City Stadium; Attendance: 60; Referee: Jože Vehar

23 August 2006	Ihan	1–0	Krško	Ihan
16:30 CEST	Čavušević 65'	Report		Stadium: Ihan Sports Park; Attendance: 50; Referee: Vojko Goričan

23 August 2006	Zarica	2–3	Brda	Kranj
16:30 CEST	Štojs 45'; Žinič 88'	Report	Črnigoj 31'; Đerić 36'; Fikfak 65' (pen.)	Stadium: Zarica Sports Park; Attendance: 60; Referee: Janez Babnik

23 August 2006	Bonifika	2–0	Lesce	Ljubljana
19:00 CEST	Hrvatin 53'; Valenčič 70'	Report		Stadium: Bežigrad Stadium; Attendance: 80; Referee: Davor Drečnik

== Second round ==
The second round matches took place on 5 and 6 September 2006.

5 September 2006	Svoboda Kisovec	1–6	Bonifika	Kisovec
16:00 CEST	Gracer 11'	Report	Campellone 21', 50'; Šestić 32'; Valenčič 41'; Božič 58'; Volaš 81'	Stadium: Kisovec Sports Park; Attendance: 80; Referee: Slavko Vinčić

5 September 2006	Pohorje	0–1	Zagorje	Ruše
16:00 CEST		Report	Mimić 53'	Stadium: NK Pohorje Stadium; Attendance: 90; Referee: Sašo Habjanič

6 September 2006	Črenšovci	1–0	Veržej	Črenšovci
16:00 CEST	Forjan 30'	Report		Stadium: Črenšovci Sports Park; Attendance: 150; Referee: Aleš Partlič

6 September 2006	Mura 05	2–0	Malečnik	Murska Sobota
16:00 CEST	Žilavec 5'; Slavic 71'	Report		Stadium: Fazanerija; Attendance: 300; Referee: Drago Klinc

6 September 2006	Brda	2–0	Ihan	Dobrovo
16:00 CEST	Đerić 43', 57'	Report		Stadium: Vipolže Stadium; Attendance: 40; Referee: Roberto Ponis

== Round of 16 ==
The round of 16 matches took place on 20 September 2006.

20 September 2006	Bonifika	1–3	Gorica	Koper
15:00 CEST	Rajčević 72'	Report	Nikezić 7'; Šturm 15'; Ranić 90'	Stadium: Bonifika Stadium; Attendance: 150; Referee: Jože Vehar

20 September 2006	Brda	3–5	Rudar Velenje	Dobrovo
16:30 CEST	Fikfak 14'; Đerić 35', 44'	Report	Agić 28', 74', 88'; Muharemović 31'; Lalović 34'	Stadium: Vipolže Stadium; Attendance: 30; Referee: Tomislav Horvat

20 September 2006	Črenšovci	0–2	Maribor	Črenšovci
17:00 CEST		Report	Robnik 17'; Pekič 86'	Stadium: Črenšovci Sports Park; Attendance: 400; Referee: Emir Huselja

20 September 2006	Zagorje	1–3	Koper	Zagorje ob Savi
17:00 CEST	Božičić 24'	Report	Drobne 10', 14', 34'	Stadium: Zagorje City Stadium; Attendance: 75; Referee: Boris Jeneš

20 September 2006	Nafta	2–1	Factor	Lendava
17:00 CEST	Eterović 37', 51'	Report	Ihbeisheh 74'	Stadium: Lendava Sports Park; Attendance: 500; Referee: Darko Čeferin

20 September 2006	Bela Krajina	1–2	Mura 05	Črnomelj
15:00 CEST	Žagar 90'	Report	Žilavec 19'; Prettner 86'	Stadium: Loka Stadium; Attendance: 300; Referee: Roberto Ponis

20 September 2006	Celje	2–1	Drava Ptuj	Celje
18:00 CEST	Pečnik 15'; Beršnjak 84'	Report	Tisnikar 40'	Stadium: Arena Petrol; Attendance: 700; Referee: Boris Tošeski

20 September 2006	Domžale	1–2	Primorje	Domžale
18:00 CEST	Varga 90'	Report	Zatkovič 35', 67'	Stadium: Sports Park; Attendance: 800; Referee: Damir Skomina

== Quarter-finals ==
The quarter-finals took place on 25 October 2006.

25 October 2006	Mura 05	0–2	Gorica	Murska Sobota
14:30 CEST		Report	Matavž 66'; Šturm 86'	Stadium: Fazanerija; Attendance: 800; Referee: Gregor Gostenčnik

25 October 2006	Celje	3–1	Nafta Lendava	Celje
18:00 CEST	Beršnjak 40'; Urbanč 64'; Pečnik 72'	Report	Pavlović 27'	Stadium: Arena Petrol; Attendance: 800; Referee: Robert Krajnc

25 October 2006	Maribor	4–0	Primorje	Maribor
14:00 CEST	Pekič 1'; Mihelič 13'; Makriev 38', 55'	Report		Stadium: Ljudski vrt Attendance: 2,500; Referee: Boris Tošeski

25 October 2006	Rudar Velenje	1–1 (a.e.t.) (4–5 p)	Koper	Velenje
18:00 CEST	Rajković 8'	Report	Nilton 20'	Stadium: Ob Jezeru; Attendance: 250; Referee: Matej Jug
	Penalties
	Jeseničnik (penalty scored); Hudarin (penalty scored); Kraljevič (penalty scored); Jelen (penalty scored)		(penalty scored) Lazič; (penalty scored) Puš; (penalty scored) Mejač; (penalty scored) Lovrečič; (penalty scored) Zahora

== Semi-finals ==
The first legs of the semi-finals took place on 25 April, and the second legs took place on 9 May 2007.

=== First legs ===
25 April 2007	Gorica	2–4	Maribor	Nova Gorica
19:00 CEST	Nikezić 22'; Matavž 71'	Report	Makriev 4', 38', 60'; Pekič 45'	Stadium: Sports Park; Attendance: 850; Referee: Darko Čeferin

25 April 2007	Celje	1–3	Koper	Celje
20:00 CEST	Čadikovski 76'	Report	Božič 37'; Nilton 49'; Volaš 55'	Stadium: Arena Petrol; Attendance: 1,000; Referee: Robert Krajnc

=== Second legs ===
9 May 2007	Koper	4–1 (7–2 agg.)	Celje	Koper
17:00 CEST	Volaš 21', 50', 54'; Nilton 26'	Report	Pečnik 77'	Stadium: Bonifika Stadium; Attendance: 700; Referee: Matej Jug

9 May 2007	Maribor	1–1 (5–3 agg.)	Gorica	Maribor
17:00 CEST	Pekič 28'	Report	Kršić 50' (pen.)	Stadium: Ljudski vrt Attendance: 1,500; Referee: Davor Drečnik

== Final ==
In the final on 22 May 2007, Aleksander Rajčević scored the only goal of the game as Koper defeated Maribor 1–0 and successfully defended the title they had won in the previous season. It was the second time since Slovenia gained independence from Yugoslavia that Koper had won the cup.

22 May 2007
20:45 CEST

Koper	1–0	Maribor
Rajčević 80'	Report

Arena Petrol, Celje
Attendance: 3,500
Referee: Robert Krajnc
