= 2004–05 UEFA Champions League qualifying rounds =

European football tournament

The qualifying rounds for the 2004–05 UEFA Champions League began on 13 July 2004. In total, there were three qualifying rounds which provided 16 clubs to join the group stage.

Times are CEST (UTC+2), as listed by UEFA.

== Teams ==
Key to colours
Qualify for the group stage
Eliminated in the Third qualifying round; Advanced to the UEFA Cup first round

Third qualifying round
Team	Coeff.
(Spain) Real Madrid	146.351
(England) Manchester United	119.510
(Spain) Deportivo La Coruña	104.351
(England) Liverpool	90.510
(Italy) Juventus	84.531
(Italy) Internazionale	82.531
(Netherlands) PSV Eindhoven	65.246
(Germany) Bayer Leverkusen	62.331
(France) Monaco	51.947
(Belgium) Anderlecht	49.529
(Scotland) Rangers	42.601
(Greece) PAOK	41.467
(Ukraine) Dynamo Kyiv	41.301
(Portugal) Benfica	29.970
(Switzerland) Basel	25.384
(Austria) GAK	19.971
(Israel) Maccabi Haifa	19.012
(Czech Republic) Baník Ostrava	10.915

Second qualifying round
Team	Coeff.
(Czech Republic) Sparta Prague	54.915
(Belgium) Club Brugge	43.529
(Norway) Rosenborg	42.227
(Poland) Wisła Kraków	31.177
(Serbia and Montenegro) Red Star Belgrade	21.654
(Ukraine) Shakhtar Donetsk	17.301
(Denmark) Copenhagen	15.758
(Israel) Maccabi Tel Aviv	14.012
(Hungary) Ferencváros	13.045
(Romania) Dinamo București	12.880
(Croatia) Hajduk Split	11.734
(Turkey) Trabzonspor	11.656
(Russia) CSKA Moscow	8.572
(Sweden) Djurgårdens IF	8.516
(Switzerland) Young Boys	7.384
(Bulgaria) Lokomotiv Plovdiv	6.599
(Cyprus) APOEL	5.969
(Slovakia) Žilina	4.234

First qualifying round
Team	Coeff.
(Latvia) Skonto	3.979
(Finland) HJK	3.938
(Slovenia) HIT Gorica	3.024
(Moldova) Sheriff Tiraspol	2.254
(Bosnia and Herzegovina) Široki Brijeg	1.814
(Georgia (country)) WIT Georgia	1.649
(North Macedonia) Pobeda	1.594
(Lithuania) Kaunas	1.374
(Belarus) Gomel	1.182
(Iceland) KR	1.099
(Malta) Sliema Wanderers	1.099
(Republic of Ireland) Shelbourne	1.044
(Armenia) Pyunik	0.934
(Wales) Rhyl	0.769
(Albania) Tirana	0.604
(Estonia) Flora	0.549
(Northern Ireland) Linfield	0.549
(Luxembourg) Jeunesse Esch	0.494
(Azerbaijan) Neftçi	0.384
(Faroe Islands) HB	0.274

== First qualifying round ==
The draw for this round was performed on 25 June 2004 in Nyon, Switzerland.

=== Seeding ===
Seeded	Unseeded
(Latvia) Skonto (Finland) HJK (Slovenia) HIT Gorica (Moldova) Sheriff Tiraspol (Bosnia and Herzegovina) Široki Brijeg (Georgia (country)) WIT Georgia (North Macedonia) Pobeda (Lithuania) Kaunas (Belarus) Gomel (Iceland) KR	(Malta) Sliema Wanderers (Republic of Ireland) Shelbourne (Armenia) Pyunik (Wales) Rhyl (Albania) Tirana (Estonia) Flora (Northern Ireland) Linfield (Luxembourg) Jeunesse Esch (Azerbaijan) Neftçi (Faroe Islands) HB

=== Summary ===
Team 1	Agg.	Team 2	1st leg	2nd leg
KR (Iceland)	2–2 (a)	(Republic of Ireland) Shelbourne	2–2	0–0
Skonto (Latvia)	7–1	(Wales) Rhyl	4–0	3–1
Flora (Estonia)	3–7	(Slovenia) HIT Gorica	2–4	1–3
Linfield (Northern Ireland)	0–2	(Finland) HJK	0–1	0–1
Pobeda (North Macedonia)	2–4	(Armenia) Pyunik	1–3	1–1
Sheriff Tiraspol (Moldova)	2–1	(Luxembourg) Jeunesse Esch	2–0	0–1
WIT Georgia (Georgia (country))	5–3	(Faroe Islands) HB	5–0	0–3
Sliema Wanderers (Malta)	1–6	(Lithuania) Kaunas	0–2	1–4
Široki Brijeg (Bosnia and Herzegovina)	2–2 (a)	(Azerbaijan) Neftçi	2–1	0–1
Gomel (Belarus)	1–2	(Albania) Tirana	0–2	1–0

=== Matches ===
14 July 2004
22:00

KR (Iceland)	2–2	(Republic of Ireland) Shelbourne
Sigurgeirsson 47'; Ólafsson 54'	Report	Moore 83'; Sigurðsson 86' (o.g.)

Laugardalsvöllur, Reykjavík (Note: KR played their home match at Laugardalsvöllur in Reykjavík, instead of their regular venue KR-völlur in Reykjavík.)
Attendance: 1,238
Referee: Peter Vervecken (Belgium)
21 July 2004
20:45

Shelbourne (Republic of Ireland)	0–0	(Iceland) KR
	Report

Tolka Park, Dublin
Attendance: 3,674
Referee: Michael Svendsen (Denmark)

2–2 on aggregate; Shelbourne won on away goals.

14 July 2004
17:30

Skonto (Latvia)	4–0	(Wales) Rhyl
Miholaps 10', 56'; Dedura 65'; Višņakovs 78'	Report

Skonto Stadium, Riga
Attendance: 1,950
Referee: Ben Haverkort (Netherlands)
21 July 2004
20:00

Rhyl (Wales)	1–3	(Latvia) Skonto
G. Powell 50'	Report	Dedura 45'; Miholaps 80', 88'

Belle Vue, Rhyl
Attendance: 1,812
Referee: Wolfgang Sowa (Austria)

Skonto won 7–1 on aggregate.

14 July 2004
18:00

Flora (Estonia)	2–4	(Slovenia) HIT Gorica
Zahovaiko 81'; Post 90+2'	Report	Srebrnič 30'; Kršić 73'; Rodić 75'; Panič 90'

Lilleküla Stadium, Tallinn
Attendance: 700
Referee: Craig Thomson (Scotland)
21 July 2004
20:15

HIT Gorica (Slovenia)	3–1	(Estonia) Flora
Kokot 17' (pen.); Šturm 50', 52'	Report	Zahovaiko 68'

Nova Gorica Sports Park, Nova Gorica
Attendance: 1,138
Referee: Christoforos Zografos (Greece)

HIT Gorica won 7–3 on aggregate.

14 July 2004
20:45

Linfield (Northern Ireland)	0–1	(Finland) HJK
	Report	Kottila 76'

Windsor Park, Belfast
Attendance: 2,130
Referee: Stefan Johannesson (Sweden)
21 July 2004
18:00

HJK (Finland)	1–0	(Northern Ireland) Linfield
Kottila 27'	Report

ISS Stadion, Vantaa (Note: HJK played their home matches at ISS Stadion in Vantaa, instead of their regular venue Finnair Stadium in Helsinki.)
Attendance: 3,125
Referee: Serhiy Berezka (Ukraine)

HJK won 2–0 on aggregate.

13 July 2004
20:00

Pobeda (North Macedonia)	1–3	(Armenia) Pyunik
Gešovski 80'	Report	Manucharyan 15', 41'; Zh. Hovhannisyan 26'

Philip II Arena, Skopje (Note: Pobeda played their home match at Philip II Arena in Skopje, instead of their regular venue Stadion Goce Delčev in Prilep.)
Attendance: 1,500
Referee: Damir Skomina (Slovenia)
21 July 2004
18:00

Pyunik (Armenia)	1–1	(North Macedonia) Pobeda
G. Petrosyan 77'	Report	Dimitrovski 21'

Vazgen Sargsyan Republican Stadium, Yerevan
Attendance: 4,500
Referee: Guido Wildhaber (Switzerland)

Pyunik won 4–2 on aggregate.

14 July 2004
19:00

Sheriff Tiraspol (Moldova)	2–0	(Luxembourg) Jeunesse Esch
Priganiuc 32'; Kuznetsov 67'	Report

Sheriff Stadium, Tiraspol
Attendance: 5,300
Referee: János Megyebíró (Hungary)
21 July 2004
18:00

Jeunesse Esch (Luxembourg)	1–0	(Moldova) Sheriff Tiraspol
Cardoni 61'	Report

Stade de la Frontière, Esch-sur-Alzette
Attendance: 1,021
Referee: Draženko Kovačić (Croatia)

Sheriff Tiraspol won 2–1 on aggregate.

14 July 2004
15:00

WIT Georgia (Georgia (country))	5–0	(Faroe Islands) HB
Gochashvili 20'; Martsvaladze 32'; Dighmelashvili 43'; İntskirveli 47'; Ebanoidze 57'	Report

Boris Paichadze National Stadium, Tbilisi (Note: WIT Georgia played their home matches at Boris Paichadze National Stadium in Tbilisi, instead of their regular venue Armazi Stadium in Mtskheta.)
Attendance: 2,000
Referee: Costas Theodotou (Cyprus)
21 July 2004
20:00

HB (Faroe Islands)	3–0	(Georgia (country)) WIT Georgia
Thorsteinsson 66'; Jespersen 69'; Eliasen 88'	Report

Tórsvøllur, Tórshavn (Note: HB played their home match at Tórsvøllur stadium, instead of their regular home venue Gundadalur stadium.)
Attendance: 752
Referee: Ian Stokes (Republic of Ireland)

WIT Georgia won 5–3 on aggregate.

13 July 2004
18:00

Sliema Wanderers (Malta)	0–2	(Lithuania) Kaunas
	Report	Žutautas 55'; Sanajevas 77'

Ta' Qali National Stadium, Ta' Qali
Attendance: 445
Referee: Adrian McCourt (Northern Ireland)
21 July 2004
18:00

Kaunas (Lithuania)	4–1	(Malta) Sliema Wanderers
Gedgaudas 28'; Sanajevas 43'; Mikoliūnas 53'; Žaliūkas 90'	Report	M. Mifsud 71'

Darius and Girėnas Stadium, Kaunas
Attendance: 3,454
Referee: Radek Matějek (Czech Republic)

Kaunas won 6–1 on aggregate.

13 July 2004
20:15

Široki Brijeg (Bosnia and Herzegovina)	2–1	(Azerbaijan) Neftçi
Tabi 67'; Juričić 75'	Report	Tagizade 90+1'

Stadion Pecara, Široki Brijeg
Attendance: 2,500
Referee: Mirosław Ryszka (Poland)
21 July 2004
16:00

Neftçi (Azerbaijan)	1–0	(Bosnia and Herzegovina) Široki Brijeg
Quliyev 80'	Report

Tofiq Bahramov Republican Stadium, Baku
Attendance: 20,000
Referee: Richard Havrilla (Slovakia)

2–2 on aggregate; Neftçi won on away goals.

14 July 2004
17:00

Gomel (Belarus)	0–2	(Albania) Tirana
	Report	Muka 75'; Fortuzi 89'

Central Stadium, Gomel
Attendance: 7,500
Referee: Brage Sandmoen (Norway)
21 July 2004
18:00

Tirana (Albania)	0–1	(Belarus) Gomel
	Report	Bliznyuk 38'

Qemal Stafa Stadium, Tirana
Attendance: 1,000
Referee: Ionică Serea (Romania)

Tirana won 2–1 on aggregate.

== Second qualifying round ==
The draw for this round was performed on 25 June 2004 in Nyon, Switzerland.

=== Seeding ===
Seeded		Unseeded	
(Czech Republic) Sparta Prague (Belgium) Club Brugge (Norway) Rosenborg (Poland) Wisła Kraków (Serbia and Montenegro) Red Star Belgrade (Ukraine) Shakhtar Donetsk (Denmark) Copenhagen	(Israel) Maccabi Tel Aviv (Hungary) Ferencváros (Romania) Dinamo București (Croatia) Hajduk Split (Turkey) Trabzonspor (Russia) CSKA Moscow (Sweden) Djurgårdens IF	(Switzerland) Young Boys (Bulgaria) Lokomotiv Plovdiv (Cyprus) APOEL (Slovakia) Žilina (Latvia) Skonto (Finland) HJK (Slovenia) HIT Gorica	(Moldova) Sheriff Tiraspol (Azerbaijan) Neftçi (Georgia (country)) WIT Georgia (Armenia) Pyunik (Lithuania) Kaunas (Albania) Tirana (Republic of Ireland) Shelbourne

Notes

1. ^{†} Winners of the previous qualifying round whose identity was not known at the time of the draw. Teams in italics defeated a team with a higher coefficient in the previous qualifying round, thus effectively taking the coefficient of their defeated opponent in the draw for this round.

=== Summary ===
Team 1	Agg.	Team 2	1st leg	2nd leg
Pyunik (Armenia)	1–4	(Ukraine) Shakhtar Donetsk	1–3	0–1
APOEL (Cyprus)	3–4	(Czech Republic) Sparta Prague	2–2	1–2
Rosenborg (Norway)	4–1	(Moldova) Sheriff Tiraspol	2–1	2–0
Young Boys (Switzerland)	2–5	(Serbia and Montenegro) Red Star Belgrade	2–2	0–3
HIT Gorica (Slovenia)	6–2	(Denmark) Copenhagen	1–2	5–0
Neftçi (Azerbaijan)	0–2	(Russia) CSKA Moscow	0–0	0–2
Žilina (Slovakia)	0–2	(Romania) Dinamo București	0–1	0–1
HJK (Finland)	0–1	(Israel) Maccabi Tel Aviv	0–0	0–1
Skonto (Latvia)	1–4	(Turkey) Trabzonspor	1–1	0–3
Club Brugge (Belgium)	6–0	(Bulgaria) Lokomotiv Plovdiv	2–0	4–0
Tirana (Albania)	3–3 (a)	(Hungary) Ferencváros	2–3	1–0
Hajduk Split (Croatia)	3–4	(Republic of Ireland) Shelbourne	3–2	0–2
Djurgårdens IF (Sweden)	2–0	(Lithuania) Kaunas	0–0	2–0
WIT Georgia (Georgia (country))	2–11	(Poland) Wisła Kraków	2–8	0–3

=== Matches ===
27 July 2004
18:00

Pyunik (Armenia)	1–3	(Ukraine) Shakhtar Donetsk
Nazaryan 49'	Report	Marica 30', 74'; Aghahowa 86'

Vazgen Sargsyan Republican Stadium, Yerevan
Attendance: 3,524
Referee: Georgios Douros (Greece)
4 August 2004
18:00

Shakhtar Donetsk (Ukraine)	1–0	(Armenia) Pyunik
Hübschman 31'	Report

RSC Olimpiyskiy, Donetsk
Attendance: 17,623
Referee: Tony Asumaa (Finland)

Shakhtar Donetsk won 4–1 on aggregate.

28 July 2004
19:00

APOEL (Cyprus)	2–2	(Czech Republic) Sparta Prague
Alexandrou 6'; Charalambidis 47'	Report	Pacanda 82'; Sivok 89'

GSP Stadium, Nicosia
Attendance: 11,006
Referee: Alberto Undiano Mallenco (Spain)
4 August 2004
20:00

Sparta Prague (Czech Republic)	2–1	(Cyprus) APOEL
Poborský 31'; Pacanda 55'	Report	Charalambidis 52'

Stadion Letná, Prague
Attendance: 14,408
Referee: Mike RIley (England)

Sparta Prague won 4–3 on aggregate.

28 July 2004
20:45

Rosenborg (Norway)	2–1	(Moldova) Sheriff Tiraspol
F. Johnsen 24'; George 85'	Report	Cociș 34'

Lerkendal Stadion, Trondheim
Attendance: 10,909
Referee: Andrejs Sipailo (Latvia)
4 August 2004
19:00

Sheriff Tiraspol (Moldova)	0–2	(Norway) Rosenborg
	Report	Berg 36'; Brattbakk 40'

Sheriff Stadium, Tiraspol
Attendance: 9,000
Referee: René Rogalla (Switzerland)

Rosenborg won 4–1 on aggregate.

28 July 2004
20:15

Young Boys (Switzerland)	2–2	(Serbia and Montenegro) Red Star Belgrade
Chapuisat 6'; Eugster 65'	Report	Žigić 79', 88'

Hardturm, Zürich (Note: Young Boys played their home match at Hardturm stadium in Zürich, instead of their regular home venue Stadion Neufeld in Bern.)
Attendance: 10,350
Referee: Pieter Vink (Netherlands)
4 August 2004
20:15

Red Star Belgrade (Serbia and Montenegro)	3–0	(Switzerland) Young Boys
Miladinović 39'; Dudić 49'; Žigić 69'	Report

Red Star Stadium, Belgrade
Attendance: 38,500
Referee: Damien Ledentu (France)

Red Star Belgrade won 5–2 on aggregate.

27 July 2004
20:15

HIT Gorica (Slovenia)	1–2	(Denmark) Copenhagen
Rodić 57'	Report	Álvaro 44'; Møller 77'

Nova Gorica Sports Park, Nova Gorica
Attendance: 1,214
Referee: David Malcolm (Northern Ireland)
4 August 2004
20:00

Copenhagen (Denmark)	0–5	(Slovenia) HIT Gorica
	Report	Rodić 28', 52'; Šturm 39', 77'; Srebrnič 45'

Parken Stadium, Copenhagen
Attendance: 13,601
Referee: Gerald Lehner (Austria)

HIT Gorica won 6–2 on aggregate.

27 July 2004
16:00

Neftçi (Azerbaijan)	0–0	(Russia) CSKA Moscow
	Report

Tofiq Bahramov Republican Stadium, Baku
Attendance: 25,000
Referee: Asaf Kenan (Israel)
4 August 2004
18:00

CSKA Moscow (Russia)	2–0	(Azerbaijan) Neftçi
Gusev 68'; Vágner Love 72'	Report

Dynamo Stadium, Moscow
Attendance: 10,000
Referee: Daniel Stålhammar (Sweden)

CSKA Moscow won 2–0 on aggregate.

28 July 2004
20:00

Žilina (Slovakia)	0–1	(Romania) Dinamo București
	Report	Dănciulescu 89'

Štadión pod Dubňom, Žilina
Attendance: 4,268
Referee: Selçuk Dereli (Turkey)
4 August 2004
20:00

Dinamo București (Romania)	1–0	(Slovakia) Žilina
Dănciulescu 19'	Report

Stadionul Național, Bucharest
Attendance: 11,000
Referee: Alan Kelly (Republic of Ireland)

Dinamo București won 2–0 on aggregate.

27 July 2004
18:00

HJK (Finland)	0–0	(Israel) Maccabi Tel Aviv
	Report

ISS Stadion, Vantaa
Attendance: 4,035
Referee: Alexey Tiumin (Russia)
4 August 2004
18:00

Maccabi Tel Aviv (Israel)	1–0	(Finland) HJK
L. Cohen 88'	Report

Bloomfield Stadium, Tel Aviv
Attendance: 5,740
Referee: Ivan Bebek (Croatia)

Maccabi Tel Aviv won 1–0 on aggregate.

28 July 2004
19:30

Skonto (Latvia)	1–1	(Turkey) Trabzonspor
Kalniņš 67'	Report	Mehmet Yılmaz 86'

Skonto Stadium, Riga
Attendance: 5,045
Referee: Knut Kircher (Germany)
4 August 2004
18:30

Trabzonspor (Turkey)	3–0	(Latvia) Skonto
Yattara 57'; Mehmet Yılmaz 65'; Fatih 83'	Report

Hüseyin Avni Aker Stadium, Trabzon
Attendance: 12,060
Referee: Serge Gumienny (Belgium)

Trabzonspor won 4–1 on aggregate.

28 July 2004
20:30

Club Brugge (Belgium)	2–0	(Bulgaria) Lokomotiv Plovdiv
Balaban 71', 88'	Report

Jan Breydel Stadium, Bruges
Attendance: 12,767
Referee: Duarte Gomes (Portugal)
4 August 2004
20:00

Lokomotiv Plovdiv (Bulgaria)	0–4	(Belgium) Club Brugge
	Report	Balaban 14', 44'; Sæternes 74'; Čeh 84'

Naftex Stadium, Burgas (Note: Lokomotiv Plovdiv played their home match at Naftex Stadium in Burgas, instead of their regular home venue Stadion Lokomotiv in Plovdiv.)
Attendance: 7,300
Referee: Matteo Trefoloni (Italy)

Club Brugge won 6–0 on aggregate.

27 July 2004
18:00

Tirana (Albania)	2–3	(Hungary) Ferencváros
Muka 58', 68'	Report	Huszti 41' (pen.), 90+3'; Hajdari 88' (o.g.)

Qemal Stafa Stadium, Tirana
Attendance: 3,000
Referee: Bülent Demirlek (Turkey)
4 August 2004
20:00

Ferencváros (Hungary)	0–1	(Albania) Tirana
	Report	Muka 13'

Üllői úti stadion, Budapest
Attendance: 5,015
Referee: Charlie Richmond (Scotland)

3–3 on aggregate; Ferencváros won on away goals.

28 July 2004
20:30

Hajduk Split (Croatia)	3–2	(Republic of Ireland) Shelbourne
Blatnjak 18', 85'; Šuto 48'	Report	Fitzpatrick 5'; Moore 89'

Stadion Poljud, Split
Attendance: 9,780
Referee: Viktor Kassai (Hungary)
4 August 2004
20:00

Shelbourne (Republic of Ireland)	2–0	(Croatia) Hajduk Split
Rogers 78'; Moore 90+3'	Report

Tolka Park, Dublin
Attendance: 8,317
Referee: Stanislav Sukhina (Russia)

Shelbourne won 4–3 on aggregate.

28 July 2004
20:45

Djurgårdens IF (Sweden)	0–0	(Lithuania) Kaunas
	Report

Råsunda Stadium, Solna
Attendance: 6,679
Referee: Cristian Balaj (Romania)
4 August 2004
20:15

Kaunas (Lithuania)	0–2	(Sweden) Djurgårdens IF
	Report	Johansson 25'; Barsom 68'

Darius and Girėnas Stadium, Kaunas
Attendance: 5,500
Referee: Dragomir Tanović (Serbia and Montenegro)

Djurgårdens IF won 2–0 on aggregate.

27 July 2004
15:00

WIT Georgia (Georgia (country))	2–8	(Poland) Wisła Kraków
Kobiashvili 13'; Adamia 51'	Report	Frankowski 4', 5', 26', 51'; Gorawski 24'; Żurawski 58', 67'; Kuźba 76'

Boris Paichadze National Stadium, Tbilisi
Attendance: 2,000
Referee: Per Ivar Staberg (Norway)
4 August 2004
20:15

Wisła Kraków (Poland)	3–0	(Georgia (country)) WIT Georgia
Kuźba 23'; Omeonu 35'; Gorawski 63'	Report

Stadion Miejski, Kraków
Attendance: 4,800
Referee: Novo Panić (Bosnia and Herzegovina)

Wisła Kraków won 11–2 on aggregate.

== Third qualifying round ==
The draw for this round was performed on 30 July 2004 in Nyon, Switzerland.

=== Seeding ===
Seeded		Unseeded	
(Spain) Real Madrid (England) Manchester United (Spain) Deportivo La Coruña (England) Liverpool (Italy) Juventus (Italy) Internazionale (Netherlands) PSV Eindhoven (Germany) Bayer Leverkusen	(Czech Republic) Sparta Prague (France) Monaco (Belgium) Anderlecht (Belgium) Club Brugge (Scotland) Rangers (Norway) Rosenborg (Greece) PAOK (Ukraine) Dynamo Kyiv	(Poland) Wisła Kraków (Portugal) Benfica (Switzerland) Basel (Serbia and Montenegro) Red Star Belgrade (Austria) GAK (Israel) Maccabi Haifa (Ukraine) Shakhtar Donetsk (Slovenia) HIT Gorica	(Israel) Maccabi Tel Aviv (Hungary) Ferencváros (Romania) Dinamo București (Republic of Ireland) Shelbourne (Turkey) Trabzonspor (Czech Republic) Baník Ostrava (Russia) CSKA Moscow (Sweden) Djurgårdens IF

Notes

1. ^{†} Winners of the previous qualifying round whose identity was not known at the time of the draw. Teams in italics defeated a team with a higher coefficient in the previous qualifying round, thus effectively taking the coefficient of their defeated opponent in the draw for this round.

=== Summary ===
Team 1	Agg.	Team 2	1st leg	2nd leg
GAK (Austria)	1–2	(England) Liverpool	0–2	1–0
Juventus (Italy)	6–3	(Sweden) Djurgårdens IF	2–2	4–1
Ferencváros (Hungary)	1–2	(Czech Republic) Sparta Prague	1–0	0–2 (a.e.t.)
Rosenborg (Norway)	5–3	(Israel) Maccabi Haifa	2–1	3–2 (a.e.t.)
Bayer Leverkusen (Germany)	6–2	(Czech Republic) Baník Ostrava	5–0	1–2
CSKA Moscow (Russia)	3–2	(Scotland) Rangers	2–1	1–1
Shakhtar Donetsk (Ukraine)	6–3	(Belgium) Club Brugge	4–1	2–2
Dynamo Kyiv (Ukraine)	3–2	(Turkey) Trabzonspor	1–2	2–0
Red Star Belgrade (Serbia and Montenegro)	3–7	(Netherlands) PSV Eindhoven	3–2	0–5
Dinamo București (Romania)	1–5	(England) Manchester United	1–2	0–3
Basel (Switzerland)	2–5	(Italy) Internazionale	1–1	1–4
Benfica (Portugal)	1–3	(Belgium) Anderlecht	1–0	0–3
Shelbourne (Republic of Ireland)	0–3	(Spain) Deportivo La Coruña	0–0	0–3
PAOK (Greece)	0–4	(Israel) Maccabi Tel Aviv	0–3 (Note: The first leg finished 2–1 to Maccabi Tel Aviv, but was awarded 3–0 against PAOK for fielding a suspended player.)	0–1
HIT Gorica (Slovenia)	0–9	(France) Monaco	0–3	0–6
Wisła Kraków (Poland)	1–5	(Spain) Real Madrid	0–2	1–3

=== Matches ===
10 August 2004
20:45

GAK (Austria)	0–2	(England) Liverpool
	Report	Gerrard 22', 78'

Stadion Graz-Liebenau, Graz
Attendance: 14,617
Referee: Alain Sars (France)
24 August 2004
21:10

Liverpool (England)	0–1	(Austria) GAK
	Report	Tokić 54'

Anfield, Liverpool
Attendance: 42,350
Referee: Luis Medina Cantalejo (Spain)

Liverpool won 2–1 on aggregate.

10 August 2004
21:00

Juventus (Italy)	2–2	(Sweden) Djurgårdens IF
Trezeguet 50'; Emerson 59'	Report	Johansson 45+1' (pen.); Hysén 49'

Stadio delle Alpi, Turin
Attendance: 26,146
Referee: Herbert Fandel (Germany)
25 August 2004
20:45

Djurgårdens IF (Sweden)	1–4	(Italy) Juventus
Arneng 19'	Report	Del Piero 10'; Trezeguet 35', 87'; Nedvěd 54'

Råsunda Stadium, Solna
Attendance: 32,058
Referee: Graham Poll (England)

Juventus won 6–3 on aggregate.

11 August 2004
20:00

Ferencváros (Hungary)	1–0	(Czech Republic) Sparta Prague
Vágner 26'	Report

Üllői úti stadion, Budapest
Attendance: 8,165
Referee: Florian Meyer (Germany)
25 August 2004
20:05

Sparta Prague (Czech Republic)	2–0 (a.e.t.)	(Hungary) Ferencváros
Zelenka 45+3'; Homola 114'	Report

Stadion Letná, Prague
Attendance: 18,010
Referee: Urs Meier (Switzerland)

Sparta Prague won 2–1 on aggregate.

11 August 2004
20:45

Rosenborg (Norway)	2–1	(Israel) Maccabi Haifa
Brattbakk 1'; Solli 8'	Report	Rosso 45+2'

Lerkendal Stadion, Trondheim
Attendance: 18,482
Referee: Konrad Plautz (Austria)
24 August 2004
20:15

Maccabi Haifa (Israel)	2–3 (a.e.t.)	(Norway) Rosenborg
Badir 31'; Boccoli 38'	Report	Brattbakk 90'; Braaten 94'; Berg 120+5'

Ramat Gan Stadium, Ramat Gan (Note: Maccabi Haifa played their home match at Ramat Gan Stadium in Ramat Gan, instead of their regular home venue Kiryat Eliezer Stadium in Haifa.)
Attendance: 26,000
Referee: Gilles Veissière (France)

Rosenborg won 5–3 on aggregate.

11 August 2004
20:30

Bayer Leverkusen (Germany)	5–0	(Czech Republic) Baník Ostrava
França 11', 67', 88'; Juan 74'; Berbatov 82'	Report

BayArena, Leverkusen
Attendance: 19,500
Referee: Stuart Dougal (Scotland)
25 August 2004
20:45

Baník Ostrava (Czech Republic)	2–1	(Germany) Bayer Leverkusen
Papadopulos 38'; Žůrek 82'	Report	Berbatov 76'

Bazaly, Ostrava
Attendance: 5,396
Referee: Manuel Mejuto González (Spain)

Bayer Leverkusen won 6–2 on aggregate.

10 August 2004
18:00

CSKA Moscow (Russia)	2–1	(Scotland) Rangers
Vágner Love 4'; Jarošík 46'	Report	Novo 37'

Lokomotiv Stadium, Moscow (Note: CSKA Moscow played their Third qualifying round home match at Lokomotiv Stadium in Moscow, instead of their regular home venue Dynamo Stadium.)
Attendance: 19,000
Referee: Jan Wegereef (Netherlands)
25 August 2004
21:00

Rangers (Scotland)	1–1	(Russia) CSKA Moscow
Thompson 87'	Report	Vágner Love 60'

Ibrox Stadium, Glasgow
Attendance: 49,010
Referee: Wolfgang Stark (Germany)

CSKA Moscow won 3–2 on aggregate.

11 August 2004
18:00

Shakhtar Donetsk (Ukraine)	4–1	(Belgium) Club Brugge
Aghahowa 15'; Marica 70'; Vorobey 77'; Brandão 90+1'	Report	Balaban 50'

RSC Olimpiyskiy, Donetsk
Attendance: 25,093
Referee: Tom Henning Øvrebø (Norway)
25 August 2004
20:30

Club Brugge (Belgium)	2–2	(Ukraine) Shakhtar Donetsk
Čeh 15', 34' (pen.)	Report	Vukić 6', 52'

Jan Breydel Stadium, Bruges
Attendance: 15,900
Referee: Steve Bennett (England)

Shakhtar Donetsk won 6–3 on aggregate.

10 August 2004
19:00

Dynamo Kyiv (Ukraine)	1–2	(Turkey) Trabzonspor
Verpakovskis 21'	Report	Karadeniz 34'; Yattara 65'

Valeriy Lobanovskyi Dynamo Stadium, Kyiv
Attendance: 16,863
Referee: Frank De Bleeckere (Belgium)
25 August 2004
18:00

Trabzonspor (Turkey)	0–2	(Ukraine) Dynamo Kyiv
	Report	Gavrančić 6'; Rincón 28'

Hüseyin Avni Aker Stadium, Trabzon
Attendance: 15,081
Referee: Domenico Messina (Italy)

Dynamo Kyiv won 3–2 on aggregate.

11 August 2004
20:30

Red Star Belgrade (Serbia and Montenegro)	3–2	(Netherlands) PSV Eindhoven
Dudić 20'; Janković 39'; Pantelić 59'	Report	Park Ji-sung 8'; De Jong 65'

Red Star Stadium, Belgrade
Attendance: 44,288
Referee: Pierluigi Collina (Italy)
25 August 2004
20:30

PSV Eindhoven (Netherlands)	5–0	(Serbia and Montenegro) Red Star Belgrade
van Bommel 9' (pen.), 56'; Beasley 32'; de Jong 57'; Vennegoor of Hesselink 80'	Report

Philips Stadion, Eindhoven
Attendance: 29,800
Referee: Valentin Ivanov (Russia)

PSV Eindhoven won 7–3 on aggregate.

11 August 2004
20:45

Dinamo București (Romania)	1–2	(England) Manchester United
Dănciulescu 9'	Report	Giggs 37'; Alistar 70' (o.g.)

Stadionul Național, Bucharest
Attendance: 50,000
Referee: Paulo Costa (Portugal)
25 August 2004
21:10

Manchester United (England)	3–0	(Romania) Dinamo București
Smith 47', 50'; Bellion 70'	Report

Old Trafford, Manchester
Attendance: 61,041
Referee: Markus Merk (Germany)

Manchester United won 5–1 on aggregate.

11 August 2004
20:45

Basel (Switzerland)	1–1	(Italy) Internazionale
Huggel 25'	Report	Adriano 19'

St. Jakob-Park, Basel
Attendance: 29,500
Referee: Graham Poll (England)
24 August 2004
21:00

Internazionale (Italy)	4–1	(Switzerland) Basel
Adriano 1', 52'; Stanković 12'; Recoba 59'	Report	Sterjovski 49'

San Siro, Milan
Attendance: 50,506
Referee: Anders Frisk (Sweden)

Internazionale won 5–2 on aggregate.

10 August 2004
21:00

Benfica (Portugal)	1–0	(Belgium) Anderlecht
Zahovič 13'	Report

Estádio da Luz, Lisbon
Attendance: 62,077
Referee: Peter Fröjdfeldt (Sweden)
24 August 2004
20:30

Anderlecht (Belgium)	3–0	(Portugal) Benfica
Dindane 34', 59'; Jestrović 73' (pen.)	Report

Constant Vanden Stock Stadium, Brussels
Attendance: 20,107
Referee: Stefano Farina (Italy)

Anderlecht won 3–1 on aggregate.

11 August 2004
20:45

Shelbourne (Republic of Ireland)	0–0	(Spain) Deportivo La Coruña
	Report

Lansdowne Road, Dublin (Note: Shelbourne played their Third qualifying round home match at Lansdowne Road in Dublin, instead of their regular home venue Tolka Park.)
Attendance: 23,320
Referee: Michal Beneš (Czech Republic)
24 August 2004
21:00

Deportivo La Coruña (Spain)	3–0	(Republic of Ireland) Shelbourne
Víctor 59', 65'; Pandiani 88'	Report

Estadio Riazor, A Coruña
Attendance: 20,224
Referee: Alain Hamer (Luxembourg)

Deportivo La Coruña won 3–0 on aggregate.

10 August 2004
20:00

PAOK (Greece)	0–3 Awarded (Note: The PAOK v Maccabi Tel Aviv first leg match originally finished 2–1 to Maccabi Tel Aviv, but was later awarded 3–0 against PAOK for fielding a suspended player.)	(Israel) Maccabi Tel Aviv
Yiasoumi 50'	Report	Addo 12'; Mesika 42'

Toumba Stadium, Thessaloniki
Attendance: 20,655
Referee: Arturo Daudén Ibáñez (Spain)
25 August 2004
18:00

Maccabi Tel Aviv (Israel)	1–0	(Greece) PAOK
L. Cohen 8'	Report

Bloomfield Stadium, Tel Aviv
Attendance: 8,450
Referee: Ľuboš Micheľ (Slovakia)

Maccabi Tel Aviv won 4–0 on aggregate.

11 August 2004
20:45

HIT Gorica (Slovenia)	0–3	(France) Monaco
	Report	Kallon 9', 89'; Chevantón 77'

Nova Gorica Sports Park, Nova Gorica
Attendance: 3,066
Referee: René Temmink (Netherlands)
24 August 2004
20:45

Monaco (France)	6–0	(Slovenia) HIT Gorica
Chevantón 18'; Bernardi 32'; El Fakiri 42'; Kallon 47'; Farnerud 66'; Adebayor 84' (pen.)	Report

Stade Louis II, Monaco
Attendance: 9,839
Referee: Mike Riley (England)

Monaco won 9–0 on aggregate.

11 August 2004
20:45

Wisła Kraków (Poland)	0–2	(Spain) Real Madrid
	Report	Morientes 72', 90'

Stadion Miejski, Kraków
Attendance: 10,000
Referee: Massimo Busacca (Switzerland)
25 August 2004
21:30

Real Madrid (Spain)	3–1	(Poland) Wisła Kraków
Ronaldo 3', 31'; Pavón 85'	Report	Gorawski 89'

Santiago Bernabéu, Madrid
Attendance: 67,500
Referee: Kim Milton Nielsen (Denmark)

Real Madrid won 5–1 on aggregate.
