= Kuparinen =

Kuparinen is a Finnish surname. Notable people with the surname include:

- Eeki Kuparinen (born 1991), Finnish Grand Prix motorcycle racer
- Matti Kuparinen (born 1984), Finnish professional ice hockey forward
- Tuomas Kuparinen (born 1979), Finnish football player
