= Sarsour =

Sarsour is an Arabic surname. Notable people with the surname include:

- Ibrahim Sarsour, 2006-2015 chairman of the Ra'am party in Israel
- Linda Sarsour (born 1980), American activist of Palestinian ancestry
- Rubel Sarsour (born 1983), Arab-Israeli football player
