= F.C. Ashdod in European football =

Israeli club in European football

- Club: F.C. Ashdod
- First entry: 2005–06 UEFA Cup
- Latest entry: 2021–22 UEFA Europa Conference League

F.C. Ashdod, an Israeli football club, has played in European football since 2005, in the UEFA Cup and the Europa Conference League.

== Overall record ==
Accurate as of 29 July 2021

Competition	Pld	W	D	L	GF	GA	GD	W%
UEFA Cup	2	0	2	0	3	3	+0	0.00
UEFA Europa Conference League	2	0	1	1	0	1	−1	0.00
Total	4	0	3	1	3	4	−1	0.00

== Matches ==
Season	Competition	Round	Opponent	Home	Away	Aggregate	Source
2005–06	UEFA Cup	Q2	(Slovenia) Domžale	2–2	1–1	3–3 (a)	
2021–22	Europa Conference League	Q2	(Azerbaijan) Qarabağ	0–1	0–0	0–1	
