= Nilton Fernandes =

Cape Verdean footballer (1979–2024)

Nilton
Personal information
- Full name: Nilton Rogério Cardoso Fernandes
- Date of birth: 7 March 1979
- Place of birth: Brava, Cape Verde
- Date of death: 31 March 2024 (aged 45)
- Place of death: United States
- Height: 1.78 m (5 ft 10 in)
- Position: Midfielder

Youth career
- 1993–1997: Boavista

Senior career*
Years	Team	Apps	(Gls)
1997–2000	Boavista	12	(0)
1997–1998	→ Gondomar (loan)	32	(4)
1998–1999	→ Esposende (loan)	21	(0)
2000–2001	Aves	26	(1)
2001–2002	Gil Vicente	22	(0)
2002–2003	Marco	33	(2)
2003–2004	Salgueiros	28	(1)
2004–2006	Penafiel	50	(0)
2006–2007	Koper	25	(6)
2007–2008	Ethnikos Achna	9	(0)
2008–2009	Maribor	40	(4)
2009–2010	Chernomorets Burgas	10	(0)
2010–2011	Akritas Chlorakas	4	(0)
2012	Ironi Bat Yam	6	(0)
Total		318	(18)
- * Club domestic league appearances and goals

Nilton Rogério Cardoso Fernandes (7 March 1979 – 31 March 2024), known simply as Nilton, was a Cape Verdean former footballer who played as a midfielder.

He spent most of his career in Portugal, amassing Primeira Liga totals of 110 matches and one goal with four teams.

== Career ==
Born in the island of Brava, Nilton played youth football with Portuguese club Boavista FC, who loaned him to Gondomar S.C. and AD Esposende to kickstart his senior career. Upon his return, he appeared in 12 Primeira Liga games in the 1999–2000 season, helping to a fourth-place finish.

In the following years, Nilton alternated between the top division and the Segunda Liga, representing C.D. Aves (where he scored his first goal, contributing to a 3–2 home win against C.F. Estrela da Amadora on 13 May 2001 as his team was eventually relegated), Gil Vicente FC, F.C. Marco, S.C. Salgueiros and F.C. Penafiel. He left the country in the summer of 2006, scoring a career-best six goals for FC Koper and winning the Slovenian Football Cup.

From 2007 until his retirement five years later, aged 33, Nilton played for Ethnikos Achna FC (Cyprus), NK Maribor (Slovenia), PFC Chernomorets Burgas (Bulgaria), Akritas Chlorakas (Cypriot Second Division) and Maccabi Ironi Bat Yam FC (Israeli second level).

== Death ==
On 31 March 2024, Nilton Fernandes died from kidney cancer while in the United States.

== Honours ==
Koper

- Slovenian Football Cup: 2006–07

Maribor

- Slovenian PrvaLiga: 2008–09
