= Radim Wozniak =

Czech footballer (born 1978)

Personal information
- Date of birth: 29 January 1978 (age 48)
- Place of birth: Czechoslovakia
- Height: 1.84 m (6 ft 0 in)
- Position: Defender

Youth career
- Lokomotiva Ostrava

Senior career*
Years	Team	Apps	(Gls)
1995–2003	FC Baník Ostrava	22	(0)
2001–2002	SK České Budějovice (loan)	23	(1)
2003–2005	FK Mladá Boleslav	33	(1)
2005–2006	Dukla Banská Bystrica		
2007–2011	FC Hradec Králové	100	(0)
2011–2013	MFK Frýdek-Místek		
- * Club domestic league appearances and goals as of 17 September 2020

Radim Wozniak (born 29 January 1978) is a Czech retired football player.

Wozniak, a native of Ostrava, started his football career in the clubs in this city. With FC Baník Ostrava he appeared in the Gambrinus liga. During his stay at SK České Budějovice and FK Mladá Boleslav he won the promotion from the Second League to the top flight division. In 2007, he moved to FC Hradec Králové. Three years later his team was promoted to the Gambrinus liga.
