= Kisovec =

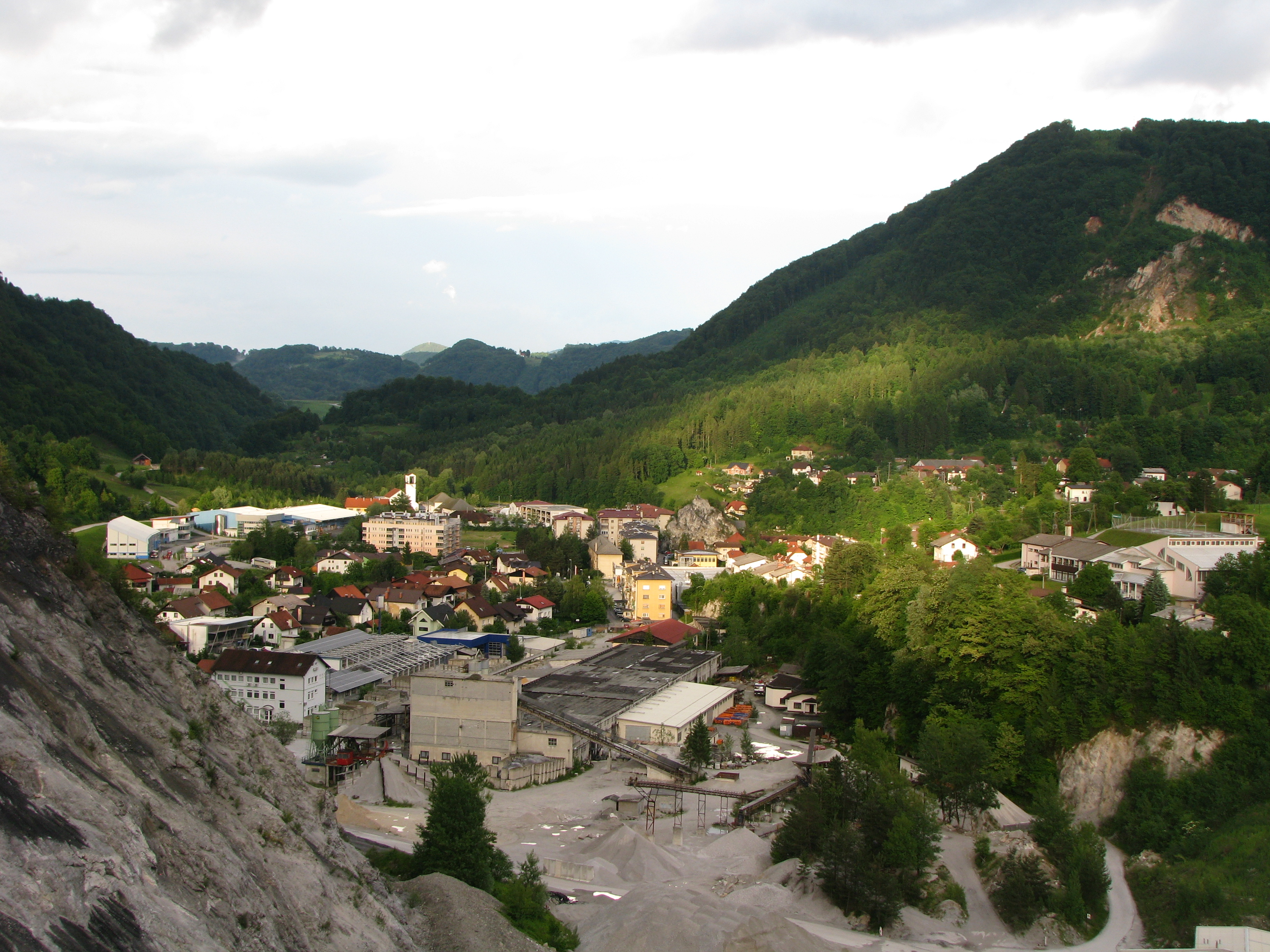

- Location in Slovenia
- Coordinates: 46°8′17.5″N 14°58′2.11″E
- Country: Slovenia
- Traditional region: Upper Carniola
- Statistical region: Central Sava
- Municipality: Zagorje ob Savi

Area
  - Total: 1.84 km^{2} (0.71 sq mi)
- Elevation: 284.5 m (933 ft)

Population (2017)
  - Total: 1,755
- Postal code: 1412

Kisovec (pronounced [ˈkiːsɔʋəts]) is a settlement in the Municipality of Zagorje ob Savi in central Slovenia. The settlement developed around the local coal mine, closed in 1952. Since 1978 a factory producing aerated autoclaved concrete has been in operation in the settlement and provided employment for local people. The area is part of the traditional region of Upper Carniola. It is now included with the rest of the municipality in the Central Sava Statistical Region.
