= Andrei Mațiura =

Moldovan footballer and coach

Personal information
- Date of birth: 4 October 1981 (age 45)
- Place of birth: Bălți, Moldovan SSR
- Height: 1.79 m (5 ft 10 1/2 in)
- Position: Midfielder

Team information
- Current team: Turan Tovuz (assistant coach)

Senior career*
| Years | Team | Apps | (Gls) |
| 2000–2001 | Olimpia | 13 | (1) |
| 2001–2002 | Hîncești | 12 | (1) |
| 2002–2003 | Nistru Otaci | 12 | (4) |
| 2003 | Terek Grozny | 15 | (1) |
| 2003–2007 | Nistru Otaci | 93 | (9) |
| 2007 | Metallurg-Kuzbass | 15 | (0) |
| 2008 | Dynamo Saint Petersburg | 28 | (1) |

International career
| 2002 | Moldova | 3 | (0) |

Managerial career
- 2011–2012: Academia Chișinău (assistant)
- 2012: Speranța Crihana Veche (assistant)
- 2012–2013: Iskra-Stal (assistant)
- 2014–2015: Zimbru Chișinău (assistant)
- 2020: Kyzylzhar (analyst)
- 2022: Tractor (assistant)
- 2023–2024: Dynamo Makhachkala (assistant)
- 2024–: Turan Tovuz (assistant)
- * Club domestic league appearances and goals

Andrei Mațiura (born 4 October 1981) is a Moldovan football coach and a former midfielder. He is an assistant coach with Azerbaijan Premier League club Turan Tovuz.

== Playing career ==
Mațiura has played for FC Olimpia, FC Hîncești, Nistru Otaci, Terek Grozny, Metallurg-Kuzbass Novokuznetsk and Dynamo Saint Petersburg. He has also made 3 appearances for the Moldova national team.
