= Joviša Kraljevič =

Slovenian footballer

Personal information
- Full name: Joviša Kraljevič
- Date of birth: 20 November 1976 (age 49)
- Place of birth: Slovenia
- Position: Defender

Senior career*
Years	Team	Apps	(Gls)
2000-2001	Šmartno	25	(1)
2001-2002	Rudar Velenje	26	(1)
2002	Korotan Prevalje	11	(0)
2003	Mura	2	(0)
2003	Dravinja	15	(0)
2003-2004	Šmartno	22	(1)
2004-2005	Bela Krajina	7	(0)
2005-2009	Rudar Velenje	81	(2)
2009-2011	Šmartno 1928	29	(4)
2011-2013	Šoštanj		
- * Club domestic league appearances and goals

Joviša Kraljevič (born 20 November 1976) is a Slovenian footballer played for Rudar Velenje as a defender.
