= Giorgi Alaverdashvili =

Georgian footballer

Personal information
- Full name: Giorgi Alaverdashvili
- Date of birth: 21 November 1987 (age 38)
- Place of birth: Tbilisi, Georgia
- Height: 1.78 m (5 ft 10 in)
- Positions: Left winger; second striker

Senior career*
Years	Team	Apps	(Gls)
2004–2007	Lokomotivi Tbilisi	50	(19)
2007–2009	Borjomi		
2009	Pallo-Iirot	2	(0)
2009–2011	Lusitano de Évora	9	(0)
2011	Samtredia	12	(0)
2012	Guria Lanchkhuti	9	(0)
2012–2013	Banga Gargždai	15	(11)
2013	Kruoja Pakruojis	3	(4)
2013	Šiauliai	11	(5)
2013–2014	Gaz Metan Mediaș	0	(0)
2014	Granitas	12	(4)
2014	Metalurgi Rustavi	8	(1)
2015	Zawisza Bydgoszcz	9	(0)
2016	Guria Lanchkhuti	14	(1)
2016–2017	Táborsko	1	(0)
2017	Prostějov	11	(0)
2018	Valašské Meziříčí	8	(0)

International career
2005	Georgia U19	2	(0)
- * Club domestic league appearances and goals

Giorgi Alaverdashvili (Georgian: გიორგი ალავერდაშვილი; born 21 November 1987) is a Georgian former professional footballer.

== Honours ==
Lokomotivi Tbilisi

- Georgian Cup: 2004–05

Šiauliai

- Lithuanian Football Cup runner-up: 2012–13
