= Marios Neophytou =

Cypriot footballer (born 1977)

Personal information
- Full name: Marios Neophytou
- Date of birth: 4 February 1977 (age 49)
- Place of birth: Limassol, Cyprus
- Height: 1.82 m (6 ft 0 in)
- Position: Striker

Senior career*
Years	Team	Apps	(Gls)
1993–1999	AEL Limassol	130	(62)
1999–2003	Anorthosis	83	(59)
2003–2004	OFI	20	(4)
2004–2007	APOEL	51	(26)
2007–2008	AEK	15	(4)
2008–2009	Nea Salamina	16	(3)
2009	Olympiakos Nicosia	8	(7)
2009–2010	APOP Kinyras Peyias	9	(0)
2010–2012	Akritas Chloraka	31	(10)
2012–2013	APEP	15	(6)
2013–2014	Ayia Napa	2	(0)

International career
2000–2004	Cyprus	5	(0)

Managerial career
- 2011–2012: Akritas Chlorakas
- 2012–2013: APEP
- 2013: Ayia Napa
- 2013–2014: AEL Limassol (assistant manager)
- 2015–2017: Ermis Aradippou (assistant manager)
- 2024: AEL Limassol (assistant manager)
- * Club domestic league appearances and goals

Marios Neophytou (Greek: Μάριος Νεοφύτου; born 4 February 1977 in Limassol, Cyprus) is a retired Cypriot football striker.

== Club career ==
He began his career in 1993, playing for AEL Limassol. He remained to AEL until 1999, when he was transferred to Anorthosis. In his last season in Anorthosis, after having a successful season with his team and playing in all the Championship matches for his team scoring thirty three goals and becoming the top scorer in the season 2002-2003. Then he caused the interest of the Greek team OFI and he transferred there in the summer of 2003. The next season, he returned in Cyprus, to APOEL where in three seasons he scored 26 goals. In June 2007 he signed with AEK Larnaca. In 2008, he signed for Nea Salamina and then for Olympiakos Nicosia in 2009. He then moved to APOP Kinyras Peyias. Afterwards he signed to Akritas Chlorakas in 2010 where he played for one year as a player and became the season's top scorer of the club.

== International career ==
On 15 November 2000, Neophytou made his debut with the national team of Cyprus in the home victory 5–0 against Andorra for 2002 FIFA World Cup qualification match, coming on as a substitute in 74th minute.

== Coaching career ==
In 2011, he became also the coach of Akritas team and continued also as a player. In June 2012, Neophytou signed with APEP, becoming their new coach/player. In April 2013, he undertook Ayia Napa, again with double role, so as to help the team to gain the promotion in the Cypriot First Division but in October 2013 left the club to join AEL Limassol as caretaker manager and later as an assistant manager by the side of the Bulgarian manager Ivaylo Petev. In November 2014, after Ivaylo Petev was sacked, Neophytou was also released from AEL.
