= Aleš Jeseničnik =

Slovenian footballer

Personal information
- Full name: Aleš Jeseničnik
- Date of birth: 28 June 1984 (age 42)
- Place of birth: Velenje, SFR Yugoslavia
- Height: 1.84 m (6 ft 0 in)
- Position: Left-back

Senior career*
Years	Team	Apps	(Gls)
–2003	Rudar Velenje	4	(0)
2003–2006	Domžale	27	(1)
2006–2014	Rudar Velenje	149	(0)
2014–2018	Mons Claudius		
- * Club domestic league appearances and goals as of 18 May 2014

Aleš Jeseničnik (born 28 June 1984) is a Slovenian retired football defender who last played for Mons Claudius.
