= Rubel Sarsour =

Israeli footballer

Rubel Sarsour روبل صرصور
Personal information
- Full name: Rubel Sarsour
- Date of birth: August 7, 1983 (age 43)
- Place of birth: Kafr Qasim, Israel
- Height: 5 ft 8 in (1.73 m)
- Position: Attacking midfielder

Youth career
- Kafr Qasim
- 1996–2002: Maccabi Petah Tikva

Senior career*
| Years | Team | Apps | (Gls) |
| 2002–2011 | Maccabi Petah Tikva | 100 | (16) |
| 2011 | Hapoel Bnei Lod | 10 | (1) |
| 2011 | Hapoel Kfar Saba | 3 | (0) |
| 2011–2012 | Hapoel Acre | 6 | (0) |
| 2013–2017 | MS Kafr Qasim | 99 | (36) |

International career
| 1999–2000 | Israel U16 | 21 | (2) |
| 2001 | Israel U19 | 5 | (0) |
| 2004–2005 | Israel U21 | 10 | (2) |
- * Club domestic league appearances and goals

Rubel Sarsour (Arabic: روبل صرصور, Hebrew: רובל סרסור; born August 7, 1983) is an Israeli former footballer.

Sarsour is mostly known for his time in Maccabi Petah Tikva, there he was part of the senior team for 9 years, played a total of 158 games and scored 35 goals.

His older brother, Nor, is also a footballer who played for Hapoel Bnei Lod and both brothers played together in F.C. Kafr Qasim.

== Honours ==
=== Maccabi Petah Tikva ===
- Israeli Premier League
  - Runner-up: 2004–05
- Toto Cup
  - Winner: 2003–04
