= Tuomas Kuparinen =

Finnish footballer (born 1979)

Personal information
- Date of birth: 7 August 1979 (age 47)
- Place of birth: Lahti, Finland
- Height: 1.68 m (5 ft 6 in)
- Position: Midfielder

Senior career*
Years	Team	Apps	(Gls)
1999–2000	Lahti	41	(1)
2001–2008	MYPA	163	(19)
2009	KuPS	20	(1)
2010–2011	KTP	23	(4)
2011	Kuusysi	23	(9)
- * Club domestic league appearances and goals

Tuomas Kuparinen (born 7 August 1979) is a Finnish former professional footballer who played as a midfielder.

== Career ==
Kuparinen progressed through the Kuusysi youth academy. He would go on to play in Veikkausliiga for 11 seasons, representing Lahti from 1999 to 2000, MYPA in 2001–08 and KuPS in 2009. Kuparinen appeared in a total of 224 first division in his career and scored 21 goals in them. In the 2010 season, he represented KTP, who played in Ykkönen.

== Honours ==
MYPA

- Veikkausliiga: 2005
- Finnish Cup: 2004
