= Jani Šturm =

Slovenian footballer

Personal information
- Date of birth: 20 March 1982 (age 44)
- Place of birth: Brda, SFR Yugoslavia
- Height: 1.84 m (6 ft 0 in)
- Position: Forward

Youth career
- 1997–1999: Brda
- 1999–2001: Gorica

Senior career*
Years	Team	Apps	(Gls)
2001–2007	Gorica	88	(14)
2001–2002	→ Renče – Goriška Brda (loan)	29	(6)
2002–2003	→ Goriška Brda (loan)	20	(5)
2007–2008	Dundee	17	(1)
2008–2010	Domžale	37	(5)
2011	Drava Ptuj	8	(0)
2011–2013	Brda		
2013	Gorica	13	(1)
2013	Koper	4	(0)
2013–2014	Manzanese		
2014–2017	Valnatisone		

Managerial career
- 2021: Brda
- 2021–2023: Udinese U19
- 2024: Bilje
- 2024: Tolmin
- * Club domestic league appearances and goals

Jani Šturm (born 20 March 1982) is a Slovenian former professional footballer who played as a forward.

== Career ==
Šturm began his career with his hometown Brda. In 1999, he was scouted by Gorica, where he started his professional career in the Slovenian PrvaLiga in 2001. In summer 2005, Šturm was due to sign for Leicester City, but the move fell through after he failed a medical on his long-standing groin injury.

In July 2007, Šturm began a two-week trial with Dundee United before beginning a trial spell with Greenock Morton.

On 1 August 2007, he signed for Dundee in a one-year deal with the option of a second year, rejecting apparent interest from Morton, St Johnstone, Gretna and Dunfermline Athletic. Šturm scored his only league goal for the club in a 2–1 victory against his former team Morton. He was released from the club on 31 May 2008, after scoring only two goals in his time at the Dens Park.

In August 2008, Šturm returned home to Slovenia, where he signed a two-year contract to play for Domžale.

Šturm scored his first league goal for Domžale with the game's opener against the previous season's fourth placed side, Celje, in a 3–2 away victory. He was released by Domžale in August 2010, and signed for Drava Ptuj in January 2011, where he stayed for eight months before resigning for his first club in the Third Division, Brda.
