= Gary Powell (footballer) =

English footballer

Personal information
- Date of birth: 2 April 1969 (age 57)
- Place of birth: Hoylake, England
- Position: Forward

Senior career*
Years	Team	Apps	(Gls)
1987–1991	Everton	0	(0)
1990–1991	→ Lincoln City (loan)	11	(0)
1990–1991	→ Scunthorpe United (loan)	4	(1)
1990–1991	→Wigan Athletic (loan)	14	(4)
1991–1993	Wigan Athletic	70	(13)
1993–1994	Bury	5	(0)
1993–1994	Altrincham	11	(1)
1993–1994	Macclesfield Town	7	(2)
1994–1995	Bangor City	2	(0)
1994–1996	Rhyl	40	(9)
1995–1996	Flint Town United	15	(6)
1996–1997	Conwy United	32	(10)
1996–1997	Rhyl	10	(4)
1997–2002	Total Network Solutions	147	(26)
2002–2008	Rhyl	102	(15)
- * Club domestic league appearances and goals

Gary Powell (born 2 April 1969) is a retired English footballer.

In November 1990, he joined Scunthorpe United on a month's loan, scoring in his second game against York City but failing to appear in a winning side during his stay.

He joined Altrincham in December 1993, debuting in the 1–0 Football Conference victory at Witton Albion on 18 December 1993. He scored one league goal for the club, in the 2–0 home victory over Dover Athletic on 26 February 1994, before moving on to Macclesfield Town at the end of March. He scored twice in the Football Conference for the Macclesfield, scoring the winner in the 1–0 home win over Welling United on 2 May and the equaliser in the final match of the season five days later, a 1–1 draw at Northwich Victoria.

In July 2002 he left The New Saints F.C. to join Rhyl for a third time. He scored Rhyl's first goal in European football in the 3–1 home UEFA Champions League qualifying defeat to Skonto Riga on 21 July 2004. A year later, his 60th-minute goal in a 3–2 away defeat enabled Rhyl to become only the second Welsh Premiership side to win a European tie after beating FK Atlantas on away goals in the UEFA Cup first qualifying round. In June 2010, he was appointed first-team coach at Chester. He left Chester on 21 January 2014. He was later appointed a coach to the under 15s and 16s at Bristol City, leaving in 2022. He then took a role as first-team coach at Stockport County, but has now retired.
